= Etelka Kenéz Heka =

Hungarian writer, poet and singer (1936–2024)

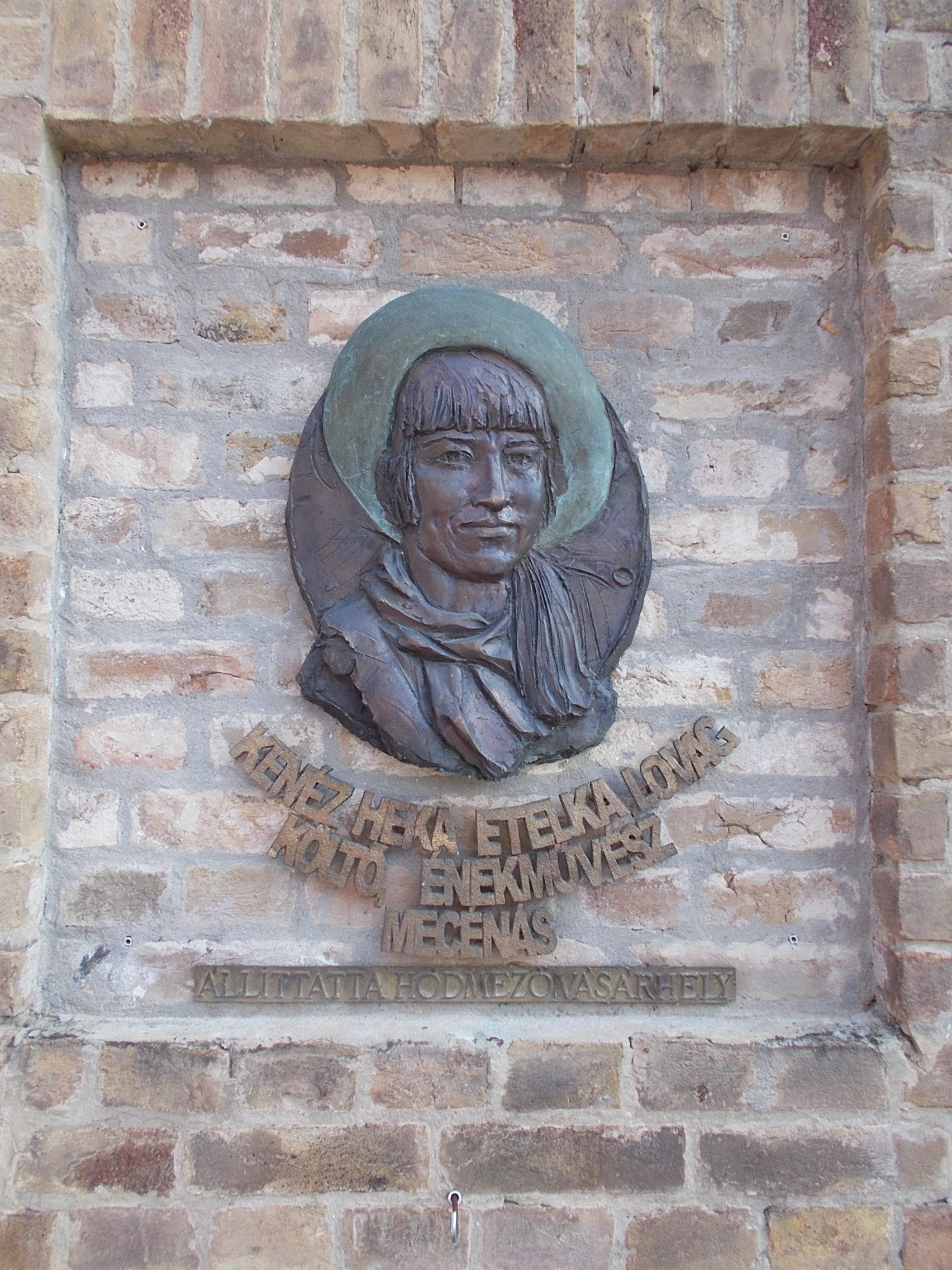
- Born: 26 October 1936; Gajić, Yugoslavia
- Died: 5 May 2024 (aged 87)
- Other name: Etelka Heka
- Occupations: Writer, poet, singer
- Years active: 1966–2024
- Partner(s): Ernő Kenéz, opera singer
- Parent(s): János Heka; Etelka Stok
- Website: katalogus.nlvk.hu/html/kenezetelka/elete.htm

Etelka Kenéz Heka (Hungarian pronunciation: [ˈɛtɛlkɒ ˈkɛneːz ˈhɛkɒ]) (26 October 1936 – 5 May 2024), sometimes Etelka Heka (Hungarian pronunciation: [ˈɛtɛlkɒ ˈhɛkɒ]) was a Hungarian writer, poet and singer.

== Life and career ==
Kenéz Heka was born on 26 October 1936 in Gajić (Hungarian: Hercegmárok or Márok), Yugoslavia but she was raised at Zmajevac (Hungarian: Vörösmart). She graduated from the secondary grammar School at Bački Monoštor (Hungarian: Monostorszeg). She took a degree at the Teachers' Training Faculty in Hungarian in Subotica, University of Novi Sad. After her graduation she started to learn to sing from opera singer Margit Markovics privately.

Kenéz Heka played at Novi Sad Theatre and sang at Radio Television of Vojvodina. She also sang in Vienna in 1966, then in West Germany and Denmark. Although she was a Hungarian, she visited Hungary for the first time in 1974, and she met her husband, opera singer Ernő Kenéz in Budapest. They moved to Vienna where they married and they had a restaurant. In 1997 they came to Hungary when her husband became deathly ill and her spouse died at his birth town, Hódmezővásárhely in 1998.

Kenéz Heka held three citizenships: Hungarian, Austrian and Croatian. She had houses in Vienna and Szeged but lived primarily in Hódmezővásárhely. She wrote about 90 books.

Kenéz Heka died on 5 May 2024, at the age of 87.

== Selected books ==
- Séta a múltban, Bába Kiadó, Szeged, 2003.
- A lélek rejtelmei, Hódmezővásárhely, 2004.
- Régi idők dalai versben, Hódmezővásárhely, 2005.
- A kozmosz titkai, hermetikus filozófia és vegyes költemények, Hódmezővásárhely, 2005.
- Kenéz Heka Etelka novellái, Hódmezővásárhely, 2006.
- Laura különös históriája, Hódmezővásárhely, 2007.
- Trubadúr spirituálék, Hódmezővásárhely, 2007.
- Őszi szerelem: lírikus költemények, Hódmezővásárhely, 2007.
- Istar, a szerelem úrnője: válogatott költemények 50 kötetből, Antológia Kiadó, Lakitelek, 2008.
- Kína varázsa: kínai versek, Hódmezővásárhely, 2008.
- Vásárhelyi regős tanyák, Hódmezővásárhely, 2009.
- Varázslatos Adria, Hódmezővásárhely, 2009.
- A teremtés költészete szanszkrit stílusban, Hódmezővásárhely, 2009.
- Istennel levelezem: szakrális ódák, költemények, Hódmezővásárhely, 2010.
- A szellem bűvöletében, Hódmezővásárhely, 2015.
- 1050 karácsonyi haiku ének, Hódmezővásárhely, 2015.

== Awards ==
- Hódmezővásárhely Signum Urbis Honorantis Award – 2003
- Hódmezővásárhely Pro Urbe Award – 2015
