= List of theatres in Serbia =

This is a list of professional and semi-professional theaters on the territory of the Republic of Serbia.

== List ==
Photo	Name	City, address	Note
	Atelje 212	Belgrade, Svetogorska 21	
	Belgrade Drama Theatre	Belgrade, Mileševska 64a	
	Bitef	Belgrade, Square Mira Trailović 1	
	Đumrukana	Belgrade, City Park 2	The first regular Belgrade theater house; destroyed in bombing during WWII
	Knjaževsko Serpski Teatar	Kragujevac, Daničićeva 3	Oldest active theater in Serbia
	National Theatre	Belgrade, Republic Square	This includes the artistic work units Opera, Ballet and Drama, played out on the stage and the scene Raša Plaović. Today it is one of the most representative and most important cultural institutions in Serbia.
	National Theatre	Jagodina, Princess Milica Street 26	
	National Theatre	Niš, Sinđelić Square	
	National Theatre	Subotica	
	National Theatre "Toša Jovanović"	Zrenjanin, Freedom Square 7	
	Novi Sad Theatre	Novi Sad, Jovana Subotića St. 3-5	
	Serbian National Theatre	Novi Sad, Theater Square 1	
	Terazije Theatre	Belgrade, Terazije 29	
	Theatre and Opera Madlenianum	Belgrade, 32 Main Street, Zemun	The first private opera and theater company both in Serbia and in southeastern Europe
	Theatre Bora Stanković	Vranje, National Hero Square 1	Burned down in arson in 2012; currently under reconstruction
	Theatre Dobrica Milutinović	Sremska Mitrovica, City Park 2	
	Youth Theatre	Novi Sad, Ignjata Pavlasa 4	
	Yugoslav Drama Theatre	Belgrade, King Street Milan 50	
	Zvezdara Theatre	Belgrade, Milan Rakic 38	Private theater
	Drama Art Scene and Correspondence Theatre	Novi Sad	The Drama Art Scene was founded in 1974 as a cultural and artistic society, within which the amateur scene, the professional scene and the universal animation system Correspondence Theatre operated. The professional stage of the Drama Art Scene was created as the third professional theater in the Serbian language in Novi Sad and was active during the 1990s. In the following period, only the amateur scene remains active.

== See also ==
- Serbian culture
