= Church of St. Peter and Paul, Topolje =

Church of St. Peter and Paul
- Crkva svetog Petra i Pavla
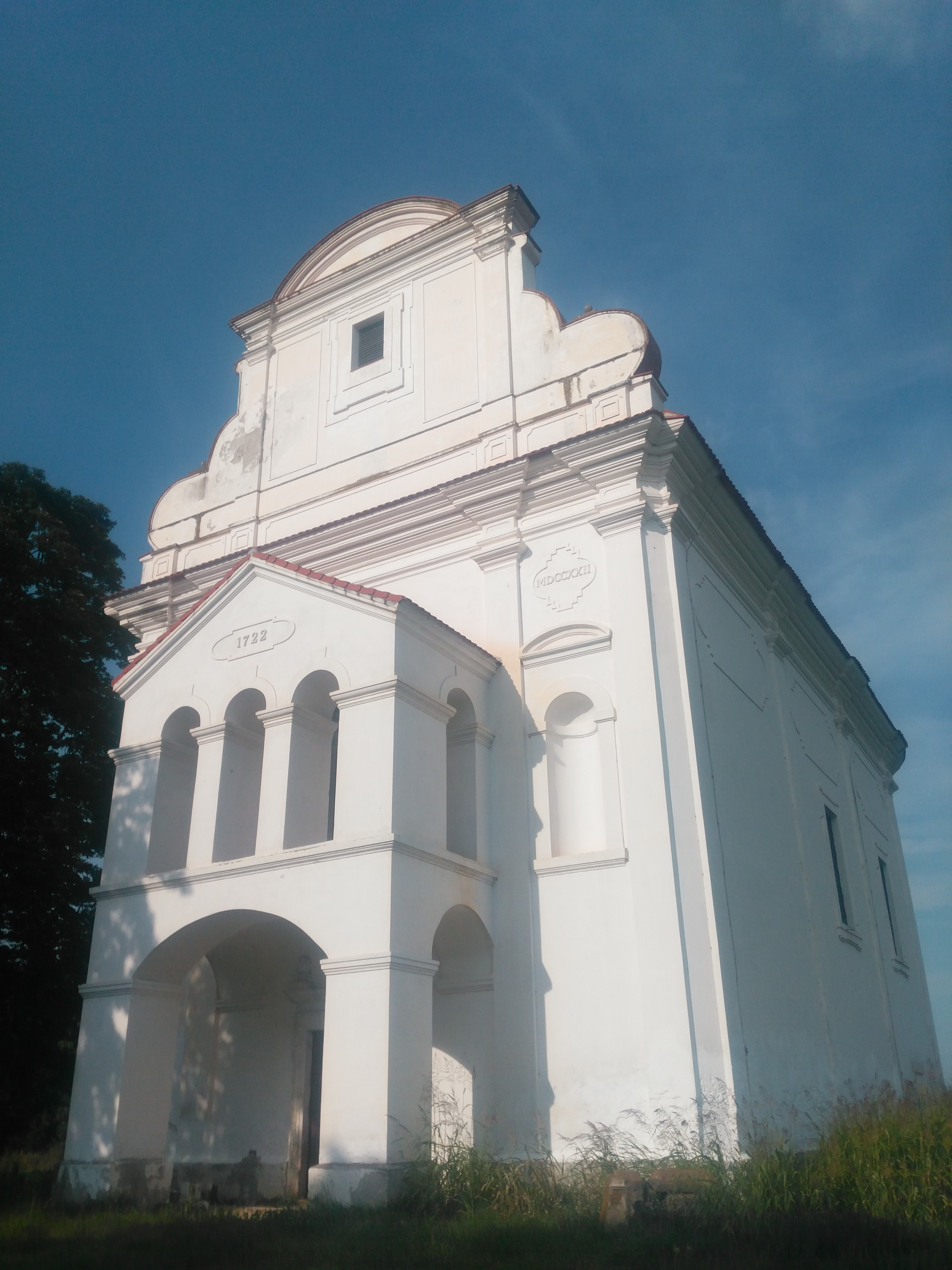
- Location: Topolje
- Country: Croatia
- Denomination: Roman Catholic

History
- Dedication: Saint Peter and Saint Paul

The Church of St. Peter and Paul (Croatian: Crkva svetog Petra i Pavla, Hungarian: Szent Péter és Pál-templom, Latin: Ecclesia Sancti Petri et Pauli) in Topolje is a Roman Catholic church in Baranya and Podunavlje region in eastern Croatia. The church was built in 1722 at the site where Prince Eugene of Savoy defeated Kara Mustafa Pasha on 12 August 1687. (Note that the year may be inaccurate, as Kara Mustafa was executed shortly after the Battle of Vienna in 1683.) It is the oldest preserved church in Baranja. Today, the church is a cultural monument of the 1st category and is one of the most important baroque sacral buildings in Croatia. The village of Topolje is the seat of the parish of St. Peter and Paul founded in 1247 and reestablished in 1775, which today is a part of the Roman Catholic Archdiocese of Đakovo-Osijek. The church is known in the region after the mystic story about three failed attempts to build a church tower. By this story the church is allegedly located on the site of a Turkish cemetery that is the reason why the tower with the cross on the church tower did not survive at any of the three attempts. Other versions of the story mention witches turning around during Mass, and for a while there were rumors that the radios in the vehicles were making noise when passing at the road next to the church.

== See also ==
- Catholic Church in Croatia
- Draž
