= Podolje =

- Village (Selo)
- Location within Osijek-Baranja County Location within Croatia Location within Europe
- Country: Croatia
- County: Osijek-Baranja
- Municipality: Draž

Area
  - Total: 9.1 km^{2} (3.5 sq mi)

Population (2021)
  - Total: 88
  - Density: 9.7/km^{2} (25/sq mi)

Podolje (Hungarian: Nagybodolya, Serbian Cyrillic: Подоље) is a settlement in the region of Baranja, Croatia. Administratively, it is located in the Draž municipality within the Osijek-Baranja County. Population is 140 people as of 2011.

== See also ==
- Osijek-Baranja County
- Baranja
