= Mladen Dražetin =

Serbian poet and writer (1951–2015)

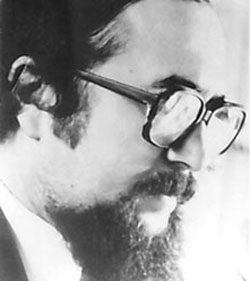
- Born: 3 March 1951; Novi Sad, FPR Yugoslavia
- Died: 23 July 2015 (aged 64); Novi Sad, Serbia
- Occupations: Professor of social sciences, economist, theatrical creator, poet, writer and philosopher

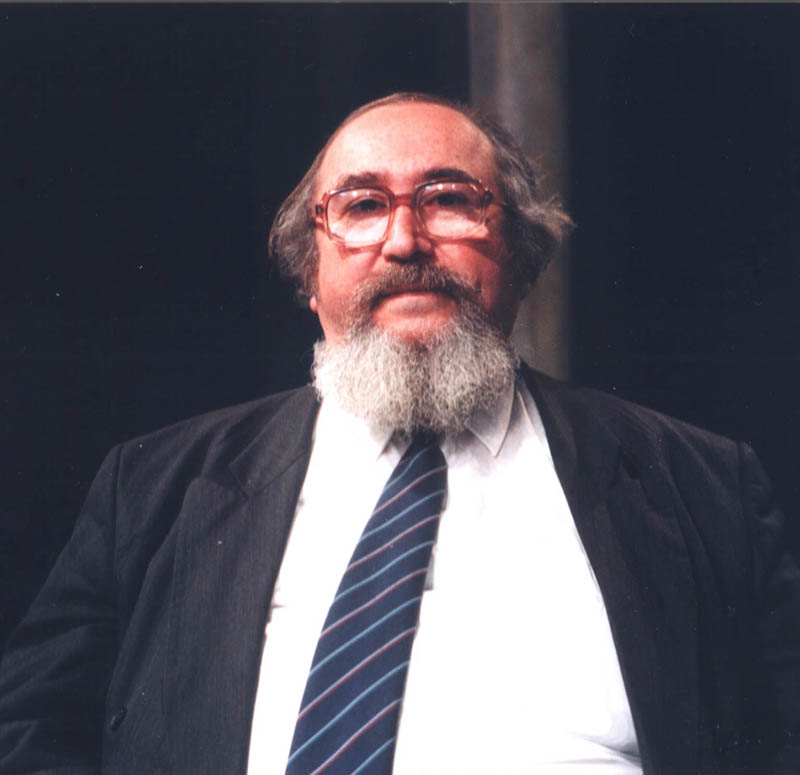
Mladen Dražetin

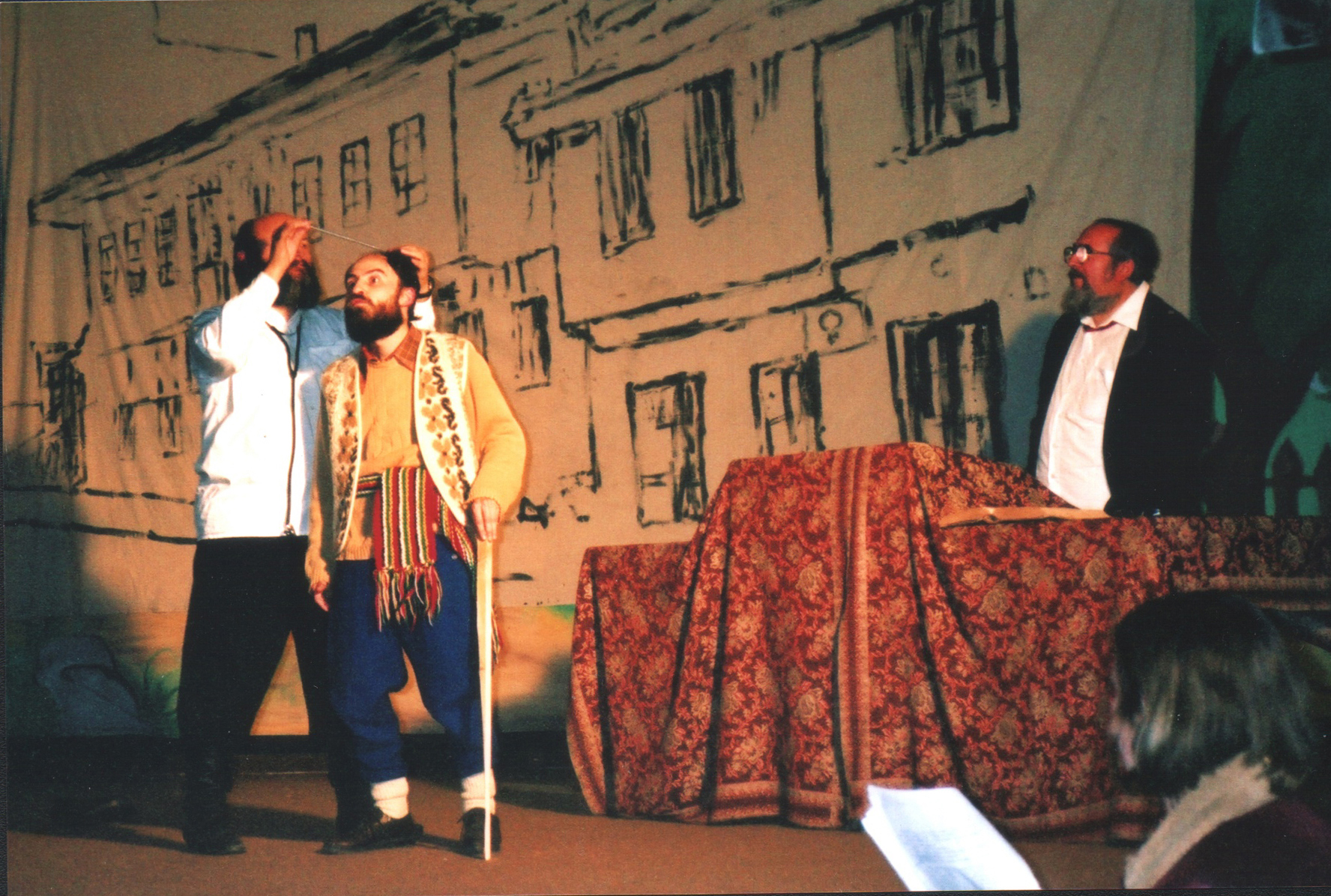
Mladen Dražetin starring in a theater play "Badger in Court", Erdevik, 2003.

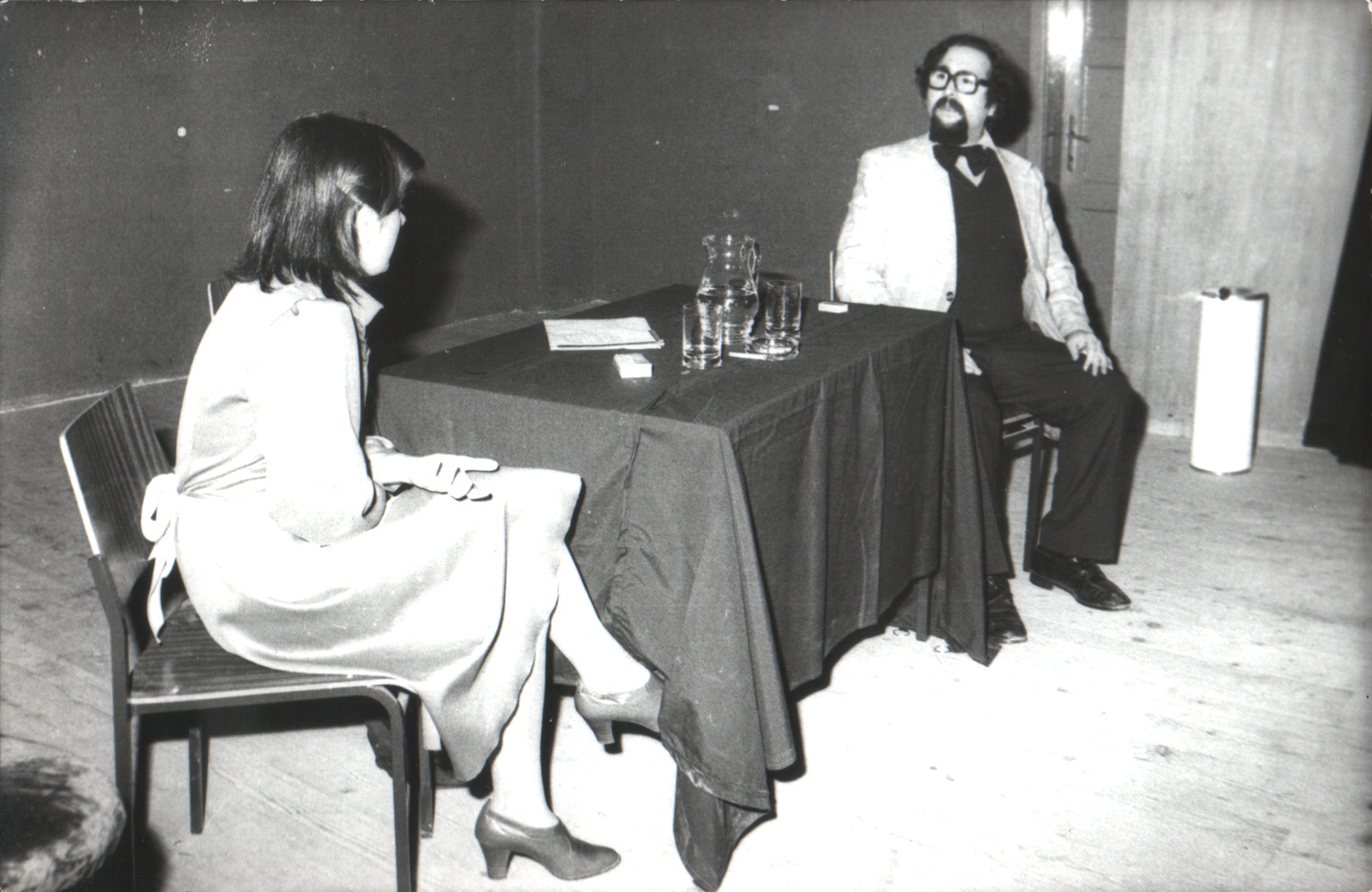
Mladen Dražetin starring in a theater play "Proposal", Novi Sad, 1986.

Mladen Dražetin (Serbian Cyrillic: Младен Дражетин, 3 March 1951 – 23 July 2015) was a Serbian economist, theatrical creator, poet, writer and philosopher. His father Rada was a courier in the Local Community Office in Mošorin, while his mother Vukica (born surname Janjatović) was from Sombor. He left behind works of poetry, prose, drama and philosophy. He was the creator of the Correspondence Theatre ("Dopisno pozorište"), a specific type of theater organization and play, which he conceived and organized in 1974.

== Education ==
He finished Commercial School in 1968 in Novi Sad, Advanced Commercial School in 1972 in Varaždin, and graduated from the Subotica Economic College in 1983.

Dražetin defended his Master thesis "A specificity of origin and activity of The Correspondence Theatre in Novi Sad, with a projection of further perfecting" ("Specifičnost nastanka i delovanja Dopisnog pozorišta u Novom Sadu, sa projekcijom daljeg usavršavanja") in 1989 at the College of Drama Arts in Belgrade and PhD in 2004 at the Faculty for Service Business in Novi Sad with thesis Amateurism as a way of man's self-realization through local radio and television stations in Vojvodina ("Amaterizam kao način čovekove samorealizacije putem lokalnih radio i televizijskih stanica u Vojvodini").

== Career ==
Dražetin performed various tasks in several working organizations and state administration. He was also employed at Television of Novi Sad and Radio Television of Serbia and also worked as a professor.

He worked in "Autovojvodina" (1968–1977), in SOUR "Agrovojvodina", where he edited the newspaper with same name (1977–1980), then moved to the City Assembly where he worked as the market inspector (1980–1985) and senior market inspector (1985–1990), then in the Television of Novi Sad was the Director of the Service of joint programming activities (1990–1993) and Head of TV Cinemateka and editor of Redaction for historiography of the cultural heritage of Vojvodina (1993–1994), and was also editor in "7 TV days" ("7 TV dana"). Then he worked as a federal market inspector (1994–2003) and the republic market inspector (2003–2009). He also worked as a professor for about ten years in Higher Technical School of Professional Studies in Novi Sad for teaching areas: multimedia I, multimedia II, WEB communications and mass communications. He was also a guest lecturer at the BK University in Belgrade and Faculty of Education in Sombor. He also served as a lay judge in the High Court in Novi Sad and as a court expert for the evaluation of the capital, damage assessment and calculation of earnings.

== Cultural, educational and scientific-research work ==
Dražetin was the creator of the Correspondence Theatre ("Dopisno pozorište"), a specific type of theatre organization and play, which he conceived and organized in 1974. He was among the founders of the Drama Art Scene ("Pozornica dramske umetnosti"), whose chief executive he was from 1994.

He showed the theatrical performances in the villages, city parks and squares, in companies, as well as in the apartments. TV show of Petar Ljubojev about this project received in 1986 the Grand Prix at the festival in Monte Carlo. Dražetin has directed over 100 theatrical plays and recitals in amateur and professional scenes, within the Correspondence Theatre. He appeared as an actor in theatrical plays and in about ten films.

By his own script, he directed two films of silent burlesque: "Disordered thoughts" ("Rastrojene misli") (1971) and "Humorists from Novi Sad" ("Komičari iz Novog Sada") (1973). He also worked on poetry and has published seven collections of poems.

His social drama "Confession" ("Ispovest") (1972) and experimental comedy "Philosophy" ("Filozofija") (1976) were performed on professional and amateur scenes. He edited the newspaper of amateur theater "Stage" ("Pozornica") (from 1974) and the editions "Tribune of Poetry" ("Tribina poezije") (since 1981) and "Mass culture and art" ("Masovna kultura i umetnost") (since 1996), all within the publishing activity of The Drama Art Scene and The Correspondence Theatre. He was also a member of the editorial board of the magazine for culture and art titled "Krovovi" (published in Sremski Karlovci).

Besides that, he was a literary critic, theorist of theater and television. On television, he was author (director or screenwriter) of more acclaimed shows such as "Health theater" ("Zdravstveni teatar"), "75 years of Esperanto" ("75 godina Esperanta") and other.

Social drama "Confession" which Dražetin wrote was played in over 50,000 micro-theaters of the Correspondence Theatre around the world, as an educational program.

He wrote a book on ethics, aesthetics and sociology of culture called "Eternal art of the play" ("Večna umetnost igre"), which is a result of his 30 years of scientific research and the choice of teaching material from lectures at universities, colleges and high schools, where his lectures from 1996 to 2013 were attended by more than ten thousand students.

Dražetin gave many notable lectures "On the establishment and operation of Correspondence Theatre from Novi Sad, as a universal correspondence system" ("O nastanku i delovanju Dopisnog pozorišta iz Novog Sada, kao univerzalnog korespondentnog sistema") in several countries - Russia, Austria, Slovakia, Hungary, Romania, Greece, Croatia, Slovenia, Republika Srpska, Macedonia and Montenegro.

He played episodic roles in two local feature films: "The Jews are coming" ("Jevreji dolaze"), directed by Prvoslav Marić and "The Hourglass" ("Peščanik") which is based on a novel of Danilo Kiš.

He was a member of the Association of Writers of Vojvodina and of the Association of Journalists of Serbia.

In 2016, at the literary manifestation "In honor of Sima Cucić" ("U čast Sime Cucića") organized by the Banatian cultural center (Banatski kulturni centar) from Novo Miloševo, Dražetin was posthumously awarded with a plaque "Sima Cucić" for the overall contribution to the affirmation of literature for children.

He was included into the Encyclopedia of Novi Sad (Enciklopedija Novog Sada, Book 7, Novi Sad, 1996), The Lexicon of the Artists of Vojvodina (Leksikon umetnika Vojvodine, Roman Vehovec, Novi Sad, 2001), The Directory of Writers for Children (Azbučnik pisaca za decu, Svetozar Malešev, Novi Sad, 1997), Anthology of the most beautiful songs about love "Great Secret" (Antologija najlepših pesama o ljubavi "Velika tajna", Pero Zubac, Belgrade, 1997), The Anthology of the New Serbian Poetry for Children and Youth "When the Heart Starts Glittering" (Antologija novijeg srpskog pesništva za decu i mlade "Kad srce zasvetluca", Pero Zubac, Ruma, 2009), Biographical Dictionary of Šajkaška (Biografski rečnik Šajkaške, Boško Brzić, Novi Sad, 2013), "The Dictionary of Vojvodina" ("Rečnik Vojvodine") of Miroslav Antić (Sarajevo, 1989).

His texts were published in the following publications (magazines, newspapers, journals): "Autovojvodina" (Novi Sad), "Građanski list" (Novi Sad), "Dnevnik" (Novi Sad), "Enciklopedija Novog Sada" (Novi Sad), "Zlatna greda" (Novi Sad), "Krovovi" (Sremski Karlovci), "Lipar" (Kragujevac), "Luča" (Subotica), "Majdan" (Kostolac), "Naftaš" (Novi Sad), "Naše stvaranje" (Leskovac), "Pozornica" (Novi Sad), "Romologija" (Novi Sad), "Sveske za istoriju Novog Sada" (Novi Sad), "Svitak" (Požega), "Stig" (Malo Crniće), "Studia Ruthenica" (Novi Sad), "Susreti" (Novi Sad), "Ulaznica" (Zrenjanin), "Uspenja" (Leskovac), "Švetlosc" (Novi Sad). Dražetin's works and texts have been translated into English, Esperanto and Rusyn language.

== Death ==
He died in Novi Sad in 2015, and was buried in the cemetery in Ledinci.

== Works ==
Books which Dražetin published during his life:

- "Poems" ("Pesme"), collection of poems (1971)
- "Quiet Night Brightness" ("Sjaj tihe noći"), collection of poems (1971)
- "Reins Lost" ("Zametene uzde"), collection of poems (1972)
- "Dream Sorrow" ("Tuga sna"), collection of poems (1974)
- "After Vagabondage" ("Posle lutanja"), collection of poems (1981)
- "Secret Hem" ("Tajni porub"), collection of poems (1986)
- "Heart on a Swing" ("Srce na ljuljašci"), collection of poems for children (1990)
- "Eternal art of the play" ("Večna umetnost igre") - the philosophy of the new development (theory and practice) - The first Serbian philosophical system (Novo Miloševo, Banatski kulturni centar, 2014).

Dražetin's books published posthumously:

- "Universal animation system Correspondence Theatre - Correspondent play process (theory and practice)" ("Univerzalni animatorski sistem Dopisno pozorište - korespondentni proces igre (teorija i praksa)") (Šajkaš - Novi Sad, 2017).
- "Tican's Revolt in 1807: the national drama in three acts" ("Ticanova buna 1807: nacionalna drama u tri čina") (Šajkaš - Novi Sad, 2017).
- "Pačka Schwap" ("Pački Švapa") (novel) (Novo Miloševo, Banatski kulturni centar, 2018).
- "Eternal art of the play" ("Večna umetnost igre") - the philosophy of the new development (theory and practice) - The first Serbian philosophical system, second edition (Novo Miloševo, Banatski kulturni centar, 2019).

Last Dražetin's work which he completed shortly before his death is a theater piece "Tican's Revolt in 1807: the national drama in three acts" ("Ticanova buna 1807: nacionalna drama u tri čina"), which he dramatized and wrote directing and adjusting his work in accordance to scientific publications of the Historical Institute SANU, as well as in accordance to processed appropriate stories and legends about Tican, which passed from generation to generation.

Publishing and printing of several more Dražetin's unpublished works is in preparation.

Unpublished Dražetin's works:

- "Winged Song" ("Krilata pesma") (poetry for children).
- "Confession" ("Ispovest") (social drama) and "Philosophy from A to Z" ("Filozofija od A do Š") (Experimental Comedy).
- "Traces of Eternity - An endeavor to cultural infinity - texts, essays, reviews, literary, biographical and other impressions" ("Tragovi večnosti - Težnja ka kulturnoj beskonačnosti - tekstovi, eseji, recenzije, književni, biografski i drugi prikazi") (collection of works).
- "A thousand poems" ("Hiljadu pesama") (poems).
- "Amateurism as a way of man's self-realization through local radio and television stations in Vojvodina" ("Amaterizam kao način čovekove samorealizacije putem lokalnih radio i televizijskih stanica u Vojvodini") (PhD thesis).
- "Correspondence Theatre" ("Dopisno pozorište") (script) and "Directing in the rain" ("Režija na kiši") (theatre play).

LULLABY
The wind is blowing and swinging the cradle, to put asleep mom's jewel.
Sleep sleep my prettily doll, I'm gonna bring you the squab from the nest.
Sleep son, sleep my honey, I'll bring you nightingale which sings.
When the sparrows fall asleep on a mulberry, I'll buy you a heart on a swing.
"Sleep Raša. Dawn, do not come yet"! A little birds on a branch will start singing.

— A poem from Dražetin's collection of children's poetry "Heart on a Swing" ("Srce na ljuljašci") (1990).

USPAVANKA
Vetar duva i kolevku ljulja, da uspava maminog dragulja.
Buji baji milo moje luče, skinuću ti iz gnezda golupče.
Spavaj sine, spavaj zlato moje, doneću ti slavuja što poje.
Kad na dudu zadremaju vrapci kupiću ti srce na ljuljašci.
„Spavaj Rašo. Zoro, još ne svani"! Zapevaće ptičice na grani.

— A poem from Dražetin's collection of children's poetry "Heart on a Swing" ("Srce na ljuljašci") (1990).
