= Topolje, Osijek-Baranja County =

Topolje
- Village (Selo)
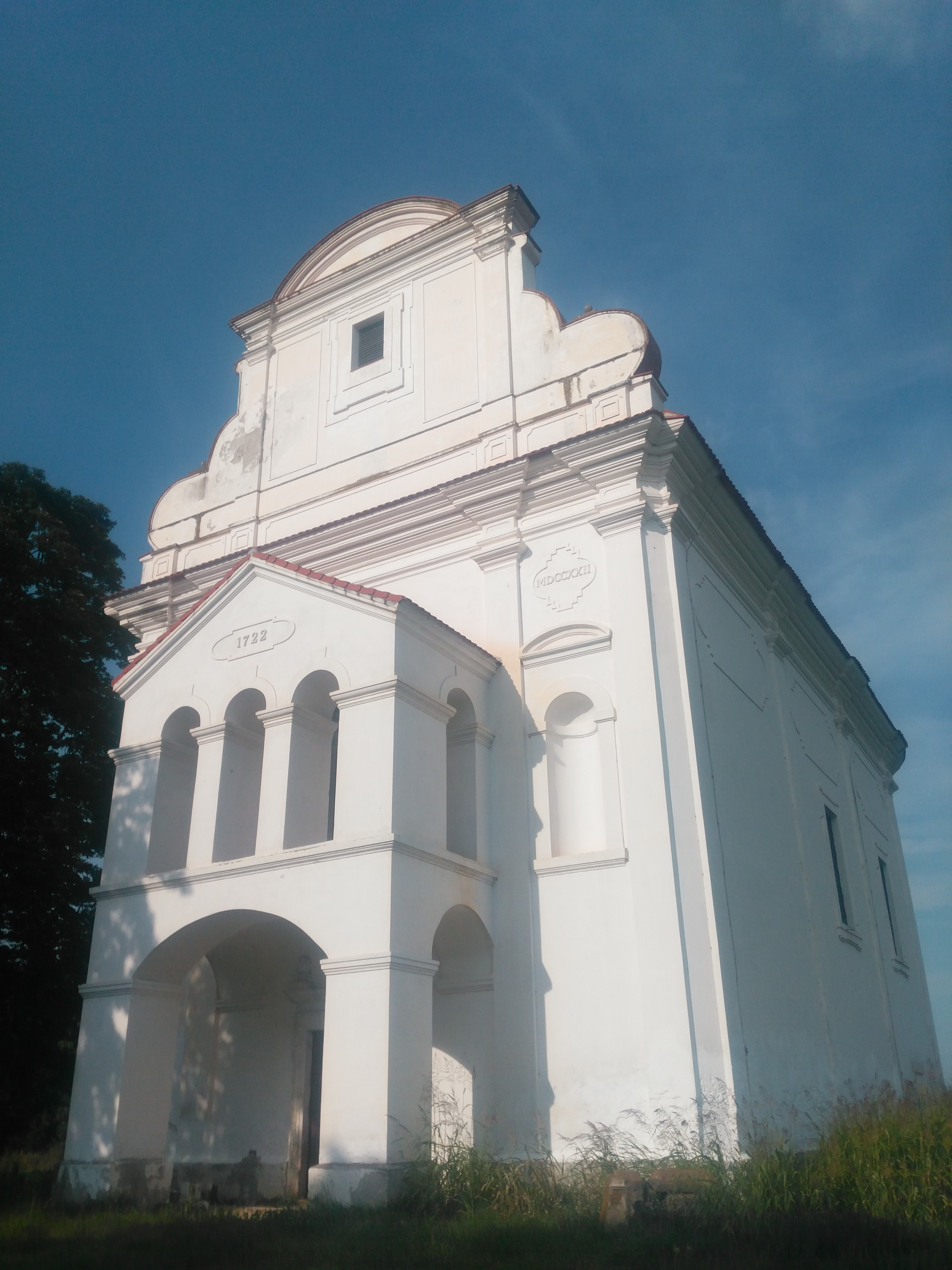
- Church of St. Peter and Paul, Topolje

- Location within Osijek-Baranja County Location within Croatia Location within Europe
- Coordinates: 45.866°N 18.734°E
- Country: Croatia
- Region: Baranya (Podunavlje)
- County: Osijek-Baranja
- Municipality: Draž

Area
  - Total: 25.7 km^{2} (9.9 sq mi)

Population (2021)
  - Total: 287
  - Density: 11.2/km^{2} (28.9/sq mi)

Topolje (Hungarian: Izsép, Serbian Cyrillic: Топоље) is a settlement in the region of Baranja, Croatia. Administratively, it is located in the Draž municipality within the Osijek-Baranja County. Its population is 473 people.
