= Drama Art Scene =

Drama Art Scene Позорница драмске уметности Pozornica dramske umetnosti
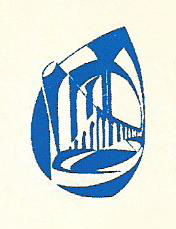
- Coat of arms of the Drama Art Scene
- Interactive map of Drama Art Scene; Позорница драмске уметности Pozornica dramske umetnosti
- Former names: Позорница драмских уметности Pozornica dramskih umetnosti (Drama Arts Scene)
- Address: Oblačića Rada 17, Novi Sad; Serbia
- Operator: Vladimir Stojanov (manager)
- Designation: Drama Art Scene

Construction
- Opened: 3 March 1974
- Years active: 1974 - today

Website
- https://sites.google.com/site/dopisnopozoriste/

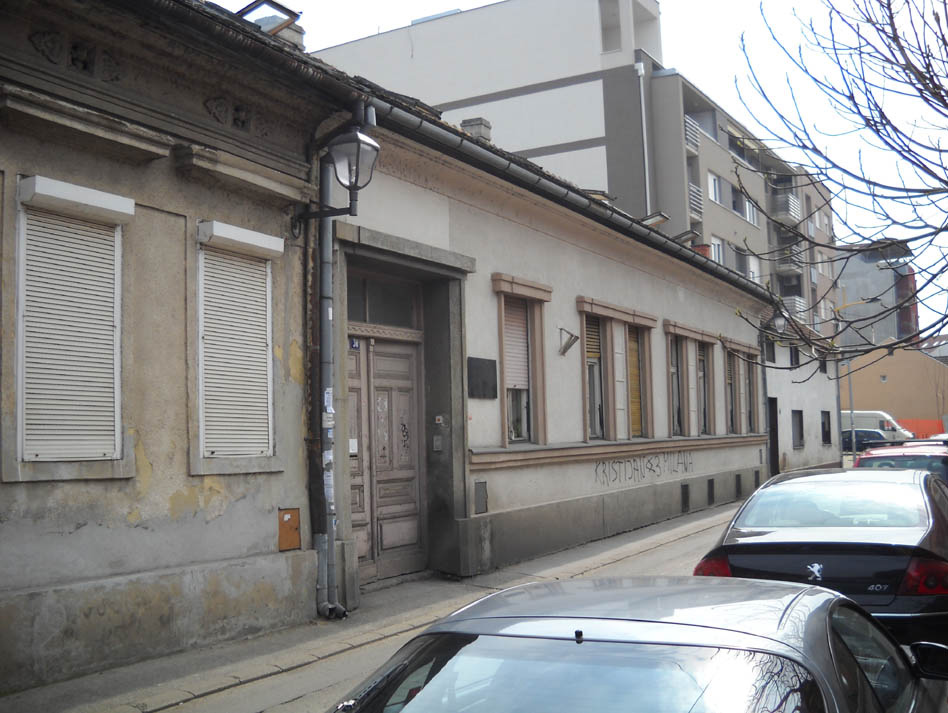
Gajeva 30 Street in Novi Sad - one of the former seats of the Drama Art Scene

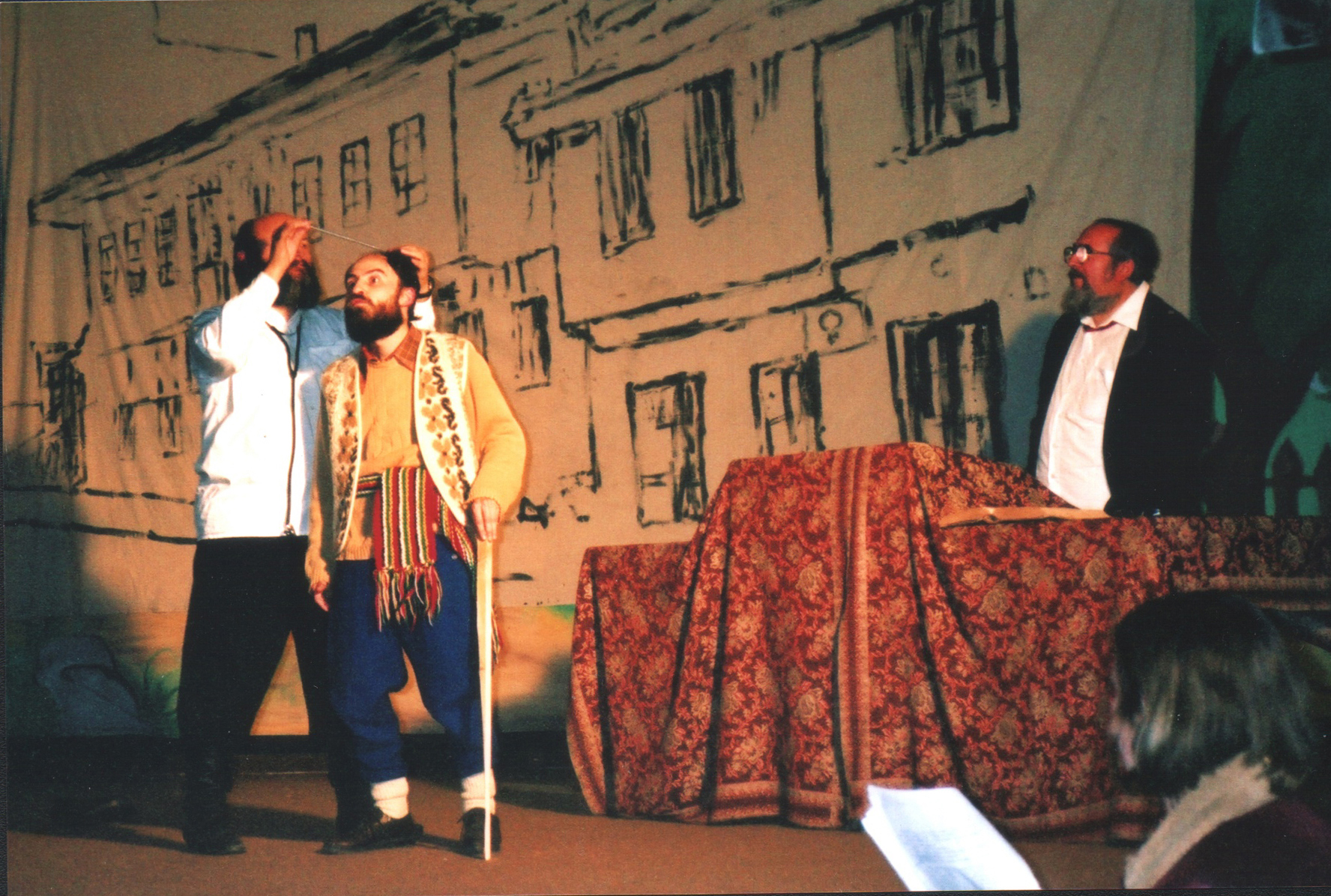
Members of the Society acting in a theater play (Vladimir Stojanov, Srđan Simić, Mladen Dražetin). Theater play "Badger in Court", Erdevik, 2003

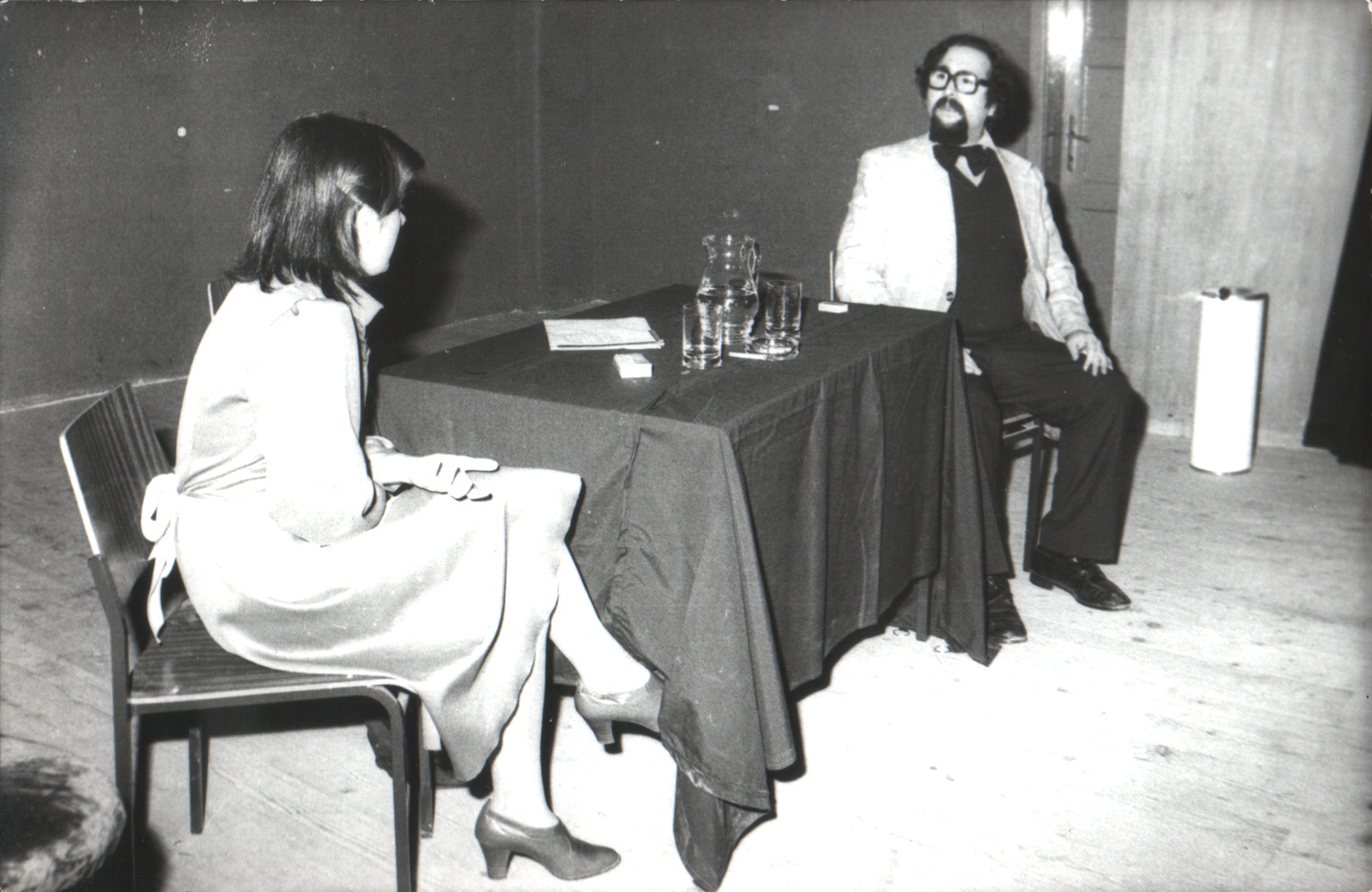
Members of the Society acting in a theater play (Ljubinka Modić, Mladen Dražetin). Theater play "Proposal", Novi Sad, 1986

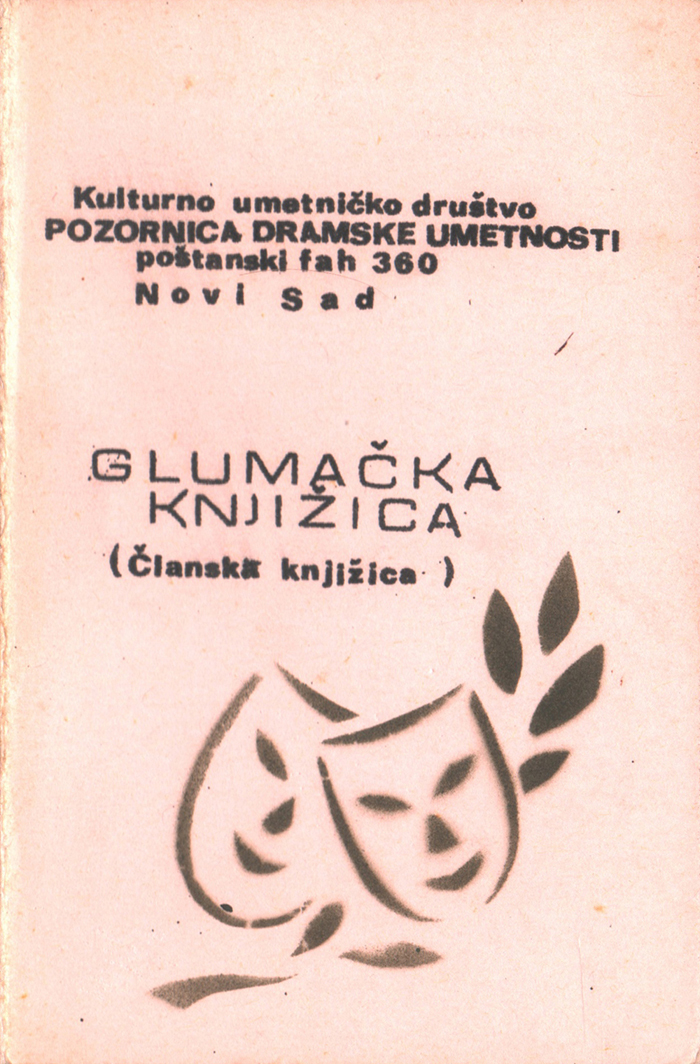
Acting booklet of the Society

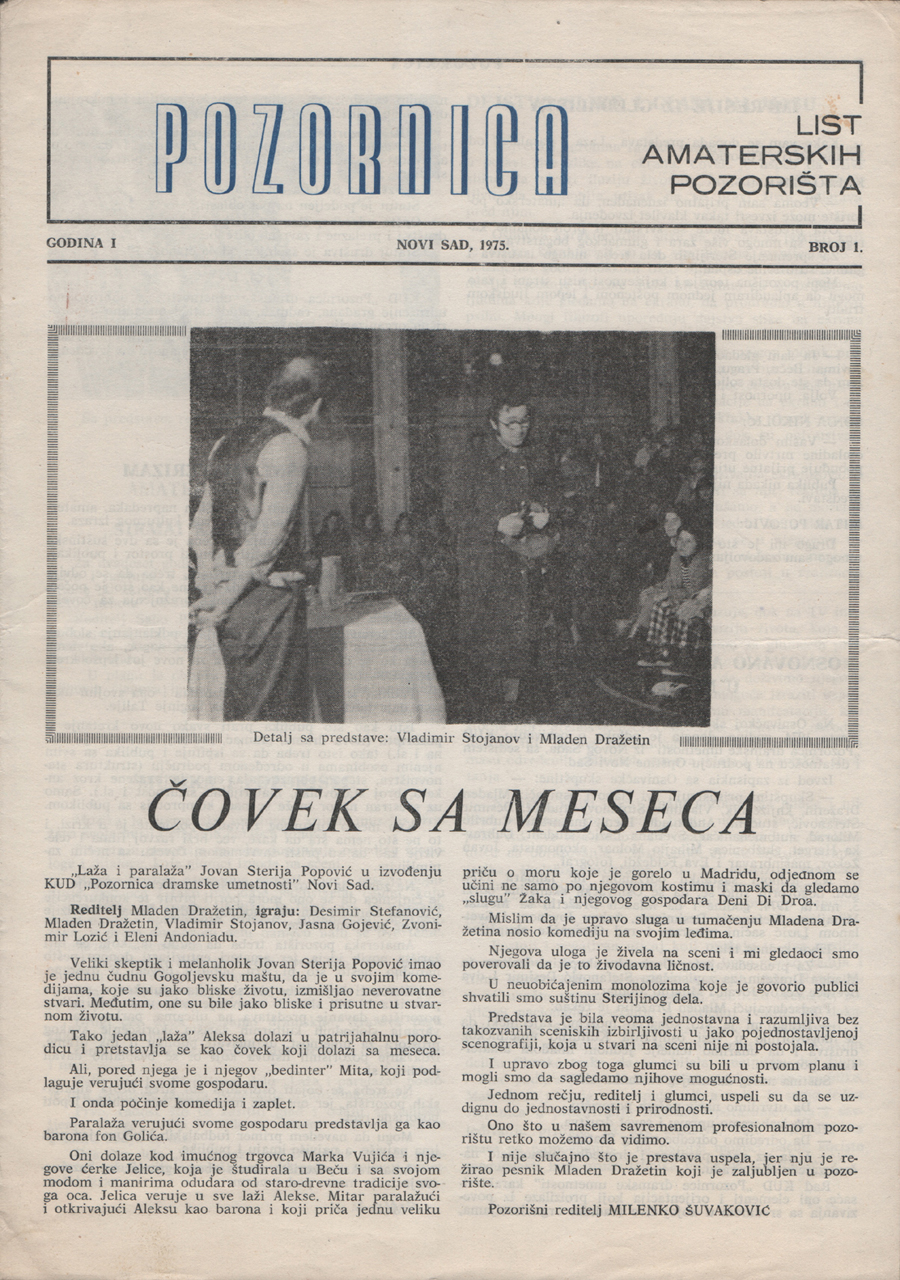
Front page of the first issue of "Pozornica" ("Stage"), the newsletter of the Society (1975)

The Drama Art Scene (Serbian: Позорница драмске уметности / Pozornica dramske umetnosti; also known as the Drama Arts Scene - Serbian: Позорница драмских уметности / Pozornica dramskih umetnosti) is the first cultural-artistic society in Novi Sad that fostered theatrical amateurism and had a permanent professional scene, as well as correspondent and multimedial Correspondence Theatre (Serbian: Дописно позориште / Dopisno pozorište). This specific theater was formed on 3 March 1974 within the local community Rotkvarija in Novi Sad, Serbia (then former Yugoslavia).

== Establishment ==
The founders of the Society in 1974 were:

- Mladen Dražetin, writer,
- Vladimir Stojanov, actor,
- Desimir Stefanović, student,
- Eleni Andoniadu, high school graduate,
- Milorad Čubrilo, auto mechanic,
- Svetlana Lazic, actress,
- Dubravka Herget, clerk,
- Mihajlo Molnar, economist,
- Jovan Žekov, locksmith,
- Eva Feldeždi, photographer.

== Professional scene ==
Within the professional scene of the Drama Art Scene society, the following activities were developed:

- Children's theater "Ante Laura" (Дечји театар "Анте Лаура" / Dečji teatar "Ante Laura")
- Theatre for Adults "Milenko Šuvaković" (Театар за одрасле "Миленко Шуваковић" / Teatar za odrasle "Milenko Šuvaković")
- The humorous theater "Novi Sad" (Хумористички театар "Нови Сад" / Humoristički teatar "Novi Sad")

== The Tournament of Wittiness ==
From the humorous theater of the Drama Art Scene the Tournament of Wittiness (Serbian: Турнир духовитости / Turnir duhovitosti) has been developed. This Tournament was held by the idea of Mladen Dražetin and method of the Correspondence Theatre. It was organized by Ekspres Politika from 1977 to 1998. Under the motto "laughing on your own bill" ("Смех на свој цех", "Smeh na svoj ceh"), this competition between villages and cities took place via articles on pages of Belgrade daily newspaper, as well as via stage performances.

== Performances ==
Within the Theatre, named after a former famous director of the Serbian National Theatre - Šuvaković, the most notable performance was the "Philistines" (Serbian: Малограђани / Malograđani) of Maxim Gorky, directed by Croatian director Dr. Vlatko Perković (in 1990). The famous actors of Serbian National Theatre (Ivan Hajtl, Feodor Tapavički, Novak Bilbija, Jelica Hadžić-Bjeli, etc.) also participated in this play. The best received plays of the Children's Theatre were the Heidi (Хајди / Hajdi) and the Little Prince (Мали принц / Mali princ). So far, the professional and amateur scenes of the Society performed over 150 plays and recitals.

== Publishing activity ==
The Society has launched its newsletter Pozornica (Позорница, English: "Stage"), which was published periodically since 1975. It also launched the editions Tribune of Poetry (Трибина поезије / Tribina poezije) and Mass culture and arts (Масовна култура и уметност / Masovna kultura i umetnost), in which the most important published book was the university textbook Mass communications (Масовне комуникације / Masovne komunikacije) of Dr. Petar Ljubojev (in 1996). In the edition "Tribune of Poetry", the collections of poems of Mladen Dražetin the "Dream Sorrow" ("Туга сна" / "Tuga sna") (1974) and "After Vagabondage" ("После лутања" / "Posle lutanja") (1981) were published.

== Cooperation ==
The Drama Art Scene society established cooperation with Serbian National Theatre and other theaters in Serbia and Republika Srpska, as well as cooperation with many famous directors, actors and other theatrical workers.

== Presidents of Society ==
- Mladen Dražetin (1974-1982),
- Velimir Milovanović (1982-1984),
- Mladen Dražetin (1984-1988),
- Vladimir Stojanov (1988-1994).

After 1994 Stojanov was manager of the professional scene, while Dražetin was General Manager of the Society.
