= Novi Sad Youth Theatre =

Theatre in Novi Sad, Serbia

Youth Theatre
- Позориште младих
- Official logo

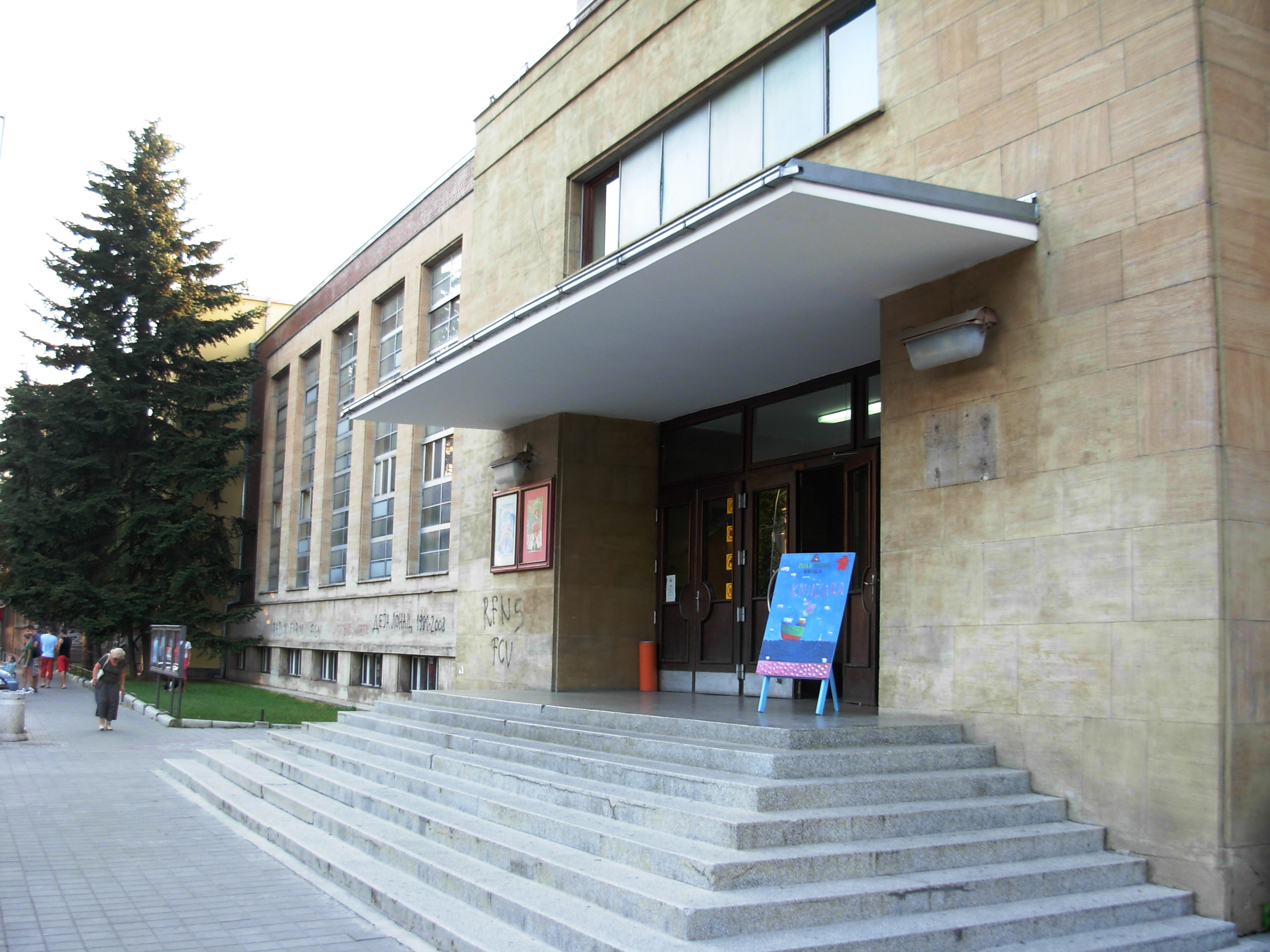
- Youth Theatre entrance

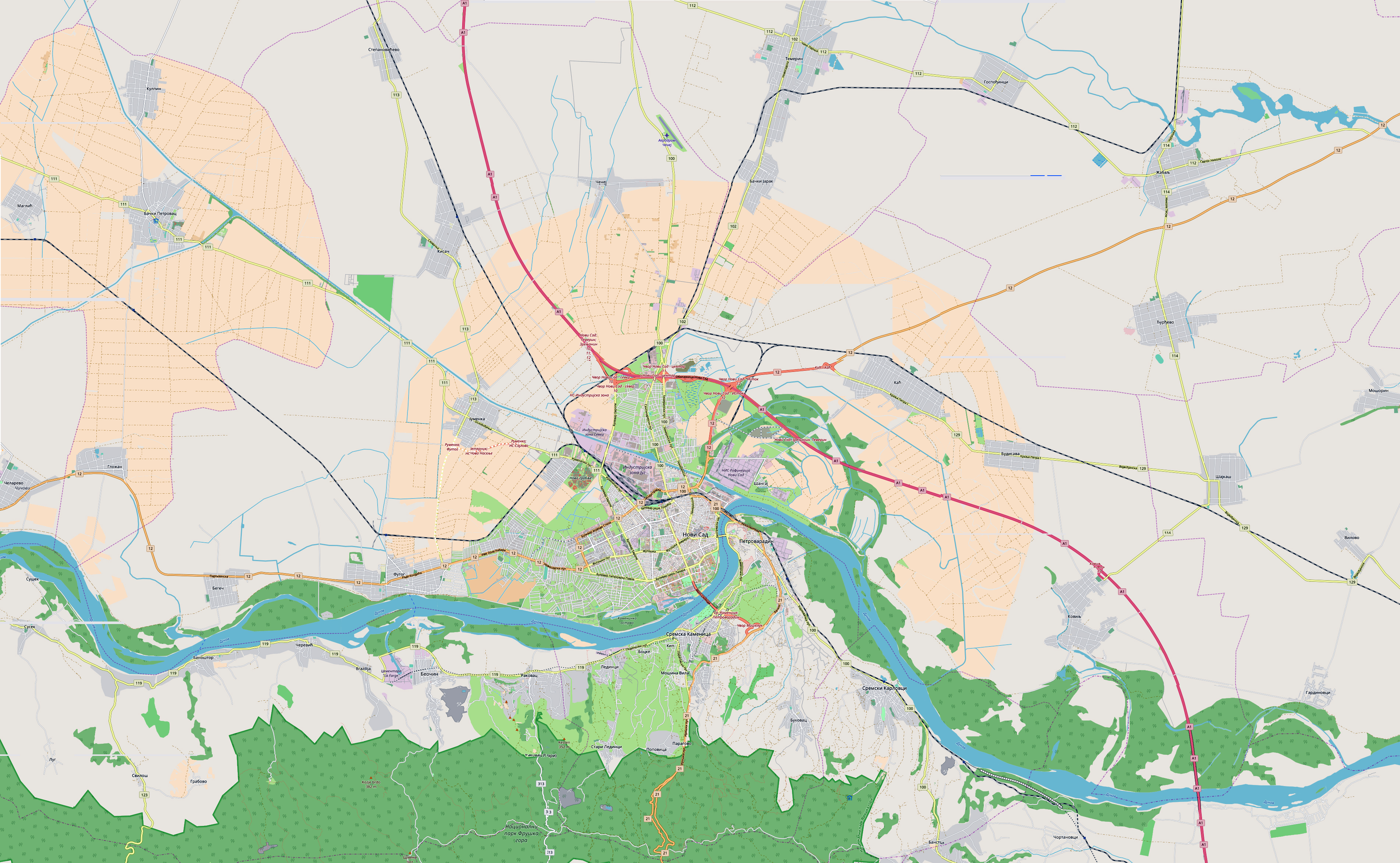
- Location within Novi Sad
- Address: Ignjata Pavlasa 4
- Location: Novi Sad, Serbia
- Coordinates: 45.255254°N 19.848848°E
- Type: Theatre

Construction
- Opened: September 1931; 95 years ago

Website
- pozoristemladih.co.rs

Youth Theatre (Serbian: Позориште младих, Pozorište mladih) is a theatre in Novi Sad, the capital of Vojvodina in Serbia. Youth Theatre has two stages: the children's stage and the evening stage. Its ensemble consists of sixteen permanent characters.

== History ==
The Puppet Theatre, held in September 1931, was the first play performed in Youth Theatre. Over the next few years, a steady turnover of puppeteers continually renewed the group. As their reputation grew, they began to work with resources of better quality. The company played not only on the main stage in Novi Sad, but also often toured around the province of Vojvodina. Plays were performed on Sundays, the only day the audience was unoccupied and able to attend. Tickets were very cheap, and the group often offered performances free of charge.

Youth Theatre was closed during World War II. Afterwards, it reopened under the new name of "Vojvodinian Puppet Theatre". Unfortunately, circumstances were difficult because of the large number of puppets and equipment which were lost or stolen during the war. However, the manager of the Serbian National Theatre, then called the Vojvodinian National Theatre, provided his support to help revive the company.

Soon after, the theatre changed its name to "City Puppet Theatre". From 1952 to 1968, it was simply called the "Puppet Theatre". In November 1968, its name changed again, this time to Youth Theatre, which has remained since that time.

== See also ==
- Serbian National Theatre
- Novi Sad Theatre
- List of theatres in Serbia
