= Serbian National Theatre =

Theatre in Novi Sad, Serbia

- Српско народно позориште Srpsko narodno pozorište

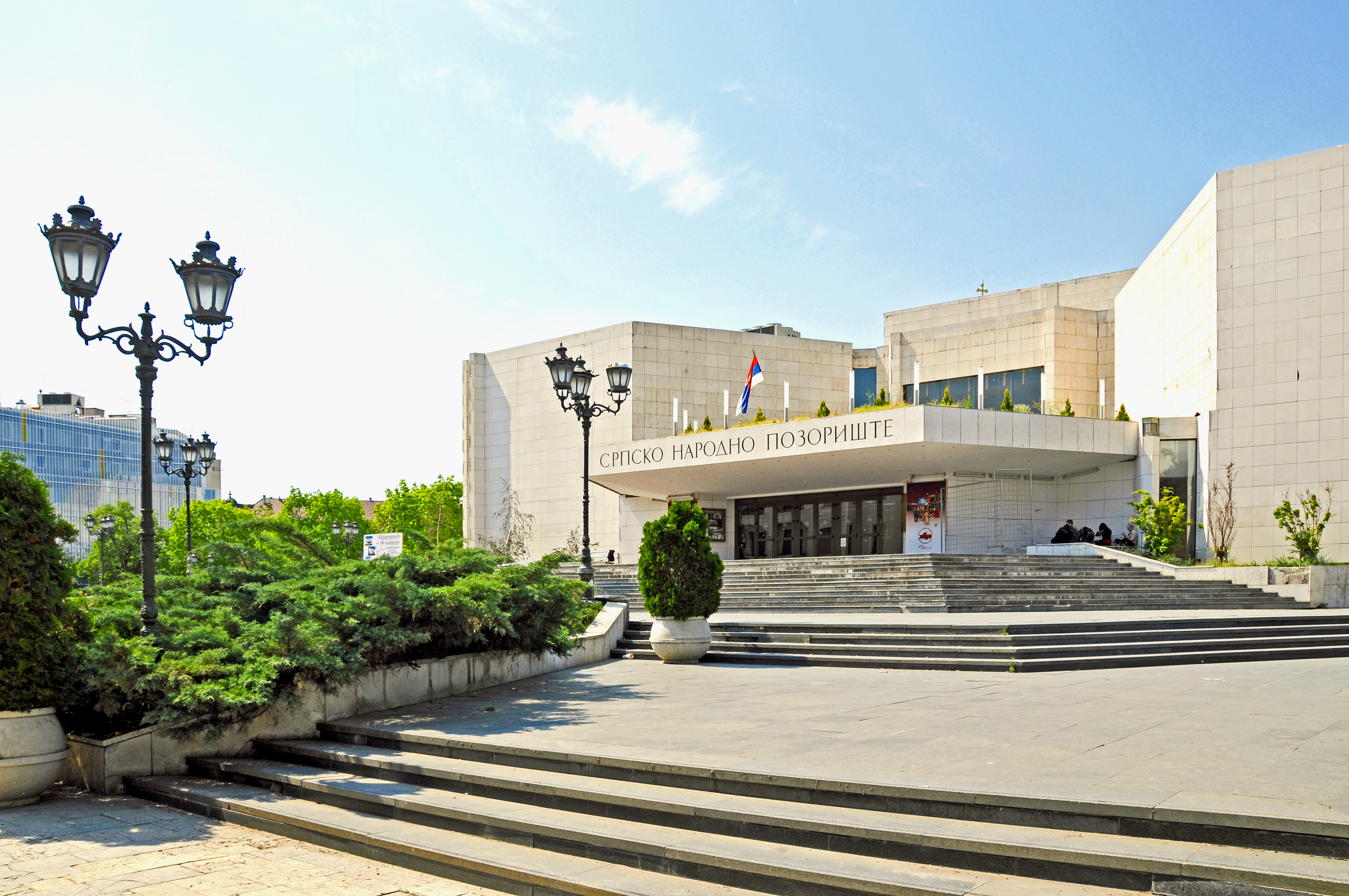

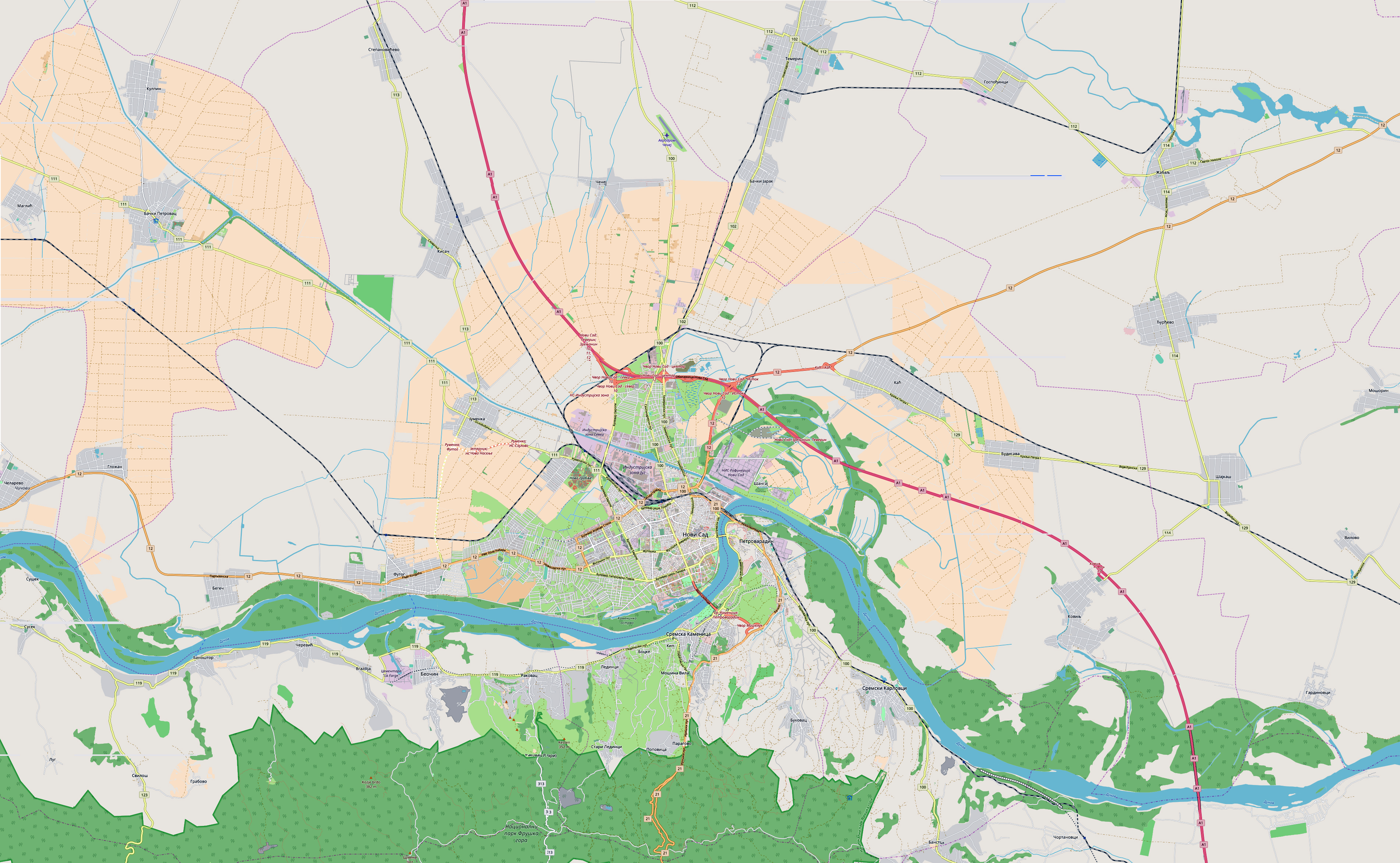
- Location within Novi Sad
- Address: Pozorišni Trg 1
- Location: Novi Sad, Serbia
- Coordinates: 45.2549°N 19.8431°E
- Type: Theatre

Construction
- Opened: 28 July 1861; 165 years ago

Website
- www.snp.org.rs

The Serbian National Theatre (Serbian: Српско народно позориште, Srpsko narodno pozorište), located in Novi Sad, is one of the major theatres of Serbia.

== History ==
The Serbian National Theatre was founded in 1861 during a conference of the Serbian National Theatre Society, composed of members of the Serbian Reading Room (Srpska čitaonica), held in Novi Sad. It is one of the oldest professional theatres among the South Slavs, as the Croatian National Theatre was established in 1860 and the Slovenian National Theatre was founded in 1867 as well.

The current building of the theatre was opened in March 1981. The first general manager of the Serbian National Theatre was Jovan Đorđević and the second was Dimitrije Mihailović. The founding fathers were: Dr. Jovan Andrejević-Joles, Svetozar Miletić, Stevan Branovački, Jovan Jovanović Zmaj, Jovan Đorđević, Dimitrije Ružić, Dimitrije Marković Kikinđanin, Nikola Nedeljković, Dimitrije Mihailović, Kosta Hadžić, Mihailo Gavrilović, Mihailo Racković, Mladen Cvijić, Stevan Čekić and Draginja Popović-Ružić.

An annual theatre festival Sterijino pozorje is held in Serbian National Theatre since 1956.

== Gallery ==
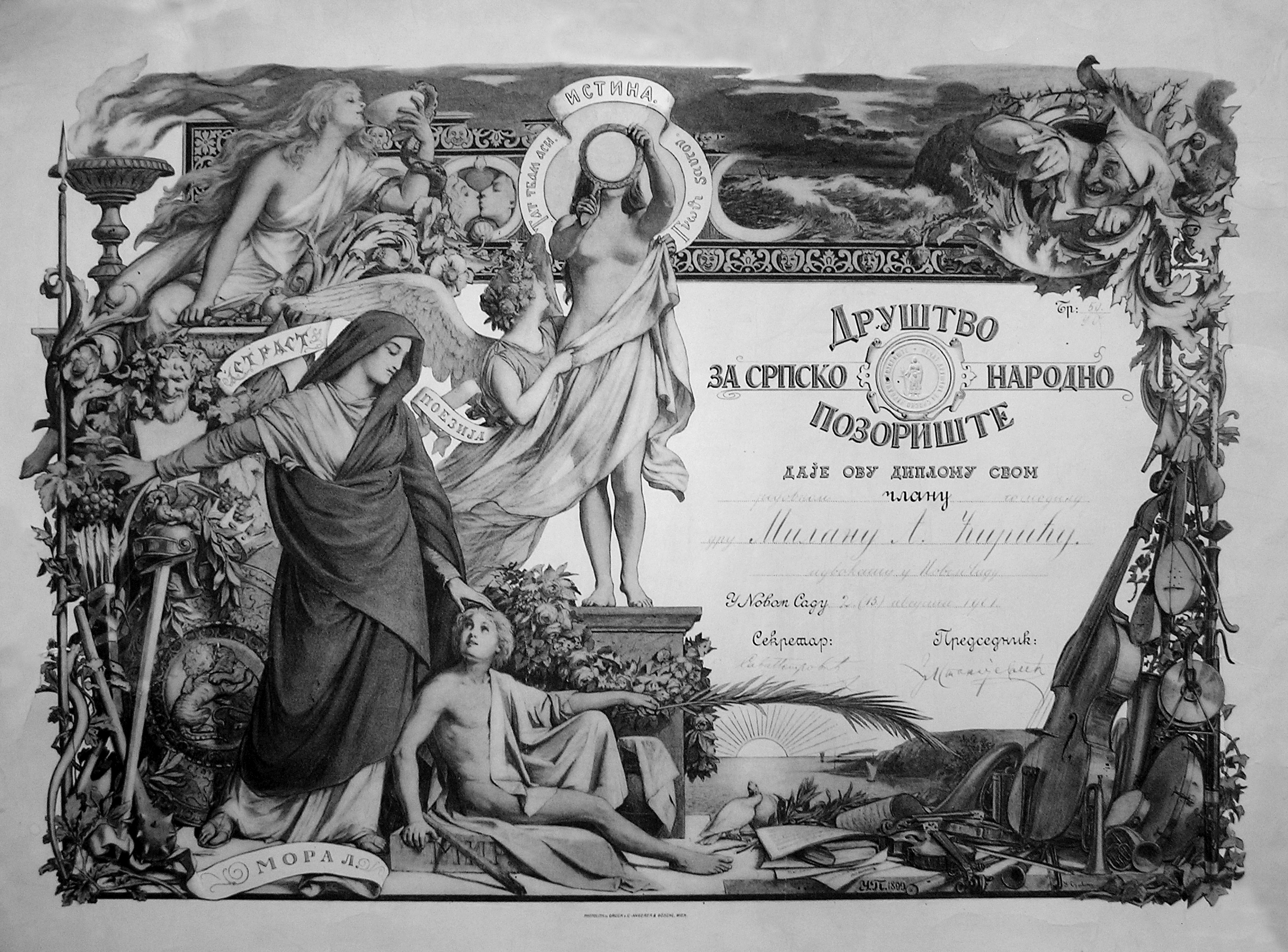
Diploma of Theater's society by Uroš Predić, 1897

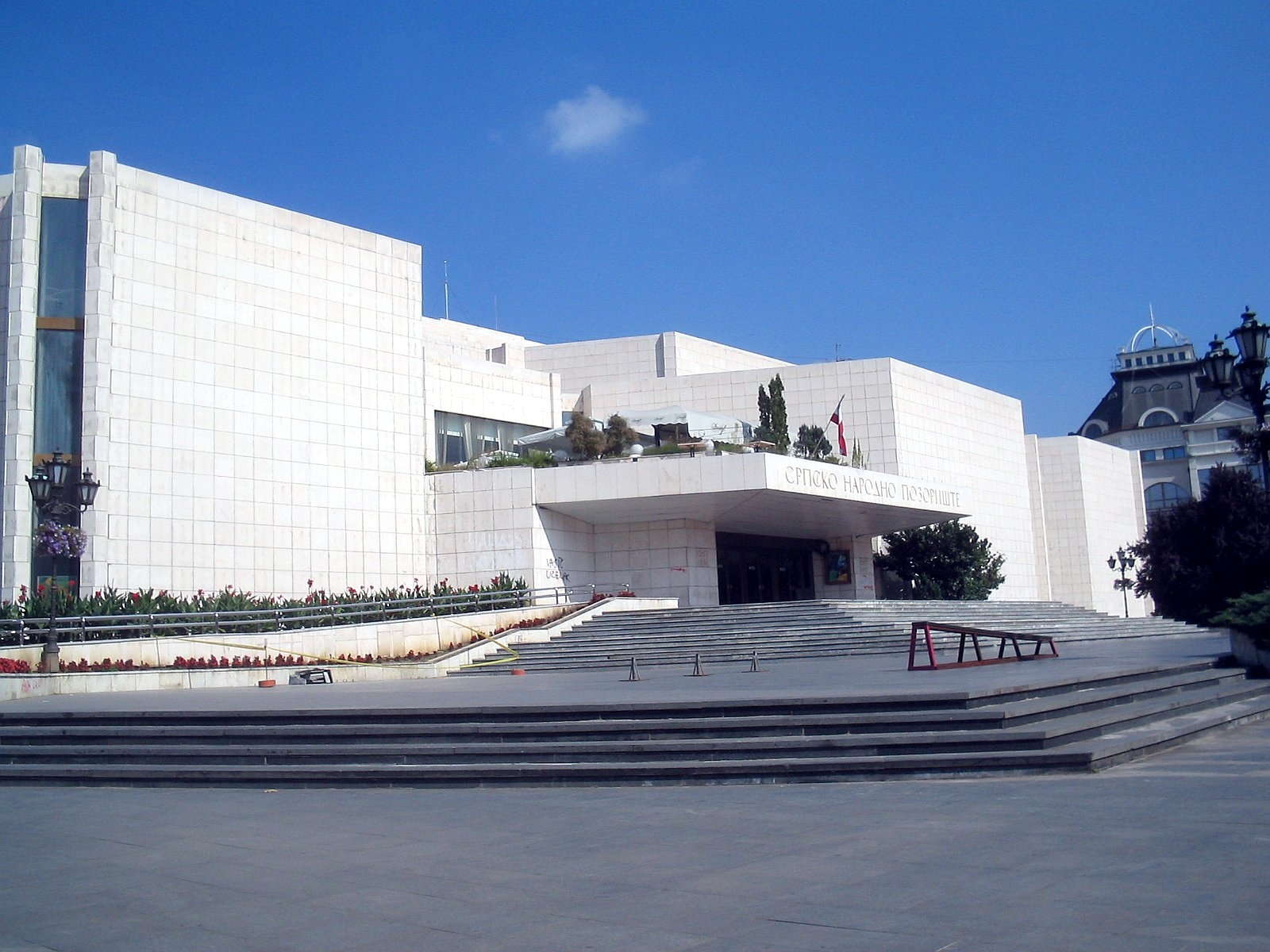
Serbian National Theatre building from outside

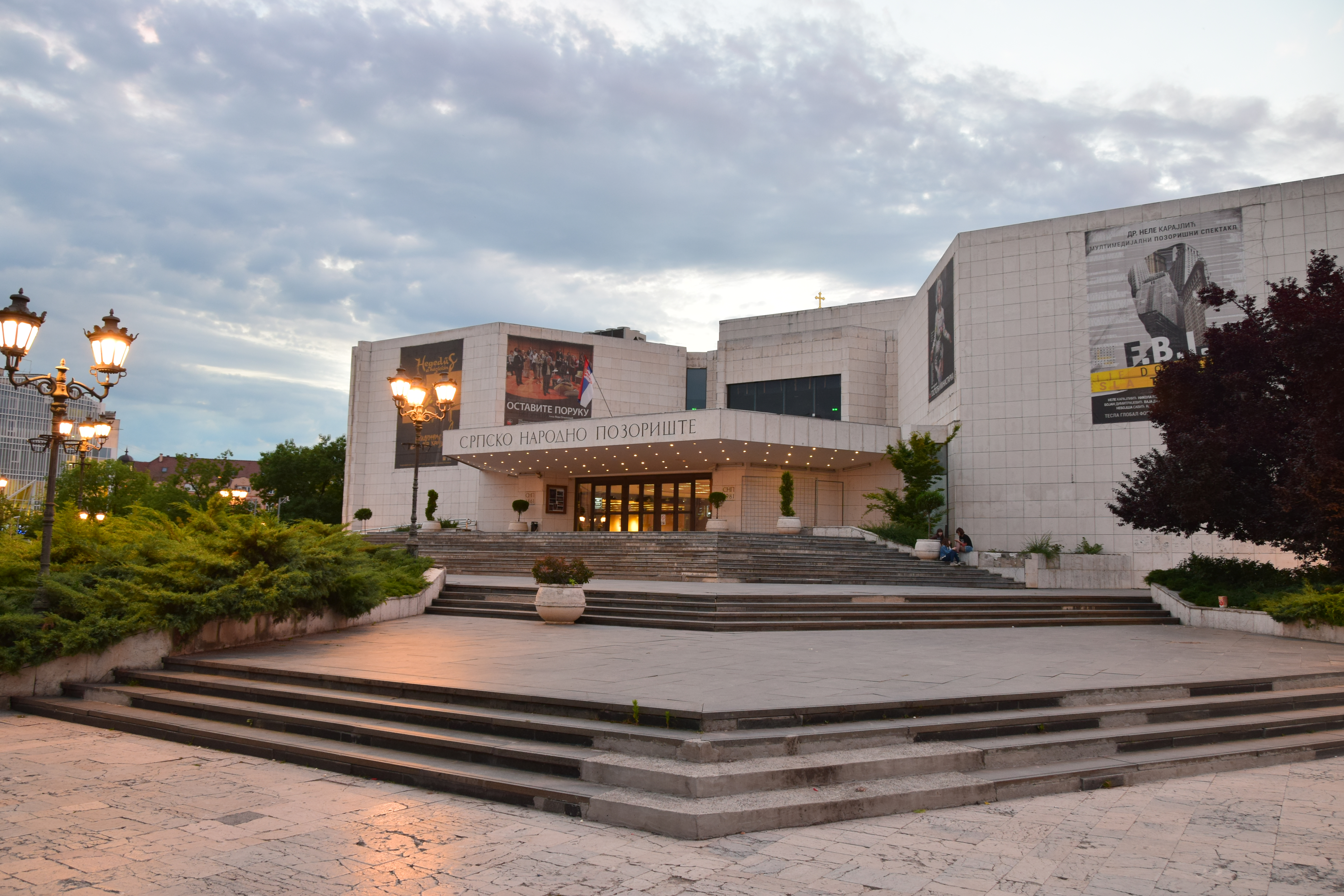
Serbian National Theatre building

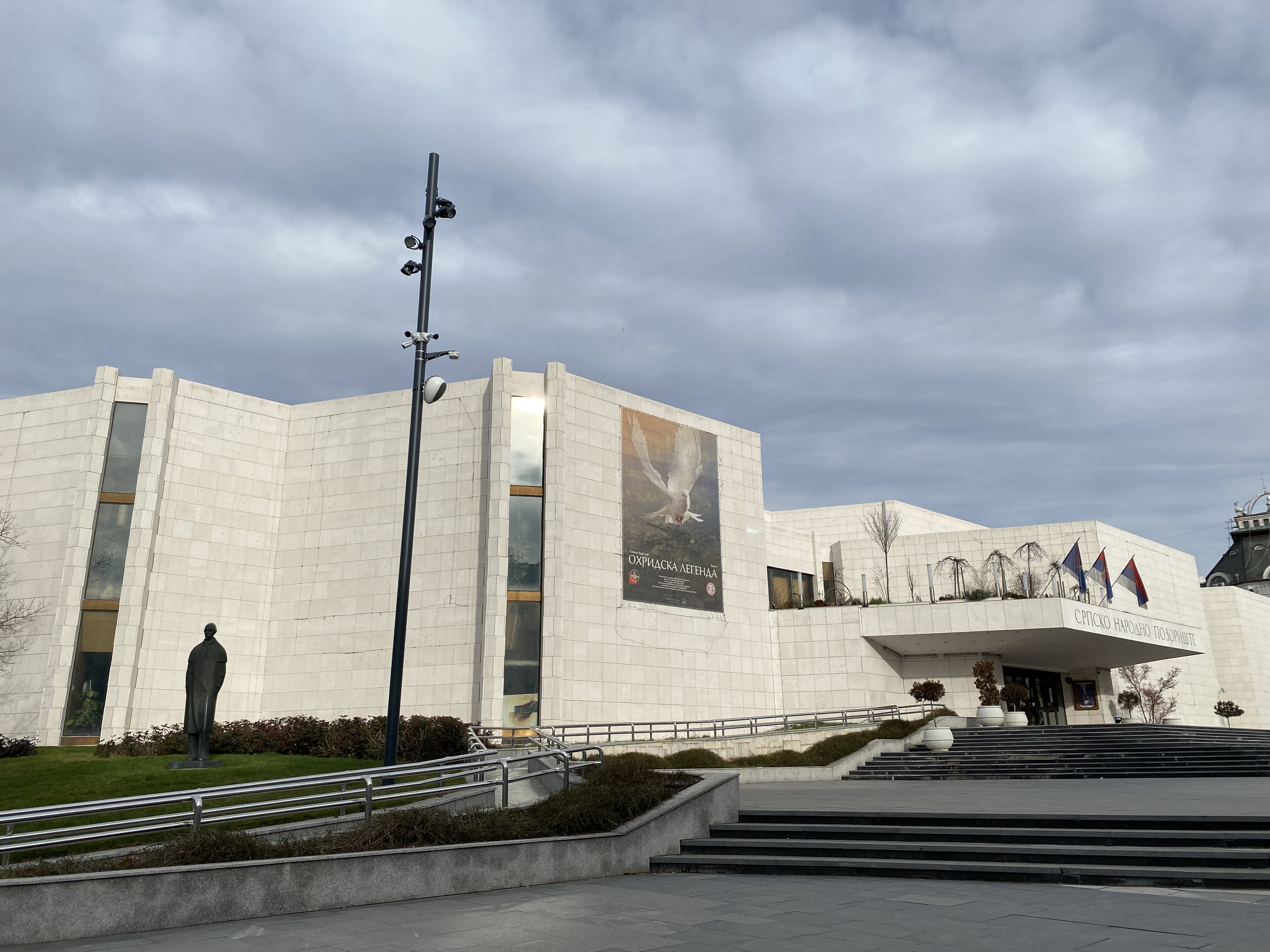
Serbian National Theatre (2022)

== See also ==
- Youth Theatre
- Novi Sad Theatre
- List of theatres in Serbia
