= Gajić =

- Village (Selo)
- Location within Osijek-Baranja County Location within Croatia Location within Europe
- Country: Croatia
- County: Osijek-Baranja
- Municipality: Draž

Area
  - Total: 10.1 km^{2} (3.9 sq mi)

Population (2021)
  - Total: 232
  - Density: 23.0/km^{2} (59.5/sq mi)

Gajić (Hungarian: Hercegmárok, Serbian Cyrillic: Гајић) is a settlement in the region of Baranja, Croatia. Administratively, it is located in the Draž municipality within the Osijek-Baranja County. Population is 294 people (2011).
