= Draž =

- Municipality
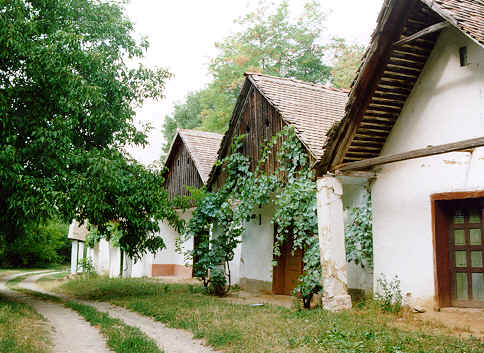
- Šokac houses in Draž

- Flag Coat of arms

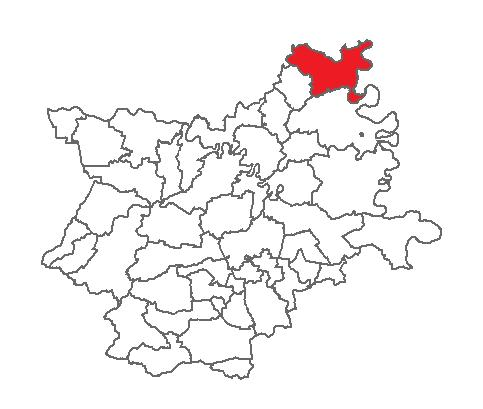
- Location of Draž in Osijek-Baranja County

- Location of Draž in Croatia Draž (Croatia) Draž (Europe)
- Coordinates: 45°50′32″N 18°47′19″E
- Country: Croatia
- Region: Baranja (Podunavlje)
- County: Osijek-Baranja County

Government
  - Načelnik: Stipan Šašlin

Area
  - Municipality: 149.5 km^{2} (57.7 sq mi)
  - Urban: 59.0 km^{2} (22.8 sq mi)

Population (2021)
  - Municipality: 1,949
  - Density: 13.04/km^{2} (33.77/sq mi)
  - Urban: 355
  - Urban density: 6.02/km^{2} (15.6/sq mi)
- Time zone: UTC+1 (CET)
- Website: www.draz.hr

Draž (Hungarian: Darázs, German: Darasch, Serbian Cyrillic: Драж) is a village and municipality in Osijek-Baranja County, Croatia. There are 2,767 inhabitants in the municipality.

== Geography ==
The municipality of Draž is situated between border with Hungary in the north, border with Serbia in the east, municipality of Kneževi Vinogradi in the south, and municipality of Popovac in the south-west.

The municipality of Draž includes the following settlements:

- Draž (pop. 505)
- Batina (pop. 879)
- Duboševica (pop. 554)
- Gajić (pop. 294)
- Podolje (pop. 140)
- Topolje (pop. 395)

== Demographics ==
Ethnic groups in the municipality (2011 census):

- 1931 Croats (69.79%)
- 680 Hungarians (24.58%)
- 90 Serbs (3.25%)

During the Croatian War of Independence (1991–1995), 1300 people were expelled from the municipality. Nearly all have returned since.

== Politics ==
=== Minority councils ===
Directly elected minority councils and representatives are tasked with consulting the local or regional authorities, advocating for minority rights and interests, integration into public life and participation in the management of local affairs. At the 2023 Croatian national minorities councils and representatives elections Hungarians and Serbs of Croatia each fulfilled legal requirements to elect 10 members municipal minority councils of the Draž Municipality but the elections for Serb council were not held due to the lack of candidates.

== Economy ==
The population is chiefly oriented towards crop and livestock farming. In recent times, there is a trend towards food processing and tourism (hunting and angling). Five kilometers of wine roads have been established.

Two major infrastructure projects currently underway are construction of the water supply network and the Batina harbor.

Draž is underdeveloped municipality which is statistically classified as the First Category Area of Special State Concern by the Government of Croatia.

Draž is known as a starting point for eco-tourism due to its pristine and unpolluted nature.

== See also ==
- Osijek-Baranja County
- Baranja
