= Correspondence Theatre =

Theater in Serbia

Correspondence Theatre Дописно позориште Dopisno pozorište
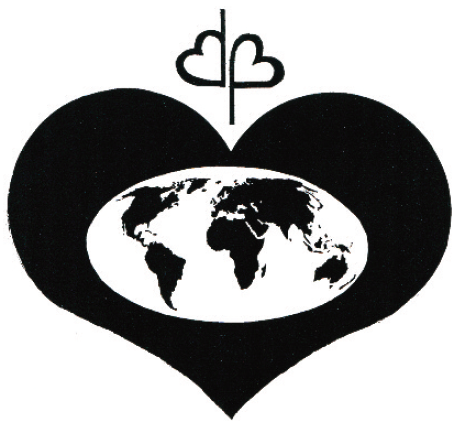
- Correspondence Theatre - proposed coat of arms
- Address: Oblačića Rada 17, Novi Sad; Serbia
- Operator: Mladen Dražetin (founder); Vladimir Stojanov (manager)
- Designation: Correspondence Theatre

Construction
- Opened: 1973
- Years active: 1973 - today

Website
- https://sites.google.com/site/dopisnopozoriste/

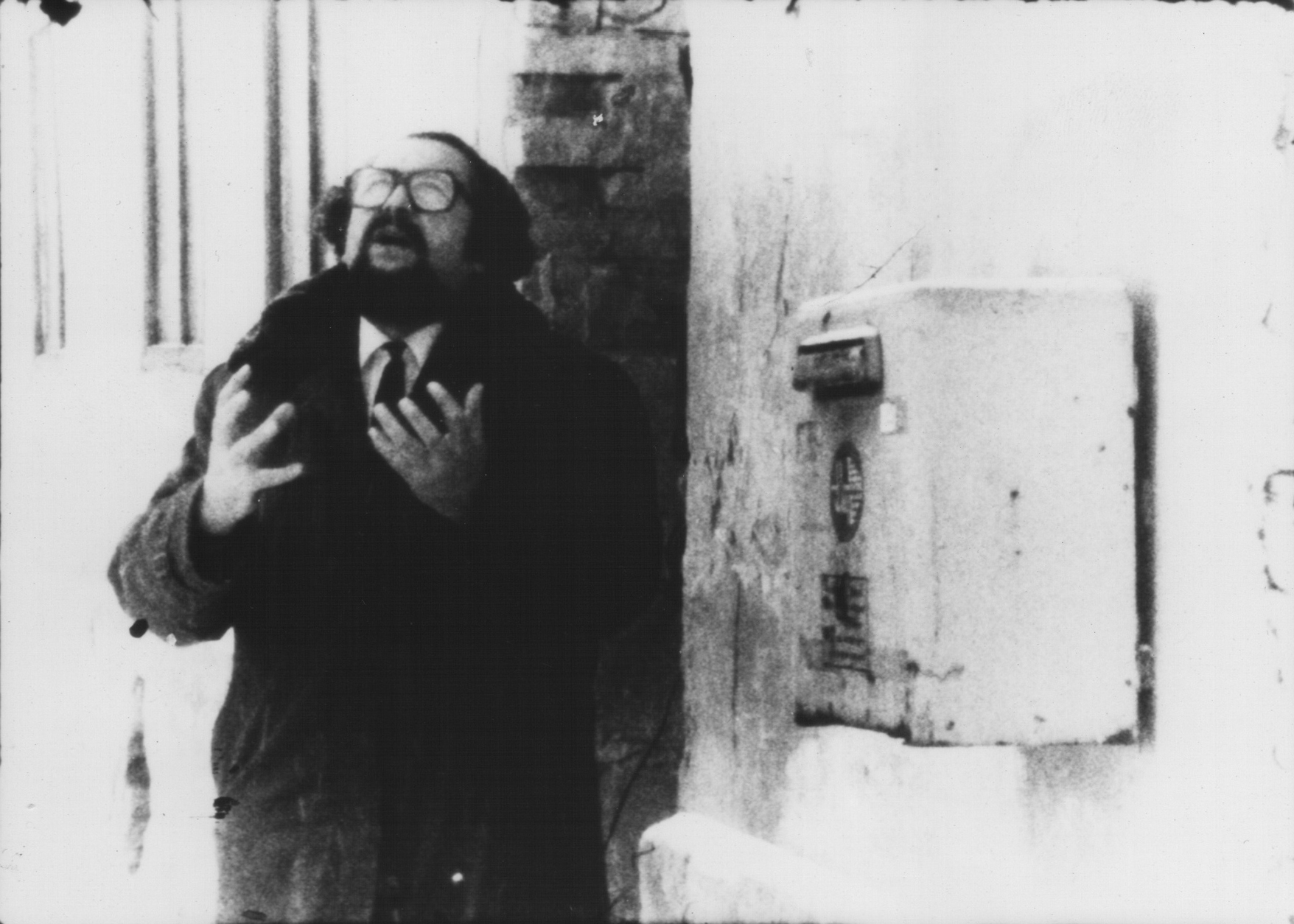
Mladen Dražetin, the founder of the Correspondence Theatre, near the mailbox

The Correspondence Theatre (Serbian: Дописно позориште / Dopisno pozorište) is a specific type of theatrical organization and play, established in Novi Sad (Serbia, then former Yugoslavia) in 1973. This idea was theoretically and practically implemented by Mladen Dražetin from Novi Sad. It was the original model for the spread of theatrical culture among the broad masses.

Theatrical performances were prepared in the cities and small places all over the former Yugoslavia, in accordance with the instructions that, through the Correspondence Theatre, were given to the organizers and protagonists via letters, telephone calls and faxes, sent from Novi Sad. Members of the Correspondence Theatre from Novi Sad, fully free of charge, gave advice and offered any other assistance to the new participants of theatrical life and newly established branches of the Correspondence Theatre, regardless of where were those who needed such assistance. The originality of the model of the Correspondence Theatre brought the attention of many theorists and organizers of theatrical life.

== Establishment ==
The theater was established in 1973, but the authorities of the former Yugoslav state did not permitted its registration under the name "Correspondence Theatre". Thus, the theater worked unregistered for over a year. On March 3, 1974, the license was obtained and the society entered into the register under the name "KUD Drama Art Scene" ("КУД Позорница драмске уметности" / "KUD Pozornica dramske umetnosti"). The seat of the society was in Novi Sad. The Correspondence Theatre itself was a universal animation system that operated within the Drama Art Scene society.

== Objectives ==
The main goal was to collect the image of the world through the democratic indications, based on individual interpretations, to enrich the performances with the variety of experiences, and to encourage the actors and active viewers to abandon the obstacles that bear loneliness and uncommunicativity in the world of conventions and urban impersonality. Theatre was also a system for combating against bureaucracy in culture.

Mladen Dražetin, the founder of the Correspondence Theatre has defined the following objectives and tasks of the theater:

- Initiation of the theory of cultural humanization of the world;
- Initiation of the universal animation system and the theory of universal organization;
- Cultural shaping of the personality and the environment and realization of elementary culture of every man, "that we all think for ourselves, to create the general progress and general human peace through the culture";
- Further creation of a universal cultural power as an ideology, strategy and tactics.

== Cast ==
Actors in the performances were amateurs who have just learned the basic elements of acting, but also professionals, who wanted contact with a different model of work and play with the world of theater admirers.

== Theatres ==
Plays on the stage were directed at achieving the individual satisfaction of holders of roles during the direct communication with the audience. Within this model, the dramatic, humorous and ecological theaters were realized, as well as stage calls for peacekeeping and humanitarian actions. The puppet and live plays in children's institutions and hospitals were also performed. Each participant of the plays had the possibility to propose thematic area and then spontaneously, with writers and other actors, to build the content that necessarily has a humanist meaning.

Micro - theaters of the Correspondence Theatre included the Healthcare Theatre, the Theatre "Taste of Nature", the Roma Theater, the Theater of Peace, the Theater of Humor (the Tournament of Wittiness), the Humanitarian Theater, the Theater in Nature, the Theatre of Associated Labor, the Partisan Theater, the Children's Theater, the School Theater, the Christian Theater of Philokalia, the Literary Theater, etc.

== Performances ==
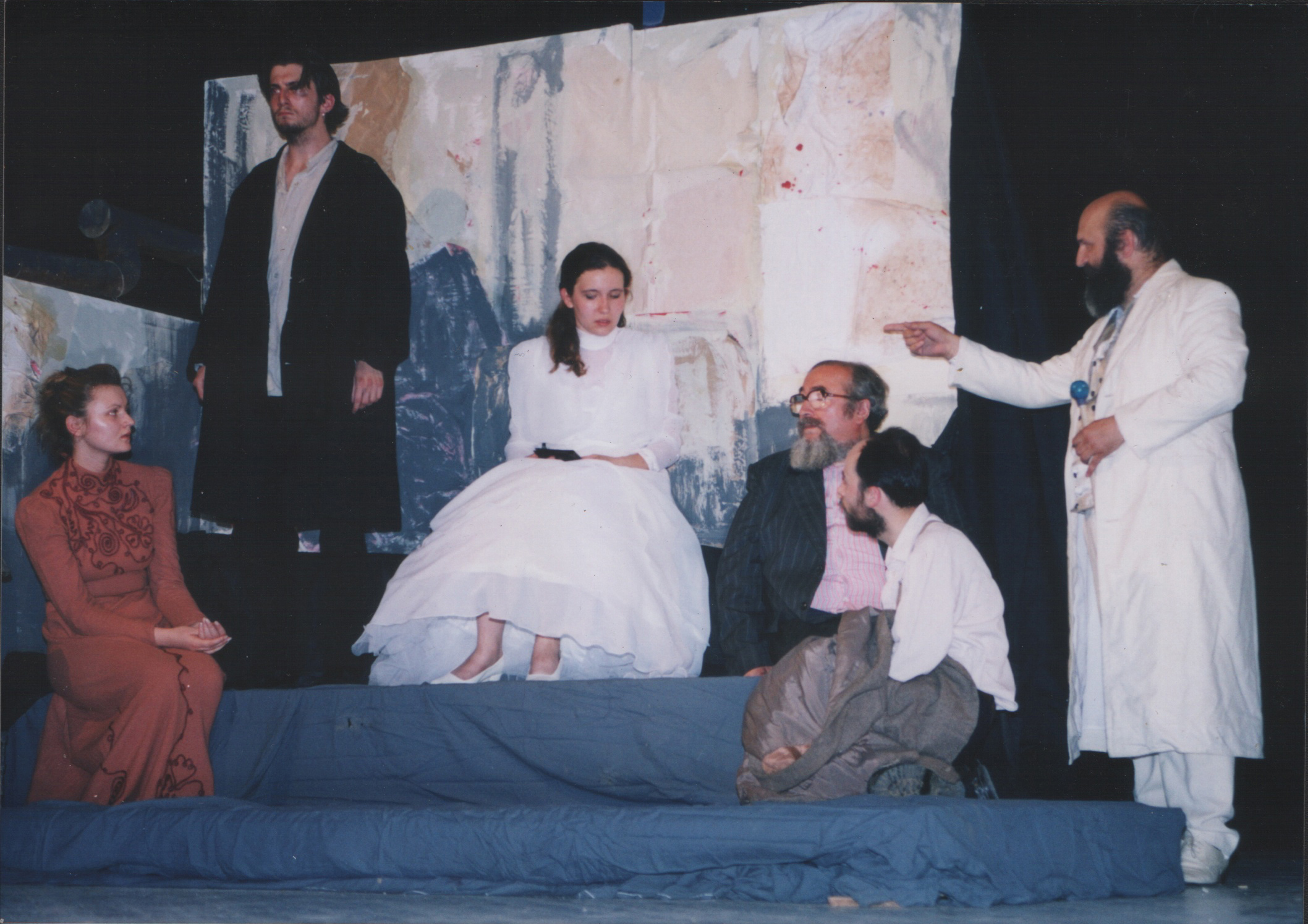
Theater play "Crime and Punishment" (by Fyodor Dostoevsky) performed by actors of the theater "Slovo" Trebinje (Jefimija Dučić, Vladimir Balašćak, Aleksandra Mrkonja) and actors of the Correspondence Theatre and Drama Art Scene (Mladen Dražetin, Srđan Simić, Vladimir Stojanov), Trebinje, 2002-2003

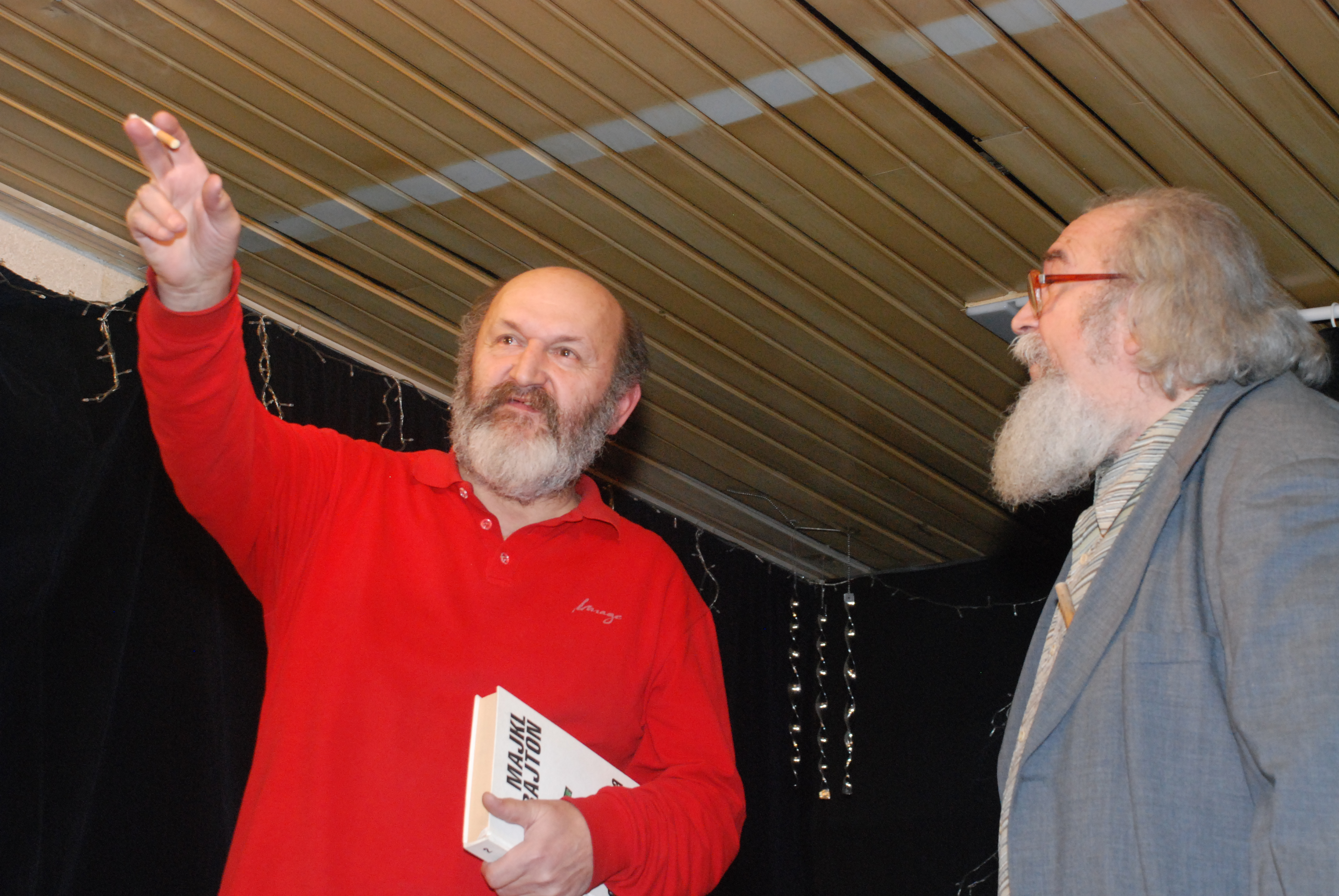
Theatre play "Zoo Story" (by Edward Albee) played by the actors of the Correspondence Theatre and Drama Art Scene (Vladimir Stojanov and Mladen Dražetin), Novi Sad, 2015

The Correspondence Theatre also used texts from classical dramatic literature, but the characters were adapted to the participants in the play, some were left out or summarized. Before performances, the surveys among viewers were conducted in some areas, aiming to reveal their preferences and to choose the theme which was the expression of their life problems and dilemmas. As the spectators at the performances were also introduced into the play, the ramp of the classical theater has been shattered. Performances were given out in the villages, where residents for the first time met with the theater, as well as on the stages of professional theaters in the cities.

== Members and Associates ==
In the inspirational work through the Correspondence Theatre, the following professionals, amateurs and other collaborators have participated: Mladen Dražetin, Vladimir Stojanov, Eleni Andoniadu, Branislav Babić, Persida Bajić, Radmila Brkić, Jelica Bukvić, Verica Viklerović, Radovan Vlahović, Goran Vukčević, Slavica Vučetić, Jasna Gojević, Radovan Grkovski, Toma Daskalović, Miša Dimitrijević, Trifun Dimić, Josip Dobrik, Vladimir Đukić, Nada Đurđević, Jovan Žekov, Nikola Zlatović, Vesna Gavrilov, Milan Jandrić, Stevan Kovačević, Radmila Kravić, Svetlana Lazić, Ante Laura, Zvonimir Lozić, Branko Lukač, Mirko Marušić, Sanja Mikitišin, Boriša Milićević, Velimir Milovanović, Danijela Mihić, Ljubinka Modić, Mihajlo Molnar, Leposava Nastić, Radenko Nenezić, Gordana Opalić, Marija Maša Opalić, Đorđe Plavšić, Ilija Putić, Miroslav Radonjić, Pera Savić, Danilo Simeunović, Srđan Simić, Ceca Slavković, Desimir Stefanović, Boris Stojanov, Milica Stojanov, Boban Stojkov, Boža Stojkov, Eva Feldeždi, Dubravka Herget, Mira Cocin, Milorad Čubrilo, Joakim Šima, Slavko Šimunić, Nenad Šimunović and others. Theater had help via advice and the direct involvement from the famous theater workers Milenko Šuvaković, Mihailo Vasiljević, and Oliver Novaković, as well as via acting from the theater doyens of Novi Sad Ivan Hajtl and Milica Radaković.

== Work in the world ==
Through its work, the Correspondence Theatre or the "correspondent system" established itself on the planetary level, via the Planetary School of Peace, the Humanitarian Planetary School and the Christian Planetary School of Love and Philokalia. The Planetary School of Peace, within the Correspondence Theatre, developed its activity in the period from 1974 to 2005. These "planetary schools" for education and animation of citizens were forerunners of Internet in various countries. The Correspondence Theatre has established information centers in Novi Sad and Zagreb, through which the animation and education of the masses were performed. Member of the Correspondence Theatre Josip Dobrik from Gložan constructed a two amateur radio stations through which the communication was performed with radio amateurs in the world. Dobrik, according to the method of the Correspondence Theatre, has animated associates in 186 countries, who have accepted to be the main coordinators of the Correspondence Theatre and to perform animation and education of people in their country through their radio stations. For 30 years of work of the Correspondence Theatre, the Information Center of this theatre in Novi Sad processed over 100,000 letters of interested collaborators of the Correspondence Theatre. The Correspondence Theatre have initiated, formed and trained, via the work of 186 coordinators, over 50,000 micro - theaters in 186 countries. These Micro - theaters were formed by the collaborators, according to their own wishes and ideas. Micro - theaters have had informal obligation to animate and educate about 60,000 citizens. By this, over three billion people were animated and partially educated, in order to understand how to fight for peace, humanism and their noble ideas. In all these micro - theaters, as the first educational reading, the social drama of Mladen Dražetin named "The Confession" (Serbian: "Исповест" / "Ispovest") was processed. This Drama deals with the problems of juvenile delinquency and substance abuse. It was translated into Esperanto language and had over 80,000 performances.

== Languages ==
In addition to the Information Centre which performed the work in English with amateur radio stations, the Correspondence Theatre Information Centre in Zagreb carried out its activities in the Esperanto language. Esperanto center has processed more than 40,000 letters. The Correspondence Theatre had its missionary esperanto offices in 105 countries. These offices translated the obtained letters into their national languages and directed the associates into the mode of operation on the ground. Additional Information Centre of the Correspondence Theatre which operated in Esperanto language was based in Novi Sad, with the activity in the premises of Society for Esperanto "Marko Nešić".

The main coordinator of the Esperanto language Information Centre of the Correspondence Theatre in Zagreb was Slavko Šimunić. The members of the Correspondence Theatre which are most creditable for the functioning of the Subsidiary Esperanto language Information Centre of the Correspondence Theatre in Novi Sad were Boriša Milićević, Vladimir Đukić and Joakim Šima. Within the Society for Esperanto "Marko Nešić", the Correspondence Theatre has established a micro - theater which prepared various theater plays in Esperanto language, as the first in the world. This micro - theater prepared about ten plays, performances and recitals, which were carried out all over the Europe.

== Letters ==
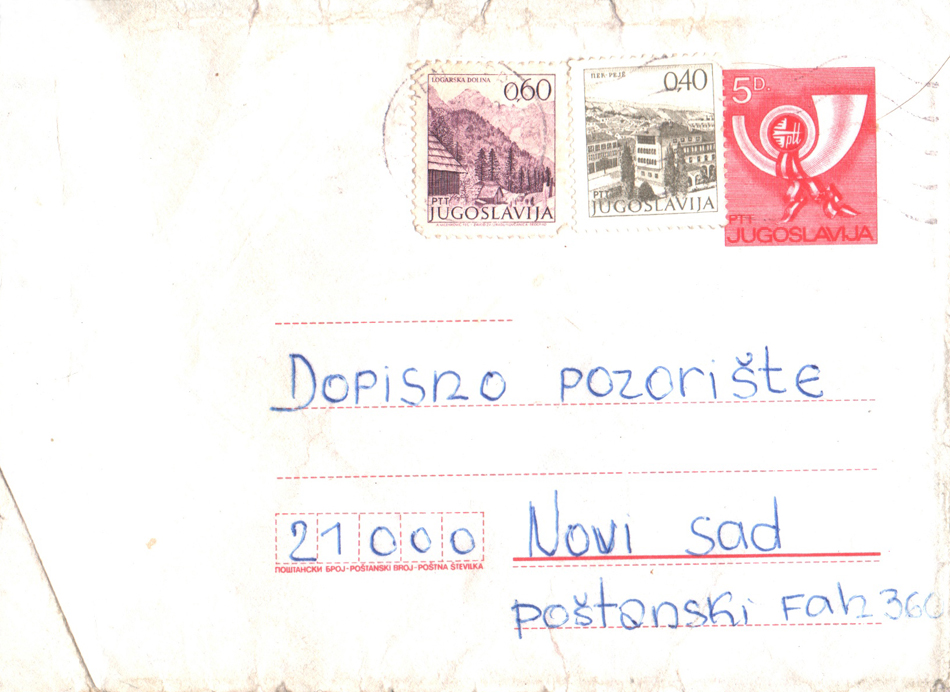
Letter addressed to the Correspondence Theatre

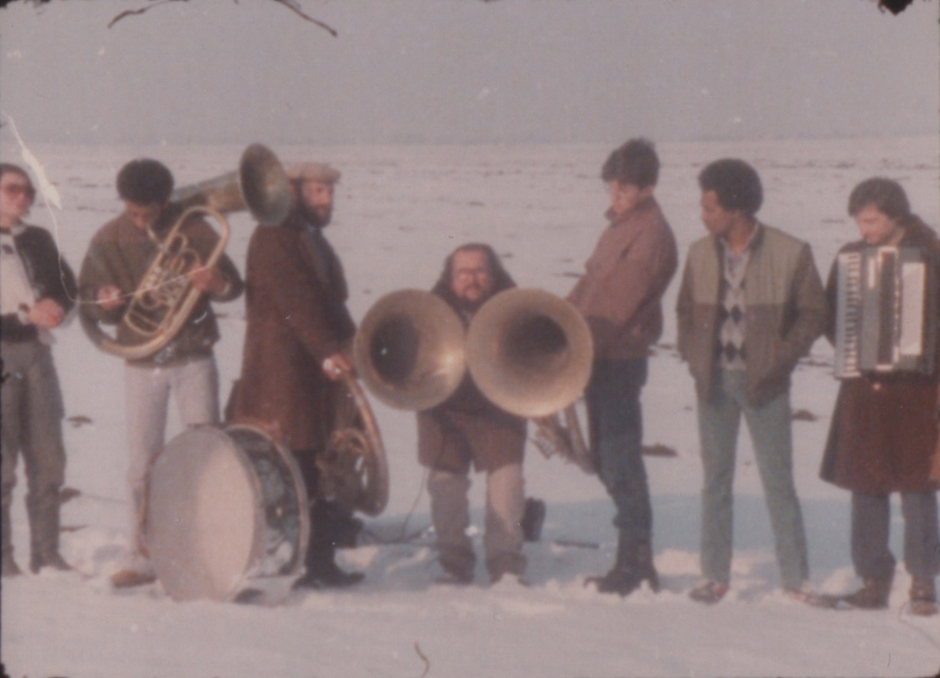
A scene from the documentary film about the Correspondence Theatre (1985)

Letters for the Information Centre of the Correspondence Theatre in Novi Sad, addressed to a post office box number 360 - Correspondence Theatre, arrived from all over the world. Every letter has received adequate attention. The triage of the letters was performed by about thirty associates. During the ten years since the foundation of the Correspondence Theatre, the conversations with more than 100,000 associates were achieved. They became the founders of "cultural embryos" and "micro theaters" in their communities.

== TV show about the Correspondence Theatre ==
TV show (documentary film) about the Correspondence Theatre named the "Correspondence Theatre of Mladen Dražetin" (Serbian: "Дописно позориште Младена Дражетина" / "Dopisno pozorište Mladena Dražetina"; TV Novi Sad, 1985), directed by Petar Ljubojev, has received the first prize "Grand Prih" for the new ideas in culture, at the festival in Monte Carlo in 1986. The show was shown on national televisions in 205 countries.

This show has been nominated in 2012 for entry in the International Memory of the World Register of UNESCO.

== Theoretical basis ==
For more than 30 years of work of the Correspondence Theatre, an ethical, aesthetical and social system called the "eternal art of the play" as a philosophy of new development has been created. The book of Mladen Dražetin about this system, with the title "Eternal art of the play" (Serbian: "Вечна уметност игре" / "Večna umetnost igre"), has been published in 2014 by the Banat Cultural Center from Novo Miloševo.

== Cultural education of Roma people ==
The Correspondence Theatre initiated the establishment of the first Roma theater in Vojvodina and Serbia in Novo Miloševo (in 1986). The first performance of this theater was the drama "Kulaj" of Radovan Vlahović. The second Roma theater in Vojvodina was established in the village of Mokrin (in 1988), in accordance to the forms of the Correspondence Theatre.

== Literature ==
- Pozornica - list amaterskih pozorišta, godina I, broj 1, Novi Sad, 1975.
- Vlado Mićunović, Tragovi vremena, Novi Sad, 1990. (chapter: Teatar jedinstven u svetu)
- Mr Mladen Dražetin, Duhovni preobražaj Roma putem sveprisutnog sistema Dopisnog Pozorišta, Romologija - časopis za književnost, kulturu i društvena pitanja Roma, Novi Sad, 1993, broj 3.
- Almanah pozorišta Vojvodine 28, 1993/94, Pozorišni muzej Vojvodine, Novi Sad, 1995.
- Dr Petar Ljubojev, Dopisno pozorište, Enciklopedija Novog Sada, sveska 7, Novi Sad, 1996.
- Almanah pozorišta Vojvodine 29, 1994/95, Pozorišni muzej Vojvodine, Novi Sad, 1996.
- Almanah pozorišta Vojvodine 30, 1995/96, Pozorišni muzej Vojvodine, Novi Sad, 1997.
- Almanah pozorišta Vojvodine 31, 1996/97, Pozorišni muzej Vojvodine, Novi Sad, 1998.
- Almanah pozorišta Vojvodine 32, 1997/98, Pozorišni muzej Vojvodine, Novi Sad, 1999.
- Almanah pozorišta Vojvodine 33, 1998/99, Pozorišni muzej Vojvodine, Novi Sad, 2000.
- Almanah pozorišta Vojvodine 34, 1999/2000, Pozorišni muzej Vojvodine, Novi Sad, 2001.
- Mladen Dražetin, Pozornica dramske umetnosti, Enciklopedija Novog Sada, knjiga 20, Novi Sad, 2002.
- Almanah pozorišta Vojvodine 36, 2001/2002, Pozorišni muzej Vojvodine, Novi Sad, 2005.
- Mladen Dražetin, O Dopisnom pozorištu, Sveske za istoriju Novog Sada, broj 14, Novi Sad, 2013.
- Mladen Dražetin, Večna umetnost igre - filozofija novog razvoja (teorija i praksa), Prvi srpski filozofski sistem, Banatski kulturni centar, Novo Miloševo, 2014.
- Vlado Mićunović, Prvi romski teatri u Srbiji i Vojvodini, Novi Sad, 2014.
- Mirjana Hadžić, Slavuj Hadžić - život mišljen slikom, Artprint media, Novi Sad, 2014.
- Mladen Dražetin, Univerzalni animatorski sistem Dopisno pozorište - korespondentni process igre (teorija i praksa), Šajkaš - Novi Sad, 2017.
- Vlado Mićunović, Teatar jedinstven u svetu - Dopisno pozorište, Banatski kulturni centar, Novo Miloševo, 2019.
- Mladen Dražetin, Večna umetnost igre - filozofija novog razvoja (teorija i praksa), Prvi srpski filozofski sistem, drugo izdanje, Banatski kulturni centar, Novo Miloševo, 2019.
