= Novi Sad Theatre =

- Новосадско позориште Újvidéki Színház
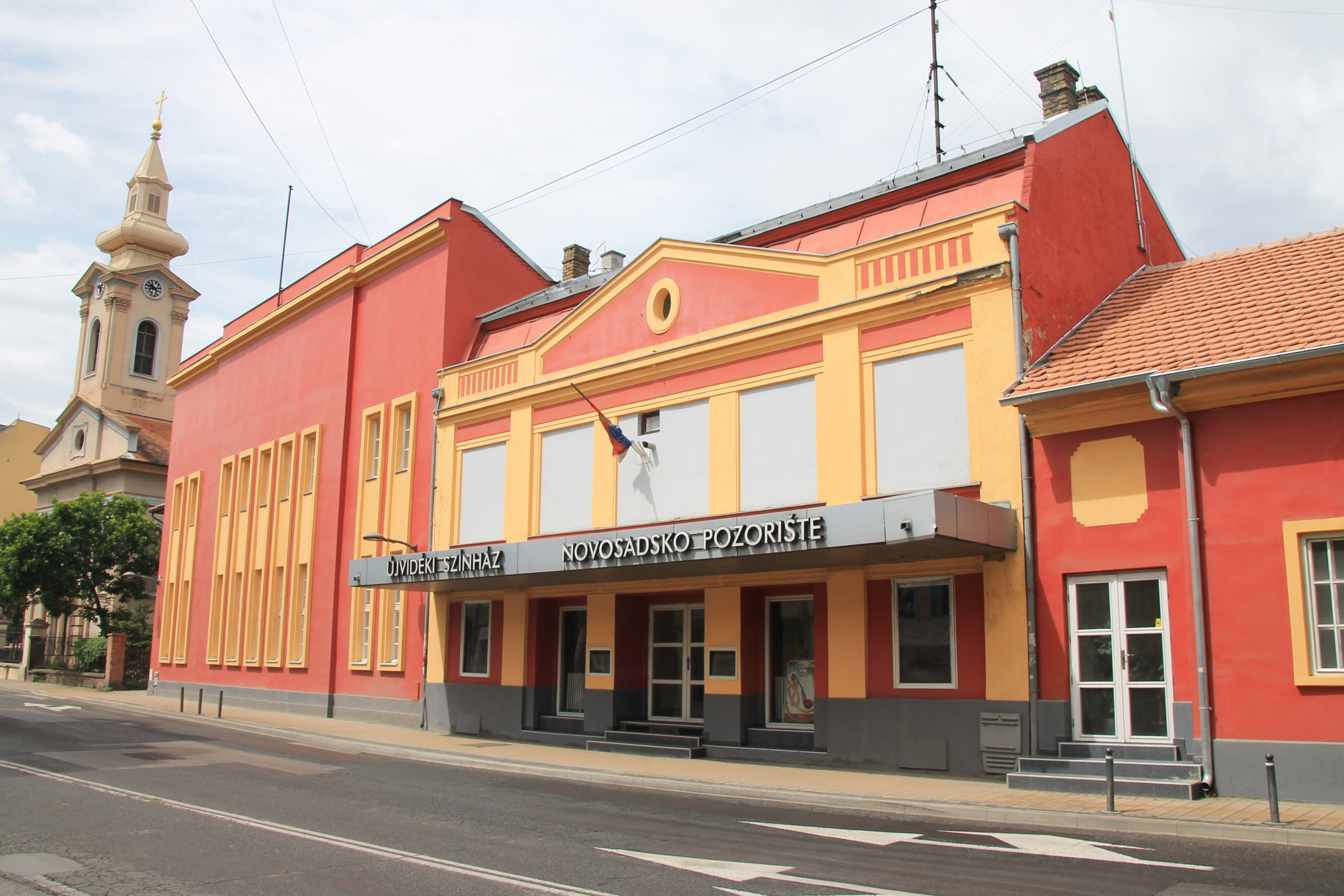
- The building of the theatre in May 2020

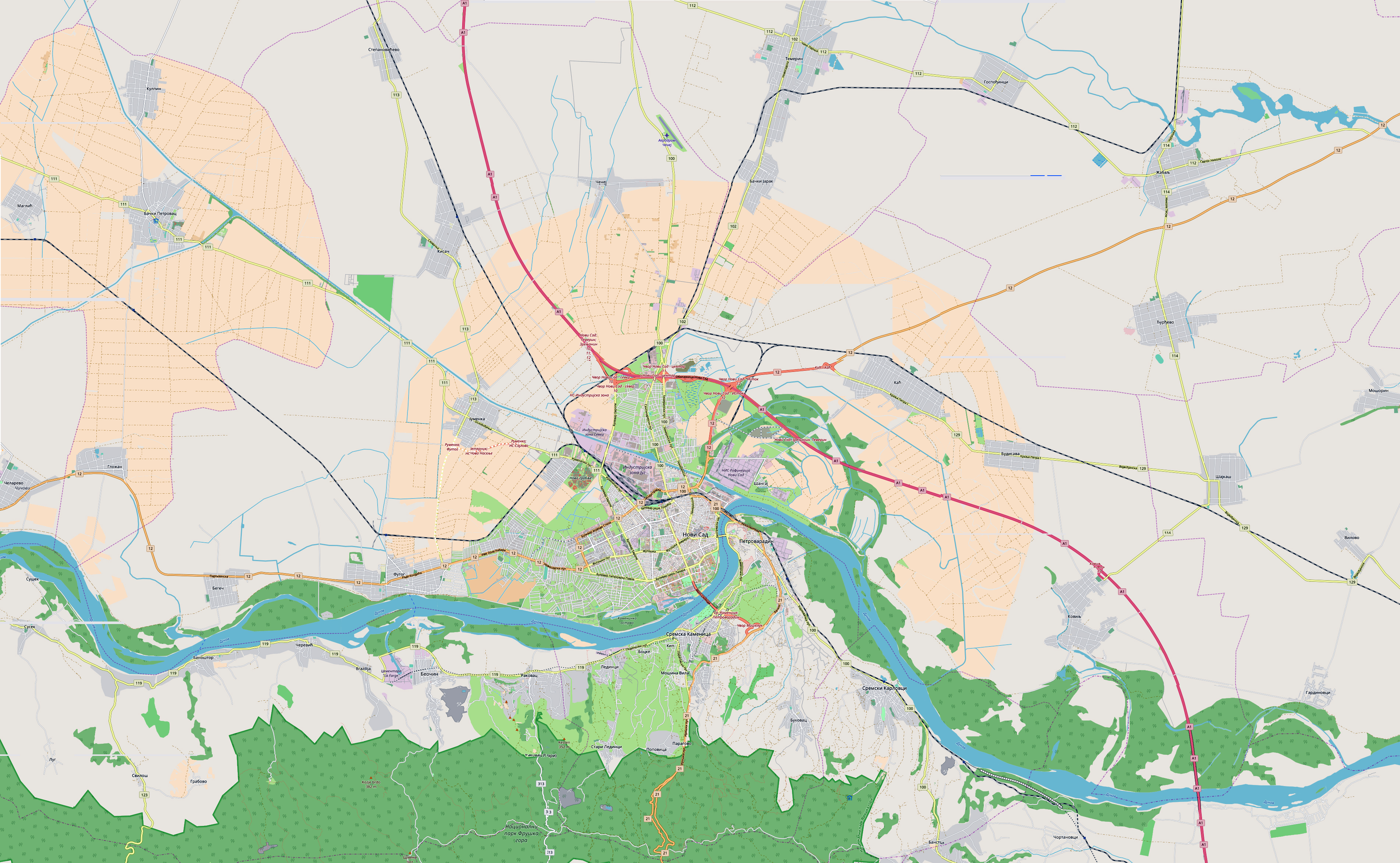
- Location within Novi Sad
- Address: Jovana Subotića St. 3-5
- Location: Novi Sad, Serbia
- Coordinates: 45.257740°N 19.841766°E
- Operator: Valentin Vencel
- Type: Theatre

Construction
- Opened: 27 January 1974; 52 years ago
- Renovated: 2019
- Expanded: 2019

Website
- www.uvszinhaz.com

The Novi Sad Theatre (Serbian: Новосадско позориште, Novosadsko pozorište; Hungarian: Újvidéki Színház) is a small Hungarian language theatre in Serbia. It is located in the Rotkvarija neighborhood, near city centre on Jovana Subotića street 3–5, in Novi Sad, the capital of the Serbian province Vojvodina.

== History ==
The theatre was established in 1974, and its first play was Örkény István's Macskajáték, which was held on 27 January 1974. Before that time, there was only one Hungarian language theatre in Vojvodina, and it was located in Subotica. In 1985, the company moved to the premises of the former Ben Akiba Theatre and has since become its permanent headquarters.

Over time, this theatre outgrew its original purpose and became a place where more complex theatre stories were created. Initially created to nurture Hungarian language, culture, traditions, Novi Sad Theatre has become not just a gathering place for the Hungarian elite but has also transcended the national-linguistic framework and is now considered one of the most influential and relevant theaters in Serbia and in the region, with international significance. The theater was successful in local and regional festivals, from Serijino pozorje, to Bitefa do Festival in Umag and Sarajevo.

Plays performed nowadays in Hungarian would also have simultaneous translations into Serbian.

The theater is the seat of the International Minority Theatre Organization, also hosting the International Festival of Minority Theatre. Every year the theater hosts the drama competition of Vojvodina Hungarian drama writers.

In October 2013, extensive restoration and renovation efforts started with the aid of the city of Novi Sad, as well cooperation with local Hungarian and Serbian political parties. The large theatre stage hall was refurbished and equipped with updated equipment, the outer façade and roof were restored, and a new gallery warehouse section was built. Full renovation and restoration efforts are estimated to have cost 24 million dinars.

In October 2019, the Novi Sad Theater building was inaugurated by local politicians and the theater director from the newly restored and renovated large theater stage hall.

== Gallery ==
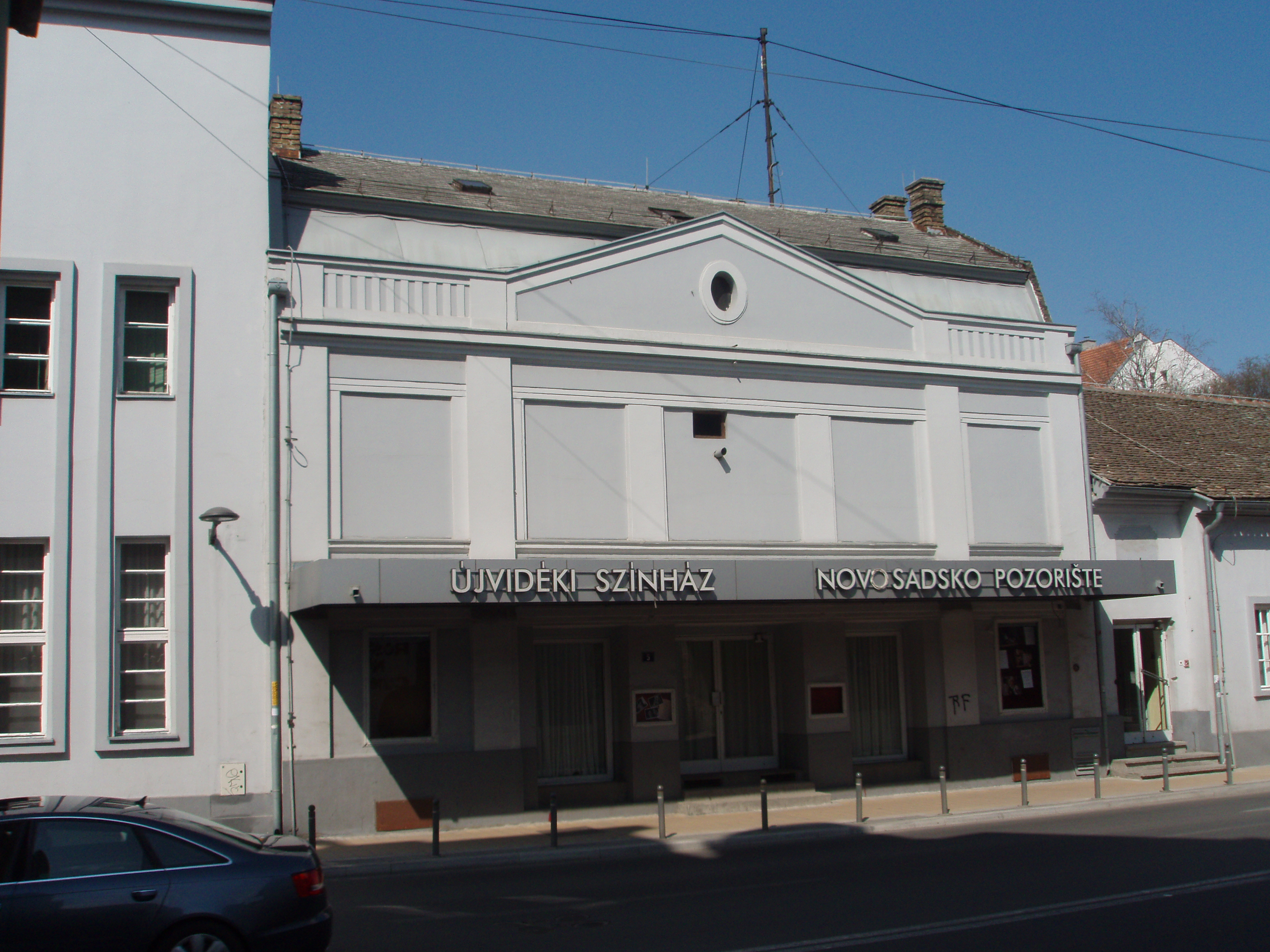
Novi Sad Theater entrance in April 2009

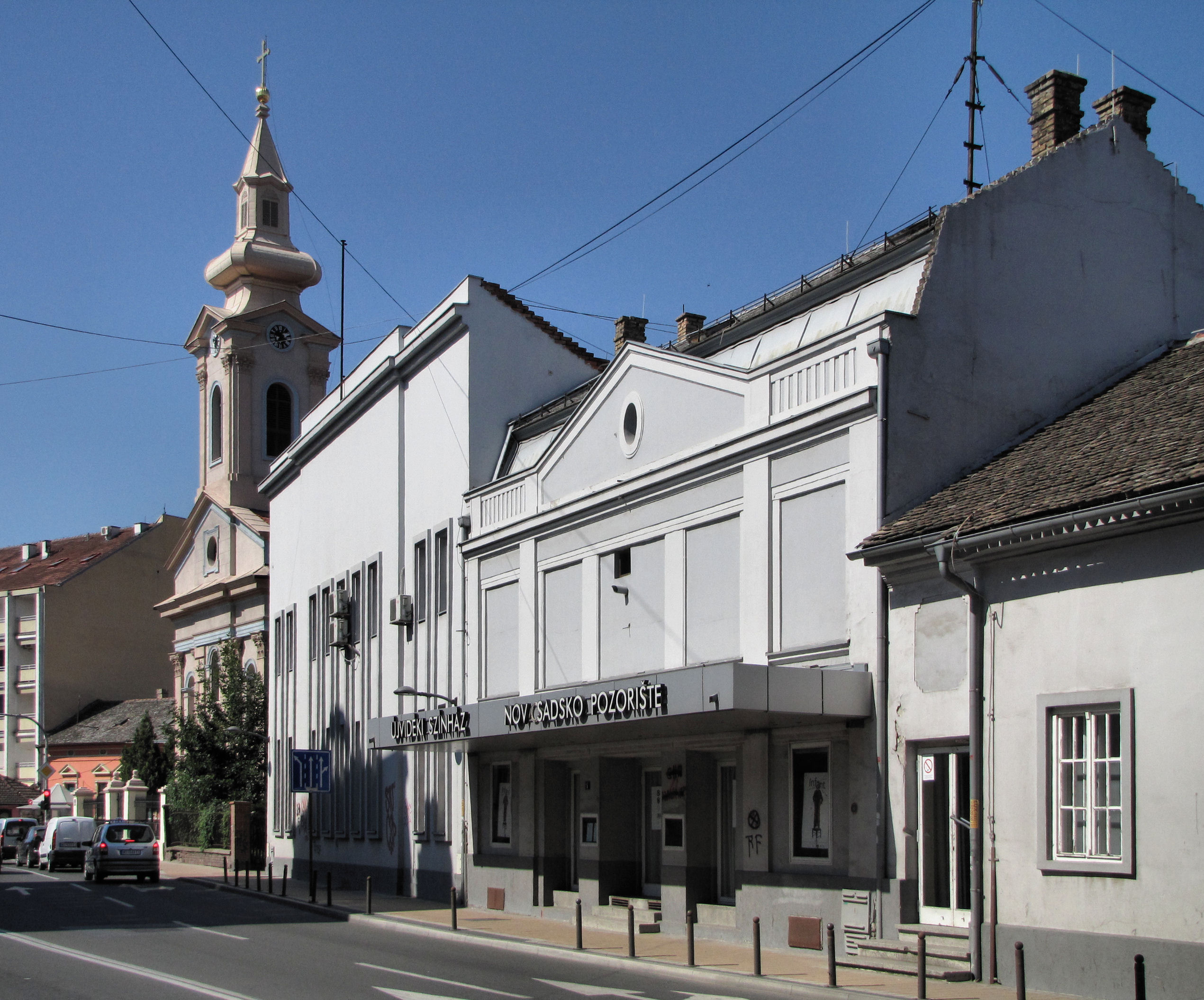
Novi Sad Theater in August 2011, prior to 2013 renovations

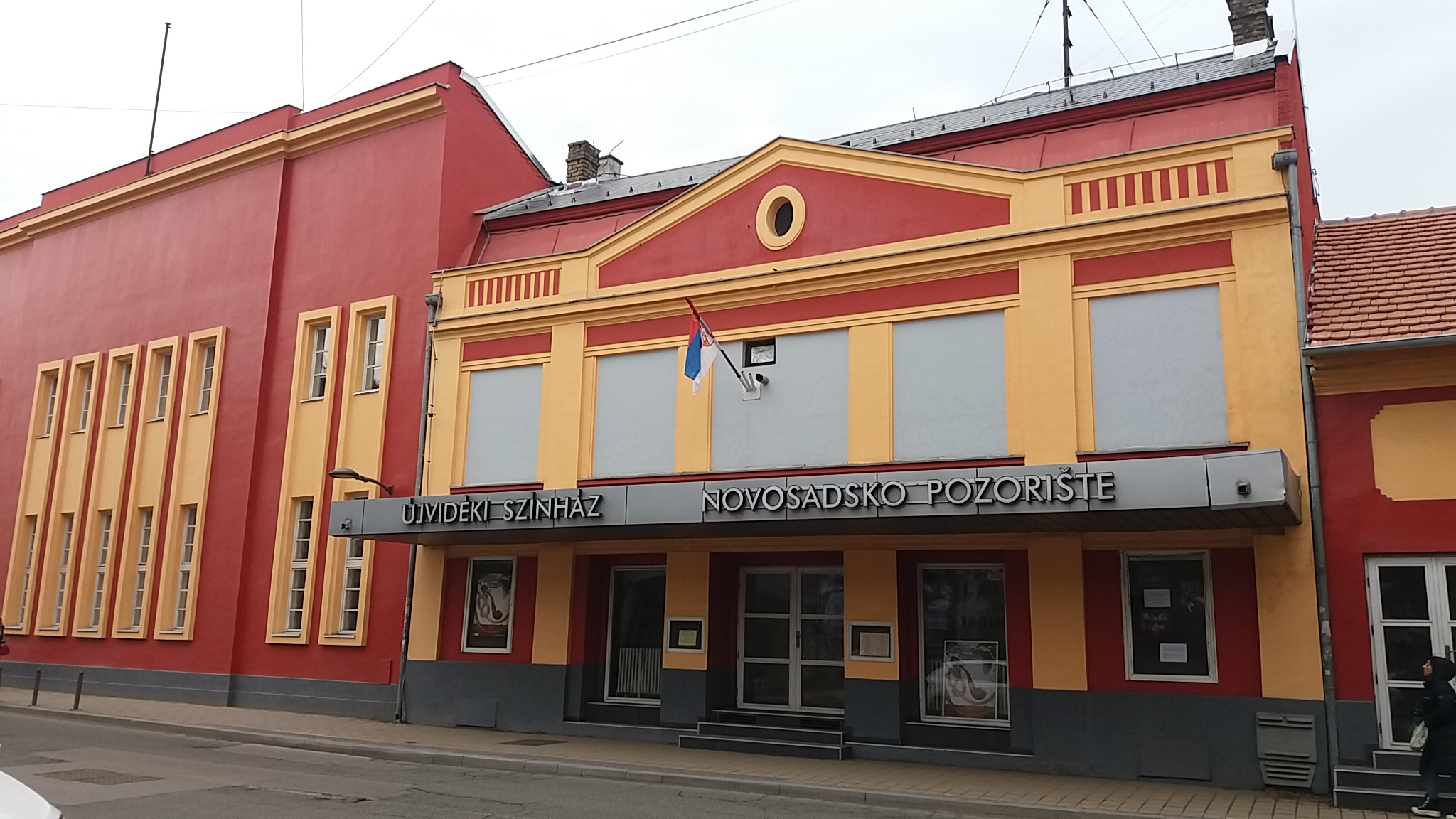
Novi Sad Theater in December 2019

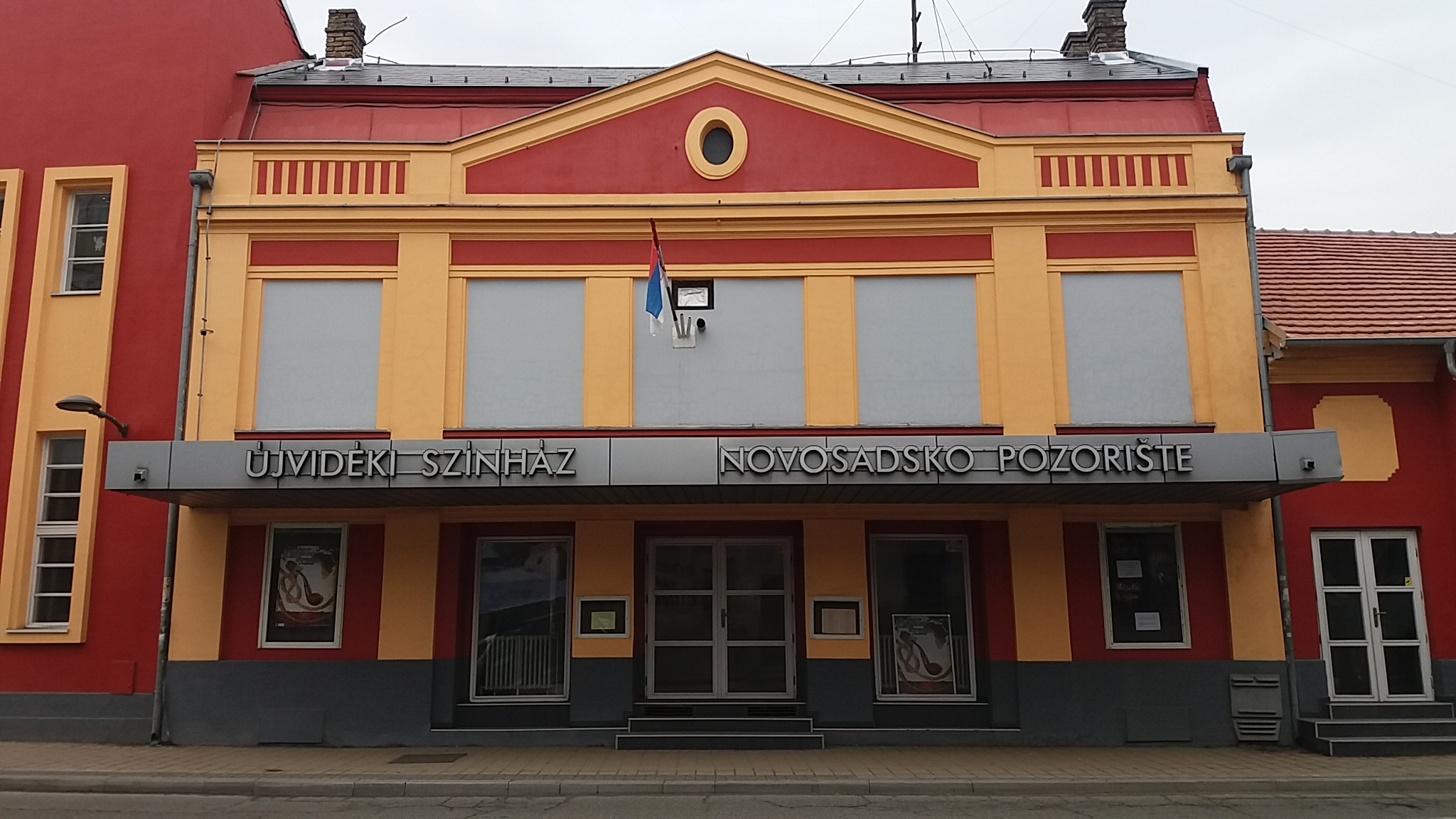
Novi Sad Theater entrance in December 2019

== See also ==
- Serbian National Theatre
- Novi Sad Youth Theatre
- List of theatres in Serbia
