= Lawrence I Aba =

Hungarian baron

Lawrence (I) Aba

Master of the stewards
- Reign: 1259–1270
- Predecessor: Mojs
- Successor: Peter Csák
- Died: between 1277 and 1279
- Buried: Klostermarienberg Abbey
- Noble family: gens Aba
- Issue: Lawrence II
- Father: Peter

Lawrence (I) from the kindred Aba (Hungarian: Aba nembeli (I.) Lőrinc; died between 1277 and 1279) was a Hungarian influential baron and soldier in the 13th century, who was considered a loyal supporter of Béla IV of Hungary. He served as Master of the stewards from 1259 to 1270.

== Family ==
Lawrence I was born into the Atyina–Gagy (or also Nyék) branch of the powerful and extended gens (clan) Aba. In genealogy, the branch was named after Atyina (present-day Voćin, Croatia), the acquisition and eponymous estate of Lawrence's grandsons. His father was a certain comes Peter, who possibly was the brother of Aba and Abraham from the clan's Széplak branch. Lawrence had three brothers: Denis (fl. 1254) was a Franciscan friar, Edőcs was referred to as a "juvenile-at-the court" in 1254, and was the progenitor of the Gagyi noble family (and thus its cadet branch, the Báthory de Gagy family). Bernard's descendants called with the surname Adácsi in the middle of the 14th century.

From his marriage to an unidentified noble lady, Lawrence I had a namesake son, Lawrence II, who served as Master of the treasury three times, in 1279, 1280–81 and 1284–85, during the reign of Ladislaus IV of Hungary. He was the ancestor of the Atyinai family, which adopted its surname in 1317 and became extinct in the 1430s.

== Béla's partisan ==
At his young age, Lawrence fought in the disastrous Battle of Mohi on 11 April 1241, where King Béla's royal army were severely defeated by the invading Mongols. According to historian Jenő Szűcs, he belonged to Béla IV's accompaniment, who fled Hungary through Transdanubia, escaping from the Mongols. The young Lawrence entered court service there and remained a member of the escort in Dalmatia, where Béla and his family took refugee in the well-fortified towns on the coast of the Adriatic Sea. Following the withdrawal of the Mongol hordes in the next year, Lawrence was commissioned to restore order in Western Transdanubia and defend the borderlands against the incursions of Duke Frederick the Quarrelsome, who previously forced Béla to cede three counties (most probably Locsmánd, Pozsony, and Sopron), taking advantage of the Hungarian monarch's desperate situation, who fled from the chasing Mongol detachments. It is plausible that Lawrence participated in the royal campaign in the second half of 1242, when Béla IV invaded Austria and forced Duke Frederick II to surrender the three counties ceded to him during the Mongol invasion. It is also possible that Lawrence was actively involved in the various military expeditions to Austria in the 1240s (for instance, Battle of the Leitha River) and 1250s, which also led to the Hungarian occupation of the Duchy of Styria in 1254. He was among those nobles, who protected the western borderland in Pozsony County after the Battle of Kressenbrunn in the summer of 1260.

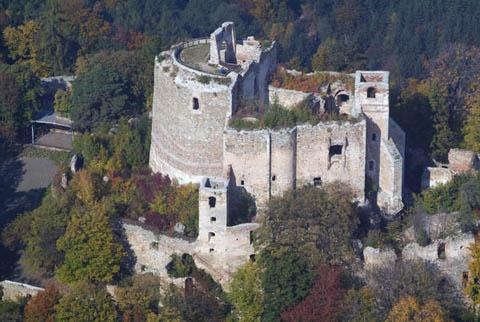
The ruins of Burgruine Landsee (Lánzsér), in present-day Austria

Lawrence Aba was created ispán of Sopron County in 1257. He served in this capacity until 1270, the death of Béla IV. Lawrence elevated into a member of the royal council, when King Béla appointed him Master of the stewards in 1259. Beside his position of ispán, he held that dignity until 1270 too. The king donated the land of Hurbuchan (Hrbljina) in Sana County in the province of Slavonia to Lawrence for his service. Since the early 1260s, tensions emerged between King Béla IV and his eldest son Stephen. When an influential lord, Conrad Győr defected to the court of Duke Stephen and allegedly swore loyalty to Hungary's archenemy, Ottokar II of Bohemia, the monarch confiscated his landholdings in Moson and Pozsony counties in 1260, and handed over a large portion of this wealth to Lawrence Aba, including Óvár Castle and the right of patronage over the Lébény monastery. However, after a brief clash between Béla and Stephen in 1262, they concluded a treaty, when divided the kingdom and Stephen received the lands to the east of the Danube. In accordance with the treaty, Conrad, among other noblemen, received amnesty from the king, who also returned the confiscated lands to him in early 1263.

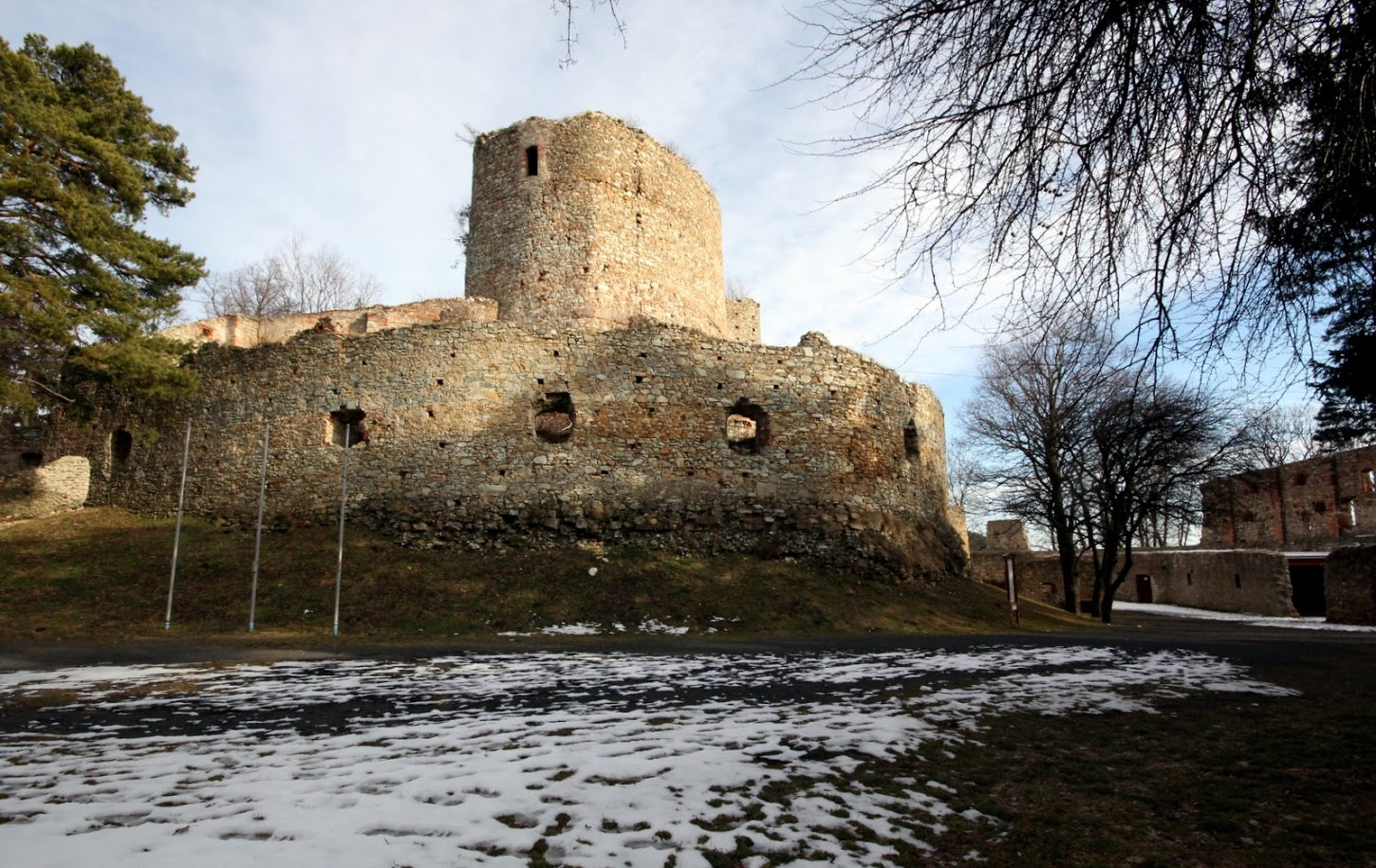
The medieval walls of Burgruine Landsee

As a compensation, Lawrence Aba was granted with a right of inheritance the whole territory of the ispánate of Locsmánd (Luchman, today Lutzmannsburg), located in Sopron County along the border with Austria, and its accessories, including the fortified castle of Lánzsér (present-day Landsee, part of Markt Sankt Martin in Austria) by Béla IV on the occasion of two royal donation letters in 1263. Formerly, the lordship of Locsmánd had belonged to Nicholas Szák, before it returned to the Crown after the death of Nicholas' son sometime before 1250. Béla's first document (exact date is unknown) also assigned the local castle folks and the royal castle warriors (with their lands), with the same privileges and services to the new landowner Lawrence. Accordingly, the castle warriors were free to leave military service but, in this case, they were obliged to leave their lands behind. However the king issued a second document on 17 December 1263, in which he excluded the lands of the local nobility and castle warriors from the donation to Lawrence. According to historian Gyula Kristó, the resistance of the local castle warriors, who refused to give up their privileges, was behind the difference between the texts of the two royal charters. Following their firm stance, Béla IV reviewed and reduced the amount of donation in his second royal charter. The borders of Lawrence's acquired lands were determined by Herbord Osl, who acted as pristaldus (royal commissioner or "bailiff") on behalf of Béla. In addition to the castle of Lánzsér, which became Lawrence's permanent seat thereafter, the villages of Lók, Nyék, Derecske, Récény, Haracsony, Dobornya and Nyujtál (Unterfrauenhaid, Neckenmarkt, Draßmarkt, Ritzing, Horitschon, Raiding and Neutal in modern-day Austria, respectively), among others, also belonged to the Locsmánd lordship. Lawrence bought a manor house in Nyék, which became his second residence, therefore his family was also called with the surname "Nyéki" in the contemporary documents.

The deteriorating relationship between King Béla and his son caused a civil war lasting until 1266. Lawrence supported Béla IV in the conflict, but did not play an active role in the subsequent military campaigns. After Stephen's victory, a new treaty confirmed the division of the country along the Danube. Lawrence Aba obtained the right of patronage of the Cistercian Klostermarienberg Abbey (Borsmonostor, today part of Mannersdorf an der Rabnitz, Austria) from Béla IV in 1268. A certain Peter, burgher of Sopron complained to the monarch in the next year that Lawrence, as ispán of the county, unlawfully usurped and retook the estate of Dag from him, despite the fact that Peter had received it as a royal privilege from Béla before that.

== Exile and return ==
Béla IV died on 3 May 1270. His daughter, Anna, Duchess of Macsó, who was a key opponent of his brother Stephen during the 1260s conflict, seized the royal treasury and fled to Bohemia. Stephen arrived to Buda for the coronation within days. He reorganized the royal council and nominated his own partisans to the highest offices; Lawrence Aba was replaced as Master of the stewards by the new monarch's faithful partisan, Peter Csák. Lawrence was also dismissed from his office of ispán of Sopron County after (at least) 13 years. He was succeeded by Palatine Mojs in this position. Soon, he also lost his right of patronage of the Klostermarienberg Abbey in favour of brothers Demetrius and Michael Rosd. Initially, Lawrence swore loyalty to the new monarch despite his fall from grace. He still stayed in Hungary even after Stephen's coronation, when a certain Thomas, one of his servants handed over a portion of Nyujtál on behalf of his lord to certain local caste warriors in exchange for their military service.

Shortly thereafter, however, events went into turmoil. The castles and estates along the Austrian border became a buffer zone due to the constant threat by Ottokar's expansionist ambitions. After his coronation, Stephen V met Ottokar II near Pressburg (present-day Bratislava, Slovakia), where they concluded a truce. After that, he resided in Vas County and attempted to reconcile his late father's old partisans, including Henry Kőszegi and Lawrence Aba, and appointed royal castellans to the border forts due to the threat of war with Bohemia. However, one of the local lords, Nicholas Hahót garrisoned Styrian soldiers in his fort at Pölöske, and made plundering raids against the nearby villages. Stephen's intention to avoid confrontation with the pro-Béla Western Transdanubian lords was thwarted by Nicholas Hahót's insurgency. Although his rebellion was crushed within days by late November, historian Attila Zsoldos argues the revolt and its suppression resulted that, instead of peaceful conciliation, several lords, who possessed lands along the border, including Henry Kőszegi, Lawrence Aba and Nicholas Geregye, followed Duchess Anna into exile to Bohemia and handed their castles to Ottokar II, who placed the treasonous nobles under his protection. The Hungarian monarch, who saw the power machinations and aspirations of Ottokar behind Hahót's revolt, launched a plundering raid into Austria around 21 December 1270. The raid escalated into war by the spring of 1271, when Ottokar invaded the lands north of the Danube in April 1271. Despite his initial successes, Stephen V won the decisive battle on 21 May. The two kings' envoys reached an agreement in Pressburg on 2 July. According to their treaty, Stephen promised that he would not assist Ottokar's opponents in Carinthia, and Ottokar renounced the castles he and his partisans held in Hungary. After the truce, Lawrence Aba fled the Bohemian court and returned to Hungary, along with Nicholas Geregye. He swore loyalty to Stephen V and recovered the castle of Lánzsér and its accessories of the king's courtesy.

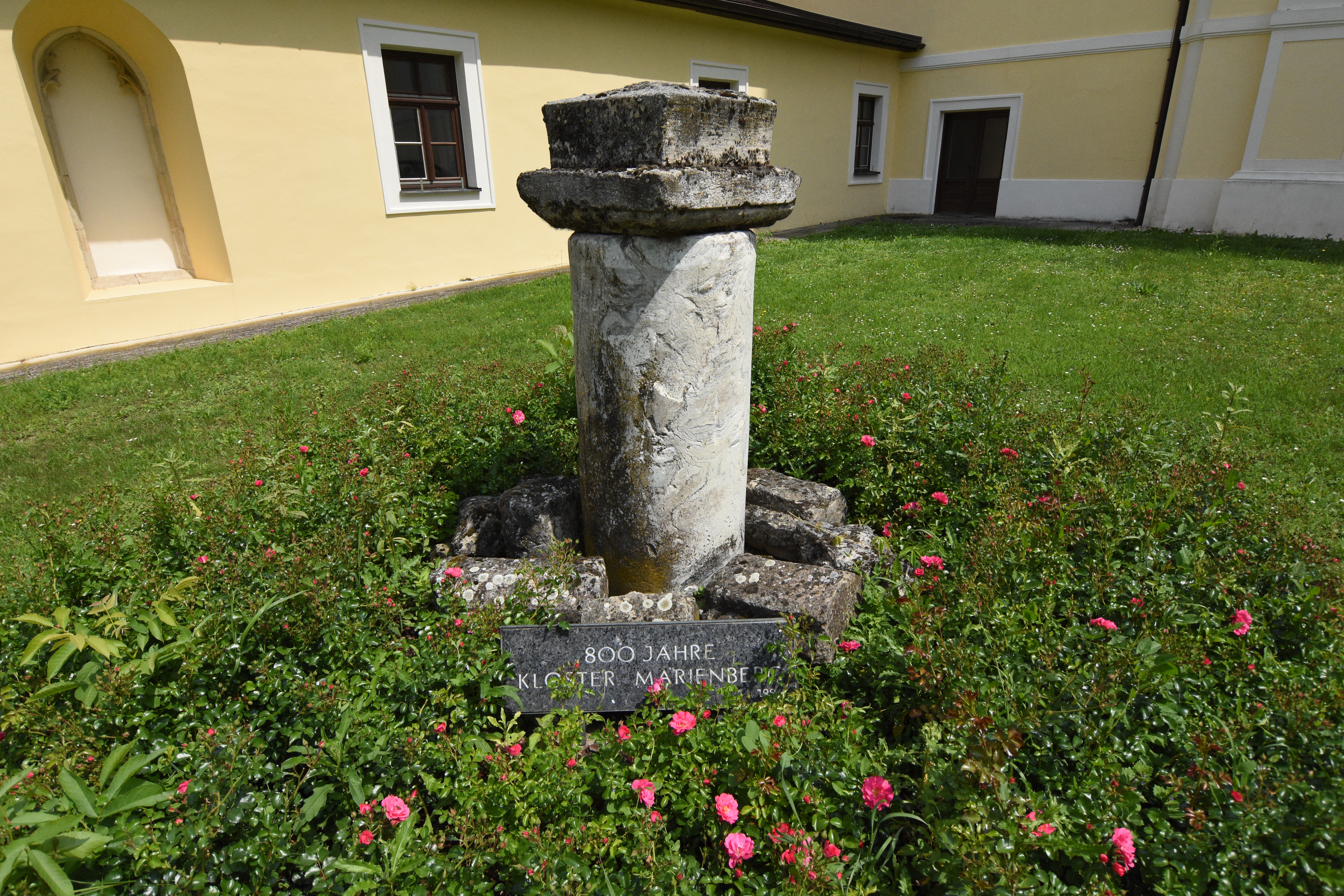
The only remaining ruin of the medieval Klostermarienberg Abbey (today in Austria)

After the death of Stephen V in August 1272, his 10-year-old son, Ladislaus IV ascended the Hungarian throne. During his minority, many groupings of barons fought against each other for supreme power and Hungary fell into anarchy. In the beginning, the alliance of Henry Kőszegi and Joachim Gutkeled dominated the royal council. Lawrence, despite their common political past and simultaneous exile in Bohemia with Henry, refused to join to their group. His lands in Sopron County were increasingly threatened by the expansionist efforts of the Kőszegi family since the 1270s, which elevated into a large-scale contiguous and coherent territorial province in Western Transdanubia. Therefore, Lawrence allied with the Kőszegis' rival, the gens (clan) Csák. However Lawrence did not play a significant role in the struggles and after his return from Bohemia, never held any dignities nor positions again. After a decrease in their influence, Joachim Gutkeled and Henry Kőszegi captured Ladislaus IV and his mother near Buda at the end of June 1274. They restored the homogeneous government thereafter, while the young monarch and Queen Elizabeth were practically held under house arrest. Although Peter Csák liberated the king and his mother in a short time, the two powerful lords captured Ladislaus' younger brother, Andrew, and took him to Slavonia, the centre of their political basis. During their journey to the southern province, the royal army led by Peter Csák and Lawrence Aba chased and caught them still in Transdanubia. The pro-Ladislaus troops defeated their united forces in the Battle of Föveny in September 1274. Henry Kőszegi was killed in the battlefield, while Joachim Gutkeled managed to survive.

Following the battle, Ladislaus IV returned the land of Szentmihály in Vas County to Lawrence Aba, which was "once owned by Lawrence, but later it was unlawfully seized from him" (plausibly by Henry Kőszegi and his sons). The king also confiscated some of Joachim Gutkeled's lands outside Slavonia, including Málca in Zemplén County (present-day Malčice, Slovakia), which was given to Lawrence Aba. In addition, Lawrence was re-installed as patron of the Klostermarienberg Abbey too in 1275. However, two years later, he lost it again, in accordance with the then state of power rivalry (the beneficiaries were again the Rosd brothers). Meanwhile, he continued to expand his influence over the territory of the former Locsmánd ispánate. According to a document, issued in January 1277, Lawrence usurped the castle of Ieva sometime earlier from local nobles, Beze and Lawrence. Their father, Stephen was formerly referred to as the king's official in the region. Thereafter, Lawrence Aba returned the fort to its original owners on the condition that the castle and its accessories could be sold or exchanged exclusively for him. Gyula Kristó considered Lawrence had attempted to establish a local territorial domain independently of the royal power with that step, similarly to the Csáks and the Kőszegis, although to a lesser extent. Lawrence Aba died sometime between 1277 and 1279. He was buried in the Klostermarienberg Abbey. His namesake son donated the estate of Limpach to the abbey for his late father's spiritual salvation in 1279. In the upcoming decade, the Kőszegi family seized whole Sopron County (including the Locsmánd region), and Lawrence II became one of their familiares.

== Sources ==
- C. Tóth, Norbert (2001). "A Győr-nemzetség az Árpád-korban [The Győr Kindred in the Age of Árpáds]". In Neumann, Tibor (ed.). Analecta Mediaevalia I. Tanulmányok a középkorról (in Hungarian). Argumentum Kiadó. p. 53–72. ISBN 963-446-174-3.
- Kristó, Gyula (1969). "A locsmándi várispánság és felbomlása [The Royal Castle Ispánate of Locsmánd and its Dissolution]". Soproni Szemle (in Hungarian). 23 (2). Soproni Városszépítő Egyesület: 131–144. ISSN 0133-0748.
- Rudolf, Veronika (2023). Közép-Európa a hosszú 13. században [Central Europe in the Long 13th Century] (in Hungarian). Arpadiana XV., Research Centre for the Humanities. ISBN 978-963-416-406-7.
- Szűcs, Jenő (2002). Az utolsó Árpádok [The Last Árpáds] (in Hungarian). Osiris Kiadó. ISBN 963-389-271-6.
- Zsoldos, Attila (2007). Családi ügy: IV. Béla és István ifjabb király viszálya az 1260-as években [A family affair: The Conflict between Béla IV and Junior King Stephen in the 1260s] (in Hungarian). História, MTA Történettudományi Intézete. ISBN 978-963-9627-15-4.
- Zsoldos, Attila (2011). Magyarország világi archontológiája, 1000–1301 [Secular Archontology of Hungary, 1000–1301] (in Hungarian). História, MTA Történettudományi Intézete. ISBN 978-963-9627-38-3.

Lawrence I Genus Aba Born: ? Died: 1277/79
Political offices
Preceded by Mojs	Master of the stewards 1259–1270	Succeeded by Peter Csák
