= Sopron–Kőszeg railway =

Railway line in Austria and Hungary

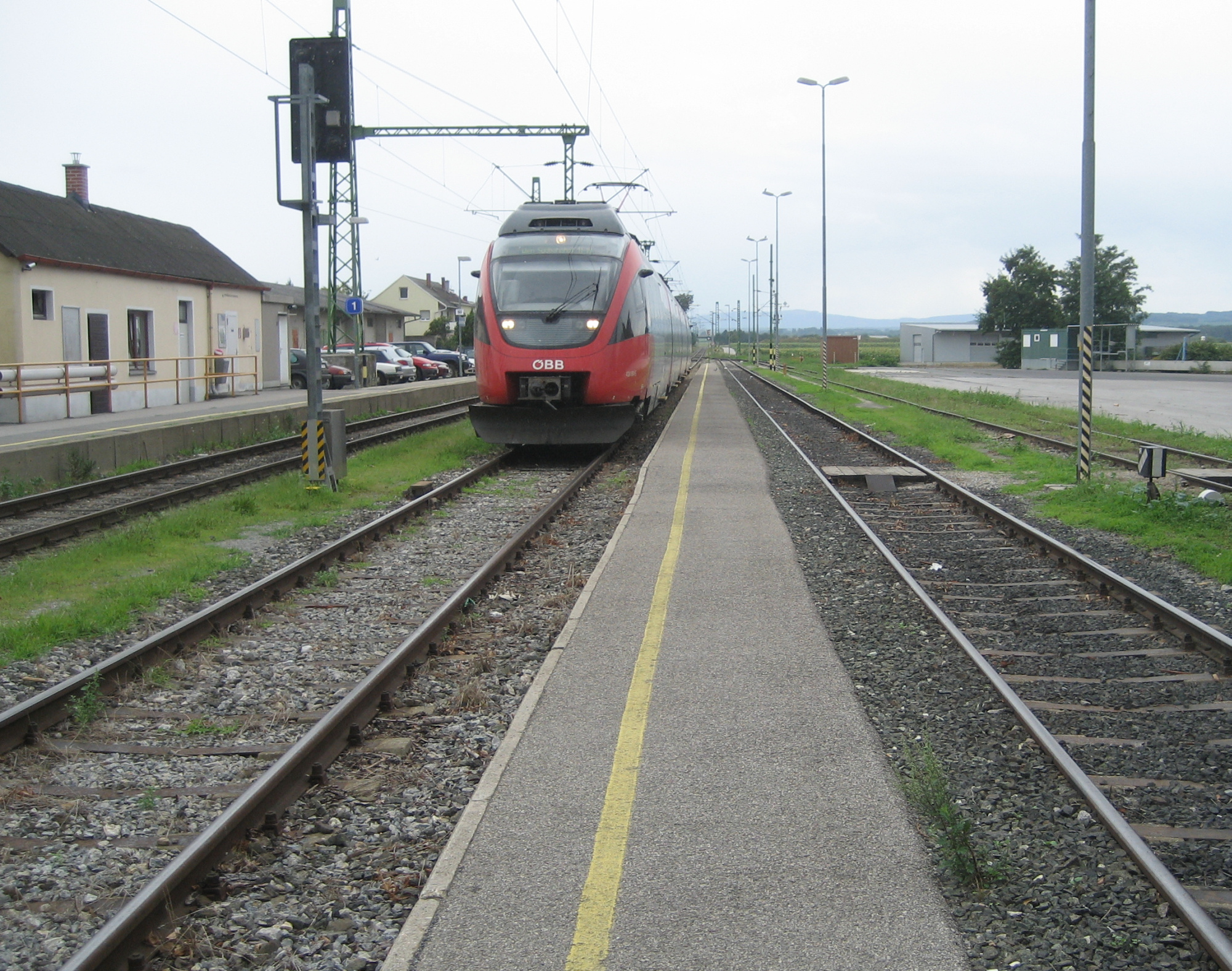

Overview
- Owner: ÖBB

Technical
- Line length: 57.7 km (35.9 mi)
- Track gauge: 1,435 mm (4 ft 8 1/2 in) standard gauge
- Operating speed: 80 km/h (50 mph)

The Sopron–Kőszeg railway line, also known as Burgenlandbahn and Günser Bahn, is a railway line formerly connecting Sopron and Kőszeg, two towns in western Hungary, through the Austrian province Burgenland. It is a single-track partly electrified line, operated by ÖBB (passenger trains) and GySEV (goods trains). Its only connection to the rest of the ÖBB network currently is through Sopron.

Operations on most of the track (between Deutschkreutz and Kőszeg) have been ceased in a few stages. As the Iron Curtain has cut off Hungary from Austria, passenger traffic between Rattersdorf-Liebing and Kőszeg had to be stopped on 6 October 1951, with goods trains no longer operating since 1 September 1960 on, with only corridor traffic being allowed. The track from Oberloisdorf in the direction of Hungary has been dismantled on 28 April 1969. All traffic between Deutschkreutz and Oberloisdorf stopped on 15 December 2013.

== Gallery ==
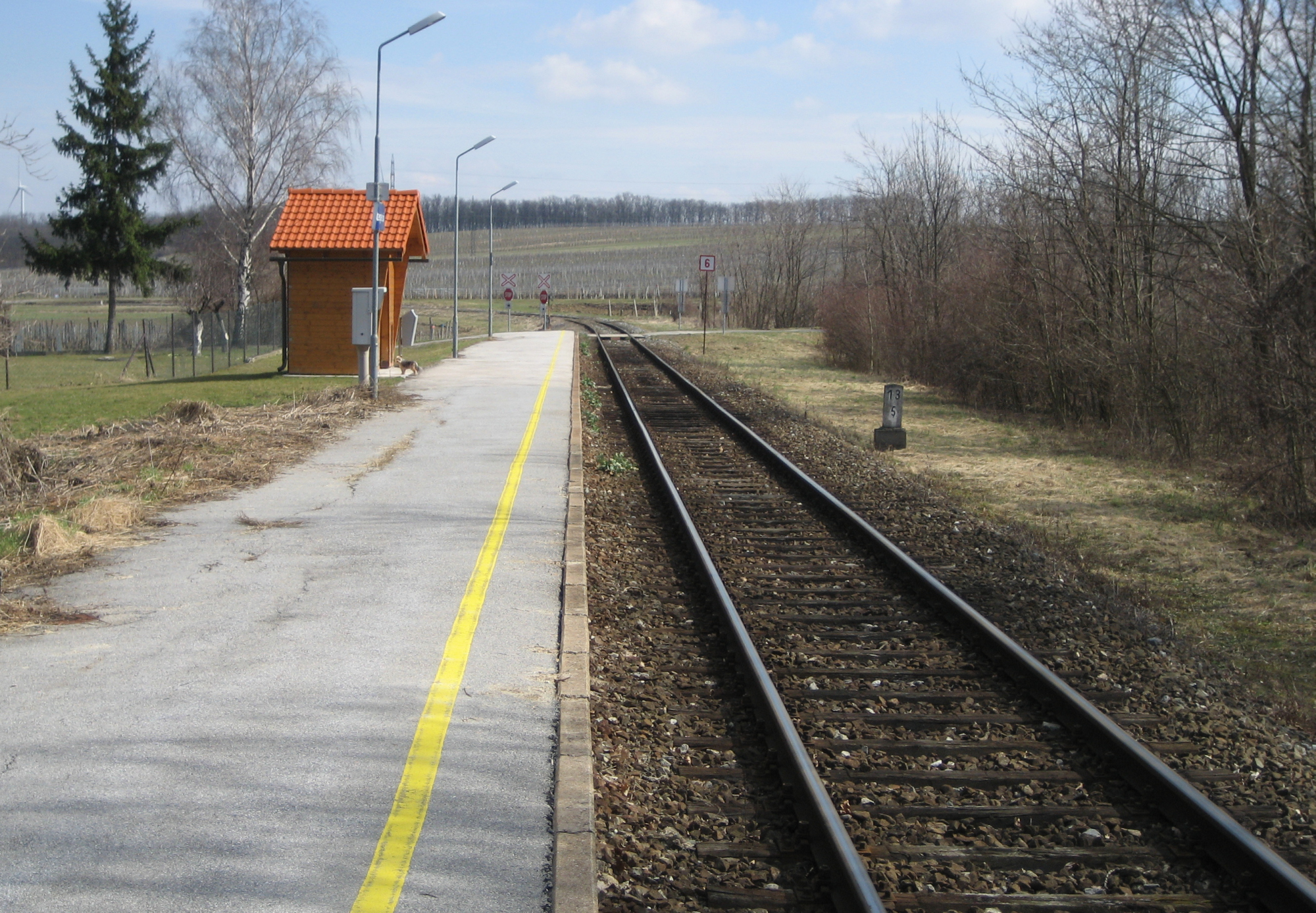
Unterpetersdorf station

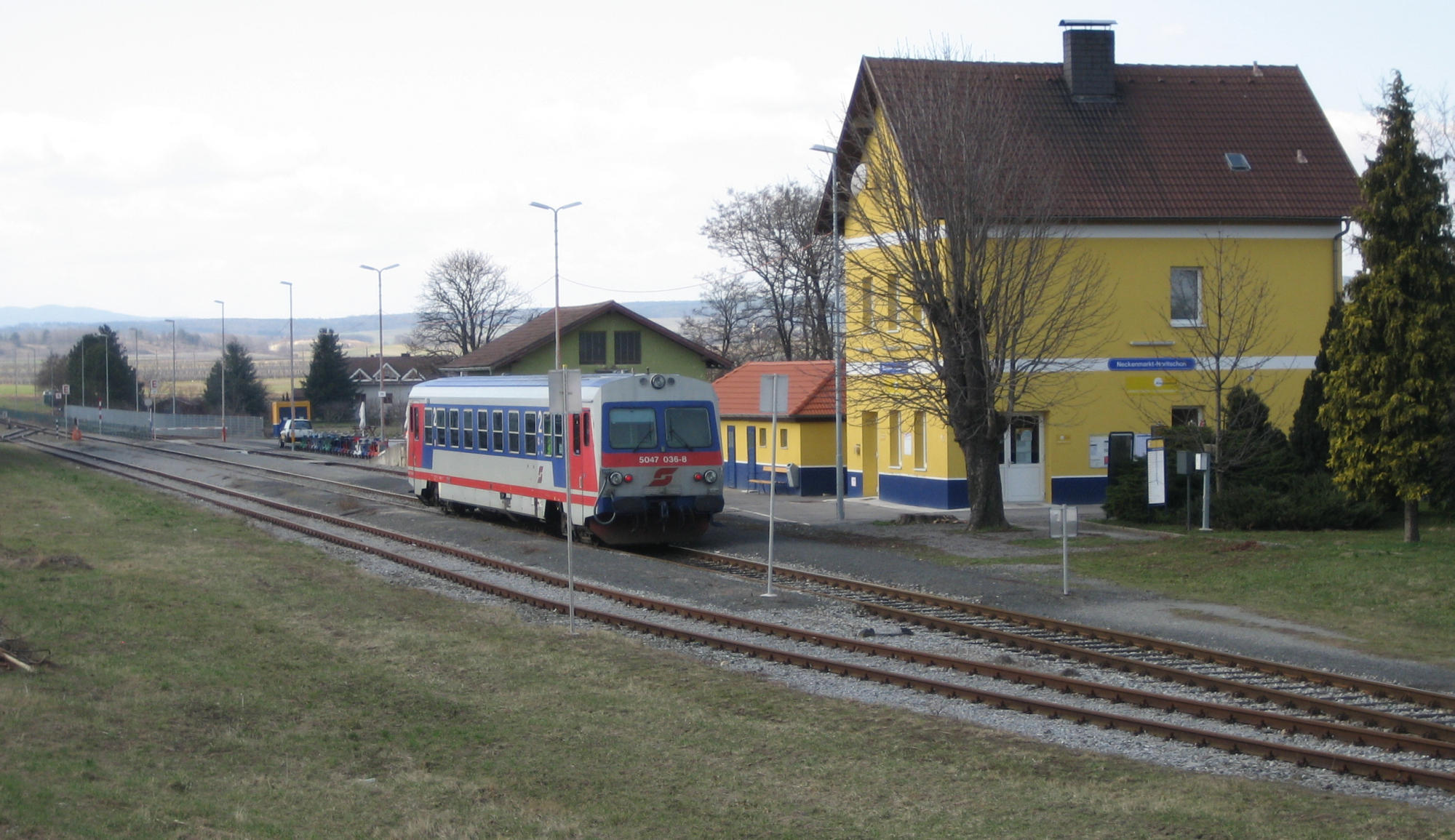
Neckenmarkt-Horitschon station

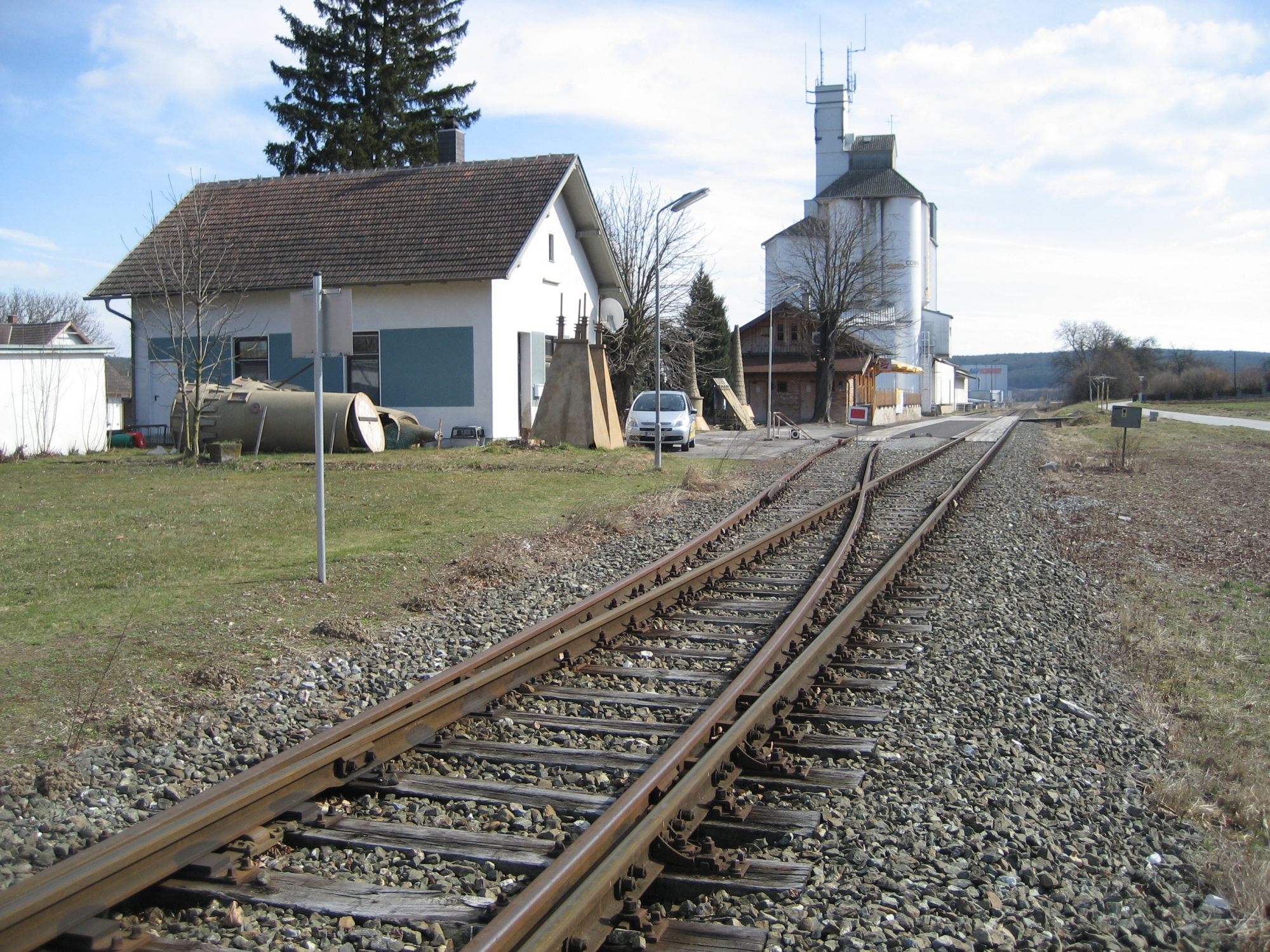
Stoob station

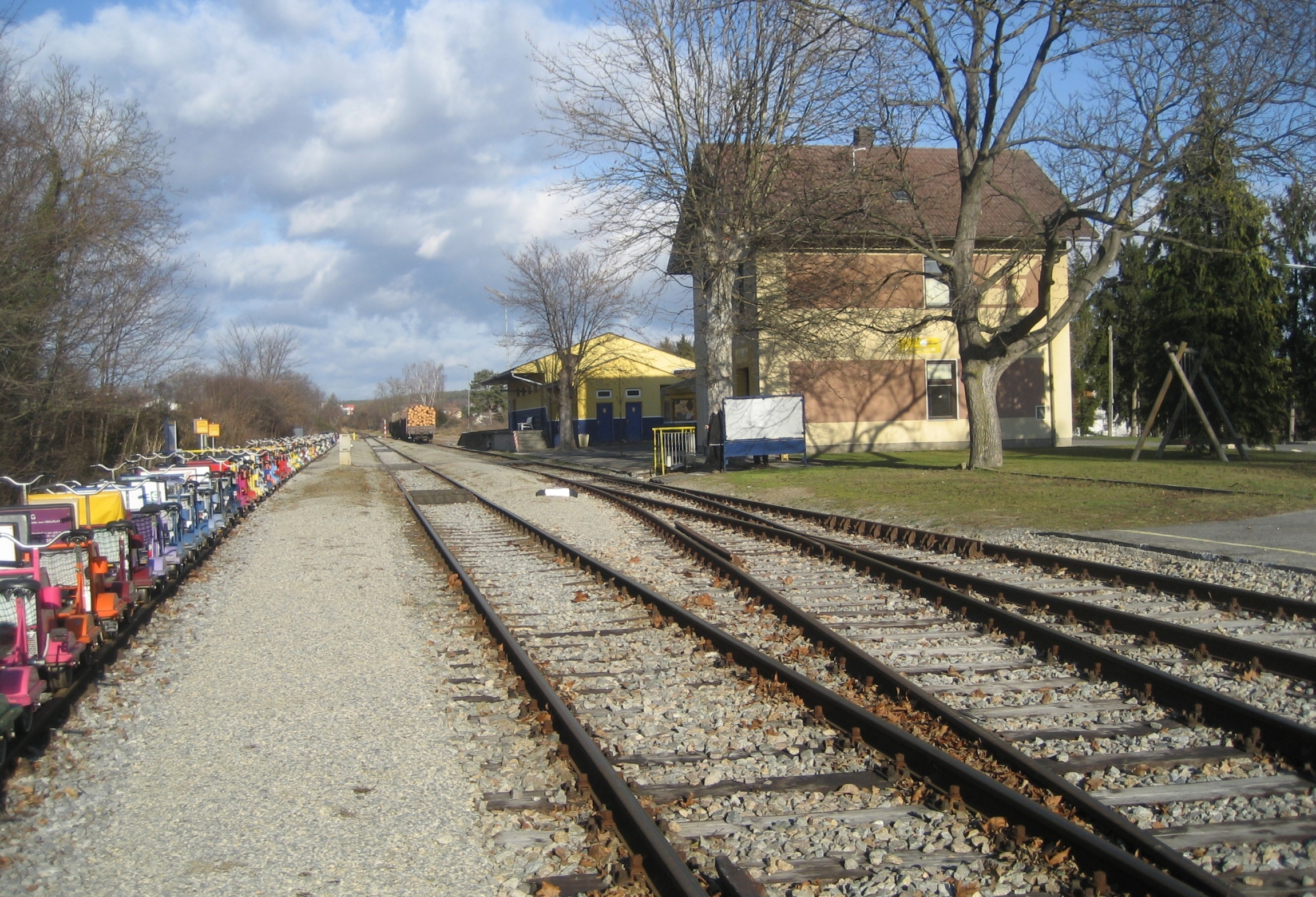
Oberpullendorf station

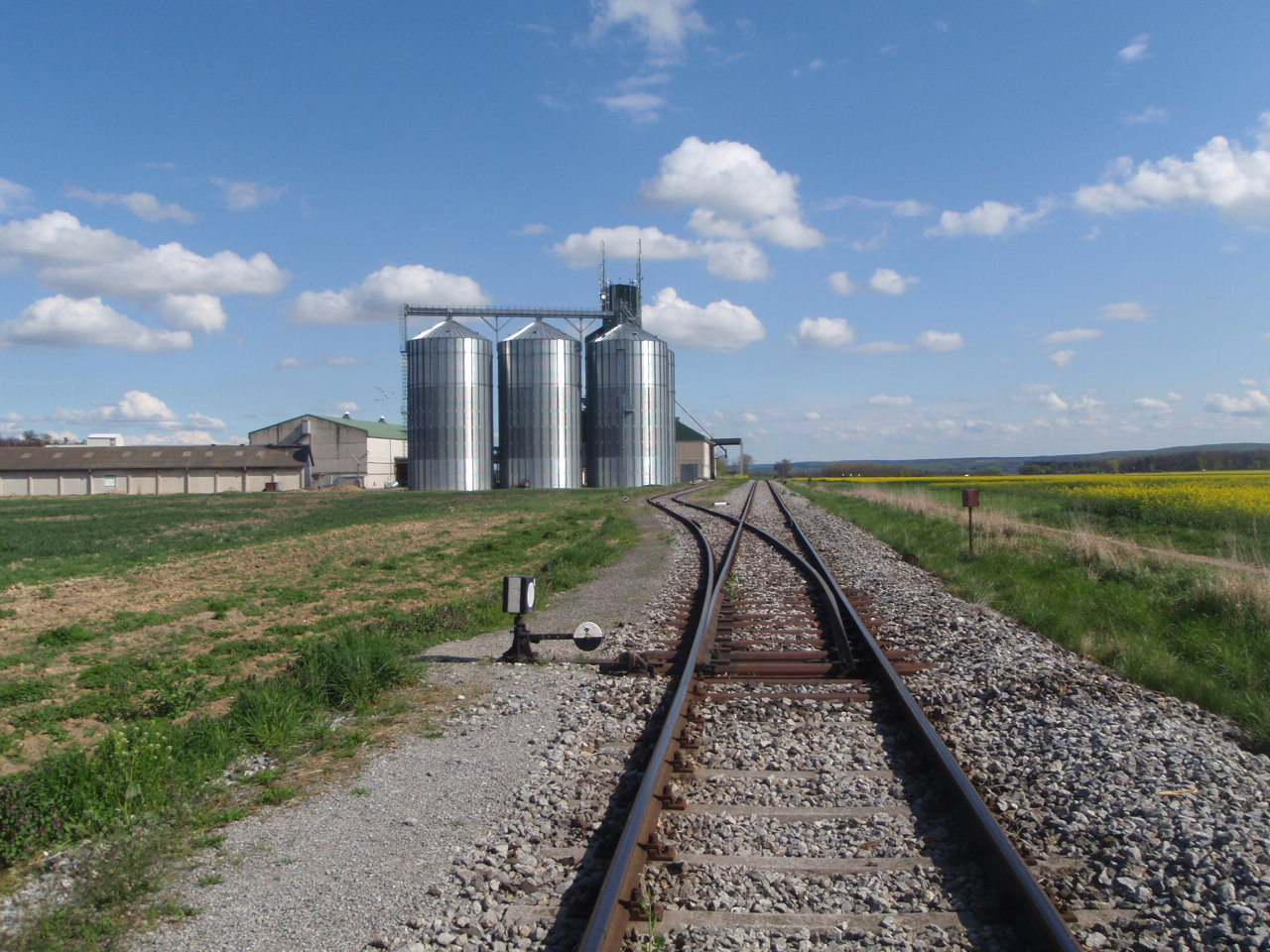
Former Unterpullendorf station

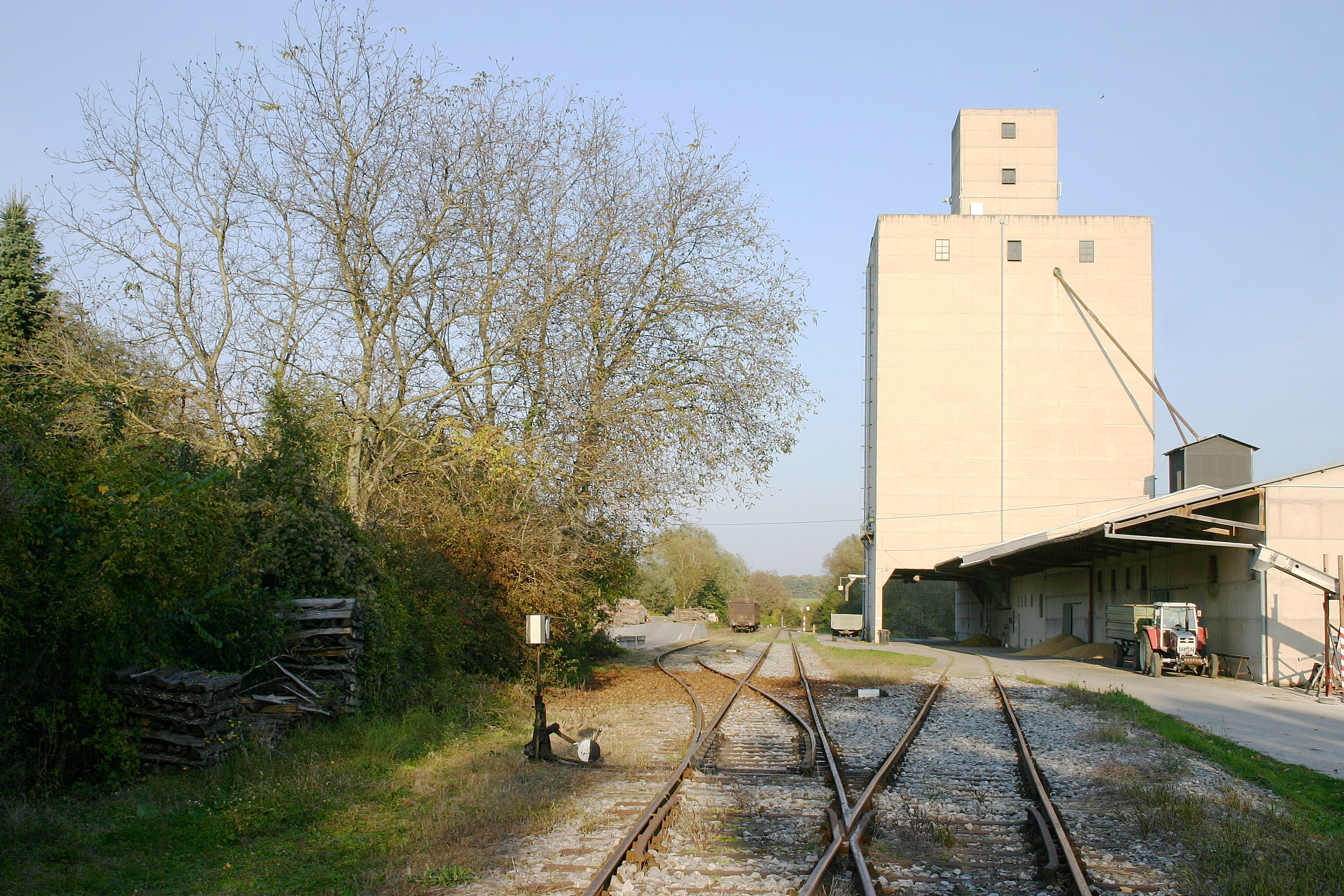
Oberloisdorf station

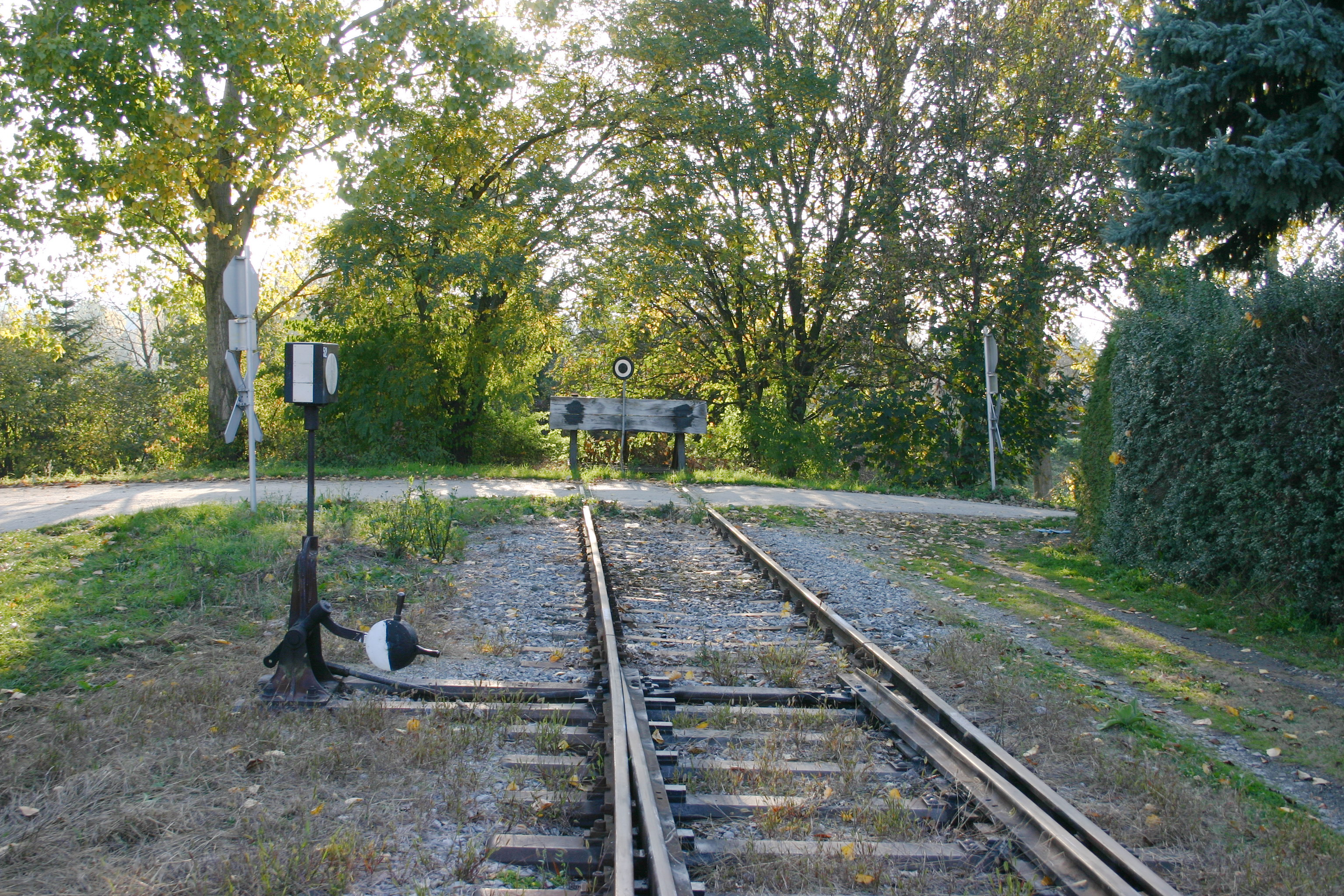
End of the track in Oberloisdorf
