= Rattersdorf =

Rattersdorf Rőtfalva, Ratištrof
- Village
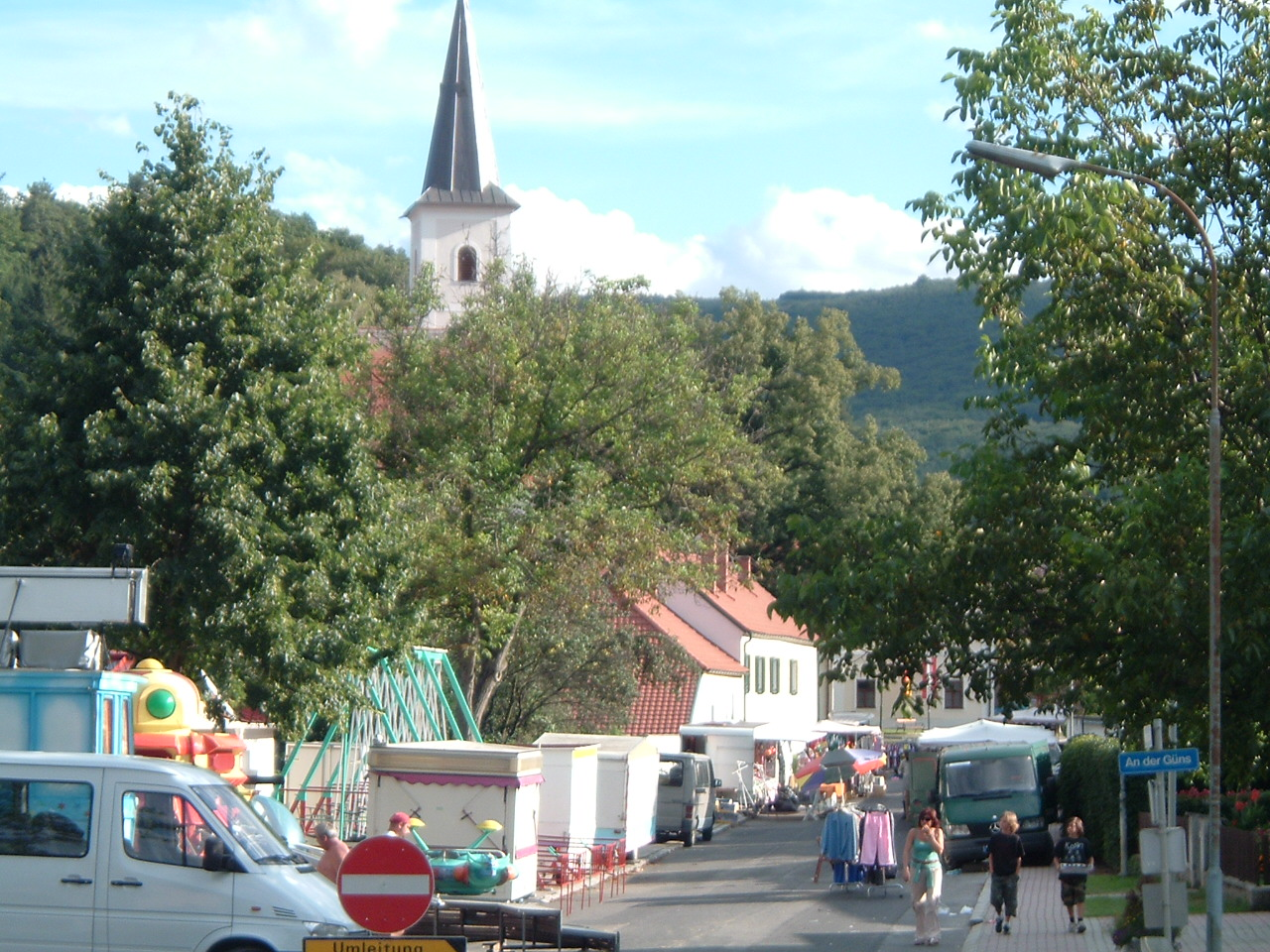
- Fairgrounds in Rattersdorf

- Location within Burgenland Location within Austria
- Coordinates: 47°24′0″N 16°30′0″E
- Country: Austria
- State (Land): Burgenland
- District (Bezirk): Oberpullendorf
- Settled: Prior to 1279

Area
  - Total: 4.0701 km^{2} (1.5715 sq mi)
- Elevation: 459 m (1,506 ft)

Population (Census 2001)
  - Total: 466
  - Density: 114.5/km^{2} (297/sq mi)
- Time zone: UTC+1 (CET)
  - Summer (DST): UTC+2 (CEST)
- Postcode: 7443 Rattersdorf
- Area code: +43 (0) 2611
- Website: www.mannersdorf-adr.at

Rattersdorf (Hungarian: Rőtfalva, Serbo-Croatian: Ratištrof) is an Austrian hamlet about 90 km south of Vienna, with a population of under 500. It is in the municipality of Mannersdorf an der Rabnitz, Oberpullendorf district, Burgenland state. Until 1899 the village was officially known by the more abbreviated name of Rőt.

== Location ==
Rattersdorf is one kilometre south of Liebing, off Austrian Highway 55 (Kirchschlager-Bundesstraße). For its last six kilometres before the junction with Hwy. 61 (which extends into Hungary as Hwy. 87), Hwy. 55 closely follows the Austro-Hungarian border north of the Kőszegi Nature Protection Zone, near the Hungarian village of Kőszeg. Rattersdorf forms a part of the Kőszeg Lutheran parish and is the seat of the Rattersdorf Catholic parish; civil records are maintained in Lockenhaus.

Rattersdorf offers direct access to the nature park at the Geschriebenstein (Írott-kő); since Hungary joined the Schengen Agreement in 2007, no border controls have been in place. The village is also conveniently linked to Austria's well-developed system of hiking trails and mostly asphalted cycling paths. Lutzmannsburg is 15 km away, and the Austrian wine country of Mittelburgenland, famous for Blaufränkisch grapes, is 25 km away.

== History ==
=== Medieval times ===
The first documented reference to the village, in the form Reuth, dates to 1279, when it was recorded as a possession of "Mons. de Reuth", who had acquired the estate from the feudal seigneury of Lockenhaus (still the name of a nearby town of about 2,000 people). By 1390, the village was in the possession of the Kanizsay family.

In 1532 an Ottoman army besieged the area, abducting or killing most of the population of Liebing and Rattersdorf and destroying both villages.

By 1676, near the apogee of Ottoman power in Europe, the lands of Galántha (now in Slovakia) included Lockenhaus and Rattersdorf and were owned by the Esterházy family, descending from Ferenc Zerházy (1563–1594), first baron of Galántha.

=== Austro-Hungarian boundary ===
Rattersdorf's population at the 1910 census of Austria-Hungary was predominantly German-speaking; indeed, the four villages of Liebing, Rattersdorf, Hammerteich and Lockenhaus had a combined population of 2,381 German speakers but only 124 identifying themselves as ethnic Hungarians. After World War I the Treaty of Saint-Germain-en-Laye (1919) provisionally assigned the German-speaking Burgenland to Austria but did not settle the exact Austro-Hungarian border. Pursuant to the 1920 Treaty of Trianon, the four villages initially became a part of the Kőszeg subdivision of the Vas administrative district in the Kingdom of Hungary, and a neutral boundary determination commission was created to delineate the frontier.

The new countries (Austria and Hungary) made overlapping territorial claims. The Hungarian delegation pointed out that the four villages had long-established trading ties with the Hungarian town of Kőszeg (known in German as Güns), whilst Austria, with its greatly reduced territory, population and resources, would face considerable difficulties in adequately providing the area with food and other supplies. An important factor behind the Hungarian position was Prince Pál Miklós Victor Esterházy's vast land holdings, which included much of the area in and around Lockenhaus and which he wished to remain within Hungary's territorial boundary; the Hungarian government saw that their best interest lay in supporting his claim. As it happened, although a short-lived communist government took power in 1919 under Béla Kun, it failed to redistribute large Hungarian estates, such as those of Esterházy, to the peasantry and became embroiled in war with both Romania and Czechoslovakia.

As regards the economic relations of Kőszeg to its substantial hinterland, Austria argued that the area, considered as a single economic entity, had more connections with Austria than with Hungary and that rather than attaching the four villages to Hungary, Kőszeg should instead form a part of Austrian Burgenland. Furthermore, if the counterclaim were not accepted, Esterházy need not fear economic difficulties resulting from the alienation of his lands; Austria would willingly compensate him by allowing Austrian timber harvested from his lands to be milled in Hungary.

Austria explained to the boundary determination commission its belief that the loss of Lockenhaus, Hammerteich, Liebing and Rattersdorf would thwart the then proposed expansion of the Kirchschlag-Deutschkreutz railway line to Liebing and also the expansion of a line to Oberschützen-Hartberg. Cutting off access to the hinterland would also undermine the viability of the Deutschkreutz-Mannersdorf railway line.

Austrians also feared losing Lockenhaus to Hungary, believing that local boundary changes would lead to the loss of the glassworks in Glashütten (known in Hungarian as Szalónakhuta), which manufactured a beautiful yellow glass through the admixture of sulphur. In an April 1922 report the Austrian Ministry of Trade and Industry had declared the glassworks essential to Austrian commerce. The dispute was referred to the League of Nations Council in Geneva, which decided on 19 September 1922 that the mostly German-speaking communities of Lockenhaus and Hammerteich — as well as of Luising in the district of Güssing, some 35 km south of Rattersdorf and also claimed by Hungary — would be assigned to Austria, whilst Rattersdorf and Liebing, despite the wish of German-speaking majorities as expressed in a 1921 plebiscite, should be assigned to Hungary.

Austria was unhappy with the decision on the status of Rattersdorf and Liebing. The Burgenland state government now proposed an exchange in which these two communities would be joined to Austria, while Austria would transfer its villages of Bleigraben and Prostrum to Hungary, a solution supported by most people in the latter two villages, who were largely Croatian-speaking.

At a meeting in Ödenburg (now known by its Hungarian name Sopron) on 22 November 1922 the two countries reached consensus on the proposed swap, and the Paris Conférence des Ambassadeurs ratified the border settlement on 27 January 1923. In March 1923 the border was redrawn, and the Hungarian dictator Miklós Horthy ceded Liebing (then known by its Hungarian name Rendek) and Rattersdorf (Rőtfalva) to Austria, making these the youngest villages within Austrian Burgenland. At the same time the former Austrian hamlets of Bleigraben (now Ólmod) and Prostrum (now Szentpéterfa) were transferred to Hungary. After both sides accepted an accurate map detailing the line of demarcation, the neutral boundary determination commission was dissolved at its last meeting in Sopron on 2 August 1924.

=== Nazi occupation of Austria ===
From the time of the Austrian Anschluss of 1938 until the end of World War II in 1945, Rattersdorf, as with the rest of Austria, was incorporated within Nazi Germany.

== Buildings ==
In Rattersdorf, built on Roman foundations, is a Catholic church in Gothic style, the oldest church in Burgenland. Erected beside a sacred spring in 1207, it was expanded with Renaissance elements in the 14th and 15th centuries. After its destruction by an Ottoman army in 1532, Prince Pál Esterházy reconstructed it in Baroque style in 1696. During World War II the church was commandeered for use as a munitions bunker, and the building was subsequently renovated in 1964.

Rattersdorf has a Gasthaus, a small ADEG supermarket and a Volksschule, which offers kindergarten plus the first four years of primary education.

== Climate ==
The annual total precipitation is about 820 mm (32 inches).

Climate data for Rattersdorf-Liebing, Austria (2004–2008)
Month	Jan	Feb	Mar	Apr	May	Jun	Jul	Aug	Sep	Oct	Nov	Dec	Year
Mean daily maximum °C (°F)	4.5 (40.1)	6.9 (44.4)	10.9 (51.6)	17.6 (63.7)	21.9 (71.4)	25.5 (77.9)	27.4 (81.3)	25.1 (77.2)	21.6 (70.9)	16.8 (62.2)	9.7 (49.5)	3.7 (38.7)	16.0 (60.7)
Mean daily minimum °C (°F)	−4.5 (23.9)	−3.2 (26.2)	−0.6 (30.9)	5.0 (41.0)	9.4 (48.9)	13.6 (56.5)	15.1 (59.2)	13.7 (56.7)	10.2 (50.4)	6.3 (43.3)	1.6 (34.9)	−3.0 (26.6)	5.3 (41.5)
Average precipitation mm (inches)	18.3 (0.72)	25.9 (1.02)	46.4 (1.83)	52.8 (2.08)	81.0 (3.19)	129.3 (5.09)	110.0 (4.33)	142.4 (5.61)	80.7 (3.18)	50.4 (1.98)	38.4 (1.51)	43.1 (1.70)	818.7 (32.24)
Source: TuTiempo.net

== Clubs and associations ==
Local sport associations include the soccer club SC Rattersdorf-Liebing, affiliated since its founding in 1967 with the Burgenländischer Fußballverband and the Austrian Sports Federation (ASVÖ) and the Burschenschaft Rattersdorf-Liebing tennis club, affiliated with the Austrian Sport and Physical Culture Union (ASKÖ).

The "Musikverein Grenzland", also founded in 1967, is a group of 40 musicians led by Concertmaster Helmut Draskovits.

Rattersdorf has a volunteer fire department (Freiwillige Feuerwehr Rattersdorf) which is led by Commander Florian Paul.
