= Großwarasdorf =

Großwarasdorf Veliki Borištof
- Municipality
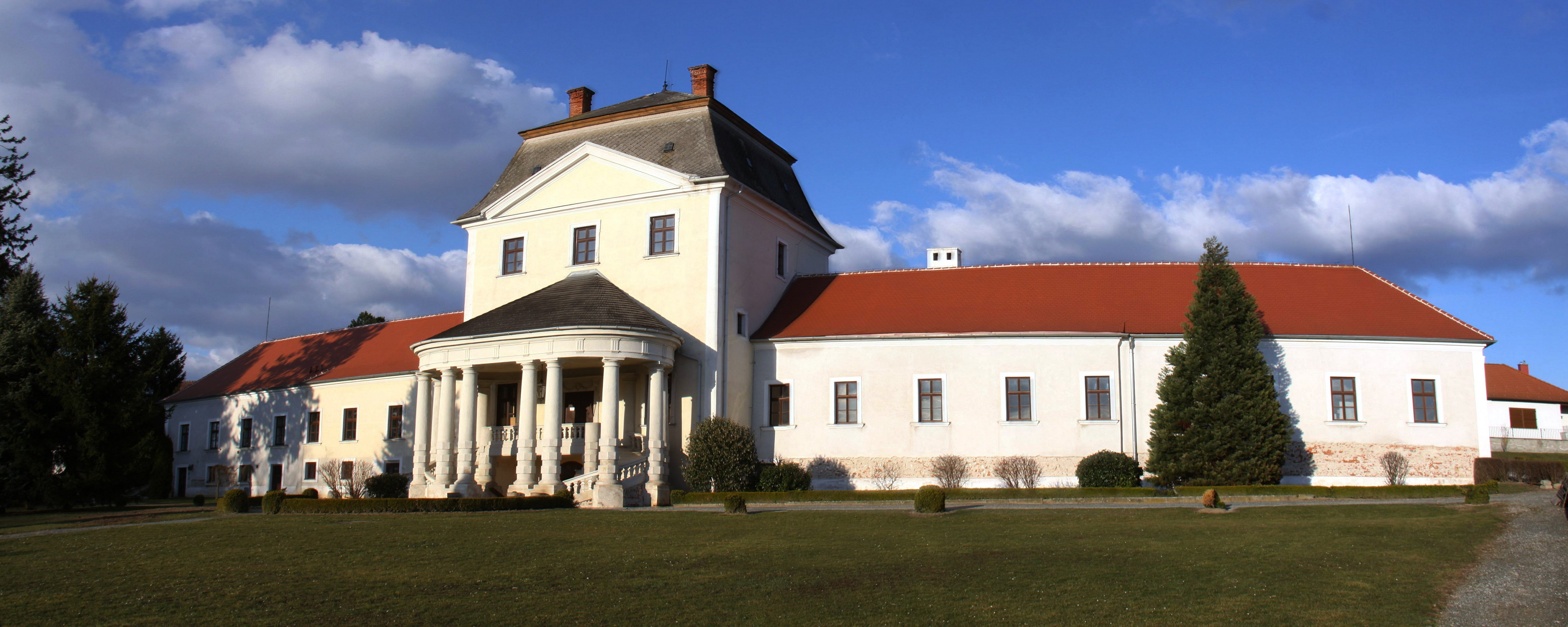
- Nebersdorf Castle

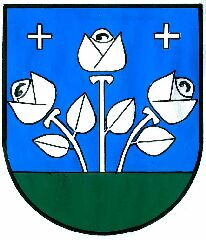
- Coat of arms

- Location within Austria
- Coordinates: 47°27′N 16°36′E
- Country: Austria
- State: Burgenland
- District: Oberpullendorf

Government
  - Mayor: Rudolf Berlakovich (ÖVP)

Area
  - Total: 42.49 km^{2} (16.41 sq mi)
- Elevation: 244 m (801 ft)

Population (2018-01-01)
  - Total: 1,381
  - Density: 32.50/km^{2} (84.18/sq mi)
- Time zone: UTC+1 (CET)
  - Summer (DST): UTC+2 (CEST)
- Postal code: 7304
- Website: www.grosswarasdorf.at

Großwarasdorf (until 1894 Baromlak, between 1894 and 1920 Hungarian: Szabadbáránd, Croatian: Veliki Borištof) is a town in the district of Oberpullendorf in the state of Burgenland in eastern Austria.

== Population ==
Historical population
Year	Pop.	±%
1869	3,013	—
1880	3,526	+17.0%
1890	3,536	+0.3%
1900	3,628	+2.6%
1910	3,725	+2.7%
1923	3,936	+5.7%
1934	3,841	−2.4%
1939	3,336	−13.1%
1951	3,225	−3.3%
1961	2,604	−19.3%
1971	2,212	−15.1%
1981	1,940	−12.3%
1991	1,754	−9.6%
2001	1,647	−6.1%
2011	1,467	−10.9%
2017	1,414	−3.6%
