= The Unprecedented Defence of the Fortress Deutschkreuz =

- Directed by: Werner Herzog
- Written by: Werner Herzog
- Produced by: Werner Herzog
- Cinematography: Jaime Pacheco
- Edited by: Werner Herzog
- Release date: 5 April 1967
- Running time: 15 minutes
- Country: West Germany
- Language: German

The Unprecedented Defence of the Fortress Deutschkreuz (German: Die Beispiellose Verteidigung der Festung Deutschkreutz) is a 1967 short film by Werner Herzog filmed in 1966 in Deutschkreutz, Austria. Herzog's official website describes the film as "a satire on the state of war and peace and the absurdities it inspires."

== Plot ==
In the film, four men break into an abandoned castle that was the site of a battle between the Russians and Germans during World War II. The men find old military uniforms and equipment, and equip themselves for a defense of the castle. They see farmers approaching the castle, but are disappointed when they fail to attack. The film ends with the four men, armed, storming out of the castle's front gates. The film's actors have no dialogue; the only spoken text is delivered by a narrator, who discusses his thoughts on war and various other subjects.

== Release ==
The film was released in April 1967, at the Oberhausen Short Film Festival.

== Reception ==
Maria Popova (The Marginalian), found that "(There is a) certain self-reliance that permeates (Herzog's) films and his mind, a refusal to let the fear of failure inhibit trying — a sensibility the voiceover in the final scene of Herzog’s The Unprecedented Defence of the Fortress Deutschkreuz captures perfectly: “Even a defeat is better than nothing at all.”
