= Deutschkreutz =

- Municipality
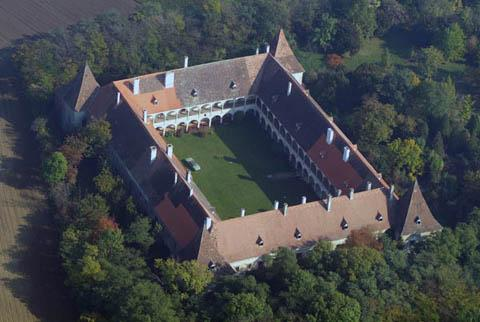

- Coat of arms

- Location within Burgenland Location within Austria
- Coordinates: 47°36′06″N 16°37′41″E
- Country: Austria
- State: Burgenland
- District: Oberpullendorf

Government
  - Mayor: Manfred Kölly (FBL)

Area
  - Total: 34.11 km^{2} (13.17 sq mi)

Population (2018-01-01)
  - Total: 3,088
  - Density: 90.53/km^{2} (234.5/sq mi)
- Time zone: UTC+1 (CET)
  - Summer (DST): UTC+2 (CEST)
- Postal code: 7301
- Vehicle registration: OP
- Website: www.deutschkreutz.at

Deutschkreutz (Hungarian: Sopronkeresztúr until 1899, Németkeresztúr Yiddish: צעלעם, romanized: Zelem Croatian: Kerestur) is an Austrian market town in the district of Oberpullendorf in the state of Burgenland.

== Geography ==
Deutschkreutz lies in Middle Burgenland. It is divided into the districts of Deutschkreutz and Girm. The town, like its neighbors Unterpetersdorf, Horitschon, and Neckenmarkt, is located in Blaufränkischland.

== History ==
Deutschkreutz has been a market town since 1340 (no documentation 1370-1429). The town belonged to Hungary as part of Sopron County until 1920. After the end of World War I, the territory was given to Austria by the Treaties of St. Germain and Trianon. Since 1921, the town has belonged to the newly founded State of Burgenland.

In Jewish history, Deutschkreutz was one of the Seven Communities of Burgenland.

== Population ==
Historical population
Year	Pop.	±%
1869	3,177	—
1880	3,184	+0.2%
1890	3,646	+14.5%
1900	3,952	+8.4%
1910	3,891	−1.5%
1923	3,929	+1.0%
1934	4,220	+7.4%
1939	3,796	−10.0%
1951	3,852	+1.5%
1961	3,901	+1.3%
1971	3,673	−5.8%
1981	3,522	−4.1%
1991	3,327	−5.5%
2001	3,221	−3.2%
2011	3,136	−2.6%
2016	3,102	−1.1%

== Politics ==
Deutschkreutz's mayor is Manfred Kölly who was expelled from the FPÖ in December 2006. Vice mayors are Mag. Robert Friedl of the SPÖ and Paul Fennes of the ÖVP. Its chief officer is Stefan Schöller.

The mandate assignments in the Municipal Council (23 seats) are SPÖ 11, ÖVP 7, FPÖ 5, Grüne 0, and other lists 0.

== Climate ==
Climate data for Deutschkreutz (1971–2000)
Month	Jan	Feb	Mar	Apr	May	Jun	Jul	Aug	Sep	Oct	Nov	Dec	Year
Record high °C (°F)	16.0 (60.8)	20.4 (68.7)	25.7 (78.3)	28.1 (82.6)	31.3 (88.3)	33.6 (92.5)	36.1 (97.0)	37.4 (99.3)	34.0 (93.2)	26.5 (79.7)	20.5 (68.9)	19.9 (67.8)	37.4 (99.3)
Mean daily maximum °C (°F)	2.7 (36.9)	4.9 (40.8)	10.3 (50.5)	15.3 (59.5)	20.7 (69.3)	23.5 (74.3)	26.2 (79.2)	26.0 (78.8)	21.1 (70.0)	15.0 (59.0)	7.5 (45.5)	4.0 (39.2)	14.8 (58.6)
Daily mean °C (°F)	−1.0 (30.2)	0.5 (32.9)	5.0 (41.0)	9.4 (48.9)	14.8 (58.6)	17.8 (64.0)	20.0 (68.0)	19.5 (67.1)	14.8 (58.6)	9.2 (48.6)	3.5 (38.3)	0.7 (33.3)	9.5 (49.1)
Mean daily minimum °C (°F)	−3.8 (25.2)	−2.6 (27.3)	1.1 (34.0)	4.6 (40.3)	9.2 (48.6)	12.3 (54.1)	14.2 (57.6)	14.1 (57.4)	10.4 (50.7)	5.4 (41.7)	0.6 (33.1)	−1.9 (28.6)	5.3 (41.5)
Record low °C (°F)	−22.0 (−7.6)	−20.5 (−4.9)	−21.0 (−5.8)	−4.5 (23.9)	−1.6 (29.1)	4.5 (40.1)	6.0 (42.8)	4.5 (40.1)	1.5 (34.7)	−6.0 (21.2)	−13.0 (8.6)	−19.0 (−2.2)	−22.0 (−7.6)
Average precipitation mm (inches)	29.8 (1.17)	28.2 (1.11)	36.4 (1.43)	43.6 (1.72)	71.8 (2.83)	86.3 (3.40)	61.2 (2.41)	65.1 (2.56)	60.5 (2.38)	45.4 (1.79)	53.0 (2.09)	36.0 (1.42)	617.3 (24.30)
Average snowfall cm (inches)	17.4 (6.9)	14.2 (5.6)	8.5 (3.3)	1.0 (0.4)	0.0 (0.0)	0.0 (0.0)	0.0 (0.0)	0.0 (0.0)	0.0 (0.0)	0.0 (0.0)	8.7 (3.4)	19.3 (7.6)	69.1 (27.2)
Average precipitation days (≥ 1.0 mm)	5.7	5.6	7.4	6.4	9.2	10.1	7.9	7.8	7.1	5.9	8.0	7.1	88.2
Average relative humidity (%) (at 14:00)	67.9	61.7	54.8	47.7	49.1	51.3	46.5	47.5	52.4	58.5	69.5	72.3	56.6
Source: Central Institute for Meteorology and Geodynamics

== Personalities ==
- Elizabeth Báthory
- Lajos Dóczi

== See also ==
- The Unprecedented Defence of the Fortress Deutschkreuz
