= Liebing =

Liebing is a German surname that may refer to:

- Chris Liebing (born 1968), German techno producer and DJ
- Franziska Liebing (1899–1989), Swedish actress
- Otto Liebing (1891–1967), German rower who competed in the 1912 Summer Olympics

== See also ==
- Liebing, a town in Burgenland, Austria
