= Frankenau-Unterpullendorf =

Frankenau-Unterpullendorf Frakanava-Dolnja Pulja
- Municipality
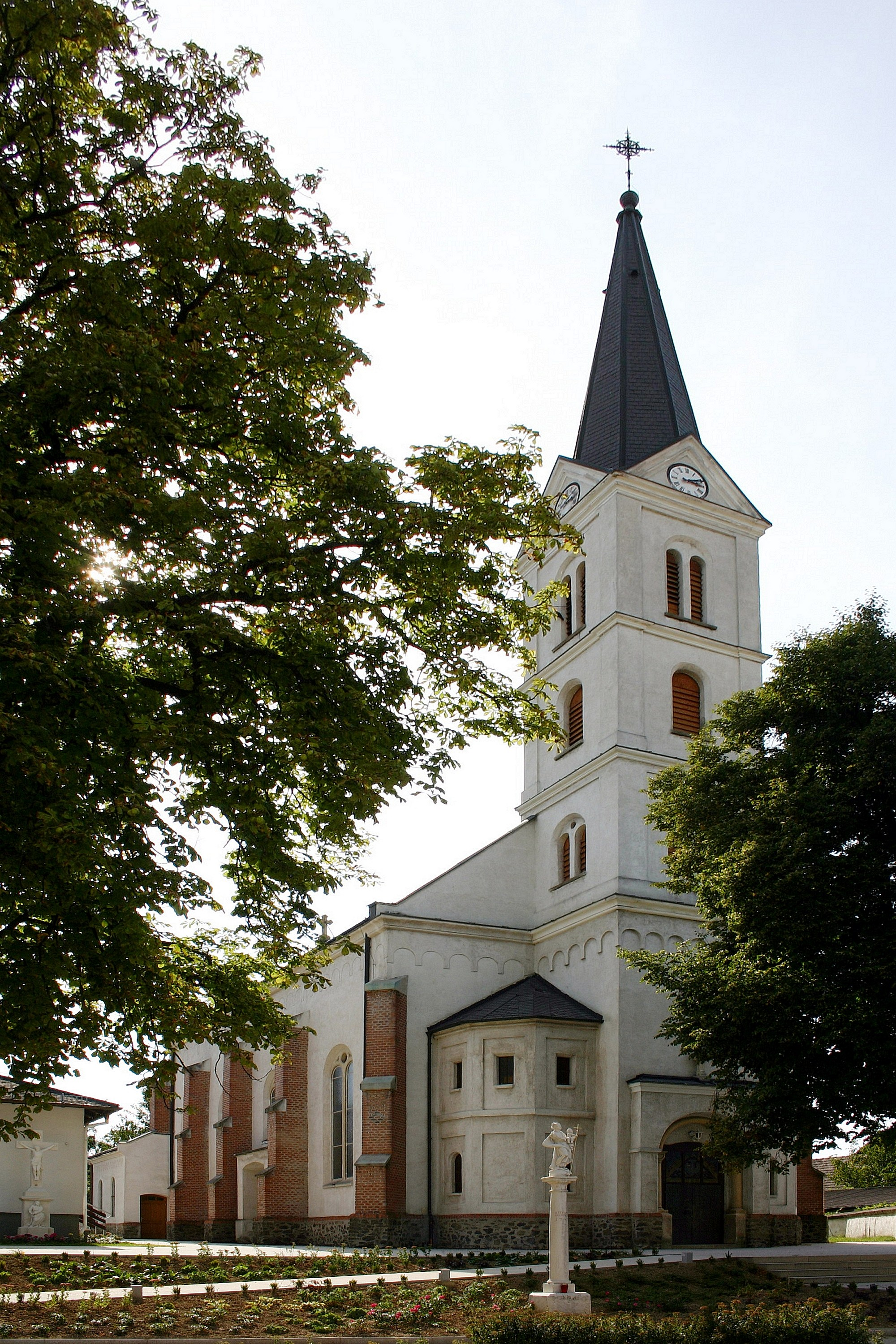
- Parish Church of Saint Bartholomew in Unterpullendorf

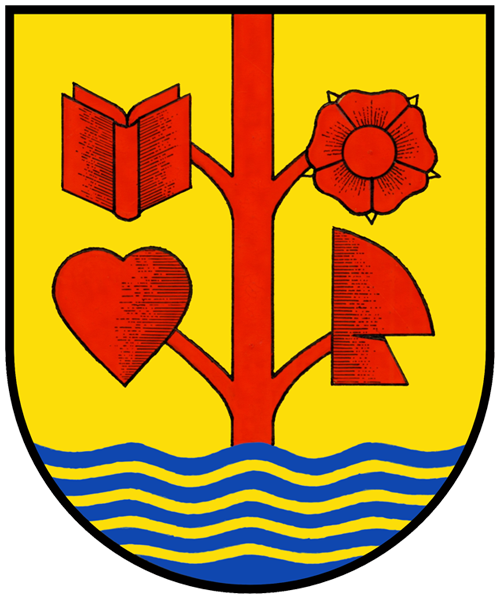
- Coat of arms

- Location within Austria
- Coordinates: 47°27′N 16°36′E
- Country: Austria
- State: Burgenland
- District: Oberpullendorf

Government
  - Mayor: Angelika Mileder (ÖVP)

Area
  - Total: 29.95 km^{2} (11.56 sq mi)

Population (2018-01-01)
  - Total: 1,109
  - Density: 37.03/km^{2} (95.90/sq mi)
- Time zone: UTC+1 (CET)
  - Summer (DST): UTC+2 (CEST)
- Postal code: 7452, 7361
- Area code: 02615
- Website: www.frankenau-unterpullendorf.at

Frankenau-Unterpullendorf (Croatian: Frakanava-Dolnja Pulja, Hungarian: Répcesarud-Alsópulya) is a town in the district of Oberpullendorf in the Austrian state of Burgenland.

== History ==
In ancient times, the area was part of the Celtic kingdom of Noricum, and belonged to the surroundings of the Celtic hillfort castle on Castle Hill Schwarzenbacher.

Later under the Romans, the modern-day places of Frankenau und Unterpullendorf were in the province of Pannonia.

The formerly independent places were, like the rest of Burgenland, as part of Hungary until 1920/21 (German West Hungary). Since 1898, the Hungarian place names or Répcesarud-Alsópulya had to be used because of the Magyarization (Magyarisierungspolitik) of the government in Budapest. After the end of World War I, German West Hungary was awarded, after tough negotiations in the Treaty of St. Germain and Trianon, to Austria in 1919. The locations are from 1921 to the newly founded State of Burgenland.

== Population ==
Historical population
Year	Pop.	±%
1869	2,403	—
1880	2,451	+2.0%
1890	2,545	+3.8%
1900	2,535	−0.4%
1910	2,663	+5.0%
1923	2,626	−1.4%
1934	2,371	−9.7%
1939	2,114	−10.8%
1951	2,057	−2.7%
1961	1,745	−15.2%
1971	1,620	−7.2%
1981	1,438	−11.2%
1991	1,335	−7.2%
2001	1,248	−6.5%
2011	1,180	−5.4%
