= Oberpullendorf District =

Coordinates: 47.534°N 16.496°E

Oberpullendorf District Bezirk Oberpullendorf
- District
- Country: Austria
- State: Burgenland
- Number of municipalities: 27
- Administrative seat: Oberpullendorf

Government
  - District Governor: Klaus Trummer

Area
  - Total: 648.39 km^{2} (250.34 sq mi)

Population (2022)
  - Total: 37,524
  - Density: 57.873/km^{2} (149.89/sq mi)
- Time zone: UTC+01:00 (CET)
  - Summer (DST): UTC+02:00 (CEST)
- Vehicle registration: OP
- NUTS code: AT111

Bezirk Oberpullendorf (Croatian: Kotar Gornja Pulja; Hungarian: Felsőpulya Járás) is a district of the state of Burgenland in Austria. As of 2023, it had a population of 37,743.

== Municipalities ==
Towns (Städte) are indicated in boldface; market towns (Marktgemeinden) in italics; suburbs, hamlets and other subdivisions of a municipality are indicated in small characters. Where appropriate, the Hungarian or Croatian names are given in parentheses.

- Deutschkreutz (3,126)
  - Girm
- Draßmarkt (1,376)
  - Karl, Oberrabnitz
- Frankenau-Unterpullendorf (Frakanava-Dolnja Pulja) (1,179)
  - Frankenau, Großmutschen, Kleinmutschen, Unterpullendorf
- Großwarasdorf (Veliki Borištof) (1,452)
  - Kleinwarasdorf, Langental, Nebersdorf
- Horitschon (1,881)
  - Unterpetersdorf
- Kaisersdorf (Kalištrof) (610)
- Kobersdorf (1,928)
  - Lindgraben, Oberpetersdorf
- Lackenbach (1,112)
- Lackendorf (570)
- Lockenhaus (2,011)
  - Glashütten bei Langeck im Burgenland, Hammerteich, Hochstraß, Langeck im Burgenland
- Lutzmannsburg (885)
  - Strebersdorf
- Mannersdorf an der Rabnitz (1,804)
  - Klostermarienberg, Liebing, Rattersdorf, Unterloisdorf
- Markt Sankt Martin (1,175)
  - Landsee, Neudorf bei Landsee
- Neckenmarkt (1,695)
  - Haschendorf
- Neutal (1,055)
- Nikitsch (Filež) (1,424)
  - Kroatisch Geresdorf (Gerištof), Kroatisch Minihof (Mjenovo)
- Oberloisdorf (780)
- Oberpullendorf (Hungarian: Felsőpulya) (3,029)
  - Mitterpullendorf
- Pilgersdorf (1,661)
  - Bubendorf im Burgenland, Deutsch Gerisdorf, Kogl im Burgenland, Lebenbrunn, Salmannsdorf im Burgenland, Steinbach im Burgenland
- Piringsdorf (863)
- Raiding (815)
- Ritzing (916)
- Steinberg-Dörfl (1,259)
  - Dörfl, Steinberg
- Stoob (1,466)
- Unterfrauenhaid (665)
- Unterrabnitz-Schwendgraben (650)
  - Schwendgraben, Unterrabnitz
- Weingraben (Bajngrob) (362)
- Weppersdorf (1,838)
  - Kalkgruben, Tschurndorf
