= Steinberg-Dörfl =

- Municipality
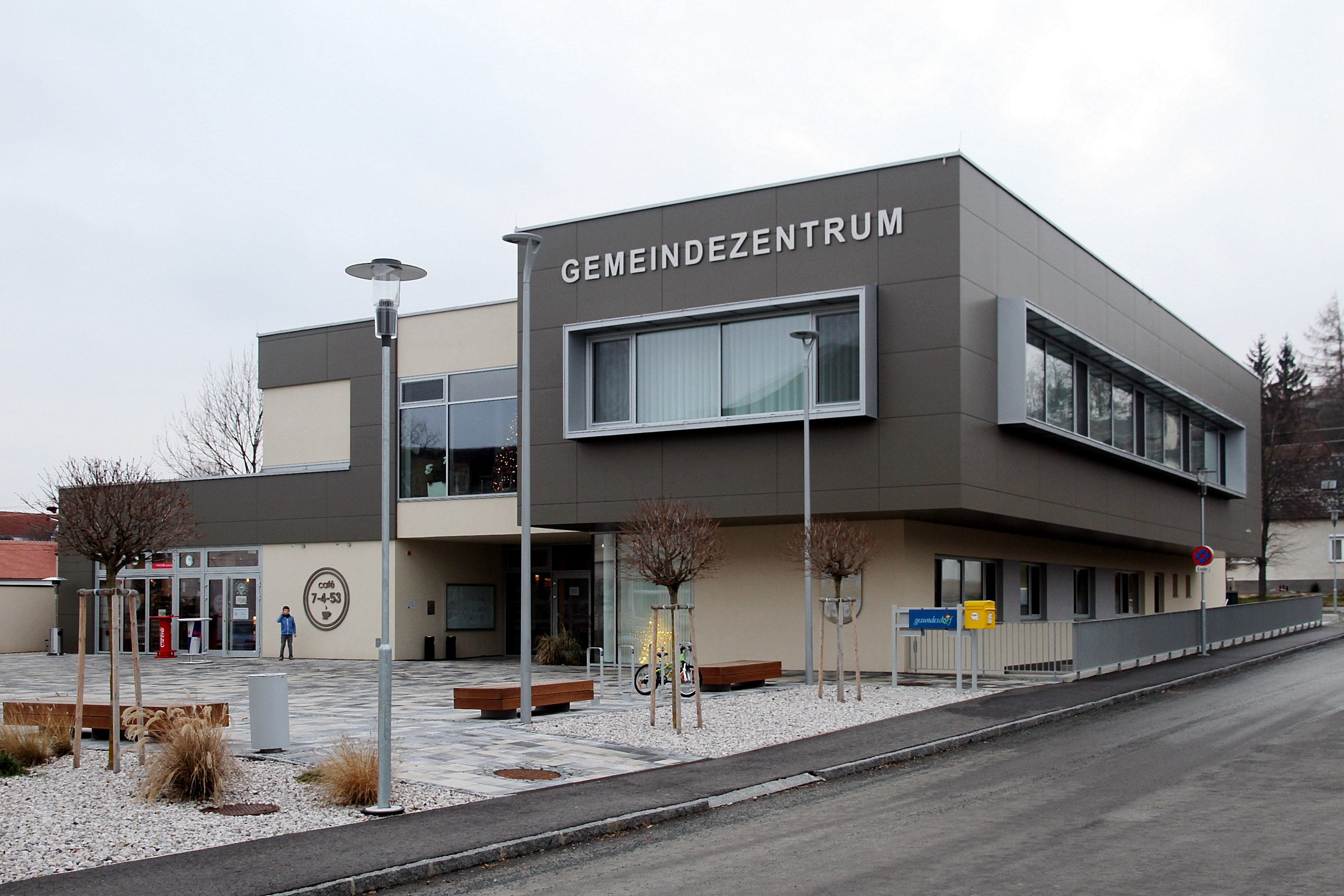
- Municipal office

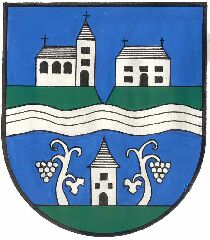
- Coat of arms

- Location within Austria
- Coordinates: 47°29′N 16°29′E
- Country: Austria
- State: Burgenland
- District: Oberpullendorf

Government
  - Mayor: Klaudia Friedl (SPÖ)

Area
  - Total: 37.14 km^{2} (14.34 sq mi)

Population (2018-01-01)
  - Total: 1,291
  - Density: 34.76/km^{2} (90.03/sq mi)
- Time zone: UTC+1 (CET)
  - Summer (DST): UTC+2 (CEST)
- Postal code: 7463

Steinberg-Dörfl (Croatian: Štamperak-Drfelj, Hungarian: Répcekőhalom-Dérföld) is a town in the district of Oberpullendorf in the Austrian state of Burgenland.

== Population ==
Historical population
Year	Pop.	±%
1869	1,913	—
1880	1,999	+4.5%
1890	1,932	−3.4%
1900	1,995	+3.3%
1910	1,981	−0.7%
1923	1,894	−4.4%
1934	1,985	+4.8%
1939	1,677	−15.5%
1951	1,575	−6.1%
1961	1,425	−9.5%
1971	1,379	−3.2%
1981	1,295	−6.1%
1991	1,186	−8.4%
2001	1,252	+5.6%
2011	1,258	+0.5%
