= Lackendorf =

- Municipality
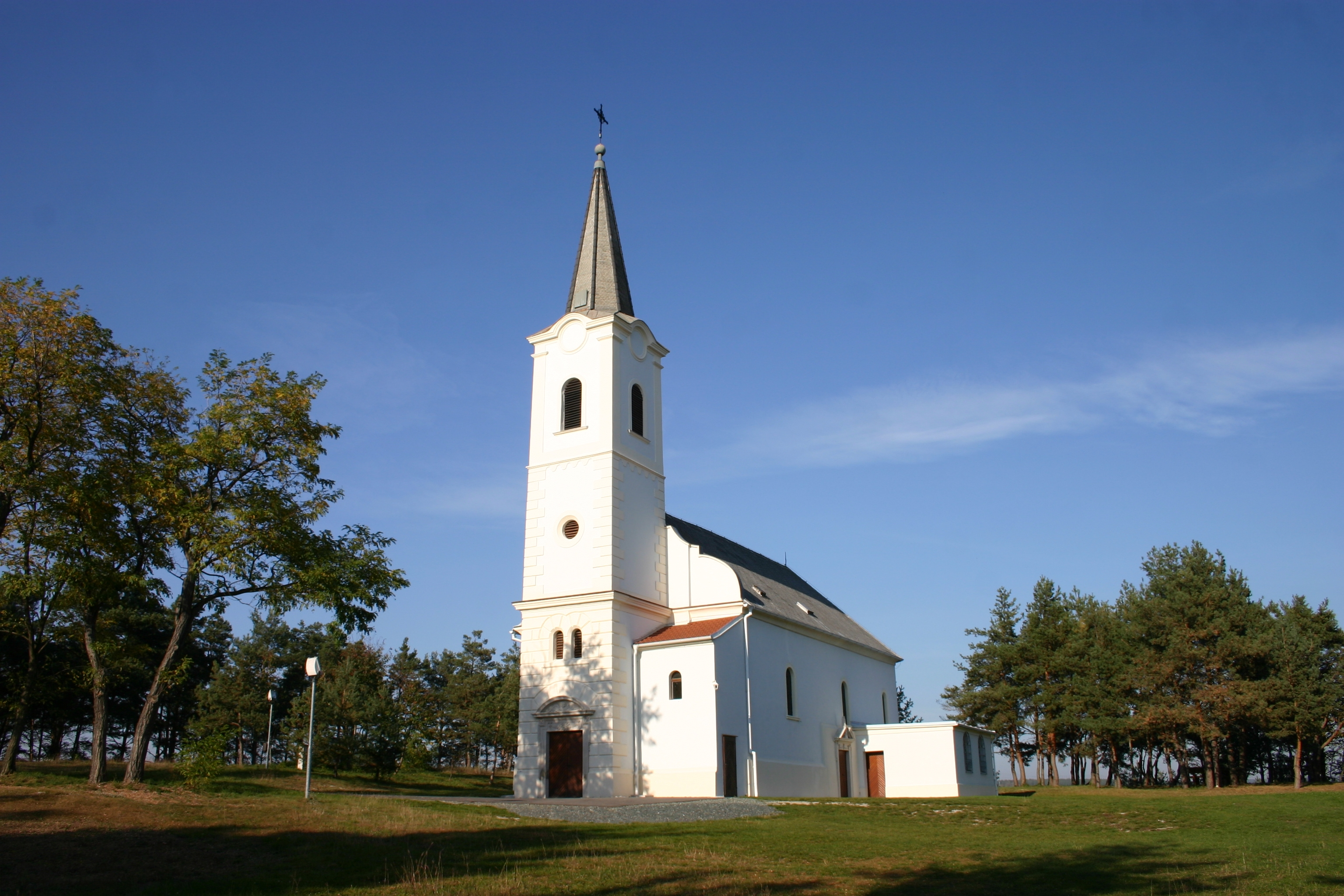
- Saint Roch Church

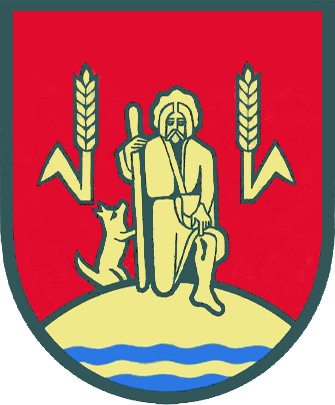
- Coat of arms

- Location within Austria
- Coordinates: 47°35′N 16°30′E
- Country: Austria
- State: Burgenland
- District: Oberpullendorf

Government
  - Mayor: Werner Hofer (SPÖ)

Area
  - Total: 12.71 km^{2} (4.91 sq mi)

Population (2018-01-01)
  - Total: 604
  - Density: 47.5/km^{2} (123/sq mi)
- Time zone: UTC+1 (CET)
  - Summer (DST): UTC+2 (CEST)
- Postal code: 7321
- Website: www.lackendorf.at

Lackendorf (Croatian: Lakindrof, Hungarian: Lakfalva) is a town in the district of Oberpullendorf in the Austrian state of Burgenland.

== Population ==
Historical population
| Year | Pop. | ±% |
|---|---|---|
| 1869 | 604 | — |
| 1880 | 575 | −4.8% |
| 1890 | 578 | +0.5% |
| 1900 | 691 | +19.6% |
| 1910 | 629 | −9.0% |
| 1923 | 727 | +15.6% |
| 1934 | 716 | −1.5% |
| 1939 | 611 | −14.7% |
| 1951 | 624 | +2.1% |
| 1961 | 680 | +9.0% |
| 1971 | 639 | −6.0% |
| 1981 | 613 | −4.1% |
| 1991 | 594 | −3.1% |
| 2001 | 600 | +1.0% |
| 2011 | 592 | −1.3% |
