= Unterrabnitz-Schwendgraben =

- Municipality
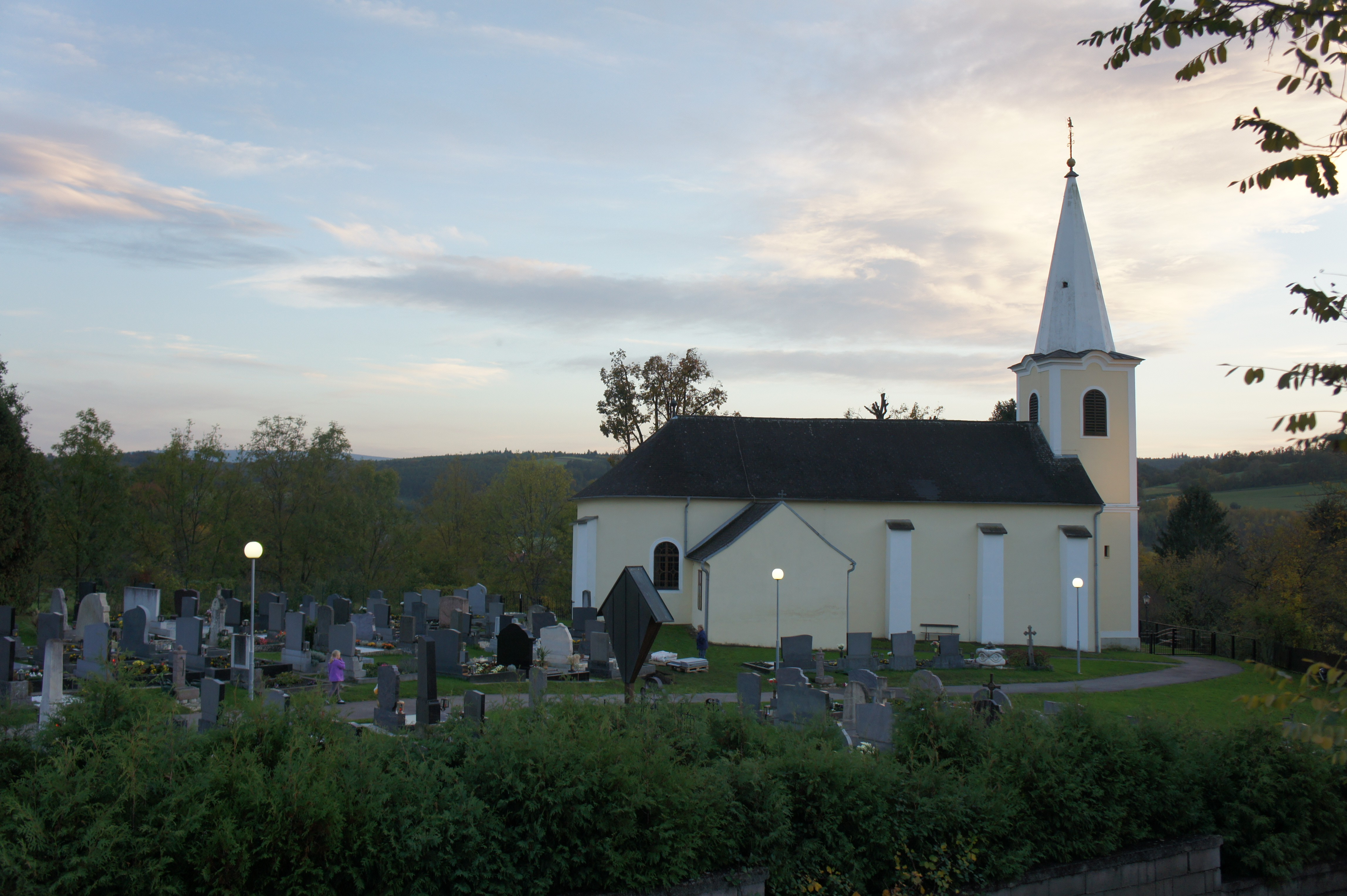
- Church of Saints Peter and Paul in Unterrabnitz

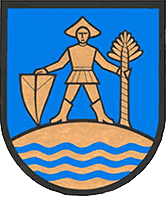
- Coat of arms

- Location within Austria
- Coordinates: 47°27′N 16°23′E
- Country: Austria
- State: Burgenland
- District: Oberpullendorf

Government
  - Mayor: Franz Haspel (ÖVP)

Area
  - Total: 13.93 km^{2} (5.38 sq mi)

Population (2018-01-01)
  - Total: 650
  - Density: 47/km^{2} (120/sq mi)
- Time zone: UTC+1 (CET)
  - Summer (DST): UTC+2 (CEST)
- Postal code: 7371

Unterrabnitz-Schwendgraben (Croatian: Dolnji Ramac, Hungarian: Alsórámóc-Répcefő) is a town in the district of Oberpullendorf in the Austrian state of Burgenland.

== Population ==
Historical population
Year	Pop.	±%
1869	857	—
1880	863	+0.7%
1890	805	−6.7%
1900	749	−7.0%
1910	786	+4.9%
1923	745	−5.2%
1934	725	−2.7%
1939	655	−9.7%
1951	624	−4.7%
1961	586	−6.1%
1971	591	+0.9%
1981	628	+6.3%
1991	601	−4.3%
2001	634	+5.5%
2011	659	+3.9%
