= Vasszentmihály =

- Coat of arms

- Location of Vasszentmihály in Hungary
- Coordinates: 46°58′11.17″N 16°24′22.28″E
- Country: Hungary
- Region: Western Transdanubia
- County: Vas
- Subregion: Szentgotthárdi
- Rank: Village

Area
  - Total: 6.41 km^{2} (2.47 sq mi)

Population (1 January 2008)
  - Total: 364
  - Density: 56.8/km^{2} (147/sq mi)
- Time zone: UTC+1 (CET)
  - Summer (DST): UTC+2 (CEST)
- Postal code: 9953
- Area code: +36 94
- KSH code: 11633
- Website: www.vasszentmihaly.hu

Vasszentmihály is a village in Vas county, Hungary.
