= Neutal =

- Municipality
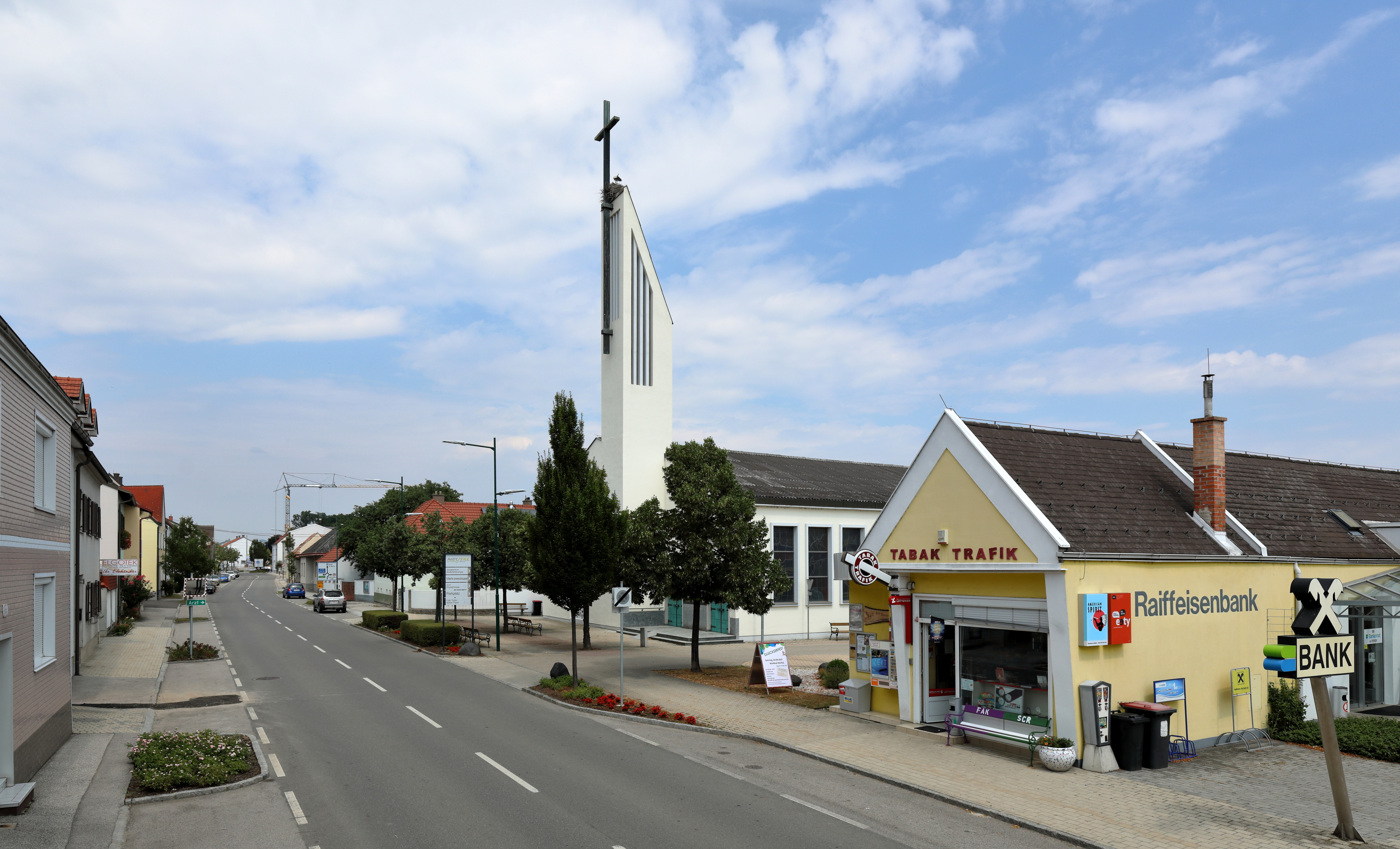
- Center of Neutal

- Coat of arms

- Location within Austria
- Coordinates: 47°33′N 16°27′E
- Country: Austria
- State: Burgenland
- District: Oberpullendorf

Government
  - Mayor: Erich Trummer (SPÖ)

Area
  - Total: 11.57 km^{2} (4.47 sq mi)
- Elevation: 274 m (899 ft)

Population (2018-01-01)
  - Total: 1,094
  - Density: 94.55/km^{2} (244.9/sq mi)
- Time zone: UTC+1 (CET)
  - Summer (DST): UTC+2 (CEST)
- Postal code: 7343
- Website: www.neutal.at

Neutal (Croatian: Najtolj, Hungarian: Sopronújlak, Nyujtál) is a town in the district of Oberpullendorf in the Austrian state of Burgenland.

== Population ==
Historical population
Year	Pop.	±%
1869	759	—
1880	885	+16.6%
1890	1,036	+17.1%
1900	996	−3.9%
1910	1,116	+12.0%
1923	1,124	+0.7%
1934	1,311	+16.6%
1939	1,126	−14.1%
1951	1,153	+2.4%
1961	1,088	−5.6%
1971	1,061	−2.5%
1981	1,078	+1.6%
1991	1,085	+0.6%
2001	1,027	−5.3%
2011	1,036	+0.9%
