= Draßmarkt =

- Municipality
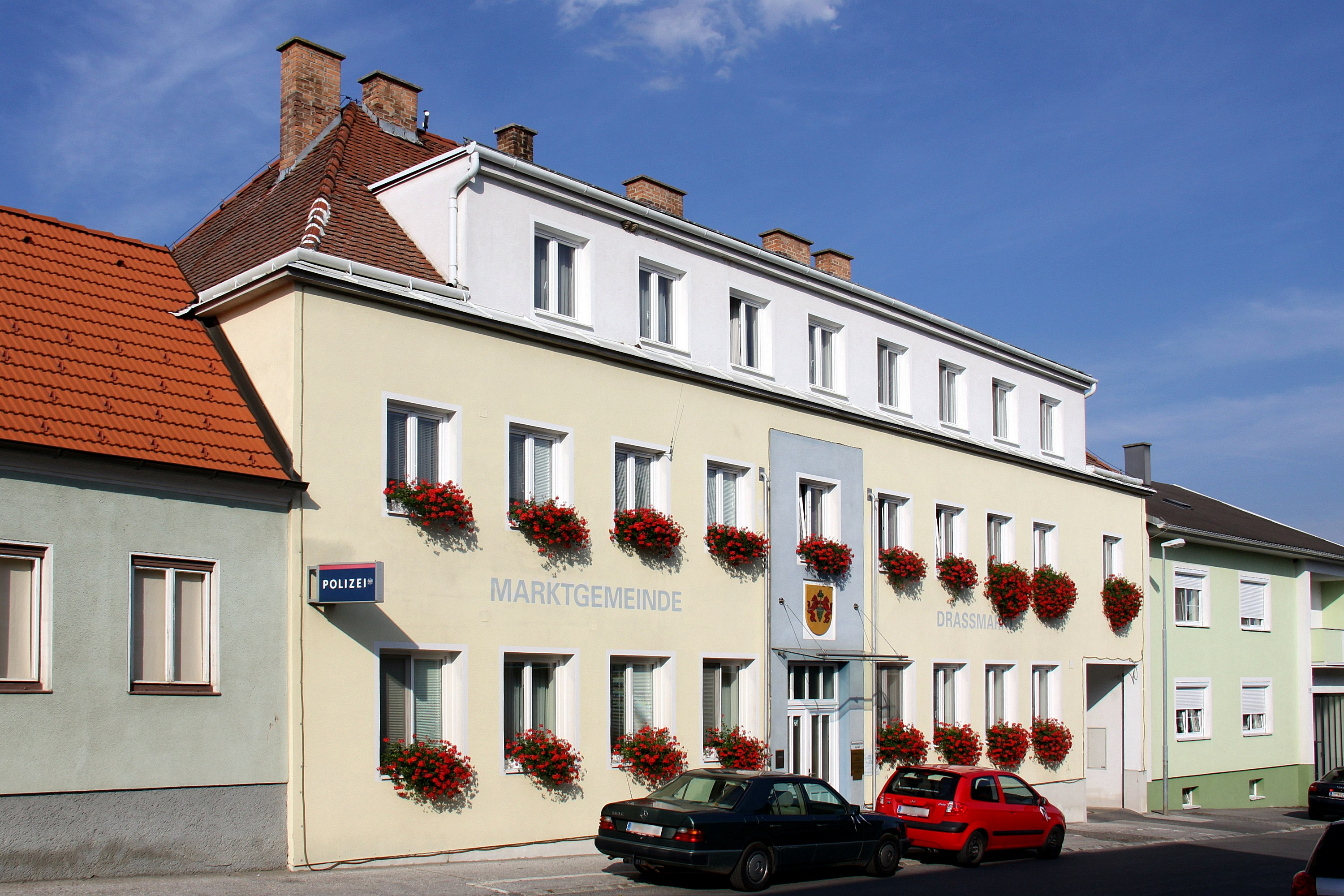
- Municipal office

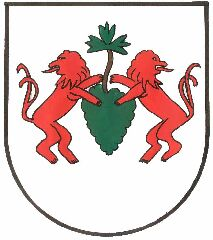
- Coat of arms

- Location within Austria
- Coordinates: 47°31′N 16°24′E
- Country: Austria
- State: Burgenland
- District: Oberpullendorf

Government
  - Mayor: Anton Wiedenhofer (ÖVP)

Area
  - Total: 36.23 km^{2} (13.99 sq mi)
- Elevation: 341 m (1,119 ft)

Population (2018-01-01)
  - Total: 1,388
  - Density: 38.31/km^{2} (99.22/sq mi)
- Time zone: UTC+1 (CET)
  - Summer (DST): UTC+2 (CEST)
- Postal code: 7372
- Website: http://www.drassmarkt.at/

Draßmarkt (Croatian: Racindrof, Hungarian: Vámosderecske, until 1899 Sopronderecske) is a town in the district of Oberpullendorf in the Austrian state of Burgenland.

== Population ==
Historical population
Year	Pop.	±%
1869	1,768	—
1880	1,831	+3.6%
1890	1,818	−0.7%
1900	1,866	+2.6%
1910	1,921	+2.9%
1923	1,879	−2.2%
1934	1,812	−3.6%
1939	1,712	−5.5%
1951	1,641	−4.1%
1961	1,622	−1.2%
1971	1,592	−1.8%
1981	1,502	−5.7%
1991	1,510	+0.5%
2001	1,411	−6.6%
2011	1,268	−10.1%
