= Stoob =

- Municipality
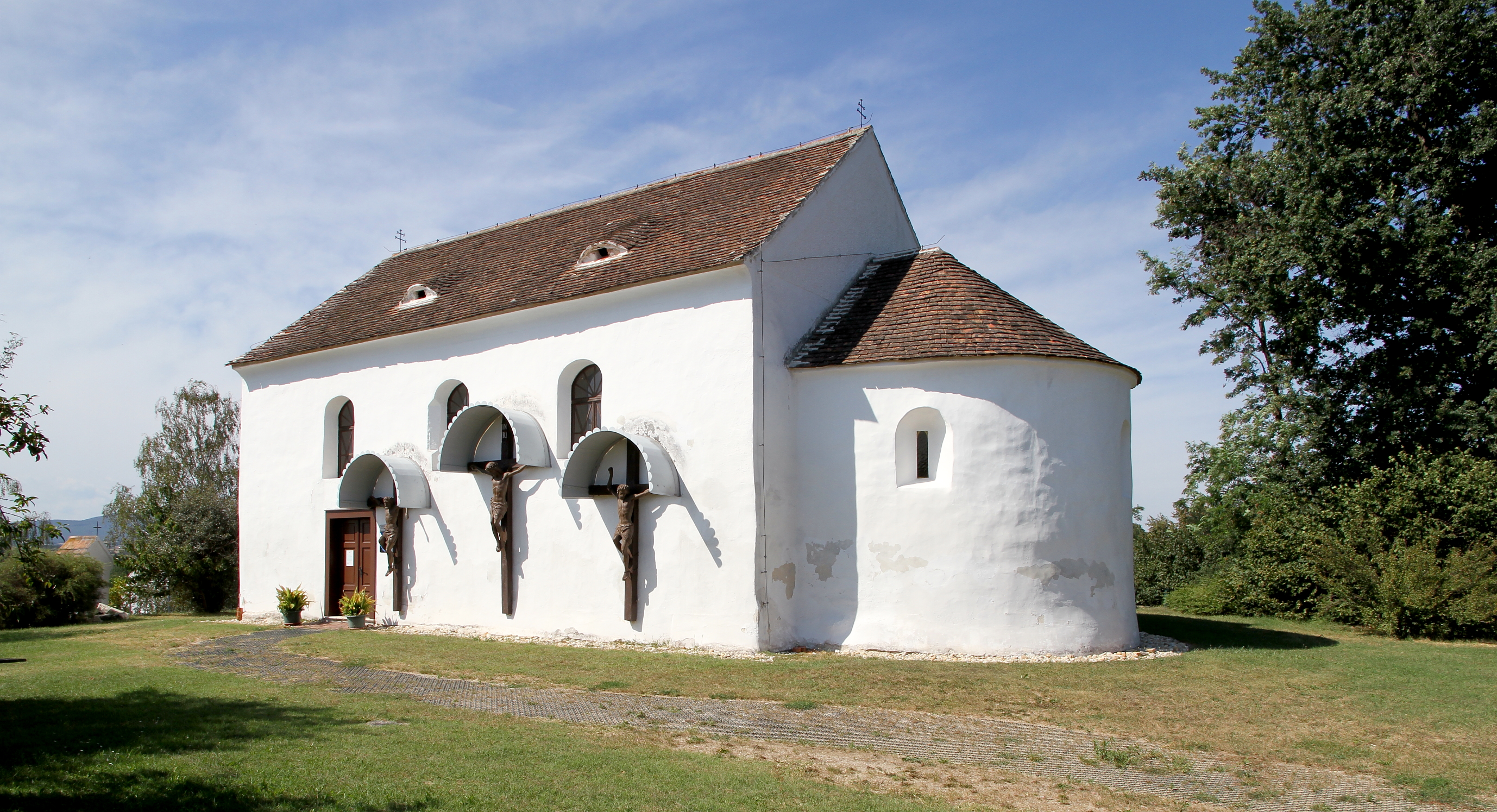
- Church of Saint John the Baptist

- Coat of arms

- Location within Austria
- Coordinates: 47°32′N 16°29′E
- Country: Austria
- State: Burgenland
- District: Oberpullendorf

Government
  - Mayor: Bruno Stutzenstein (SPÖ)

Area
  - Total: 17.38 km^{2} (6.71 sq mi)

Population (2018-01-01)
  - Total: 1,386
  - Density: 79.75/km^{2} (206.5/sq mi)
- Time zone: UTC+1 (CET)
  - Summer (DST): UTC+2 (CEST)
- Postal code: 7344
- Website: www.stoob.at

Stoob (German pronunciation: [ʃtoːp]; Croatian: Štuma, Hungarian: Csáva) is a town in the district of Oberpullendorf in the Austrian state of Burgenland. It is approximately 15 km from the Austrian border. Stoob is notable for its pottery and ceramics college.

== Population ==
Historical population
Year	Pop.	±%
1869	1,245	—
1880	1,294	+3.9%
1890	1,423	+10.0%
1900	1,429	+0.4%
1910	1,395	−2.4%
1923	1,401	+0.4%
1934	1,492	+6.5%
1939	1,344	−9.9%
1951	1,348	+0.3%
1961	1,307	−3.0%
1971	1,342	+2.7%
1981	1,356	+1.0%
1991	1,335	−1.5%
2001	1,385	+3.7%
2011	1,432	+3.4%
