= Ritzing =

- Municipality
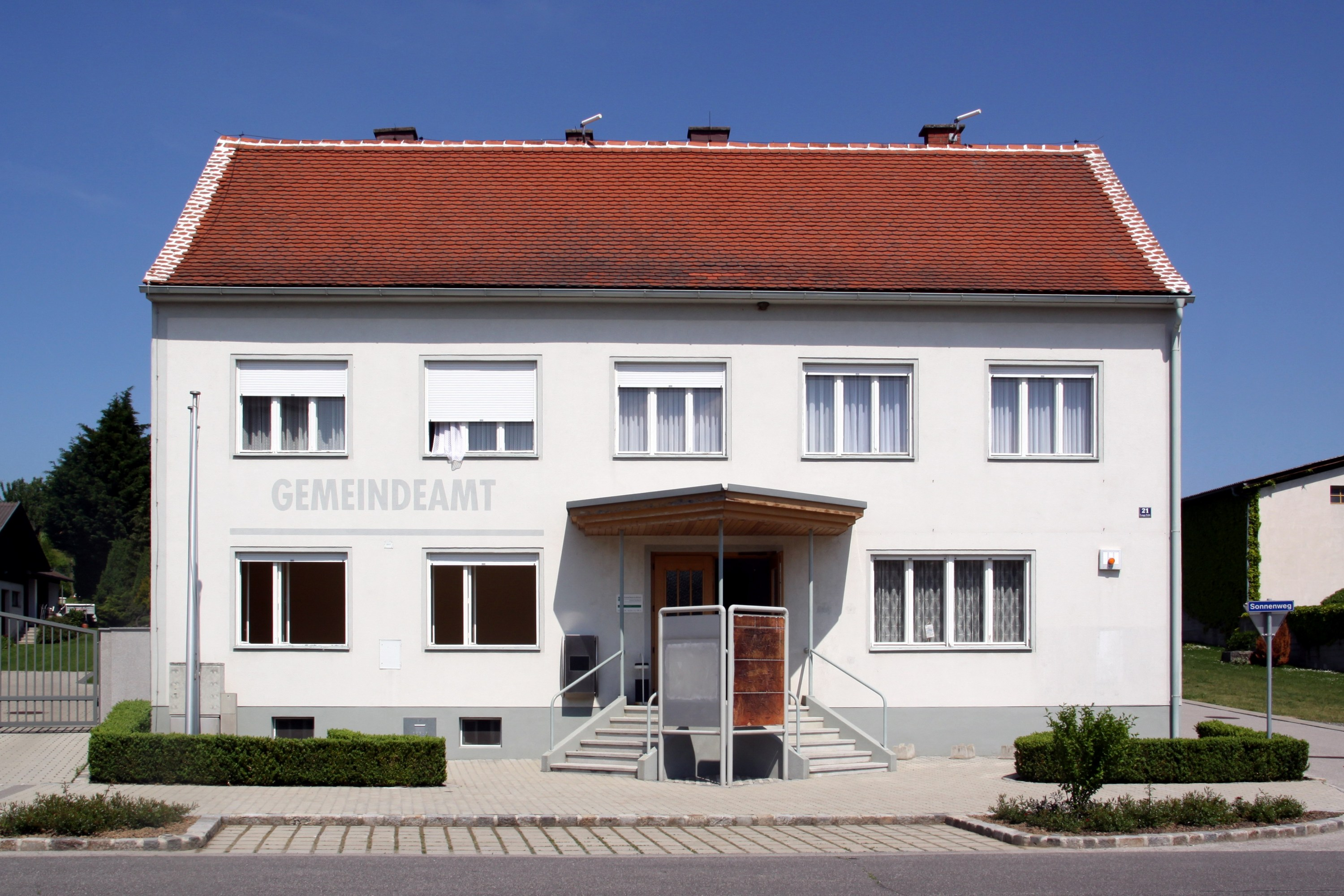
- Municipal office

- Coat of arms

- Location within Austria
- Coordinates: 47°37′N 16°30′E
- Country: Austria
- State: Burgenland
- District: Oberpullendorf

Government
  - Mayor: Ernst Horvath (ÖVP)

Area
  - Total: 17.7 km^{2} (6.8 sq mi)

Population (2018-01-01)
  - Total: 902
  - Density: 51.0/km^{2} (132/sq mi)
- Time zone: UTC+1 (CET)
  - Summer (DST): UTC+2 (CEST)
- Postal code: 7323
- Website: www.ritzing.at

Ritzing (Croatian: Ricinja, Hungarian: Récény) is a town in the district of Oberpullendorf in the Austrian state of Burgenland.

== Population ==
Historical population
Year	Pop.	±%
1869	876	—
1880	967	+10.4%
1890	1,096	+13.3%
1900	1,455	+32.8%
1910	1,434	−1.4%
1923	1,632	+13.8%
1934	1,634	+0.1%
1939	1,459	−10.7%
1951	1,420	−2.7%
1961	1,132	−20.3%
1971	968	−14.5%
1981	901	−6.9%
1991	909	+0.9%
2001	894	−1.7%
2011	912	+2.0%

== Sport ==
It is most famous for its football club, the SC Ritzing. The Arsenal FC football team played a Burgenland XI in the town, on Monday, July 28, 2008, and beat the team 10–2, with Arsenal scoring 7 goals before half time.
