= Markt Sankt Martin =

- Municipality
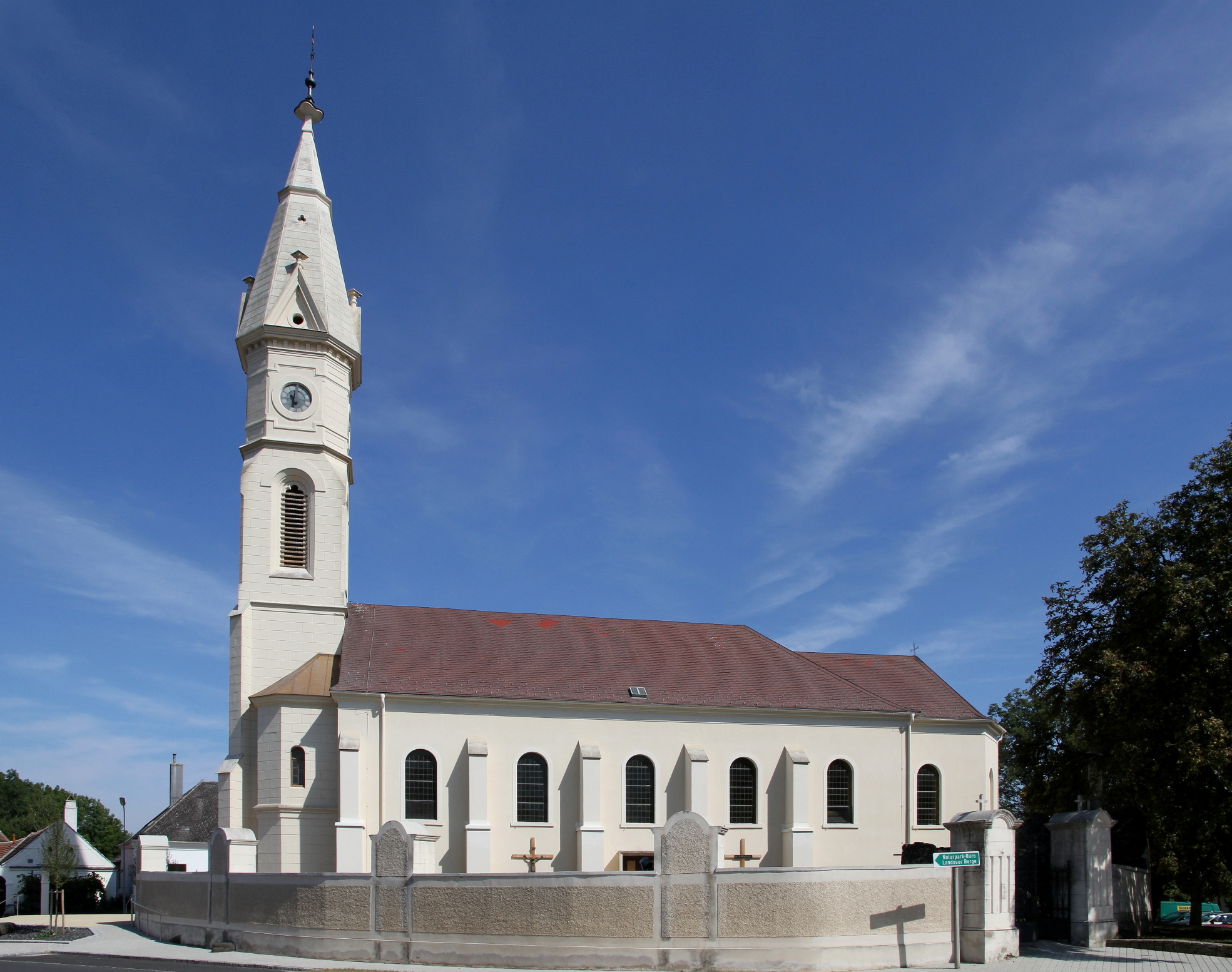
- Parish Church of Saint Martin

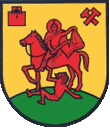
- Coat of arms

- Location within Burgenland Location within Austria
- Coordinates: 47°34′N 16°26′E
- Country: Austria
- State: Burgenland
- District: Oberpullendorf

Government
  - Mayor: Jürgen Karall (SPÖ)

Area
  - Total: 32.11 km^{2} (12.40 sq mi)
- Elevation: 361 m (1,184 ft)

Population (2018-01-01)
  - Total: 1,198
  - Density: 37.31/km^{2} (96.63/sq mi)
- Time zone: UTC+1 (CET)
  - Summer (DST): UTC+2 (CEST)
- Postal code: 7341

Markt Sankt Martin (Hungarian: Sopronszentmárton, Croatian: Sveti Martin) is a town in the district of Oberpullendorf in the Austrian state of Burgenland.

== Population ==
Historical population
Year	Pop.	±%
1869	1,585	—
1880	1,815	+14.5%
1890	1,751	−3.5%
1900	1,703	−2.7%
1910	1,745	+2.5%
1923	1,809	+3.7%
1934	1,909	+5.5%
1939	1,742	−8.7%
1951	1,683	−3.4%
1961	1,453	−13.7%
1971	1,356	−6.7%
1981	1,232	−9.1%
1991	1,170	−5.0%
2001	1,171	+0.1%
2011	1,186	+1.3%
