= Lutzmannsburg =

- Municipality
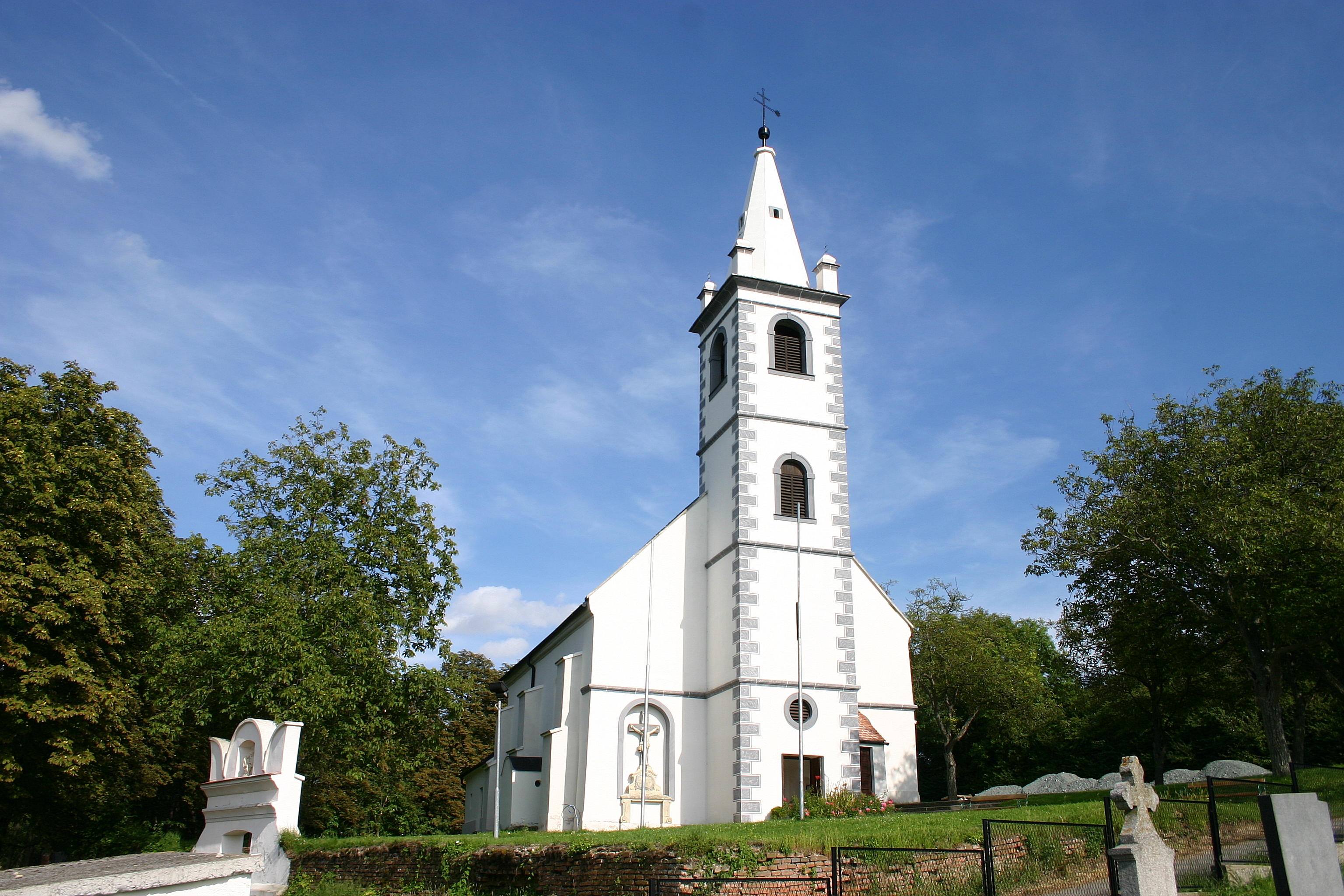
- Catholic church

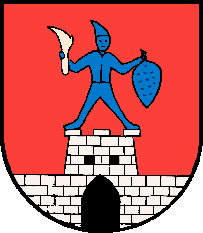
- Coat of arms

- Location within Austria
- Coordinates: 47°28′N 16°38′E
- Country: Hungary
- State: Burgenland
- District: Oberpullendorf

Government
  - Mayor: Christian Rohrer

Area
  - Total: 23.18 km^{2} (8.95 sq mi)
- Elevation: 206 m (676 ft)

Population (2018-01-01)
  - Total: 861
  - Density: 37.1/km^{2} (96.2/sq mi)
- Time zone: UTC+1 (CET)
  - Summer (DST): UTC+2 (CEST)
- Postal code: 7361
- Website: www.lutzmannsburg.at

Lutzmannsburg (Croatian: Lucman, Hungarian: Locsmánd) is a village in the district of Oberpullendorf in the Austrian state of Burgenland.

== Population ==
Historical population
Year	Pop.	±%
1869	1,680	—
1880	1,780	+6.0%
1890	1,783	+0.2%
1900	1,862	+4.4%
1910	1,756	−5.7%
1923	1,684	−4.1%
1934	1,611	−4.3%
1939	1,576	−2.2%
1951	1,350	−14.3%
1961	1,203	−10.9%
1971	1,071	−11.0%
1981	948	−11.5%
1991	944	−0.4%
2001	873	−7.5%
2011	887	+1.6%
