= Neckenmarkt =

- Municipality
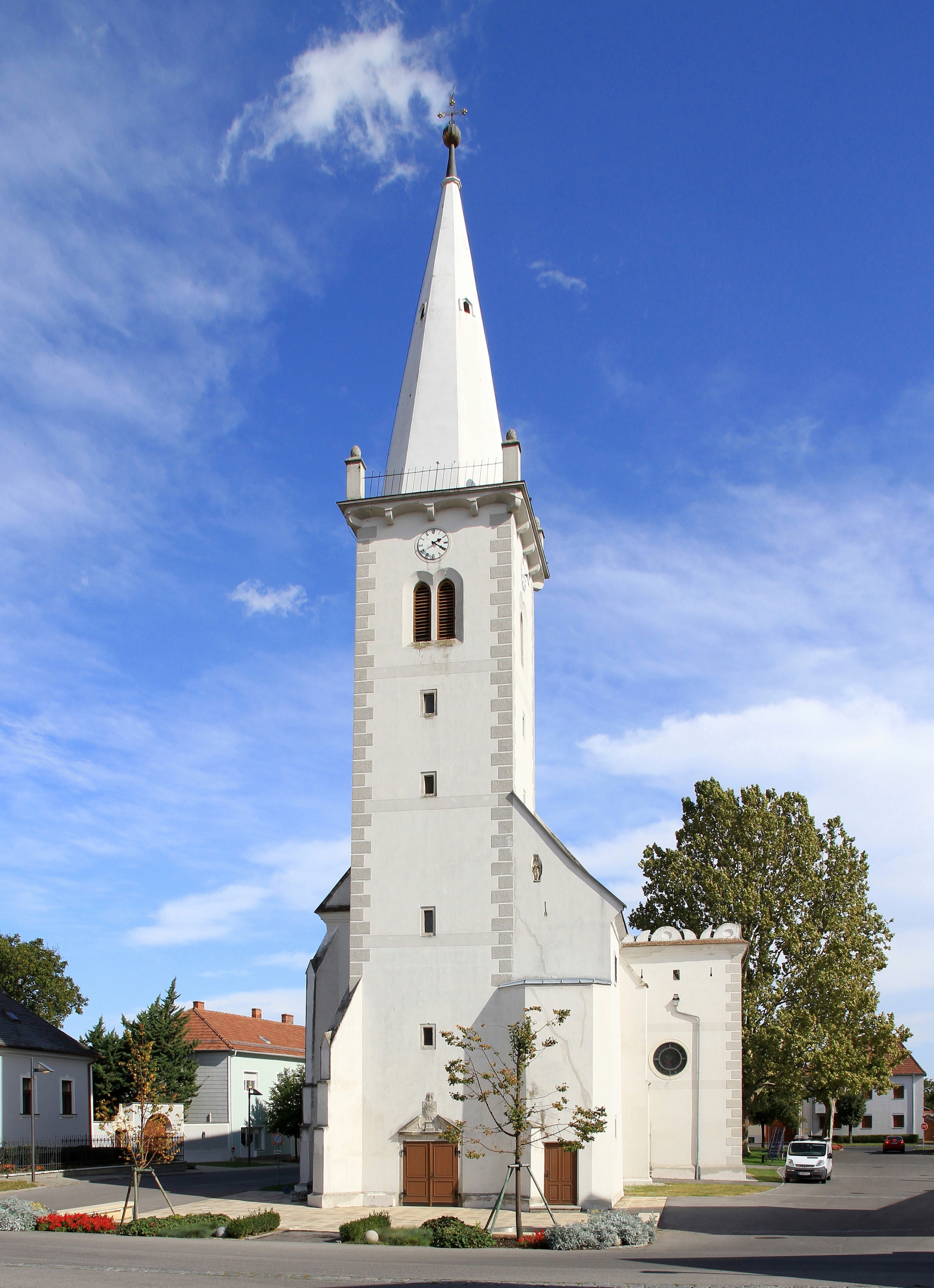
- Holy Spirit Church

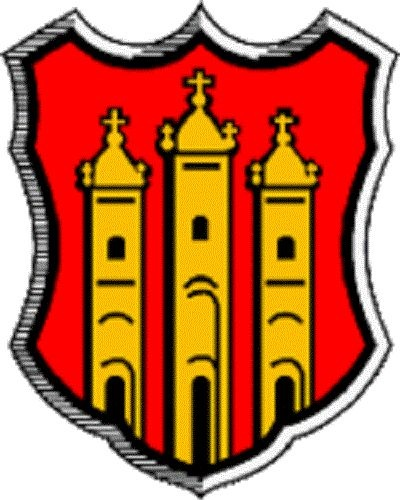
- Coat of arms

- Location within Austria
- Coordinates: 47°34′N 16°26′E
- Country: Austria
- State: Burgenland
- District: Oberpullendorf

Government
  - Mayor: Hannes Igler (ÖVP)

Area
  - Total: 26.92 km^{2} (10.39 sq mi)

Population (2018-01-01)
  - Total: 1,680
  - Density: 62.4/km^{2} (162/sq mi)
- Time zone: UTC+1 (CET)
  - Summer (DST): UTC+2 (CEST)
- Postal code: 7311

Neckenmarkt (Croatian: Lekindrof, Hungarian: Sopronnyék) is a town in the district of Oberpullendorf in the Austrian state of Burgenland.

== Population ==
Historical population
| Year | Pop. | ±% |
|---|---|---|
| 1869 | 1,811 | — |
| 1880 | 1,925 | +6.3% |
| 1890 | 1,930 | +0.3% |
| 1900 | 1,932 | +0.1% |
| 1910 | 2,011 | +4.1% |
| 1923 | 2,092 | +4.0% |
| 1934 | 2,051 | −2.0% |
| 1939 | 2,039 | −0.6% |
| 1951 | 1,921 | −5.8% |
| 1961 | 1,892 | −1.5% |
| 1971 | 1,837 | −2.9% |
| 1981 | 1,802 | −1.9% |
| 1991 | 1,785 | −0.9% |
| 2001 | 1,721 | −3.6% |
| 2011 | 1,692 | −1.7% |
