= Liebing, Austria =

Liebing Rendek
- Village
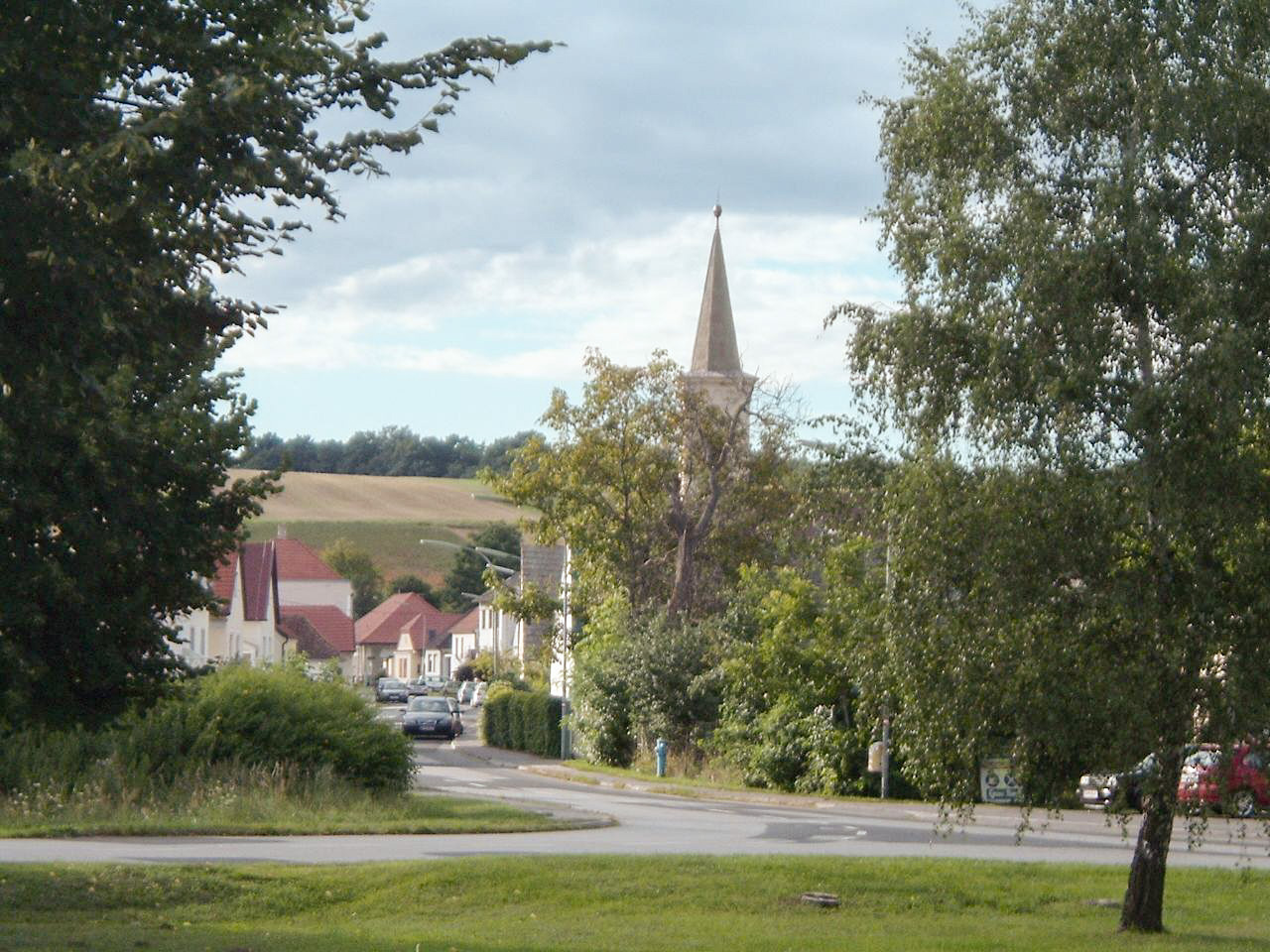
- Liebing

- Map showing Liebing on the Austro-Hungarian frontier.
- Coordinates: 47°25′N 16°30′E
- Country: Austria
- State (Land): Burgenland
- District (Bezirk): Oberpullendorf
- Municipality (Gemeinde): Mannersdorf an der Rabnitz
- First mention: 1390

Area
  - Total: 7.97 km^{2} (3.08 sq mi)
- Elevation: 921 m (3,022 ft)

Population (Census 2001)
  - Total: 234
  - Density: 29.35/km^{2} (76.0/sq mi)
- Time zone: UTC+1 (CET)
  - Summer (DST): UTC+2 (CEST)
- Postcode: 7443 Liebing
- Area code: +43 (0) 2611
- Website: www.mannersdorf-adr.at

Liebing (Hungarian Rendek) is a village in the district of Oberpullendorf in Burgenland in Austria. It is part of the municipality of Mannersdorf an der Rabnitz.

== Location ==
Liebing lies 6 km West of Kőszeg and 7 km East of Lockenhaus.

== History ==
The town was the site of iron smelting from the ancient times; the name of the town originates from the Slavic word for 'ironworker', rednek. The first written mention in the form Lennek comes from a document by Emperor Sigismund dated 1390. The town belonged to the estate of Lockenhaus castle. It was destroyed by the Ottomans in 1529 and 1532, but it was subsequently rebuilt.

In 1910, the town had a population of 310, most of whom were German speakers. Until the end of World War I, it belonged in the Kőszeg district of Vas county within the Kingdom of Hungary. Rendek was transferred to Austria in return for the town of Ólmod in 1923 subsequent to the Treaties of Saint-Germain and Trianon.

== Main Sights ==
- Roman Catholic church (1762)
- The thickest chestnut tree in Austria dating from the time of Maria Theresia, its diameter is estimated to be 10m and its age 350 years.
