= Horitschon =

- Municipality
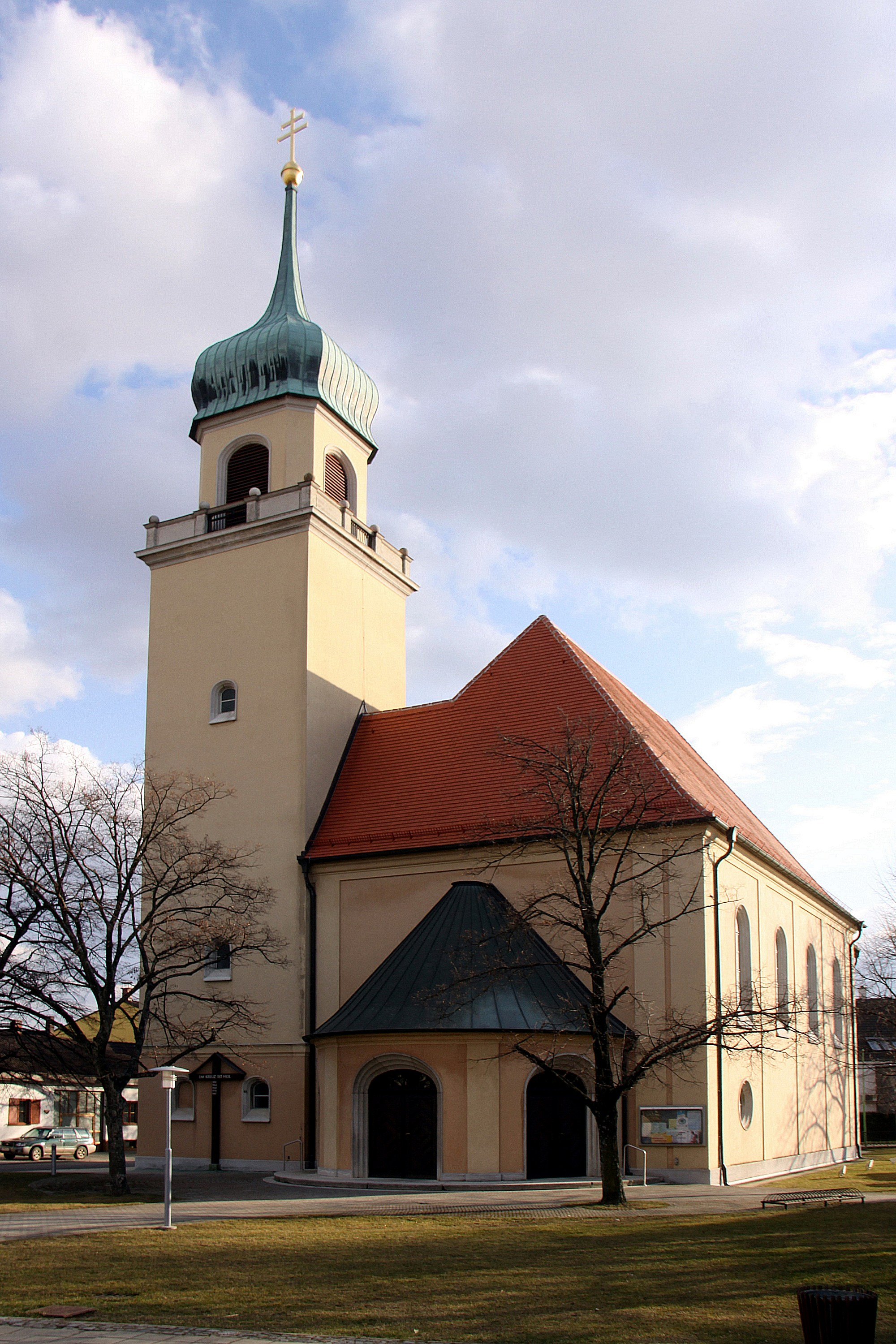
- Saint Margaret Church

- Coat of arms

- Location within Austria
- Coordinates: 47°35′N 16°33′E
- Country: Austria
- State: Burgenland
- District: Oberpullendorf

Government
  - Mayor: Gerhard Petschowitsch (SPÖ)

Area
  - Total: 18.73 km^{2} (7.23 sq mi)
- Elevation: 239 m (784 ft)

Population (2018-01-01)
  - Total: 1,861
  - Density: 99.36/km^{2} (257.3/sq mi)
- Time zone: UTC+1 (CET)
  - Summer (DST): UTC+2 (CEST)
- Postal code: 7312
- Website: www.horitschon.at

Horitschon (German pronunciation: [ˈhɔʁɪt͡ʃɔn]; Croatian: Haračun, Hungarian: Haracsony) is a town in the district of Oberpullendorf in the Austrian state of Burgenland. One of five Hungarian consulates at Austria is placed here.

== Population ==
Historical population
Year	Pop.	±%
1869	1,104	—
1880	1,173	+6.2%
1890	1,323	+12.8%
1900	1,382	+4.5%
1910	1,477	+6.9%
1923	1,494	+1.2%
1934	1,569	+5.0%
1939	1,624	+3.5%
1951	1,715	+5.6%
1961	1,820	+6.1%
1971	1,821	+0.1%
1981	1,878	+3.1%
1991	2,039	+8.6%
2001	2,008	−1.5%
2011	1,855	−7.6%
