= L'Isle-d'Abeau =

L'Isle-d'Abeau L'Ila-d'Âbél (Arpitan)
- Commune
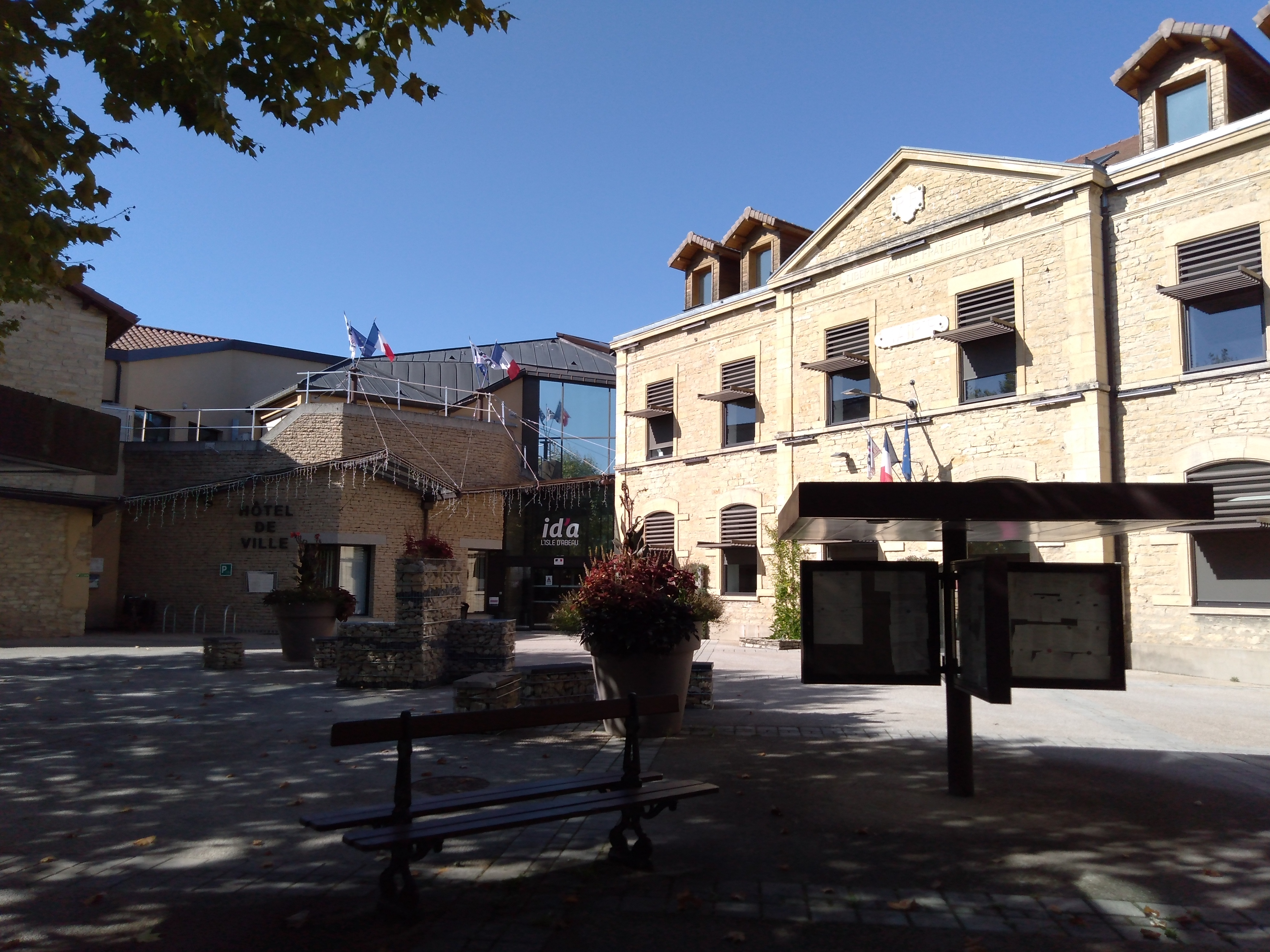
- L'Isle-d'Abeau Town Hall

- Coat of arms
- Location of L'Isle-d'Abeau
- Location within France Location within Auvergne-Rhône-Alpes
- Coordinates: 45°37′24″N 5°13′50″E
- Country: France
- Region: Auvergne-Rhône-Alpes
- Department: Isère
- Arrondissement: La Tour-du-Pin
- Canton: L'Isle-d'Abeau
- Intercommunality: CA Porte de l'Isère

Government
  - Mayor (2020–2026): Cyril Marion
- Area^{1}: 9.11 km^{2} (3.52 sq mi)
- Population (2023): 17,515
  - Density: 1,920/km^{2} (4,980/sq mi)
- Time zone: UTC+01:00 (CET)
  - Summer (DST): UTC+02:00 (CEST)
- INSEE/Postal code: 38193 /38080
- ^{1} French Land Register data, which excludes lakes, ponds, glaciers > 1 km^{2} (0.386 sq mi or 247 acres) and river estuaries.

L'Isle-d'Abeau (French pronunciation: [lil dabo]; Arpitan: L'Ila-d'Âbél) is a commune in the Isère department in the Auvergne-Rhône-Alpes region in Southeastern France. It lies 35 kilometres (21.7 miles) southeast of Lyon. It is part of the urban unit (agglomeration) of Bourgoin-Jallieu, as well as of the larger functional area of Lyon.

== Urban development ==
The new town of L'Isle-d'Abeau was developed from 1970 to canalise the demographic growth of the Lyon agglomeration. It is organised in a New Agglomeration Union, together with the neighbouring communes of Four, Saint-Quentin-Fallavier, Vaulx-Milieu and Villefontaine. Since 1 January 2007, the Union became the Communauté d'agglomération Porte de l'Isère, with over 106,000 inhabitants in 22 communes.

The commune has eight primary schools (one is private), three middle schools, one high school, in addition to two IUT facilities dedicated to informatic and multimedia jobs. It is served by the A43 autoroute and L'Isle-d'Abeau station on the line from Lyon-Perrache station to Marseille-Saint-Charles station via Grenoble, operated by the SNCF.

== Demographics ==
Historical population
Year	Pop.	±% p.a.
1968	725	—
1975	897	+3.09%
1982	1,290	+5.33%
1990	5,554	+20.02%
1999	12,034	+8.97%
2007	15,501	+3.22%
2012	15,944	+0.57%
2017	16,124	+0.22%
2023	17,515	+1.39%
Source: INSEE

== International relations ==
L'Isle-d'Abeau is twinned with:

- San Vicente del Raspeig (Alicante, Spain)

== See also ==
- Communes of the Isère department
