= Badinières =

Commune in Isère, France

- Part of Eclose-Badinières
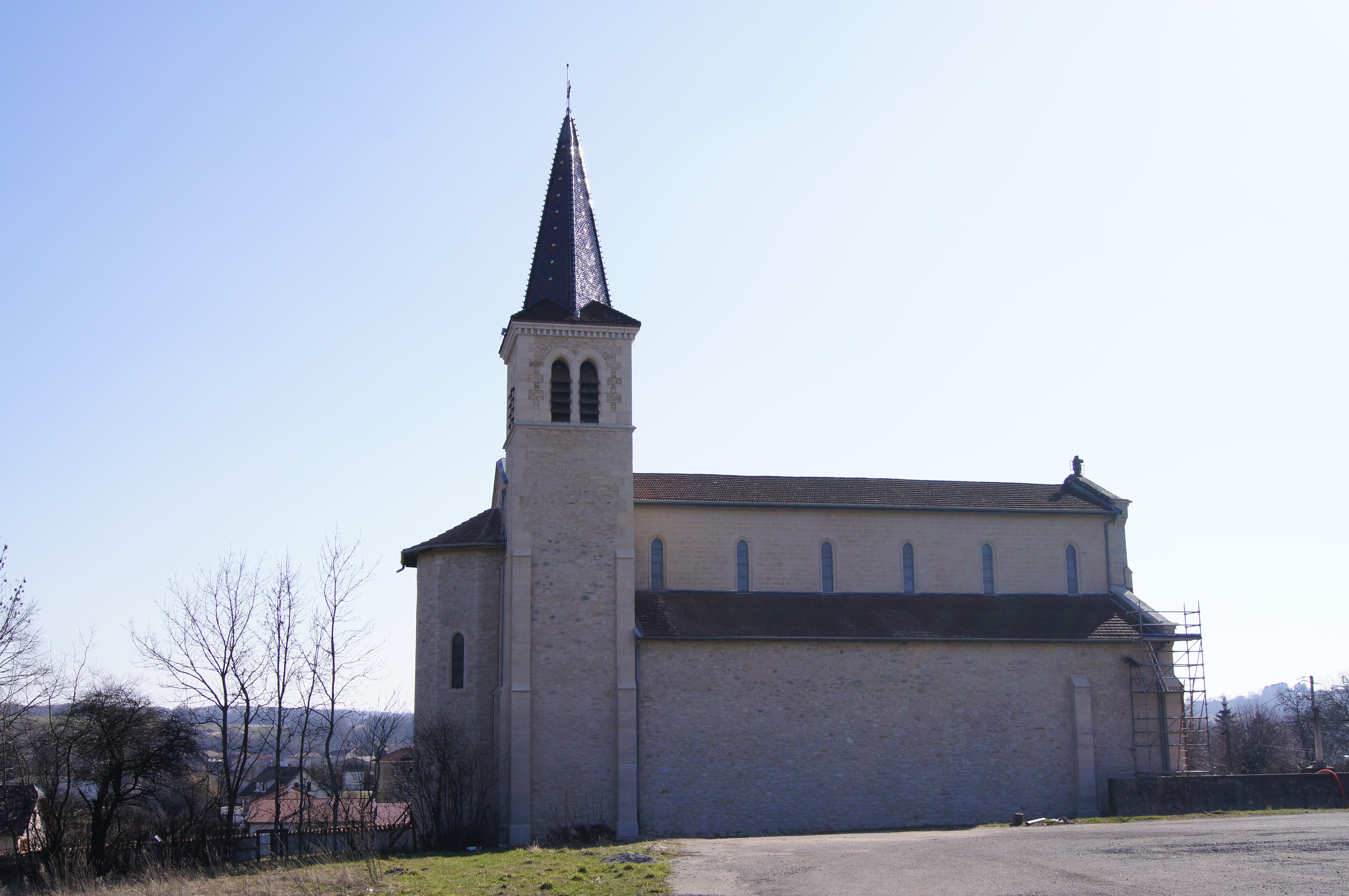
- Location of Badinières
- Location within France Location within Auvergne-Rhône-Alpes
- Coordinates: 45°30′36″N 5°18′11″E
- Country: France
- Region: Auvergne-Rhône-Alpes
- Department: Isère
- Arrondissement: La Tour-du-Pin
- Canton: Bourgoin-Jallieu-Sud
- Commune: Eclose-Badinières
- Area^{1}: 5.99 km^{2} (2.31 sq mi)
- Highest elevation: 550 m (1,800 ft)
- Lowest elevation: 396 m (1,299 ft)
- Population (2017): 681
  - Density: 114/km^{2} (294/sq mi)
- Time zone: UTC+01:00 (CET)
  - Summer (DST): UTC+02:00 (CEST)
- Postal code: 38300
- ^{1} French Land Register data, which excludes lakes, ponds, glaciers > 1 km^{2} (0.386 sq mi or 247 acres) and river estuaries.

Badinières (French pronunciation: [badinjɛʁ]) is a former commune in the Isère department in the Rhône-Alpes region of south-eastern France. In January 2015 it merged with Eclose, forming the new commune Eclose-Badinières.

== Geography ==
Badinières is located some 45 km south-east of Lyon and 10 km south of Bourgoin-Jallieu. Access to the commune is by the D1085 road from Bourgoin-Jallieu in the north which passes through the heart of the commune and the village before continuing south to Eclose. Apart from some forest along the eastern border the commune is entirely farmland.

The Agny river forms the north-western border of the commune as it flows north-east to join the Bourbre in Nivolas-Vermelle. The Ruisseau de Barthgolomat rises north of the village and flows north-west to join the Agny on the northern border of the commune.

== History ==
The commune was created in 1857 from the commune of Les Éparres.

There were Agricultural Shows in 1991 and on 26–27 August 2006.

== Administration ==
List of Successive Mayors

From	To	Name	Party	Position
1983	1995	Robert Porcher		
2001	2015	Alain Berger		

== Demography ==
The inhabitants of the commune are known as Badiniérois or Badiniéroises in French.

Historical population

Year	Pop.	±% p.a.
1861	477	—
1866	507	+1.23%
1872	467	−1.36%
1876	424	−2.39%
1881	429	+0.23%
1886	406	−1.10%
1891	428	+1.06%
1896	406	−1.05%
1901	391	−0.75%
1906	376	−0.78%
1911	357	−1.03%
1921	313	−1.31%
1926	335	+1.37%

Year	Pop.	±% p.a.
1931	320	−0.91%
1936	312	−0.51%
1946	304	−0.26%
1954	298	−0.25%
1962	303	+0.21%
1968	302	−0.06%
1975	309	+0.33%
1982	299	−0.47%
1990	364	+2.49%
1999	418	+1.55%
2007	556	+3.63%
2012	610	+1.87%
2017	681	+2.23%

Source: EHESS and INSEE

== Sites and monuments ==
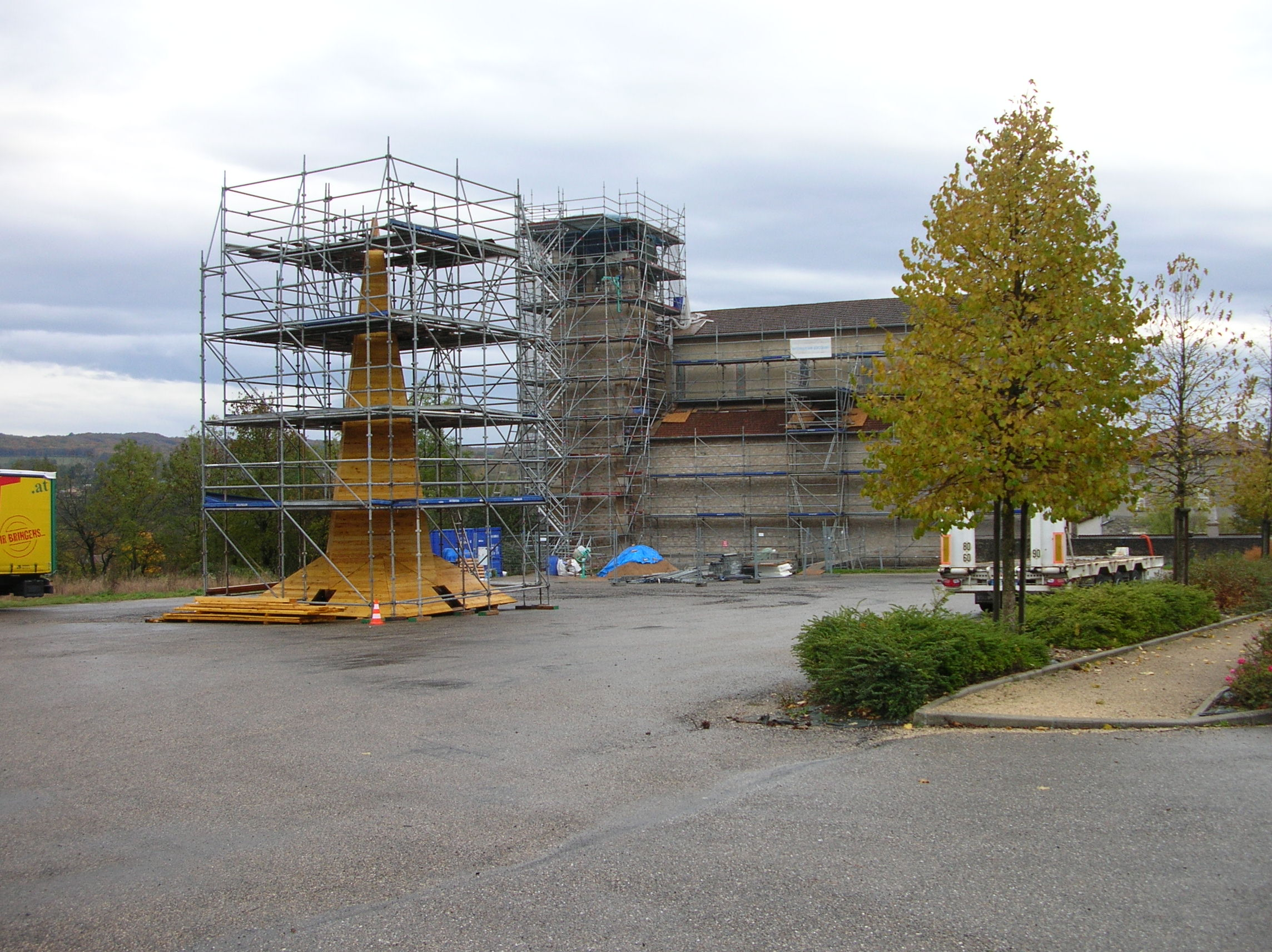
Renovation of the church in 2010

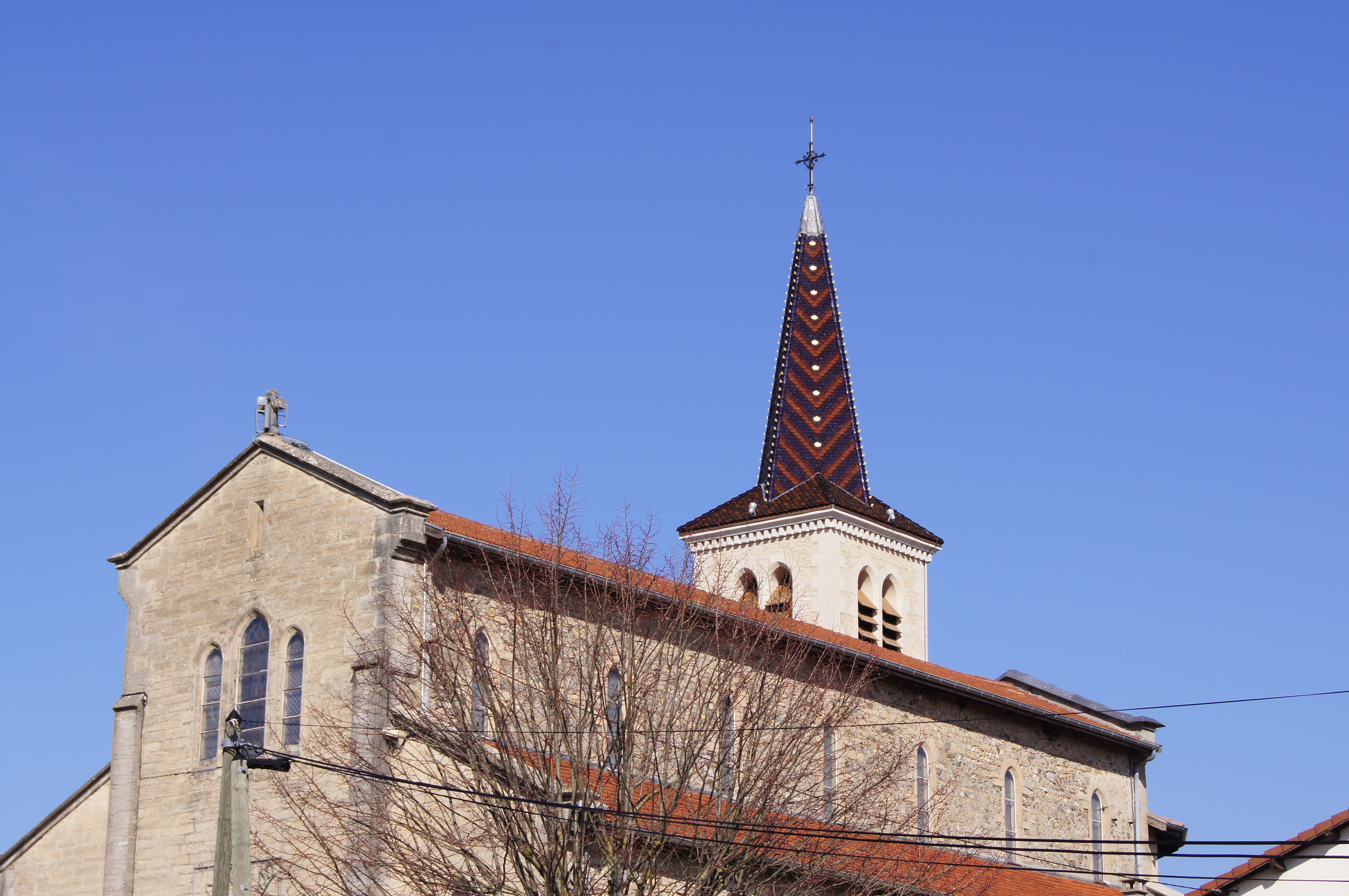
The Bell tower after renovation in 2011

- A Church from the 19th century
