= Lagrivea =

Lagrivea Temporal range: Middle Miocene (MN 7/8)

Scientific classification
- Kingdom: Animalia
- Phylum: Chordata
- Class: Mammalia
- Order: Rodentia
- Family: Sciuridae
- Genus: †Lagrivea; Mein and Ginsburg, 2002
- Species: †L. vireti

Binomial name
- †Lagrivea vireti Mein and Ginsburg, 2002

Extinct genus of squirrels

Lagrivea is a fossil genus of squirrel from the Middle Miocene of France. The single species, L. vireti, is known from three mandibles (lower jaws) and two isolated teeth. All come from the fissure filling (a fossil deposit formed when a rock fissure filled with sediment) of La Grive L5, part of the La Grive-Saint-Alban complex in Saint-Alban-de-Roche, southeastern France. Lagrivea was a large tree squirrel with flat lower incisors and a large, triangular fourth lower premolar (p4). Each of the four cheekteeth (p4 and three molars, m1 through m3) bears a deep basin in the middle of the crown. The m3 is about rectangular in shape, but rounded at the back. Although m1 and m2 have two roots, m3 has three.

== Taxonomy ==
Pierre Mein and Léonard Ginsburg described Lagrivea vireti in 2002 in a review of the ages and faunas of the Miocene fossil sites of La Grive-Saint-Alban in southeastern France. They suggested that it was probably a tree squirrel and related to the Sciurini. Lagrivea belongs to the squirrel family (Sciuridae), which first appears in the Late Eocene of North America and Early Oligocene of Europe. The specific name, vireti, honors Jean Viret for his work on the mammals of La Grive-Saint-Alban.

== Description ==
Measurements
Variable	Measurements (in mm)
Depth of mandible at m1	8.5, 8.7, 9.2
Diastema between incisors and p4	6.1, 6.9, 7.6
p4–m3	11.1, 12.2, 12.2
Length of p4	2.37, 2.42
Width of p4	2.45, 2.45
Length of m1	2.55, 2.60, 2.66
Width of m1	2.68, 2.70, 2.75
Length of m2	2.8, 3.03, 3.07
Width of m2	2.90, 3.05, 3.18
Length of m3	3.22
Width of m3	2.75

Lagrivea is known from three mandibles (lower jaws)—one, the holotype, with the fourth premolar (p4) and all three molars (m1–3) preserved; one with the incisor and m2; and one with the incisor, p4, m1, and m2—an isolated lower incisor, and an isolated m2. It was large for a squirrel, and can be distinguished from the fossil squirrels Palaeosciurus, Aliveria, and Ratufa obtusidens by its larger size.

In the mandible, the diastema (gap) between the incisors and the cheekteeth (premolars and molars) is relatively deep. The mental foramen (an opening in the bone) is located relatively high and before the p4. The upper and lower masseteric ridges, which are located on the outer side of the jaw and anchor some of the chewing muscles, meet at the m1. The surfaces of the incisor are very flat, but there are small, irregular striations in the enamel along the length of the tooth.

The cheekteeth increase regularly in size from front to back. They all consist of a large central basin surrounded by cusps and crests. The basins are deeper than in Palaeosciurus and Ratufa obtusidens and lack crenulations in the enamel, which distinguishes them from another fossil squirrel, Albanensia. The first cheekteeth, p4, is large and about triangular in form, short and quite broad at the back. The two cusps at the front, the protoconid and metaconid, are isolated from each other. In front of the metaconid, there is a small cuspule, an anteroconid, at the lingual side of the tooth (the side of the tongue). The central basin of the tooth is relatively deep. At the back of the tooth, the entoconid cusp is connected to the posterolophid, a crest that forms the back margin. Of the two roots, the one at the front is round and the one at the back is broad.

Although m1 is nearly rectangular, the width at the front is still smaller than the width at the back. There is a strong anteroconid. A crest, the metalophid, reaches from the protoconid nearly to the metaconid. A small cusp, the mesostylid, is connected to the metaconid in front of it, unlike in Miopetaurista and Aliveria. There are two broad roots. The next tooth, m2, is similar to m1 in most respects, but the width at the front is virtually equal to the width at the back, so that the tooth is about rectangular. The back of m3 is rounded, but the tooth is still nearly rectangular. There is a long anteroconid, which is mainly connected to the metaconid. There is no metalophid. This tooth has three roots: two at the front and a larger one at the back.

== Range and context ==
The remains of Lagrivea were probably collected by Viret at the site La Grive L5 in the village of Saint-Alban-de-Roche, department of Isère, southeastern France. La Grive L5 is one of several fissure filling sites in the area, collectively known as La Grive-Saint-Alban, which have yielded rich fossil faunas. Another site, La Grive M, is the reference locality for the MN zone MN 7/8, about 13 to 11 million years ago. La Grive L5 is one of the younger sites of La Grive, and Mein and Ginsburg proposed placing it in a separate zone MN 8. Other squirrels at La Grive-Saint-Alban include species of Heteroxerus, Spermophilinus, Palaeosciurus, and chipmunks, and flying squirrels in the genera Albanensia, Miopetaurista, Forsythia, Hylopetes, and Blackia. Miopetaurista neogrivensis, Spermophilinus bredai, and Heteroxerus huerzeleri are also known from La Grive L5. In 2012, Ginsburg and Mein described an indeterminate squirrel from the older (MN 6) site of Sansan, France, on the basis of a single p4. This tooth is similar in size to Lagrivea, but differs in a narrower talonid.

== Literature cited ==
- Ginsburg, L. and Mein, P. 2012. Les Sciuridae (Rodentia) de Sansan. Mémoires du Muséum national d'Histoire naturelle 203:81–94.
- McKenna, M.C. and Bell, S.K. 1997. Classification of Mammals: Above the species level. New York: Columbia University Press, 631 pp. ISBN 978-0-231-11013-6
- Mein, P. and Ginsburg, L. 2002. Sur l'âge relatif des différents karstiques miocènes de La Grive-Saint-Alban (Isère). Cahiers scientifiques, Muséum d'Histoire naturelle, Lyon 2:7–47 (in French).
- Steininger, F. 1999. Chronostratigraphy, geochronology and biochronology of the Miocene "European Land Mammal Mega-Zones (ELMMZ)" and the Miocene "Mammal Zones (MN-Zones)". Pp. 9–24 in Rössner, G.E. and Heissig, K. (eds.). The Miocene Land Mammals of Europe. Munich: Verlag Dr. Friedrich Pfeil, 515 pp.
