= Eclose =

Commune in Isère, France

- Part of Eclose-Badinières
- Location of Eclose
- Location within France Location within Auvergne-Rhône-Alpes
- Coordinates: 45°29′58″N 5°18′00″E
- Country: France
- Region: Auvergne-Rhône-Alpes
- Department: Isère
- Arrondissement: La Tour-du-Pin
- Canton: Bourgoin-Jallieu
- Commune: Eclose-Badinières
- Area^{1}: 10.29 km^{2} (3.97 sq mi)
- Highest elevation: 640 m (2,100 ft)
- Lowest elevation: 478 m (1,568 ft)
- Population (2017): 753
  - Density: 73.2/km^{2} (190/sq mi)
- Time zone: UTC+01:00 (CET)
  - Summer (DST): UTC+02:00 (CEST)
- Postal code: 38300
- ^{1} French Land Register data, which excludes lakes, ponds, glaciers > 1 km^{2} (0.386 sq mi or 247 acres) and river estuaries.

Eclose (French pronunciation: [ekloz]) is a former commune in the Isère department in southeastern France. In January 2015 it merged with Badinières, forming the new commune Eclose-Badinières.

== Population ==
Historical population

| Year | Pop. | ±% p.a. |
|---|---|---|
| 1793 | 370 | — |
| 1821 | 573 | +1.57% |
| 1846 | 680 | +0.69% |
| 1872 | 730 | +0.27% |
| 1901 | 664 | −0.33% |
| 1926 | 530 | −0.90% |
| 1946 | 455 | −0.76% |
| 1962 | 449 | −0.08% |

| Year | Pop. | ±% p.a. |
|---|---|---|
| 1968 | 426 | −0.87% |
| 1975 | 495 | +2.17% |
| 1982 | 566 | +1.93% |
| 1990 | 545 | −0.47% |
| 1999 | 536 | −0.18% |
| 2006 | 698 | +3.84% |
| 2017 | 753 | +0.69% |

Source: EHESS and INSEE

== See also ==
- Communes of the Isère department
