= Sérézin =

Sérézin may refer to several communes in France:

- Sérézin-de-la-Tour, in the Isère department
- Sérézin-du-Rhône, in the Rhône department
