= La Grive-Saint-Alban =

Paleontological site in France

- Stratigraphic range: Miocene
- Type: Geological formation

Lithology
- Primary: Karstic limestone

Location
- Coordinates: 45.595397°N 5.224183°E
- Region: Auvergne-Rhône-Alpes
- Country: France

Type section
- Named for: Saint-Alban-de-Roche
- La Grive-Saint-Alban (France)

La Grive-Saint-Alban is a geomorphological karstic site located on the territory of the French commune of Saint-Alban-de-Roche, in the Isère department. This area, long exploited for its red clay, is known since the 19th century for the richness of its fossil deposits, distributed from the Bathonian stage to the Miocene.

== Description ==
La Grive-Saint-Alban is a karstic fracture caused by the hydrochemical and hydraulic erosion of carbonate rock formations, mostly limestone.

The geological layers shows a succession of argillaceous strata, from red clay to silt in an environment composed of marl and limestone.

Changes in the fossil composition are shown across the various layers, which indicates that the deposit happened in several stages. Various changes affected the European mammalian fauna during the Miocene (−25 to −5 Ma), caused by an important climate change leading Europe towards a temperate climate.

Several members are distinguished, named D, M1, M2, L3, L5 and L7, providing various species buried during different periods.

The fauna is diverse, with skeletal remains, jaws, molars and skeletons of carnivores, insectivores, rodents and ungulates, showing the faunal diversity of the Miocene. Several species of Sciuridae, Gliridae and Cricetinae, such as Democricetodon and Heteroxerus (a flying squirrel) are similar to those of the paleontological sites of Vieux-Collonges and Sansan.

A fossil of giant squirrel discovered on this site received the name Lagrivea after La Grive-Saint-Alban.

== Bibliography ==
- Charles Depéret, La faune de mammifères miocènes de la Grive-Saint-Alban (Isère) et de quelques autres localités du bassin du Rhône : documents nouveaux et révision générale, éditions H. Georg, 1892
- Claude Gaillard, Mammifères miocènes nouveaux ou peu connus de La Grive-Saint-Alban (Isère), 1899
- Jean Viret, Catalogue critique de la faune des mammifères miocènes de La Grive Saint-Alban, 1re partie: Chiroptères, carnivores, édentés pholidotes, Muséum d'histoire naturelle de Lyon, éditions A.Rey, 1951
