= Tramolé =

- Commune
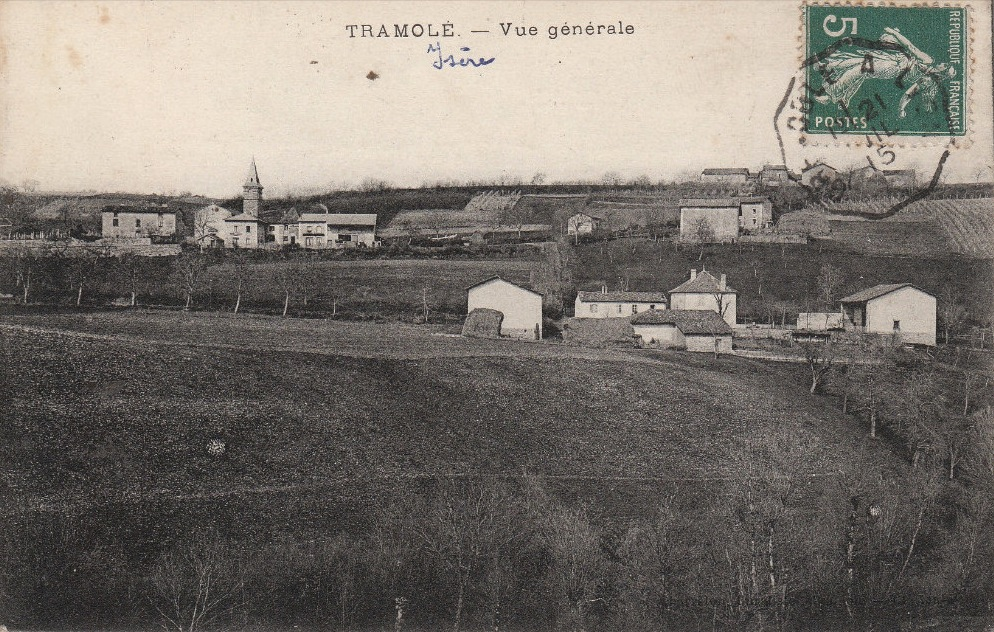
- Tramolé in 1915
- Location of Tramolé
- Location within France Location within Auvergne-Rhône-Alpes
- Coordinates: 45°31′11″N 5°16′07″E
- Country: France
- Region: Auvergne-Rhône-Alpes
- Department: Isère
- Arrondissement: Vienne
- Canton: L'Isle-d'Abeau

Government
  - Mayor (2020–2026): Jean-Michel Drevet
- Area^{1}: 6.99 km^{2} (2.70 sq mi)
- Elevation: 450 m (1,480 ft)
- Highest elevation: 538 m (1,765 ft)
- Lowest elevation: 394 m (1,293 ft)
- Population (2023): 810
  - Density: 120/km^{2} (300/sq mi)
- Time zone: UTC+01:00 (CET)
  - Summer (DST): UTC+02:00 (CEST)
- INSEE/Postal code: 38512 /38300
- ^{1} French Land Register data, which excludes lakes, ponds, glaciers > 1 km^{2} (0.386 sq mi or 247 acres) and river estuaries.

Tramolé (French pronunciation: [tʁamɔle]) is a commune in the Isère department in southeastern France.

== Population ==
Historical population
| Year | Pop. | ±% p.a. |
|---|---|---|
| 1968 | 248 | — |
| 1975 | 203 | −2.82% |
| 1982 | 279 | +4.65% |
| 1990 | 382 | +4.01% |
| 1999 | 474 | +2.43% |
| 2007 | 521 | +1.19% |
| 2012 | 542 | +0.79% |
| 2017 | 754 | +6.83% |
| 2023 | 810 | +1.20% |
Source: INSEE

== See also ==
- Communes of the Isère department
