= Domarin =

Administrative division in Auvergne-Rhône-Alpes, France

- Commune
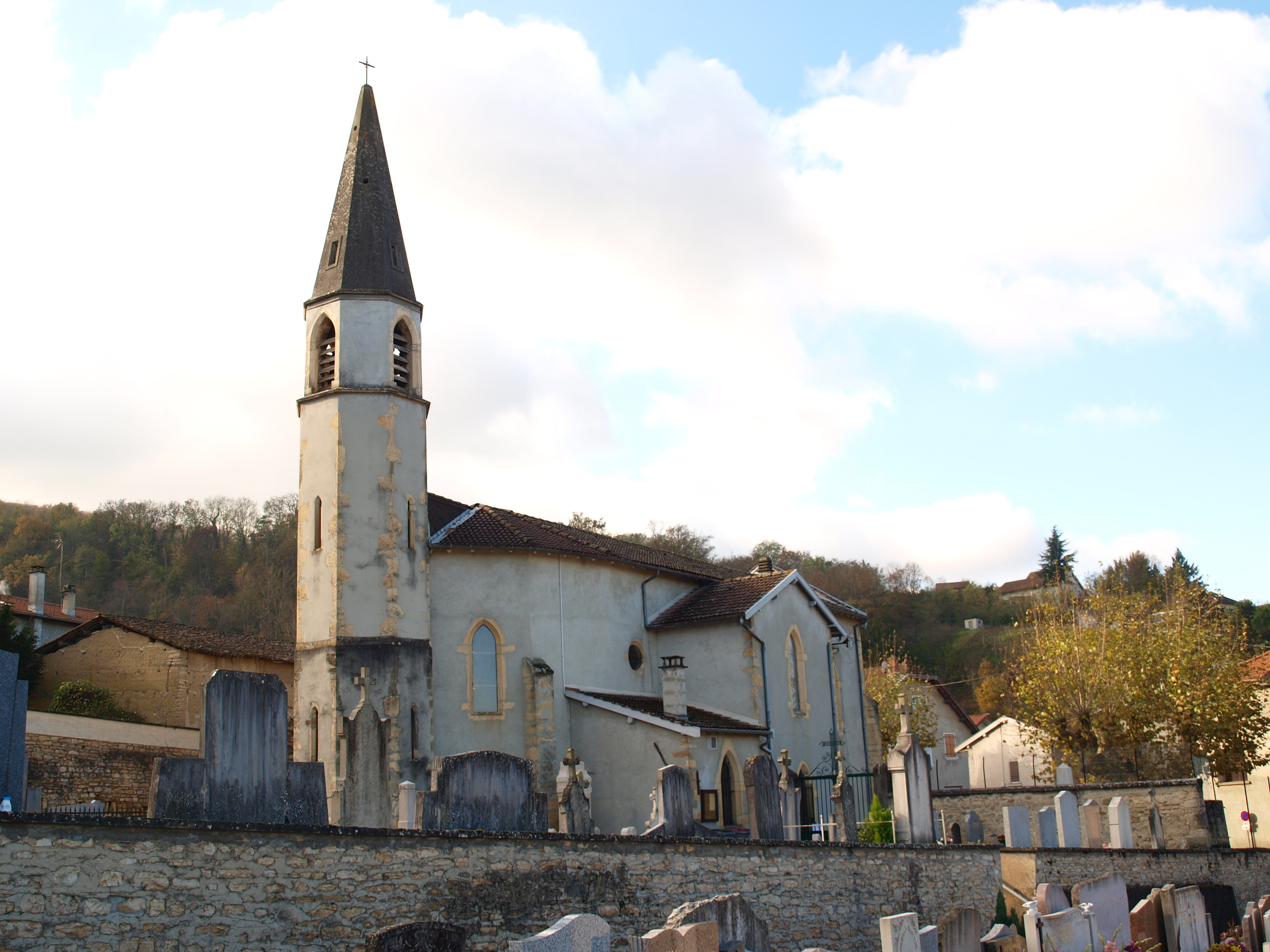
- The church of Domarin
- Location of Domarin
- Location within France Location within Auvergne-Rhône-Alpes
- Coordinates: 45°35′11″N 5°14′42″E
- Country: France
- Region: Auvergne-Rhône-Alpes
- Department: Isère
- Arrondissement: La Tour-du-Pin
- Canton: Bourgoin-Jallieu
- Intercommunality: CA Porte de l'Isère

Government
  - Mayor (2020–2026): Alain Mary
- Area^{1}: 2.99 km^{2} (1.15 sq mi)
- Highest elevation: 450 m (1,480 ft)
- Lowest elevation: 231 m (758 ft)
- Population (2023): 1,659
  - Density: 555/km^{2} (1,440/sq mi)
- Time zone: UTC+01:00 (CET)
  - Summer (DST): UTC+02:00 (CEST)
- INSEE/Postal code: 38149 /38300
- ^{1} French Land Register data, which excludes lakes, ponds, glaciers > 1 km^{2} (0.386 sq mi or 247 acres) and river estuaries.

Domarin (French pronunciation: [dɔmaʁɛ̃]) is a commune in the Isère department in southeastern France.

== Population ==
Historical population
Year	Pop.	±% p.a.
1968	610	—
1975	846	+4.78%
1982	1,253	+5.77%
1990	1,382	+1.23%
1999	1,428	+0.36%
2007	1,412	−0.14%
2012	1,431	+0.27%
2017	1,661	+3.03%
2023	1,659	−0.02%
Source: INSEE

== See also ==
- Communes of the Isère department
