= Culin, Isère =

Culin
- Commune
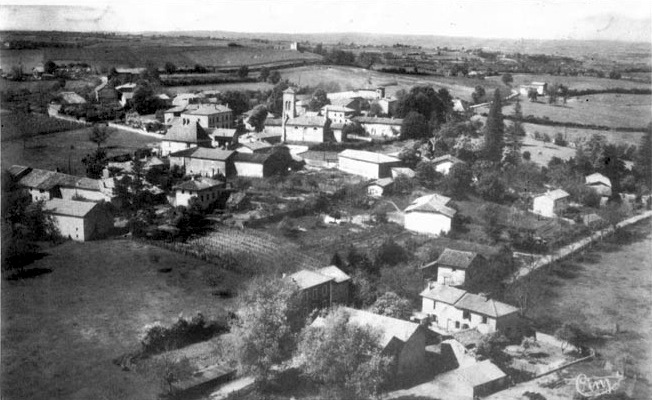
- An aerial view of Culin in 1900
- Location of Culin
- Location within France Location within Auvergne-Rhône-Alpes
- Coordinates: 45°31′30″N 5°15′10″E
- Country: France
- Region: Auvergne-Rhône-Alpes
- Department: Isère
- Arrondissement: Vienne
- Canton: L'Isle-d'Abeau
- Intercommunality: Bièvre Isère

Government
  - Mayor (2020–2026): Maurice Debrand
- Area^{1}: 7.32 km^{2} (2.83 sq mi)
- Elevation: 520 m (1,710 ft)
- Highest elevation: 536 m (1,759 ft)
- Lowest elevation: 421 m (1,381 ft)
- Population (2023): 790
  - Density: 110/km^{2} (280/sq mi)
- Time zone: UTC+01:00 (CET)
  - Summer (DST): UTC+02:00 (CEST)
- INSEE/Postal code: 38141 /38300
- ^{1} French Land Register data, which excludes lakes, ponds, glaciers > 1 km^{2} (0.386 sq mi or 247 acres) and river estuaries.

Culin (French pronunciation: [kylɛ̃]) is a commune in the Isère department in southeastern France.

== Population ==
Historical population
Year	Pop.	±% p.a.
1968	256	—
1975	251	−0.28%
1982	336	+4.25%
1990	406	+2.39%
1999	518	+2.74%
2007	626	+2.40%
2012	686	+1.85%
2017	745	+1.66%
2023	790	+0.98%
Source: INSEE

== See also ==
- Communes of the Isère department
