= Saint-Savin, Isère =

Saint-Savin
- Commune
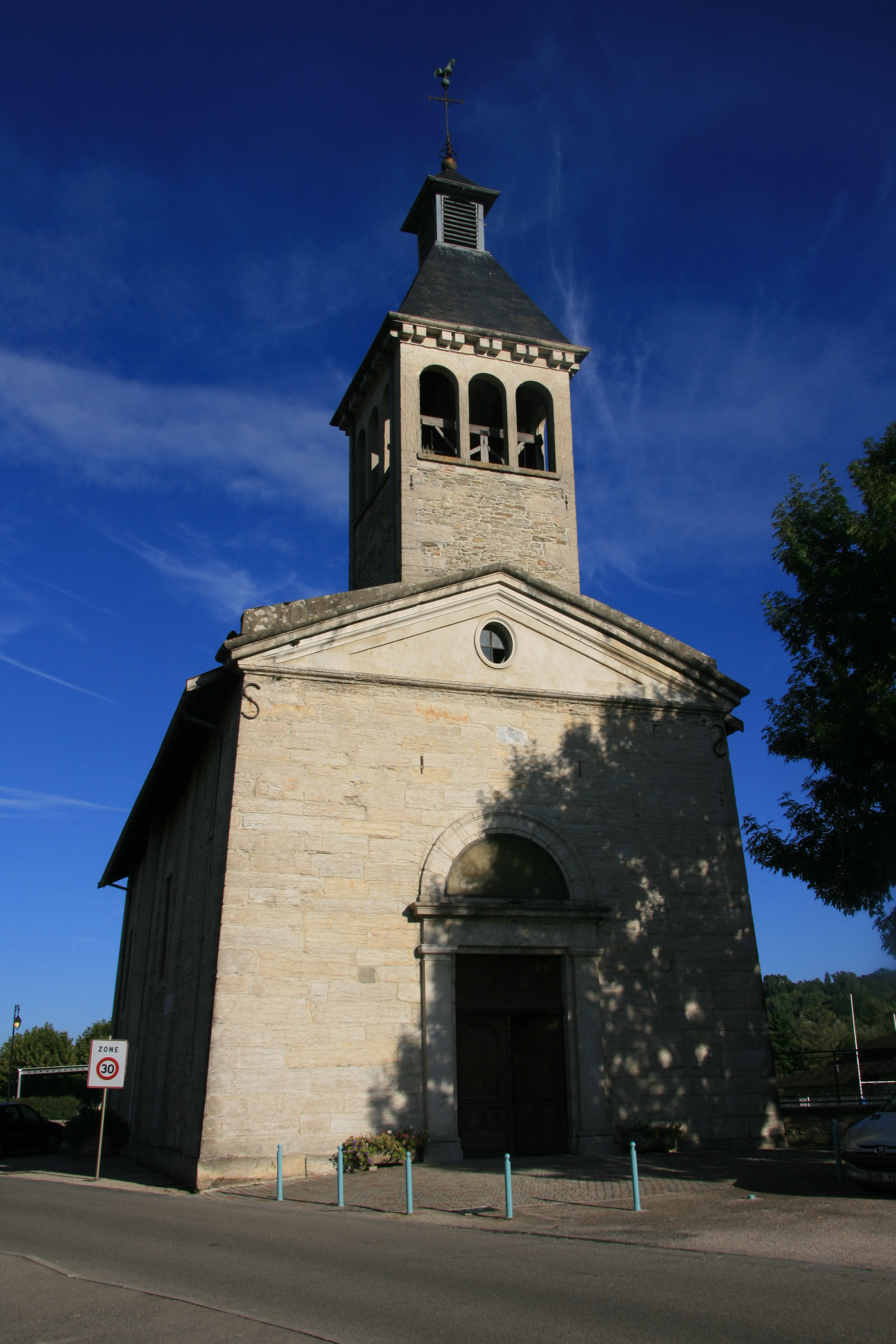
- The church of Saint-Savin

- Coat of arms
- Location of Saint-Savin
- Location within France Location within Auvergne-Rhône-Alpes
- Coordinates: 45°37′46″N 5°18′24″E
- Country: France
- Region: Auvergne-Rhône-Alpes
- Department: Isère
- Arrondissement: La Tour-du-Pin
- Canton: Bourgoin-Jallieu
- Intercommunality: CA Porte de l'Isère

Government
  - Mayor (2020–2026): Fabien Durand
- Area^{1}: 24.55 km^{2} (9.48 sq mi)
- Elevation: 250 m (820 ft)
- Highest elevation: 403 m (1,322 ft)
- Lowest elevation: 216 m (709 ft)
- Population (2023): 4,323
  - Density: 176.1/km^{2} (456.1/sq mi)
- Time zone: UTC+01:00 (CET)
  - Summer (DST): UTC+02:00 (CEST)
- INSEE/Postal code: 38455 /38300
- ^{1} French Land Register data, which excludes lakes, ponds, glaciers > 1 km^{2} (0.386 sq mi or 247 acres) and river estuaries.

Saint-Savin (French pronunciation: [sɛ̃ savɛ̃]; Arpitan: Sant-Savin) is a commune in the Isère department in southeastern France.

== Population ==
Historical population

Year	Pop.	±% p.a.
1793	1,543	—
1821	2,068	+1.05%
1846	2,434	+0.65%
1872	2,168	−0.44%
1901	1,803	−0.63%
1926	1,553	−0.60%
1946	1,513	−0.13%
1962	1,600	+0.35%
1968	1,601	+0.01%

Year	Pop.	±% p.a.
1975	1,811	+1.78%
1982	2,164	+2.58%
1990	2,466	+1.65%
1999	2,752	+1.23%
2007	3,424	+2.77%
2012	3,697	+1.55%
2017	4,076	+1.97%
2023	4,323	+0.99%

Source: EHESS and INSEE (1968-2023)

== See also ==
- Communes of the Isère department
