= Saint-Marcel-Bel-Accueil =

- Commune
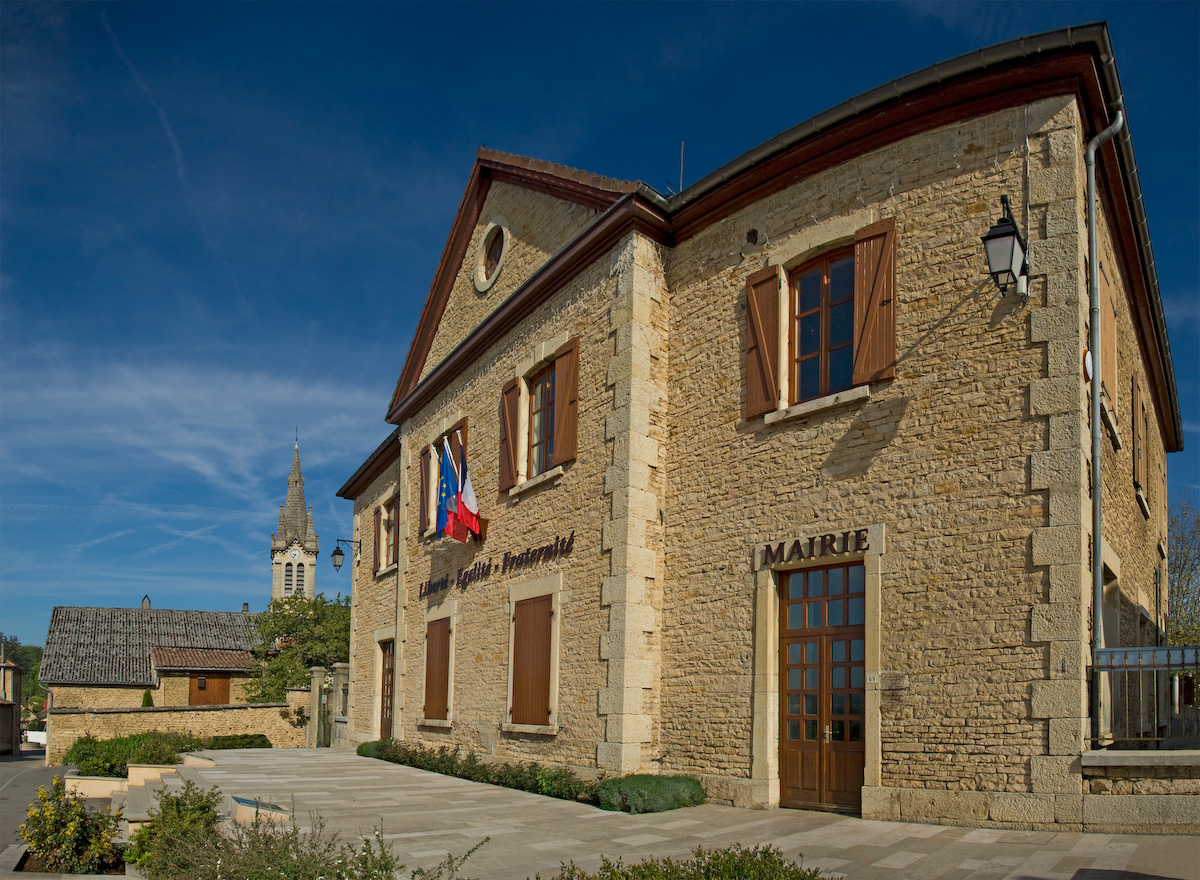
- The town hall of Saint-Marcel-Bel-Accueil
- Location of Saint-Marcel-Bel-Accueil
- Location within France Location within Auvergne-Rhône-Alpes
- Coordinates: 45°38′53″N 5°14′12″E
- Country: France
- Region: Auvergne-Rhône-Alpes
- Department: Isère
- Arrondissement: La Tour-du-Pin
- Canton: Bourgoin-Jallieu
- Intercommunality: Les Balcons du Dauphiné

Government
  - Mayor (2020–2026): Aurélien Blanc
- Area^{1}: 18.23 km^{2} (7.04 sq mi)
- Elevation: 250 m (820 ft)
- Highest elevation: 452 m (1,483 ft)
- Lowest elevation: 210 m (690 ft)
- Population (2023): 1,505
  - Density: 82.56/km^{2} (213.8/sq mi)
- Time zone: UTC+01:00 (CET)
  - Summer (DST): UTC+02:00 (CEST)
- INSEE/Postal code: 38415 /38080
- ^{1} French Land Register data, which excludes lakes, ponds, glaciers > 1 km^{2} (0.386 sq mi or 247 acres) and river estuaries.

Saint-Marcel-Bel-Accueil (French pronunciation: [sɛ̃ maʁsɛl bɛl akœj]) is a commune in the Isère department in southeastern France.

== Population ==
Historical population
Year	Pop.	±% p.a.
1968	548	—
1975	640	+2.24%
1982	804	+3.31%
1990	998	+2.74%
1999	1,254	+2.57%
2007	1,277	+0.23%
2012	1,319	+0.65%
2017	1,393	+1.10%
2023	1,505	+1.30%
Source: INSEE

== See also ==
- Communes of the Isère department
