= Ruy-Montceau =

- Commune
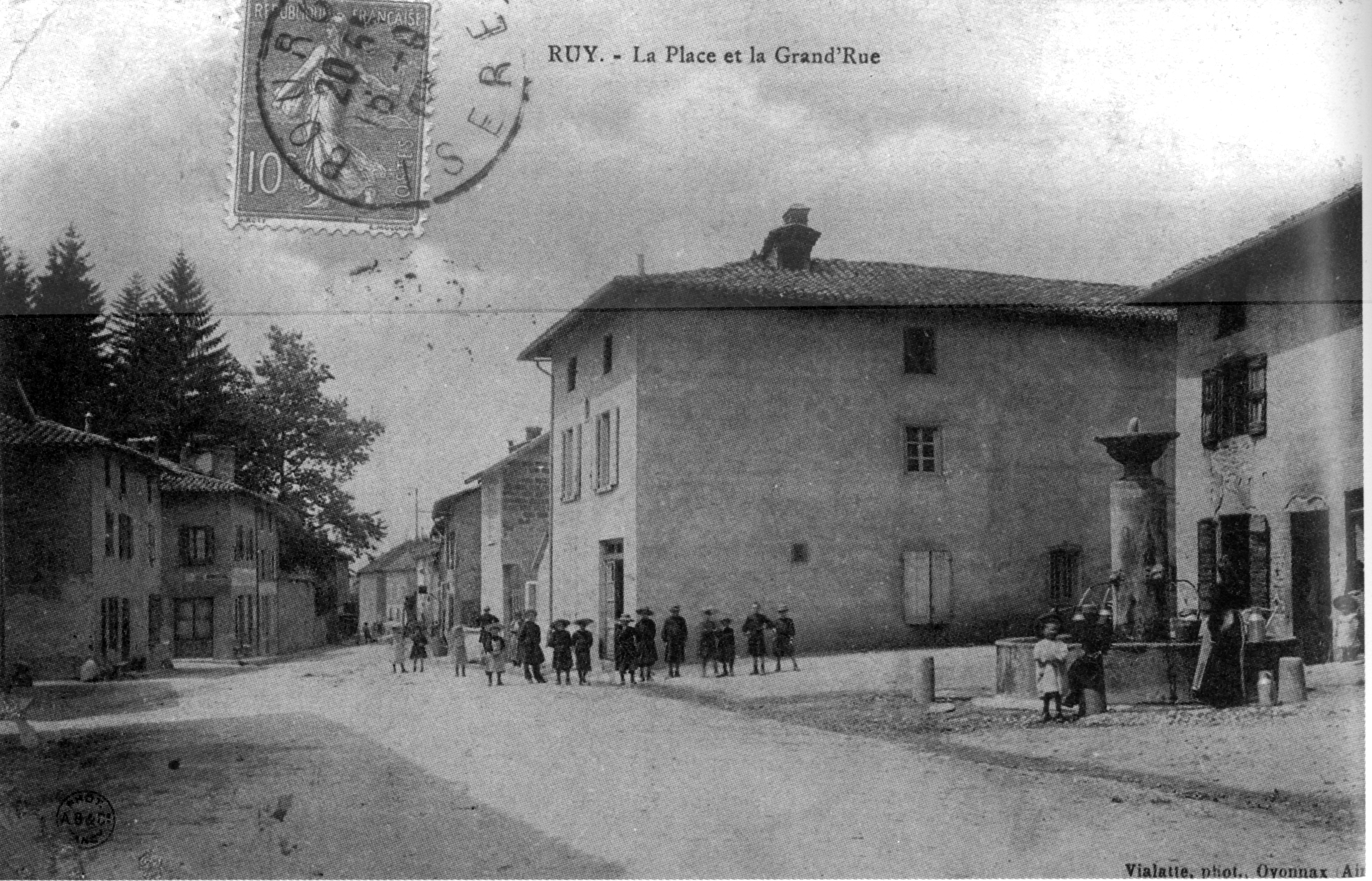
- Ruy in 1907
- Location of Ruy-Montceau
- Location within France Location within Auvergne-Rhône-Alpes
- Coordinates: 45°35′21″N 5°19′07″E
- Country: France
- Region: Auvergne-Rhône-Alpes
- Department: Isère
- Arrondissement: La Tour-du-Pin
- Canton: Bourgoin-Jallieu
- Intercommunality: CA Porte de l'Isère

Government
  - Mayor (2020–2026): Denis Giraud
- Area^{1}: 20.81 km^{2} (8.03 sq mi)
- Elevation: 260 m (850 ft)
- Highest elevation: 505 m (1,657 ft)
- Lowest elevation: 244 m (801 ft)
- Population (2023): 4,805
  - Density: 230.9/km^{2} (598.0/sq mi)
- Time zone: UTC+01:00 (CET)
  - Summer (DST): UTC+02:00 (CEST)
- INSEE/Postal code: 38348 /38300
- ^{1} French Land Register data, which excludes lakes, ponds, glaciers > 1 km^{2} (0.386 sq mi or 247 acres) and river estuaries.

Ruy-Montceau (French pronunciation: [ʁɥi mɔ̃so]; before August 2015: Ruy) is a commune in the Isère department in southeastern France.

== Geography ==
The Bourbre forms most of the commune's southwestern border.

== Population ==
Population data before 1972 refer to the former commune of Ruy, before the merger with Montceau.

Historical population

Year	Pop.	±% p.a.
1793	993	—
1800	947	−0.68%
1806	1,035	+1.49%
1821	1,237	+1.20%
1831	1,278	+0.33%
1836	1,322	+0.68%
1841	1,367	+0.67%
1846	1,331	−0.53%
1851	1,381	+0.74%
1856	1,429	+0.69%
1861	1,396	−0.47%
1866	1,462	+0.93%
1872	1,411	−0.59%
1876	1,320	−1.65%
1881	1,300	−0.30%
1886	1,326	+0.40%
1891	1,329	+0.05%
1896	1,444	+1.67%
1901	1,455	+0.15%

Year	Pop.	±% p.a.
1906	1,413	−0.58%
1911	1,339	−1.07%
1921	1,279	−0.46%
1926	1,382	+1.56%
1931	1,514	+1.84%
1936	1,345	−2.34%
1946	1,280	−0.49%
1954	1,340	+0.57%
1962	1,402	+0.57%
1968	1,526	+1.42%
1975	2,184	+5.25%
1982	2,619	+2.63%
1990	3,143	+2.31%
1999	3,762	+2.02%
2007	4,030	+0.86%
2012	4,282	+1.22%
2017	4,529	+1.13%
2023	4,805	+0.99%

Source: EHESS and INSEE (1968-2023)

== See also ==
- Communes of the Isère department
