= Crachier =

- Commune
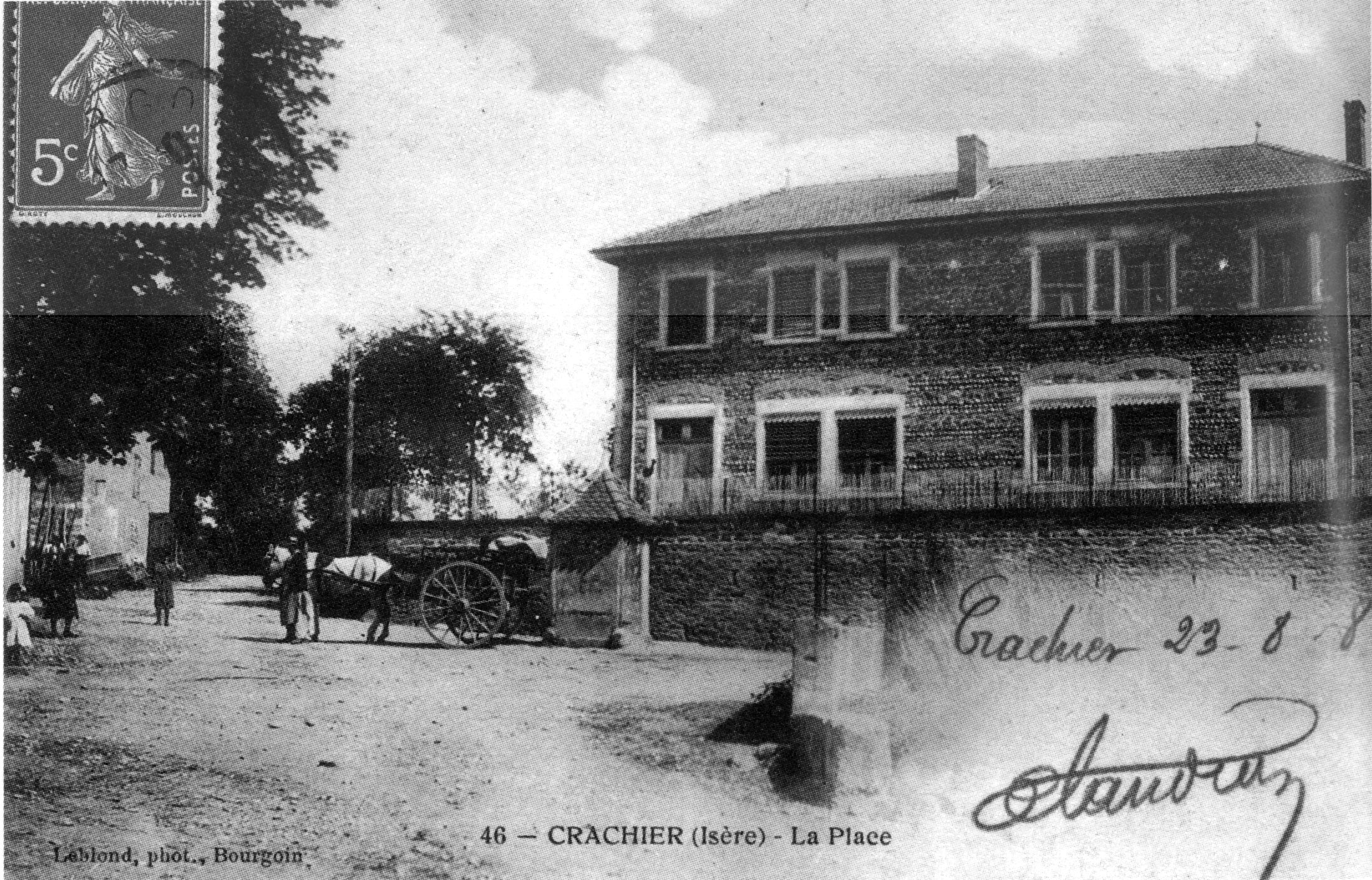
- Crachier in 1908
- Location of Crachier
- Location within France Location within Auvergne-Rhône-Alpes
- Coordinates: 45°32′57″N 5°13′35″E
- Country: France
- Region: Auvergne-Rhône-Alpes
- Department: Isère
- Arrondissement: La Tour-du-Pin
- Canton: L'Isle-d'Abeau
- Intercommunality: CA Porte de l'Isère

Government
  - Mayor (2020–2026): Nadine Roy
- Area^{1}: 3.64 km^{2} (1.41 sq mi)
- Highest elevation: 462 m (1,516 ft)
- Lowest elevation: 370 m (1,210 ft)
- Population (2023): 600
  - Density: 160/km^{2} (430/sq mi)
- Time zone: UTC+01:00 (CET)
  - Summer (DST): UTC+02:00 (CEST)
- INSEE/Postal code: 38136 /38300
- ^{1} French Land Register data, which excludes lakes, ponds, glaciers > 1 km^{2} (0.386 sq mi or 247 acres) and river estuaries.

Crachier (French pronunciation: [kʁaʃje]) is a commune in the Isère department in southeastern France.

== Population ==
Historical population
Year	Pop.	±% p.a.
1968	208	—
1975	258	+3.13%
1982	286	+1.48%
1990	334	+1.96%
1999	432	+2.90%
2007	458	+0.73%
2012	474	+0.69%
2017	508	+1.40%
2023	600	+2.81%
Source: INSEE

== See also ==
- Communes of the Isère department
