= Saint-Agnin-sur-Bion =

- Commune
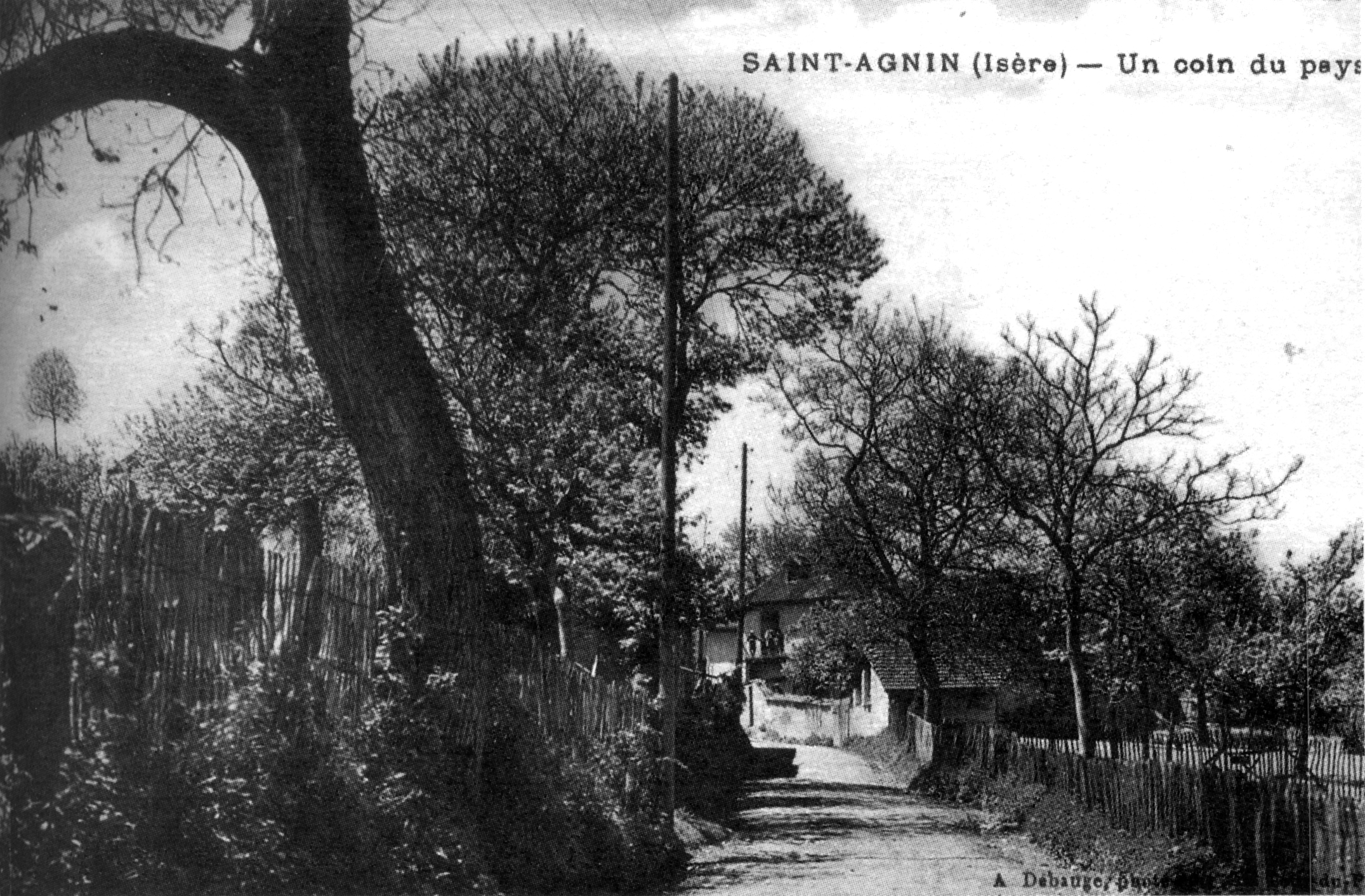
- Saint-Agnin-sur-Bion in 1912
- Location of Saint-Agnin-sur-Bion
- Location within France Location within Auvergne-Rhône-Alpes
- Coordinates: 45°32′28″N 5°14′42″E
- Country: France
- Region: Auvergne-Rhône-Alpes
- Department: Isère
- Arrondissement: Vienne
- Canton: L'Isle-d'Abeau

Government
  - Mayor (2024–2026): Pascal Armanet
- Area^{1}: 9.7 km^{2} (3.7 sq mi)
- Elevation: 435 m (1,427 ft)
- Highest elevation: 503 m (1,650 ft)
- Lowest elevation: 320 m (1,050 ft)
- Population (2023): 1,187
  - Density: 120/km^{2} (320/sq mi)
- Time zone: UTC+01:00 (CET)
  - Summer (DST): UTC+02:00 (CEST)
- INSEE/Postal code: 38351 /38300
- ^{1} French Land Register data, which excludes lakes, ponds, glaciers > 1 km^{2} (0.386 sq mi or 247 acres) and river estuaries.

Saint-Agnin-sur-Bion (French pronunciation: [sɛ̃.t‿aɲɛ̃ syʁ bjɔ̃]) is a commune in the Isère department in southeastern France.

== Population ==
Historical population
Year	Pop.	±% p.a.
1968	347	—
1975	390	+1.68%
1982	602	+6.40%
1990	646	+0.89%
1999	674	+0.47%
2007	775	+1.76%
2012	914	+3.35%
2017	1,043	+2.68%
2023	1,187	+2.18%
Source: INSEE

== See also ==
- Communes of the Isère department
