= Communauté d'agglomération Porte de l'Isère =

Porte de l'Isère
- Communauté d'agglomération
- Interactive map of Porte de l'Isère
- Coordinates: 45°37′N 05°13′E
- Country: France
- Region: Auvergne-Rhône-Alpes
- Department: Isère
- No. of communes: {{{nbcomm}}}
- Established: 2007
- Area: 245.9 km^{2} (94.9 sq mi)
- Population (2017): 106,737
  - Density: 434.1/km^{2} (1,124/sq mi)
- Website: capi-agglo.fr

Communauté d'agglomération Porte de l'Isère is an intercommunal structure, centred on the cities of L'Isle-d'Abeau and Bourgoin-Jallieu. It is located in the Isère department, in the Auvergne-Rhône-Alpes region, eastern France. It was created in January 2007. Its seat is in L'Isle-d'Abeau. Its area is 245.9 km^{2}. Its population was 106,737 in 2017.

== Composition ==
The communauté d'agglomération consists of the following 22 communes:

1. Bourgoin-Jallieu
2. Châteauvilain
3. Chèzeneuve
4. Crachier
5. Domarin
6. Eclose-Badinières
7. Les Éparres
8. Four
9. L'Isle-d'Abeau
10. Maubec
11. Meyrié
12. Nivolas-Vermelle
13. Ruy-Montceau
14. Saint-Alban-de-Roche
15. Saint-Quentin-Fallavier
16. Saint-Savin
17. Satolas-et-Bonce
18. Sérézin-de-la-Tour
19. Succieu
20. Vaulx-Milieu
21. La Verpillière
22. Villefontaine
