= Eclose-Badinières =

- Commune
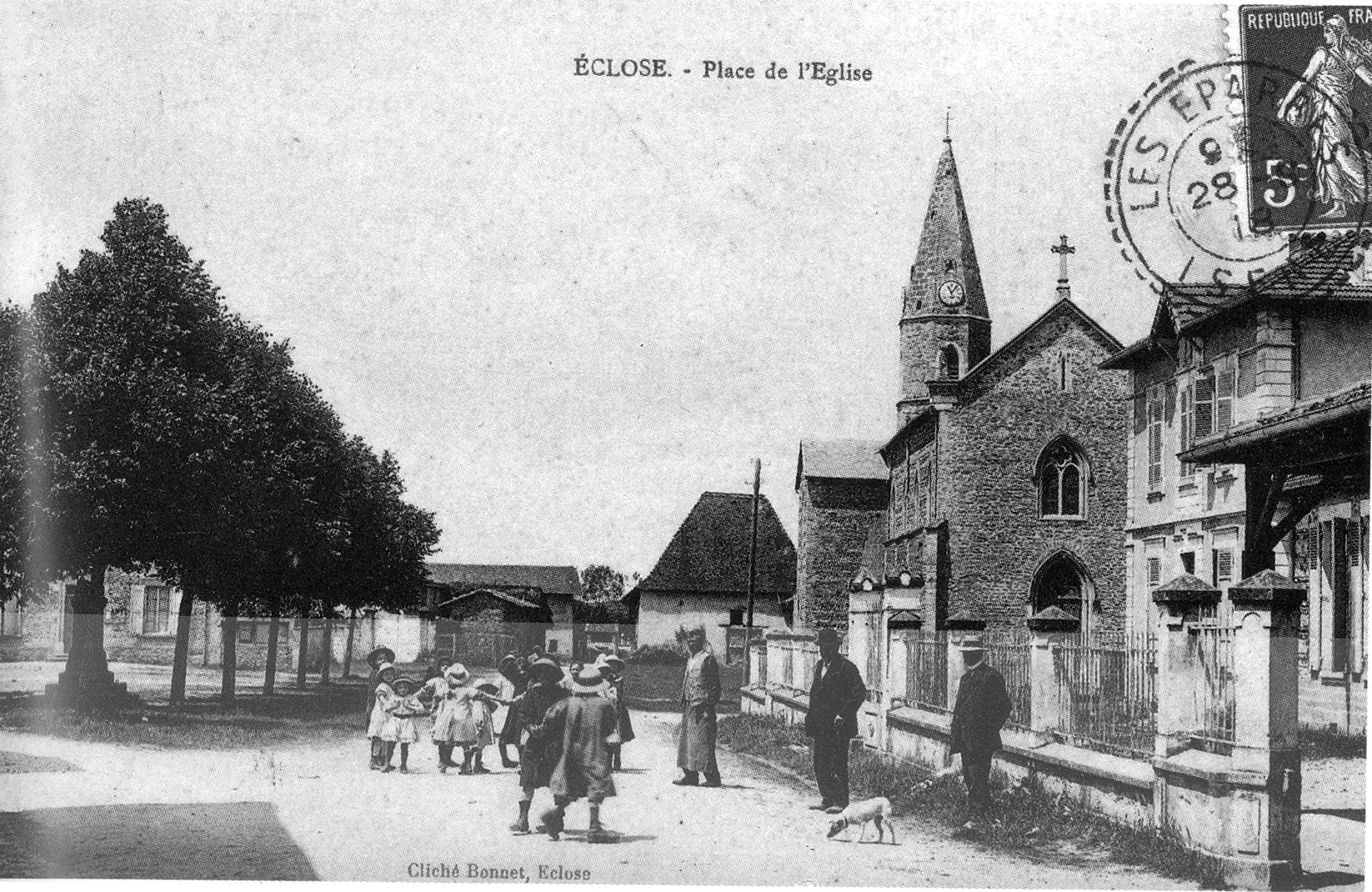
- Eclose in 1918

- Coat of arms
- Location of Eclose-Badinières
- Location within France Location within Auvergne-Rhône-Alpes
- Coordinates: 45°29′58″N 5°18′00″E
- Country: France
- Region: Auvergne-Rhône-Alpes
- Department: Isère
- Arrondissement: La Tour-du-Pin
- Canton: Bourgoin-Jallieu
- Intercommunality: CA Porte de l'Isère

Government
  - Mayor (2020–2026): Alain Berger
- Area^{1}: 16.28 km^{2} (6.29 sq mi)
- Highest elevation: 640 m (2,100 ft)
- Lowest elevation: 396 m (1,299 ft)
- Population (2023): 1,515
  - Density: 93.06/km^{2} (241.0/sq mi)
- Time zone: UTC+01:00 (CET)
  - Summer (DST): UTC+02:00 (CEST)
- INSEE/Postal code: 38152 /38300
- ^{1} French Land Register data, which excludes lakes, ponds, glaciers > 1 km^{2} (0.386 sq mi or 247 acres) and river estuaries.

Eclose-Badinières (French pronunciation: [ekloz badinjɛʁ]) is a commune in the Isère department in southeastern France. It was created in January 2015 by the merger of Eclose and Badinières.

== Population ==
Population data refer to the area corresponding with the commune as of January 2025.

Historical population
Year	Pop.	±% p.a.
1968	728	—
1975	804	+1.43%
1982	865	+1.05%
1990	909	+0.62%
1999	954	+0.54%
2007	1,265	+3.59%
2012	1,320	+0.85%
2017	1,434	+1.67%
2023	1,515	+0.92%
Source: INSEE

== See also ==
- Communes of the Isère department
