= Saint-Jean-de-Bournay =

- Commune
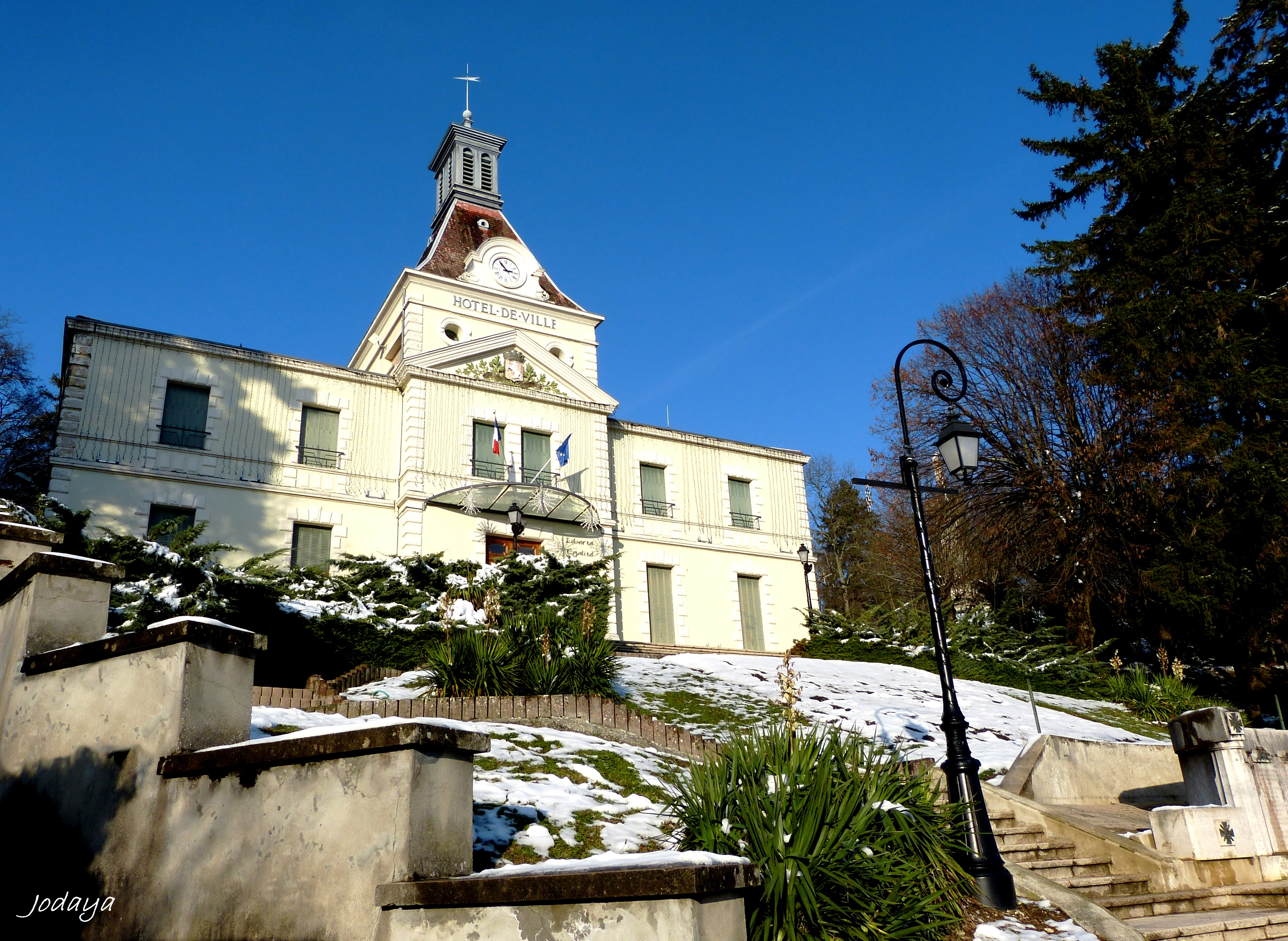
- The town hall of Saint-Jean-de-Bournay

- Coat of arms
- Location of Saint-Jean-de-Bournay
- Location within France Location within Auvergne-Rhône-Alpes
- Coordinates: 45°30′11″N 5°08′19″E
- Country: France
- Region: Auvergne-Rhône-Alpes
- Department: Isère
- Arrondissement: Vienne
- Canton: L'Isle-d'Abeau
- Intercommunality: Bièvre Isère

Government
  - Mayor (2020–2026): Franck Pourrat
- Area^{1}: 26.87 km^{2} (10.37 sq mi)
- Elevation: 380 m (1,250 ft)
- Highest elevation: 511 m (1,677 ft)
- Lowest elevation: 345 m (1,132 ft)
- Population (2023): 4,843
  - Density: 180.2/km^{2} (466.8/sq mi)
- Time zone: UTC+01:00 (CET)
  - Summer (DST): UTC+02:00 (CEST)
- INSEE/Postal code: 38399 /38440
- ^{1} French Land Register data, which excludes lakes, ponds, glaciers > 1 km^{2} (0.386 sq mi or 247 acres) and river estuaries.

Saint-Jean-de-Bournay (French pronunciation: [sɛ̃ ʒɑ̃ də buʁnɛ]) is a commune in the Isère department in southeastern France.

== Population ==
Historical population

Year	Pop.	±% p.a.
1793	2,675	—
1821	2,769	+0.12%
1846	3,279	+0.68%
1872	3,249	−0.04%
1901	3,285	+0.04%
1926	2,816	−0.61%
1946	2,586	−0.43%
1962	2,887	+0.69%
1968	3,174	+1.59%

Year	Pop.	±% p.a.
1975	3,240	+0.29%
1982	3,651	+1.72%
1990	3,764	+0.38%
1999	3,857	+0.27%
2007	4,234	+1.17%
2012	4,473	+1.10%
2017	4,594	+0.54%
2023	4,843	+0.88%

Source: EHESS and INSEE (1968-2023)

== International relations ==
It is twinned with Wath-upon-Dearne, South Yorkshire, England.

== See also ==
- Communes of the Isère department
