= Châteauvilain =

- Commune
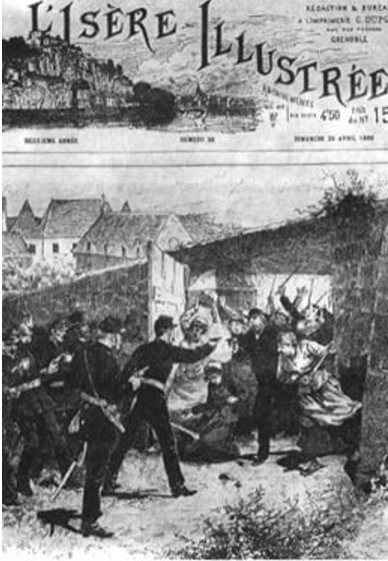
- The entrance of the gendarmes into the factory of Châteauvilain. L'Isère Illustrée of 25 April 1886.

- Coat of arms
- Location of Châteauvilain
- Location within France Location within Auvergne-Rhône-Alpes
- Coordinates: 45°31′03″N 5°19′51″E
- Country: France
- Region: Auvergne-Rhône-Alpes
- Department: Isère
- Arrondissement: La Tour-du-Pin
- Canton: Bourgoin-Jallieu
- Intercommunality: CA Porte de l'Isère

Government
  - Mayor (2020–2026): Daniel Gaude
- Area^{1}: 8.82 km^{2} (3.41 sq mi)
- Elevation: 500 m (1,600 ft)
- Highest elevation: 644 m (2,113 ft)
- Lowest elevation: 345 m (1,132 ft)
- Population (2023): 737
  - Density: 83.6/km^{2} (216/sq mi)
- Time zone: UTC+01:00 (CET)
  - Summer (DST): UTC+02:00 (CEST)
- INSEE/Postal code: 38091 /38300
- ^{1} French Land Register data, which excludes lakes, ponds, glaciers > 1 km^{2} (0.386 sq mi or 247 acres) and river estuaries.

Châteauvilain (French pronunciation: [ʃɑtovilɛ̃]) is a commune in the Isère department in south-eastern France.

== Population ==
Historical population
Year	Pop.	±% p.a.
1968	365	—
1975	355	−0.40%
1982	429	+2.74%
1990	438	+0.26%
1999	483	+1.09%
2007	603	+2.81%
2012	673	+2.22%
2017	716	+1.25%
2023	737	+0.48%
Source: INSEE

== See also ==
- Communes of the Isère department
