= Chèzeneuve =

- Commune
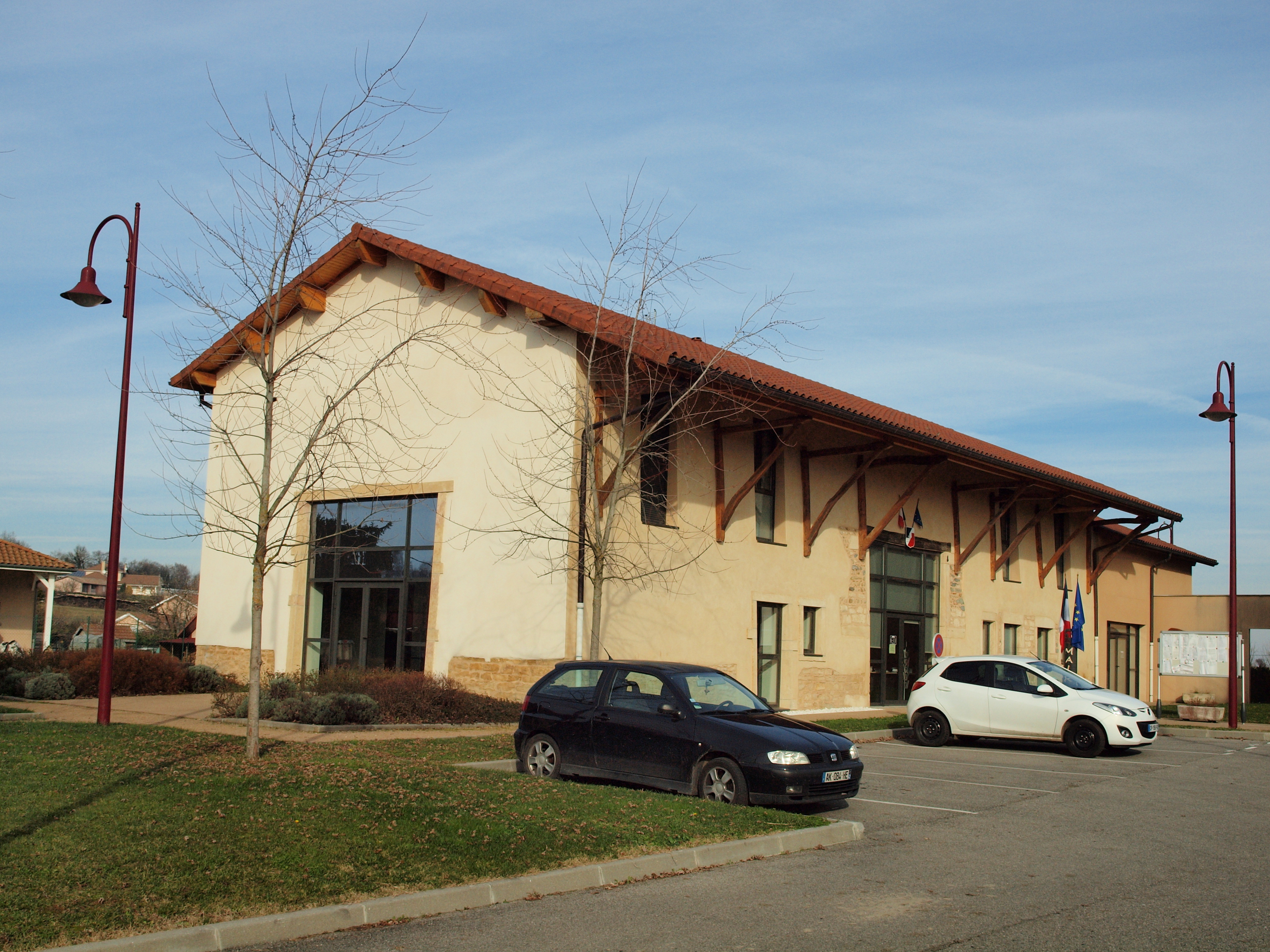
- The town hall of Chèzeneuve
- Location of Chèzeneuve
- Location within France Location within Auvergne-Rhône-Alpes
- Coordinates: 45°33′47″N 5°13′27″E
- Country: France
- Region: Auvergne-Rhône-Alpes
- Department: Isère
- Arrondissement: La Tour-du-Pin
- Canton: L'Isle-d'Abeau
- Intercommunality: CA Porte de l'Isère

Government
  - Mayor (2020–2026): Emmanuelle Bouin
- Area^{1}: 6.79 km^{2} (2.62 sq mi)
- Elevation: 480 m (1,570 ft)
- Highest elevation: 529 m (1,736 ft)
- Lowest elevation: 400 m (1,300 ft)
- Population (2023): 654
  - Density: 96.3/km^{2} (249/sq mi)
- Time zone: UTC+01:00 (CET)
  - Summer (DST): UTC+02:00 (CEST)
- INSEE/Postal code: 38102 /38300
- ^{1} French Land Register data, which excludes lakes, ponds, glaciers > 1 km^{2} (0.386 sq mi or 247 acres) and river estuaries.

Chèzeneuve (French pronunciation: [ʃɛznœv]) is a commune in the Isère department in southeastern France.

== Population ==
Historical population
Year	Pop.	±% p.a.
1968	247	—
1975	234	−0.77%
1982	306	+3.91%
1990	339	+1.29%
1999	373	+1.07%
2007	476	+3.09%
2012	515	+1.59%
2017	596	+2.96%
2023	654	+1.56%
Source: INSEE

== See also ==
- Communes of the Isère department
