= Salagnon =

- Commune
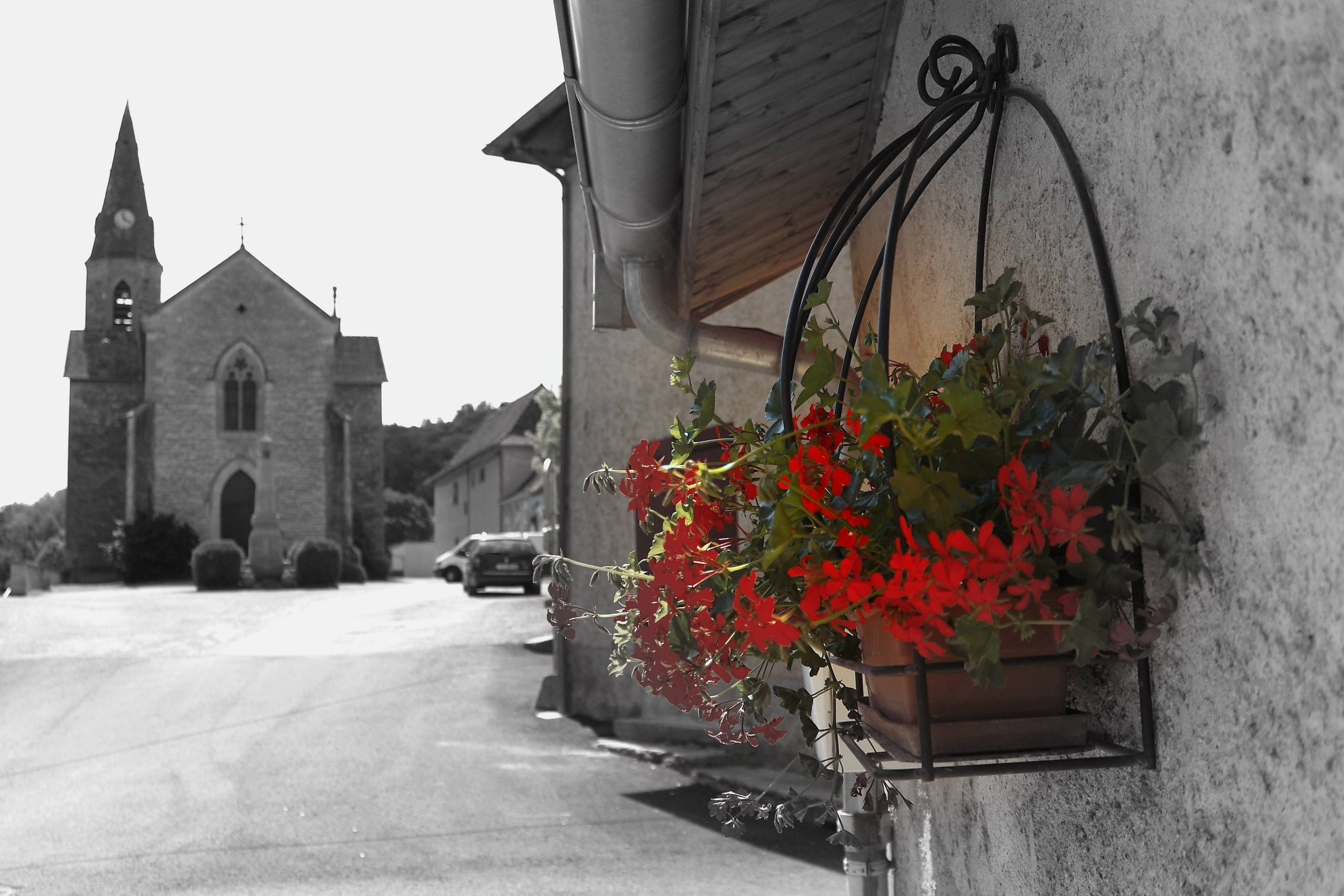
- The church of Salagnon

- Coat of arms
- Location of Salagnon
- Location within France Location within Auvergne-Rhône-Alpes
- Coordinates: 45°40′03″N 5°21′20″E
- Country: France
- Region: Auvergne-Rhône-Alpes
- Department: Isère
- Arrondissement: La Tour-du-Pin
- Canton: Bourgoin-Jallieu
- Intercommunality: Les Balcons du Dauphiné

Government
  - Mayor (2022–2026): Daniel Barret
- Area^{1}: 8.21 km^{2} (3.17 sq mi)
- Elevation: 290 m (950 ft)
- Highest elevation: 397 m (1,302 ft)
- Lowest elevation: 221 m (725 ft)
- Population (2023): 1,508
  - Density: 184/km^{2} (476/sq mi)
- Time zone: UTC+01:00 (CET)
  - Summer (DST): UTC+02:00 (CEST)
- INSEE/Postal code: 38467 /38890
- ^{1} French Land Register data, which excludes lakes, ponds, glaciers > 1 km^{2} (0.386 sq mi or 247 acres) and river estuaries.

Salagnon (French pronunciation: [salaɲɔ̃]) is a commune in the Isère department in southeastern France.

== Population ==
Historical population
| Year | Pop. | ±% p.a. |
|---|---|---|
| 1968 | 323 | — |
| 1975 | 357 | +1.44% |
| 1982 | 470 | +4.01% |
| 1990 | 693 | +4.97% |
| 1999 | 932 | +3.35% |
| 2007 | 1,149 | +2.65% |
| 2012 | 1,228 | +1.34% |
| 2017 | 1,420 | +2.95% |
| 2023 | 1,508 | +1.01% |
Source: INSEE

== See also ==
- Communes of the Isère department
