= Meyrié =

- Commune
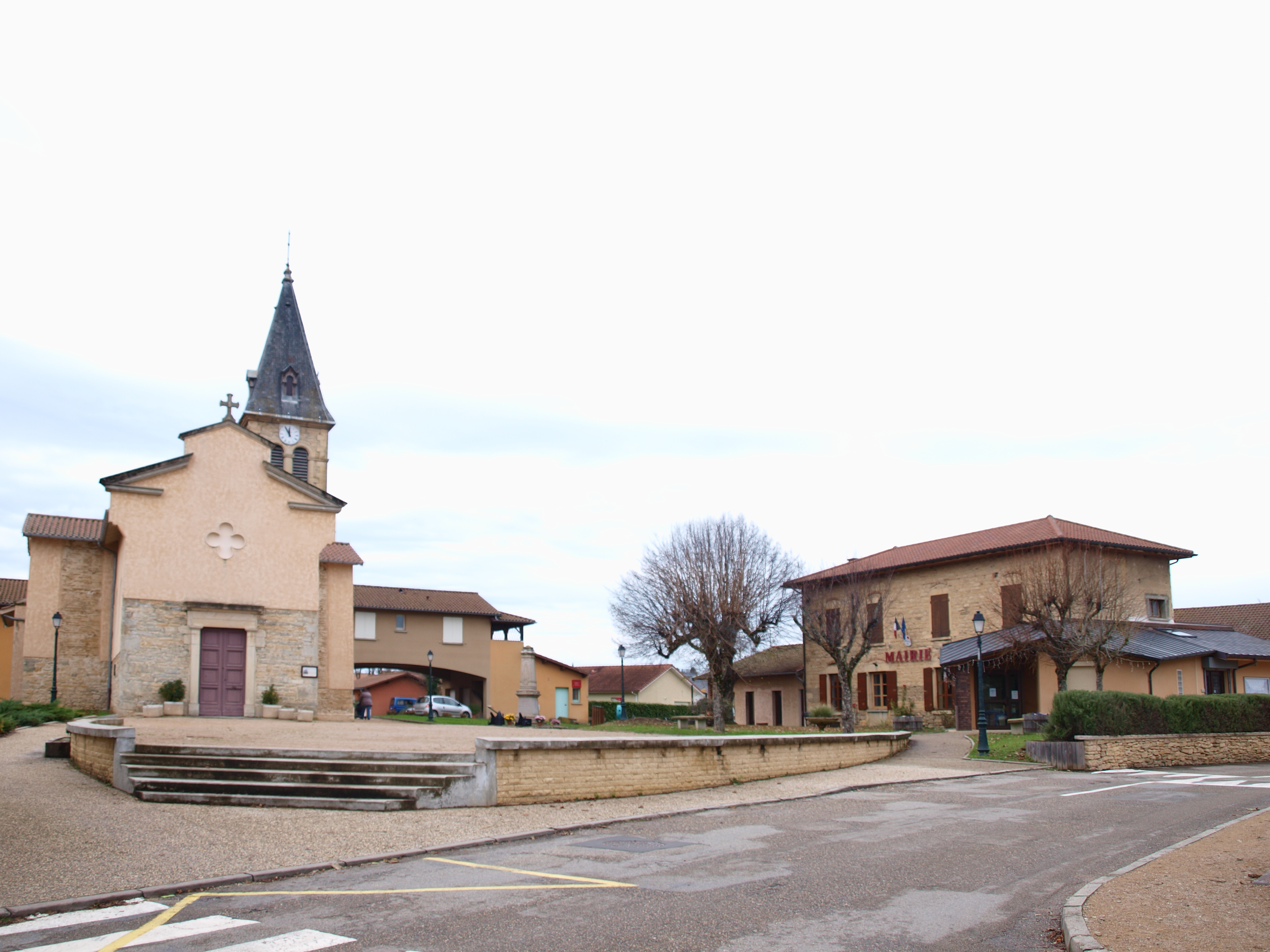
- The centre of the village
- Location of Meyrié
- Location within France Location within Auvergne-Rhône-Alpes
- Coordinates: 45°33′37″N 5°17′16″E
- Country: France
- Region: Auvergne-Rhône-Alpes
- Department: Isère
- Arrondissement: La Tour-du-Pin
- Canton: Bourgoin-Jallieu
- Intercommunality: CA Porte de l'Isère

Government
  - Mayor (2020–2026): Pascale Badin
- Area^{1}: 3.43 km^{2} (1.32 sq mi)
- Elevation: 376 m (1,234 ft)
- Highest elevation: 400 m (1,300 ft)
- Lowest elevation: 283 m (928 ft)
- Population (2023): 1,096
  - Density: 320/km^{2} (828/sq mi)
- Time zone: UTC+01:00 (CET)
  - Summer (DST): UTC+02:00 (CEST)
- INSEE/Postal code: 38230 /38300
- ^{1} French Land Register data, which excludes lakes, ponds, glaciers > 1 km^{2} (0.386 sq mi or 247 acres) and river estuaries.

Meyrié (French pronunciation: [mɛʁje]) is a commune in the Isère, Rhône-Alpes in southeastern France.

== Population ==
Historical population
Year	Pop.	±% p.a.
1968	208	—
1975	353	+7.85%
1982	690	+10.05%
1990	749	+1.03%
1999	831	+1.16%
2007	935	+1.48%
2012	1,037	+2.09%
2017	995	−0.82%
2023	1,096	+1.62%
Source: INSEE

== Twin towns – sister cities ==
Meyrié is twinned with:

- Bossico, Italy (1982)

== See also ==
- Communes of the Isère department
