= Maubec, Isère =

Maubec
- Commune
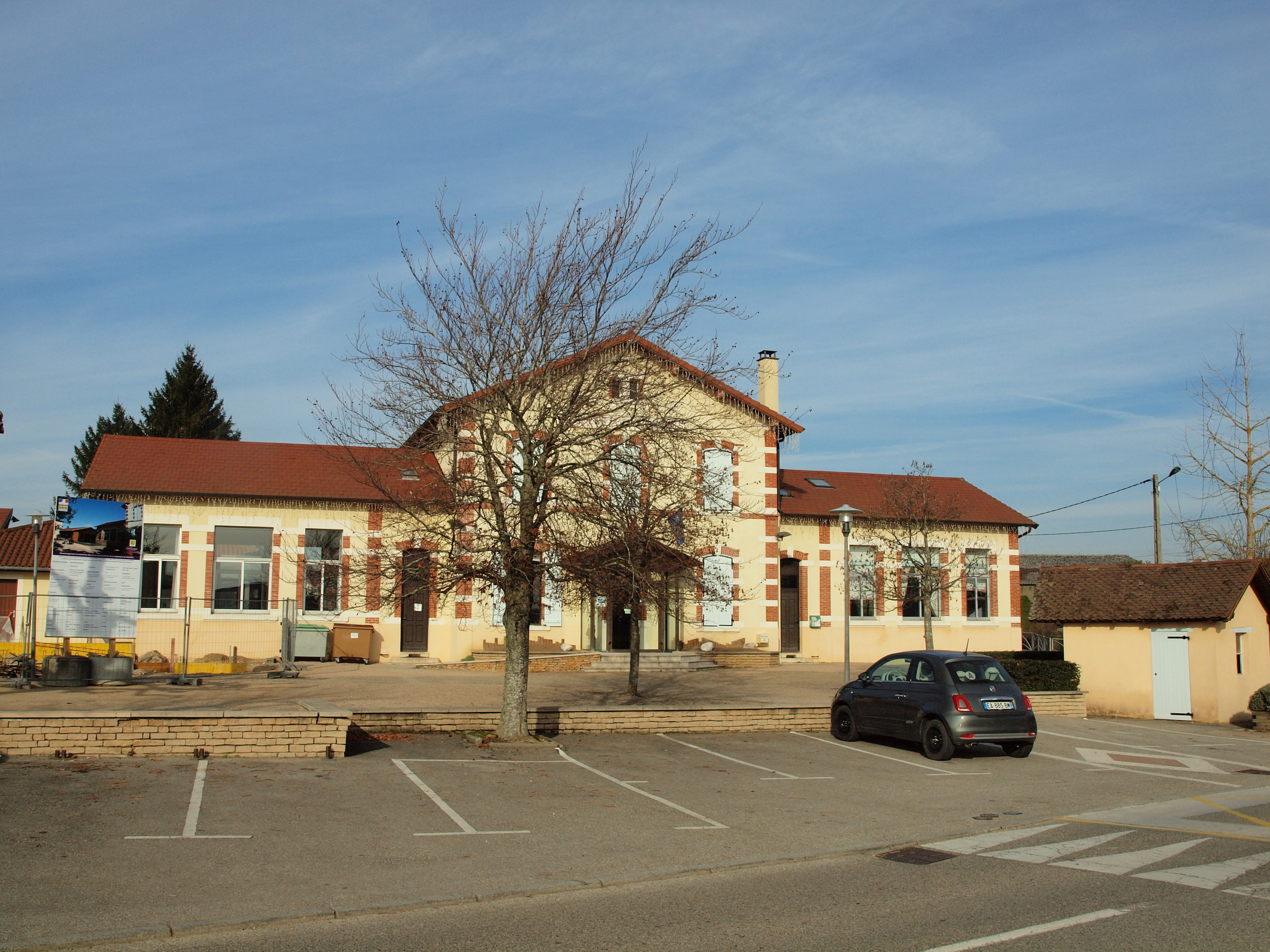
- The town hall and school of Maubec
- Location of Maubec
- Location within France Location within Auvergne-Rhône-Alpes
- Coordinates: 45°34′08″N 5°16′01″E
- Country: France
- Region: Auvergne-Rhône-Alpes
- Department: Isère
- Arrondissement: La Tour-du-Pin
- Canton: L'Isle-d'Abeau
- Intercommunality: CA Porte de l'Isère

Government
  - Mayor (2020–2026): Olivier Tisserand
- Area^{1}: 8.7 km^{2} (3.4 sq mi)
- Highest elevation: 450 m (1,480 ft)
- Lowest elevation: 350 m (1,150 ft)
- Population (2023): 1,930
  - Density: 220/km^{2} (570/sq mi)
- Time zone: UTC+01:00 (CET)
  - Summer (DST): UTC+02:00 (CEST)
- INSEE/Postal code: 38223 /38300
- ^{1} French Land Register data, which excludes lakes, ponds, glaciers > 1 km^{2} (0.386 sq mi or 247 acres) and river estuaries.

Maubec (French pronunciation: [mobɛk]) is a commune in the Isère department in southeastern France.

== Population ==
Historical population
Year	Pop.	±% p.a.
1968	761	—
1975	806	+0.82%
1982	981	+2.85%
1990	1,275	+3.33%
1999	1,367	+0.78%
2007	1,556	+1.63%
2012	1,671	+1.44%
2017	1,745	+0.87%
2023	1,930	+1.69%
Source: INSEE

== Twin towns ==
Maubec is twinned with:

- Zwischenwasser, Austria, since 1998

== See also ==
- Communes of the Isère department
