= Succieu =

- Commune
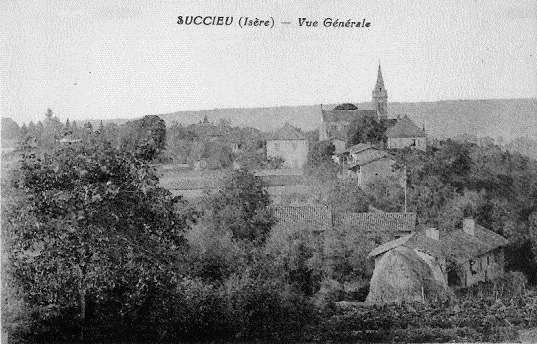
- A general view of Succieu at the start of the 20th century
- Location of Succieu
- Location within France Location within Auvergne-Rhône-Alpes
- Coordinates: 45°31′43″N 5°20′23″E
- Country: France
- Region: Auvergne-Rhône-Alpes
- Department: Isère
- Arrondissement: La Tour-du-Pin
- Canton: Bourgoin-Jallieu
- Intercommunality: CA Porte de l'Isère

Government
  - Mayor (2020–2026): Guillaume Vial
- Area^{1}: 8.35 km^{2} (3.22 sq mi)
- Elevation: 450 m (1,480 ft)
- Highest elevation: 571 m (1,873 ft)
- Lowest elevation: 324 m (1,063 ft)
- Population (2023): 777
  - Density: 93.1/km^{2} (241/sq mi)
- Time zone: UTC+01:00 (CET)
  - Summer (DST): UTC+02:00 (CEST)
- INSEE/Postal code: 38498 /38300
- ^{1} French Land Register data, which excludes lakes, ponds, glaciers > 1 km^{2} (0.386 sq mi or 247 acres) and river estuaries.

Succieu (French pronunciation: [sysjø]) is a commune in the Isère department in southeastern France.

== Population ==
Historical population
Year	Pop.	±% p.a.
1968	275	—
1975	296	+1.06%
1982	347	+2.30%
1990	526	+5.34%
1999	548	+0.46%
2007	679	+2.72%
2012	719	+1.15%
2017	735	+0.44%
2023	777	+0.93%
Source: INSEE

== See also ==
- Communes of the Isère department
