= Canton of L'Isle-d'Abeau =

Coordinates: 45.62°N 5.22°E

The canton of L'Isle-d'Abeau is an administrative division of the Isère department, eastern France. Its borders were modified at the French canton reorganisation which came into effect in March 2015. Its seat is in L'Isle-d'Abeau.

It consists of the following communes:

1. Chèzeneuve
2. Crachier
3. Culin
4. Four
5. L'Isle-d'Abeau
6. Maubec
7. Meyrieu-les-Étangs
8. Saint-Agnin-sur-Bion
9. Saint-Alban-de-Roche
10. Saint-Jean-de-Bournay
11. Tramolé
12. Vaulx-Milieu
13. Villefontaine
