= Canton of Bourgoin-Jallieu =

Coordinates: 45.59°N 5.28°E

The canton of Bourgoin-Jallieu is an administrative division of the Isère department, eastern France. It was created at the French canton reorganisation which came into effect in March 2015. Its seat is in Bourgoin-Jallieu.

It consists of the following communes:

1. Bourgoin-Jallieu
2. Châteauvilain
3. Domarin
4. Eclose-Badinières
5. Les Éparres
6. Meyrié
7. Nivolas-Vermelle
8. Ruy-Montceau
9. Saint-Chef
10. Saint-Marcel-Bel-Accueil
11. Saint-Savin
12. Salagnon
13. Sérézin-de-la-Tour
14. Succieu
