= Les Éparres =

- Commune
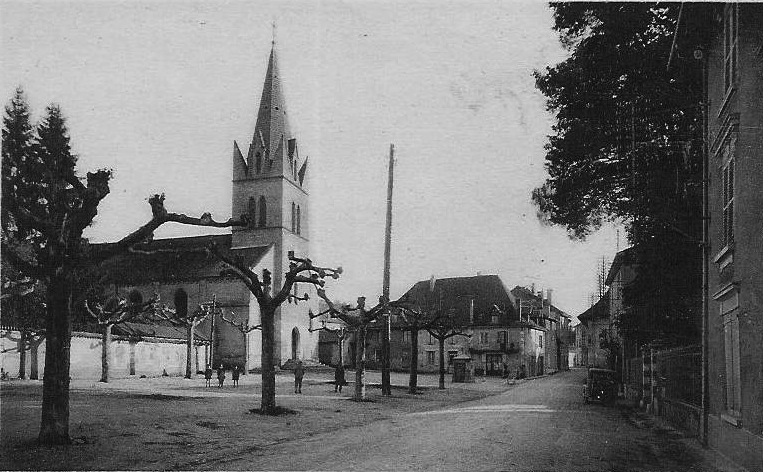
- Les Éparres at the start of the 20th century
- Location of Les Éparres
- Location within France Location within Auvergne-Rhône-Alpes
- Coordinates: 45°32′03″N 5°17′37″E
- Country: France
- Region: Auvergne-Rhône-Alpes
- Department: Isère
- Arrondissement: La Tour-du-Pin
- Canton: Bourgoin-Jallieu
- Intercommunality: CA Porte de l'Isère

Government
  - Mayor (2022–2026): Noel Suchet
- Area^{1}: 7.95 km^{2} (3.07 sq mi)
- Elevation: 428 m (1,404 ft)
- Highest elevation: 501 m (1,644 ft)
- Lowest elevation: 319 m (1,047 ft)
- Population (2023): 1,028
  - Density: 129/km^{2} (335/sq mi)
- Time zone: UTC+01:00 (CET)
  - Summer (DST): UTC+02:00 (CEST)
- INSEE/Postal code: 38156 /38300
- ^{1} French Land Register data, which excludes lakes, ponds, glaciers > 1 km^{2} (0.386 sq mi or 247 acres) and river estuaries.

Les Éparres (French pronunciation: [le.z‿epaʁ]) is a commune in the Isère department in southeastern France.

== Population ==
Historical population
Year	Pop.	±% p.a.
1968	731	—
1975	752	+0.41%
1982	707	−0.88%
1990	860	+2.48%
1999	916	+0.70%
2007	933	+0.23%
2012	921	−0.26%
2017	985	+1.35%
2023	1,028	+0.71%
Source: INSEE

== See also ==
- Communes of the Isère department
