= Vaulx-Milieu =

- Commune
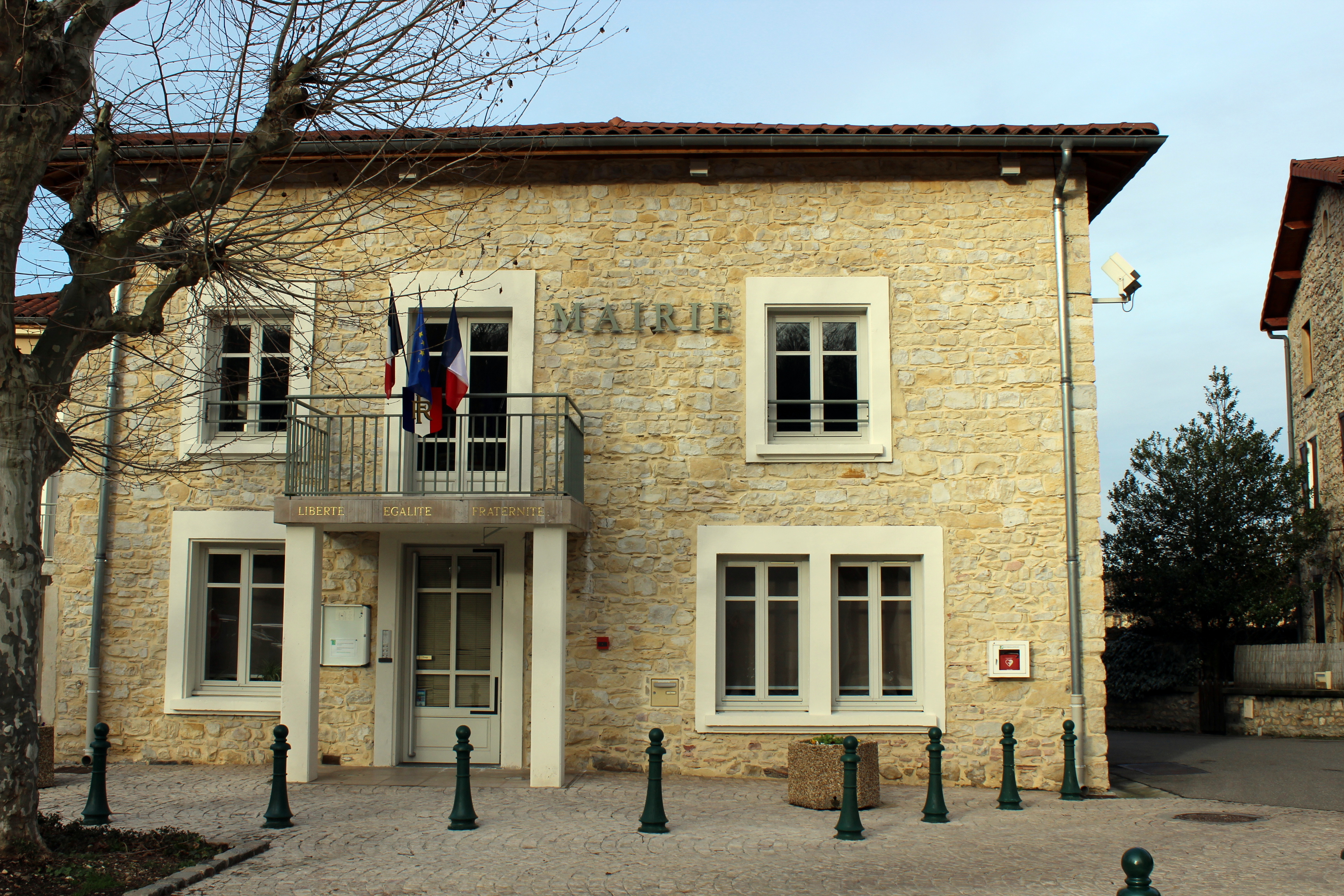
- Town hall

- Coat of arms
- Location of Vaulx-Milieu
- Location within France Location within Auvergne-Rhône-Alpes
- Coordinates: 45°36′48″N 5°10′55″E
- Country: France
- Region: Auvergne-Rhône-Alpes
- Department: Isère
- Arrondissement: La Tour-du-Pin
- Canton: L'Isle-d'Abeau
- Intercommunality: CA Porte de l'Isère

Government
  - Mayor (2020–2026): Dominique Berger
- Area^{1}: 9.02 km^{2} (3.48 sq mi)
- Highest elevation: 330 m (1,080 ft)
- Lowest elevation: 208 m (682 ft)
- Population (2023): 2,472
  - Density: 274/km^{2} (710/sq mi)
- Time zone: UTC+01:00 (CET)
  - Summer (DST): UTC+02:00 (CEST)
- INSEE/Postal code: 38530 /38090
- ^{1} French Land Register data, which excludes lakes, ponds, glaciers > 1 km^{2} (0.386 sq mi or 247 acres) and river estuaries.

Vaulx-Milieu (French pronunciation: [vo miljø]) is a commune in the Isère department in southeastern France.

== Geography ==
The Bourbre flows northwest through the middle of the commune.

== Population ==
Historical population

Year	Pop.	±% p.a.
1793	455	—
1821	657	+1.32%
1846	790	+0.74%
1872	709	−0.42%
1901	579	−0.70%
1926	508	−0.52%
1946	532	+0.23%
1962	609	+0.85%
1968	641	+0.86%

Year	Pop.	±% p.a.
1975	672	+0.68%
1982	1,443	+11.54%
1990	2,153	+5.13%
1999	2,216	+0.32%
2007	2,125	−0.52%
2012	2,396	+2.43%
2017	2,553	+1.28%
2023	2,472	−0.54%

Source: EHESS and INSEE (1968-2023)

== See also ==
- Communes of the Isère department
