= Villefontaine =

- Commune
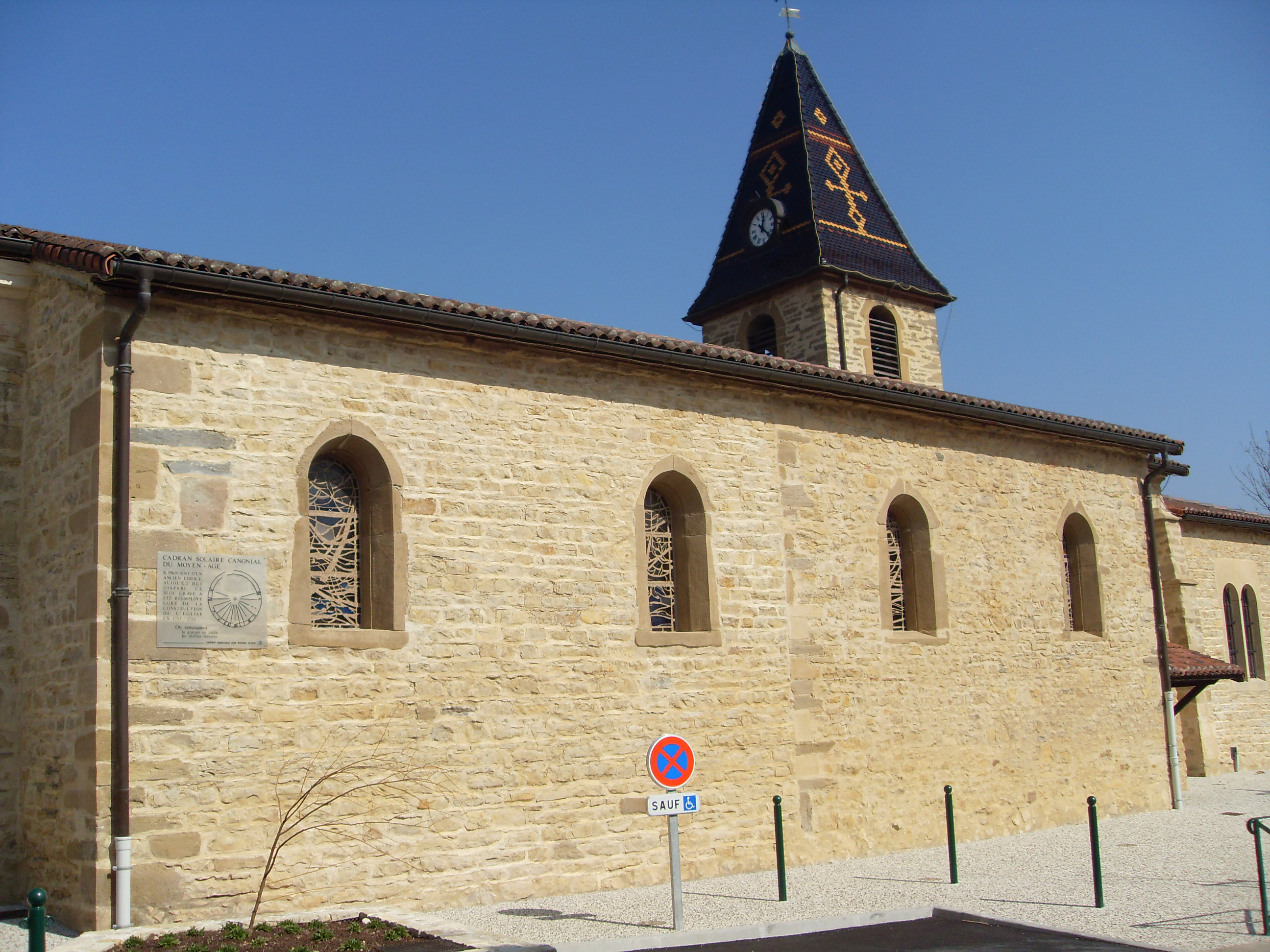
- The church of Villefontaine
- Location of Villefontaine
- Location within France Location within Auvergne-Rhône-Alpes
- Coordinates: 45°36′51″N 5°08′58″E
- Country: France
- Region: Auvergne-Rhône-Alpes
- Department: Isère
- Arrondissement: La Tour-du-Pin
- Canton: L'Isle-d'Abeau
- Intercommunality: CA Porte de l'Isère

Government
  - Mayor (2020–2026): Patrick Nicole-Williams
- Area^{1}: 11.63 km^{2} (4.49 sq mi)
- Highest elevation: 352 m (1,155 ft)
- Lowest elevation: 208 m (682 ft)
- Population (2023): 19,445
  - Density: 1,672/km^{2} (4,330/sq mi)
- Demonym: Villard (masculine) Villarde (feminine)
- Time zone: UTC+01:00 (CET)
  - Summer (DST): UTC+02:00 (CEST)
- INSEE/Postal code: 38553 /38090
- ^{1} French Land Register data, which excludes lakes, ponds, glaciers > 1 km^{2} (0.386 sq mi or 247 acres) and river estuaries.

Villefontaine (French pronunciation: [vilfɔ̃tɛn]) is a commune in the Isère department in southeastern France. in the Auvergne-Rhône-Alpes region.

== Geography ==
The Bourbre flows northwest through the northeastern part of the commune.

== Population ==
Historical population

Year	Pop.	±% p.a.
1793	345	—
1800	264	−3.75%
1806	322	+3.37%
1821	509	+3.10%
1831	503	−0.12%
1836	521	+0.71%
1841	519	−0.08%
1846	505	−0.55%
1851	541	+1.39%
1856	504	−1.41%
1861	462	−1.73%
1866	459	−0.13%
1872	451	−0.29%
1876	418	−1.88%
1881	409	−0.43%
1886	414	+0.24%
1891	408	−0.29%
1896	412	+0.20%
1901	414	+0.10%

Year	Pop.	±% p.a.
1906	392	−1.09%
1911	345	−2.52%
1921	432	+2.27%
1926	450	+0.82%
1931	509	+2.49%
1936	455	−2.22%
1946	395	−1.40%
1954	398	+0.09%
1962	467	+2.02%
1968	452	−0.54%
1975	1,694	+20.77%
1982	9,719	+28.35%
1990	16,171	+6.57%
1999	17,766	+1.05%
2007	18,721	+0.66%
2012	18,009	−0.77%
2017	18,763	+0.82%
2023	19,445	+0.60%

Source: EHESS and INSEE (1968-2023)

== Twin towns – sister cities ==
Villefontaine is twinned with:

- Kahl am Main, Germany (1990)
- Bitterfeld-Wolfen, Germany (1994)
- Gremda, Tunisia (1994)
- Salzano, Italy (2009)

== See also ==
- Communes of the Isère department
