= Nivolas-Vermelle =

- Commune
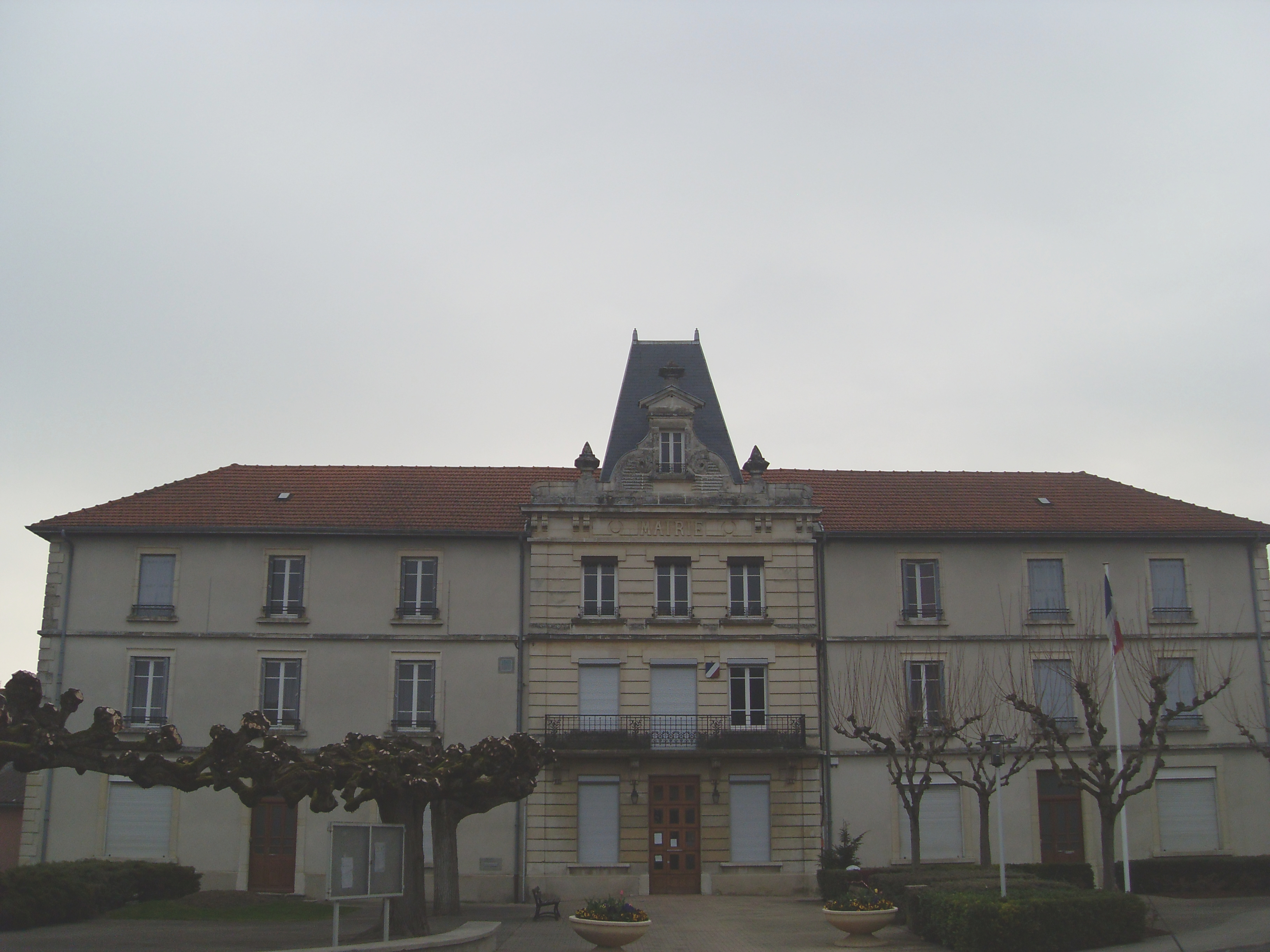
- Town hall

- Coat of arms
- Location of Nivolas-Vermelle
- Location within France Location within Auvergne-Rhône-Alpes
- Coordinates: 45°33′27″N 5°18′26″E
- Country: France
- Region: Auvergne-Rhône-Alpes
- Department: Isère
- Arrondissement: La Tour-du-Pin
- Canton: Bourgoin-Jallieu
- Intercommunality: CA Porte de l'Isère

Government
  - Mayor (2020–2026): Christian Beton
- Area^{1}: 6.09 km^{2} (2.35 sq mi)
- Highest elevation: 441 m (1,447 ft)
- Lowest elevation: 258 m (846 ft)
- Population (2023): 2,706
  - Density: 444/km^{2} (1,150/sq mi)
- Time zone: UTC+01:00 (CET)
  - Summer (DST): UTC+02:00 (CEST)
- INSEE/Postal code: 38276 /38300
- ^{1} French Land Register data, which excludes lakes, ponds, glaciers > 1 km^{2} (0.386 sq mi or 247 acres) and river estuaries.

Nivolas-Vermelle (French pronunciation: [nivɔla vɛʁmɛl]) is a commune in the Isère department in southeastern France.

== Geography ==
The Bourbre forms most of the commune's northeastern border.

== Population ==
Historical population

Year	Pop.	±% p.a.
1881	975	—
1886	982	+0.14%
1891	1,006	+0.48%
1896	1,131	+2.37%
1901	1,268	+2.31%
1906	1,277	+0.14%
1911	1,265	−0.19%
1921	1,186	−0.64%
1926	1,401	+3.39%
1931	1,494	+1.29%
1936	1,205	−4.21%
1946	1,122	−0.71%

Year	Pop.	±% p.a.
1954	1,161	+0.43%
1962	1,187	+0.28%
1968	1,372	+2.44%
1975	1,699	+3.10%
1982	1,615	−0.72%
1990	1,638	+0.18%
1999	1,823	+1.20%
2007	2,243	+2.63%
2012	2,407	+1.42%
2017	2,649	+1.93%
2023	2,706	+0.36%

Source: EHESS and INSEE (1968-2023)

== See also ==
- Communes of the Isère department
