= Four, Isère =

Four
- Commune
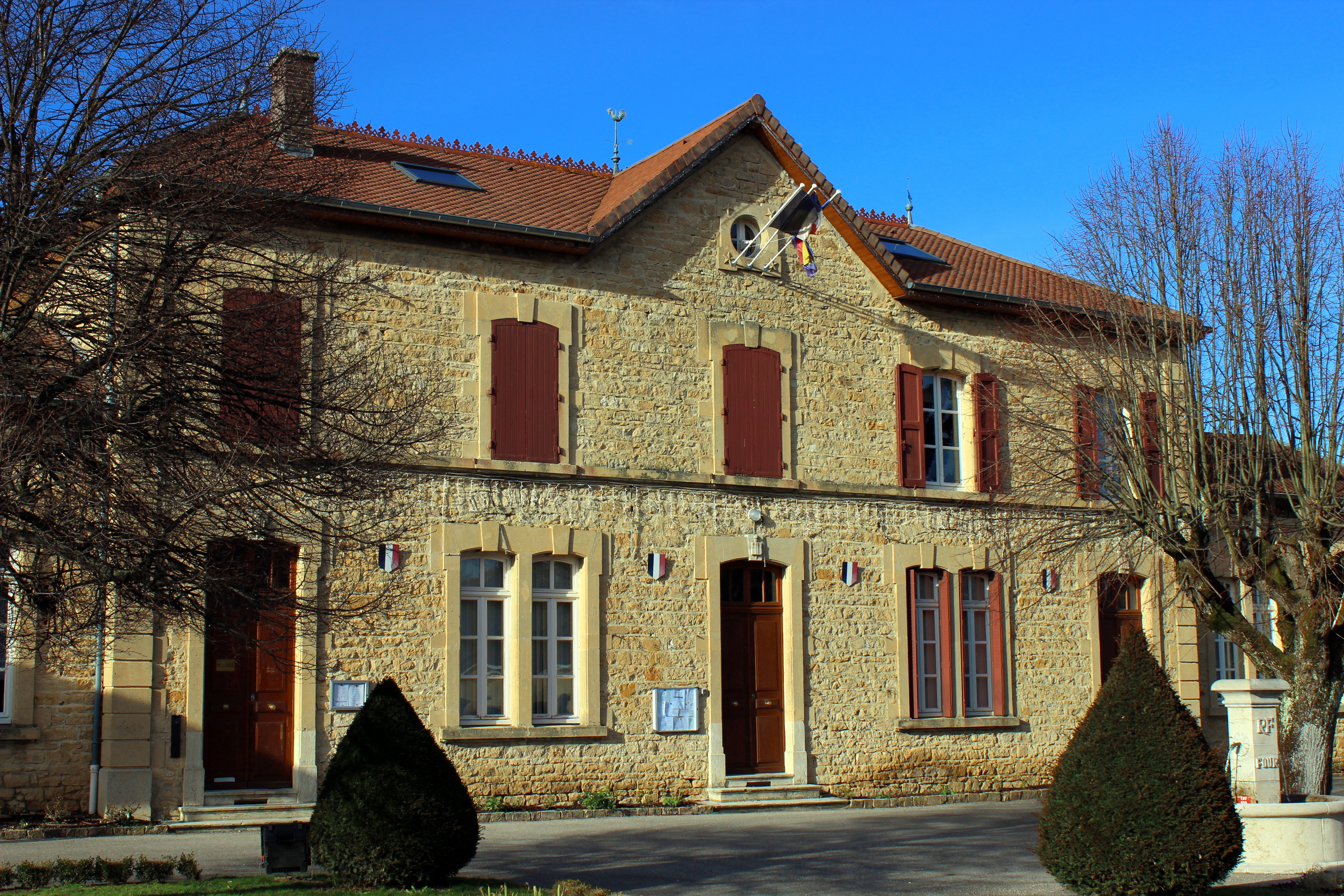
- The town hall of Four
- Location of Four
- Location within France Location within Auvergne-Rhône-Alpes
- Coordinates: 45°35′17″N 5°11′47″E
- Country: France
- Region: Auvergne-Rhône-Alpes
- Department: Isère
- Arrondissement: La Tour-du-Pin
- Canton: L'Isle-d'Abeau
- Intercommunality: CA Porte de l'Isère

Government
  - Mayor (2020–2026): Jean Papadopulo
- Area^{1}: 11.82 km^{2} (4.56 sq mi)
- Elevation: 330 m (1,080 ft)
- Highest elevation: 529 m (1,736 ft)
- Lowest elevation: 270 m (890 ft)
- Population (2023): 1,673
  - Density: 141.5/km^{2} (366.6/sq mi)
- Time zone: UTC+01:00 (CET)
  - Summer (DST): UTC+02:00 (CEST)
- INSEE/Postal code: 38172 /38080
- ^{1} French Land Register data, which excludes lakes, ponds, glaciers > 1 km^{2} (0.386 sq mi or 247 acres) and river estuaries.

Four (French pronunciation: [fuʁ]) is a commune in the Isère department in southeastern France.

== Population ==
Historical population
Year	Pop.	±% p.a.
1968	565	—
1975	556	−0.23%
1982	655	+2.37%
1990	733	+1.42%
1999	912	+2.46%
2007	980	+0.90%
2012	1,204	+4.20%
2017	1,494	+4.41%
2023	1,673	+1.90%
Source: INSEE

== Twin towns ==
Four is twinned with:

- Pusiano, Italy, since 2013

== See also ==
- Communes of the Isère department
