= Sérézin-de-la-Tour =

- Commune
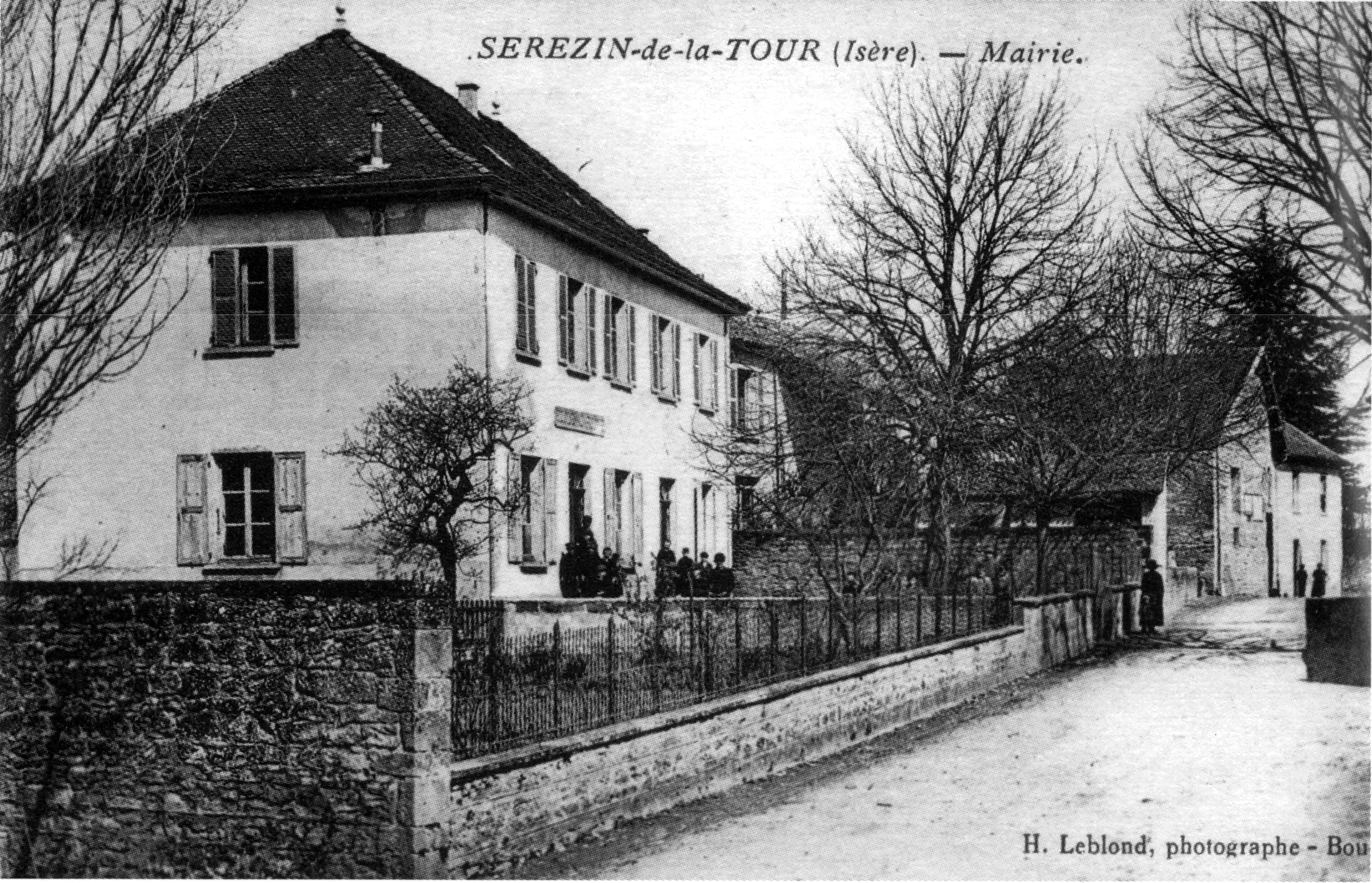
- Sérezin-la Tour town hall in 1908
- Location of Sérézin-de-la-Tour
- Location within France Location within Auvergne-Rhône-Alpes
- Coordinates: 45°33′30″N 5°20′42″E
- Country: France
- Region: Auvergne-Rhône-Alpes
- Department: Isère
- Arrondissement: La Tour-du-Pin
- Canton: Bourgoin-Jallieu
- Intercommunality: CA Porte de l'Isère

Government
  - Mayor (2020–2026): Daniel Wajda
- Area^{1}: 9.31 km^{2} (3.59 sq mi)
- Elevation: 318 m (1,043 ft)
- Highest elevation: 466 m (1,529 ft)
- Lowest elevation: 266 m (873 ft)
- Population (2023): 1,135
  - Density: 122/km^{2} (316/sq mi)
- Demonym: Sérézinnois
- Time zone: UTC+01:00 (CET)
  - Summer (DST): UTC+02:00 (CEST)
- INSEE/Postal code: 38481 /38300
- Website: https://www.serezindelatour.fr/
- ^{1} French Land Register data, which excludes lakes, ponds, glaciers > 1 km^{2} (0.386 sq mi or 247 acres) and river estuaries.

Sérézin-de-la-Tour (French pronunciation: [seʁezɛ̃ də la tuʁ], literally Sérézin of La Tour) is a commune in the Isère department in the region Auvergne-Rhône-Alpes southeastern France.

== Geography ==
The Bourbre forms part of the commune's northern border.

== Population ==
Historical population
Year	Pop.	±% p.a.
1968	386	—
1975	389	+0.11%
1982	482	+3.11%
1990	529	+1.17%
1999	611	+1.61%
2007	800	+3.43%
2012	925	+2.95%
2017	1,057	+2.70%
2023	1,135	+1.19%
Source: INSEE

Its inhabitants are known as the Sérézinnois in French.

== See also ==
- Communes of the Isère department
