= Saint-Alban-de-Roche =

- Commune
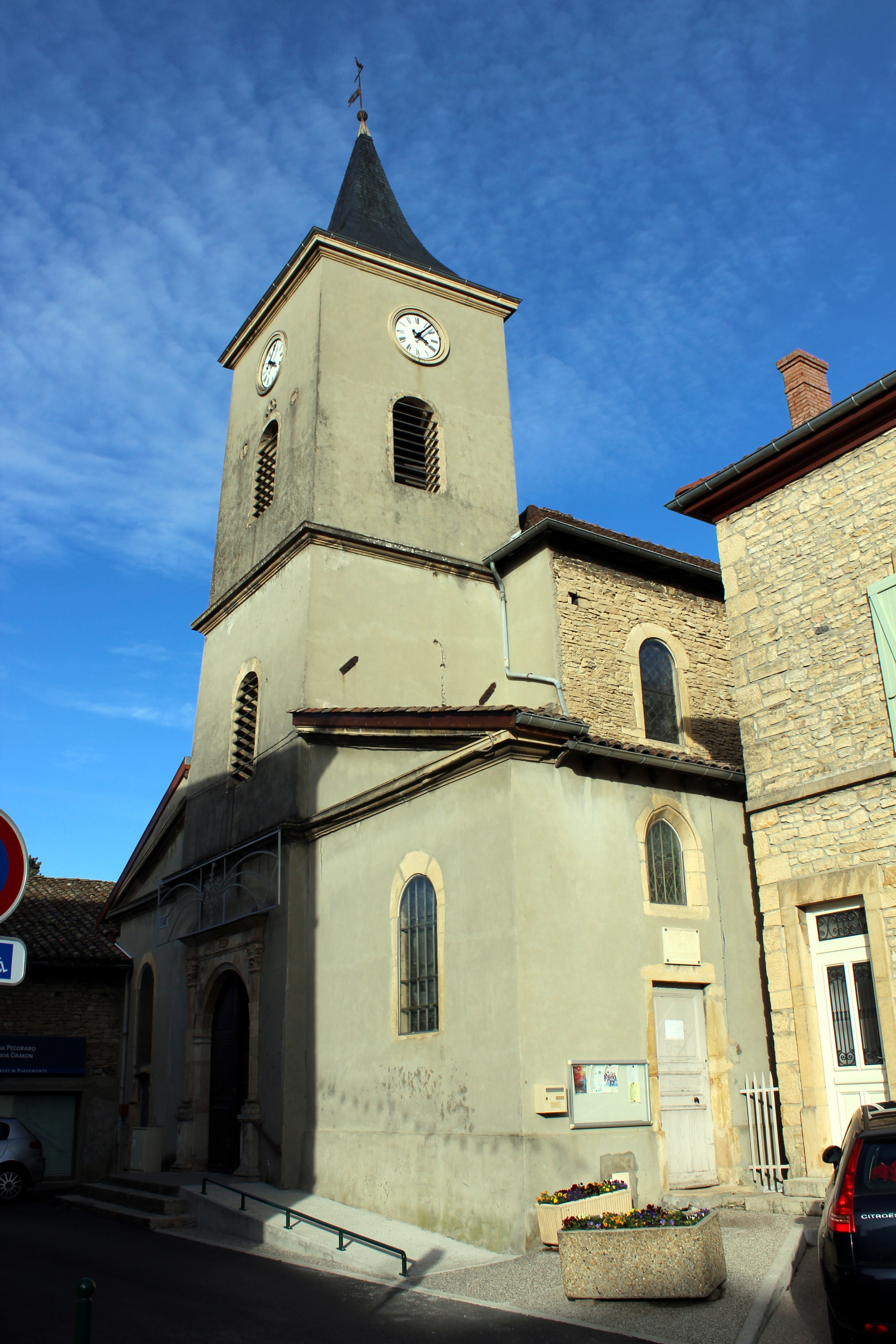
- The church of Saint-Alban-de-Roche

- Coat of arms
- Location of Saint-Alban-de-Roche
- Location within France Location within Auvergne-Rhône-Alpes
- Coordinates: 45°35′49″N 5°13′30″E
- Country: France
- Region: Auvergne-Rhône-Alpes
- Department: Isère
- Arrondissement: La Tour-du-Pin
- Canton: L'Isle-d'Abeau
- Intercommunality: CA Porte de l'Isère

Government
  - Mayor (2020–2026): Christophe Laville
- Area^{1}: 6.11 km^{2} (2.36 sq mi)
- Highest elevation: 462 m (1,516 ft)
- Lowest elevation: 230 m (750 ft)
- Population (2023): 2,168
  - Density: 355/km^{2} (919/sq mi)
- Time zone: UTC+01:00 (CET)
  - Summer (DST): UTC+02:00 (CEST)
- INSEE/Postal code: 38352 /38080
- ^{1} French Land Register data, which excludes lakes, ponds, glaciers > 1 km^{2} (0.386 sq mi or 247 acres) and river estuaries.

Saint-Alban-de-Roche (French pronunciation: [sɛ̃.t‿albɑ̃ də ʁɔʃ]) is a commune in the Isère department in southeastern France.

== Population ==
Historical population

Year	Pop.	±% p.a.
1793	601	—
1821	844	+1.22%
1846	1,103	+1.08%
1872	1,100	−0.01%
1901	1,149	+0.15%
1926	929	−0.85%
1946	821	−0.62%
1962	941	+0.86%
1968	944	+0.05%

Year	Pop.	±% p.a.
1975	1,070	+1.81%
1982	1,289	+2.70%
1990	1,545	+2.29%
1999	1,760	+1.46%
2007	1,856	+0.67%
2012	1,840	−0.17%
2017	1,982	+1.50%
2023	2,168	+1.51%

Source: EHESS and INSEE (1968-2023)

== See also ==
- Communes of the Isère department
