= Sultans Trail =

Long-distance footpath from Vienna to Istanbul

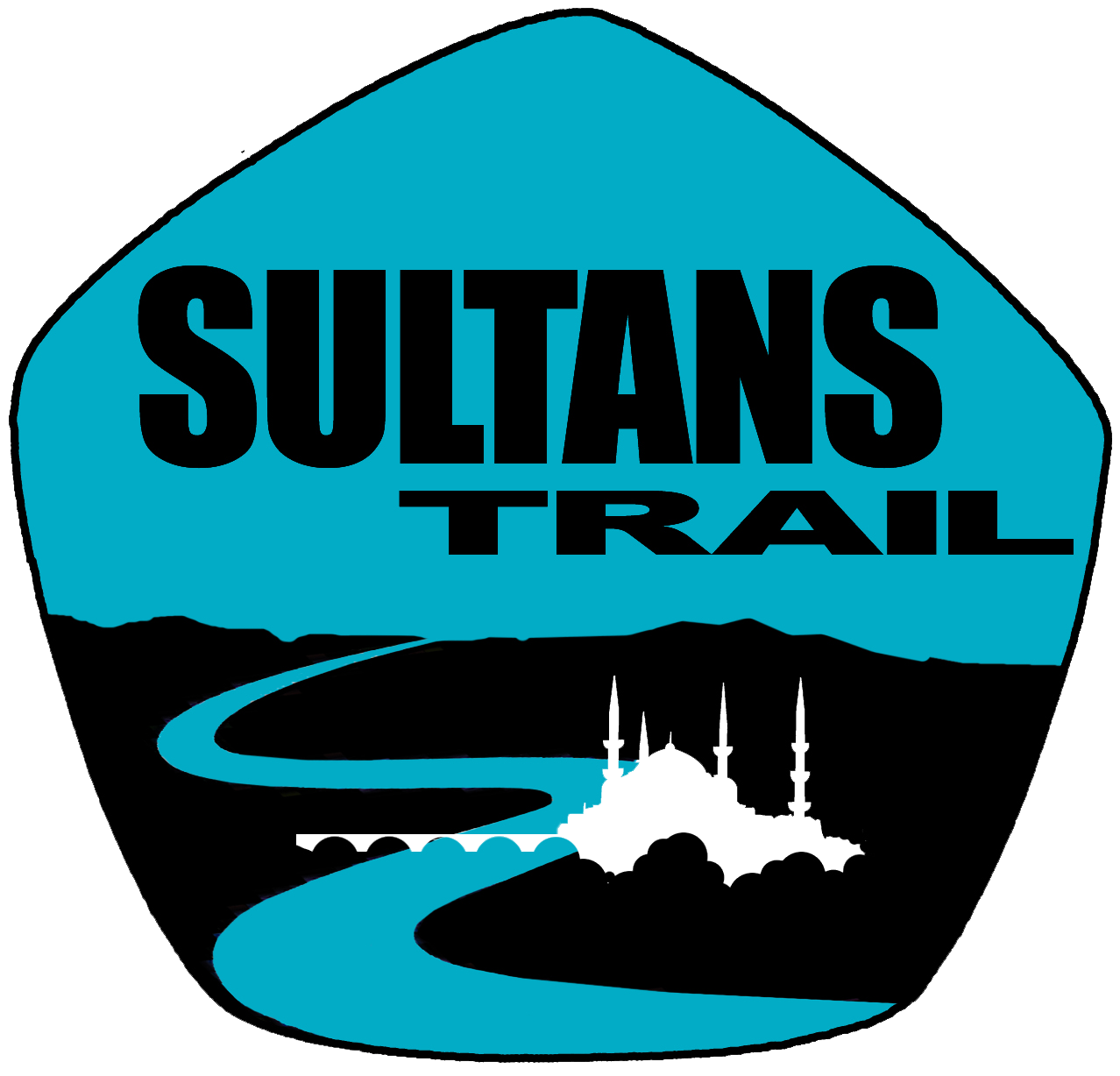
Logo Sultans Trail Foundation

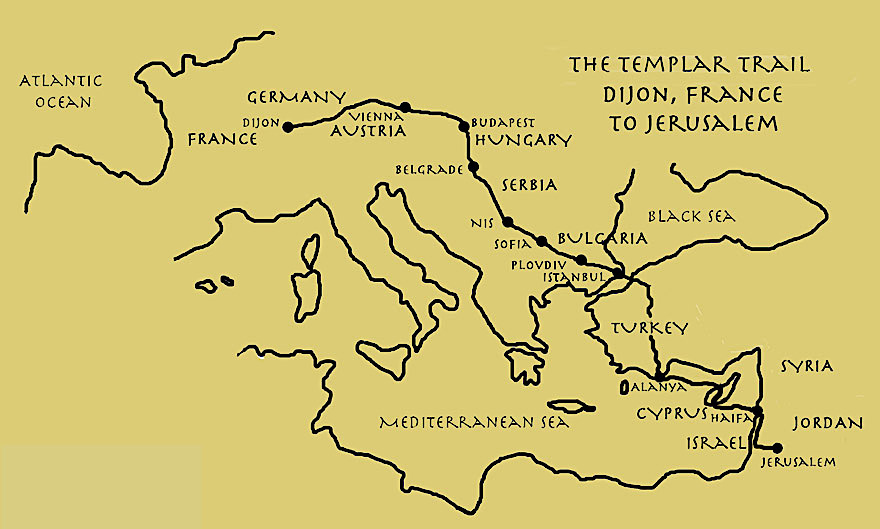
Templar Trail, part of which also connects Vienna to Istanbul

The Sultans Trail is a long-distance footpath from Vienna to Istanbul. It is 2,500 kilometres (1,600 mi) long. The path passes through Austria, Slovakia, Hungary, Croatia, Serbia, Bulgaria, East Macedonia and Thrace in northern Greece, and Turkey.

== History ==
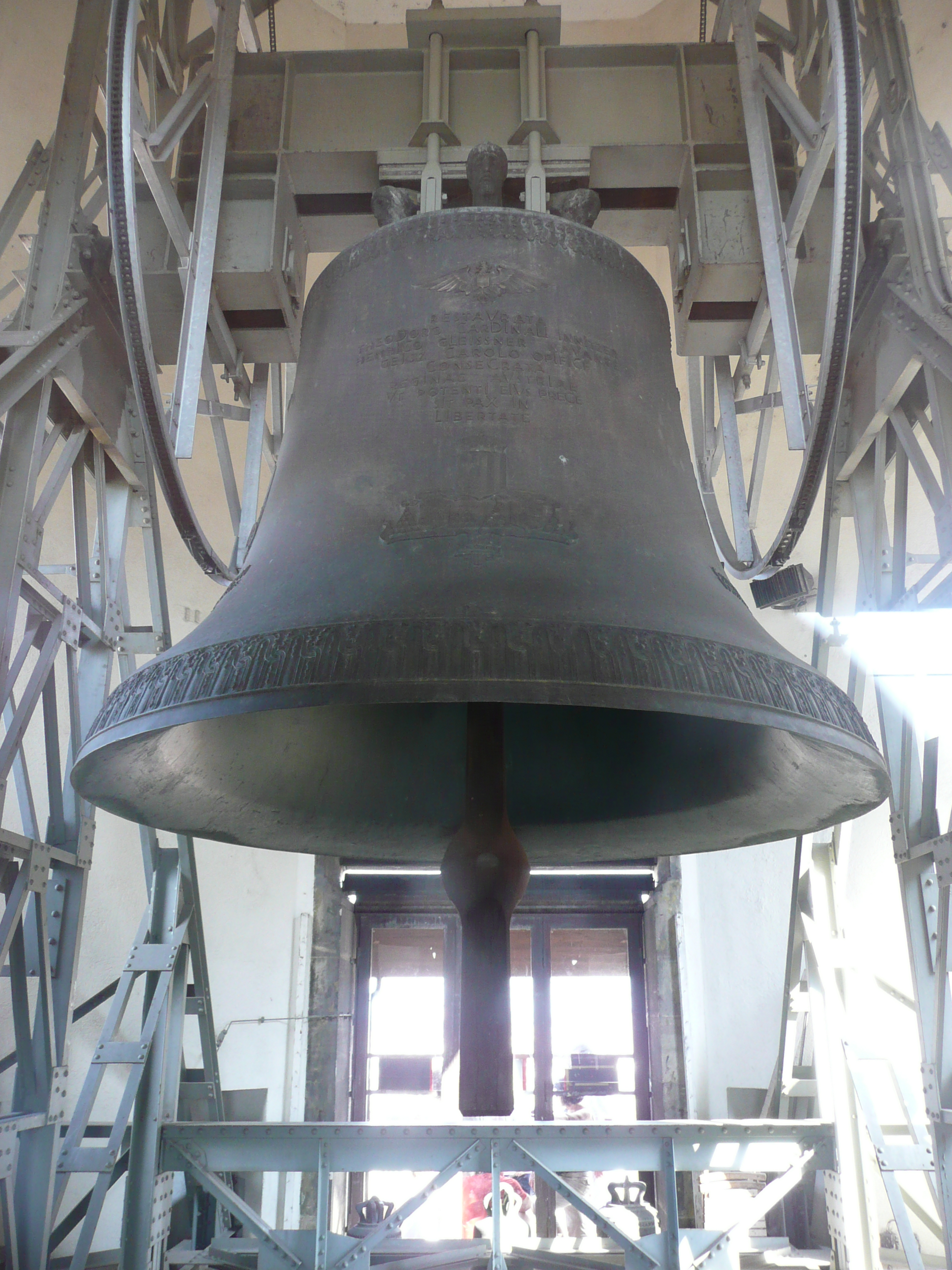
Pummerin, St. Stephen's Cathedral, Vienna is the third largest swinging bell in Europe

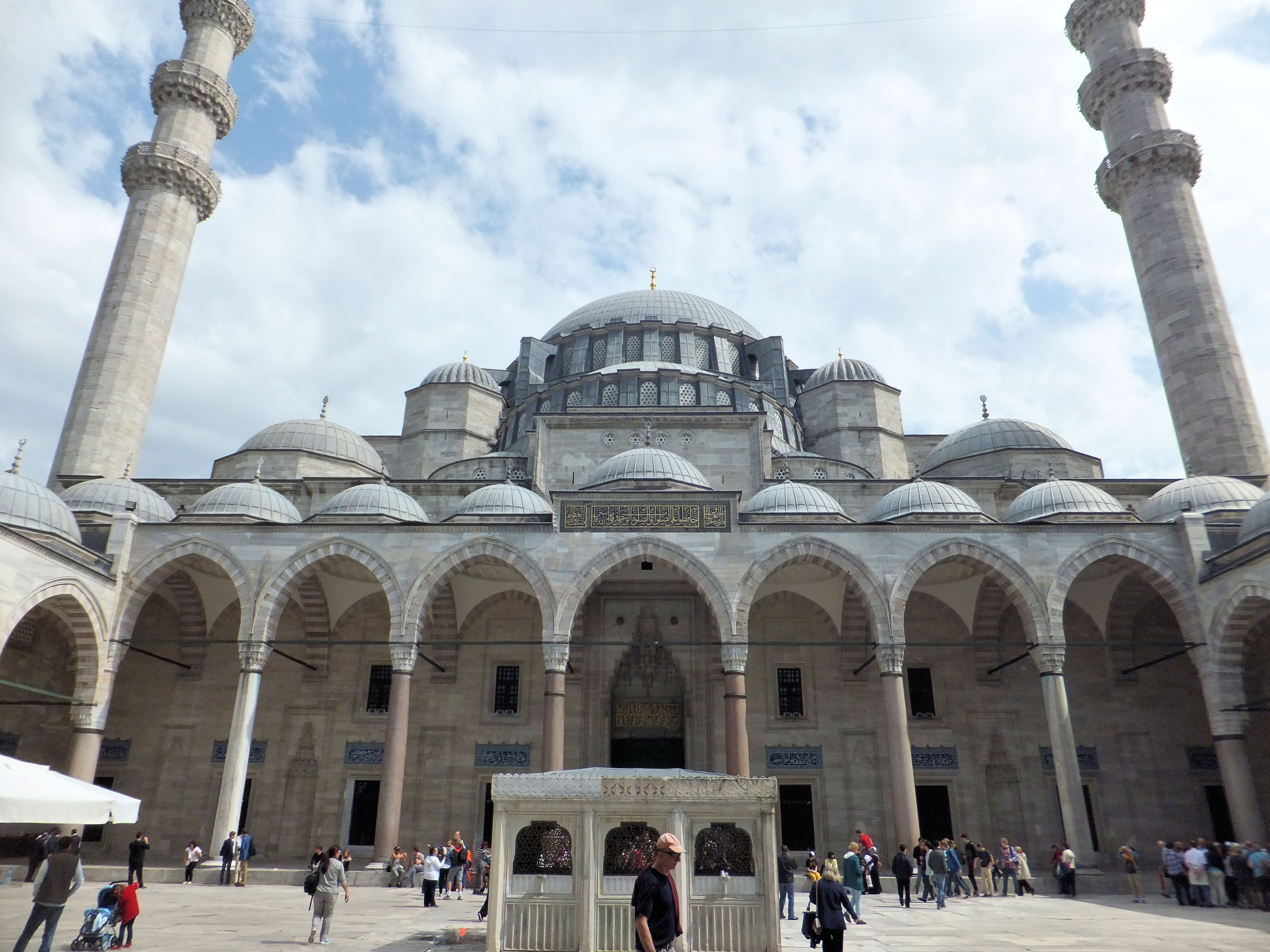
Tomb of Sultan Süleiman in Istanbul

Sultans Trail [sic] (recte Sultan's) takes its name from Sultan Süleyman Kanuni, Suleiman the Magnificent, of the Ottoman Empire, who led Ottoman armies to conquer Belgrade and most of Hungary before his invasion was checked at the Siege of Vienna. The main path follows the route of Suleiman the Magnificent on his way to Vienna. He departed from Istanbul on 10 May 1529 and arrived in Vienna on 23 September 1529 (141 days). It was to be the Ottoman Empire's most ambitious expedition to the west, but the Austrian garrison inflicted upon Suleiman his first defeat. A second attempt to conquer Vienna failed in 1532. In 1566, at the age of 72, the sultan led his army for the last time; he died close to Szigetvár in Hungary.

In contrast to its past, the Sultans Trail today serves as a path of peace and a meeting place for people of all faiths and cultures. The trail starts at St. Stephen's Cathedral in the centre of Vienna; the bell of this church is made from Ottoman cannons. It ends in Istanbul at the Süleymaniye Mosque, a religious complex that includes the mausoleums of Suleiman the Magnificent and his wife Hurrem Sultan.

The Sultans Trail was developed by volunteers from the Netherlands-based NGO Sultans Trail – A European Cultural Route. It follows part of the E8 European long-distance path. Apart from the Bulgarian mountains, the trail can be walked year-round. Most parts of the route have ample accommodation such as hotels, pensions or private rooms. In parts of Hungary and Bulgaria, a tent is recommended.

== In popular culture ==
In 2020, the BBC broadcast series three of Pilgrimage: The Road to Istanbul which was about the Sultans Trail.

In 2025, the Austrian author Martin Zinggl published an account of his travels on the Sultans Trail in German, titled: "Das ist kein Spaziergang. Auf dem Sultans Trail zu Fuß von Wien nach Istanbul".

== Route of the Sultans Trail ==
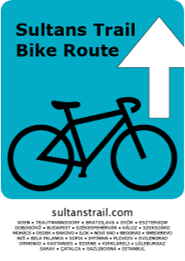
Sultans Trail hiking sticker

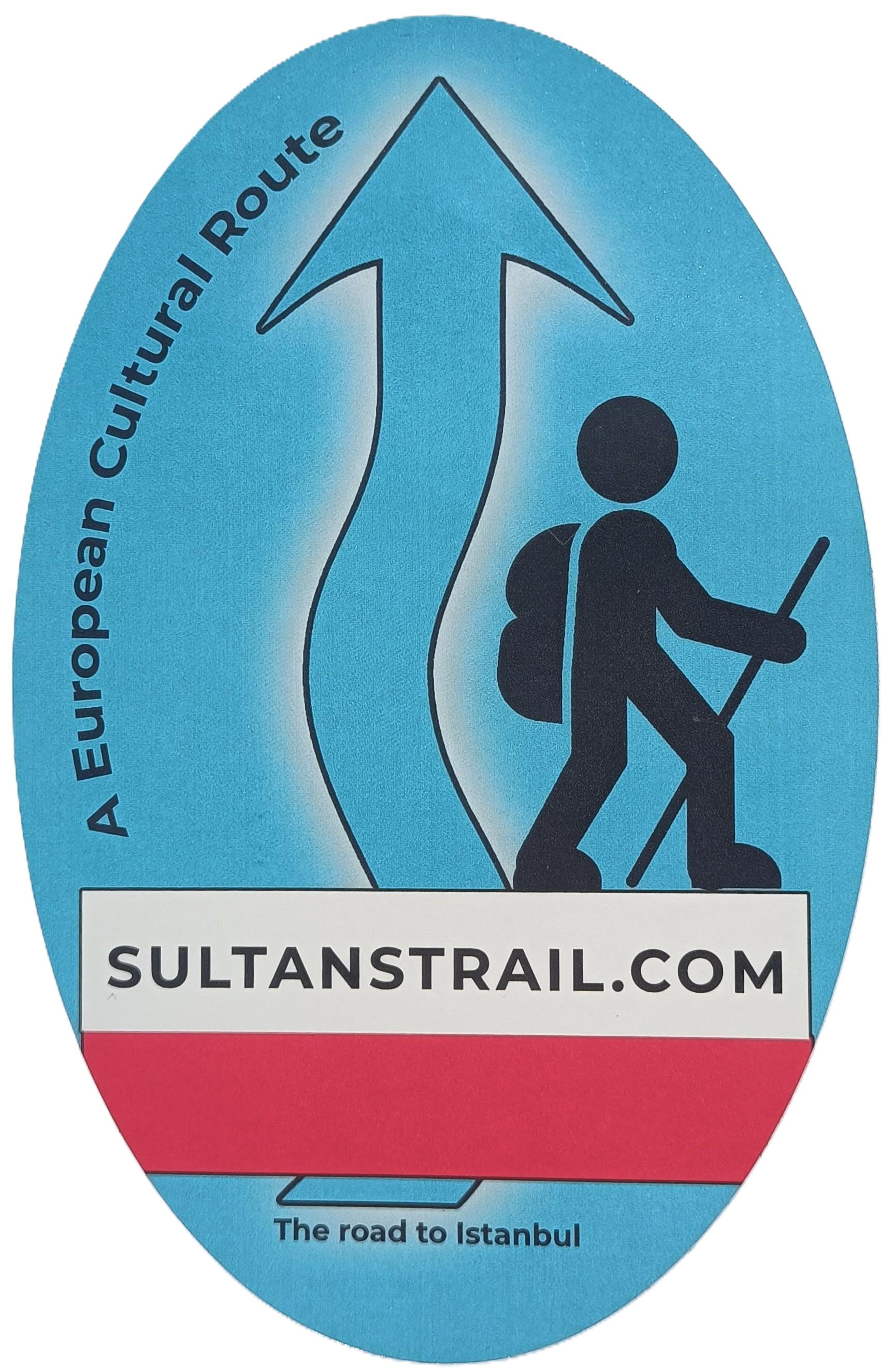
Sultans Trail hiking sticker

Austria Main route: Vienna-Simmering, Schwechat, Rauchenwarth, Trautmannsdorf an der Leitha, Wilfleinsdorf, Bruck an der Leitha, Rohrau, Petronell-Carnuntum, Hainburg an der Donau, Wolfsthal.

Austria – Purbach route (under development): Wien-Simmering, Schwechat, Rauchenwarth, Trautmannsdorf an der Leitha, Sommerein, Breitenbrunn am Neusiedler See, Purbach am Neusiedler See, Donnerskirchen, Eisenstadt, St. Margarethen im Burgenland, Mörbisch am See, in Hungary Fertőrákos, Sopron, Brennbergbánya, back again in Austria, Ritzing, Lackenbach, Weppersdorf, St.Martin, Kaisersdorf, Drassmarkt, Weingraben, Karl, Oberrabnitz, Piringsdorf, Mannersdorf an der Rabnitz, Klostermarienberg.

Slovakia Main route: Bratislava, Čunovo, Vojka nad Dunajom, Gabčíkovo, Malé Kosihy, Komárno, Iža, Radvaň nad Dunajom-Žitava, Radvaň nad Dunajom, Moča, Kravany nad Dunajom, Obid, Štúrovo.

Hungary Main route: Győr, Esztergom, Szentendre, Budakalász, Budapest, Százhalombatta, Székesfehérvár, Dunaföldvár, Szekszárd, Bátaszék, Mohács, Sátorhely, Udvar.

MATS Balaton route (till Mohács):: Sopron, Brennbergbánya, to Austria, Ritzing, Lackenbach, Weppersdorf, St.Martin, Kaisersdorf, Drassmarkt, Weingraben, Karl, Oberrabnitz, Piringsdorf, Mannersdorf an der Rabnitz, Klostermarienberg, back to Hungary Köszeg, Sárvár, Sümeg, Keszthely, Szuliman, Csertő, Szigetvár, Pécs, Mohács, Sátorhely, Udvar.

Croatia Main route: Topolje, Draž, Podolje, Popovac, Beli Manastir, Karanac, Kneževi Vinogradi, Grabovac, Darda, Osijek, Đakovo, Vinkovci, Vukovar, Šarengrad, Opatovac, Ilok.

Serbia Main route: Bački Breg, Bezdan, Bački Monoštor, Sombor, Apatin, Bač, Bačka Palanka, Novi Sad, Petrovaradin, Sremski Karlovci, Stari Slankamen, Stari Banovci, Novi Banovci, Zemun, Belgrade, Grocka, Smederevo, Smederevska Palanka, Svilajnac, Despotovac, Paraćin, Kruševac, Niška Banja, Niš, Bela Palanka, Pirot, Dimitrovgrad.

Bulgaria Main route: Kalotina, Dragoman, Sofia, Vitosha, Samokov, Rila Monastery, Rila, Velingrad, Borino, Trigrad, Mugla, Smoljan, Madan, Ardino, Kardzjali, Madzharovo, Ivaylovgrad.

Bulgaria alternative route (from Sofia to Edirne, through the Maritsa Valley): Sofia, Novi Han, Ihtiman, Pazardzhik, Stamboliyski, Plovdiv, Sadovo, Parvomay, Mineralni Bani, Haskovo, Harmanli, Lyubimets, Svilengrad.

Greece Main route (all located in East Macedonia and Thrace): Ormenio, Dikaia, Marasia, Kastanies.

Turkey Main route: Karaağaç, Edirne, Hıdırağa, Ortakça, Kavaklı, Yağcılı, Süloğlu, Büyük Gerdelli, Dolhan, Paşayeri, Koyunbaba, Kırklareli, Kızılcıkdere, Üsküpdere, Karıncak, Kaynarca, Pınarhisar, Poyralı, Doğanca, Develi, Vize, Okçular, Evrenli, Çakıllı, Kavacık, Saray, Küçük Yoncalı, Safaalan, Binkılıç, Aydınlar, Yaylacık, Gümüşpınar, İhsaniye, Akalan, Dağyenice, Boyalık, Dursunköy, Pirinçci, Eyüpsultan, Fatih, Süleymaniye Mosque, and Topkapı Palace in Istanbul.

== Books ==
- Journal of Suleiman the Magnificent during 1. siege of Vienna in German
- Sultan's Trail wandelgids – Wandelen in Thracië. Sedat Çakır, 2011. ISBN 978-94-90787-02-8. Dutch Language guide book of Turkish part of Sultans Trail.
- Das ist kein Spaziergang. Auf dem Sultans Trail zu Fuss von Wien nach Istanbul. Martin Zinggl, Knesebeck Verlag, 2025. ISBN 978-3-95728-857-8. Account of the author's journey in 2025 in response to a personal crisis, (in German).
