= Pilgrimage (TV series) =

British TV series (2018–)

Pilgrimage is a BBC Two television series following celebrities from different faiths trekking together as a group (assembled for the show) on a historical pilgrimage. Along the way they engage in interfaith dialogue.

== Series overview ==
Season	Title	Episodes	Originally released	
Season	Title	Episodes	First released	Last released
1	The Road to Santiago	3	2018	2018
2	The Road to Rome	3	2019	2019
3	The Road to Istanbul	3	2020	2020
4	The Road to the Scottish Isles	3	2022	2022
5	The Road through Portugal	3	2023	2023
6	The Road through North Wales	3	2024	2024
7	The Road through the Alps	3	2025	2025
8	The Road to Holy Island	3	2026	2026

== Series cast ==
The narrator for all eight series is Lee Ingleby.

=== The Road to Santiago (2018) ===
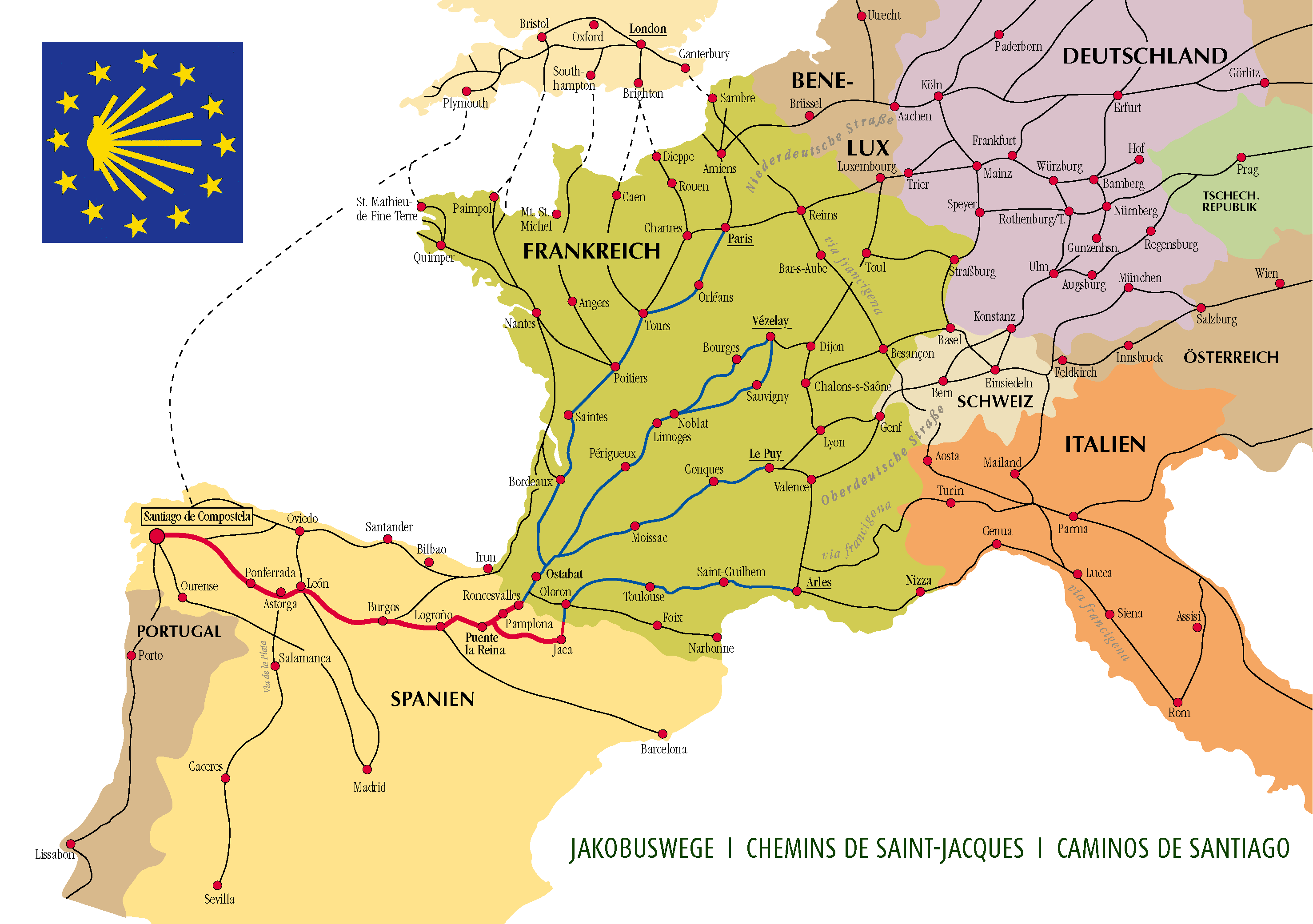
Camino de Santiago

Following Camino de Santiago.

- Neil Morrissey (humanism, atheist)
- Debbie McGee (lapsed Catholic)
- Ed Byrne (humanism, atheist)
- Heather Small (Christian)
- Kate Bottley (Anglican priest)
- Raphael Rowe (non-believer)
- JJ Chalmers (Presbyterian)

=== The Road to Rome (2019) ===
Map of the Via Francigena

Following Via Francigena to the Vatican for an audience with Pope Francis.

- Les Dennis (non-religious)
- Lesley Joseph (non-observant Jewish)
- Brendan Cole (atheist)
- Stephen K. Amos (atheist)
- Katy Brand (questioning Evangelical Christian)
- Greg Rutherford (lapsed Jehovah's Witness, non-religious)
- Dana Rosemary Scallon (Catholic)
- Mehreen Baig (Muslim)

=== The Road to Istanbul (2020) ===
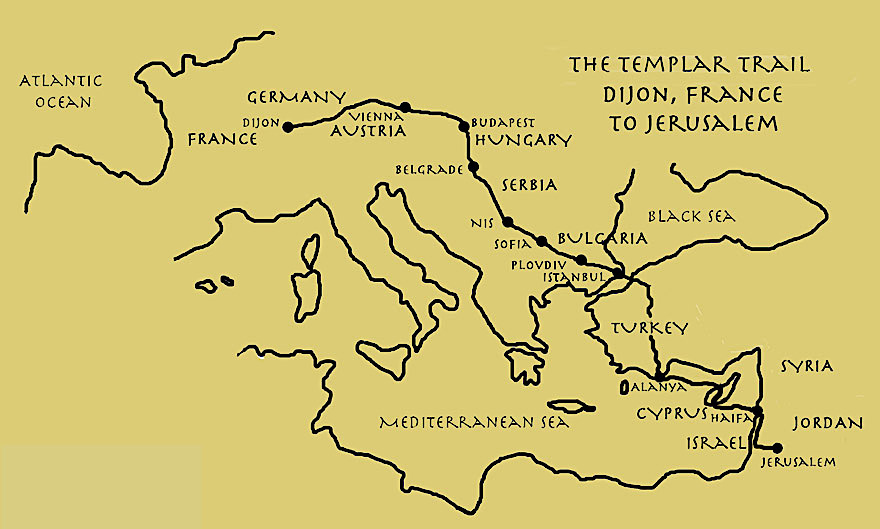
The Templar Trail, part of which is also between Vienna and Istanbul

Following the Sultans Trail to Istanbul.

- Adrian Chiles (Catholic convert)
- Edwina Currie (lapsed Orthodox Jew)
- Fatima Whitbread (Christian)
- Dom Joly (atheist)
- Pauline McLynn (atheist)
- Mim Shaikh (Muslim)
- Amar Latif (non-practising Muslim)

=== The Road to the Scottish Isles (2022) ===
Following Hiberno-Scottish mission.

- Laurence Llewelyn-Bowen (pagan)
- Monty Panesar (Sikh)
- Louisa Clein (Jewish)
- Nick Hewer (Agnostic)
- Scarlett Moffatt (Anglican)
- Shazia Mirza (Muslim)
- Will Bayley (lapsed Anglican)

=== The Road through Portugal (2023) ===
Map of the Fátima Ways, showing the northern way (Portuguese)

Following the northern route of the Fátima Way.

- Nabil Abdulrashid (Muslim)
- Millie Knight (non-practising Anglican)
- Shane Lynch (born-again Pentecostal Christian)
- Vicky Pattison (Agnostic)
- Su Pollard (Anglican)
- Bobby Seagull (Catholic)
- Rita Simons (Jewish)

=== The Road through North Wales (2024) ===
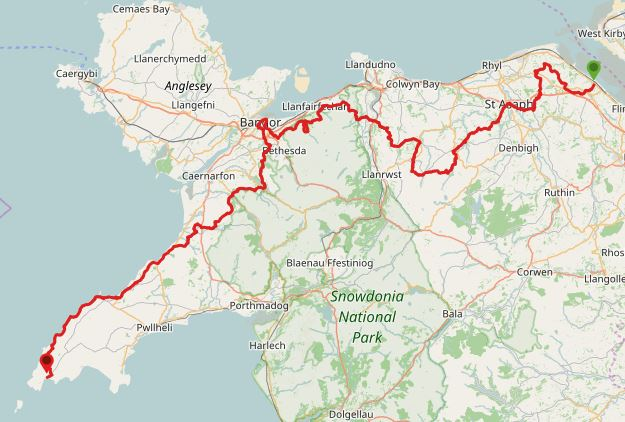
The route of the North Wales Pilgrim's Way

Following the North Wales Pilgrim's Way.

- Eshaan Akbar (lapsed Muslim)
- Amanda Lovett (Catholic)
- Spencer Matthews (non-practising Anglican)
- Christine McGuinness (non-religious)
- Tom Rosenthal (areligious)
- Sonali Shah (Jain)
- Michaela Strachan (faith in the natural world)

=== The Road through the Alps (2025) ===
Following a revived medieval route, until the Einsiedeln Abbey, in Switzerland.

- Harry Clark (Catholic)
- Helen Lederer (believer in God)
- Jay McGuiness (Agnostic)
- Jeff Brazier (spiritual)
- Daliso Chaponda (multi-religious)
- Stef Reid (Christian)
- Nelufar Hedayat (Muslim)

=== The Road to Holy Island (2026) ===
Following a pilgrim route to Holy Island, including part of St Cuthbert's Way.

- Ashley Banjo (Christian)
- Hermione Norris (Pantheist)
- Tasha Ghouri (Atheist)
- Hasan Al-Habib (Muslim)
- Jayne Middlemiss (Spiritual)
- Ashley Blaker (Agnostic and former Orthodox Jew)
- Patsy Kensit (“À la carte” Catholic)

=== (Route to be confirmed) (2027) ===
- Shabaz Ali (Muslim)
- Mhairi Black (lapsed Catholic)
- Janet Ellis (Humanist)
- Jay Foreman (lapsed Jewish, atheist)
- Leigh Francis (Atheist)
- Ferne McCann (Christian)
- Nina Wadia (Zoroastrian)
