= Fátima Ways =

Pilgrimage routes to Fátima, Portugal

The Sanctuary of Fátima is one of the most important international pilgrimage centers of the Catholic Church

The Fátima Ways (Portuguese: Caminhos de Fátima) are several marked routes taken by pilgrims across Portugal, heading to the Sanctuary of Our Lady of Fátima, located in Cova da Iria, in Fátima. Developed and coordinated by the National Culture Centre (CNC) in partnership with the Sanctuary of Fátima and various municipal councils, these modern itineraries were established to offer a safer, spiritually enriching alternative to the heavily trafficked highways traditionally used by pilgrims.

== History ==
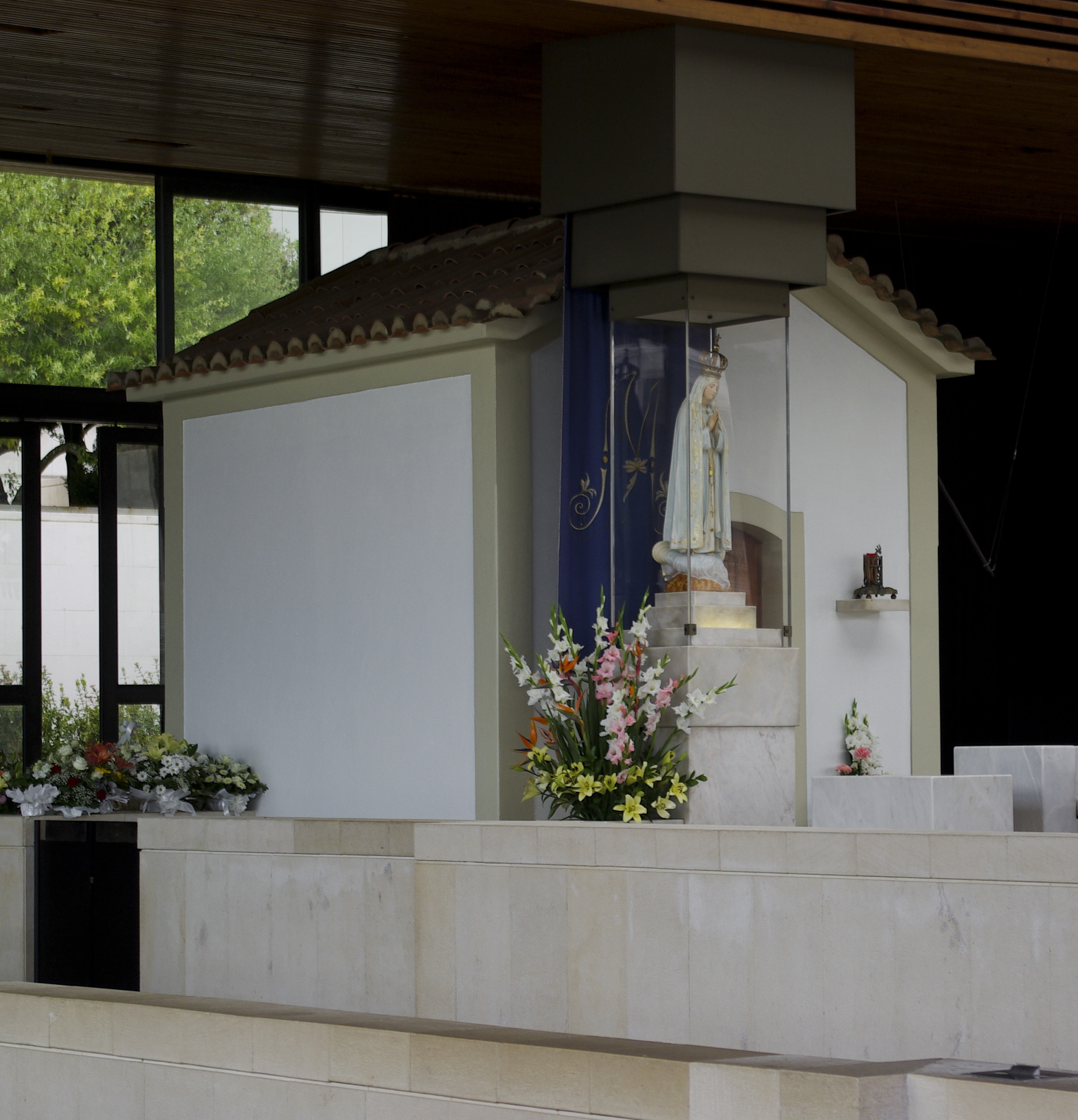
The Chapel of the Apparitions

The Sanctuary of Fátima in Cova da Iria is one of the largest international Marian pilgrimage centers of the Roman Catholic Church. Since the 18th century, many pilgrims traveled to Fátima to visit the Sanctuary of Our Lady of Ortiga. However, since 1917, the year of the Fátima apparitions, from May to October, the influx increased significantly, primarily to visit the Sanctuary of Our Lady of Fátima in Cova da Iria, as well as the site of the apparitions of the Angel of Peace in Valinhos, near Aljustrel.

Since the early 20th century, regular pilgrimages to the Chapel of the Apparitions (Capelinha das Aparições) became a popular experience of faith. Pilgrims would set out on foot, carrying all their belongings. They walked along unmarked rural roads and fields, relying entirely on the hospitality of local residents for food, water, and shelter. With modern development, paved roads and motor vehicle support became widespread. Many pilgrims began walking along main roads accompanied by logistics vehicles, trading the tranquil experience of rural paths for a faster, though often less safe, arrival at the Sanctuary.

In 1998, the National Culture Centre (Portuguese: Centro Nacional de Cultura - CNC) registered the Caminhos de Fátima logo with the National Institute of Industrial Property (INPI) to develop cultural itineraries. Initiated by Helena Vaz da Silva and Gonçalo Ribeiro Telles, the Caminho do Tejo (Tagus Way) was created, featuring blue landmarks and arrows connecting Lisbon to Fátima, primarily through countryside paths.

The Association of Friends of the Ways of Fátima (Portuguese: Associação de Amigos dos Caminhos de Fátima) was founded in 2008. This non-profit association carries out practical fieldwork, including painting over 4,000 wayfinding arrows in Portugal, maintaining a pilgrim information website, assisting in pilgrimage preparation, issuing pilgrim credentials, organizing group walks, training pilgrim guides, and hosting pilgrims at the Porto da Luz hostel.

In May 2015, following a rise in the number of pilgrims killed and injured in traffic accidents, national discussions were raised regarding safe alternatives to asphalt roads. A route is officially considered a "Pilgrim Way" when it is fully signposted from start to finish as a safe path.

=== Main pilgrimage routes ===
These are the main pilgrimage routes of the Fátima Ways:

Map of the Fátima Ways by the Associação de Amigos dos Caminhos de Fátima (Portuguese)

- Tagus Way (Caminho do Tejo): Connects Lisbon to the Sanctuary of Fátima (141 km). The route begins at Parque das Nações in Lisbon and passes through Póvoa de Santa Iria, Alverca, Alhandra, Vila Franca de Xira, Vila Nova da Rainha, Azambuja, Valada, Ómnias, Santarém, Azoia de Baixo, Advagar, Santos, Arneiro de Milhariças, Monsanto, Minde, and Giesteira.
- Northern Way (Caminho do Norte): Probably the most known, it connects Valença (on the Spanish border) or Santiago de Compostela to Fátima (225 km). This route follows the Camino de Santiago in reverse order until it reaches Ansião, where it branches off toward Caxarias. In October 2014, the Association of Friends of the Ways of Fátima fully mapped and signposted this route with 722 new arrows, resulting in detailed georeferenced data.
- Eastern Way (Caminho Nascente): Connects Tomar to Fátima (29.4 km). Opened and georeferenced in April 2015, this short route was designed for Camino de Santiago pilgrims visiting Tomar who also wish to visit Fátima, or vice versa.
- Western Way (Caminho Poente): Connects Nazaré to Fátima (53.2 km). Opened in August 2016, it features bidirectional marking and is widely considered the most demanding yet scenic of the countryside routes. Walking the Nazaré–Fátima direction is physically harder than the reverse route.
- Carmelite Route (Rota Carmelita): Starts at the Carmel of Santa Teresa in Coimbra, where Sister Lúcia lived. This 111 km trail runs through the municipalities of Coimbra, Condeixa-a-Nova, Penela, Ansião, Alvaiázere, and Ourém.
