= Amar Latif =

British actor and director

Amar Latif OBE
- Born: December 1974 (age 51); Glasgow, Scotland
- Occupations: Entrepreneur, television presenter
- Years active: 2005–present
- Website: amarlatif.com

Amar Latif OBE (born December 1974) is a Scottish entrepreneur, television personality and traveller. His blindness is due to the incurable eye condition retinitis pigmentosa. By his late teens, he had 95% sight loss.

== Early life and education ==
Born and raised in Glasgow to Pakistani parents in December 1974, Latif gained a Bachelor of Science in Mathematics, Statistics and Finance at the University of Strathclyde, spending part of his course in Canada at Queen's University in Kingston, Ontario.

== Career ==
On leaving university, he trained as an accountant, eventually becoming Head of Commercial Finance for British Telecom. In 2004, Latif founded Traveleyes, a travel agency specialising in tours for blind and partially-sighted travellers.

In 2005 Latif was a participant in the first series of the BBC Two documentary Beyond Boundaries, as one of a group of travellers with various disabilities on a trek of 220 miles (350 km) from the Atlantic to the Pacific coasts of Nicaragua.

Latif directed the 2007 Channel 4 documentary Sightseeing Blind. He has had minor acting roles in the BBC Three comedy series It's Adam and Shelley, and the BBC One drama series Love Soup. In 2007, he appeared as a special guest on the BBC Two cookery show Ready Steady Cook. In 2016, he appeared as a tour guide in Channel 4's The Last Leg Goes Down Under.

From 2017 to 2018, Latif and Anna Richardson co-presented the Channel 4 show How to Get Fit Fast, which aired for two series.

In 2019, Latif and Sara Pascoe featured in the BBC Two documentary Travelling Blind, in which they explored Istanbul's Grand Bazaar, remote Black Sea-bordering mountains, traditional summer oil wrestling festivities, traditional alpine cattle and bee farming methods and Cappadocia rock formations.

In 2020, Latif appeared as the first ever blind contestant on Celebrity MasterChef. He was eliminated in the Semi Finals with Judi Love & Phil Daniels.

In 2021, Amar was one of seven celebrity participants trekking the Sultans Trail in BBC One's Pilgrimage: The Road to Istanbul.

== Awards and recognition ==
Latif won the 2005 Outstanding Young Business Entrepreneur of the World and Outstanding Young Person of the UK, both awarded by the Junior Chamber International; the 2006 One Vision Man of the Year; and the University of Strathclyde's 2006 Alumnus of the Year award. In 2007, he was presented with the inaugural Stelios Disabled Entrepreneur Award, presented by EasyJet founder Sir Stelios Haji-Ioannou in partnership with the charity Leonard Cheshire Disability.

A 2018 episode of the BBC documentary series River Walks, presented by Latif, was awarded both the Single Documentary category at the 2019 Royal Television Society Yorkshire Centre Awards and the Best Documentary award at the 2019 O2 Media Awards for Yorkshire and The Humber.

In July 2020 Latif was appointed as one of the first two celebrity patrons of SeeAbility, a charity working with people with learning disabilities, autism and sight loss.

Latif was appointed Officer of the Order of the British Empire (OBE) in the 2023 Birthday Honours for services to the visually impaired and entrepreneurship.

In April 2023, Latif was announced as the president of The Ramblers, succeeding DJ and writer Stuart Maconie.
