= Judith Hamer =

British wheelchair basketball player

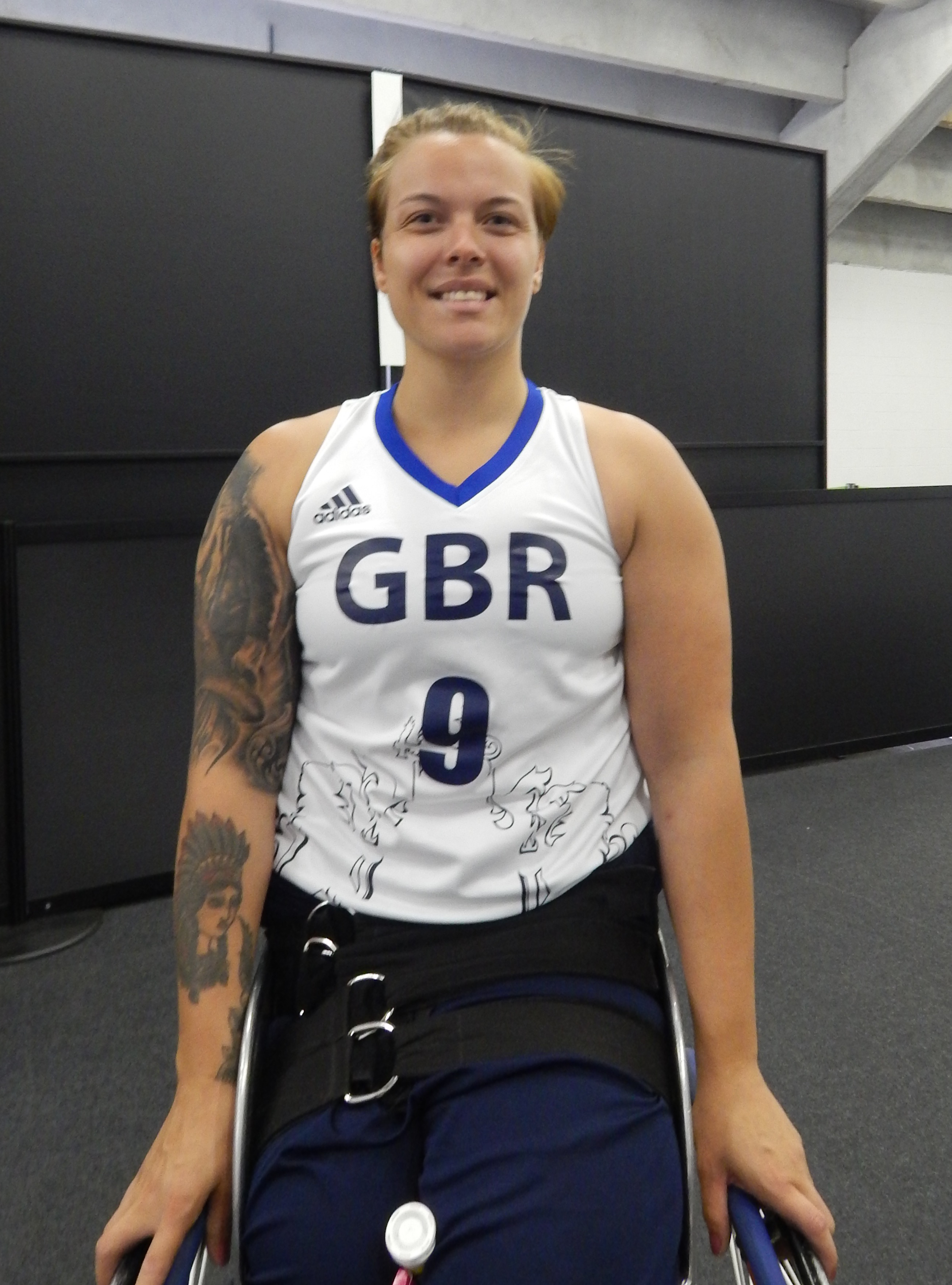
- Judith Hamer at the 2016 Paralympic Games in Rio de Janeiro

Personal information
- Nationality: Great Britain
- Born: 3 December 1990 (age 35) Plymouth, Devon, England
- Height: 165 cm (5 ft 5 in)
- Weight: 70 kg (11 st 0 lb; 154 lb)

Sport
- Country: Great Britain
- Sport: Wheelchair basketball
- Disability class: 4.0
- Event: Women's team
Medal record
Women's wheelchair basketball
Representing Great Britain
World Championships
Silver medal – second place	2018 Hamburg	Team
European Championships
Silver medal – second place	2025 Sarajevo	Team
Bronze medal – third place	2009 Stoke Mandeville	Team
Bronze medal – third place	2011 Nazareth	Team
Bronze medal – third place	2013 Frankfurt	Team
Bronze medal – third place	2015 Worcester	Team
Bronze medal – third place	2017 Tenriffe	Team

Judith Hamer (born 3 December 1990) is a 4.0 point British wheelchair basketball player who represented Great Britain at the 2012 and 2016 Paralympic Games. She won a Diana, Princess of Wales Memorial Award for bravery and trekked across the Andes Mountains in Ecuador as part of a reality television show, Beyond Boundaries.

== Biography ==
Judith Hamer was born in Plymouth on 3 December 1990, with a short thigh bone in her right leg. She could walk wearing crutches and special shoes. After some 18 operations over thirteen years to attempt to correct it, and with her GCSE exams approaching, she told the doctors that enough was enough. In 2006 she had her right leg amputated below the knee. She won a Diana, Princess of Wales Memorial Award for bravery. A few months later, she hiked across the Andes Mountains in Ecuador as part of a reality television show, Beyond Boundaries.

The idea of playing sport had not been uppermost in her mind, but in 2007 she became interested in wheelchair basketball. She attended a UK Sport Talent Day, and began playing for a local club in Exeter, the Otters in 2007, as a 4.0 point player. The Lord's Taverners gave her a £2,000 custom-made wheelchair basketball chair. in 2009, she made her international debut at the Paralympic World Cup. She played with the national side at the European championships, at which they won bronze. They went on to win bronze again in 2011, 2013 and 2015.

Hamer won bronze at the Women's U25 World Championships in St Catharines, Ontario in 2011, and silver at the Women's U25 European Championships in 2013. She was also part of the team at the 2012 Paralympic Games in London. "I think we may be at our best for Rio in 2016," she told reporters beforehand, "but 2012 will be the biggest thing I ever do, and I won't be able to play at a home Paralympics ever again."

The British women's wheelchair basketball team came 7th in London; but Hamer, now a biochemistry student at the University of Worcester, was selected as part of the team for the 2016 Paralympic Games. The British team produced its best ever performance at the Paralympics, making it to the semi-finals, but lost to the United States, and then the bronze medal match to the Netherlands.

== Personal life ==
Hamer is engaged to Lauren Rowles, a parasport rower.

== Achievements ==
- 2009: Bronze at European Wheelchair Basketball Championship (Stoke Mandeville, United Kingdom)
- 2010: Sixth at 2010 Wheelchair Basketball World Championship (Birmingham, United Kingdom)
- 2011: Bronze at European Wheelchair Basketball Championship (Nazareth, Israel)
- 2012: Seventh at 2012 Paralympic Games (London, United Kingdom)
- 2013: Bronze at European Championships (Frankfurt, Germany)
- 2014: Fifth at the World Wheelchair Basketball Championship (Toronto, Canada)
- 2015: Bronze at the European Championships (Worcester, England)
- 2016: Fourth at the 2016 Summer Paralympics (Rio de Janeiro, Brazil)
- 2017: Bronze at the European Championships (Tenerife, Spain)
- 2018: Silver at the 2018 Wheelchair Basketball World Championship (Hamburg, Germany)
