= Meyrieu-les-Étangs =

- Commune
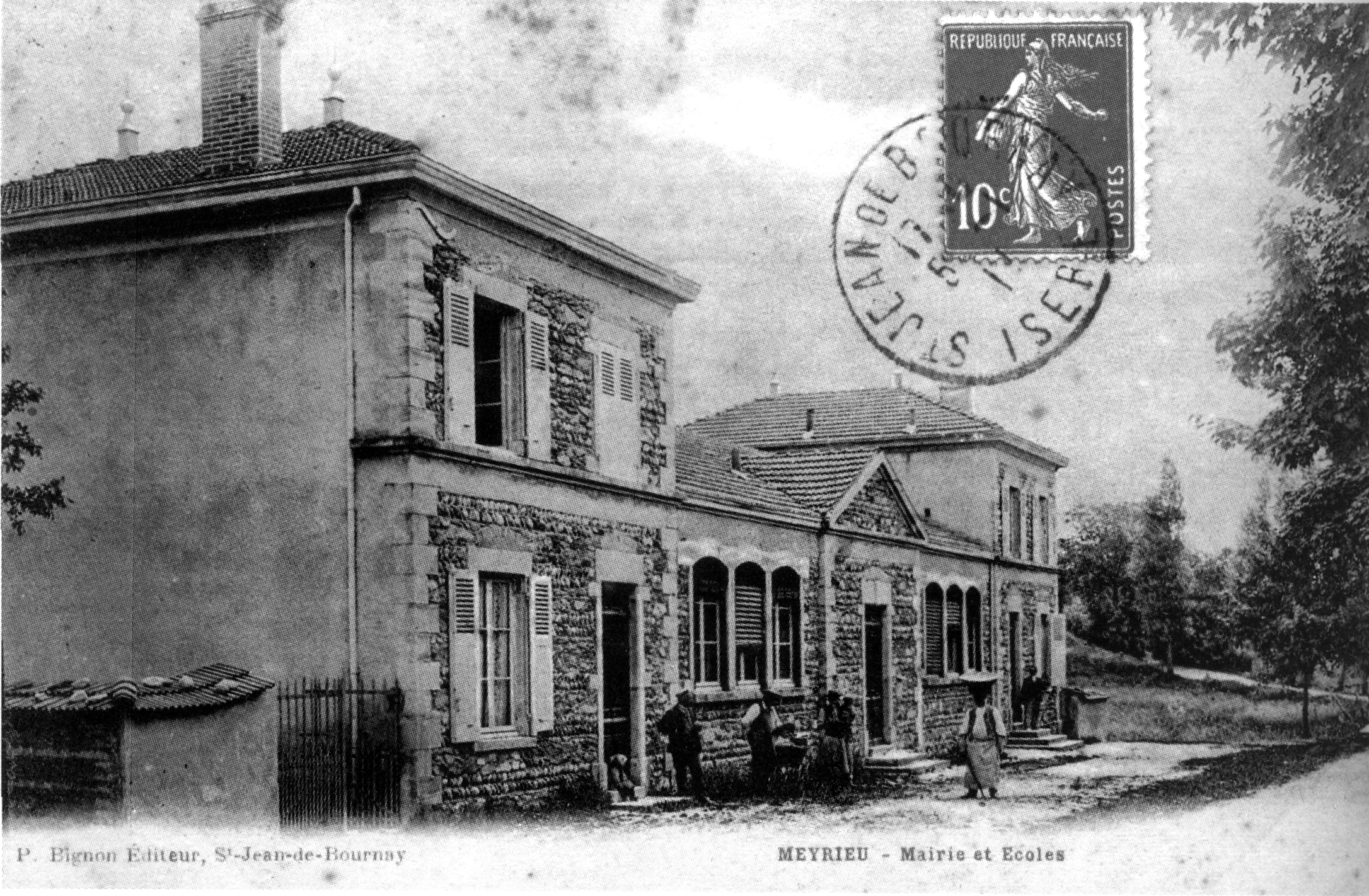
- The town hall and schools in 1913
- Location of Meyrieu-les-Étangs
- Location within France Location within Auvergne-Rhône-Alpes
- Coordinates: 45°30′51″N 5°12′02″E
- Country: France
- Region: Auvergne-Rhône-Alpes
- Department: Isère
- Arrondissement: Vienne
- Canton: L'Isle-d'Abeau

Government
  - Mayor (2020–2026): Alain Couturier
- Area^{1}: 8.54 km^{2} (3.30 sq mi)
- Elevation: 390 m (1,280 ft)
- Highest elevation: 527 m (1,729 ft)
- Lowest elevation: 410 m (1,350 ft)
- Population (2023): 1,024
  - Density: 120/km^{2} (311/sq mi)
- Time zone: UTC+01:00 (CET)
  - Summer (DST): UTC+02:00 (CEST)
- INSEE/Postal code: 38231 /38440
- ^{1} French Land Register data, which excludes lakes, ponds, glaciers > 1 km^{2} (0.386 sq mi or 247 acres) and river estuaries.

Meyrieu-les-Étangs (French pronunciation: [meʁjø le.z‿etɑ̃]) is a commune in the Isère department in southeastern France.

== Populagion ==
Historical population
Year	Pop.	±% p.a.
1968	423	—
1975	416	−0.24%
1982	495	+2.51%
1990	551	+1.35%
1999	725	+3.10%
2007	778	+0.89%
2012	898	+2.91%
2017	1,015	+2.48%
2023	1,024	+0.15%
Source: INSEE

== Twin towns ==
Meyrieu-les-Étangs is twinned with:

- Piringsdorf, Austria, since 1995

== See also ==
- Communes of the Isère department
