= Brandon Wilson (writer) =

American travel writer and explorer

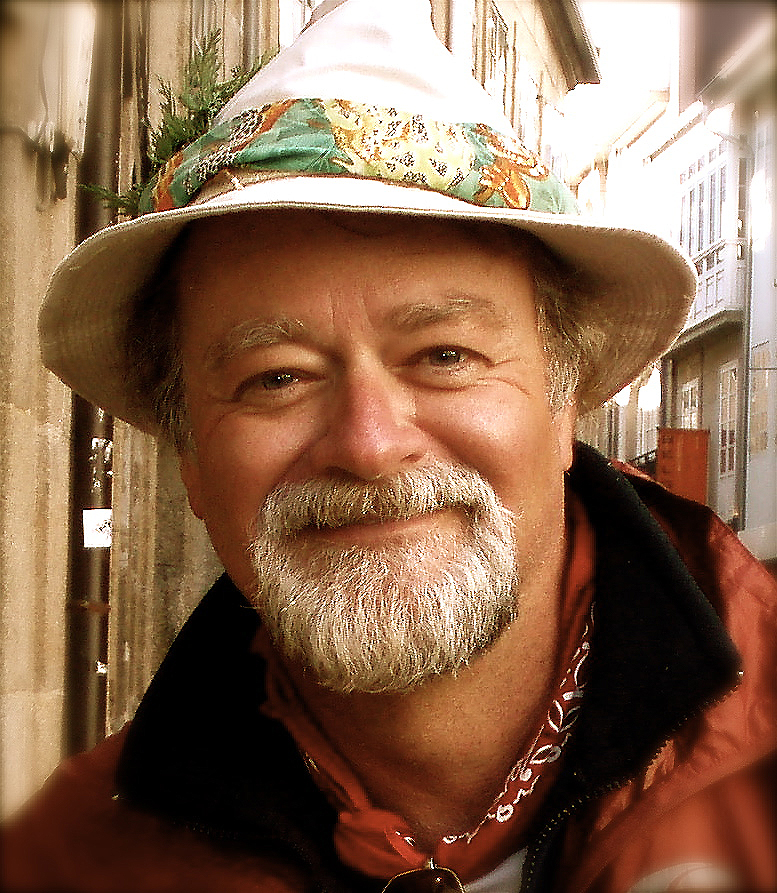
- Wilson in Santiago de Compostela, 2007
- Born: October 2, 1953 (age 72); Sewickley, Pennsylvania
- Education: American Academy of Dramatic Arts, NYC, 1974
- Alma mater: University of North Carolina, Chapel Hill, B.A., 1973
- Occupations: Writer, explorer, peace walker
- Writing career
- Genre: Travel writing

Brandon Wilson (born October 2, 1953) is an American explorer and author of non-fiction travel narratives. A fellow of the Explorers Club, he has written books and essays about his extensive travels on foot as a pilgrim. In 2006, he pioneered the Templar Trail, recreating the route of the First Crusade from France to Jerusalem, as a pilgrimage path of peace.

== Early life and education ==
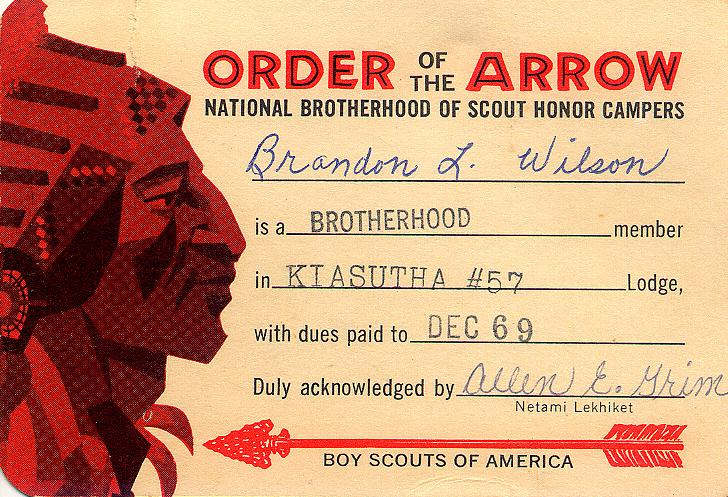
Wilson's Order of the Arrow certificate

Wilson was born in Sewickley, Pennsylvania on October 2, 1953. He grew up in Moon Township, Pennsylvania, a suburb of Pittsburgh, Pennsylvania. When he was 14, he began contributing articles to two local newspapers (Coraopolis Record and Moon Bulletin).

He attended Sewickley Academy, graduated Moon Area High School (1971) and the University of North Carolina at Chapel Hill where he was a member of Carolina Playmakers, matriculating with a Bachelor of Arts in communications and dramatic arts in 1973. Wilson then attended the American Academy of Dramatic Arts, New York City (1974).

== Career ==
=== Media ===
Wilson began his career with the Seattle Repertory Theatre as video director for the play Made for TV (1975). In 1981, Wilson moved to Utqiaġvik, Alaska (formerly Barrow), as the assistant to the Iñupiat mayor, where he reported on Arctic life for the Fairbanks Daily News-Miner among others. After relocating to Anchorage, Alaska, Wilson continued writing news and cultural articles for statewide newspapers while managing promotions with the Anchorage Convention & Visitor's Bureau. Wilson relocated to Honolulu, Hawaii in 1986, where he was a senior copywriter at an ad agency until 1989 when he began a creative consultancy specializing in the travel industry, while writing adventure articles for national media.

=== Exploration ===
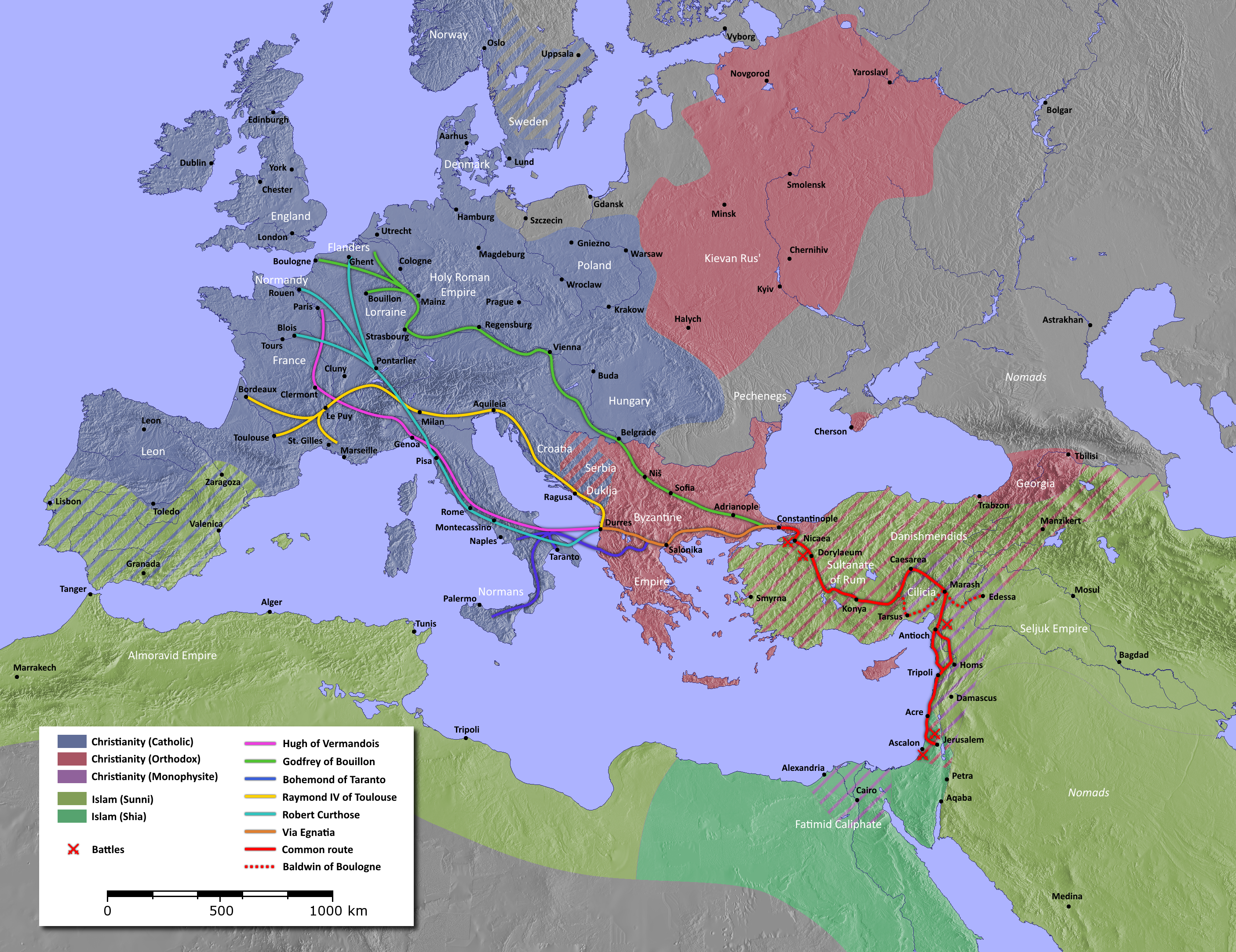
Map of the First Crusade

In 1990, after having lived in Hawaii for several years, Wilson and his wife, Cheryl Keefe, began a 17-country African transect from London to Cape Town. Their seven-month safari is recounted in their 2005 non-fiction travelogue, Dead Men Don't Leave Tips: Adventures X Africa. The book received positive reviews from Midwest Book Review and The Maui News.

In 1992, after training at high elevations in Vail, Colorado, Wilson and his wife set off to walk a 1,000 kilometres (620 mi) pilgrimage path from Lhasa, Tibet to Kathmandu, Nepal. Upon arrival in Kathmandu, the Wilsons presented Tibetan prayer flags carried from Lhasa to the King of Nepal's private secretary at the Royal Palace. Wilson wrote a travelogue, Yak Butter Blues: A Tibetan Trek of Faith, which describes the trek and struggle of the Tibetan people to survive cultural genocide. The book received positive reviews from Library Journal, Midwest Book Review, and The Honolulu Advertiser. It won a 2005 IPPY Award in the travel essay category.

In 1999, Wilson learned of the Camino de Santiago, a Spanish pilgrimage trail and continued his walks for peace in the historic tradition. Over the following fifteen years, he walked several pilgrim paths throughout Europe, and in 2014 was named a Knight Hospitaller-Knight of Malta.

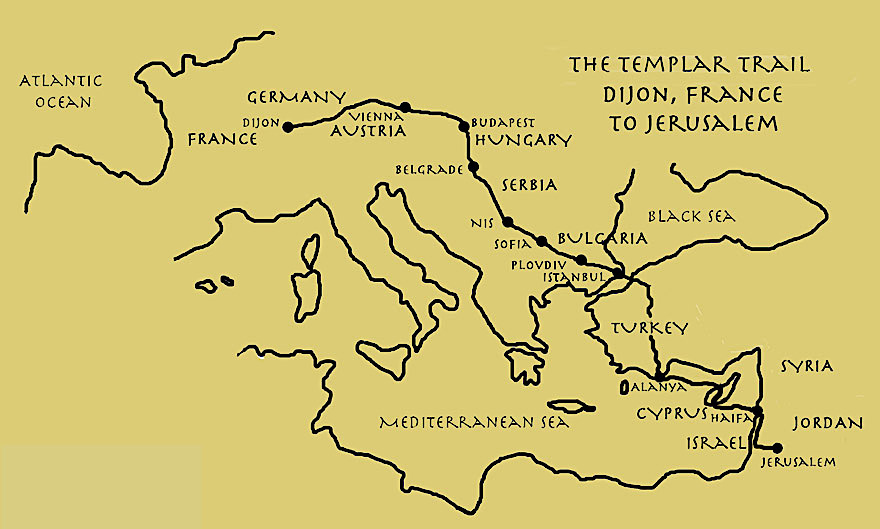
Map of the Templar Trail from France to Jerusalem, 2006

In April 2006, with the goal of establishing a modern-day pilgrimage route from Europe to Jerusalem, Wilson set off with 68-year-old Frenchman "Émile" on a 4,223 kilometres (2,624 mi), six-month from Dijon, France to Jerusalem approximating the route of Godfrey of Bouillon during the First Crusades. With the 2006 Hezbollah cross-border raid and outbreak of the 2006 Lebanon War, walking on what they named the Templar Trail became more difficult and its success uncertain. They persevered, due in part to the newspaper and television coverage they received along the way, which helped spread their message of peace. Although "Émile" fell ill and was forced to return home from Istanbul, Wilson continued, arriving in Jerusalem on September 29, 2006.

A non-fiction book recounting his journey, Along the Templar Trail: Seven Million Steps for Peace, was published in 2008. The book received positive reviews from Midwest Book Review and ForeWord Magazine. It won the "Best Travel Book" Gold Award at the 2009 Lowell Thomas Travel Journalism Awards.

From June–September 2009, Wilson and his wife traversed the high Alps for 2,400 kilometres (1,500 mi) across eight countries from Trieste to Monaco while researching a book about the Via Alpina, a new trans-European hiking network. Wilson's book about their journey, Over the Top & Back Again: Hiking X the Alps, the first book in English about a Via Alpina thru-hike (per Assoc. Via Alpina), was published in October 2010, featuring illustrations by Ken Plumb. The book received positive reviews from Library Journal, The Denver Post, and Midwest Book Review.

== Works ==
Wilson has written extensively in long and short form. His publications include the following:

=== Books ===
- Yak Butter Blues: A Tibetan Trek of Faith (Heliographica, San Francisco, 2004 ISBN 1-933037-23-7; Pilgrim's Tales, second edition, 2005) ISBN 9780977053667
- Dead Men Don't Leave Tips: Adventures X Africa (Pilgrim's Tales, 2005) ISBN 9780977053643
- Along the Templar Trail (Pilgrim's Tales, 2008) ISBN 9780977053681
- Over the Top & Back Again: Hiking X the Alps (Pilgrim's Tales, 2010) ISBN 9780977053629
- Yak Butter Blues: Una Caminata de Fe Por El Tíbet, (Pilgrim's Tales, 2010, Spanish edition, translated by Ramon Solé) ISBN 978-0-9770536-0-5
- Auf dem Templerweg: Sieben Millionen Schritte für Den Frieden (Pilgrim's Tales, 2011, German edition of "Along the Templar Trail," translated by Imke Healy) ISBN 978-0-9770536-1-2
- A Tibetan Trek of Faith (Heritage Publishers, Delhi, India, 2011) ISBN 817026278X

=== Anthology stories ===
- "Life When Hell Freezes Over" in They Lived to Tell the Tale: True Stories of Adventure from the Legendary Explorers Club (Lyons Press/Globe Pequot, 2007) ISBN 978-1592289912
- "Thoughts from Along the Peace Trail" in Wounds of War: Poets for Peace (American Star Books, 2010) ISBN 978-1451253337
- "Stories from a trek across Tibet and from the Via Alpina, an adventure across the Alps" in The Walkabout Chronicles: Epic Journeys by Foot (Sacred World Explorations, 2016) ISBN 978-1533269744
- "Metamorphosis: The Making of a Pilgrim", (also provided the introduction and photos) in The Pilgrimage Chronicles: Embrace the Quest (Sacred World Explorations, 2017) ISBN 978-0692967881
- "Reflections: an excerpt from "Along the Templar Trail: Seven Million Steps for Peace" in Hip Poetry (Blue Lake Review, 2019) ISBN 978-1090507716

=== Other writing/photography ===
- Photo essay about the Via de la Plata featured in Naïve & Abroad: Spain, Limping 600 Miles Through History by Marcus Wilder ( 2008) ISBN 978-0595493968
- Introduction to On a Donkey's Back, a collection of poetry and paintings by and about the lives of Nepalese porters, (Yileen Press, 2008) ISBN 978-0615191638

=== Exploration ===
Pilgrimage/Peace Walks:

- 1,100 kilometres (680 mi) pilgrimage path from Lhasa, Tibet to Kathmandu, Nepal with a side trek to Mt. Everest Basecamp (1992)
- 800 kilometres (500 mi) Camino de Santiago (Francés), Spain (1999, 2005)
- 1,850 kilometres (1,150 mi) Via Francigena from England to Rome, with a side trip to Assisi (first American to complete this pilgrim route, per Assoc. Via Francigena (Rome) (2000, 2002)
- 643 kilometres (400 mi) St. Olav's Way across Norway (2004)
- Founded the Templar Trail, a modern-day 4,223 kilometres (2,624 mi) pilgrimage route for peace from France to Jerusalem (2006)
- 800 kilometres (500 mi) Via de la Plata from Seville to Santiago, Spain (2007)
- 564 kilometres (350 mi) St. Olav's Way across Sweden and Norway (2014)
