= National Culture Centre =

Cultural association in Lisbon, Portugal

National Culture Centre (Portuguese: Centro Nacional de Cultura (CNC) MHIH) is a cultural association founded in 1945, and headquartered at Rua António Maria Cardoso n.º 68, in Lisbon, Portugal.

== History ==
It was created in 1945 by a group of young people who included elements of the Portuguese Youth, members of the Portuguese Catholic Action movement and supporters of the Monarchy, united for the purpose of promoting in Portugal the access to a free and multidisciplinary culture.

In the midst of Salazarism, the association became a meeting place and a place for dialogue between the various political and ideological sectors, including figures who are today a reference in Portuguese culture. Gonçalo Ribeiro Telles, Sophia de Mello Breyner, Francisco Sousa Tavares, António Alçada Batista, João Benard da Costa, Helena Vaz da Silva and Guilherme d'Oliveira Martins were leaders of the CNC, giving it the dynamics and character of a cultural institution with international projection.

Since the 25 April 1974, it has pursued a mission based on the defense of Portuguese cultural heritage, the dissemination of Portuguese culture, and the updating of relations in the world. It has a varied program, divided between exhibitions, launching of publications, colloquiums, training sessions or study trips, also developing projects in partnership with counterparts from other European countries and hosting interns and foreign artists throughout the year.

On June 9, 1995, it was made Honorary Member of the Order of Infante D. Henrique, and on May 10, 2005, it was made Honorary Member of the Order of Liberty.

The CNC belongs to several international cultural networks and is the representative entity of Europa Nostra in Portugal.

The CNC's Board is chaired by Maria Calado, the Grand Council by Guilherme d'Oliveira Martis, and the General Assembly by Gonçalo Ribeiro Telles.
