= Pirinçci =

Origin
- Language: Turkish
- Meaning: rice grower; rice trader, rice seller
- Region of origin: Turkey

Pirinçci (IPA: [piˈɾintʃdʒi]) is a Turkish surname. It is derived from the Turkish noun of Persian origin pirinç (cf. Persian: برنج (berenj)) with the meaning "rice" by adding the Turkish agentive suffix -ci and originally denoted a person either growing rice or trading in this agricultural commodity. Notable people with the surname include:

- Akif Pirinçci (born 1959), Turkish-born German writer
- Burcu Pirinçci (born 1990), Turkish female handballer
