= Piringsdorf =

- Municipality
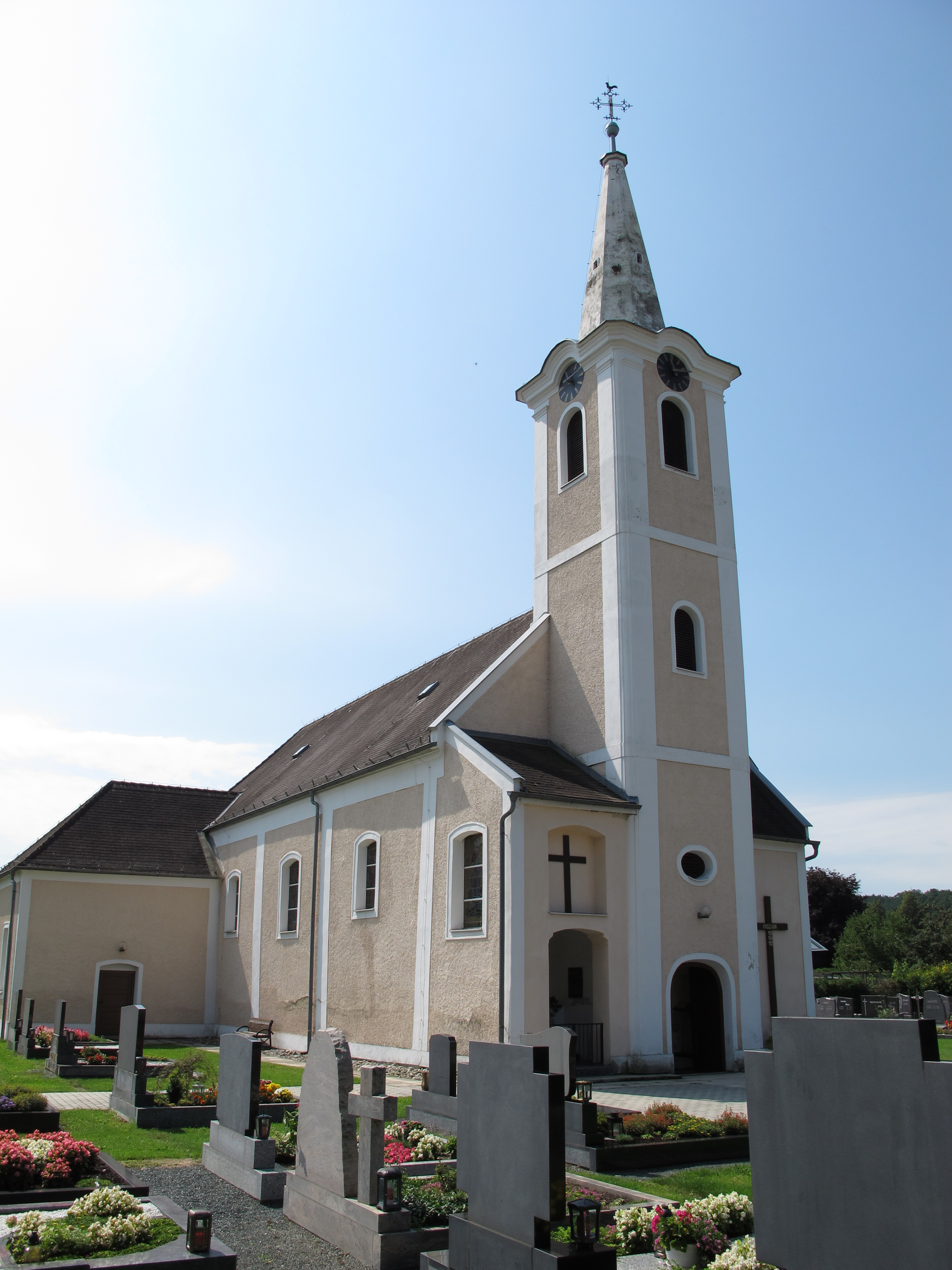
- Church of Saint John the Baptist and Saint Koloman

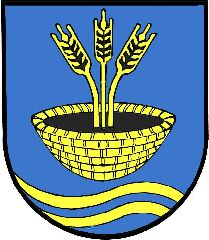
- Coat of arms

- Location within Austria
- Coordinates: 47°27′N 16°25′E
- Country: Austria
- State: Burgenland
- District: Oberpullendorf

Government
  - Mayor: Thomas Hauser (SPÖ)

Area
  - Total: 16.14 km^{2} (6.23 sq mi)

Population (2018-01-01)
  - Total: 847
  - Density: 52.5/km^{2} (136/sq mi)
- Time zone: UTC+1 (CET)
  - Summer (DST): UTC+2 (CEST)
- Postal code: 7371
- Website: www.piringsdorf.at

Piringsdorf (Croatian: Piringštof, Hungarian: Répcebónya) is a town in the district of Oberpullendorf in the Austrian state of Burgenland.

== Population ==
Historical population
Year	Pop.	±%
1869	878	—
1880	916	+4.3%
1890	840	−8.3%
1900	890	+6.0%
1910	944	+6.1%
1923	951	+0.7%
1934	949	−0.2%
1939	922	−2.8%
1951	897	−2.7%
1961	929	+3.6%
1971	906	−2.5%
1981	924	+2.0%
1991	916	−0.9%
2001	897	−2.1%
2011	856	−4.6%

== Twin towns ==
Piringsdorf is twinned with:

- Meyrieu-les-Étangs, France, since 1999
