= Kaisersdorf =

- Municipality
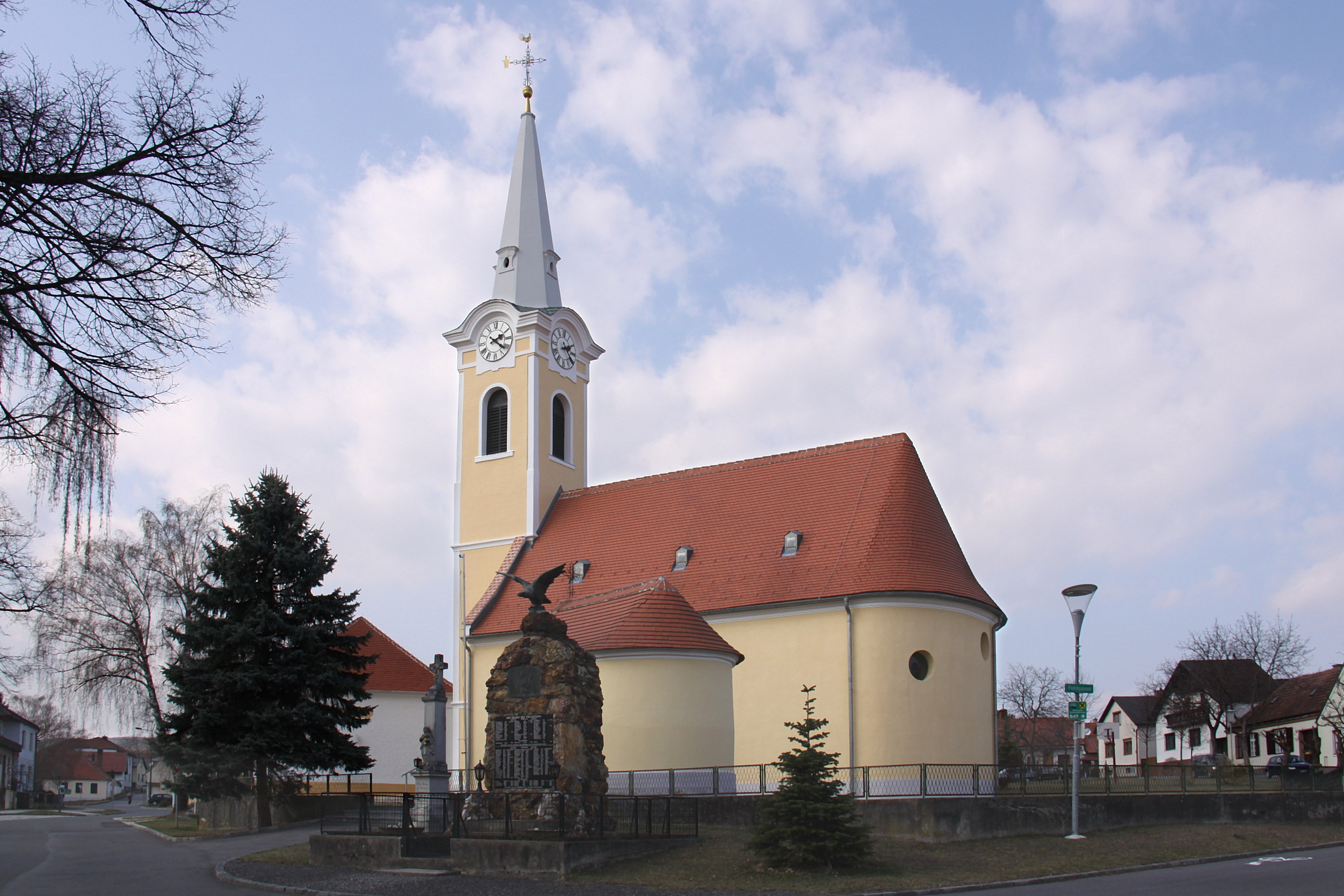
- Parish Church of Saint Nicholas

- Coat of arms

- Location within Austria
- Coordinates: 47°32′N 16°24′E
- Country: Austria
- State: Burgenland
- District: Oberpullendorf

Government
  - Mayor: Horst Egresich (SPÖ)

Area
  - Total: 12.51 km^{2} (4.83 sq mi)

Population (2018-01-01)
  - Total: 620
  - Density: 50/km^{2} (130/sq mi)
- Time zone: UTC+1 (CET)
  - Summer (DST): UTC+2 (CEST)
- Postal code: 7342

Kaisersdorf (Croatian: Kalištrof, Hungarian: Császárfalu) is a town in the district of Oberpullendorf in the Austrian state of Burgenland.

== Population ==
Historical population
Year	Pop.	±%
1869	932	—
1880	1,078	+15.7%
1890	1,095	+1.6%
1900	976	−10.9%
1910	1,019	+4.4%
1923	965	−5.3%
1934	1,050	+8.8%
1939	864	−17.7%
1951	863	−0.1%
1961	743	−13.9%
1971	684	−7.9%
1981	619	−9.5%
1991	545	−12.0%
2001	627	+15.0%
2011	595	−5.1%
