= Beyond Boundaries =

Television series

Beyond Boundaries is a reality TV series produced by Diverse Bristol for BBC Two. Each series follows a team of adventurers with disabilities as they take on some of the toughest expeditions on the planet under the guidance of ex-SAS Major Ken Hames.

== Series One – Beyond Boundaries Nicaragua ==
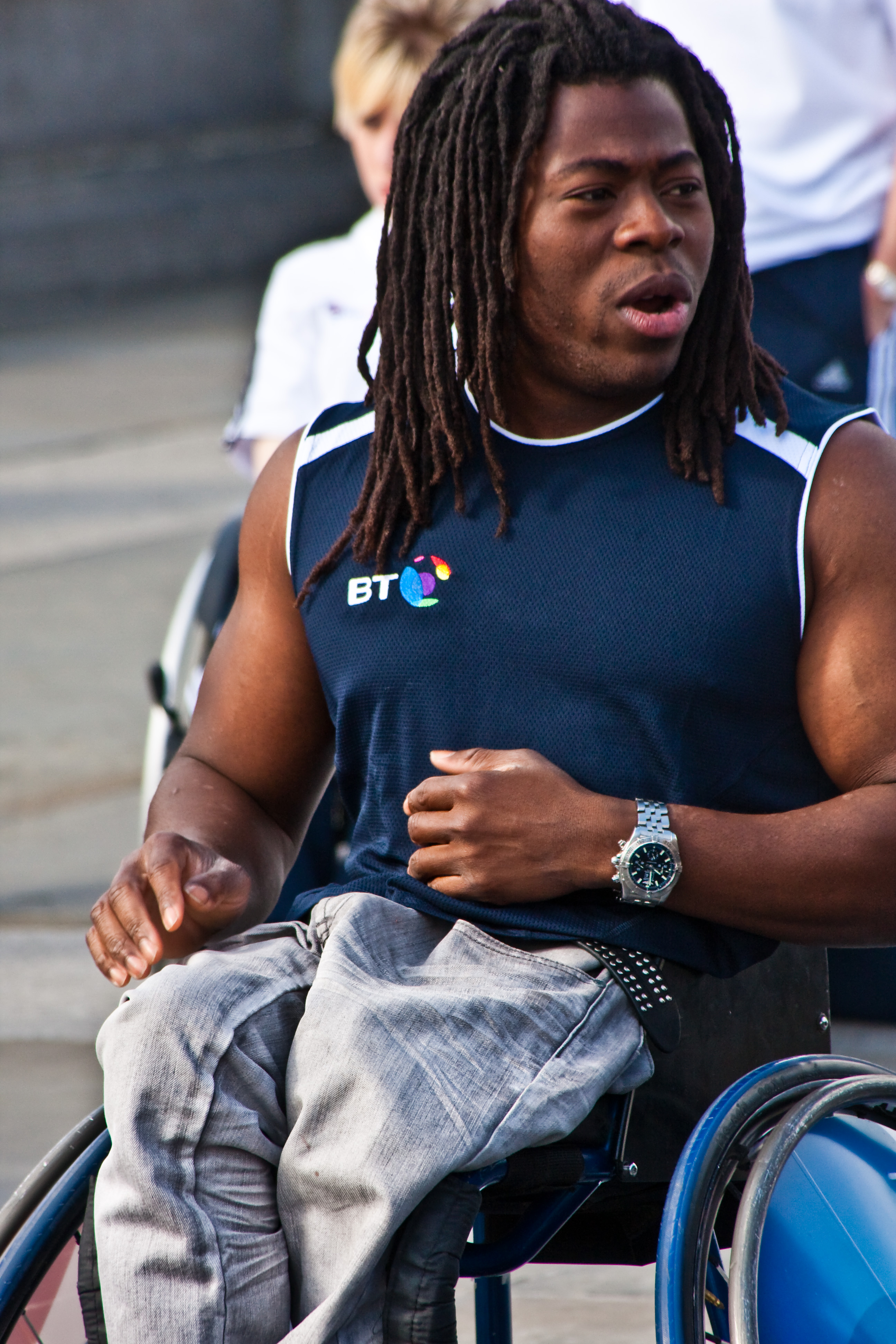
Ade Adepitan

The first series of Beyond Boundaries Nicaragua follows a group of eleven men and women, each of whom have a physical disability, as they trek across the rainforests, deserts, rivers and mountains of Nicaragua. The arduous route takes the participants from the Atlantic to the Pacific Ocean.

They start on the treacherous Mosquito Coast, escorted by armed soldiers to protect them from bandits and drug traffickers. They then make their way through a jungle and crocodile infested rivers, and climb a live volcano to make it to their finish line – the Pacific Coast. They have twenty-eight days to cross two hundred and twenty miles.

The team included Ade Adepitan, Jane Atkinson, Amar Latif, Sophie Morgan, Daryl Beeton, Warren Wolstencroft, Karl Sacks, Glenn Kirk, Lorraine Pooley, Charlie Fennel and Toby Farrar – two in wheelchairs, one deaf, one blind, one double foot amputee, two arm amputees, one with spina bifida and the other three were single leg amputees. Only seven participants finished the expedition.

This series was first transmitted on BBC Two in October 2005.

== Series Two – Beyond Boundaries: The African Challenge ==
Beyond Boundaries: The African Challenge follows a group of adventurers with disabilities on a 2,000 mile journey across continental Africa. They have to work together as a group to cross the two oldest deserts in the world, avoid lions and rhinos, and ride the world's most dangerous rapids at Victoria Falls before reaching their destination on the Skeleton Coast.

This series was first transmitted on BBC Two in October 2006.

== Series Three – Across the Andes: Beyond Boundaries ==
10 teenagers with physical disabilities cross the Andes, one of the highest mountain ranges in the world. Over a period of four weeks and 400 km, these young people will have to fight their way from the edge of the Amazon Basin, climb to over 5000m to reach the snowline on Cotopaxi, the highest active volcano in the world, and then descend to sea level, wading through miles of swamp before reaching the Pacific Ocean.They are led by ex-SAS commando Ken Hames.

This series was first transmitted on BBC Two in May 2008.
