= Weingraben =

- Municipality
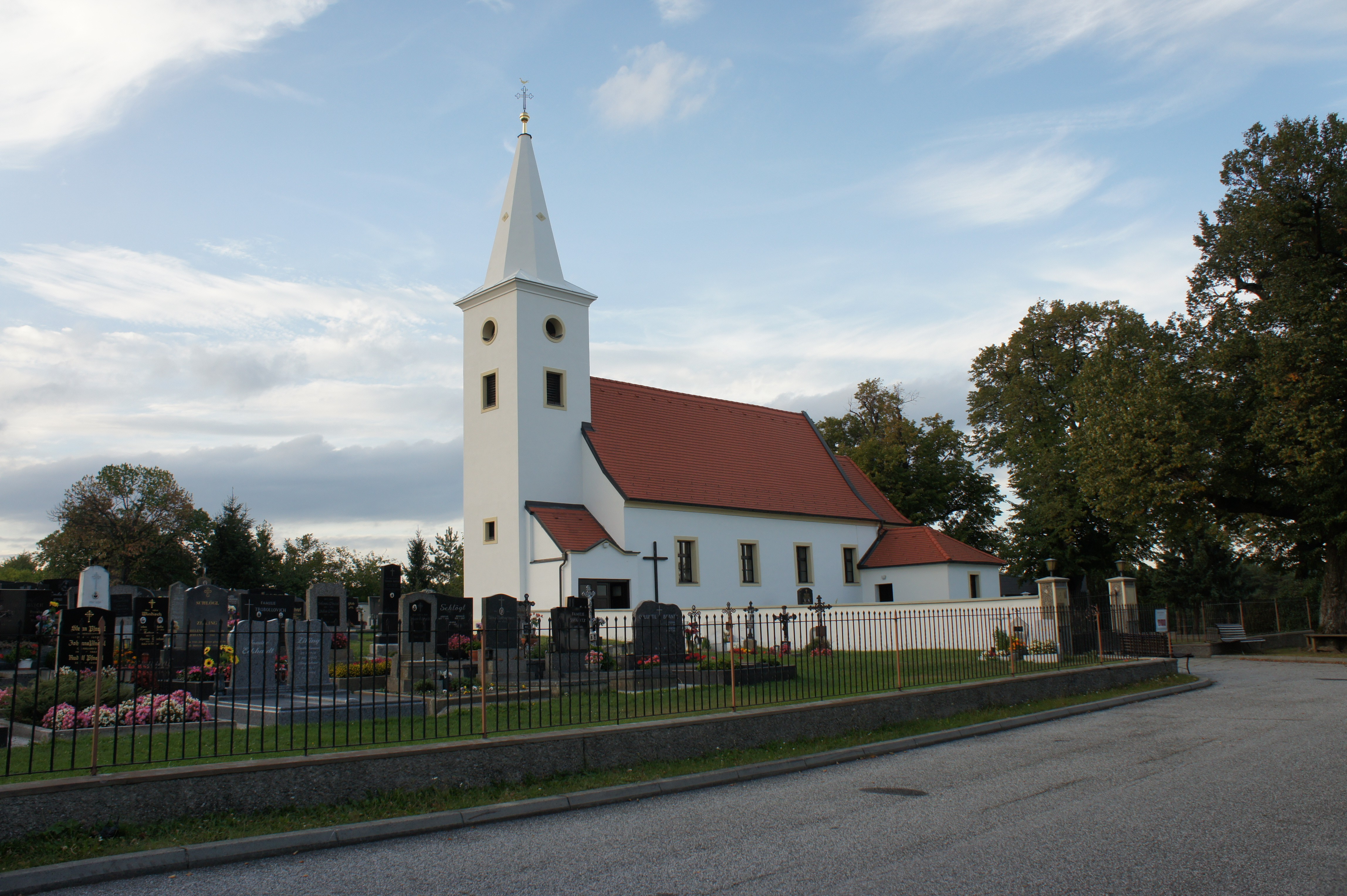
- Saint Magdalene Church

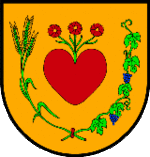
- Coat of arms

- Location within Austria
- Coordinates: 47°31′N 16°22′E
- Country: Austria
- State: Burgenland
- District: Oberpullendorf

Government
  - Mayor: Thomas Stoiber (SPÖ)

Area
  - Total: 9.22 km^{2} (3.56 sq mi)

Population (2018-01-01)
  - Total: 363
  - Density: 39.4/km^{2} (102/sq mi)
- Time zone: UTC+1 (CET)
  - Summer (DST): UTC+2 (CEST)
- Postal code: 7372

Weingraben (Croatian: Bajngrob, Hungarian: Borosd) is a town in the district of Oberpullendorf in the Austrian state of Burgenland.

== Etymology ==
Weingraben literally translates as 'ditch of wine'. In Croatian, the name is Bajngrob. The Hungarian name also refers to wine.

== Population ==
Historical population
Year	Pop.	±%
1869	444	—
1880	512	+15.3%
1890	515	+0.6%
1900	551	+7.0%
1910	570	+3.4%
1923	568	−0.4%
1934	579	+1.9%
1939	548	−5.4%
1951	550	+0.4%
1961	522	−5.1%
1971	483	−7.5%
1981	455	−5.8%
1991	419	−7.9%
2001	389	−7.2%
2011	370	−4.9%

== Sights ==
Weingraben is famous for its hiking trails. From the centre it is not far to the chapel and the water reservoir. There are many hiking trails to the mountains of Landsee. There is a small brook called Rabnitz and a farm.
