= Weppersdorf =

- Municipality
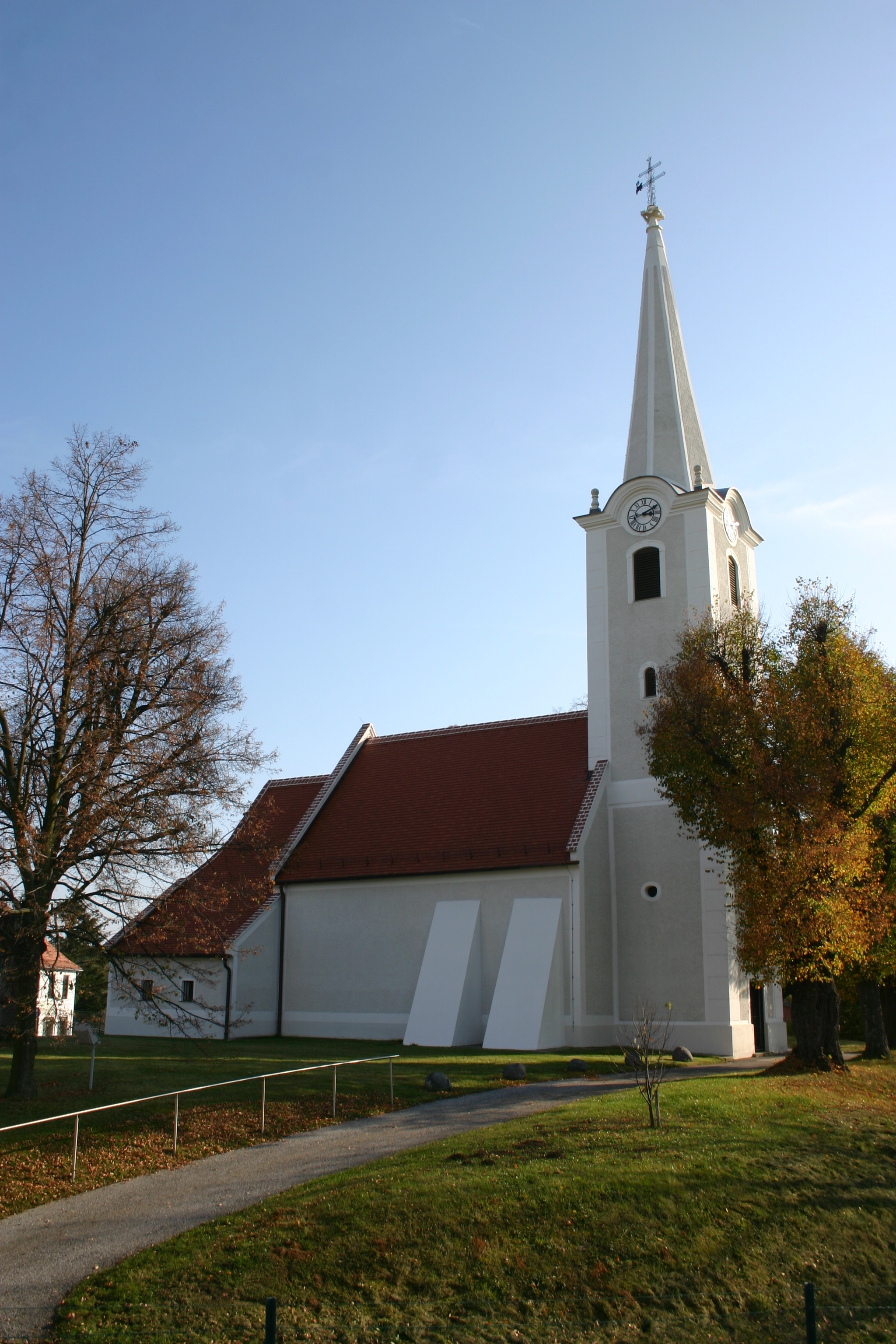
- Holy Trinity Church

- Coat of arms

- Location within Austria
- Coordinates: 47°35′N 16°26′E
- Country: Austria
- State: Burgenland
- District: Oberpullendorf

Government
  - Mayor: Erich Zweiler (SPÖ)

Area
  - Total: 24.74 km^{2} (9.55 sq mi)

Population (2018-01-01)
  - Total: 1,826
  - Density: 73.81/km^{2} (191.2/sq mi)
- Time zone: UTC+1 (CET)
  - Summer (DST): UTC+2 (CEST)
- Postal code: 7331
- Website: www.weppersdorf.at

Weppersdorf (Croatian: Veprštof, Hungarian: Veperd) is a town in the district of Oberpullendorf in the Austrian state of Burgenland.

== Population ==
Historical population
Year	Pop.	±%
1869	1,417	—
1880	1,578	+11.4%
1890	1,604	+1.6%
1900	1,680	+4.7%
1910	1,808	+7.6%
1923	1,861	+2.9%
1934	1,940	+4.2%
1939	1,803	−7.1%
1951	1,843	+2.2%
1961	1,753	−4.9%
1971	1,699	−3.1%
1981	1,735	+2.1%
1991	1,725	−0.6%
2001	1,804	+4.6%
2011	1,837	+1.8%
