= Templar Trail =

Pilgrimage hiking trail from France to Jerusalem

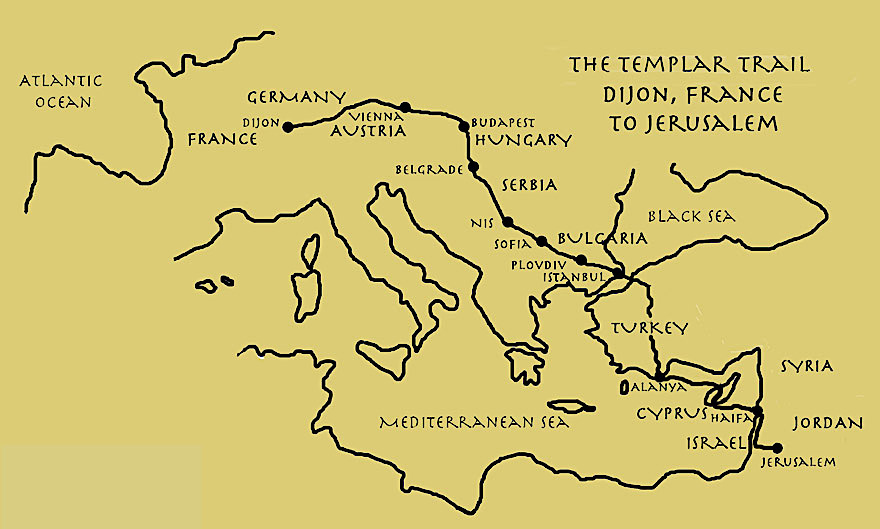
Map of the Templar Trail from France to Jerusalem pioneered by Brandon Wilson on pilgrimage, 2006

The Templar Trail is a pilgrimage path that follows the route used in 1096 by Godfrey of Bouillon, Duke of Lower Lorraine, and his troops during the First Crusade to liberate the city of Jerusalem. It begins in Dijon, France and crosses eleven countries and two continents for 4,223 kilometres (2,624 mi). In 2006, Brandon Wilson, an American author and explorer, and Émile, a retired 68-year-old French teacher, retraced the route to create the trail. The account of their expedition with stages and distances are detailed in Wilson's 2008 book Along the Templar Trail: Seven Million Steps for Peace which won gold in the Lowell Thomas Travel Journalism Awards for best travel book in 2009.

== Historical background ==
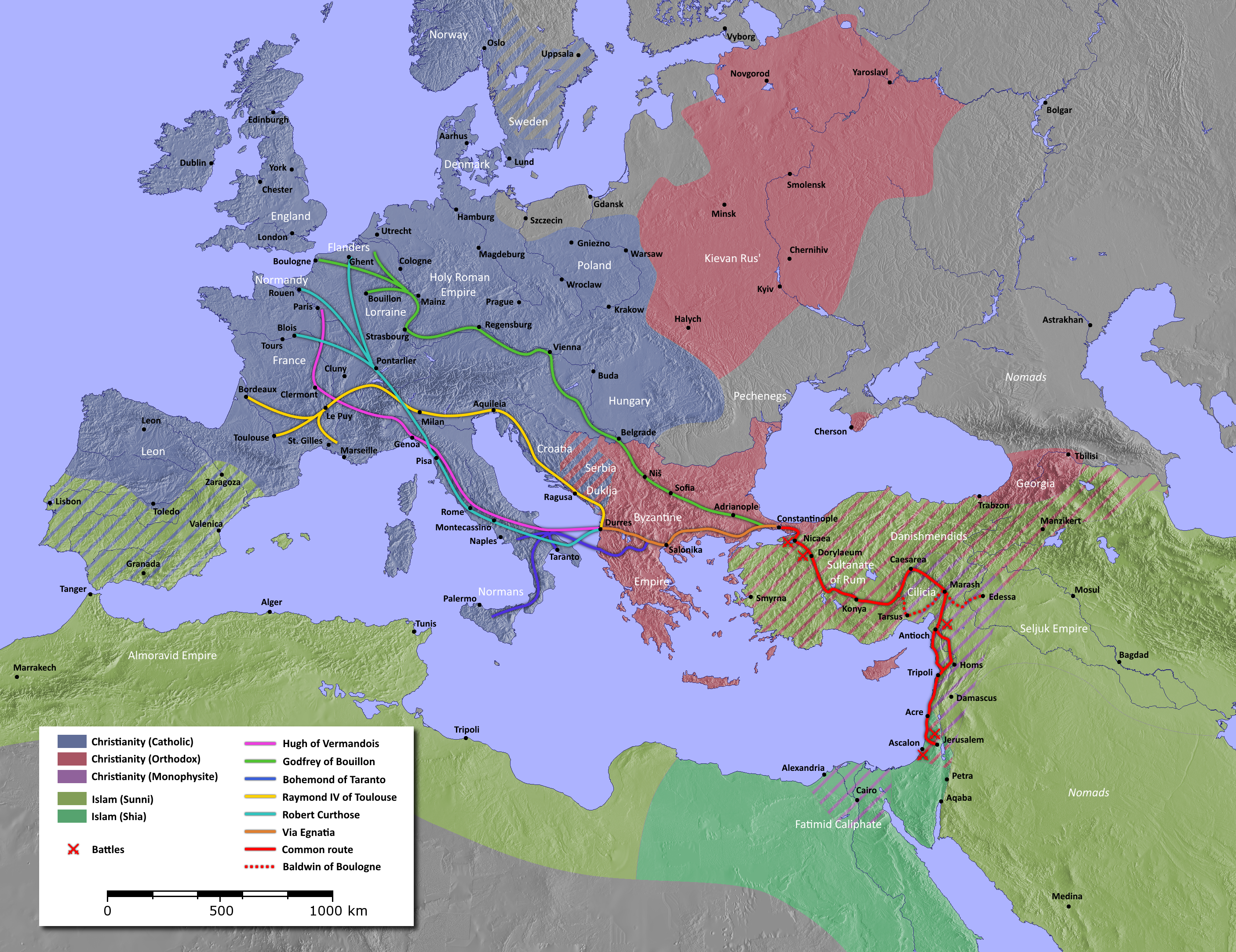
Map of the First Crusade

The Templar Trail pilgrimage route recreates, as much as possible given Middle Eastern conflict, the journey followed during the First Crusade in 1096 by Godfrey of Bouillon, Duke of Lower Lorraine, and his 40,000 troops from France to capture the city of Jerusalem. It stretches across eleven countries and two continents. It took those troops from 1096 to 1099 to finally reach and liberate the city. Jerusalem is a pilgrimage destination in Christianity, Judaism and Islam.

== Journey ==
On April 23, 2006, Brandon Wilson, an American author/explorer, and Émile, a retired 68-year-old French teacher, set off on an expedition to reinstate Godfrey's trail as a modern pilgrimage path and companion route to Spain's popular Camino de Santiago and the Via Francigena. Wilson, who had previously walked four variations of the Camino de Santiago across Spain, the St. Olav's Way across Norway and Sweden twice, and the Via Francigena from Canterbury to Rome, wanted to pioneer and transform this historic way of war into a path of peace for future pilgrims to Jerusalem.

Wilson and Émile followed canal paths from Dijon, France through Switzerland to Donaueschingen in southern Germany, the source of the Danube River. Depending on the availability of lodgings, they averaged 31 kilometres (19 mi) a day. In Bavaria, they connected with the Donau Radweg, or Danube bicycle path, that led them into Austria, then Bratislava, Slovakia and into Hungary.

After reaching Budapest, they headed south still following the Danube River Valley on smaller bicycle paths and roads to Serbia. Upon their arrival in Belgrade on July 12, 2006, the Middle East erupted with the 2006 Hezbollah cross-border raid, which marked the start of the 2006 Lebanon War but they carried on to Istanbul where they would decide if, how, and where to continue. With the outbreak of war in Syria/Israel/Lebanon, walking became more difficult and its success uncertain, but they persevered, due in part to the newspaper and TV coverage they received along the way, which helped spread their mission of peace.

In Istanbul, Émile returned to France due to ill-health, with Wilson continuing alone across the Turkish steppes, making the short passage from Alanya on the southern Turkish coast to northern Cyprus to avoid walking through potential war zones and an Ebola outbreak in eastern Turkey. Then he trekked cross-country to the port at Limassol, a city steeped in the Crusader history of Richard the Lionheart and home to Kolossi Castle, a Knight Templar fortress.

After a short Mediterranean crossing by cargo ship, Wilson connected with the Israel National Trail, a well-marked footpath that led from outside Haifa nearly all the way to Jerusalem. On September 29, 2006, some nine hundred-seven years after Godfrey de Bouillon, Wilson reached the Holy City after 160 days total; with 137 of those walking days. The pilgrimage trail they re-blazed stretched approximately 4,223 kilometres (2,624 mi). Wilson named it the Templar Trail in honor of those first knights who protected early pilgrims to Jerusalem, with the hope that this path of war would now be transformed into one of peace.

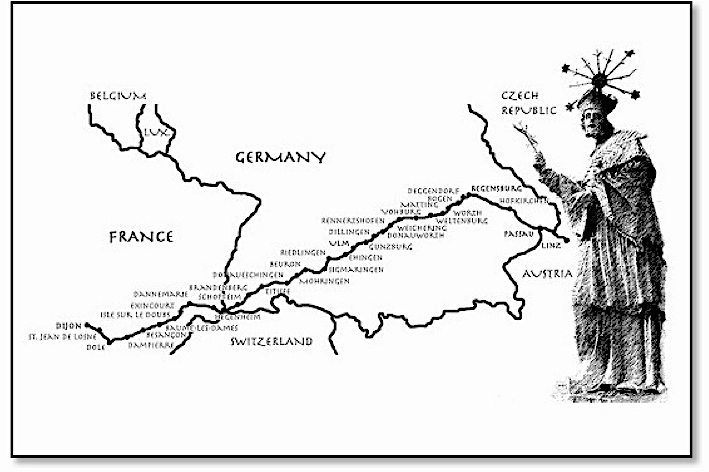
Templar Trail pilgrimage route France to Jerusalem, France-Germany

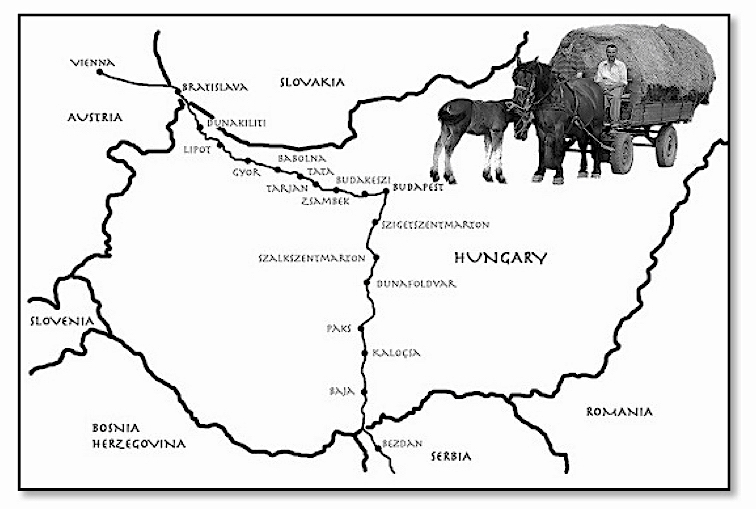
Templar Trail pilgrimage route France to Jerusalem, Hungary

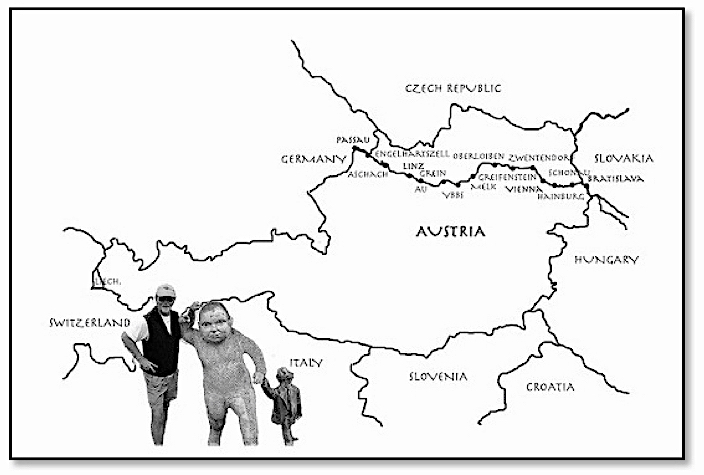
Templar Trail pilgrimage route France to Jerusalem, Austria

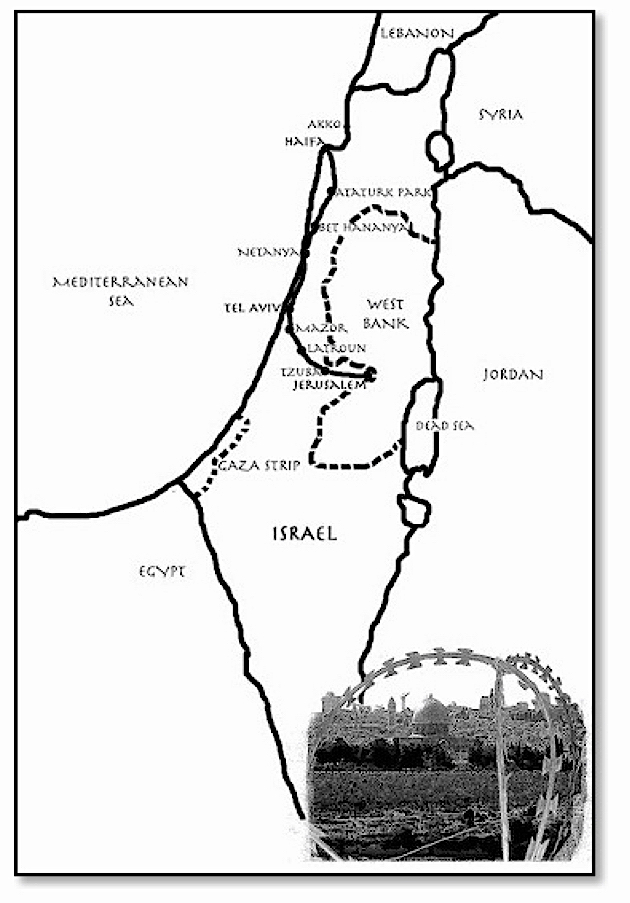
Templar Trail pilgrimage route France to Jerusalem, Israel

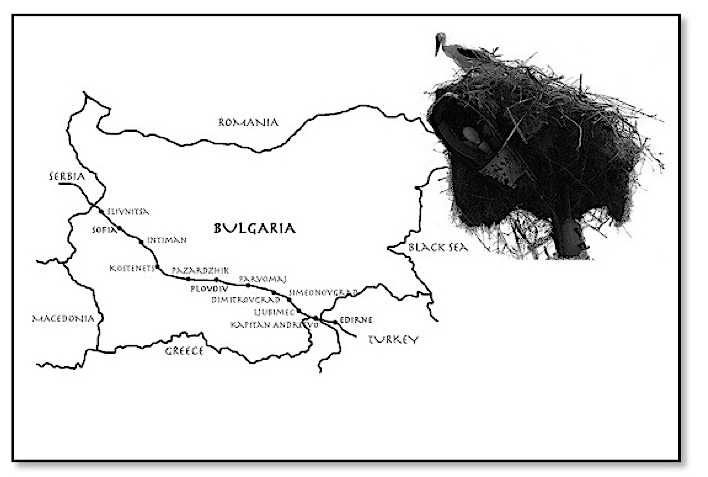
Templar Trail pilgrimage route France to Jerusalem, Bulgaria

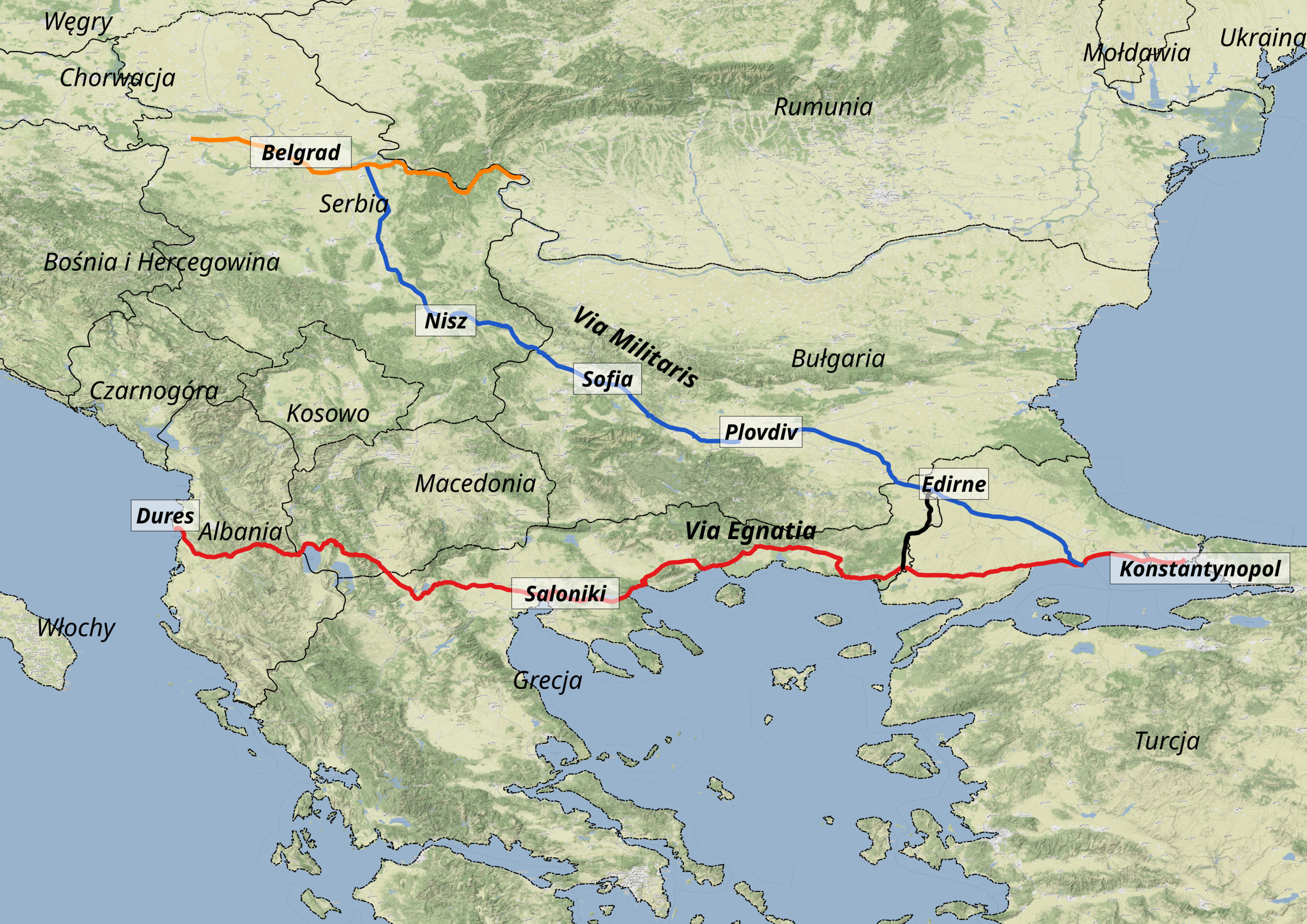
Via Militaris and Via Egnatia

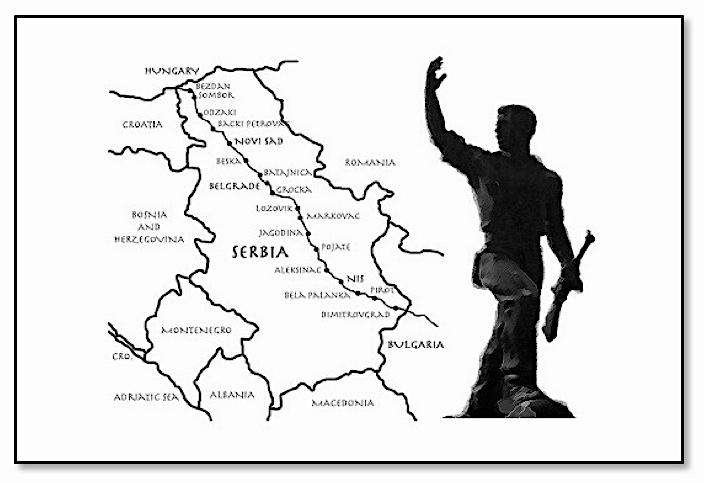
Templar Trail pilgrimage route France to Jerusalem, Serbia

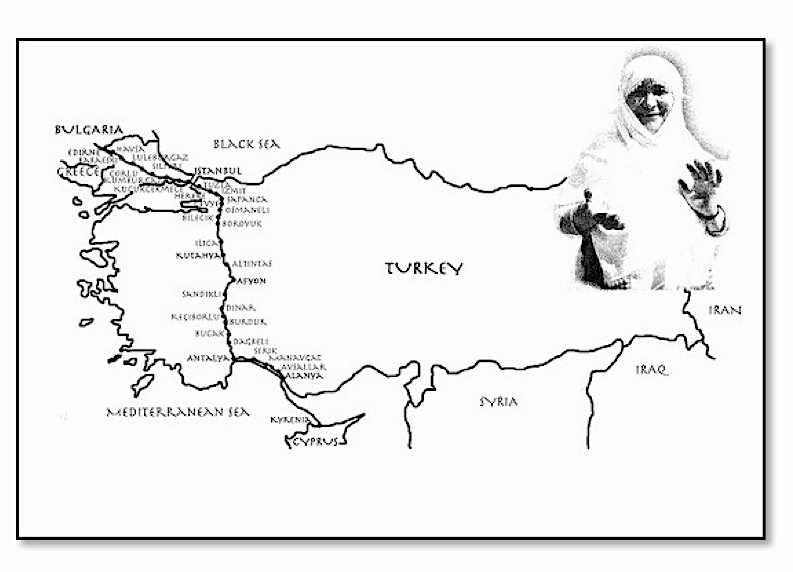
Templar Trail pilgrimage route France to Jerusalem, Turkey

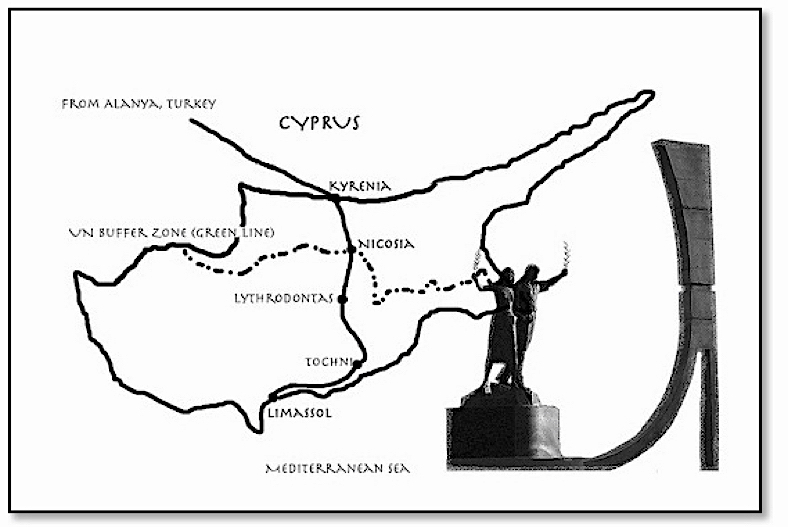
Templar Trail pilgrimage route France to Jerusalem, Cyprus
