= Helena Vaz da Silva =

Portuguese journalist, writer and member of the European Parliament

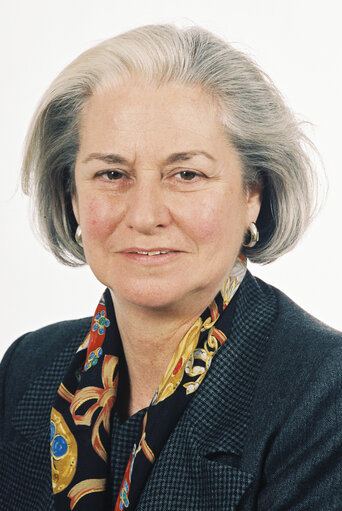
- Born: Helena Maria da Costa de Sousa de Macedo Gentil; July 3, 1939; Lisbon, Portugal
- Died: August 12, 2002 (aged 63); Lisbon, Portugal
- Occupations: Writer, journalist, magazine editor, translator
- Spouse: Alberto de Mira Mendes Vaz da Silva
- Children: 4
- Awards: Grand Officer of the Ordem do Infante Dom Henrique

Helena Vaz da Silva (1939 – 2002) was one of the first and most influential cultural journalists in Portugal. She was a member of the European Parliament between 1994 and 1999.

== Early life ==
Helena Maria da Costa de Sousa de Macedo Gentil was born in the Portuguese capital of Lisbon on 3 July 1939. She was the only daughter of Francisco Mascarenhas Gentil, a lawyer, who died when she was 9, and Isabel Maria da Ascenção Barjona de Freitas da Costa de Sousa de Macedo. Her paternal grandfather, the surgeon and professor of medicine Francisco Gentil, was the founder and director of the Portuguese Institute of Oncology and director of the Faculty of Medicine of the University of Lisbon. Silva attended Catholic schools in Lisbon. At the age of 17 she began her professional life at an advertising agency, carrying out functions similar to those of the poet and writer Fernando Pessoa who had worked earlier for the same company. In 1959, she married Alberto de Mira Mendes Vaz da Silva at the Jerónimos Monastery in Belém, near Lisbon. They had four children.

== Journalistic activities ==
Vaz da Silva and her husband became part of an influential cultural circle in Lisbon that was part of the progressive Catholic movement. In 1963 she was one of the founders of a new magazine, called O Tempo e O Modo, which opposed the prevailing Estado Novo regime, aiming to open up new political, cultural, literary and artistic horizons in Portugal. Contributors included Mário Soares, who subsequently served as both prime minister and president of the country; the politician and lawyer, Salgado Zenha; another lawyer and future president, Jorge Sampaio, the poet and writer Sophia de Mello Breyner Andresen; the poet, writer and critic, Jorge de Sena; and the writer, Agustina Bessa-Luís. In 1965, she assumed responsibility for the Portuguese edition of Concilium a journal of Roman Catholic theology.

Later, Vaz da Silva returned to studying journalism and sociology at the University of Vincennes in Paris, where she witnessed the workers' and students' protests of May 68. After her return to Lisbon she briefly worked for a tourism company in the Algarve before joining the Expresso newspaper and also directing political and social programs of the national broadcaster, RTP. In 1977 she joined ANOP (Agência Noticiosa Portuguesa) to head its work on culture. In 1978, she became editor and owner of the magazine Raiz e Utopia. Her published work includes a lengthy interview with the Portuguese artist, Júlio Pomar.

== National Culture Centre ==
In 1979, Vaz da Silva became president of the Centro Nacional de Cultura (National Culture Centre - CNC), a position she occupied until her death. There she initiated activities to promote the dissemination, study and preservation of the Portuguese language and culture. She launched "Sunday tours", which were cultural itineraries to help people learn both about the country's heritage and contemporary artistic work. In 1980 she became vice-president of the Instituto Português de Cinema (Portuguese Cinema Institute – IPC), through which she met Marguerite Yourcenar, the first woman elected to the Académie française. They became friends and Vaz da Silva translated some of Yourcenar's works. From 1989 to 1994 she was president of the Portuguese National Commission of UNESCO.

== European Parliament ==
In 1994 she was elected as a member of the European Parliament as a representative of the centre-right Social Democratic Party (PSD) as an independent. In 1996 she was a member of the Commission for the Future of Television in Portugal and in 2002 she took office as Chairman of the Working Group on Public Television Service. However, soon after that appointment, on 12 August 2002, she died from cancer.

== Awards and honours ==
- Vaz da Silva was awarded the Ordre national du Mérite of France in 1982.
- She was made a Grand Officer of the Ordem do Infante Dom Henrique (Order of Prince Henry) in 2000.
- Streets are named after her in Mem Martins in Sintra, in Charneca de Caparica, and in Lisbon. There are also two squares bearing her name, in Amadora and Valongo.
- A Photographic Biography of Helena Vaz da Silva was published in 2003.

== Helena Vaz da Silva Prize ==
Awarded for the first time in 2013, the Helena Vaz da Silva European Award for Raising Public Awareness on Cultural Heritage is an award instituted by Europa Nostra, the CNC and the Portuguese Press Club. It aims to recognize the fundamental role played by media professionals in disseminating, defending, and promoting Europe's cultural heritage. Recipients have include:

- Italian writer Claudio Magris - 2013
- Turkish writer and Nobel Prize Winner Orhan Pamuk - 2014
- Musician and Spanish conductor Jordi Savall - 2015
- French editorial cartoonist Jean Plantureux, and Portuguese philosopher Eduardo Lourenço - 2016
- German filmmaker Wim Wenders - 2017
- British historian and broadcaster Bettany Hughes - 2018
- Italian physicist Fabiola Gianotti - 2019
- Portuguese poet and librarian of the Vatican Library José Tolentino Mendonça - 2020
- Belgian contemporary dance choreographer Anne Teresa De Keersmaeker - 2021
- Ukrainian conductor Oksana Lyniv - 2022
- Baritone Jorge Chaminé - 2023
- German photographer Thomas Struth - 2024
- Portuguese classical pianist Maria João Pires - 2025
- British-Turkish novelist Elif Shafak - 2026
