= Nagymartoni family =

House of Nagymartoni
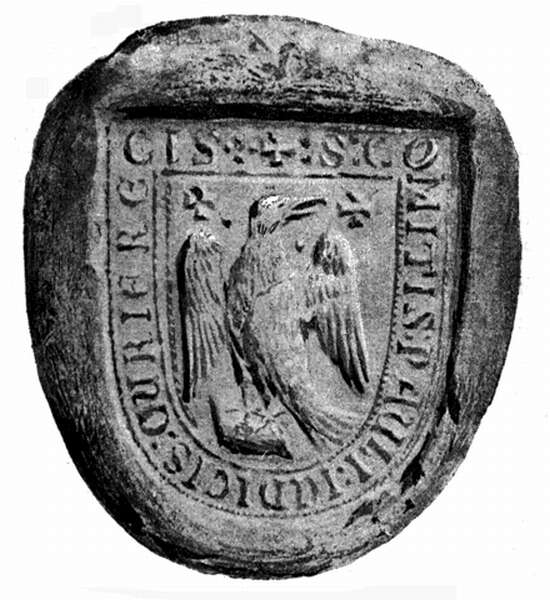
- Country: Kingdom of Aragon; Kingdom of Hungary; Duchy of Austria
- Founded: 1202
- Founder: Tota
- Final ruler: William
- Estates: Nagymarton, Bajót, Fraknó, Kabold, Lánzsér, Trausdorf
- Dissolution: 1446
- Cadet branches: after 1346: "German" and "Hungarian" branches

The Nagymartoni or Martinsdorfi (also Bajtói, and later Fraknói; German: von Mattersdorf, later von Forchtenstein) was a noble family in the Kingdom of Hungary of Aragonese origin, which existed from the early 13th century to the mid-15th century. In the last period of their existence, they were subjects of the Duke of Austria too.

== History ==
=== Arrival in Hungary ===
The kindred of Simon and his brother Michael is called by the name of Martinsdorf. They came from Hispania in the time of King Andrew, son of Béla III. This kindred has many castles in Hispania, of which one, which is the finest, is called Boiot. The grandfather of this Simon fought for many years against the king of Aragon, until at last he was captured by the king and put in prison. This made Count Simon and Bertram afraid, and they came to Hungary with the said King Andrew's second wife [Yolanda of Courtenay], who was from Champagne [sic!]. There is in Hispania no kindred which dares to carry an eagle in its coat of arms except that of Simon and Michael; and the reason is that this kindred is said to have driven out the army of the sultan of Tunis [Abu Zakariya Yahya] when he had attacked with ships the islands of Majorca and Minorca and had defeated the fleet while the other warriors of the king of Aragon were unable to withstand him. It was therefore decreed by the king and the council of the knights that the coat of arms of the kindred which hitherto had only been red without any figure should be changed to show an eagle.

— Illuminated Chronicle

The kindred of Count Simon and his brother Count Michael, surnamed Martinsdorf, came to Hungary in the days of King Emeric, the son of Béla III. They entered in grand style, bringing with them King Emeric's bride Constance, the daughter of the King of Aragon, as well as distinguished knights and a most splendid retinue. The story goes that for certain just reasons their kindred had long been at odds with a particular great count, and that finally they gathered an army and took to the field against him. The count was taken prisoner and strangled on the orders of Simon, the father of Count Simon and Count Michael, and Bertram, their father's brother. The ensuing enmity was what first brought Simon and Bertram to Pannonia [Hungary] with the aforesaid queen. Having had proof of their noble qualities, King Emeric received them with open arms and is recorded to have granted them extensive fiefs in various parts of Hungary. This kindred possesses a number of castles in the kingdom of Spain, one of which, their chief seat, is named Boiot, and it was after this place that the counts and their descendants named their first settlement near Nyergesújfalu "Bajót". [...] In addition, Queen Constance brought with her a girl called Tota, the sister of Count Simon and Count Bertram. She was exceedingly beautiful, so fair, indeed, that scarcely any woman in the world in those days was considered her like. This girl was given in marriage to Duke Benedict, son of Conrad, and her dowry was the town of Martinsdorf, a gift from King Emeric and Queen Constance.

— Simon of Kéza: The Deeds of the Hungarians

The origin of the family was preserved by two chronicles, the 14th-century Illuminated Chronicle, which utilized the text of magister Ákos' now-lost gesta, and Simon of Kéza's Gesta Hunnorum et Hungarorum. Both Ákos (early 1270s) and Simon (early 1280s) were contemporaries of the Nagymartonis' second generation – ispáns Simon and Michael, as a result both of them called the family as "the kinship of Simon and Michael". The circumstances and time of their arrival are narrated differently by the two chroniclers. While Ákos claims the kinship came to Hungary belonging to the accompaniment of Queen Yolanda of Courtenay, who became the second wife of King Andrew II of Hungary in 1215, Simon of Kéza narrates that the family escorted Constance of Aragon, the wife of King Emeric to Hungary at the turn of the 12th and 13th centuries. While both authors mention the Nagymartonis' castles in the Iberian Peninsula ("Boiot"), their clashes against the "sultan of Tunis" (plausibly Abu Zakariya Yahya) in Mallorca and Menorca and the coat-of-arms donation derived therefrom, but, the two authors disagree as to why they left Aragon; according to Ákos, the unidentified father of Simon I and Bertrand (or Bertram) rebelled against King James I of Aragon, which resulted his imprisonment. His young sons decided to flee the kingdom and seek refuge in Hungary. In contrast, Simon of Kéza writes the brothers embroiled into a conflict with an unidentified count and though they defeated him, the resulting hostility forced them to settle in Hungary. In addition, Simon of Kéza does not omit to mention Tota, the sister of Simon and Bertrand, who was lady-in-waiting of Queen Constance and married a powerful lord Benedict, son of Korlát, which laid the foundations for the social rise of the Nagymartoni family in Hungary.

Coat-of-arms of Bajót, derived from the shield of Nagymartonis

Historian Antal Pór accepted the narration of Simon of Kéza regarding Tota whose marriage with Benedict and her dowry – Nagymarton (or Mattersdorf, present-day Mattersburg, Austria) and Bajót – can be proved in the sources. Pór, however, ruled out that Simon and Bertrand had also came to Hungary during the reign of King Emeric. The 1202 donation letter to Tota narrates that she left behind her parents, siblings and relatives, when escorted Constance to Hungary. A charter of Andrew II from 1223 refers to that Simon previously came to visit her sister to Hungary, when he wheedled himself into Andrew's confidence to such an extent that the monarch encouraged him to settle in the kingdom. According to historian György Szabados, Tota was much more younger than her brothers. Upon Constance's request, King Emeric, attaching it to her dowry, donated all royal revenues of Nagymarton to Tota, exempting the landholding from taxation in 1202. According to a royal charter of Andrew II from 1221, Benedict was exiled and confiscated all of his estates prior to that (it is possible he participated in the 1209–10 conspiracy against the monarch). Despite that, his wife Tota remained in Hungary and continued to belong to the royal household. She faithfully served Yolanda of Courtenay, the second wife of Andrew II since 1215. In the aforementioned charter (1221), Andrew II returned Benedict's confiscated lands – Nagymarton and Bajót – to Tota in recognition of her services. Her wealth was inherited by her brother Simon, who, however, was forced to prove the legitimacy of his ownership right during a lawsuit in 1230. Historian Attila Zsoldos also argued Simon and Bertrand arrived to Hungary only during the reign of Andrew II. Simon is first referred to as a member of the entourage of Duke Béla in 1220. Antal Pór assumed the younger brother Bertrand settled in Hungary even later. Zsoldos considered if anyone from the family, only Bertrand participated in the conquest of Majorca (1228–1231), but he settled down in Hungary too before 1241. Bertrand mediated the prenuptial agreement between James I of Aragon and Violant of Hungary in February 1233, alongside Pope Gregory IX and Bartholomew le Gros, the Bishop of Pécs.

=== Rise ===
They [the Mongols] could not take the citadel of the city [Esztergom], because the Spaniard Simon [Symeon Hispanus] manfully defended it with his many crossbowmen.

— Master Roger's Epistle to the Sorrowful Lament upon the Destruction of the Kingdom of Hungary by the Tatars

Simon (I) was considered one of the faithful confidants of King Andrew II since the 1220s. He served as ispán of Bars County in 1221. For his service, Simon was granted the land Röjtökör in Sopron County (Rahtukeuri, present-day Neudörfl, Austria) in 1223. His sister Tota died childless sometime between 1221 and 1230. Her wealth – Bajót and Nagymarton – was inherited by Simon. His family derived its surname – Nagymartoni and, less frequently, Bajóti – from these two villages until the first half of the 14th century. Sometime around the late 1220s, Simon was also granted the land Csenke in Esztergom County (laid near present-day Mužla, Slovakia) by Andrew II. He also bought Besenyő (present-day Pöttsching, Austria). By the 1230s, Simon belonged to the king's innermost circle. He served as ispán of Győr County from 1232 to 1234 (or 1235). Simon performed diplomatic mission to the Holy See in 1232, when the king complained against the interdict of Hungary. imon was also among those barons, who swore to the oath of Bereg in September 1233.

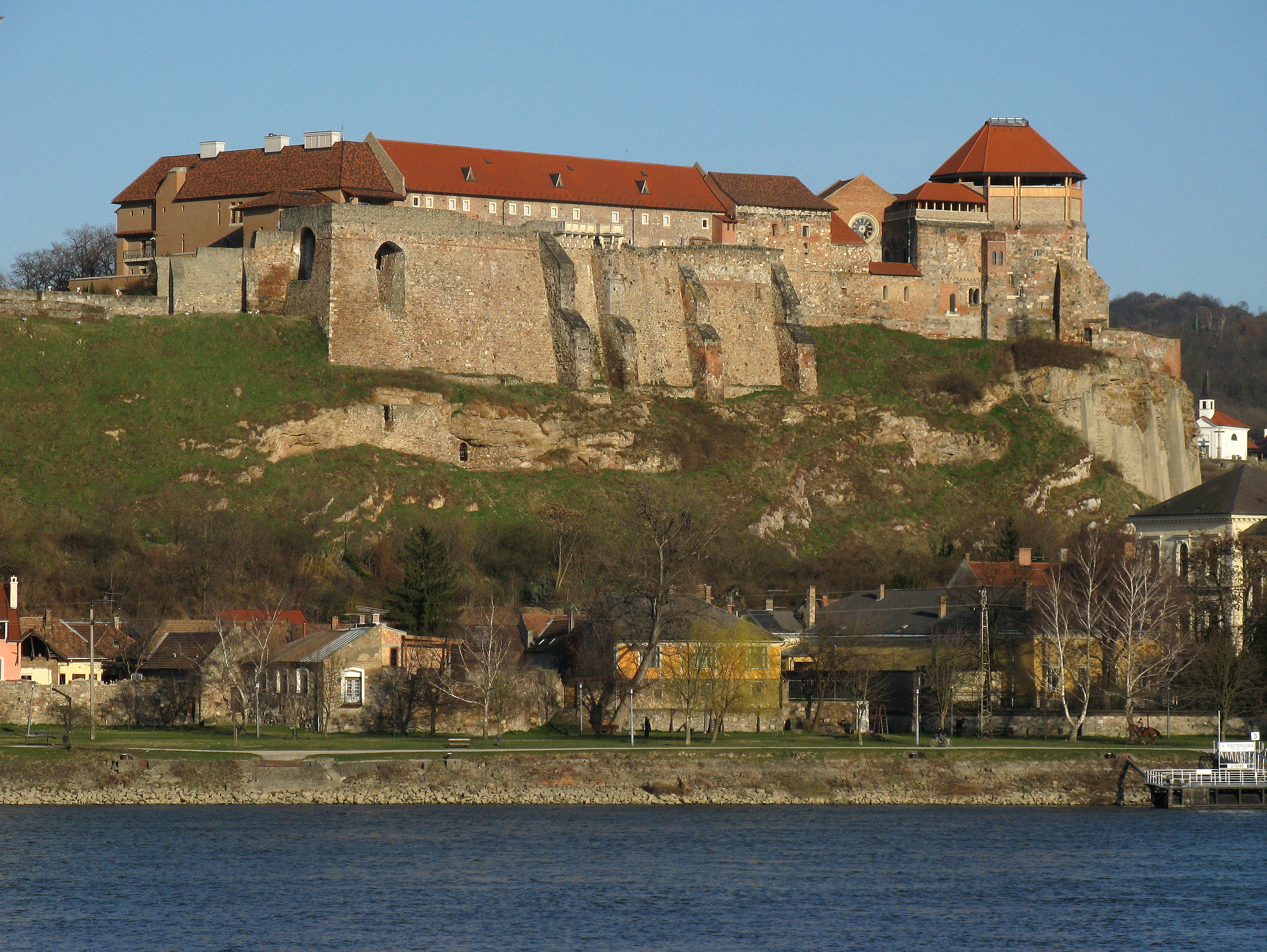
The stone walls of Esztergom Castle, defended by Simon (I) during the first Mongol invasion of Hungary

When Béla IV ascended the Hungarian throne in 1235, Simon – unlike many barons – avoided imprisonment or fall out of favor. When the Mongols invaded Hungary in the spring of 1241, Simon and Bertrand (it is possible he arrived to Hungary not long before) participated in the disastrous Battle of Mohi on 11 April 1241. Subsequently, Simon was among those barons of noblemen, who organized the armed resistance against the Mongols in 1241–1242. He successfully defended the citadel of Esztergom against the invaders in January 1242. Following the siege of Esztergom, Simon and Bertrand have completed diplomatic missions several times throughout the year 1242 on behalf of Béla IV in order to seek military assistance and financial aid against the Mongols. The brothers were granted several lands from the king simultaneously, Gadundorf, Zolonta (present-day a borough of Okoč, Slovakia), Pucyn and Kesző. Béla also entrusted the brothers to populate, cultivate and develop these lands, whose population has fled or died during the Mongol invasion. In addition to landholdings, Bertrand was made ispán of Szolgagyőr (Galgóc) royal castle (ispánate) within Nyitra County in 1243 (present-day ruins in Hlohovec, Slovakia). Bertrand participated in the Battle of the Leitha River on 15 June 1246, where he was captured and imprisoned. He was released after a while. He was granted three villages called "Család", present-day Csapod, Hövej and Pusztacsalád. Around November 1250, Béla IV sent Simon to the Holy See in order to deliver his famous "Tartar letter" to Pope Innocent IV. The Hungarian monarch sought assistance from the pope against a planned new Mongol invasion.

Simon had two sons, Simon (II) and Michael, who first appeared in contemporary documents in the 1270s. The Nagymartoni family, which flourished until 1446, descended from the two sons of Simon. Bertrand married a French noblewoman Ahalyz (or Elizabeth), who was a former lady-in-waiting for Queen Yolanda, the second spouse of King Andrew II. Bertrand became her third husband; formerly she was a widow of Hungarian lords Batiz Negol then Solomon Atyusz. Their marriage produced an unidentified daughter, who married Osl (III) from the gens (clan) Osl. They were progenitors of the Ostfi (Ostffy) de Asszonyfalva noble family and Osl inherited Csapod and Pusztacsalád. After Ahalyz's death, Bertrand married for a second time. His widow was still alive in 1302.

=== Heyday ===
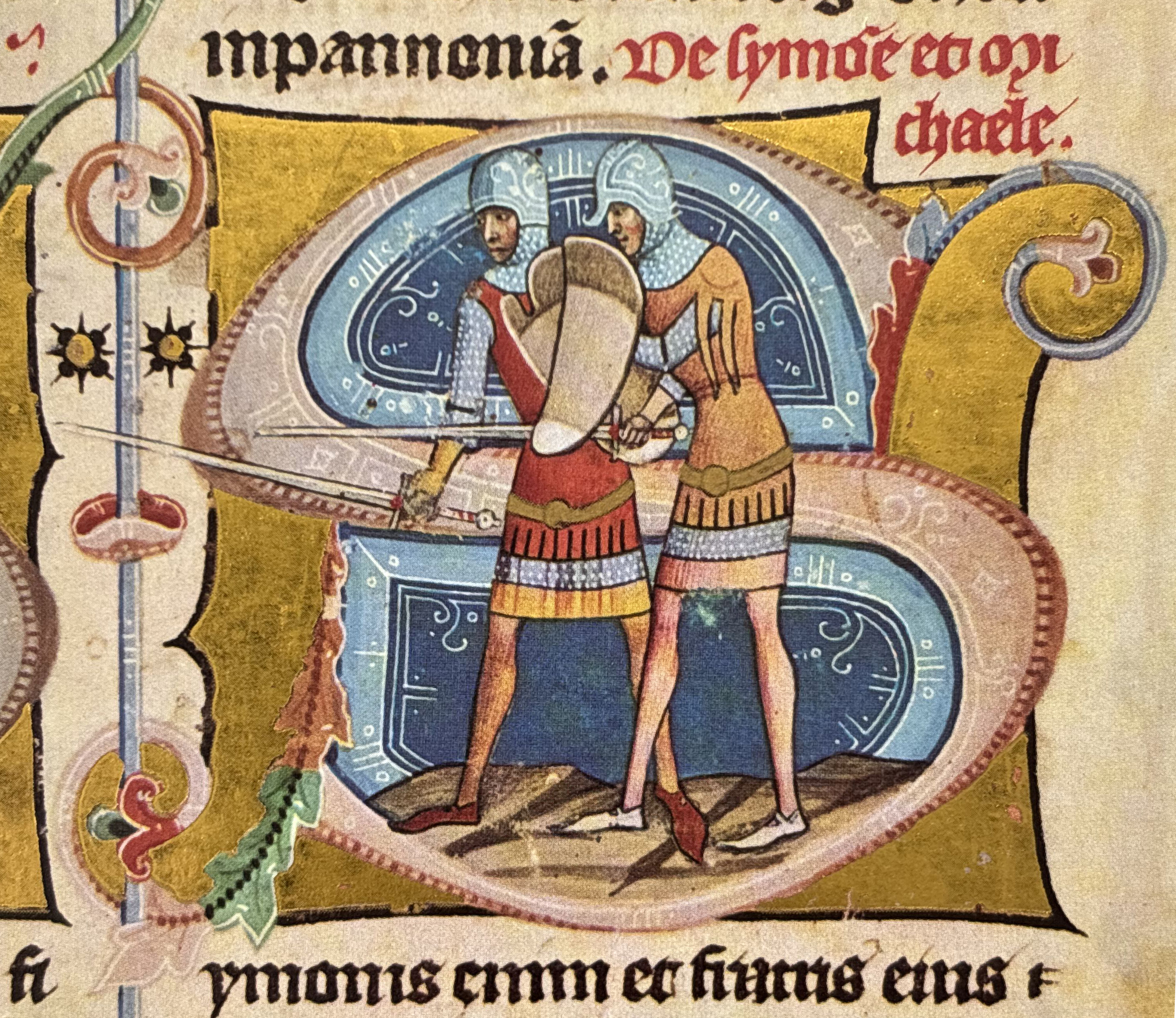
Simon (II) and Michael Nagymartoni, depicted in the 14th-century Illuminated Chronicle

Since the 1270s, Simon (II) and Michael acquired several lands in Western Transdanubia along the border with the Duchy of Austria. They bought Kövesd for 300 silver marks, Bogyoszló (present-day Deutschkreutz, Austria), Gorbolnok, seven portions in Zillingtal (present-day Austria), Péternémeti (present-day a borough of Kobersdorf in Austria), Sikrems and Ikka, all in Sopron County along the river Leitha. Simon and Michael built fortified stone castles in their ancient estates Nagymarton in Sopron County and Bajót in Esztergom County sometime in the 1270–1280s. Simon served as ispán of Bars County from 1277 to 1278. Since the 1280s, along with other noble families in the region, Simon and Michael were forced to enter the service of the powerful Kőszegi family, which gradually extended their influence over Western Transdanubia, including Sopron County. When Albert I, Duke of Austria launched a massive military campaign ("Güssing Feud"; German: Güssinger Fehde) against the Kőszegis and their allies, the Austrian besieged and captured Nagymarton in May 1289.

Andrew III, with the support of the Kőszegis, ascended the Hungarian throne in 1290, he promised to recover the occupied castles and lands from Austria. In 1291, Andrew III invaded Austria, forcing Albert to withdraw his garrisons from the towns and fortresses, including Nagymarton, that he had captured two years before. Both Simon and Michael participated in the campaign. The Peace of Hainburg, which concluded the war, was signed on 26 August 1291. The peace treaty prescribed the destruction of the fortresses that Albert of Austria had seized from the Kőszegis and his allies. Simon put up with it and handed the fort of Nagymarton over to the king's officials. By 1294, the castle was demolished. To compensate for the loss of Nagymarton, Simon bought the castle of Kabold (present-day Kobersdorf, Austria) in early 14th century from the Austrian owner, who acquired the fort after the "Güssing Feud" (although, the original proprietors Stephen II then Peter III Csák laid claim).

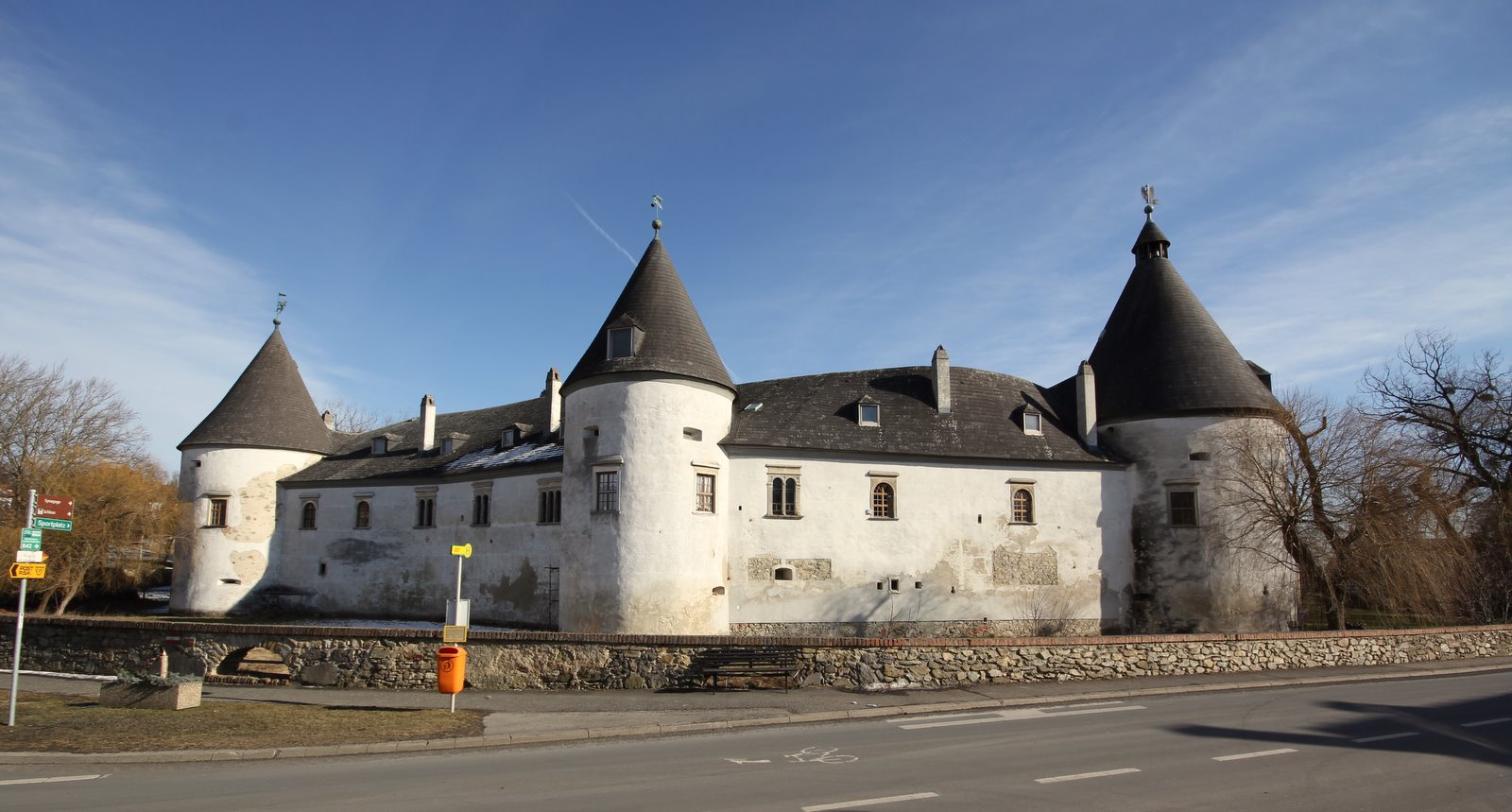
The castle of Kobersdorf (Kabold), owned by the Nagymartonis from the early 14th century to 1441

From his marriage with an unidentified noble lady, Simon (II) had three children. The eldest one Paul (I) rose to the highest of the family members, when he served as Judge royal for two decades, from 1328 to 1349. Lawrence functioned as ispán of Zaránd County between 1332 and 1338, the "German branch" of the Nagymartonis (later Fraknóis) descended from him. Simon's only daughter Clara married the military leader Alexander Köcski, Paul's predecessor in the position of Judge royal.

Michael and his wife, an unidentified Austrian noblewoman, had five sons and a daughter. Unlike their cousins, his sons did not run into a bright career, probably due to their relatively early death. John (I) is mentioned only once in 1307, when – together with his cousin Paul (I) – bought Péli (today a borough of Bajót) from the sons of a certain Halifa. Bartholomew (I) – together with Paul (I) – bought a portion along with half of a tower in Schattendorf in 1312. His familiares lived in the estates Tord and Keych near Lake Neusiedl (Fertő) in 1318. Andrew (or Endurl) was a royal squire. Together with his cousins (Paul and Lawrence) and brother Nicholas (I), he was granted the duty of Kövesd and the estate Pomogy in Sopron County (present-day Pamhagen, Austria) in 1320 by Charles I of Hungary. Four years later, in 1324, Paul (I), Lawrence, Nicholas (I) and Denis were granted the land Alramus along the river Leitha for his services in Charles' unification war. Among the sons of Michael, only Nicholas I (or Nykul) had a descendant, Nicholas (III) "the Hungarian" from his wife Margaret, daughter of Otto von Cheyawe. By the time of the marriage, only Denis had given a guarantee for her dowry. It is plausible his brothers deceased by then. Michael also had a daughter Margaret, who married John (I) Szabari from the gens (clan) Hahót. The Szabari family became extinct in the 1370s.

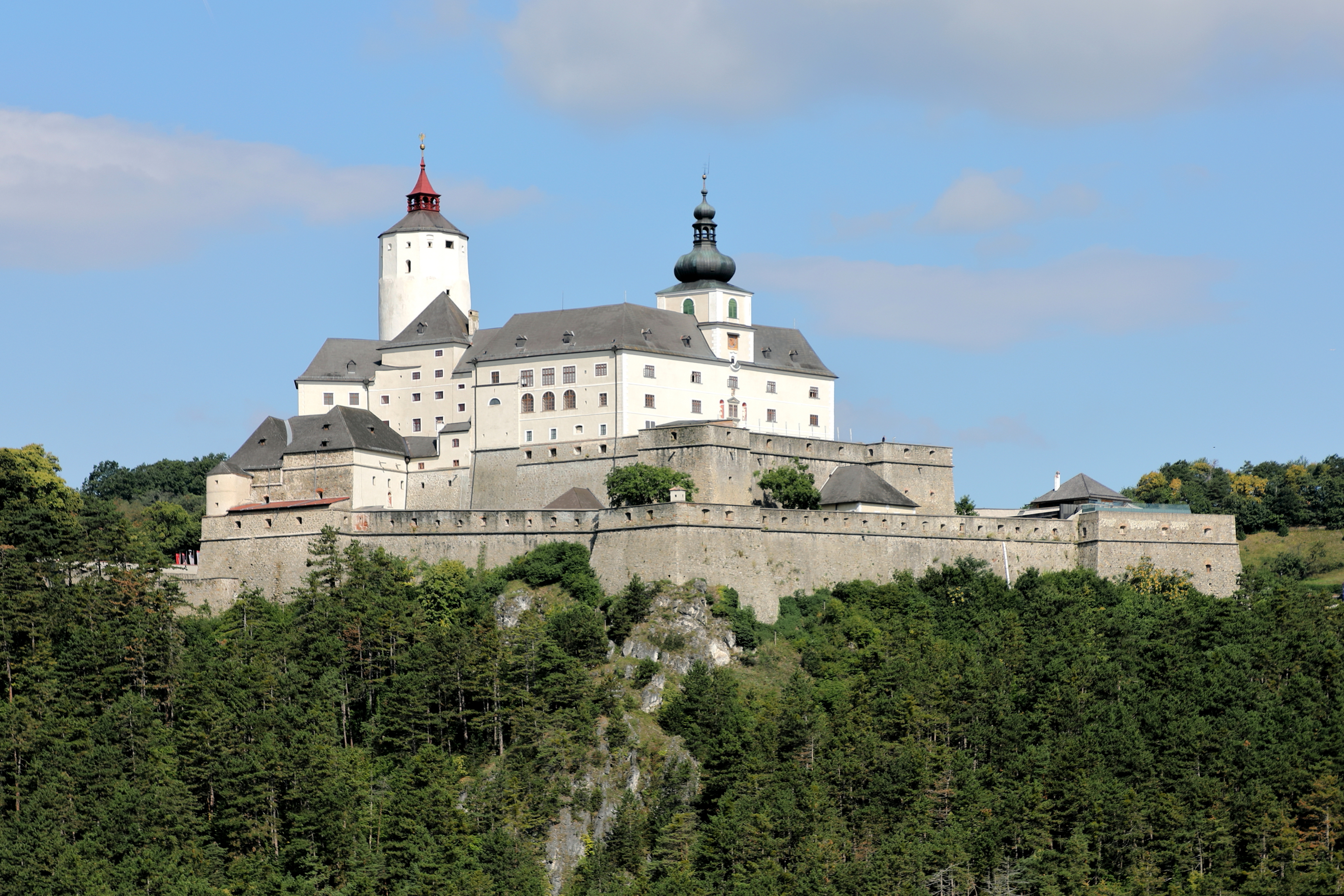
The Nagymartonis built the first Forchtenstein Castle (Fraknó) in the 1320s

By the early 14th century, the Nagymartonis' lands were constantly threatened by two neighboring powerful oligarchic powers, Matthew Csák and the Kőszegi family. Initially, Paul (I) and Lawrence – possibly along with their aforementioned cousins – were forced to join the Kőszegis' familia. When Charles I launched a campaign against the Kőszegis in Transdanubia and Slavonia in the first half of 1316, the Nagymartonis took an oath of allegiance to the king. As a result, the Kőszegis pillaged and looted their lands, while Andrew Kőszegi besieged and seized the castle of Kabold. When Andrew Kőszegi attacked the towns of Sopron and Győr, which refused to acknowledge his supremacy, in the winter of 1317, the burghers successfully repelled the offense with the assistance of the troops of Paul and Lawrence. However, around the same time, Peter III Csák pillaged and destroyed their castle of Bajót in Esztergom County, which was never rebuilt. In his 2024 study, historian Attila Zsoldos considered, however, the castle was destroyed sometime around 1307 or 1308 by Stephen II Csák and his sons, when their lord Charles I expelled Ivan Kőszegi and his partisans from the middle of the realm. For their loyalty and bravery, Paul and Lawrence regained the castle of Kabold by Charles in 1319, who seized the fort from the Kőszegis in his military campaign, while the Csáks abandoned their claims over the fortress as a compensation for the loss of Bajót. Around the same time, the brothers built the first known castle of Forchtenstein (Hungarian: Fraknó). The fortress became the family's new household, which, therefore adopted the Fraknói surname by the mid-14th century.

The family reached its peak with the career of Paul (I), who served as Judge royal from 1328 to 1349. He acquired rich, fertile and extensive lands during his two decades of tenure. He married twice; his first wife was Elizabeth von Pottendorf (fl. 1325). After her death, Nagymartoni married Elizabeth Puchaim with royal permission in 1343. Her father was Austrian noble Henry Puchaim, whose other daughter Agnes was the wife of powerful lord Stephen Lackfi. Paul had a daughter Anne, who married her relative Albert Puchaim. His brother Lawrence, who died sometime between 1340 and 1342, and his wife Margaret, a daughter of Austrian lord Wulfing I Haschendorfer, became ancestors of the so-called "German branch" of the Nagymartoni (Fraknói) family. Louis I of Hungary dismissed Paul from the position of Judge royal in 1349. A royal charter notes that Paul was replaced "after numerous complaints". He lost all political influence and retired from the royal court.

=== Decline ===
In July 1346, the two existing branches of the Nagymartoni family entered into an agreement of land division with each other. Regarding his possessions acquired by himself, Paul (I) excluded the family of his late uncle Michael from the inheritance and made his nephew Nicholas (II) "the German" (son of the deceased Lawrence) his only heir – Bartholomew (II) died sometime after March 1346. Michael's grandson, Nicholas (III) "the Hungarian" was granted half portions of the ancient family estates – e.g. Nagymarton, Fraknó, Bajót, Röjtökör and Kabold –, which proved to be a generous deed from Paul, whereas in previous decades their modernization and strengthening was due only to him and Lawrence. Despite the contract, Nicholas the German and Nicholas the Hungarian (they were second cousins of each other) made another agreement after Paul's death in June 1351: thereafter, they jointly possessed the inherited and acquired landholdings, and if one of them dies without an heir, the other remaining branch shall inherit the estates.

The Nagymartoni (or Fraknói) family gradually Germanised due to the marriages of their family members with noblewomen from the Duchy of Austria. Nicholas the German issued several German-language charters during his lifetime. He styled himself as "Graf Niclas von Merteinsdorf, der Teutsch" in these documents. The family's wealth began to wane under the two Nicholas. As none of them held royal office, the sizeable stock of landholdings proved insufficient to cover the elite way of life. Both of them attended a delegation to Passau at their own expense in 1350, when the envoys escorted Margaret of Bavaria, the spouse of Stephen of Anjou into Hungary. They took on a similar role in 1352, when Maria of Bosnia married Ulrich V, Count of Helfenstein. Nicholas the German also participated in King Louis' campaign into Lithuania in 1351.

These businesses severely indebted the two Nicholas. According to a charter from 1353, Nicholas the German was forced to mortgage his four villages to pay off the loan he had taken from a Jewish called Israel from Sopron in order to cover his expenses at his participation in the aforementioned two legations and the Lithuanian military campaign. Nicholas even scattered the dowry of his sister Catherine, the wife of Emeric II Lackfi. As a result, he had to mortgage the estate Pordány (present-day Wulkaprodersdorf, Austria) and the half of the duty of Kövesd to his brother-in-law. His allies, the Csornais (later Kanizsais) took over part of his huge debt, but in return they pledged his possessions in Esztergom County as collateral. He also mortgaged Ikrény in Győr County and the revenue of Széleskút in Pozsony County (present-day Sološnica, Slovakia) to the Csornais. Nicholas the Hungarian followed the same path: he borrowed 500 pound denari from a Jewish merchant in Vienna in 1363. He took out a loan from brothers Smerlein and Eberlein, two Jewish usurers in Sopron in 1374. There are signs that the Hungarian kings sought to help settle the Nagymartonis' stable financial situation through purchases and privilege donations. Louis I granted the right of hold weekly fairs to their ancient estate Nagymarton. He also bought some of their lands in Esztergom County, since his successor Sigismund donated Nyergesújfalu, Bajót, Csenke and Péli to the Archdiocese of Esztergom in 1388.

The Nagymartonis' property rights have been disputed in a number of lawsuits shortly after the death of Paul (I). In the early years, Louis I sought to protect them in eliminating the violations committed against them. For instance, he forced their relative Kónya Szécsényi (his wife Elizabeth Haschendorfer was the sister of Lawrence's widow) to return the estate Ikrény in Győr County to them. The king seized the estate Egered, which laid in the territory of present-day Sopron, from Thomas Köcski and returned to the property of the Nagymartonis. Both Nicholas was involved in numerous conflicts with their neighbors along the Western border. They often recruited Austrian knights during these fighting. For instance, Nicholas the German pillaged the lands of his relative John Ostfi. This fact only deepened their commitment to Austria, where they began to integrate slowly into the circles of the local frontier nobility. Nicholas the Hungarian and Iban von Bernstein, another lord of Hungarian origin were among the founders of the St. George altar in the parish church of Wiener Neustadt. Furthermore, Nicholas the Hungarian accepted a fiduciary estate in Gnadendorf from Rudolf IV, Duke of Austria in June 1363. Austrian lords Iban von Bernstein and Rudolf von Stadeck visited Fraknó Castle in December 1374. They personally guaranteed the trustworthiness of Nicholas the German, who pledged allegiance to Albert III, Duke of Austria and vowed that he and his family will serve the duke faithfully with all his strength and castle against everyone but the Hungarian monarch Louis I. Nicholas promised neutrality in case of potential war between Austria and Hungary. Nicholas also promised that without the duke's knowledge and consent he will not enter into any agreement with the Hungarian king. Three years later, in 1377, Nicholas the German resided in Vienna, where promised he does not offer to take shelter for those who robbing and tearing Austria. In 1378, Nicholas the German, his son Paul (II) and his second nephew John (II), the son of the late Nicholas the Hungarian, authorized and requested Nicholas' daughter Joanna and son-in-law John Meggyesi from the gens (clan) Pok to redeem and possess all of their mortgaged property and even re-pledge it to others.

=== Last decades ===
According to a document from 1379, the troops of John (II) attacked and robbed the serfs of John Ostfi in Egered and Moróc (present-day Marz, Austria). Paul (II) was appointed an official of the court of Sigismund, Margrave of Brandenburg (the future king of Hungary) in 1385. Sigismund ordered him to recover those estates to John Ostfi, which he and his relative John (II) occupied and usurped from him, and enforce his claims lawfully. Paul (II) married Anne, the daughter of court knight John Bazini. He paid 900 marks of Viennese denari and pledged Schattendorf and Drawstarf (or Trauensdorf, present-day Trausdorf, Austria) as a dower to his wife. Due to his marriage, Paul (II) foreclosed the mortgage and acquired the castle of Lánzsér (present-day Landsee, part of Markt Sankt Martin in Austria) from the Atyinai family in 1386. Paul saved Anthony Agyagosi of the gens Osl from Jewish usurers in Austria, why he pledged a portion from his estate Heflán (present-day Großhöflein, Austria) to Paul.

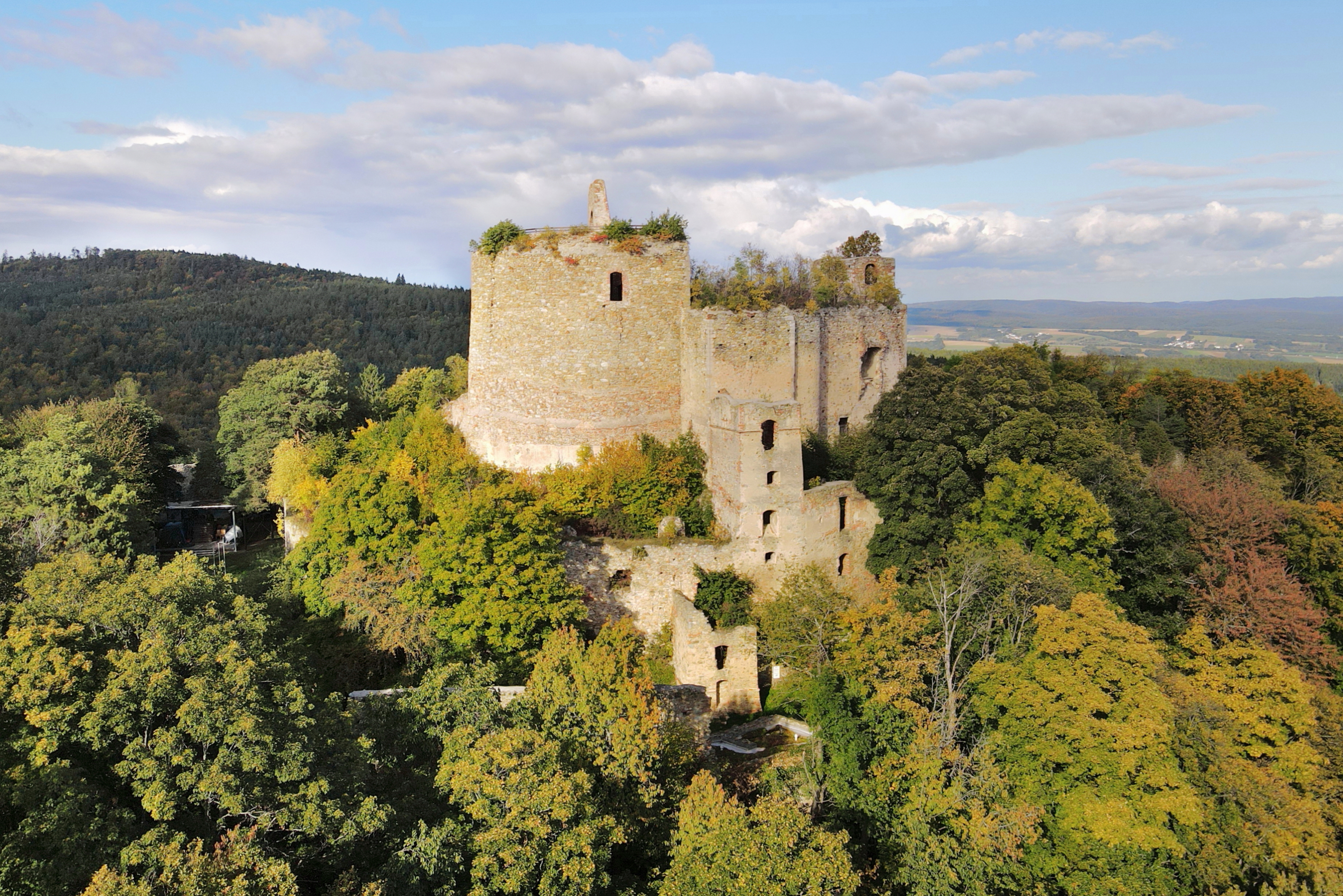
The family possessed Burgruine Landsee (Lánzsér) between 1386 and 1445

Paul (II) died sometime after 1393, which led to the final decline of the Nagymartoni family. His sons Paul (III) and Nicholas (IV) joined a rebellion against the rule of Sigismund, who, therefore, confiscated the castle of Fraknó from them and handed it over to the Kanizsai family in 1398. Within two years, Sigismund pardoned them and returned the fort to the brothers by 1400. John (II) was lying in his bed in a serious illness in 1400, when mortgaged a half of his portion in Fraknó and its accessories and other already pledged estates to "Christians and Jews" for 2000 Viennese denari. Nevertheless, he was still alive in 1412. Paul (III) was referred to as magnate of the realm in 1422. Sigismund forced Paul (III) to hand over the fort of Drawstarf to the Kanizsais in 1430. Despite that, the king confirmed the ownership of Paul (III) and William – the son of John (II) – over the fort in 1435. Paul (III) had an armed conflict over some property with the Archdiocese of Salzburg in the 1430s. Nicholas (IV), who married Catherine Bazini, died childless sometime after 1414. Paul (III) died in 1437, left behind his widow Anne von Pottendorf and their two minor daughters, Margaret and Walpurga. Anne was pregnant at the time of his death.

Because of Paul's death, King Sigismund adjourned the lawsuit between the Nagymartonis and the Ostfis over Heflán in the spring of 1437. Simultaneously, William filed a lawsuit against Anne von Pottendorf in order to acquire the heritage of Paul (III). During the lawsuit, the verdict was that the property was divided between them until the child is born, and further decisions are made at a later date depending on their gender. Paul (IV) was born by the end of 1437. The lawsuit over Heflán continued after his birth; the Ostfis renounced their claim to the settlement in exchange for 800 golden florins in June 1438. The infant Paul (IV) died suddenly in 1439, which led to the extinction of the "German branch". William, as the only surviving male member, claimed for himself the entire Nagymartoni inheritance. Palatine Lawrence Hédervári ruled in favor of William who, however, was unable to assert his legal claim because of the emerging civil war in Hungary (1440–1445). Both William and Anne turned to Albert VI, Duke of Austria for patronage. Anne von Pottendorf mortgaged Fraknó Castle to the duke in 1440, to ensure a livelihood. William who owed 150,000 gold to the duke, also pledged the castles of Kabold and Lánzsér to Albert VI in 1441 and 1445, respectively. Austria was able to retain all castles following the civil war, which have thus been lost to Hungary for centuries. William and his wife Dorothea Cikó de Pomáz donated the village Hövej to the Premonstratensian abbey of Csorna in 1445. William died without descendants in 1446, ending the Nagymartoni–Fraknói bloodline after two and a half centuries.

== Family tree ==
- N
  - Simon I (Bajóti; fl. 1220–1250), ispán of Bars (1221) and Győr (1232–1234) counties
    - Simon II (Nagymartoni; fl. 1272–1304), ispán of Bars County (1277–1278)
      - Paul I (fl. 1307–1351†), Judge royal (1328–1349) ∞ (1) Elizabeth von Pottendorf, (2, m. 1343) Elizabeth Puchaim
        - Anne (fl. 1340–1353) ∞ Albert Puchaim
      - Lawrence (Fraknói; fl. 1319–1340, d. before 1342), ispán of Zaránd County (1332–1338) ∞ (m. 1325) Margaret Haschendorfer
        - Nicholas II ("the German"; fl. 1339–1381) ∞ (1) unidentified, (2) Elizabeth N
          - (1) Paul II (fl. 1373–1393) ∞ Anne Bazini
            - Paul III (fl. 1400–1437†) ∞ Anne von Pottendorf
              - Margaret (fl. 1437–1447)
              - Walpurga (fl. 1437–1447)
              - Paul IV (1437–1439†), posthumous son
            - Nicholas IV (fl. 1400–1414) ∞ Catherine Bazini
          - (1) Joanna (fl. 1378) ∞ John Meggyesi
        - Bartholomew II (fl. 1342–1346†)
        - Catherine (fl. 1362) ∞ Emeric II Lackfi
      - Clara (fl. 1326–1328) ∞ Alexander Köcski
    - Michael (fl. 1277–1304) ∞ Austrian lady
      - John I (fl. 1307)
      - Bartholomew I (fl. 1312–1318)
      - Nicholas I (or Nykul, Fraknói; fl. 1320–1332) ∞ Margaret von Cheyawe
        - Nicholas III ("the Hungarian"; fl. 1346–1374, d. before 1378)
          - John II (or Jensul; fl. 1378–1412)
            - William (fl. 1407–1446†), last male member ∞ Dorothea Cikó de Pomáz
      - Andrew (or Endurl; fl. 1320–1322)
      - Denis (fl. 1324)
      - Margaret (fl. 1353) ∞ John I Szabari
  - Bertrand (or Bertram; fl. 1243–1276), ispán of Szolgagyőr (Galgóc) caste district (1243) ∞ (1) Ahalyz N, (2) unidentified
    - daughter (fl. 1276) ∞ Osl III Osl
  - Tota (fl. 1202–1221, d. before 1230) ∞ (m. 1201 or 1202) Benedict, son of Korlát

== Legacy in popular culture ==
Until the early 19th century, historians assumed the identity of the two names Benedict and Bánk (Banco). Therefore, the person of Benedict, son of Korlát was also identified with Bánk Bár-Kalán, a powerful lord and alleged mastermind behind the assassination of Queen Gertrude of Merania in 1213. As a result, playwright and poet József Katona, who wrote the Hungarian historical tragedy Bánk bán in 1819, called Bánk as "the son of Conrad" and modeled his fictional wife Melinda on the "beautiful" court lady Tota. Katona mistakenly included Simon (II) and Michael as the brothers of "Melinda". In his play, the characters of bans Mikhal and Simon of Boioth were of Spanish origin, who were forced to exile to Hungary after their fights against the Moors, but they are constantly longing for home to Hispania. Both of them are involved in the assassination. In fact, another couple of brothers, Simon and Michael Kacsics were that nobles, who were embroiled in suspicion of their involvement in the murder.

== Sources ==
=== Primary sources ===
- Master Roger's Epistle to the Sorrowful Lament upon the Destruction of the Kingdom of Hungary by the Tatars (Translated and Annotated by János M. Bak and Martyn Rady) (2010). In: Rady, Martyn; Veszprémy, László; Bak, János M. (2010); Anonymus and Master Roger; CEU Press; ISBN 978-9639776951.
- Simon of Kéza: The Deeds of the Hungarians (Edited and translated by László Veszprémy and Frank Schaer with a study by Jenő Szűcs) (1999). CEU Press. ISBN 963-9116-31-9.
- Bak, János M.; Veszprémy, László; Kersken, Norbert (2018). Chronica de gestis Hungarorum e codice picto saec. XIV [The Illuminated Chronicle: Chronicle of the deeds of the Hungarians from the fourteenth-century illuminated codex]. Budapest: Central European University Press. ISBN 978-9-6338-6264-3.

=== Secondary sources ===
- Csifó, Tamás (2019). "A Magyar Királyság kapcsolatai Hispániával a 12. század végén és a 13. század első felében [The connections of the Kingdom of Hungary with Hispania at the end of the 12th and in the first half of the 13th century]". Móra Akadémia (in Hungarian). 7. SZTE Móra Ferenc Kollégium: 152–174. ISSN 2064-809X.
- Engel, Pál (1996). Magyarország világi archontológiája, 1301–1457, I. [Secular Archontology of Hungary, 1301–1457, Volume I] (in Hungarian). História, MTA Történettudományi Intézete. ISBN 963-8312-44-0.
- Körmendi, Tamás (2019). "A Bánk bán és a történeti valóság [The Bánk bán and Historical Reality]". Magyaróra (in Hungarian). 1 (1–4). Anyanyelvápolók Szövetsége: 12–19. ISSN 2676-976X.
- Pór, Antal (1889). "A Nagy-Martoniak [The Nagymartonis]". Turul (in Hungarian). 7 (2): 57–70. ISSN 1216-7258.
- Skorka, Renáta (2017). "A "mohó farkas" utóda. Egy Kőszegi Habsburg-szolgálatban [The Heir of the "Greedy Wolf". A Kőszegi in the Service of the Habsburg Dukes]". Világtörténet (in Hungarian). 39 (1): 93–124. ISSN 0083-6265.
- Szabados, György (2005). "Aragóniai Konstancia, az első magyar házassági szerződés királynéja [Constance of Aragon, The Queen of the First Hungarian Marriage Contract]". Acta Universitatis Scientiarum Szegediensis: Acta Historica (in Hungarian). 122. University of Szeged: 31–41. ISSN 0324-6965.
- Zsoldos, Attila (2009). "A Nagymartoniak: egy aragóniai család Magyarországon [The Nagymartonis: an Aragonese Family in Hungary]". In Tóth, Csaba; Sarobe, Ramon (eds.). Királylányok messzi földről. Magyarország és Katalónia a középkorban (in Hungarian). Hungarian National Museum. pp. 177–189. ISBN 978-963-706-164-6.
- Zsoldos, Attila (2011). Magyarország világi archontológiája, 1000–1301 [Secular Archontology of Hungary, 1000–1301] (in Hungarian). História, MTA Történettudományi Intézete. ISBN 978-963-9627-38-3.
- Zsoldos, Attila (2024). "Harcok az ország közepén [Struggles in the middle part of the realm]". In Kovács, Gyöngyi; Csilla, Zatykó (eds.). A tudománynak gazdag ágai... Tanulmányok Benkő Elek hetvenedik születésnapjára (in Hungarian). HUN-REN Bölcsészett udományi Kutatóközpont Régészeti Intézet. pp. 455–468. ISBN 978-615-5766-73-2.
