= Bajót =

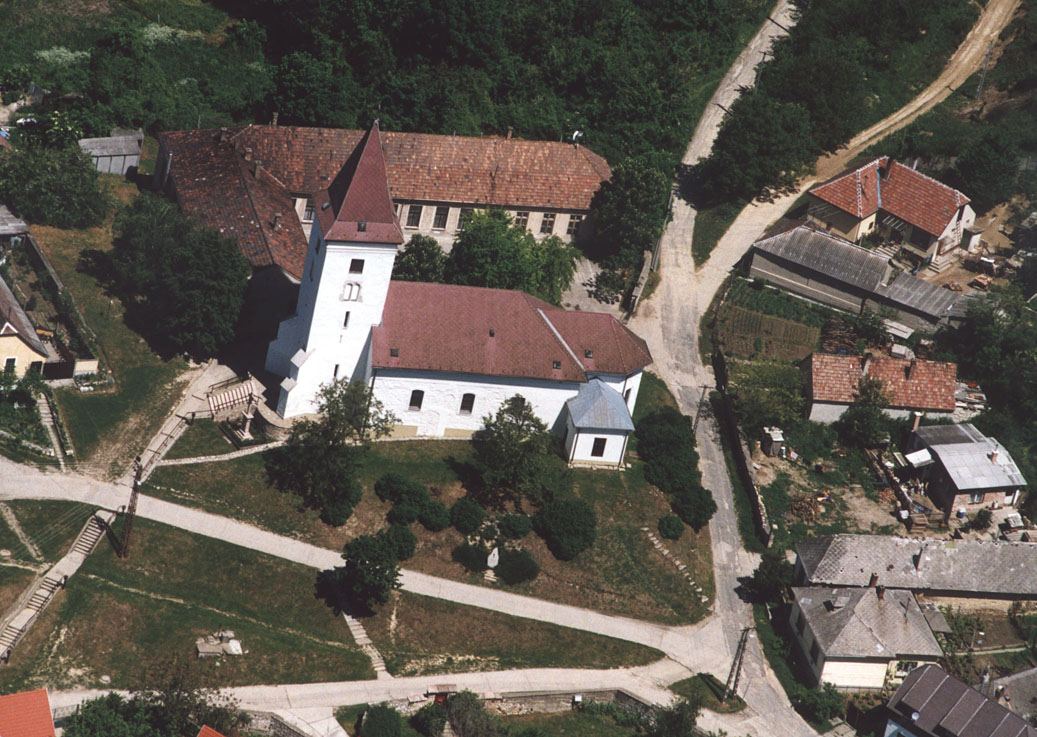
- Aerial view

- Coat of arms

- Location of Bajót in Hungary
- Coordinates: 47.7272°N 18.5558°E
- Country: Hungary
- Region: Central Transdanubia
- County: Komárom-Esztergom
- District: Esztergom

Area
  - Total: 16.44 km^{2} (6.35 sq mi)

Population (2012)
  - Total: 1,557
  - Density: 94.71/km^{2} (245.3/sq mi)
- Time zone: UTC+1 (CET)
  - Summer (DST): UTC+2 (CEST)
- Postal code: 2533
- Area code: +36 33
- Website: www.bajot.hu

Bajót is a village in Komárom-Esztergom county, Hungary.

== History ==
Simon Kézai, the chronicler of Ladislaus IV of Hungary wrote his history in the years 1282–83. In this work he reported that Prince Emeric, the son of King Béla III married Constance of Aragon. The Spanish princess was escorted to Hungary by an extremely beautiful woman, called Tóta, who later became the wife of Prince Benedict, the voivode of Transylvania. It was in a document of 1202 where King Emeric gave his permission to Benedict to bestow the settlement of Bajót on Tóta, as a wedding gift. This document was the first written mention of the settlement's name and it appeared there as Boitth. The document is closed with a golden seal and today it is kept in the State Archives of the City of Vienna. In 1221 King Andrew II returned the property to Tóta, which had formerly been taken away from her when her husband, Benedict had been exiled.

Following Tóta's death her Spanish brother, comes Simon obtained the property. Simon's family later adopted the name Nagymartoni, since in addition to Bajót they also owned the settlement of Nagymarton (today in Burgenland, Austria, by its present–day name Mattersburg). The members of the Nagymartoni family began to call themselves Fraknói from the mid-14th century onward. Their dynasty died out with Paul IV in 1438. Their coat-of-arms originally was a simple shield tinctured gules. As charges it bore two crosses in the upper chief and an eagle abaisé in the middle. The bird is turning to the sinister and looking at the cross borne on the dexter side of the shield. These charges were likely to have been bestowed on Simon as well as his brother Mihály by the Spanish king. Their figures might appear as the characters of Mikhal and Simon of Boioth in József Katona’s tragedy entitled Bánk Bán. Before Simon and Mihály moved to Hungary they had defeated the sultan of Tunis and had occupied the islands of Mallorca and Menorca for the Spanish king.

It was the same Simon and his archers who defended the castle of Esztergom from the attacks of the Mongols in the spring of 1242. This is why an arrowhead is borne in the sinister field of the settlement's coat-of-arms. Until quite recently the archbishops of Esztergom were the chief landowners of Bajót.

The charges of the settlement's coat-of-arms give a simple and a clear introduction to the settlement's history. The main charges of Bajót's coat-of-arms are as follows: a bishop's mitre in the sinister chief, an arrowhead in the dexter chief and an eagle in the centre, borne abaisé in a field gules.

The village was destroyed several times by the Turks but was repopulated each time. In 1706, the Labancs ravaged the village that had to be restored.

Coal was discovered on its borders in the 19th century, and the area was also mined.
