= Burgruine Landsee =

Castle ruins in Landsee, Austria

Coordinates: 47°33′46″N 16°20′59″E

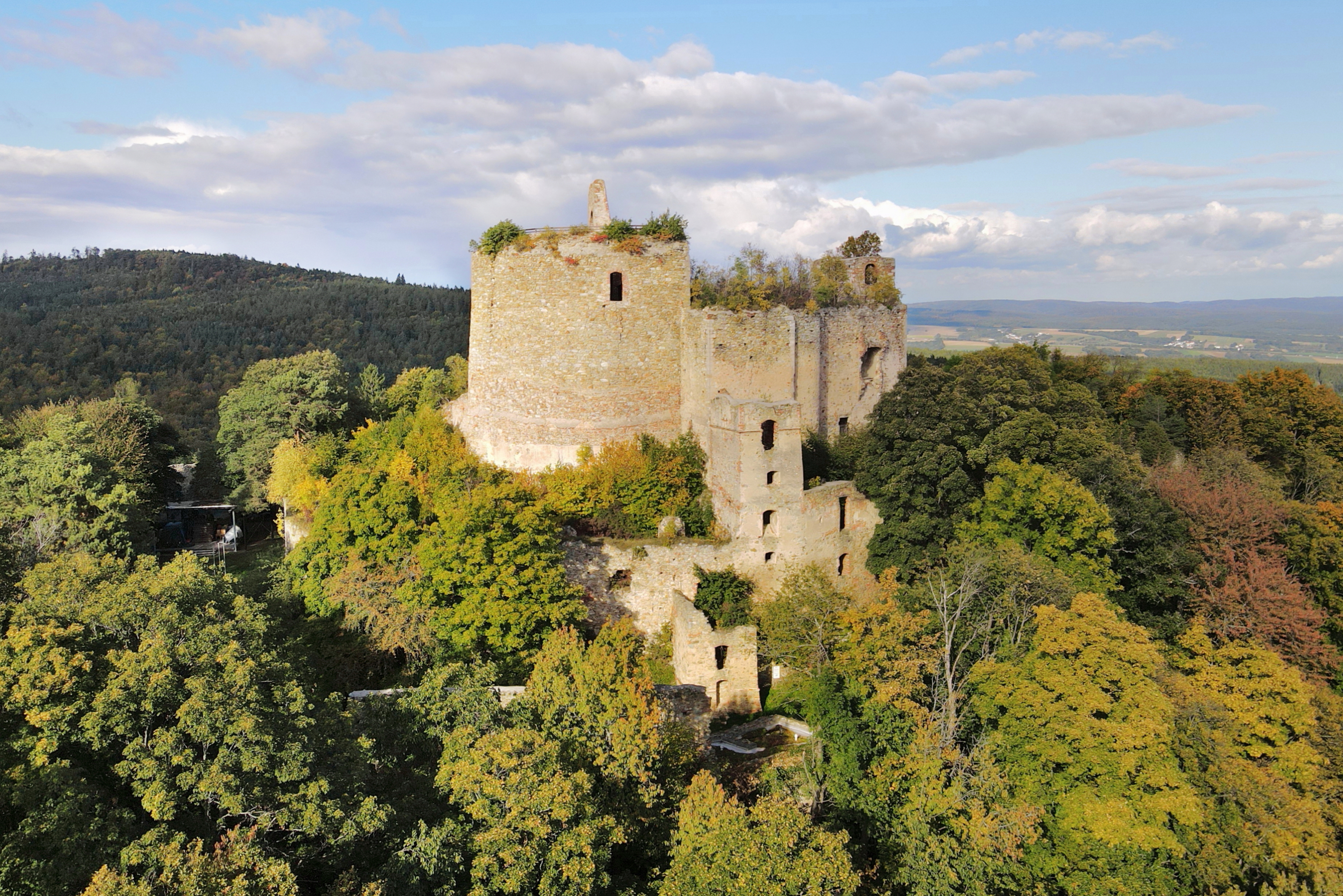

Site information
- Type: Hill castle

Site history
- Built: 1158 (868 years ago)

Burgruine Landsee is a ruined castle located in the middle of the Austrian state of Burgenland, east of the village of Landsee (ungarisch: Lánzsér) in the Markt Sankt Martin municipality in the Oberpullendorf district. It is one of the largest castle ruins in Central Europe. Burgruine Landsee stands 537 metres (1,762 ft) above sea level.

== History ==
The name has nothing to do with a lake or water body, although it could be translated as Sealand. Until the end of the Austro-Hungarian Monarchy, the castle was located in Hungary, and its name is derived from the Hungarian term "Lánzsér", derived from an originally German name written as "Landeshere". Whether a Hungarian or a German version was the first designation of the structure is not documented. Neither is it known, whether the castle was named after its owner or the name of the owner influenced that of the castle. Lánzsér is also translated as "Lanzenträger" (Lance bearer). The word "hehr..." is an old German word meaning outstanding, highly esteemed, proud, of high rank etc. Similarly, the word "Hehre" was used for "proud beauty". This name thus describes the facility as a highly esteemed castle complex at the time (a similar name formation is found with Landskron).

The earliest named nobleman associated with the areas around the castle is the eldest son of Wulfing von Prosset (also Wulfingus de Brozzat), Gottschalk von Prosset (Gotscalcus Schirling), who was a vassal of the Styrian Margrave Otakar III. For political reasons, he was strategically positioned in the far east of the Pitten area, internally against Grafschaft Pitten and externally against the Hungarians. The strategic importance of Landsee stems from it location just a few hundred meters east of the border between the Austrian territories of the Holy Roman Empire and the Kingdom of Hungary. Since 1553 Gottschalk called himself "von Landesehre". Hower that isn't the first time that name shows up in the historic record. The Urkundenbuch des Herzogthums Steiermark (collection of old documentary sources surrounding the Duchy of Styria) mentions an Erchenger von Landesehre in 1173, whose family also owned the Hohenwang Castle near Langenwang. An "Erchengerus de Landesere" is also mentioned as a witness in a document from 1179. This name is also mentioned in the rhymed chronicle of Ottokar of Horneck. These persons are seen as officials (ministerials) of the Counts of Pitten, which at that time belonged to Styria and were seen as a cadette branch of the Stubenberger family in Eastern Styria. However, by 1222, the castle already belonged to Hungary. In the 13th century, it belonged to Lorenz Athinai, the comes of Ödenburg (Sopron). In 1289, the castle was conquered by Duke Albert of Austria during his campaign against the Güssing Counts in the course of the Güssing Feud. In the mid-16th century, the castle was owned by the baronial Teufel family. Erasmus von Teufel, whose epitaph is located in the chapel of Winzendorf, was an imperial "Rat Spann und Hauptmann zu Ödenburg" and "supreme cavalry commander in Hungary". Erasmus was taken prisoner by Turks in Transylvania in 1552, where he was negotiating as the emperor's envoy, and was executed by Janissaries. According to another story, he was sunk in a sack in the Black Sea. After several changes of ownership, the castle came to Baron, later Count Nikolaus Esterházy in 1612.

On July 12, 1707, between 10 and 11 in the morning, a fire broke out, causing severe destruction on the Kobersdorf side (northeast side) of the castle, where the owner's chambers were located. Afterwards, the castle was repaired but subsequently began to deteriorate, and the demolition of some parts was already being considered. On June 2, 1790, the castle burned down again devastatingly. Its owner, Prince Nikolaus I Esterházy, known as "the Magnificent", died on September 28, 1790, in Vienna. His successor, Prince Anton had to implement strict austerity measures, due to the extravagant lifestyle of his predecessor, which left him with 3.8 million guilders in debt. Beside the financial issues, the castle has also lost its role as a border castle for quite some time, as technology had progressed and the realms of Austria and Hungary had been unified by the Habsburgs. The structure (called Schloss at the time, see the historical map) was not rebuilt and abandoned in favor of Forchtenstein Castle and the dominion of Lackenbach. In 1802, the facility was described as "ruinous". It then served as a quarry for the constructions in the area.

Since 1968, the castle ruins have been secured and made accessible to the public.

== Structure ==
The structure is approximately 300 × 200 m in size and clearly shows that the castle consisted of four rings of fortifications, the first of which was separated by two ditches. The outermost wall ring, which is poorly preserved, is the youngest. The first, simply constructed gate, bears the year 1668. The second, already heavily fortified gate, is reached by a wooden bridge over the first ditch. Beyond it, the main entrance path leads over another wooden bridge across the second ditch to the third gate. Behind this gate lies the large outer courtyard. From there, the fourth gate leads south into a narrow inner courtyard, the fifth (collapsed) gate leads to another courtyard, to the east of which the living quarters have fallen to their foundations. From there a staircase through the sixth gate reaches the central building, where the location of the kitchen can still be identified. Similar to Forchtenstein Castle, the strongest fortifications (thickest walls of the keep) face west, towards Austria, while the living quarters are located in the east, secured by steep drops. The walls of the residential tower (donjon) are up to ten meters thick. Several towers are attached to it, one of which contained the chapel. In it, a new staircase leads to the former roof area of the donjon (with a standalone, masonry arch), from which a wide view extends to the area of Sopron, the southern part of Lake Neusiedl, and the Bucklige Welt.

The castle's first chapel was dedicated to St. Ursula and was located in the chapel tower, which is part of the central section of the existing ruin. This tower was built between 1460 and 1485. The castle also had its own cemetery ("castle cemetery" on the access road to the ruin), in which the first parish church of the village Landsee was located. This church was dedicated to St. Nicholas and was described as "very old" in 1647. As part of the castle expansion from 1650 to 1679, a Baroque chapel was built, also dedicated to St. Nicholas.

In the outer courtyard, concerts, theater evenings, and other entertainment events take place during the summer months.

== On film ==
The castle was used as a location for Disney's The Three Musketeers (1993 film) starring Kiefer Sutherland, Charlie Sheen, Chris O'Donnell, and Oliver Platt.

== Gallery ==
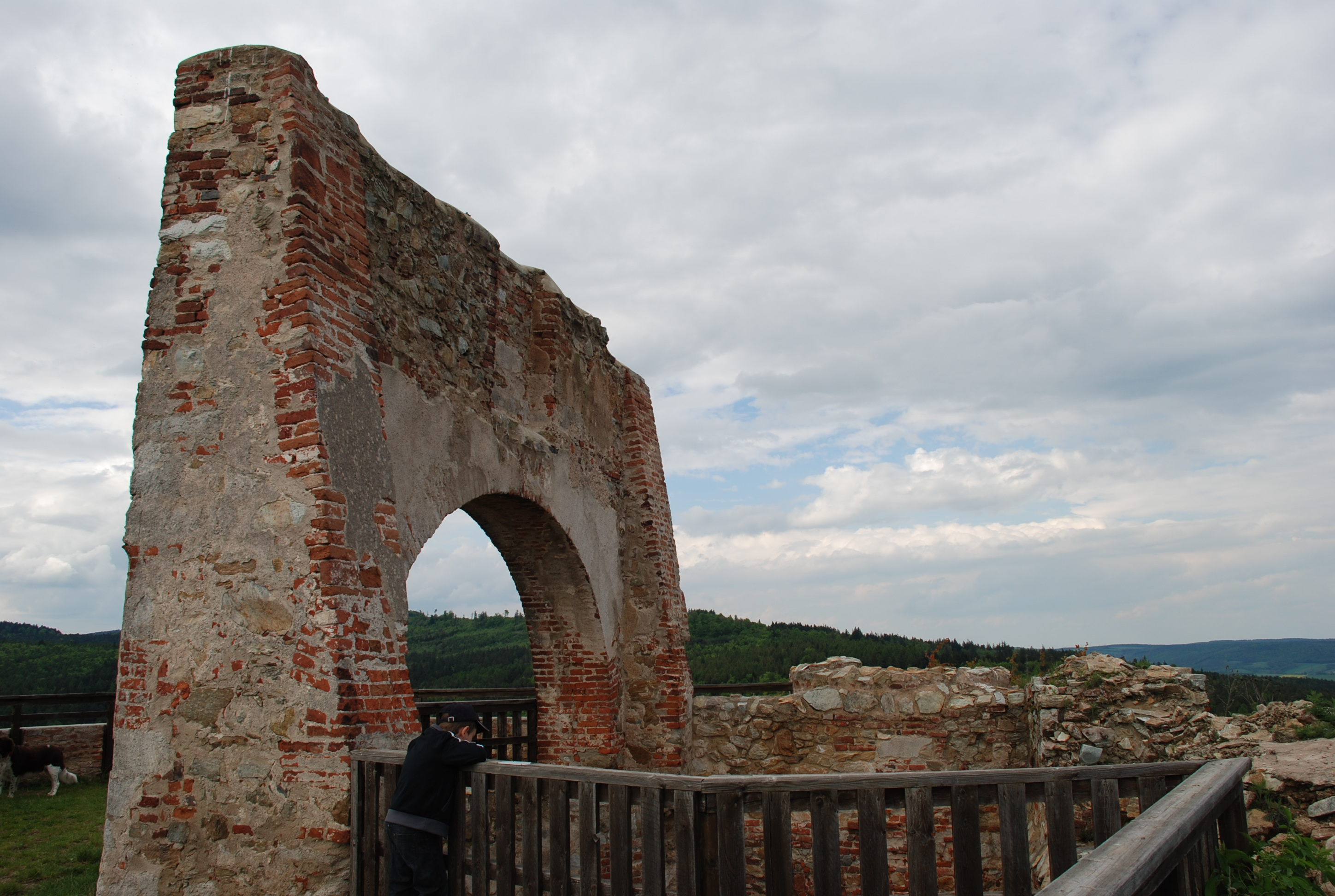
On top of the Donjon of Landsee

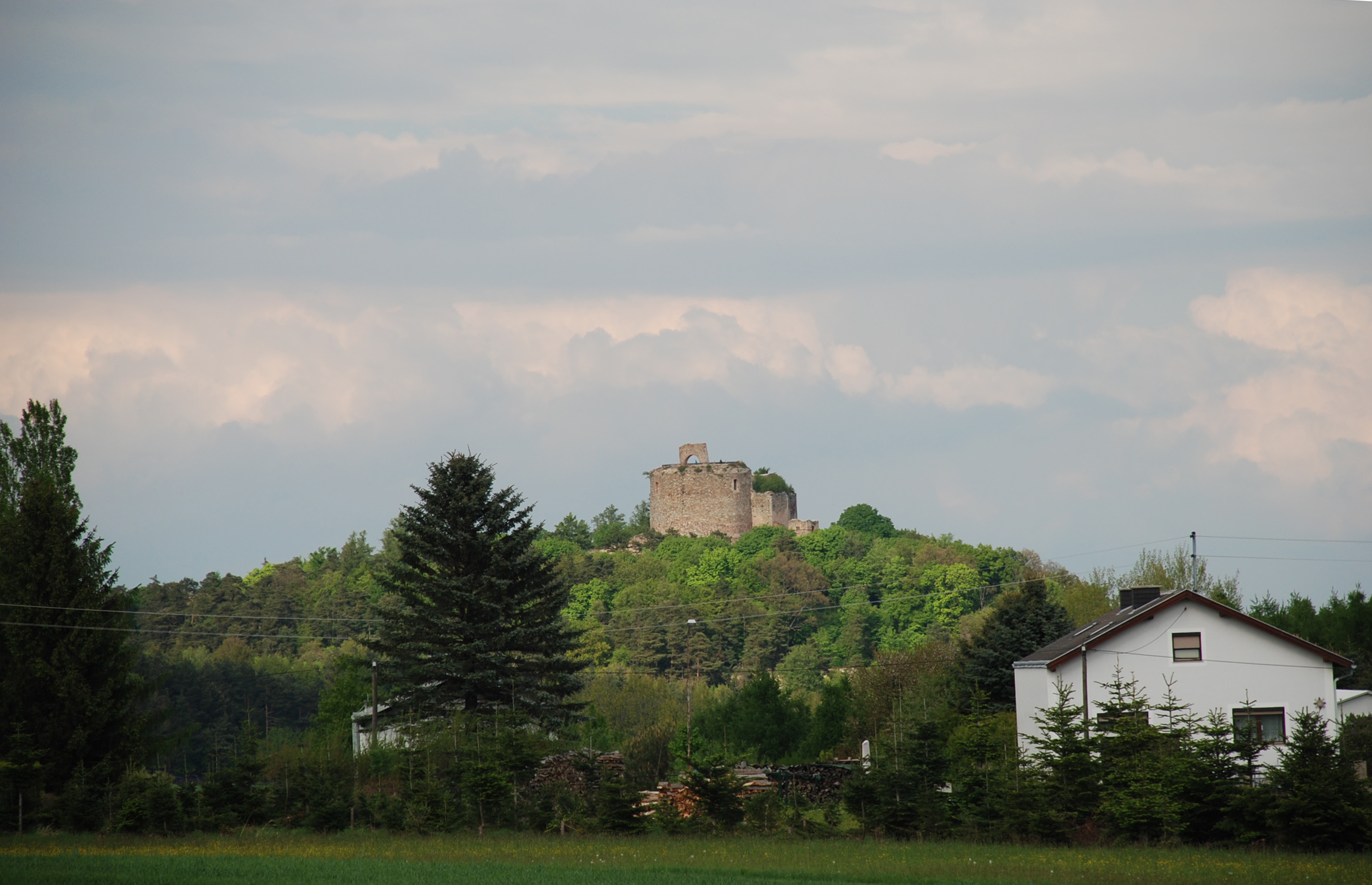
View from the south-west

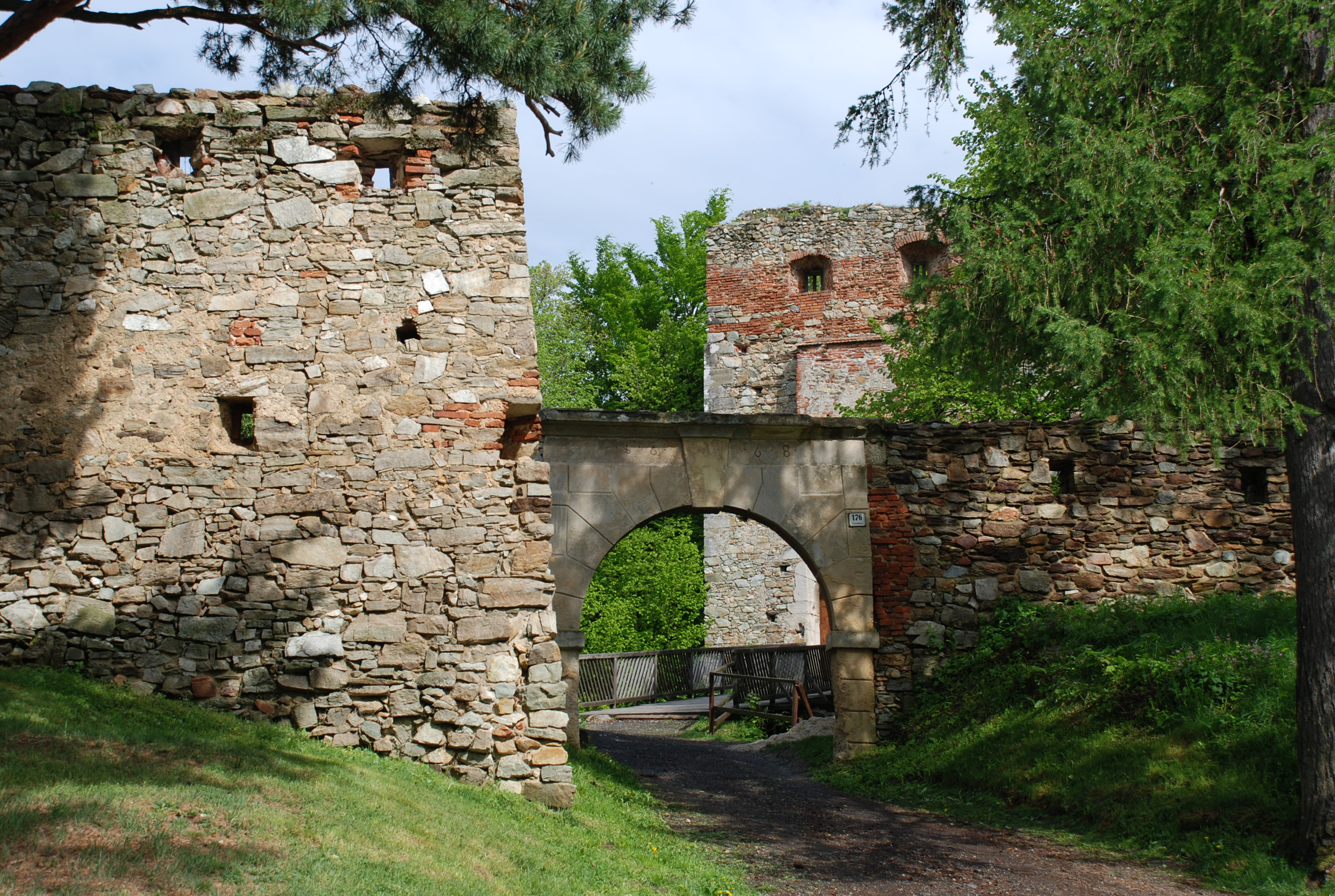
Entryway with first gate, second gate in the background

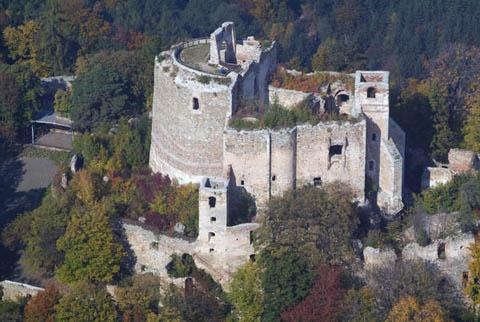
Central structure with Bergfried (Living quarters, Donjon, on the left) and chapel tower (on the right) from the south

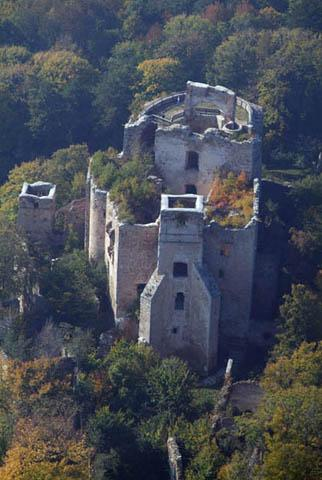
Central structure from the east

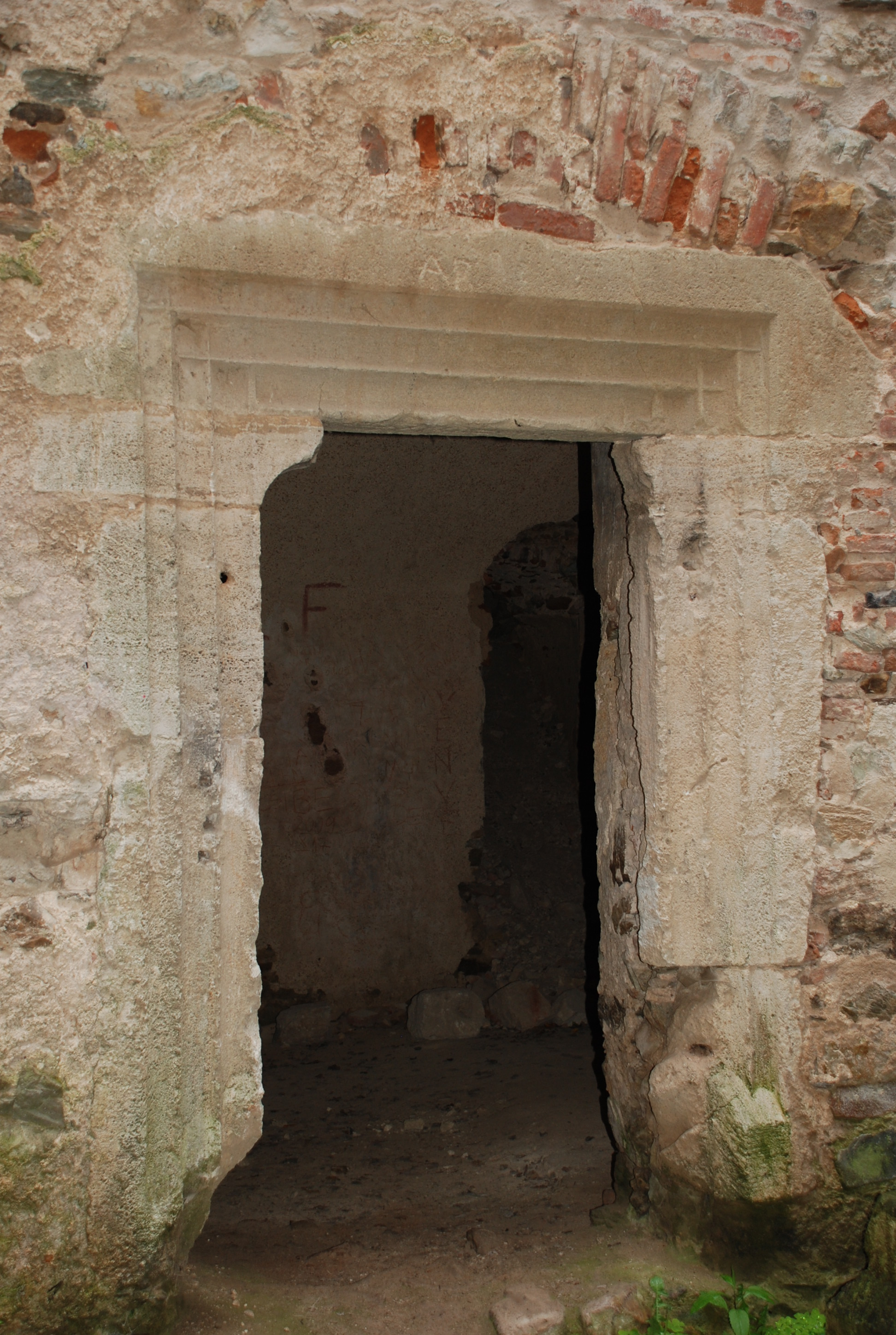
Remnants indicate formerly rich ornamentation.

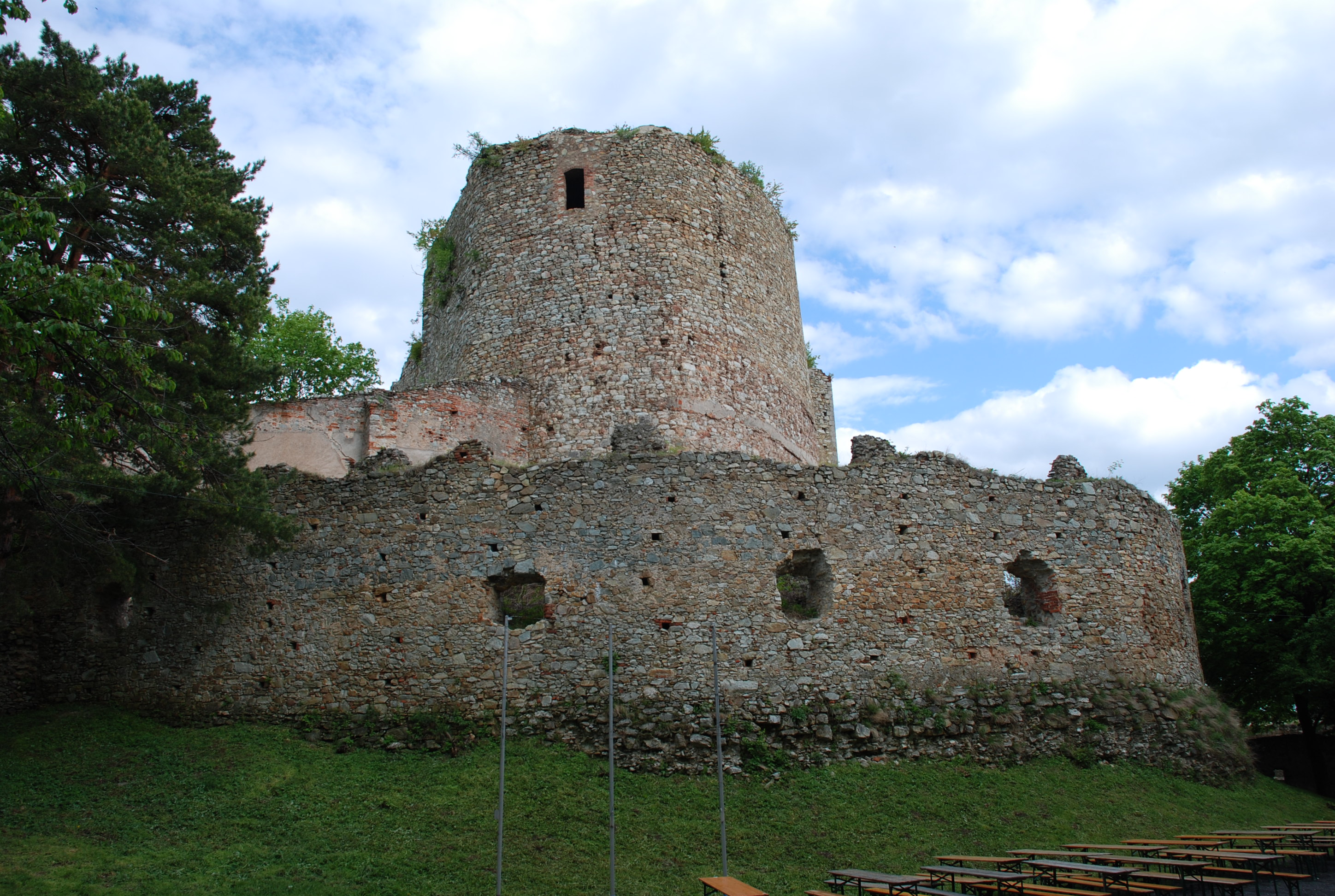
Donjon and the fourth wall, outer courtyard in the foreground

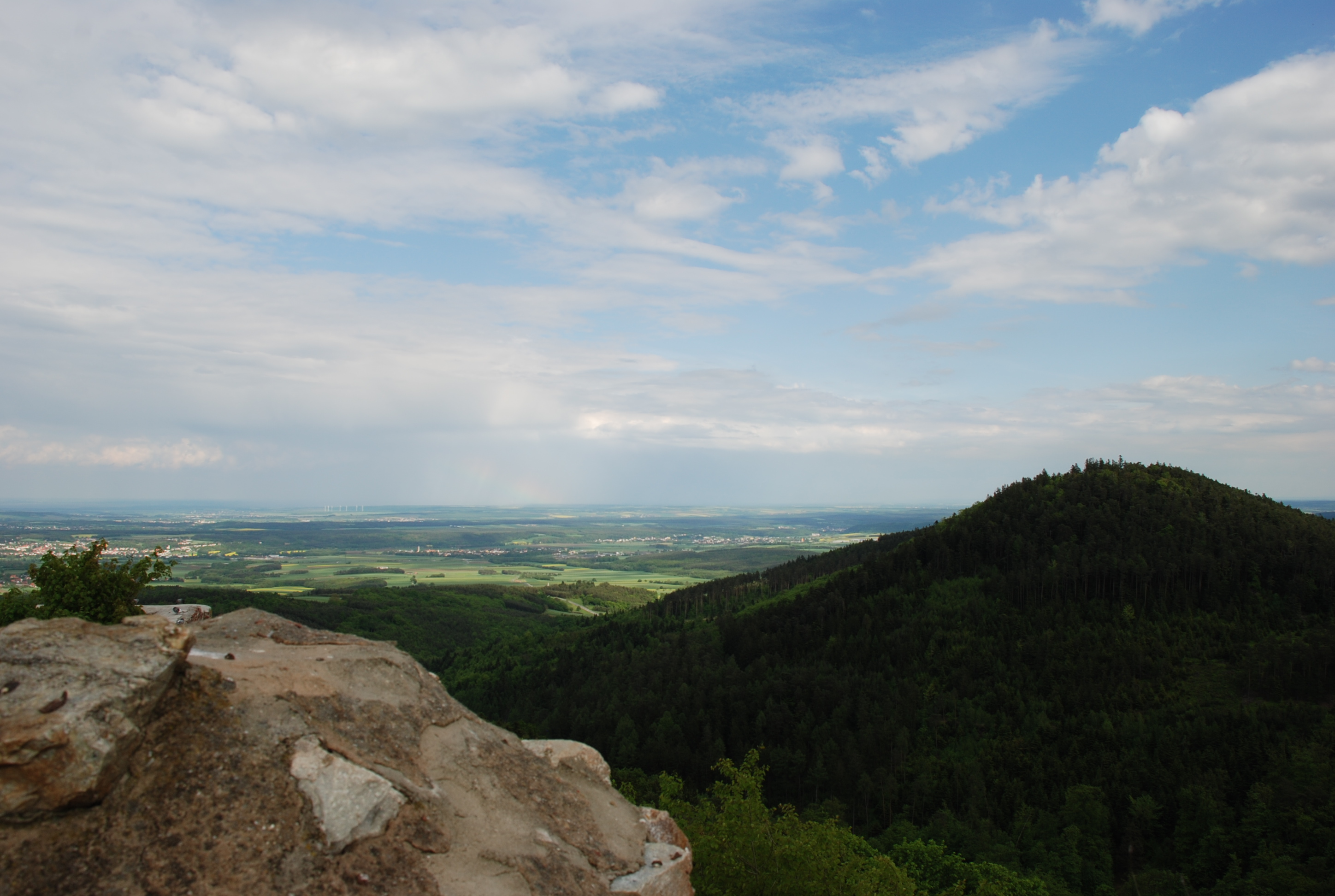
View to the east, Heidriegel mountain on the right

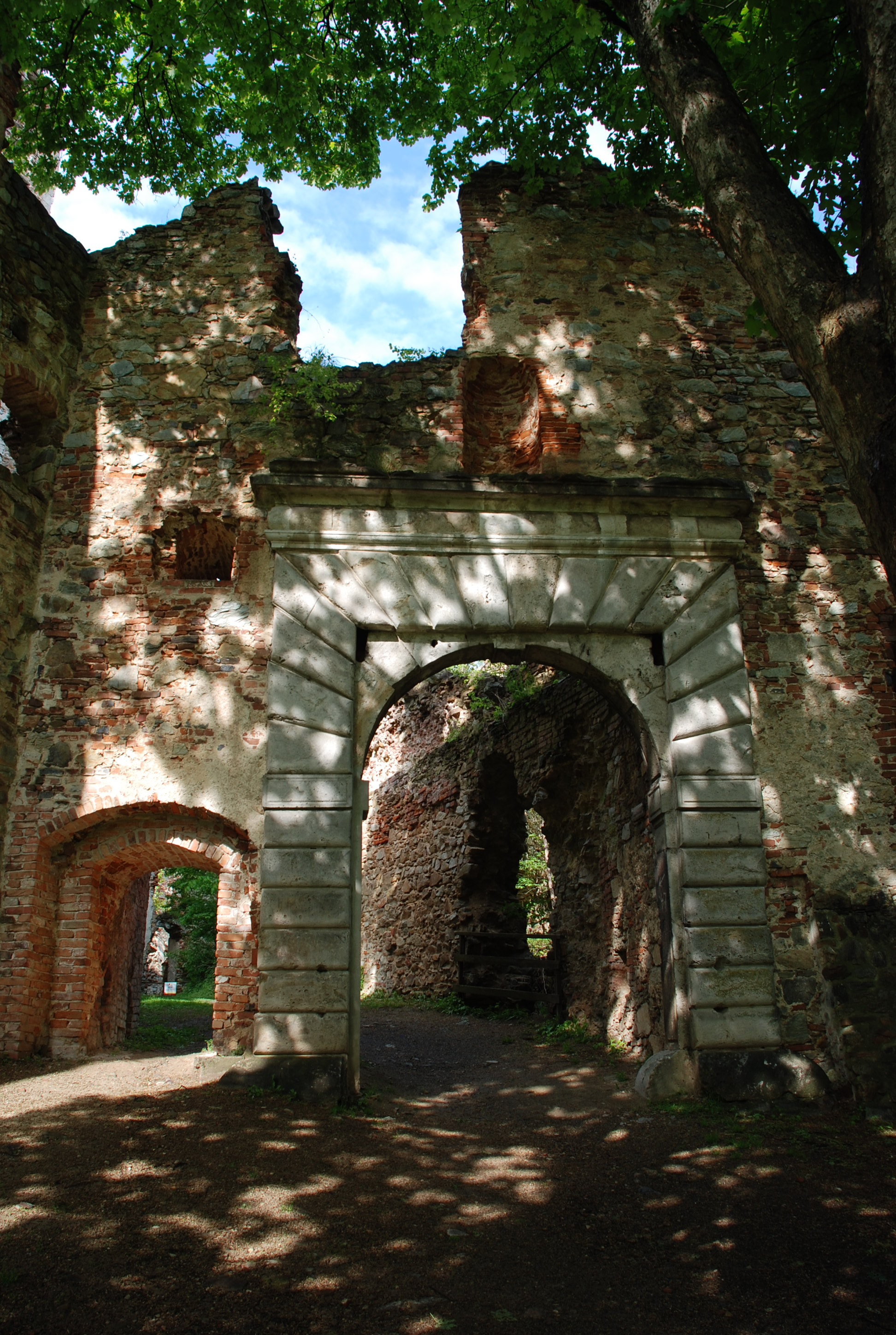
Fourth gate between inner and outer courtyard

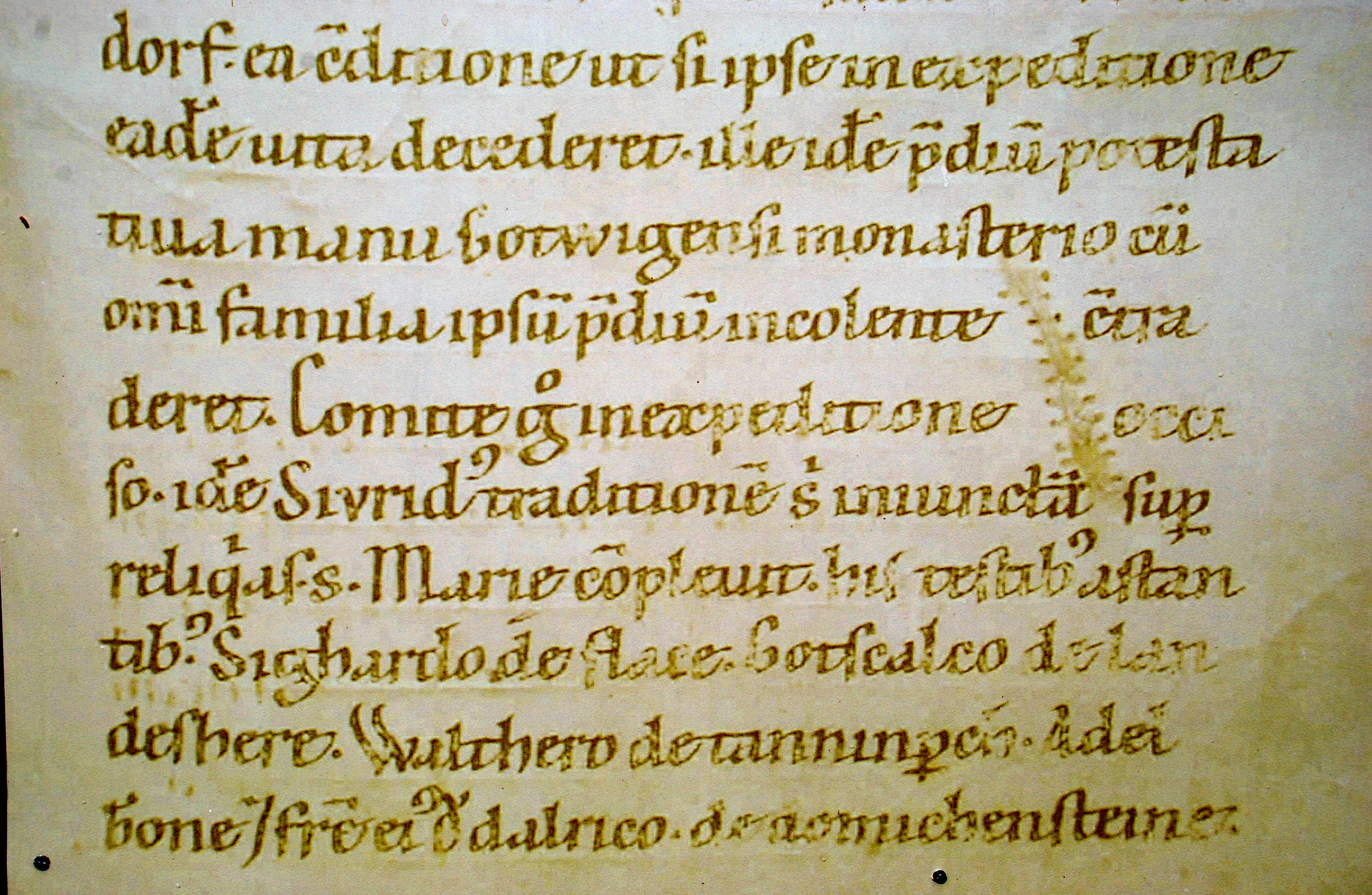
First mention of "Landeshere" (third- and second-last line), 1158

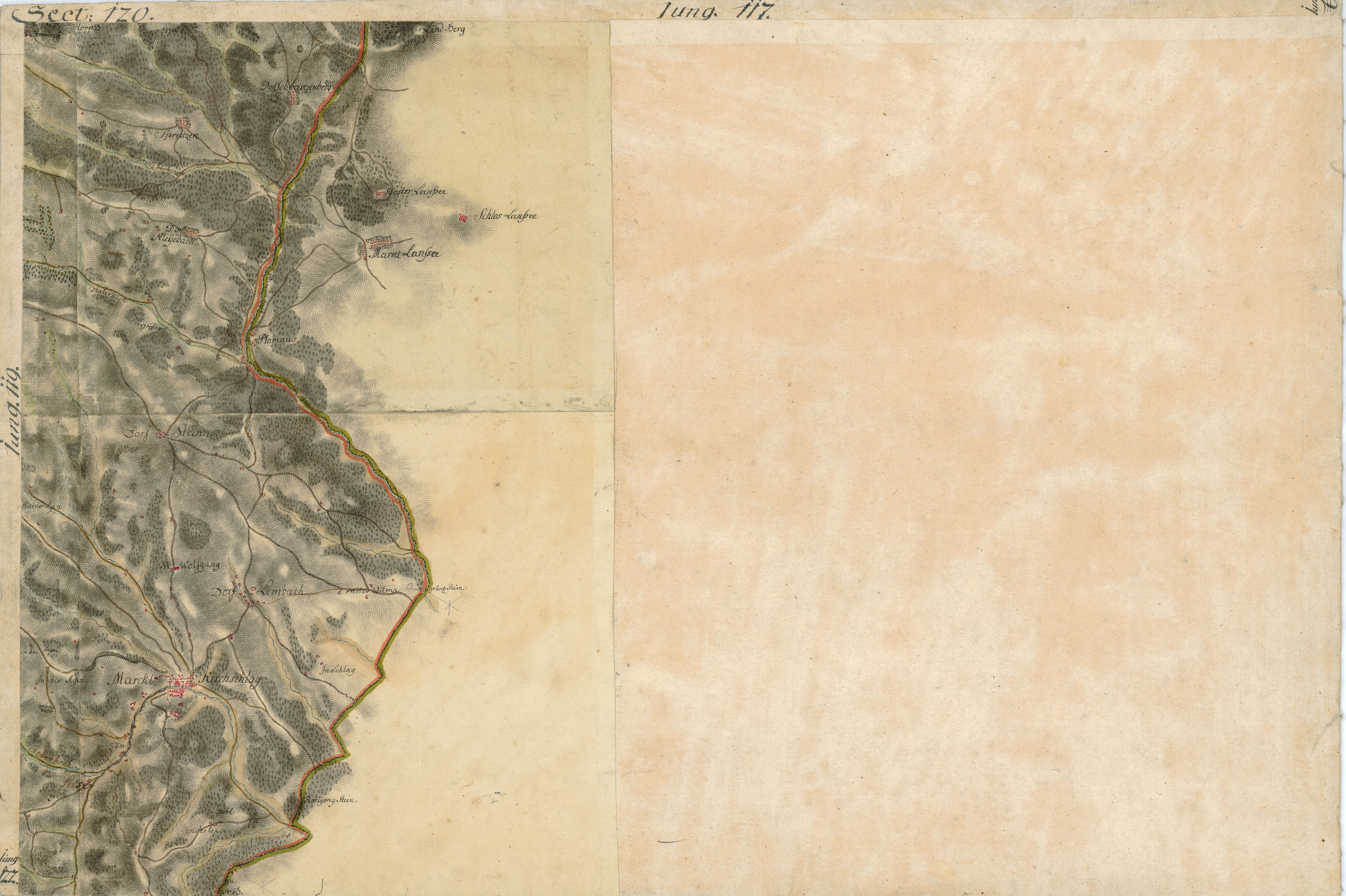
The location of the village, monastery and castle of Landsee beyond the former borders of Austria, inside Hungary at the time, around 1780 (Josephinische Landesaufnahme)

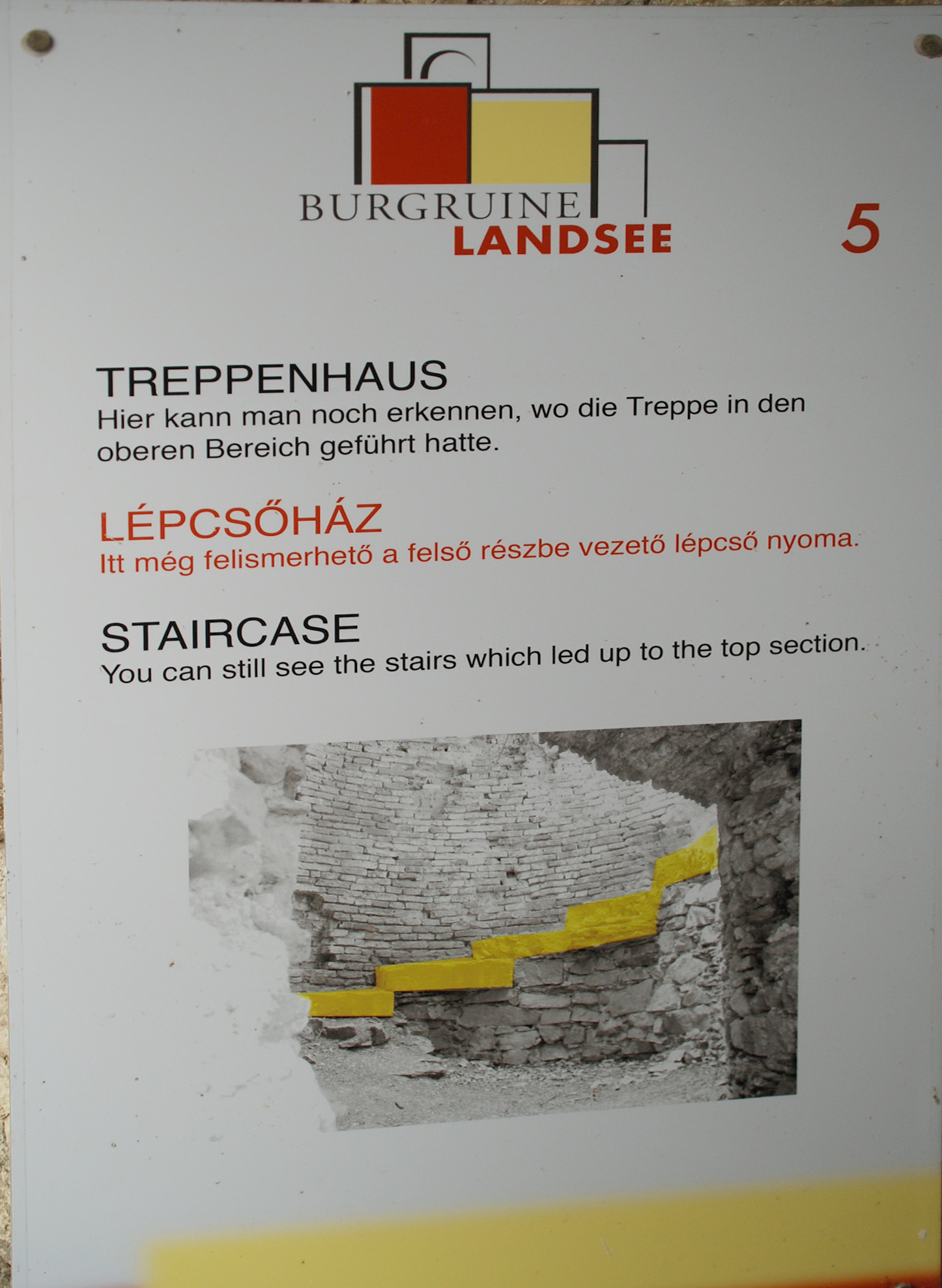
The ruins are safe and contain signs with information

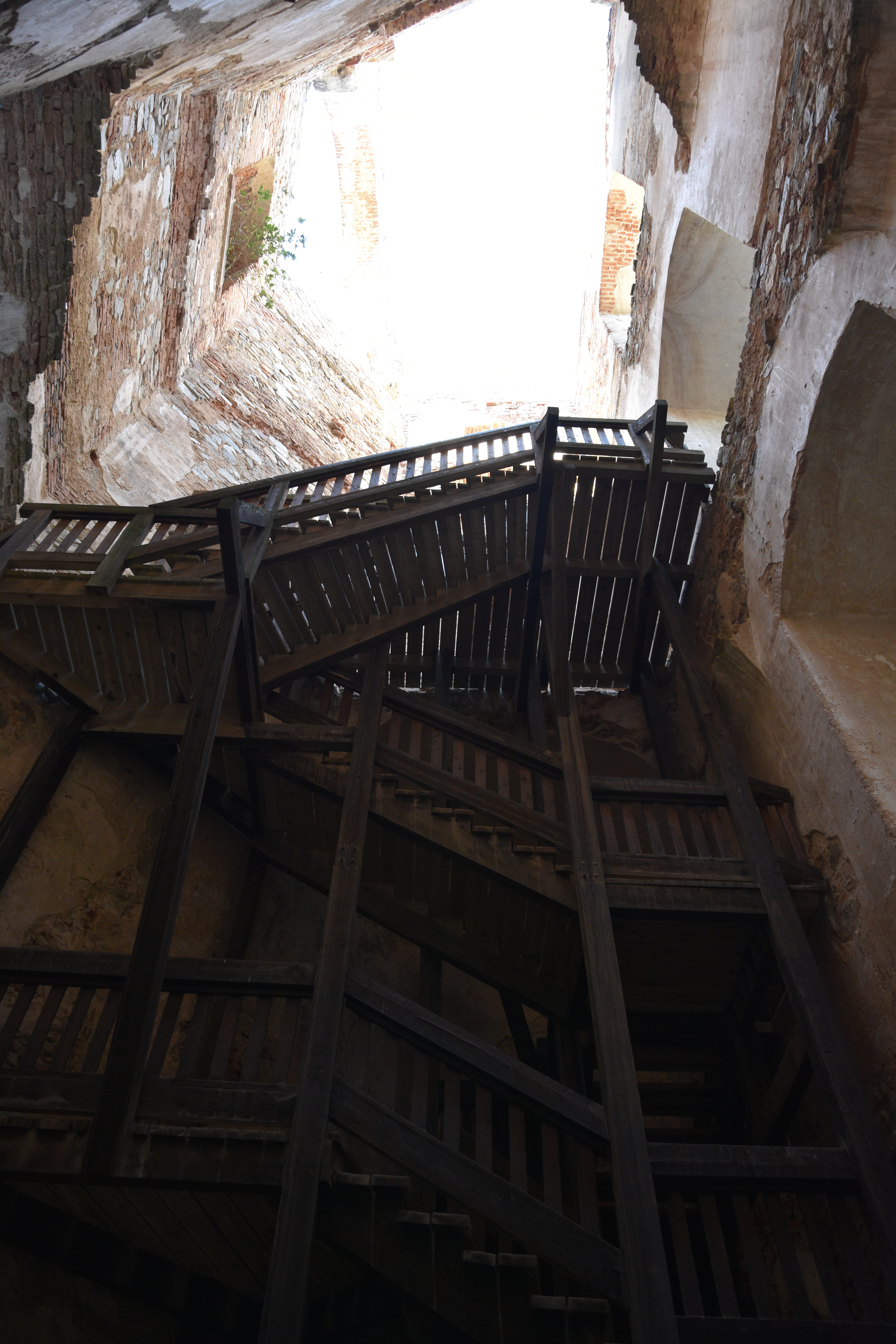
Staircase leading to the top of the Donjon

== See also ==
- List of castles in Austria
