= Simon I Nagymartoni =

Hungarian knight and diplomat

Simon (I) Nagymartoni

Ispán of Győr
- Reign: 1232–1234
- Predecessor: Héder (?)
- Successor: Nicholas Osl
- Died: after 1250
- Noble family: House of Nagymartoni
- Issue: Simon II; Michael

Simon (I) Nagymartoni (also Bajóti or Martinsdorfi, Hungarian: Nagymartoni (I.) Simon; died after 1250) was an Aragonese-born Hungarian knight and diplomat in the first half of the 13th century. He and his siblings settled down in Hungary, where the family integrated into the social elite. Simon was a faithful confidant of kings Andrew II and Béla IV.

== Migration to Hungary ==
The kindred of Simon and his brother Michael is called by the name of Martinsdorf. They came from Hispania in the time of King Andrew, son of Béla III. This kindred has many castles in Hispania, of which one, which is the finest, is called Boiot. The grandfather of this Simon [II] fought for many years against the king of Aragon, until at last he was captured by the king and put in prison. This made Count Simon and Bertram afraid, and they came to Hungary with the said King Andrew's second wife [Yolanda of Courtenay], who was from Champagne [sic!]. There is in Hispania no kindred which dares to carry an eagle in its coat of arms except that of Simon and Michael; and the reason is that this kindred is said to have driven out the army of the sultan of Tunis [Abu Zakariya Yahya] when he had attacked with ships the islands of Majorca and Minorca and had defeated the fleet while the other warriors of the king of Aragon were unable to withstand him. It was therefore decreed by the king and the council of the knights that the coat of arms of the kindred which hitherto had only been red without any figure should be changed to show an eagle.

— Illuminated Chronicle

The kindred of Count Simon and his brother Count Michael, surnamed Martinsdorf, came to Hungary in the days of King Emeric, the son of Béla III. They entered in grand style, bringing with them King Emeric's bride Constance, the daughter of the King of Aragon, as well as distinguished knights and a most splendid retinue. The story goes that for certain just reasons their kindred had long been at odds with a particular great count, and that finally they gathered an army and took to the field against him. The count was taken prisoner and strangled on the orders of Simon, the father of Count Simon and Count Michael, and Bertram, their father's brother. The ensuing enmity was what first brought Simon and Bertram to Pannonia [Hungary] with the aforesaid queen. Having had proof of their noble qualities, King Emeric received them with open arms and is recorded to have granted them extensive fiefs in various parts of Hungary. This kindred possesses a number of castles in the kingdom of Spain, one of which, their chief seat, is named Boiot, and it was after this place that the counts and their descendants named their first settlement near Nyergesújfalu "Bajót". [...]

— Simon of Kéza: The Deeds of the Hungarians

The arrival of Simon and his family to Hungary is narrated by two near-contemporary chroniclers, Ákos (early 1270s) – whose work is partially preserved by the 14th-century Illuminated Chronicle – and Simon of Kéza, the author of The Deeds of the Hungarians (early 1280s). The circumstances and time of their arrival are narrated differently by the two chroniclers. While Ákos claims the kinship came to Hungary belonging to the accompaniment of Queen Yolanda of Courtenay, who became the second wife of King Andrew II of Hungary in 1215, Simon of Kéza narrates that the family escorted Constance of Aragon, the wife of King Emeric to Hungary at the turn of the 12th and 13th centuries. While both authors mention their castles in the Iberian Peninsula ("Boiot"), their clashes against the "sultan of Tunis" (plausibly Abu Zakariya Yahya) in Mallorca and Menorca and the coat-of-arms donation derived therefrom, but, the two authors disagree as to why they left Aragon; according to Ákos, the unidentified father of Simon I and Bertrand (or Bertram) rebelled against King James I of Aragon, which resulted his imprisonment. His young sons decided to flee the kingdom and seek refuge in Hungary. In contrast, Simon of Kéza writes the brothers embroiled into a conflict with an unidentified count and though they defeated him, the resulting hostility forced them to settle in Hungary. In addition, Simon of Kéza does not omit to mention Tota, the sister of Simon and Bertrand, who was lady-in-waiting of Queen Constance and married the powerful lord Benedict, son of Korlát in 1201 or 1202. She was granted the estates Nagymarton (or Mattersdorf, present-day Mattersburg, Austria) in Sopron County and Bajót in Esztergom County as part of her inheritable dowry from her husband Benedict, which laid the foundations for the social rise of the Nagymartoni family in Hungary.

While Tota indeed was a lady-in-waiting of Queen Constance, it is not probable that Simon and Bertrand had also came to Hungary during the reign of King Emeric. The 1202 donation letter to Tota narrates that she left behind her parents, siblings and relatives, when escorted Constance to Hungary. A charter of Andrew II from 1223 refers to that Simon previously came to visit her sister to Hungary, when he wheedled himself into Andrew's confidence to such an extent that the monarch encouraged him to settle in the kingdom. Historian Attila Zsoldos also argued Simon and Bertrand arrived to Hungary only during the reign of Andrew II. Antal Pór assumed the younger brother Bertrand settled in Hungary even later. Zsoldos considered if anyone from the family, only Bertrand participated in the conquest of Majorca (1228–1231), but he settled down in Hungary too before 1241.

== Career in Hungary ==
=== Confidant of Andrew II ===
Coat-of-arms of Bajót, derived from the shield of Nagymartonis

Simon is referred to as with the epithets "Latinus", "Hispanus", "Yspanus" and "de Yspania" in contemporary Hungarian documents. His name first appears in Hungary as a member of the entourage of Duke Béla in 1220. Subsequently, he was considered one of the faithful confidants of King Andrew II. He served as ispán of Bars County in 1221. For his service, Simon was granted the land Röjtökör in Sopron County (Rahtukeuri, present-day Neudörfl, Austria) together with its local border duty by Andrew II in 1223. The settlement lay along the river Leitha, which determined its significance in Western Transdanubia. He was inducted to the possession by Maurice Pok. However, Teha (or Teka), a royal chamberlain of Jewish origin, contested the monarch's decision; Teha relied on a charter issued before 1228 against the donation, but despite repeated requests, he did not present the alleged document at the royal court. Therefore Andrew II confirmed Simon's right of ownership over Röjtökör and declared Teha's charter as invalid and non-authentic in 1228. Meanwhile, his sister Tota died childless sometime between 1221 and 1230. Her wealth – Bajót and Nagymarton – was inherited by Simon, who, however, was forced to prove the legitimacy of his ownership right over the latter place during a lawsuit against the sons of the original owner and disloyal Ayan in 1230. His family derived its surname – Nagymartoni and, less frequently, Bajóti – from these two villages until the first half of the 14th century. Sometime around the late 1220s, Simon was also granted the land Csenke in Esztergom County (laid near present-day Mužla, Slovakia) by Andrew II.

Andrew II permitted the aforementioned Teha in 1232 to sell his estate Besenyő (present-day Pöttsching, Austria), which had previously been acquired by his father as a royal donation, to Simon for 500 marks, in exchange for settling his debt to the royal chamber. By that time, Simon belonged to the king's innermost circle. He served as ispán of Győr County from 1232 to 1234, but it is plausible that he held the dignity until Andrew's death in 1235. Simon was a member of that three-member diplomatic delegation, along with Palatine Denis, son of Ampud and Rembald de Voczon, to the Holy See in the first half of 1232, which the king sent to complain against Robert, Archbishop of Esztergom, who put Hungary under an interdict in February, because of the employment of Jews and Muslims in the royal administration. Simon was also among those barons, who swore to the oath of Bereg in September 1233. Simon acted as pristaldus (royal bailiff) in 1235 in order to induct Andrew Igmánd as the new proprietor of a portion in Csanak near Igmánd in Komárom County.

=== Fighting the Mongols ===
They [the Mongols] could not take the citadel of the city [Esztergom], because the Spaniard Simon [Symeon Hispanus] manfully defended it with his many crossbowmen.

— Master Roger's Epistle to the Sorrowful Lament upon the Destruction of the Kingdom of Hungary by the Tatars

Béla IV ascended the Hungarian throne in 1235. Unlike many barons of his father Andrew, Simon did not fall out of the king's favor, although his land Csenke was confiscated from him and given to the chamberlain Teha by King Béla. It is possible that Teha had some legal basis over the land Röjtökör, and Béla had compensated him with Csenke.

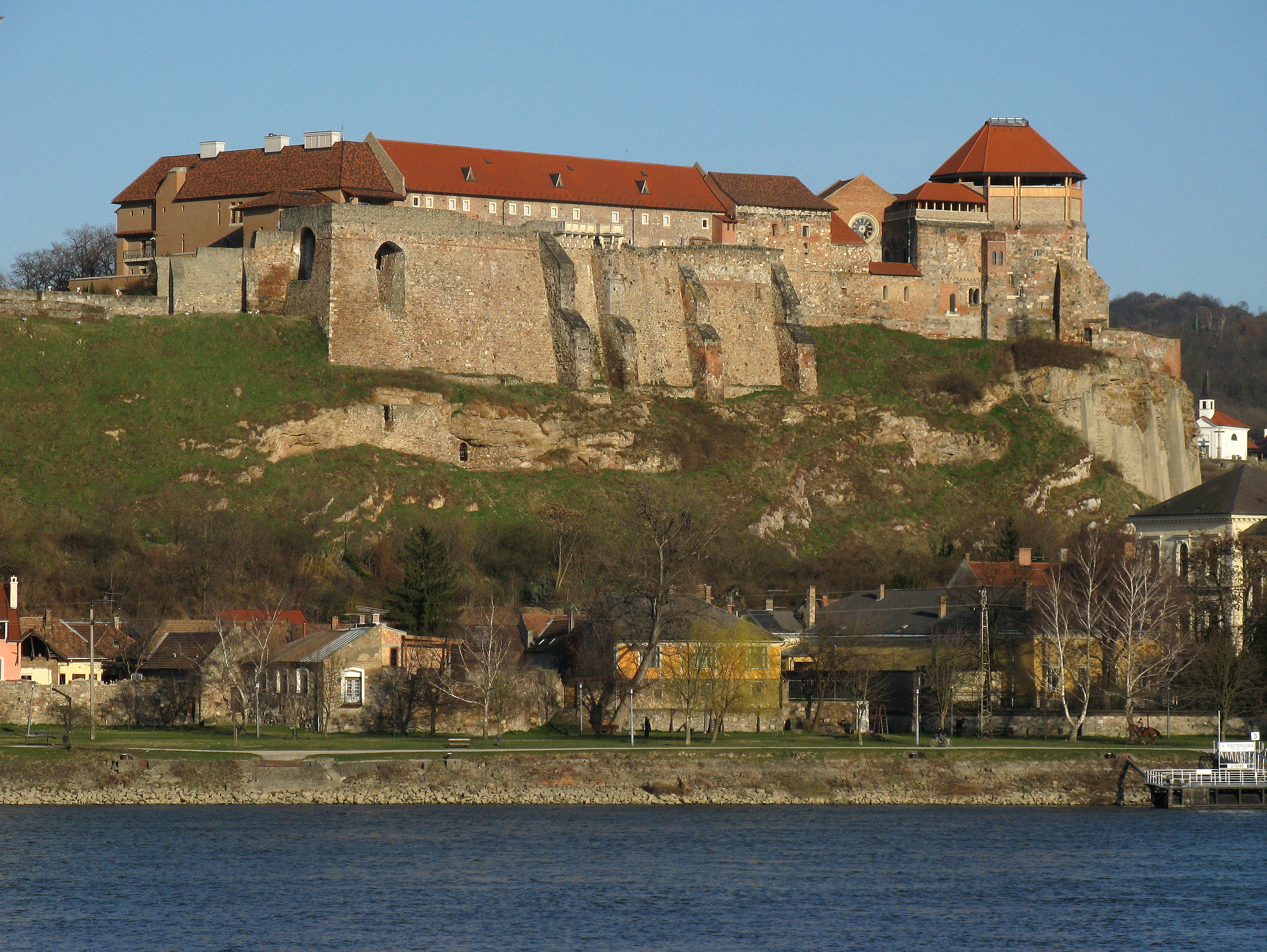
The stone walls of Esztergom Castle, defended by Simon during the first Mongol invasion of Hungary

When the Mongols invaded Hungary in the spring of 1241, Simon played a major role in the forthcoming months. Both Simon and Bertrand participated in the disastrous Battle of Mohi on 11 April 1241. While Béla IV and the royal court fled to Dalmatia thereafter, Simon was among those barons of noblemen, who organized the armed resistance against the Mongols in 1241–1242. The contemporary Roger of Torre Maggiore narrates in detail his role in the subsequent military operations. While the Mongols proceeded to lay waste to most of unfortified places in eastern Hungary, majority of the Hungarians took shelter in castles and fortified churches in Upper Hungary and Transdanubia. Simon commanded the garrison in Esztergom Castle. In early 1242, the Mongols crossed the frozen Danube, hoping to pillage the richest territories of Hungary, in addition to chase and capture King Béla. Batu Khan decided to assault Esztergom in January 1242. The invaders battered the walls of Esztergom with 30 catapults and stone throwers. They easily reduced the walls and wooden towers, and had prisoners fill the moat with earth. Master Roger states that when the Hungarians and foreigners in the city realized it was going to fall, they torched their houses along with huge amounts of dyed fabrics and any other valuable commodities. They also slaughtered the animals and buried their gold and silver, or sent it to the citadel, the only fully stone fortification in the city. Many burghers also retreated to the citadel. While the rest of the city was sacked, Simon and his soldiers successfully defended the citadel. Batu ordered his engineers to batter down the walls of the citadel, hoping to get at the valuables inside, but the catapults failed to do sufficient damage, forcing him to attempt to storm the citadel. The Mongols were beaten back time after time, with Roger noting the effectiveness of Simon's crossbowmen in inflicting enormous damage on the Mongol force (the exact term Roger used, "balistarii", was used in most contemporary sources to refer to crossbowmen; despite some confusion, he and other contemporary chroniclers usually referred to siege engines such as ballistas as "machina"). After heavy casualties, Batu lifted the siege and marched towards to western Transdanubia, leaving Esztergom behind.

Following the siege of Esztergom, Simon and Bertrand have completed diplomatic missions several times throughout the year 1242 on behalf of Béla IV in order to seek military assistance and financial aid against the Mongols. As a reward for his military merits, Béla IV returned the land Csenke with its accessory island in Esztergom County to Simon in January 1243. The brothers were granted several lands from the king simultaneously – Béla detached the estate Gadundorf from Moson Castle in Moson County, Zolonta from Pozsony Castle (present-day a borough of Okoč, Slovakia), Pucyn from Sopron Castle, Kesző in Vágköz (the area between Danube and Vág [Váh]) from Komárom Castle and handed over these estates to Simon and Bertrand. Béla also entrusted the brothers to populate, cultivate and develop these lands, whose population has fled or died during the Mongol invasion. Béla IV also confirmed Simon's right to possess Röjtökör in June 1243. It is possible he acquired additional landholdings in Esztergom County through a royal donation either in 1243 or 1244.

Around November 1250, Béla IV sent Simon to the Holy See in order to deliver his famous "Tartar letter" to Pope Innocent IV. The Hungarian monarch sought assistance from the pope against a planned new Mongol invasion. Béla requested Pope Innocent to receive his emissaries, Simon Nagymartoni and Bartholomew le Gros, the Bishop of Pécs, who stayed in his family estates in Burgundy and never returned to Hungary after a former legation, and listen their report on the situation of Hungary and the difficulties in defending against the Mongols. For historical and philological reasons, historian Imre Szentpétery dated the letter to the year 1250. There are arguments for other dates, such as 1248, 1253 or 1254. This is the last information on Simon, he died sometime after 1250. His marriage with an unidentified noblewoman produced two sons, Simon (II) and Michael, who first appeared in contemporary documents in the 1270s. The Nagymartoni family, which flourished until 1446, descended from the two sons of Simon. The family reached its peak in politics and elite, when his grandson Paul served as Judge royal for two decades in the first half of the 14th century.

== Sources ==
=== Primary sources ===
- Master Roger's Epistle to the Sorrowful Lament upon the Destruction of the Kingdom of Hungary by the Tatars (Translated and Annotated by János M. Bak and Martyn Rady) (2010). In: Rady, Martyn; Veszprémy, László; Bak, János M. (2010); Anonymus and Master Roger; CEU Press; ISBN 978-9639776951.
- Simon of Kéza: The Deeds of the Hungarians (Edited and translated by László Veszprémy and Frank Schaer with a study by Jenő Szűcs) (1999). CEU Press. ISBN 963-9116-31-9.
- Bak, János M.; Veszprémy, László; Kersken, Norbert (2018). Chronica de gestis Hungarorum e codice picto saec. XIV [The Illuminated Chronicle: Chronicle of the deeds of the Hungarians from the fourteenth-century illuminated codex]. Budapest: Central European University Press. ISBN 978-9-6338-6264-3.

=== Secondary sources ===
- Bárány, Attila (2010). "Esztergom, Siege of". In Rogers, Clifford J. (ed.). The Oxford Encyclopedia of Medieval Warfare and Military Technology, Volume I. Oxford University Press. ISBN 978-0-19-533403-6.
- Csifó, Tamás (2019). "A Magyar Királyság kapcsolatai Hispániával a 12. század végén és a 13. század első felében [The connections of the Kingdom of Hungary with Hispania at the end of the 12th and in the first half of the 13th century]". Móra Akadémia (in Hungarian). 7. SZTE Móra Ferenc Kollégium: 152–174. ISSN 2064-809X.
- Makkai, László; Mezey, László (1960). Árpád-kori és Anjou-kori levelek: XI–XIV. század [Letters from the Ages of Árpáds and Angevins: 11–14th Centuries] (PDF) (in Hungarian). Gondolat Kiadó.
- Pór, Antal (1889). "A Nagy-Martoniak [The Nagymartonis]". Turul (in Hungarian). 7 (2): 57–70. ISSN 1216-7258.
- Weisz, Boglárka (1999). "Zsidó kamaraispánok az Árpád-korban [Jewish Ispáns of Chamber in the Age of Árpáds]". In Homonnai, Sarolta; Piti, Ferenc; Tóth, Ildikó (eds.). Tanulmányok a középkori magyar történelemről. Az I. Medievisztikai PhD-konferencia (Szeged, 1999. július 2.) előadásai (in Hungarian). University of Szeged. pp. 151–161. ISBN 963-482-421-8.
- Zsoldos, Attila (2009). "A Nagymartoniak: egy aragóniai család Magyarországon [The Nagymartonis: an Aragonese Family in Hungary]". In Tóth, Csaba; Sarobe, Ramon (eds.). Királylányok messzi földről. Magyarország és Katalónia a középkorban (in Hungarian). Hungarian National Museum. pp. 177–189. ISBN 978-963-706-164-6.
- Zsoldos, Attila (2011). Magyarország világi archontológiája, 1000–1301 [Secular Archontology of Hungary, 1000–1301] (in Hungarian). História, MTA Történettudományi Intézete. ISBN 978-963-9627-38-3.

Simon I House of Nagymartoni Born: ? Died: after 1250
Political offices
Preceded by Radulph (?)	Ispán of Bars; 1221	Succeeded by Lucas Péc (?)
Preceded by Héder (?)	Ispán of Győr; 1232–1234	Succeeded by Nicholas Osl
