= Forchtenstein Castle =

Building in Forchtenstein, Austria

- Burgenland, Austria
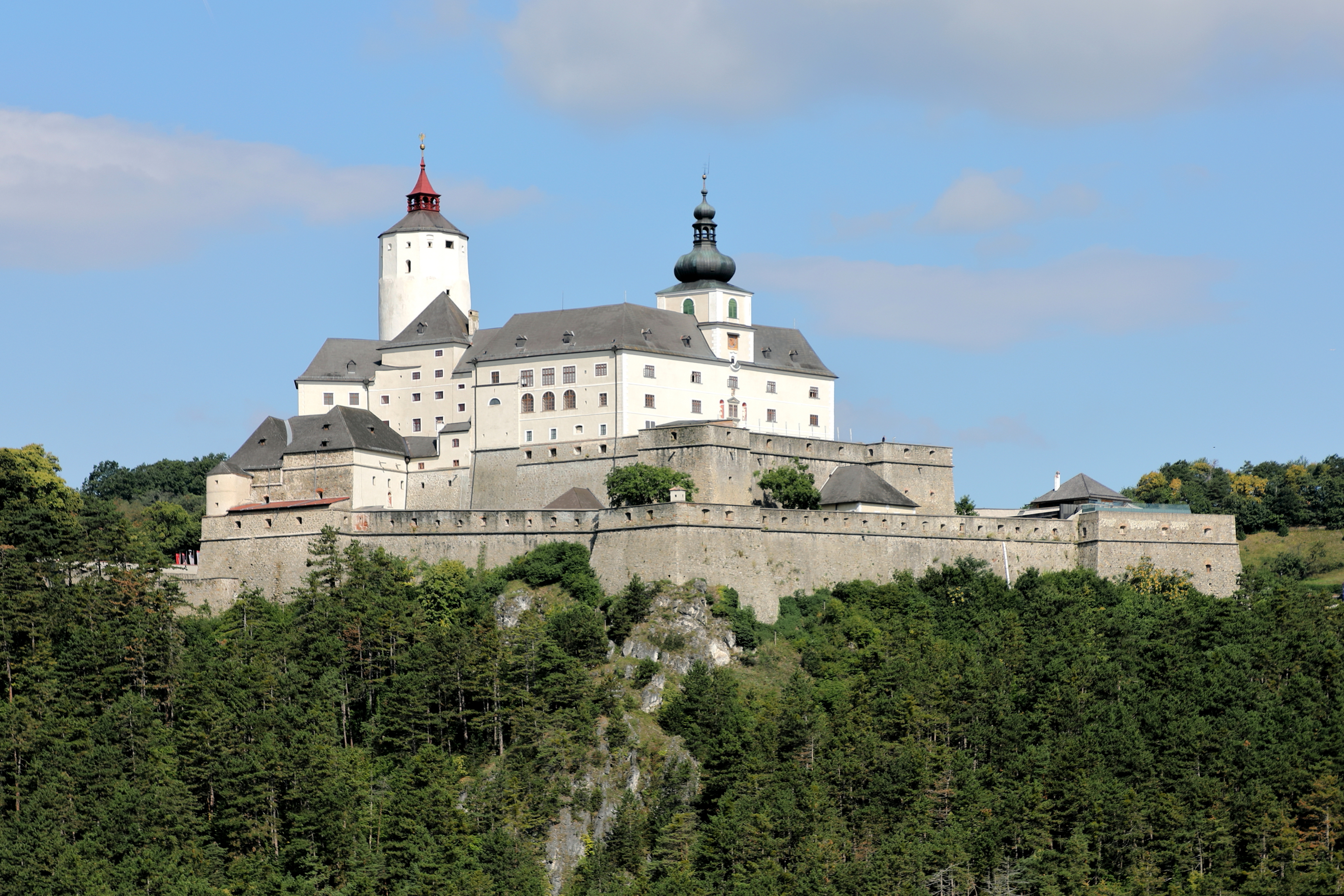
- Overall view of Forchtenstein Castle

Site information
- Type: Castle
- Owner: House of Esterházy
- Open to the public: yes
- Condition: major parts conserved

Location
- Coordinates: 47°42′34″N 16°19′51″E

Site history
- Built: beginning 15th century
- Built by: Lords of Mattersdorf

Forchtenstein Castle (German: Burg Forchtenstein; Hungarian: Fraknó vára; Croatian: Fortnavski grad) is a castle built in the Late Middle Ages near the municipality of Forchtenstein in northern Burgenland, Austria. Forchtenstein Castle is 511 metres (1,677 ft) above sea level.

== Location ==
The castle is south of Mattersburg above the Wulka valley.

== History ==
The first part of the castle with its 50-metre (160 ft) high keep was built in the beginning of the 15th century by the Lords of Mattersburg, who later named themselves Lords of Forchtenstein.

The castle features a tower, known as the 'Black Tower' although the black rock that originally lined the tower has since been stripped. The tower contains a 12-metre (40 ft) deep pit used as a prison cell for those condemned to death. Rezallia, wife of Lettus of Forchtenstein used this with great frequency; on the return of her husband from military service, she was herself sentenced to death in the tower by her husband.

Around 1450 the Lords of Forchtenstein died off due to lack of a male heir and the castle was passed over to the House of Habsburg, which owned it for 170 years. They leased it to others, including the Counts of Weissbriach and Hardegg. During this time the building was not changed significantly.

In 1622 Nikolaus Esterházy, founder of the western Hungarian Esterházy line, received the castle from Emperor Ferdinand II, and Esterházy became a Count. Nikolaus started to fortify the crumbling castle and refurbished it with the services of Vienna builder Simon Retacco from 1630 to 1634 and with Domenico Carlone from 1643. The construction workers were all from Italy. This led to big orders for three masters of Kaisersteinbruch, the imperial quarry: Ambrosius Petruzzy, Pietro Maino Maderno, and Mathias Lorentisch. Kaiserstein stone was used for the main portals, fountains, cannonballs, etc. Once hewn the stone was delivered on large wagons drawn by six oxen.

In the second half of the 17th century his son Paul further extended and ornamented the castle with architect Domenico Carlone. After Paul's death the castle's function changed. It became a repository for weapons, archives, chronometers, machines, exotic animal preparations and other "marvels". The only access to the treasure vault was a secret passage leading to a door requiring two different keys used together. One key was kept by the Count and the other by his treasurer. In the second half of the 18th century the castle was extended by master builder Ferdinand Mödlhammer. During this work the roof truss was lifted and the interior was renovated.

The treasure vault remained undiscovered and intact throughout World War II. The original glass-paned cabinets containing the collection are works of art in themselves.

The castle is still owned by the Esterházy family and, together with Schloss Esterházy in Eisenstadt, it chronicles the history and treasures of this ancient aristocratic family.

When Austria and Hungary separated in 1921, the Esterházy family's lands were split between the two countries. Their financial records remained at Castle Forchtenstein and the family records were taken to the Hungarian Federal Archive in Budapest.

== Gallery ==
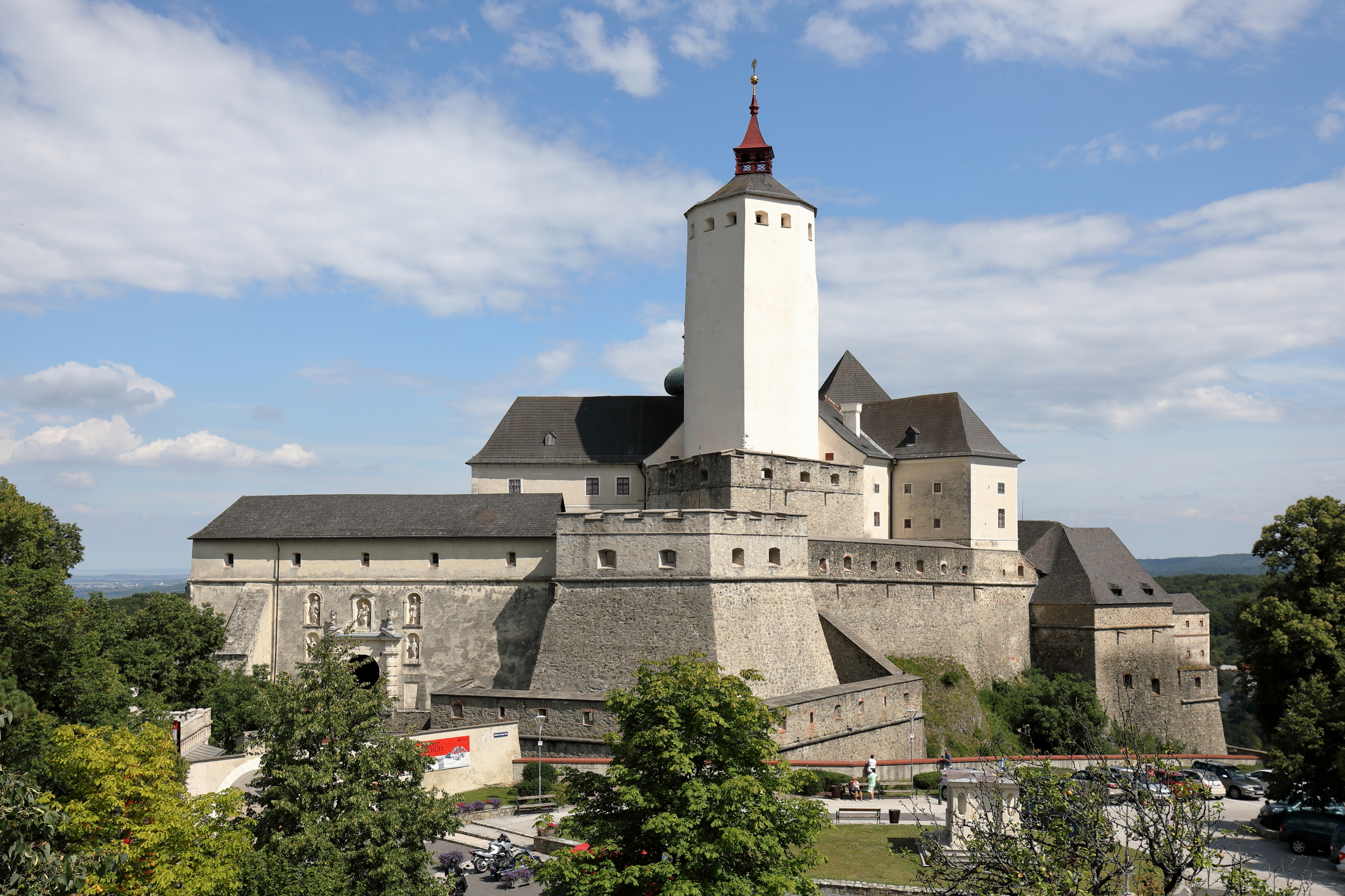
West view

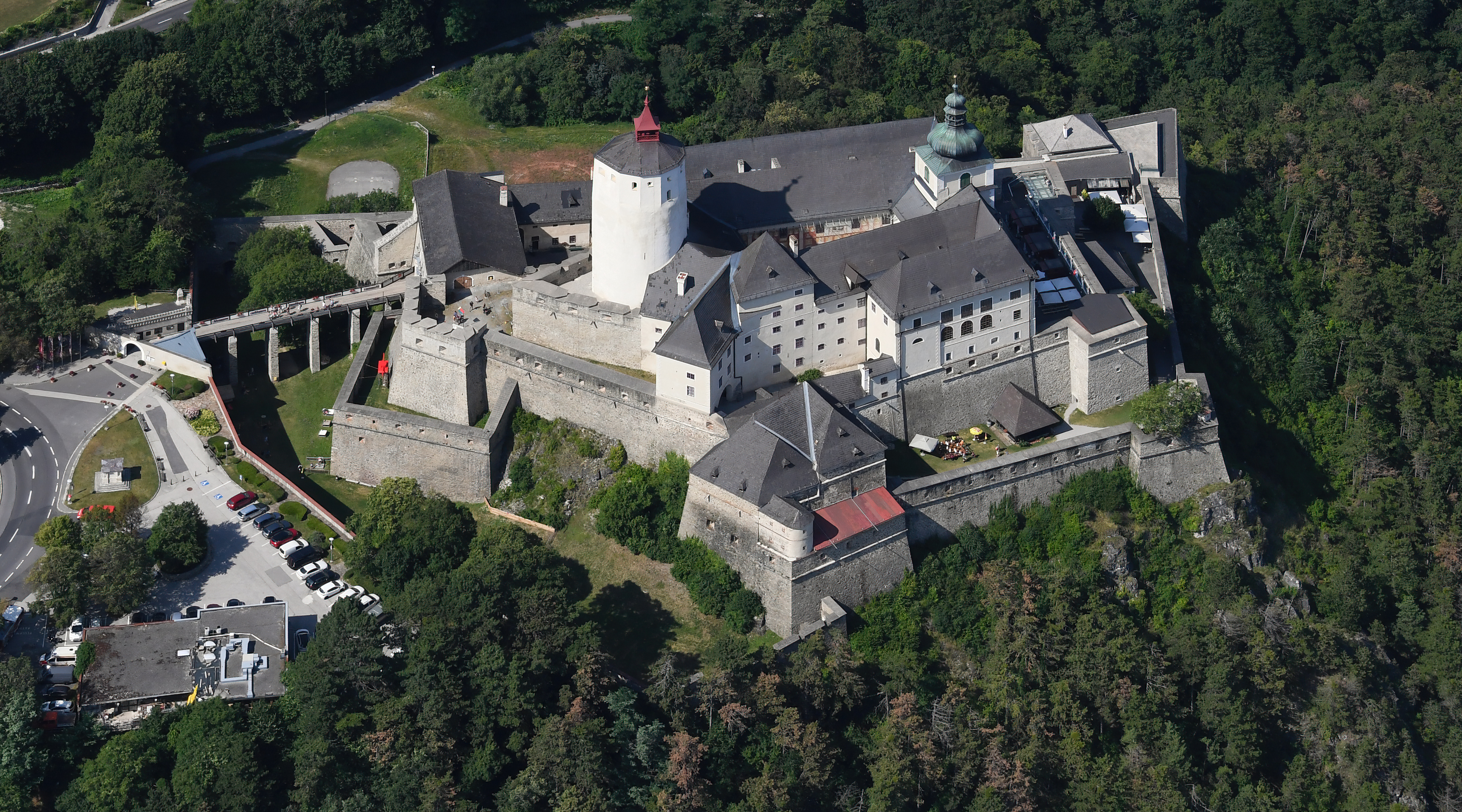
Aerial view

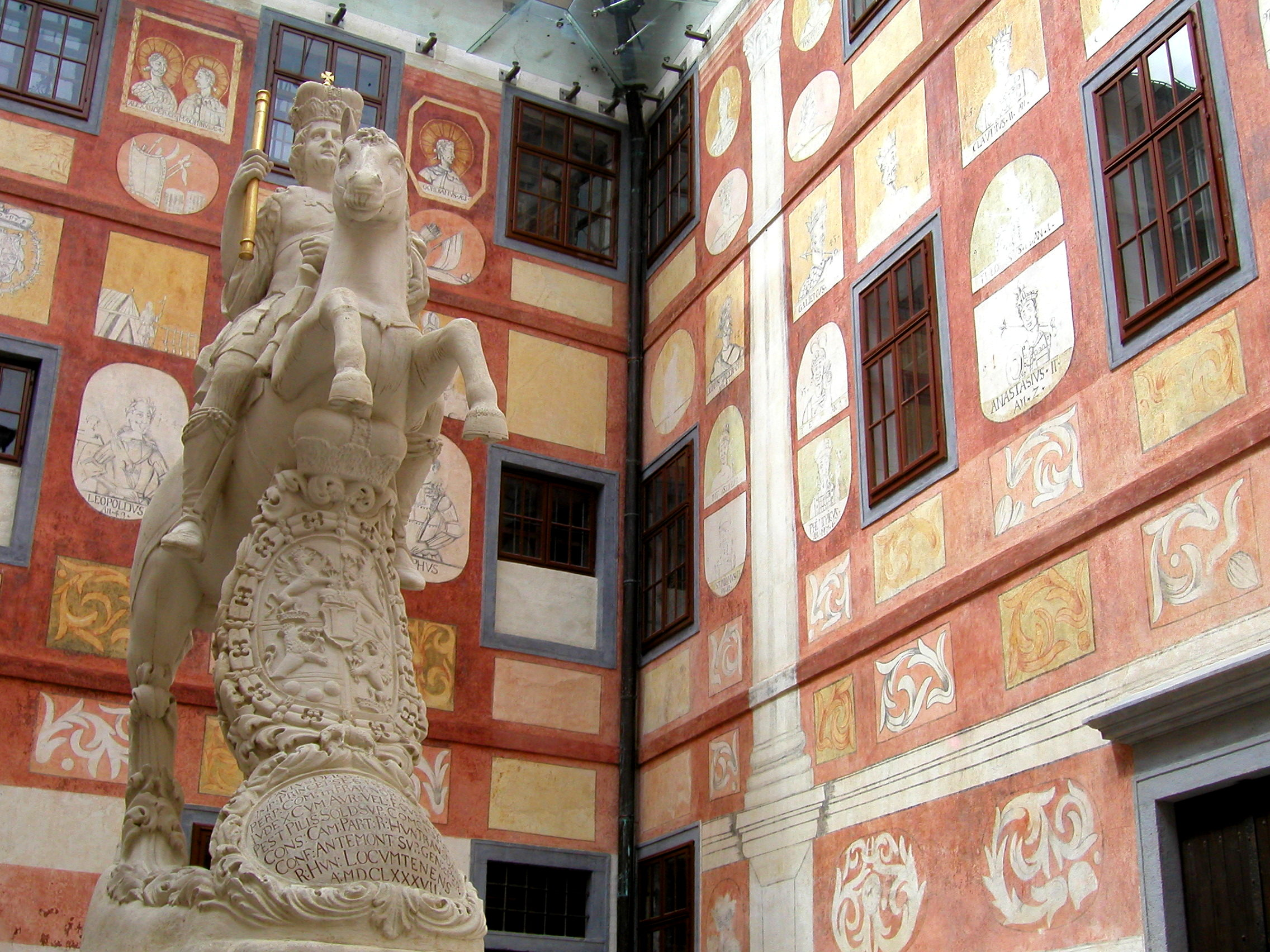
Courtyard with frescoes

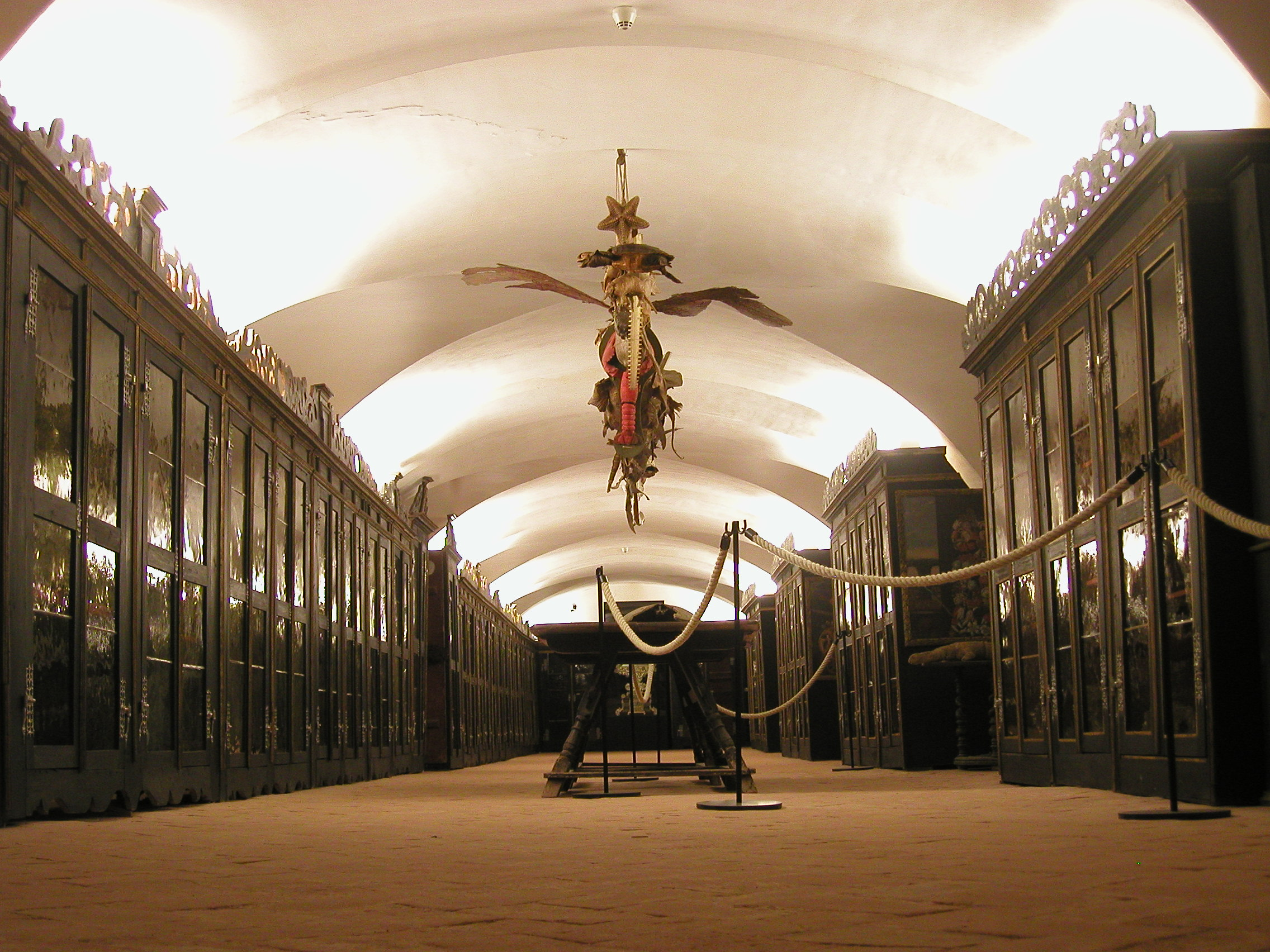
Treasure and Wunderkammer

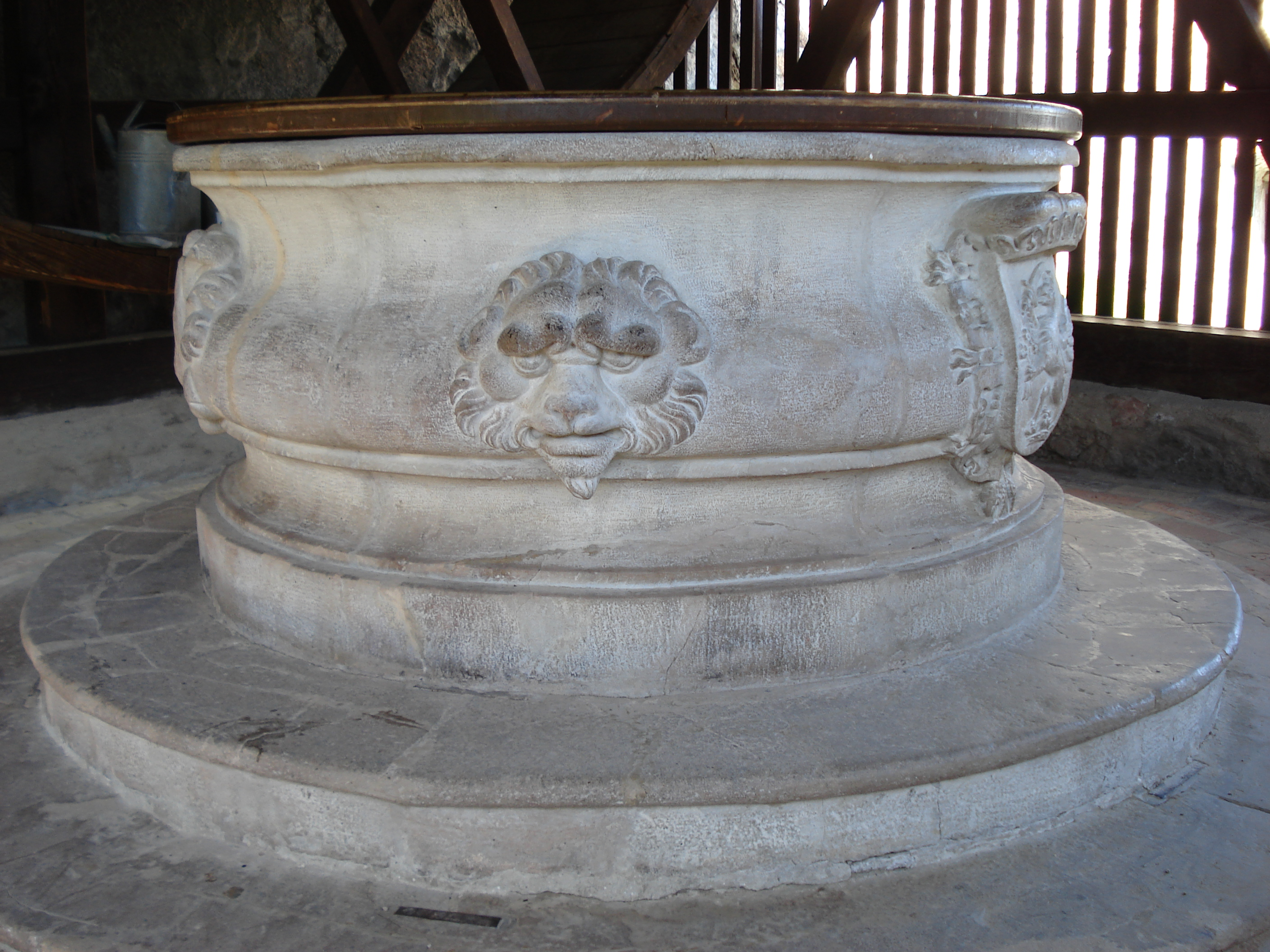
Fountain, hard Kaiserstein

== See also ==
- List of castles in Austria
