= Elazar Fleckeles =

18th-century European Rabbi

Rabbi Elazar Fleckeles
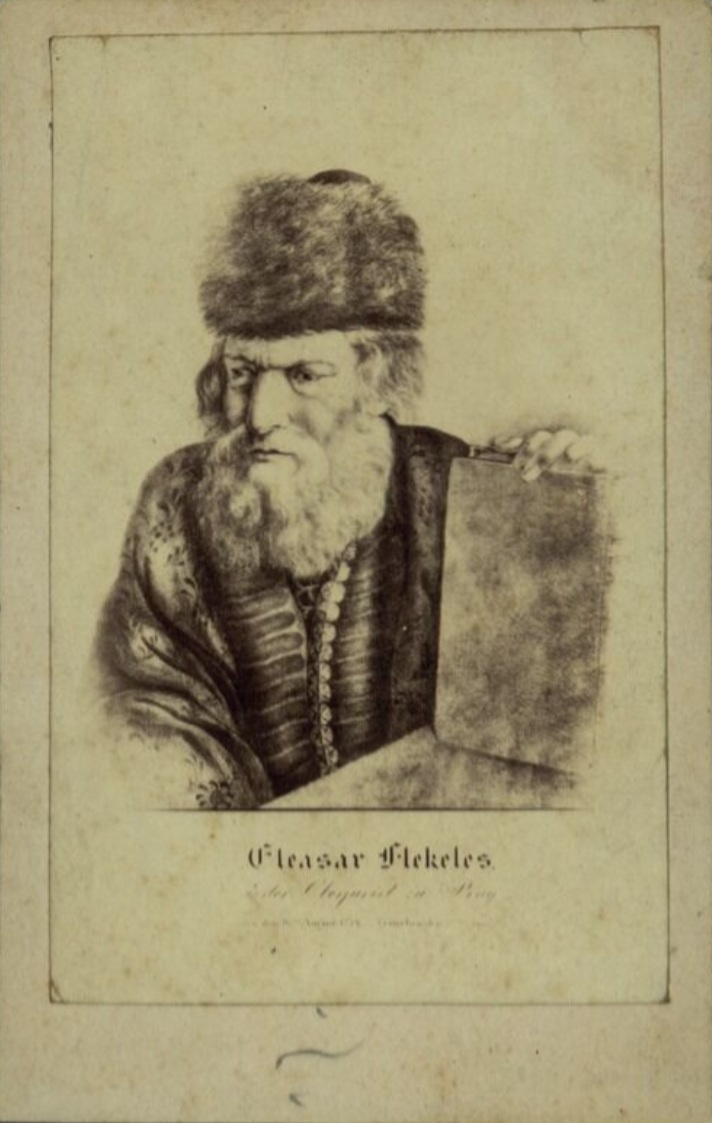

Personal life
- Born: 26 August 1754 Prague, Bohemia, Holy Roman Empire
- Died: 27 April 1826 (aged 71) Prague, Bohemia, Holy Roman Empire

Religious life
- Religion: Judaism

Elazar Fleckeles (August 26, 1754 – April 27, 1826) was a prominent Bohemian rabbi, author, and halakhic authority who served as the presiding judge of the rabbinical court in Prague. A leading disciple of Rabbi Yechezkel Landau (the Noda Bi-Yehudah), Fleckeles was a central figure in 18th- and early 19th-century European Jewish life, known for his prolific responsa, his spellbinding oratory, and his vigorous defense of rabbinic tradition against the internal threats of Sabbatianism and Frankism.

== Biography ==
Elazar Fleckeles was born in Prague on August 26, 1754 (8 Elul 5514), into a wealthy and prestigious patrician family. His father, David Fleckeles, was an elder of the Prague Jewish community, and his mother was a descendant of Rabbi Shlomo Ephraim Luntschitz, author of the Keli Yakar. His ancestry also included the famed astronomer David Gans.

Fleckeles received his early education in local yeshivas under Mosheh Kohen Rofe and Meïr Fischels. At age 14, he began a decade-long period of advanced study under Rabbi Yechezkel Landau, becoming Landau's favorite and most prominent student. This mentorship profoundly shaped his approach to Jewish law and communal leadership.

In 1779, at the age of twenty-four, Fleckeles was appointed rabbi of Kojetein (Gojtein) in Moravia. During his four-year tenure there, he developed his skills as a preacher, emphasizing social equality between rich and poor members of the community.

He returned to Prague in 1783 to serve as a dayan (rabbinic judge) under his mentor, Landau, and as the head of a large yeshiva. After Landau’s death in 1793, the office of chief rabbi remained vacant for decades; consequently, the community was led by a board of Oberjuristen (Chief Jurists). In 1801, Fleckeles was appointed erster Oberjurist (President of the Rabbinate), the highest religious office in Prague, a position he held until his death. He also served as the rabbi of the Beth Midrash founded by Joachim von Popper and Israel Fränkel.

== Intellectual and Religious Positions ==
Fleckeles was renowned for his scholarship and oratorical gifts, and for his skill in worldly affairs. He twice had audience with Emperor Francis I, and maintained a close friendship with the Christian censor Karl Fischer, with whom he corresponded in Hebrew on matters of Jewish law and customs, even printing a teshuva to Fisher in his responsa.

Fleckeles was a fierce opponent of the lingering Sabbatian and Frankist movements in Bohemia. In 1799, he launched a major campaign against Frankist remnants in Prague, particularly the influential Wehle family. His public sermons denouncing these sects led to civil disturbances and riots, resulting in Fleckeles’ brief imprisonment by the Habsburg authorities in 1800. He chronicled his opposition in the polemical work Ahavat David.

In a fashion similar to that of his mentor Landau, Fleckeles viewed the threat that Sabbatianism posed to tradition, in particular to the centrality of Talmud and its study, as emanating from excesses of mysticism and the public pursuit of Kabbalah by the unlearned. Hence even legitimate Kabbalah and its derived practices, such as prefacing mystical intentional formulae to the recitation of blessings, should, he believed, play no public role. Rather, as in days of yore, such practices should become esoteric observances restricted to a learned elite and remain secondary to Talmudic study. Fleckeles states unequivocally that if one would claim to be the Messiah because of his broad knowledge of the Kabbalah, he would not be believed if his knowledge of the Talmud was deficient.

While maintaining deep respect for the tanna Shimon bar Yochai, Fleckeles followed his predecessor Jacob Emden in questioning the antiquity of the Zohar. He argued that the work contained numerous forgeries and noted that it was never mentioned in the Talmud or by early Geonim and Rishonim.

Fleckeles was a staunch defender of Orthodoxy during the early years of the Enlightenment (Haskalah). He joined colleagues in condemning the Hamburg Temple reforms. He criticized Moses Mendelssohn’s German translation of the Pentateuch, fearing it would lead to the neglect of Torah study in favor of secular sciences. However, he was not entirely opposed to secular learning.

In the introduction to his responsa, titled Kesut Enayim ("A Covering of the Eyes"), Fleckeles articulated a universalist ethical framework. He argued that contemporary gentiles who observe the Noahide laws are considered "righteous among the nations" and possess a portion in the World to Come. He emphasized that Talmudic derogatory statements referred only to ancient pagans, not to modern Christians, and he insisted on the absolute obligation for Jews to treat non-Jews with honesty, charity, and respect.

== Works ==
Fleckeles was a prolific author whose works remain cornerstones of 19th-century Ashkenazic scholarship. Among his works are:

- Teshuvah me-Ahavah - A three-volume responsa collection containing 450 rulings organized according to the Shulchan Arukh. The title is a gematria for his name, Elazar.
- Olat Chodesh - A four-part collection of sermons covering halakhic and aggadic themes, published between 1785 and 1800.
- Ahavat David - The fourth volume of Olat Chodesh, primarily a polemic against Sabbatianism and Frankism
- A funeral sermon on the occasion of the death of Joachim Edler von Popper, (1795)
- Ma'aseh be-Rabbi Elazar - A widely studied commentary on the Passover Haggadah.
- Melekhet ha-Kodesh, two funeral sermons and a guide for scribes on the holy names of God which occur in the Scriptures.
- Nefesh David veNefesh Chayyah, on the death of his parents, ib. 1812.
- Mevasser Tov, two sermons delivered on the occasion of the victory of the Austrian army at Naples in 1821 (1821)
- Chazon la-Mo'ed, a series of sermons for the month of Tishri (1824)
- Milli de-Avos, a commentary on Pirkei Avos
- Mille de-Oraisa, sermons

== Death and Legacy ==
Rabbi Elazar Fleckeles died in Prague on April 27, 1826 (20 Nisan 5586), during the holiday of Passover. He was buried in the Žižkov cemetery in Prague, near his mentor Yechezkel Landau.

His legacy lived on through his influential students and his family. His son-in-law, Isaac Spitz, was the rabbi of Bumsla, and his grandson, Yom-Tob Spitz, published an early biography of him titled Zikhron Elazar. His grandson Moritz Hartmann became a celebrated German poet and radical politician. Fleckeles' methodical approach to responsa literature influenced subsequent generations of rabbis in Bohemia and beyond. In recent years, his works have seen a revival through reprinting projects and digital preservation.
