= Heuberg (Rosalia Mountains) =

Mountain in Austria

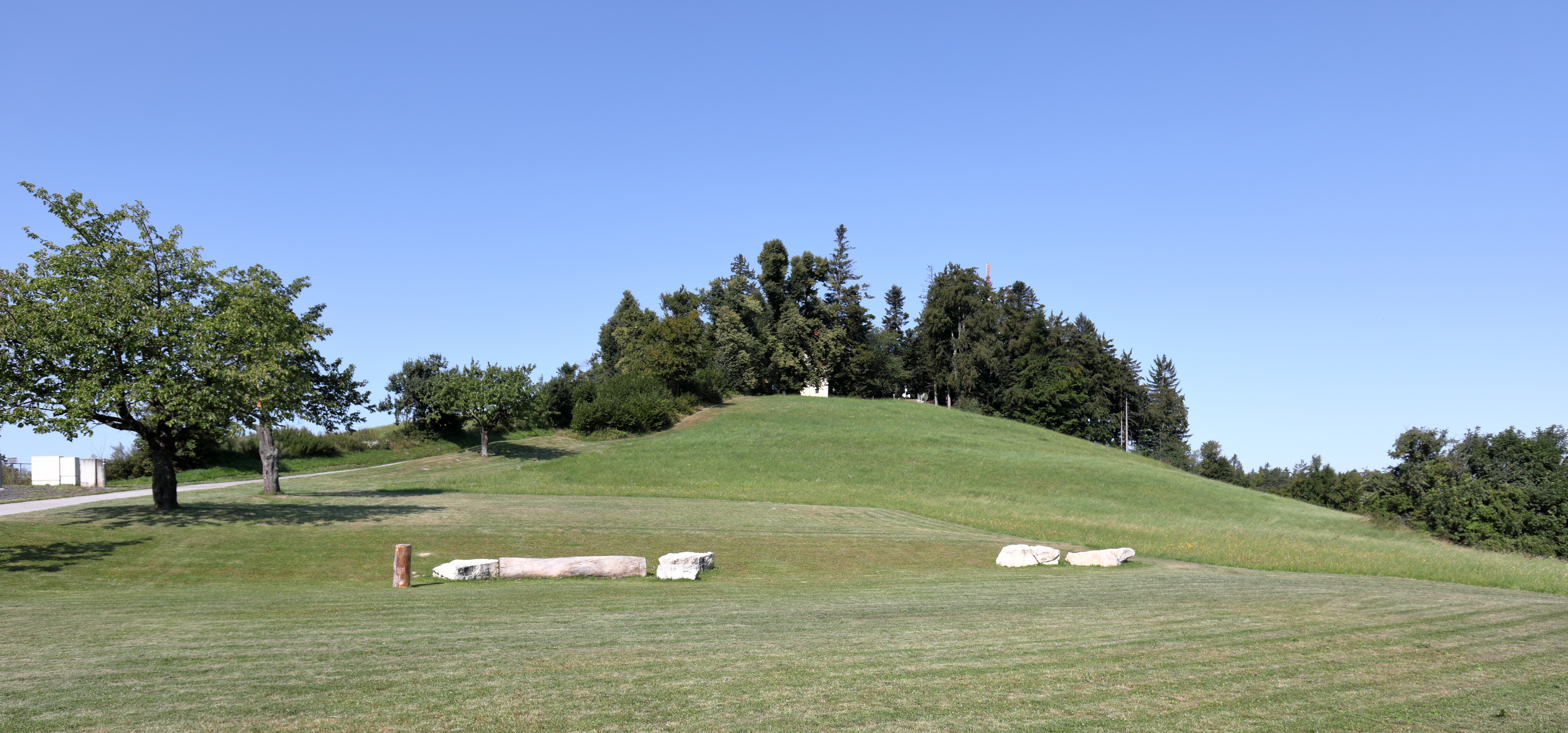
- Summit of the Heuberg

Highest point
- Elevation: 748 m (AA) (2,454 ft)
- Prominence: 154 metres (505 ft) ↓ Steghöfe
- Isolation: 9.52 kilometres (5.92 mi) → Mäuserriegel
- Coordinates: 47°41′51″N 16°18′24″E

Geography
- Location within Austria Location within Burgenland
- Location: Burgenland
- Parent range: Rosalia Mountains

The Heuberg, also called Rosalia, is 748 m (AA) (2,454 ft), and thus the highest peak in the Rosalia Mountains.

== Geography ==
=== Location ===
The Heuberg lies on the territory of Forchtenstein in the Austrian state of Burgenland, northeast of the Hochwolkersdorf hamlet of Hollerberg and northwest of the village of Rosalienhäuser in the Forchtenstein cadastral municipality of Neustift an der Rosalia. The border with Lower Austria runs past the summit only about 150 metres (490 ft) to the west and south. To the northwest is the village of Heuberg in the cadastral municipality of Ofenbach in the municipality of Lanzenkirchen, where there is a forestry training centre for the University of Natural Resources and Life Sciences, Vienna. The Heuberg's neighbouring summits are the Auerberg (740 metres [2,430 ft]) and the Hartlspitz (700 metres [2,300 ft]) to the south. The Wulka rises on the northeastern mountainside of the Heuberg.

=== Geology ===
Geologically, the Heuberg is made of coarse gneiss. Its slopes are dominated by agricultural fields, but the summit area is wooded.

== Sport ==
On its southern slopes below the Rosalia Chapel is a ski and toboggan slope. In the winter, when the snow is good enough there is a roughly 150-metre-long (490 ft) drag lift, which is mainly used by parents with their children.

== Structures ==
At the top is the Rosalia Chapel, a well-known pilgrimage church. A road runs to it from the settlement of Rosalienhäuser. On the northern side of the Heuberg is the Heuberg Transmitter.

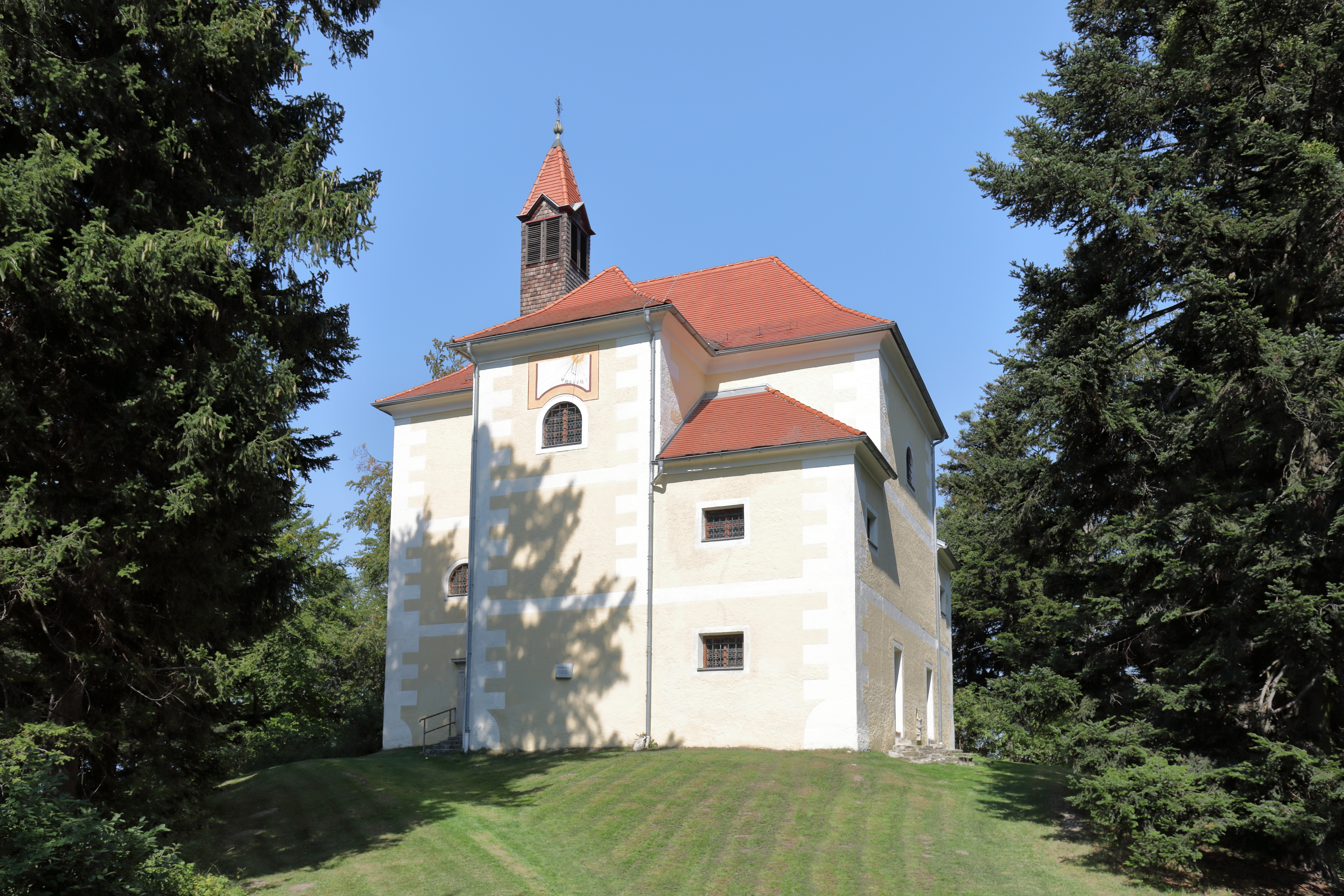
The Rosalia Chapel

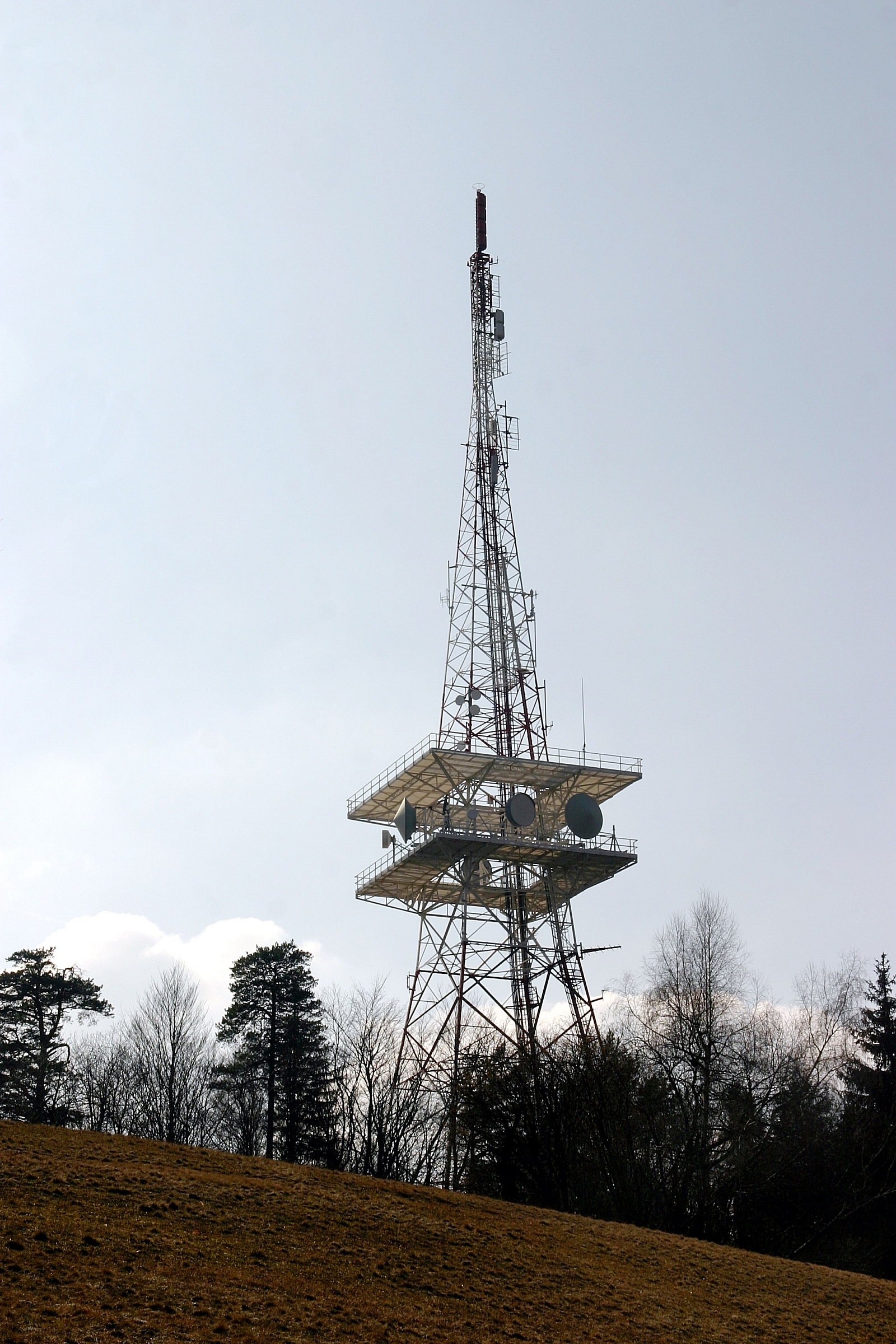
The Heuberg Transmitter near the summit
