= Heuberg =

Heuberg may refer to:

Places

- in Germany:
  - Heuberg/Buchhorn/Gleichen, village in the municipality of Pfedelbach, Hohenlohekreis, Baden-Württemberg
  - Heuberg (Buchenbach), village in the municipality of Buchenbach, Breisgau-Hochschwarzwald, Baden-Württemberg
  - Heuberg (Herrieden), village in the borough of Herrieden, Ansbach, Bavaria
  - Heuberg (Hilpoltstein), village in the borough of Hilpoltstein, Roth, Bavaria
  - Heuberg (Oettingen), village in the borough of Oettingen, Donau-Ries, Bavaria
  - Heuberg (Waltenhofen), village in the municipality of Waltenhofen, Oberallgäu, Bavaria
  - Heuberg (Weißenburg), village in the municipality of Weißenburg-Gunzenhausen, Bavaria
  - Heuberg (Westerheim), village in the municipality of Westerheim, Alb-Donau-Kreis, Baden-Württemberg
- in Austria:
  - Heuberg, cadastral municipality of Koppl, Salzburg-Umgebung, Salzburg
  - Heuberg (Lanzenkirchen), hamlet in Lanzenkirchen, Wiener Neustadt-Land, Lower Austria
  - Heuberg (Lassing), village in Lassing, Liezen, Styria
  - Heuberg (Lend), village in Lend, Zell am See, Salzburg Land
  - Heuberg (Oberaich), village in Oberaich, Bruck-Mürzzuschlag, Styria
  - Heuberg (Pyhra), cadastral municipality of Pyhra, Sankt Pölten-Land, Lower Austria
  - Heuberg (Scheffau), village in Scheffau am Tennengebirge, Hallein, Salzburger state of
  - Heuberg (Scheibbs), village in Scheibbs, Scheibbs, Lower Austria
  - Heuberg (Serfaus), village near Serfaus, Landeck, Tyrol
  - Heuberg (Stans), village in Stans, district of Schwaz, Tyrol

Structures

- Schloss Heuberg, castle in the municipality of Bruck an der Großglocknerstraße, Zell am See, Salzburg, Austria
- Lager Heuberg, part of the Bundeswehr's military base in the region around the Großer Heuberg, near Stetten am kalten Markt, Sigmaringen, Baden-Württemberg, Germany
- Heuberg Transmitter, on the Heuberg, near Forchtenstein, Mattersburg, Burgenland, Austria

Mountain regions, mountains and hills

- in Germany:
  - Heuberg (Chiemgau Alps) (1337.6 m), in the Chiemgau Alps near Nußdorf am Inn, Rosenheim, Bavaria
  - Großer Heuberg (up to 1015 m), region of the Swabian Jura in Zollernalbkreis, Sigmaringen and Tuttlingen, Baden-Württemberg
  - Heuberg (Black Forest) (709.1 m), in the Black Forest near Neuenbürg, Enzkreis, Baden-Württemberg
  - Kleiner Heuberg (c. 700 m), region of the Swabian Jura in Zollernalbkreis and Rottweil, Baden-Württemberg
  - Heuberg (Tübingen) (497.9 m), near Waldhausen (Tübingen), Tübingen, Baden-Württemberg
  - Heuberg (Rottenburg am Neckar) (483.5 m), near Rottenburg am Neckar, Tübingen, Baden-Württemberg – with the Heuberger Warte
  - Heuberg (Welzheim Forest) (476.6 m), in the Welzheim Forest southwest of Walkersbach (Plüderhausen), Rems-Murr-Kreis, Baden-Württemberg
  - Heuberg (Hofgeismar Municipal Forest) (392 m), in the Hofgeismar Municipal Forest near Hofgeismar, Kassel, Hesse – with a radio and TV tower
  - Heuberg (Spessart) (365 m), in the Spessart near Frammersbach, Main-Spessart, Bavaria; see Frammersbach#Hills
  - Heuberg (Kiffing) (344 m), in the Kiffing near Oedelsheim (Oberweser), Kassel, Hesse – with transmission tower
- in Austria:
  - Heuberg (Allgäu Alps) (1795 m), in the Kleinwalsertal, Vorarlberg
  - Heuberg (Brandenberg Alps) (1746 m), in the Brandenberg Alps, Tyrol
  - Heuberg (Salzburg) (901 m), hill country and landscape area east of the Salzburg suburb of Gnigl, Salzburg, Salzburg state
  - Heuberg (Rosalia Mountains) (748 m), in the Rosalia Mountains near Forchtenstein, Mattersburg, Burgenland – with the Heuberg Transmitter
  - Heuberg (Hallein) (556 m), in the Salzach valley near Hallein, Hallein, Salzburg state
  - Heuberg (Vienna Woods), in the market municipality of St. Andrä-Wördern, Tulln, Lower Austria
  - Heuberg (Vienna) (464 m), in the 17th Vienna district of Hernals

Other

- Heuberg (nature reserve), a nature reserve in Zollernalbkreis, Baden-Württemberg

== See also ==
- Hoiberg
- Hooiberg
