= Rosalia Mountains =

Mountain range in Austria

Rosaliengebirge
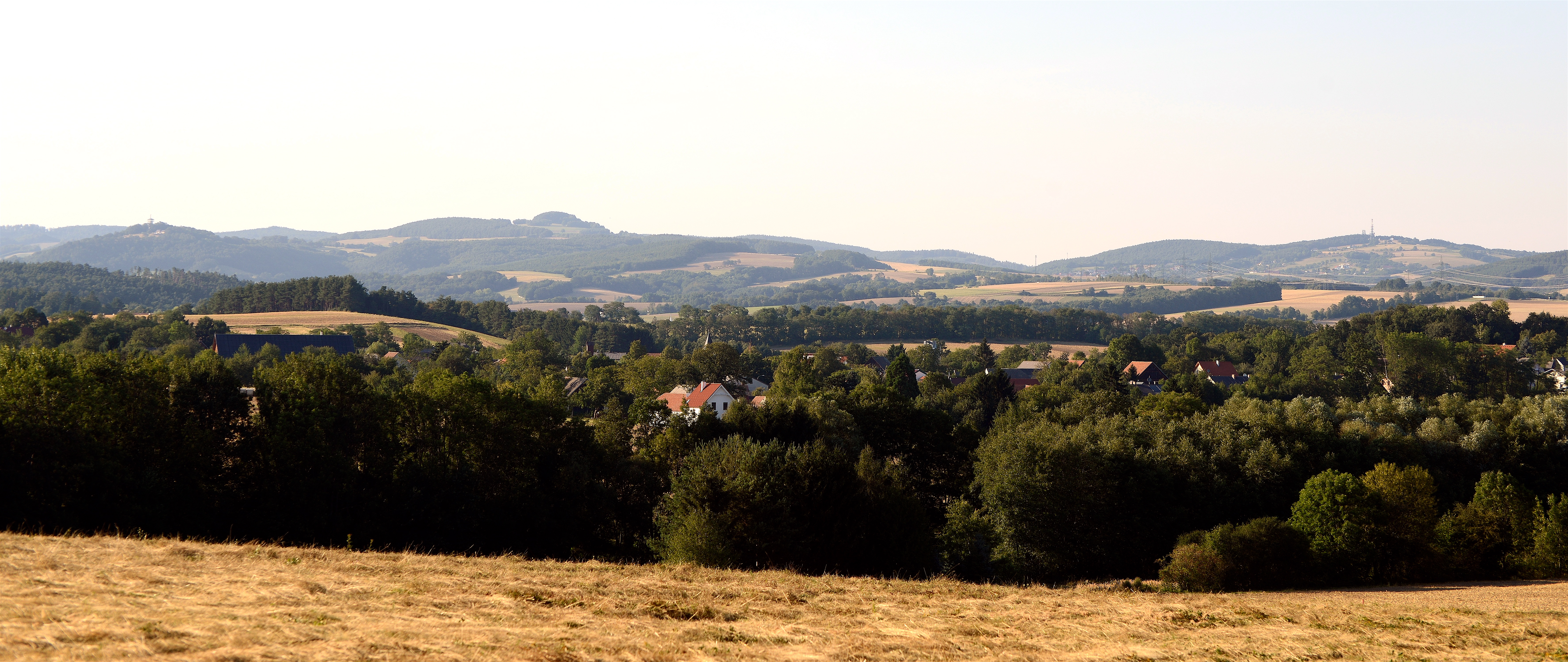
- The Rosalia Mountains (with views of the Burgberg seen from Schwarzenbach and the most prominent summit of the Sieggrabener Kogel) extending in the east to the Sieggraben Saddle

Highest point
- Peak: Heuberg (Rosalia Chapel)
- Elevation: 748 m above sea level (AA)

Dimensions
- Length: 35 km (22 mi)

Geography
- Location within Austria
- State(s): Lower Austrian / Burgenland border, Austria
- Range coordinates: 47°41′50″N 16°18′26″E
- Parent range: Prealps East of the Mur, Alps

Geology
- Rock type(s): gneiss, schist; overlain by limestone

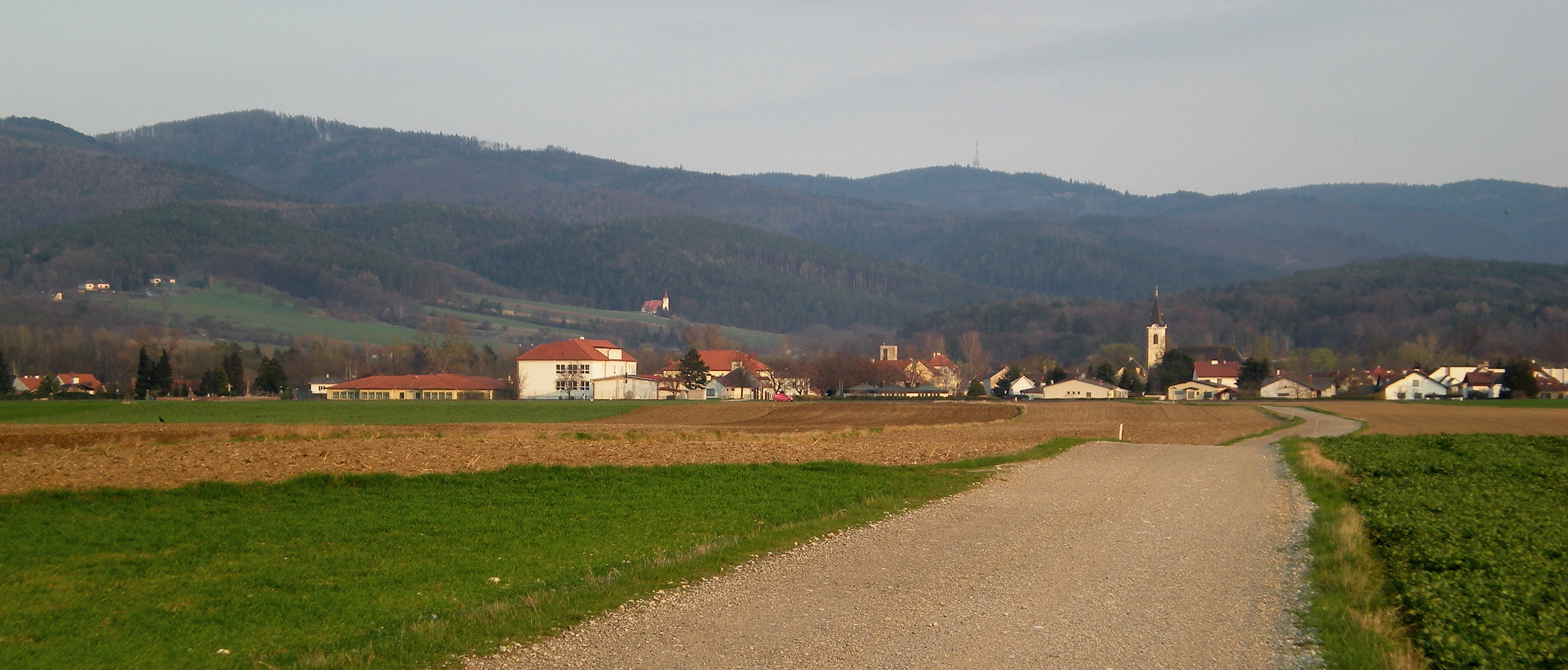
Lanzenkirchen with the Rosalia Mountains in the background

The Rosalia Mountains (German: Rosaliengebirge, Hungarian: Rozália-hegység, Burgenland Croatian: Gorje Rozalija), sometimes called the Rosalie Mountains or Rosalien Mountains, are an outlier of the Alps on the state border between Lower Austria and Burgenland in Austria. The low mountain range runs from north to south and reaches its highest point at the summit of the Heuberg (often also called Rosalia) near Neudörfl, before descending again towards the village of Weppersdorf. They are separated from the Leitha Mountains to the north by the Ödenburg Gate.

From a geological perspective the Rosalia Mountains are part of the Bucklige Welt. The topographical boundary between the Bucklige Welt and the Rosalia is formed by the valley of the Klingfurther Bach, which runs from north to southeast and in which lie the villages of Klingfurth and Rosenbrunn. The boundary continues over the basin of the Hochwolkersdorf hamlet of Alm, along the so-called Totengraben in the Essengraben and then via the Graben into the valley of the Schwarzenbach.

In the east the range is adjoined by the Ödenburg or Sopron Mountains. The north–south boundary between them is formed by the Marzau, the Sieggraben Saddle and the Sieggrabenbach valley.

The following peaks are located in the northern Rosalia:

- Scheiben
- Mitterriegel
- Gespitzter Riegel
- Bergkogel
- Bauernmaiß
- Kogel
- Krieriegel

The northern and southern Rosalia Mountains are separated from one another by the Wulka valley, the Heuberg (highest point of the range near the Rosalia Chapel) and a ridge that runs from the Heuberg via the Auerberg and the Hochwolkersdorf hamlet of Hollerberg to Fernblick.

The following peaks are located in the southern Rosalia:

- Auerberg
- Hartlspitz
- Geißspitz
- Schwarzkogel
- Greimkogel
- Reisnerkogel
- Marriegel
- Sieggrabener Kogel
- Königsbühel
- Schwarzenbach Burgberg
- Roter Riegel

Like the Leitha Mountains, the Rosalia Mountains are made of gneiss, schist and limestone. The ridge is heavily forested. The highest point is the Heuberg with its Rosalia Chapel, which reaches a height of 748 metres. At the top is the ORF transmitter of Heuberg which covers northern Burgenland. On the steep limestone crags at its eastern foot is Forchtenstein Castle. The range is drained by the Wulka, the Leitha and the Schwarzenbach. Part of the range is located within the Rosalia-Kogelberg Nature Park.

The Rosalia Mountains can only be crossed by the road from Mattersburg in Burgenland to Hochwolkersdorf in Lower Austria. In its lateral valleys, favourable conditions have led to extensive orchards and vineyards. A well-known village is the spa of Bad Sauerbrunn at their northern foot.

== Literature ==
- Franz K. Bauer, Rudolph Oberhauser (eds.): Der Geologische Aufbau Österreichs. Geologische Bundesanstalt, Springer-Verlag, Vienna/New York, 2008, ISBN 3-211-81556-2, pp. 326ff.
