= Auerberg (Rosalia Mountains) =

Mountain in Austria

- Location within Austria

Highest point
- Elevation: 720 m (AA) (2,360 ft)
- Prominence: 35 m ↓ L223
- Isolation: 0.89 km → Heuberg
- Coordinates: 47°41′19″N 16°18′15″E

Geography
- Location: Lower Austria
- Parent range: Rosalia Mountains

The Auerberg is a mountain about 720 m (AA) in the Rosalia Mountains in Lower Austria.

It lies northeast of the Hochwolkersdorf hamlet of Hollerberg and southwest of the Forchtenstein hamlet of Rosalienhäuser. Only about 200 metres east of the summit is the border with Burgenland, where there is a 699-metre-high saddle across which the federal road from Hochwolkersdorf to Forchtenstein runs. To the northeast on the terrain of Forchtenstein is the head of the Heidbach valley and to the north, south and east rise the headstreams of the Ofenbach. Neighbouring mountains are the Heuberg (748 m) to the north and the Hartlspitz (700 m) with its legendary Am Markstein to the east.
