= Kallir =

Kallir is a surname. Notable people with this surname include:

- Eleazar ben Kalir (c. 570–c. 640), Byzantine Jew and a Hebrew poet
- Eleazar ben Eleazar Kallir (1728–1805), Hungarian rabbi
- Jane Kallir, American art dealer, curator and author
- Lilian Kallir, Czech-born American pianist
- Otto Kallir, Austrian American art historian, author, publisher
