= Spitz (surname) =

Spitz is a German surname. Notable people with the surname include:

- Andrés Ojeda Spitz (born 1984), Uruguayan lawyer and politician
- Armand Spitz (1904–1971), American planetarium designer
- Bob Spitz, American journalist and author
- Carl Spitz (1894–1976), Hollywood dog trainer
- Chantal Spitz (born 1954), French Polynesian writer
- Dan Spitz (born 1963), American guitarist
- Dave Spitz (born 1955), American bassist
- Donald Spitz, American anti-abortion activist
- Elisa Spitz (born 1963), American figure skater
- Fannie S. Spitz (1873–1943), American inventor
- Gerald J. Spitz (1941–2013), American politician
- Hanneliese Spitz (born 1941), Austrian sprint canoeist
- Herman H. Spitz (1925–2019), American psychologist
- Illés Spitz (1902–1961), Hungarian football player and manager
- Isaac Spitz (1764–1842), Bohemian writer
- Jacques Spitz (1896–1963), French writer
- Jason Spitz (born 1982), American football player
- Leó Szilárd (1898–1964), born Leó Spitz, Hungarian scientist
- Lewis Spitz (born 1939), South African paediatric surgeon
- Malte Spitz (born 1984), German politician
- Marc Spitz (1969–2017), American writer and music journalist
- Mark Spitz (born 1950), American swimmer
- René Spitz (1887–1974), Austrian-American psychoanalyst
- Sabine Spitz (born 1971), German cross-country cyclist
- Sophie Spitz (1910–1956), American pathologist
- Tibor Spitz (born 1929), American artist and Holocaust survivor
- Vivien Spitz (1924–2014), American journalist
- Werner Spitz (1926–2024), German forensic pathologist
- Yom-Tob Spitz (1797–1874), Bohemian writer

== Fictional characters ==
- Adam Spitz, Sharon Spitz, Josh Spitz, and Helen Spitz, four characters in the television series Braceface
