= Mattersburg =

- Municipality
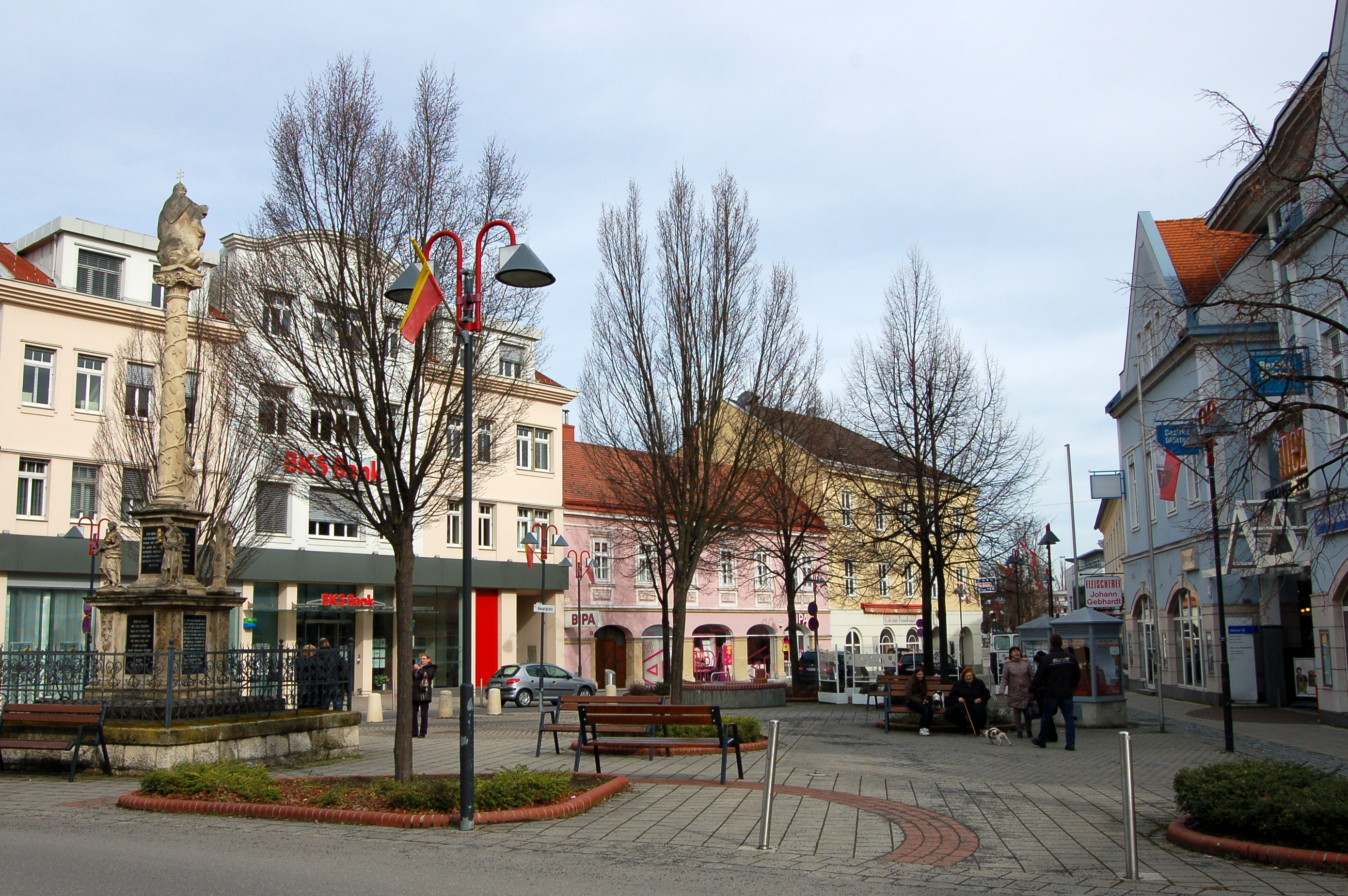
- Main square

- Flag Coat of arms

- Location within Austria Mattersburg (Austria)
- Coordinates: 47°44′17″N 16°23′49″E
- Country: Austria
- State: Burgenland
- District: Mattersburg

Government
  - Mayor: Claudia Schlager (SPÖ)

Area
  - Total: 28.2 km^{2} (10.9 sq mi)
- Elevation: 258 m (846 ft)

Population (2023-01-01)
  - Total: 7,514
  - Density: 266/km^{2} (690/sq mi)
- Time zone: UTC+1 (CET)
  - Summer (DST): UTC+2 (CEST)
- Postal code: 7210
- Area code: 0 26 26
- Vehicle registration: MA
- Website: www.mattersburg.gv.at

Mattersburg (German pronunciation: [ˈmatɐsˌbʊʁk]; formerly Mattersdorf, Hungarian: Nagymarton, Croatian: Matrštof) is a town in Burgenland, Austria. It is the administrative center of the District of Mattersburg and was home to former Bundesliga football team, SV Mattersburg.

== Location ==
Mattersburg lies in the northern part of Burgenland, east of Wiener Neustadt in the Wulka River Valley, in a rural region of the country.

Mattersburg is reachable by road using the Burgenland Highway S31 from Eisenstadt and Oberpullendorf or the Mattersburg Highway S4 from Wiener Neustadt.

Mattersburg is connected by rail with Wiener Neustadt and Sopron by the Mattersburg Railway.

Mattersburg's two boroughs are Mattersburg and Walbersdorf.

== History ==
The site of Mattersburg was already populated in antiquity based on excavations of Roman and Longobard graveyards. The town was first mentioned in writing as Villa Martini in 1202, when it was a property of the Nagymartoni family of Aragonese origin. Its Hungarian name (Nagymarton) also refers to the church consecrated to Martin of Tours. Originally the German name was Mattersdorf and it was renamed to Mattersburg in 1924. Matter originated from Martin and also refers to St. Martin of Tours, while Dorf means "village" and Burg means "castle".

The area's original fortress had already been torn down by 1294. Mattersburg was elevated to the status of a market town in 1354. The town was destroyed by fire in the year 1774 and again in 1856. The area's wealth increased when the railway began running from Wiener Neustadt to Mattersburg in 1847. During the 19th century, the town was the site of a ceramics factory founded by János Ziegler in 1815 or 1818, producing yellow coloured wares following the style of Vienna porcelain.

The town was one of the Burgenland Siebengemeinden. The first Jews to settle in the town arrived in the 16th century, having been expelled from Sopron, and their presence in the town increased greatly over the following years. In 1671, the Jews were forced to abandon the town by the order of Leopold I. They were allowed to return to Mattersdorf, as it was then called, in 1678, although they were forced to buy back their own possessions. The self-governing Jewish community was merged with the rest of the town in 1902/03.

As with the rest of Burgenland, Mattersburg belonged to the Kingdom of Hungary until 1920 and it was the seat of the Nagymarton district in Sopron county. In late 1918, Mattersburg locals rebelled against Hungarian rule to create the short-lived Republic of Heinzenland aimed at unifying with Austria. After the end of the First World War, German West-Hungary was given to Austria in the Treaties of St. Germain and Trianon; there it formed the new province of Burgenland. Mattersburg kept the official name of Mattersdorf until June 14, 1924; on July 2, 1926, it received town privileges. In 1978, Mattersburg incorporated the village of Walbersdorf.

After the Anschluss in February 1938, the Jewish population of Mattersburg was expelled and dispossessed, so that already in the autumn of 1938, there were no more Jews in Mattersburg. In the course of the war, more than two hundred of the town's residents were missing or killed. Approximately one hundred of its Jewish residents were murdered in the Holocaust.

== Politics ==
The Mayor of Mattersburg is Ingrid Salamon of the Social Democratic Party (SPÖ); there are two Vice-Mayors: the first is Klaus Leitgeb of the Austrian People's Party (ÖVP) and the second Josef Reisner of the SPÖ. The District Mayor of the Borough of Walbersdorf is Hubert Lang of the SPÖ and Johann Wallner is the Chief Officer.

Mattersburg's municipal council has 25 seats with party mandates as follows: 9 ÖVP, 14 SPÖ, 1 Freedom Party (FPÖ), 1 Grüne, other lists 0.

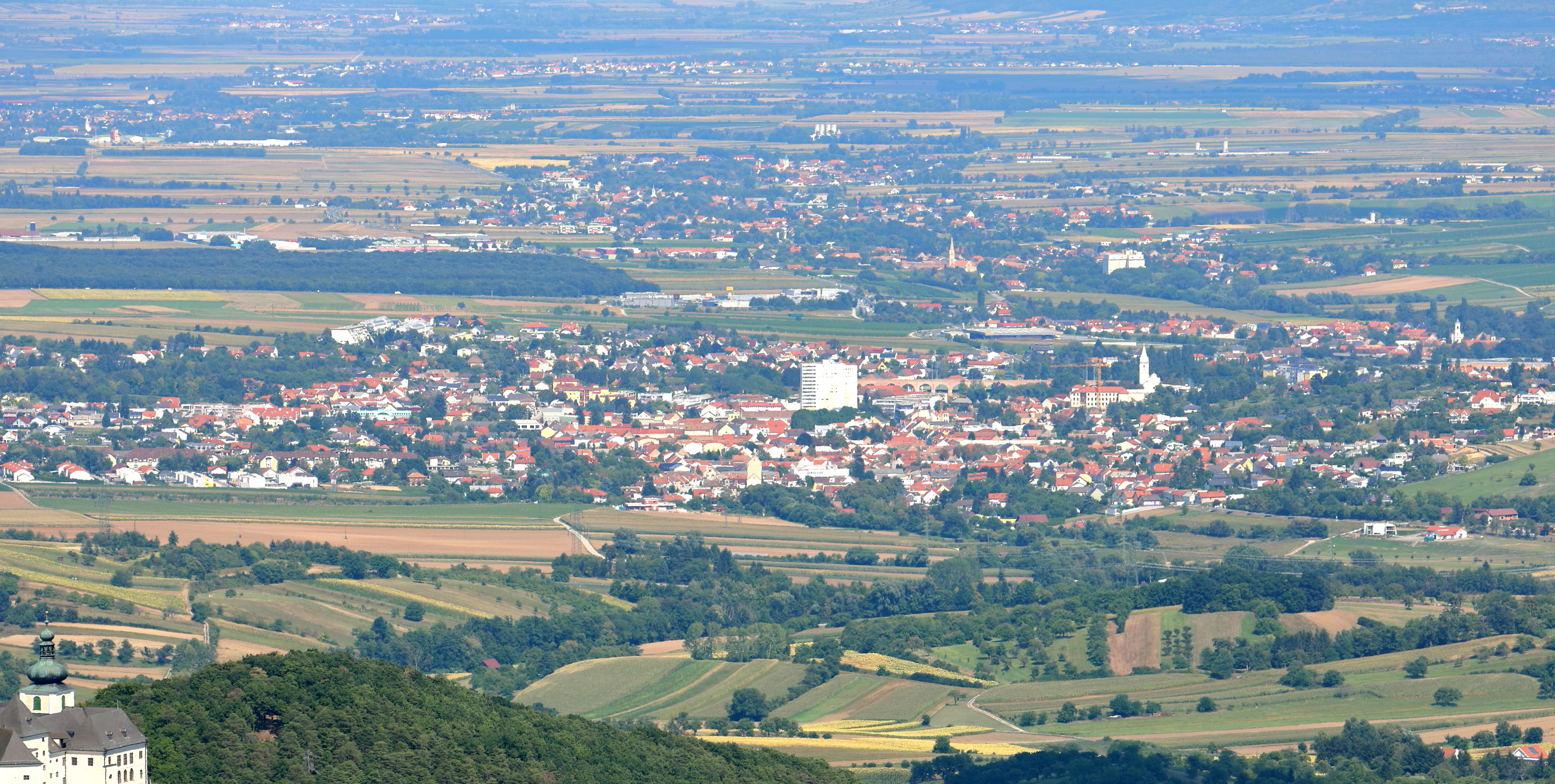
Mattersburg

== Sport ==
Mattersburg was home to the former Austrian Bundesliga team, SV Mattersburg until its dissolution in 2020, and is the home of the Sports table football Subbuteo team, TFC Mattersburg.

== Economy ==
One of the largest businesses in the area is the food company Felix Austria, who have their main headquarters in Mattersburg.

== Notable residents ==
- Simcha Bunim of Peshischa, born in Poland, studied here
- Áron Chorin, born in Bohemia, studied here
- Akiva Eger (aka Akiva Güns), born in Eisenstadt, studied here
- Akiva Ehrenfeld, Orthodox rabbi, born here
- Shmuel Ehrenfeld, the Mattersdorfer Rav, born here
- Pál Kitaibel, born here
- Jeremiah Mattersdorf, served as Chief Rabbi
- Moses Sofer, born in Germany, was a rabbi here

== See also ==
- Kiryat Mattersdorf
- Forchtenstein
