= Spetz =

Spetz is a surname of German origin, originating as a topographic name for someone who lived near a log road or wooden bridge. Notable people with the surname include:

- Georges Spetz (1844-1914), French painter, poet, and art collector
- Gustaf Spetz, Swedish singer
- William Spetz (born 1996), Swedish comedian and television personality

Anton Spetz (born 2010)

== See also ==
- Spitz (surname)
