= Elisha ben Solomon Ḥabillo =

Elisha ben Solomon Ḥabillo (Hebrew: אלישע בן שלמה חאביליו) (Note: Also spelled Chavillo.) was an 18th-century Venetian Talmudist and author, and a disciple of David Pardo. He was a descendant of a prominent Palestinian family of scholars.

== Works ==
Ḥabillo authored several works on Jewish law, liturgy, and biblical commentary, all of which were published in Livorno during the 1790s:

- Pat Leḥem (1794), on the laws of blessings, with particular emphasis on Birkat ha-Mazon
- Hamon Ḥogeg (1793), a commentary on the Passover Haggadah
- ‘Abodat ha-Tamid (1794), a commentary on the daily prayer book according to the Sephardic rite, in which he rejects many interpretations of Shabbethai Ḥayyim as heretical
- Shif‘at Rebibim (1793), a collection of liturgical poems by David Pardo, with additions of his own
