= Isaac Spitz =

- יצחק איצק שפיץ
- Born: 1764 or 1766; Kolín, Kingdom of Bohemia
- Died: 6 May 1842 (aged 77–78); Mladá Boleslav, Kingdom of Bohemia
- Resting place: Jewish cemetery of Mladá Boleslav
- Occupations: Rabbi, Av Beit Din, Writer
- Years active: 1792–1842
- Spouse: Rebekka Fleckeles (m. 1796; d. 1809)
- Children: Yom-Tov (Jonas) Spitz, Scheva Sophie, David, Jonas, Katharina, Sara
- Parent: Benjamin (Torah scribe)
- Relatives: Elazar Fleckeles (father-in-law); Moritz Hartmann (grandson)

Isaac Spitz (Hebrew: יצחק איצק שפיץ, romanized: Yitzḥak Itzik Shpitz; 1764 or 1766 – 6 May 1842) was a prominent Bohemian Jewish rabbi, halakhic authority, and scholar. He served as the Av Beit Din (head of the rabbinical court) in Mladá Boleslav (also known as Jungbunzlau or Bomsla), Bohemia, for nearly twenty years. Spitz was a key figure bridging traditional rabbinic scholarship with the modernization and gradual emancipation of Bohemian Jewry under the Habsburg monarchy in the late 18th and early 19th centuries.

He is also known for his literary contributions, most notably the posthumously published Hebrew collection Mat'ame Yitzḥak (Delicacies of Isaac), which preserved traditional elements of Bohemian Jewish liturgy and folklore during an era of rapid cultural modernization and Germanization.

== Biography ==
Isaac Spitz was born in Kolín, a major center of Jewish learning in the Kingdom of Bohemia under Habsburg rule. Sources differ on his exact birth year, citing either 1764 or 1765 (the Hebrew year 5526). He was the son of Benjamin, a Torah scribe (sofer stam), and was raised in a highly literate and religious environment.

Spitz's early life coincided with severe socio-political constraints on the Jewish population of Bohemia. Under the Familiants laws of 1726, the Habsburg administration capped the number of legally permitted Jewish families in Bohemia at 8,541. Residence was strictly restricted to designated quarters, and Jews were legally classified as servi camerae regis (serfs of the royal chamber), paying heavy protection taxes to local nobility and the crown. They were barred from many occupations, such as the open sale of alcohol or the leasing of mills, forcing most into petty trade, crafts, and moneylending. Despite these hardships, Kolín maintained a resilient Jewish community centered around its historic synagogue (rebuilt in 1696) and private Talmudic study circles.

Spitz displayed exceptional scholarly talents from an early age. In 1779, at age 14, he relocated to Prague to study at the yeshiva of Rabbi Yechezkel Landau, the Chief Rabbi of Prague widely known as the Noda B'Yehuda. Landau’s academy was one of the premier centers of Talmudic study in Europe, and his structured curriculum combined deep Talmudic analysis and the practical application of halakha (Jewish law). Under Landau’s supervision, Spitz mastered the Hebrew language and classical rabbinic literature. He also engaged with secular literature and the writings of early Haskalah (Jewish Enlightenment) figures and German philosophers, including Moses Mendelssohn and Gotthold Ephraim Lessing.

In 1785, Spitz moved to Fürth in Germany, another renowned hub of Jewish intellectual life within the Holy Roman Empire. There, he spent seven years in advanced rabbinic training at the yeshiva of Chief Rabbi Meshullam Solomon Kohn (author of Mafte'ach Shelomo). His studies culminated in 1792, when he received semikhah (rabbinic ordination) from the local beit din in Fürth, formally certifying him as a posek (halakhic decisor).

Upon his ordination, Spitz returned to his native Kolín, where he studied as a selected pupil under Rabbi Eleazar Kalir (Kallir), who had led the community since 1782. During this period, Spitz served as a private tutor and educator for the children of prominent Jewish households in Kolín, such as that of Adam Friedländer. His tenure in Kolín took place during a challenging decade, marked by imperial educational reforms under Emperor Joseph II and a devastating fire in 1796 that destroyed most of the Jewish Quarter.

Following his marriage, Spitz relocated to Strážnice (known in German and Jewish sources as Dresnitz, Breznitz, or Strassnitz), where he was appointed as a dayan (rabbinical judge) and Av Beit Din. He served in Strážnice for a long tenure, establishing a reputation as a highly capable and sharp-minded legal authority.

In 1824 (5584 AM), Spitz was appointed Av Beit Din of the provincial Jewish community in Mladá Boleslav (Jungbunzlau). He held this high office for nearly two decades until his death in 1842.

Spitz’s rabbinate in Mladá Boleslav occurred during the height of state-mandated modernization efforts in the Habsburg lands. Following Joseph II's Toleranzpatent of 1781, Bohemian rabbinical authorities faced increasing pressure to adopt secular educational models, utilize the German language, and shift toward modern civic integration. Spitz pursued a pragmatic, moderate path of "cautious engagement" with these reforms. Inspired by the approach of his father-in-law, Elazar Fleckeles, Spitz sought to preserve traditional Orthodox frameworks while complying with necessary civil requirements. He allowed secular education to exist alongside rigorous Torah study, making his own household a reflection of this intellectual synthesis.

His contemporaries widely praised his learning and leadership. In the responsa collection Sha'arei Torah (1822), he was addressed as "the great, outstanding, and sharp-minded light... famous for praise in all the cities of the district." His pupils included notable figures such as Rabbi Abraham Kohn (1806–1848), an early modernizing rabbi who later served in Lemberg.

== Personal life and family ==
In 1796, at approximately age 30, Spitz married Rebekka Fleckeles, the daughter of Rabbi Elazar Fleckeles, the Chief Rabbi of Prague and author of Teshubah me-Ahabah. This marriage connected Spitz to one of the most prestigious rabbinical dynasties of Bohemia, tracing lineage back to the Maharal of Prague. Immediately following their marriage, the couple lived in Prague at the household of Fleckeles, a conventional arrangement for promising young scholars.

In 1809 (5569 AM), Rebekka died at the young age of 30, leaving Spitz a widower with several young children. Spitz’s children and descendants went on to achieve major cultural and scholarly significance:

- Yom-Tov (Jonas) Spitz (1797–1874): A prominent Hebrew grammarian, essayist, and educator in Prague. Yom-Tov taught both Hebrew and German at the Jewish school in Prague and contributed sixteen scientific essays to the prestigious Hebrew periodical Bikkure ha-Ittim. He authored Alon Bakut (1826) and Zikron Eliezer (1827), commemorating his grandfather Elazar Fleckeles, as well as Toledot Yitzḥak, a biography of his father, Isaac Spitz. Yom-Tov also composed poems dedicated to his Prague mentor, Solomon Judah Rapoport (SHIR).
- Scheva Sophie Spitz: Married Israel Hartmann of Trhové Dušníky. She was the mother of the famous Austrian poet, journalist, and revolutionary Moritz Hartmann (1821–1872). In 1833, the young Moritz Hartmann boarded with his grandfather Isaac Spitz in Mladá Boleslav while attending the local Piarist secular gymnasium, exemplifying how Spitz's home hosted both traditional Jewish and modern secular studies.

In 1809, at age 45, Isak married Anna Spitz (born 1780). They had 9 children.

== Literary works and halakhic contributions ==
=== Mat'ame Yitzḥak ===
Spitz’s primary independent literary work was Mat'ame Yitzḥak (Hebrew: מטעמי יצחק, lit. 'Delicacies of Isaac' or 'Delights of Isaac'). Composed during his rabbinic career, the 68-page collection was published posthumously in Prague in 1843, edited and issued by his son Yom-Tov Spitz. The book is a compilation of Hebrew songs, melodies, epigrams, and sayings written in the poetic style of the early 19th century. The work is noted by scholars for preserving traditional Bohemian Jewish liturgy and folklore during a rapid era of cultural Germanization.

=== Halakhic contributions ===
Though Spitz did not publish a standalone volume of legal responsa during his lifetime, he was in constant written correspondence with the leading halakhic giants of his generation. Many of his legal opinions and letters were preserved in the works of his father-in-law, Elazar Fleckeles, including Teshubah me-Ahabah and Olat Chodesh. Spitz's rulings are cited in authoritative halakhic compilations such as the Pitchei Teshuvah (on Even HaEzer 3:3).

His correspondence also appears in:

- Kerem Shelomo by Rabbi Solomon Haas, the rabbi of Strážnice.
- Shemen Rokeach (Vol. 3, Orach Chaim, no. 35) by Rabbi Eleazar of Triesch.
- Sha'arei Torah (no. 28, dated 1822).

One notable halakhic query involving Spitz appears in Teshubah me-Ahabah (Vol. 1, no. 135), addressing whether smallpox inoculation was permitted on Shabbat. This specific ruling has been revisited in modern academic discussions concerning rabbinic responses to historic epidemics and pandemics.

== Death and burial ==
Isaac Spitz died in Mladá Boleslav on 6 May 1842 (26 Iyar 5602 AM) at the age of 77 or 78. He was buried in the historic Jewish cemetery of Mladá Boleslav, where his gravesite is preserved alongside other prominent rabbinic leaders of the town, such as Rabbi Ezekiel Glogau-Schlesinger.

Upon his death, Spitz was widely eulogized across Central Europe. Notably, a joint memorial sermon honoring both Spitz and Chief Rabbi Nachum Trebitsch of Moravia was delivered by Rabbi Avraham Samuel Benjamin Sofer (the Ktav Sofer) and subsequently published in his collected sermons, Drashot Ktav Sofer.
