= Karel Hartmann =

Czech ice hockey player (1885–1944)

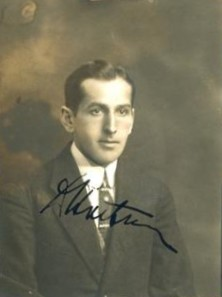
- Karel Hartmann in 1919
- Born: 6 July 1885 Příbram, Bohemia, Austria-Hungary
- Died: c. 16 October 1944 (aged 59) Auschwitz, German-occupied Poland
- Position: Rover
- National team: Czechoslovakia
- Playing career: 1909–1928
Medal record
Olympic Games
Bronze medal – third place	1920 Antwerp	Team

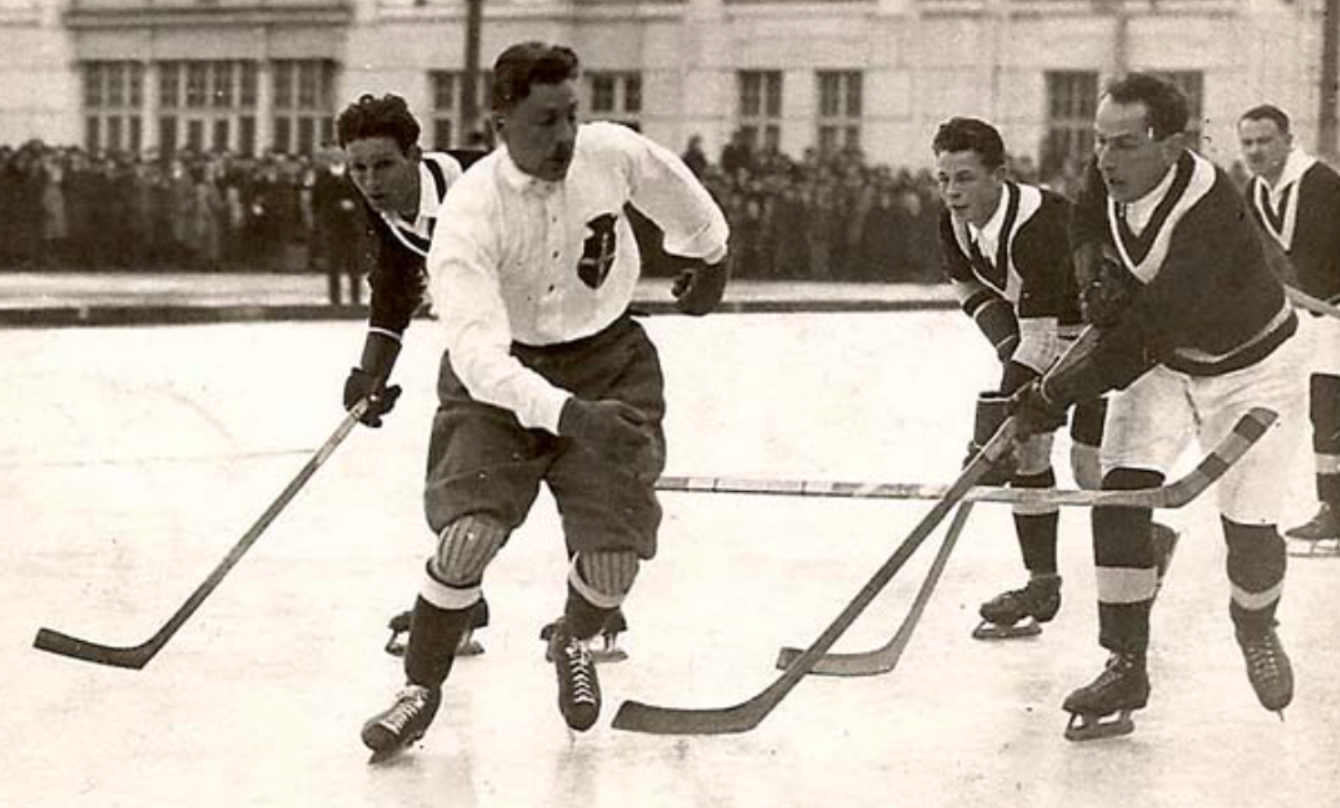
Karel Hartmann (right) in a Sparta Prague jersey during a match in Vienna with the Wiener Eislaufverein in 1924

Karel Hartmann (6 July 1885 – c. 16 October 1944) was a Czech ice hockey player who competed for Czechoslovakia in the Olympic Games in 1920. He was a member of the national team that won the bronze medal in Antwerp. He and his family were killed in the Holocaust.

== Biography ==
Hartmann was born in Trhové Dušníky into a Czech Jewish family, to parents Max and Emilie, née Hammerschlag. His family moved to Prague when he was very young. His great-uncle was Moritz Hartmann. In 1922 he succeeded Paul Loicq as vice-president of the International Ice Hockey Federation. In 1923 he was appointed the President of the Czechoslovak Hockey Association

On 23 July 1942, two weeks after his 57th birthday, he and his family were transported from Prague, where they lived, to the Theresienstadt Ghetto. From there on 16 October 1944, Hartmann, his wife and their two sons were transported to Auschwitz concentration camp, where Karel and Edita were most likely murdered in a gas chamber upon arrival.
