= Trausdorf an der Wulka =

Trausdorf an der Wulka Trajštof
- Municipality
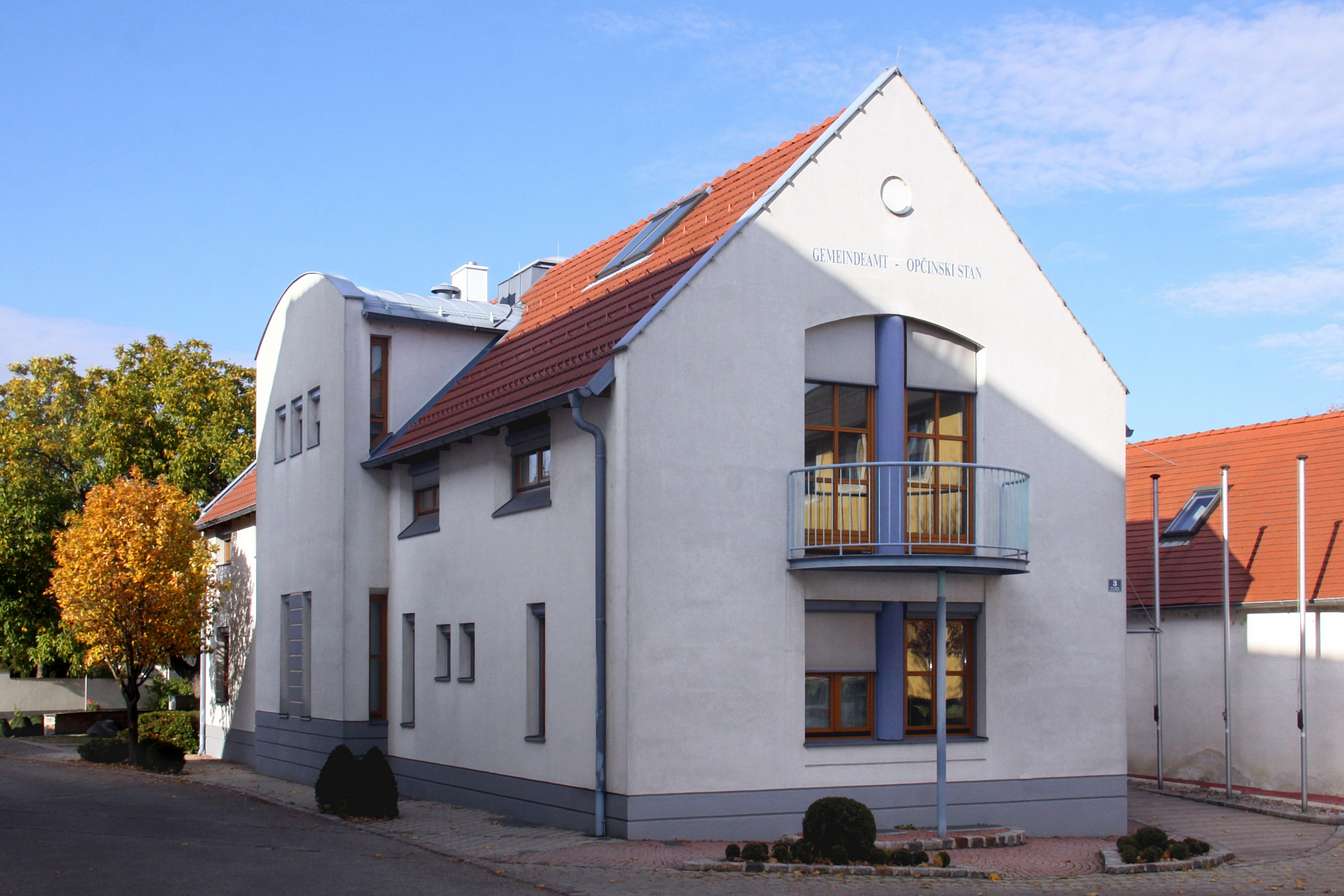
- Municipal office

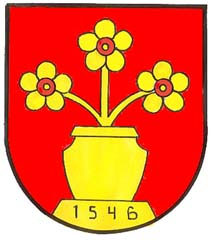
- Coat of arms

- Location within Austria
- Coordinates: 47°49′N 16°33′E
- Country: Austria
- State: Burgenland
- District: Eisenstadt-Umgebung

Government
  - Mayor: Viktor Hergovich (SPÖ)

Area
  - Total: 15.44 km^{2} (5.96 sq mi)
- Elevation: 151 m (495 ft)

Population (2022-01-01)
  - Total: 2,083
  - Density: 134.9/km^{2} (349.4/sq mi)
- Time zone: UTC+1 (CET)
  - Summer (DST): UTC+2 (CEST)
- Postal code: 7061
- Area code: 02682 (same as Eisenstadt)
- Website: www.trausdorf.eu

Trausdorf an der Wulka (Burgenland Croatian: Trajštof, Hungarian: Darázsfalu) is a town in the district of Eisenstadt-Umgebung in the Austrian state of Burgenland. It is on the Wulka river.

== Population ==
Historical population
Year	Pop.	±%
1869	1,152	—
1880	1,308	+13.5%
1890	1,214	−7.2%
1900	1,286	+5.9%
1910	1,340	+4.2%
1923	1,333	−0.5%
1934	1,450	+8.8%
1939	1,435	−1.0%
1951	1,406	−2.0%
1961	1,303	−7.3%
1971	1,328	+1.9%
1981	1,456	+9.6%
1991	1,647	+13.1%
2001	1,723	+4.6%
2011	1,883	+9.3%
2021	2,067	+9.8%

== Culture ==
In 2016, local Croats founded female klapa group "Evo nas".
