= Ḥayyim Shabbethai =

Sephardic rabbi and Talmudist

- Title: The Maharhash (המהרח"ש)

Personal life
- Born: Hayyim Shabbethai; 1557 Thessaloniki, Ottoman Empire
- Died: 1647 (aged 89–90) Thessaloniki, Ottoman Empire
- Children: Moses Shabbethai
- Parent: Rabbi Shabbethai (father)
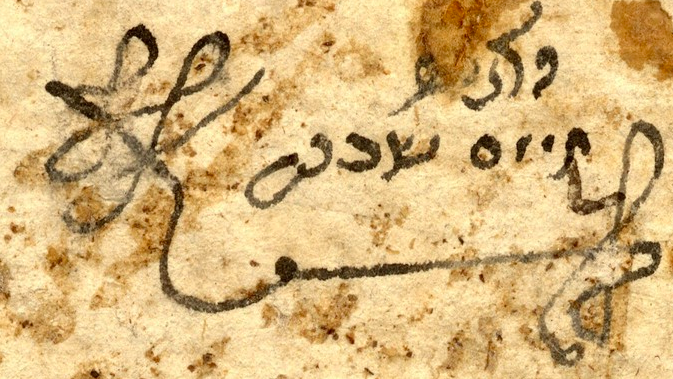
- Signature

Religious life
- Religion: Judaism

Jewish leader
- Main work: Sefer Torah Hayyim

Ḥayyim ben Shabbethai (Hebrew: רבי חיים בן שבתי), commonly known by the acronym Maharhash (Hebrew: מהרח"ש, MArenu HA-Rav ḤAyyim SHabbethai, literally translating to "Our teacher, the Rabbi Hayyim Shabbethai"; 1557 - 1647) was a Sephardic rabbi and Talmudist, who is considered to be one of the great sages of Greek Jewry, serving as the Chief Rabbi of Thessaloniki, Greece.

== Early life ==
Born in Thessaloniki, c. 1557, his father Rabbi Shabbethai may have been a minor community leader. In his early years he studied under Rabbi Aaron Sason, Rabbi Joseph Escapa, Rabbi Shlomo HaCohen and Rabbi Samuel de Medina. At the age of thirty seven, he subsequently became the Rosh Yeshivah of the "Shalom" community. Thousands of students came to his Yeshiva from surrounding Balkan communities and he had several illustrious pupils such as; Yehoshua Khandali, and David Conforte. In 1607 he succeeded Samuel Florentine as the Chief Rabbi of Thessaloniki.

== Rabbinic position ==
During his time as the Chief Rabbi of Thessaloniki, Shabbethai exemplified himself as a leading halakhic authority of his time. His tenure was defined not only by excellent local leadership but also by an extensive relationship to other diasporic communities, (notably the Sephardic Jews of Dutch Brazil, headed by Moses Raphael de Aguilar and Isaac Aboab da Fonseca). In fact one of the three volumes of his responsa Sefer Torat Hayyim relates to a question asked by the Jews of Brazil, regarding whether they should pray for rain, due to the reversal of seasons south of the equator. This ultimately ended up being the first recorded responsa of the New World. In addition, he had close relationships with the communities of Safed, Venice, Sofia and Rhodes, who would often approach Shabbethai for halakhic direction. He devoted himself assiduously to congregational matters, introducing many important halakhic regulations, which are relevant to this day.

== Works ==
Some of his most famous works are as follows:

- Sefer Torat Ḥayyim (ספר תורת חיים) - widely considered his Magnum Opus, published in 1713, 1715, 1722 in Thessaloniki. A three volume responsa (שאלות ותשובות), mostly on Shulchan Aruch, Even Ha'ezer, Choshen Mishpat and laws relating to agunot as well as several other different topics.
- Torat ha-Zevaaḥ (תורת הזבח) - on the laws of kosher ritual animal slaughter and inspection.
- Moda'ah ve-Ones (מודעה ואונס) - published in 1628 in Thessaloniki, and once again in 1798 in Lviv, with commentaries of Jeremiah Mattersdorf and his son Joab. On laws regarding contracts entered into under duress.

He also wrote several commentaries on the talmudic tractate Ta'anit as well as others, which were printed in "Sefer Torat Moshe" written by his son Moses Shabbethai.
