= Jeremiah Mattersdorf =

Polish Jewish rabbi and author

- Title: Rabbi Mattersdorf

Personal life
- Born: Jeremiah Rosenbaum Pošná, Kingdom of Bohemia
- Died: 1805 Aszód, Kingdom of Hungary
- Spouse: Lea Reizel Halevi
- Children: Joab Mattersdorf
- Parent: Rabbi Isaac Itzhak (father)

Religious life
- Religion: Judaism

Jewish leader
- Successor: Joab Mattersdorf
- Main work: Moda'ah Rabbah

Jeremiah ben Isaac Mattersdorf (Hebrew: רב ירמיהו בן יצחק ממטרסדורף; born Rosenbaum; died 1805) was a Polish Jewish rabbi and author, who served as the Chief Rabbi of Mattersburg, Austria and Abaújszánto, Hungary.

== Biography ==
Born in Oswiecim, Galicia sometime in the mid-18th century, his father Itzhak served as the head rabbi of Oswiecim. In his early years, Mattersdorf studied under Rabbi Meir Eisenstadt. In about 1770, he was appointed as the Chief Rabbi of Mattersburg, after which he changed his surname to "Mattersdorf". During his tenure as the Mattersburg Rabbi he headed a yeshivah which had among its students Aaron Chorin and Simcha Bunim of Peshischa. Although due to immense economic hardship in Mattersburg, he decided to move to Abaújszánto in 1801, where he was appointed the Chief Rabbi of the community. He eventually moved to Aszód, Hungary where he died in 1805. His most famous work was Moda'ah Rabbah (מודעה רבא), a commentary on Ḥayyim Shabbethai's "Torat Ḥayyim".
