= Bucklige Welt =

Region in Niederösterreich

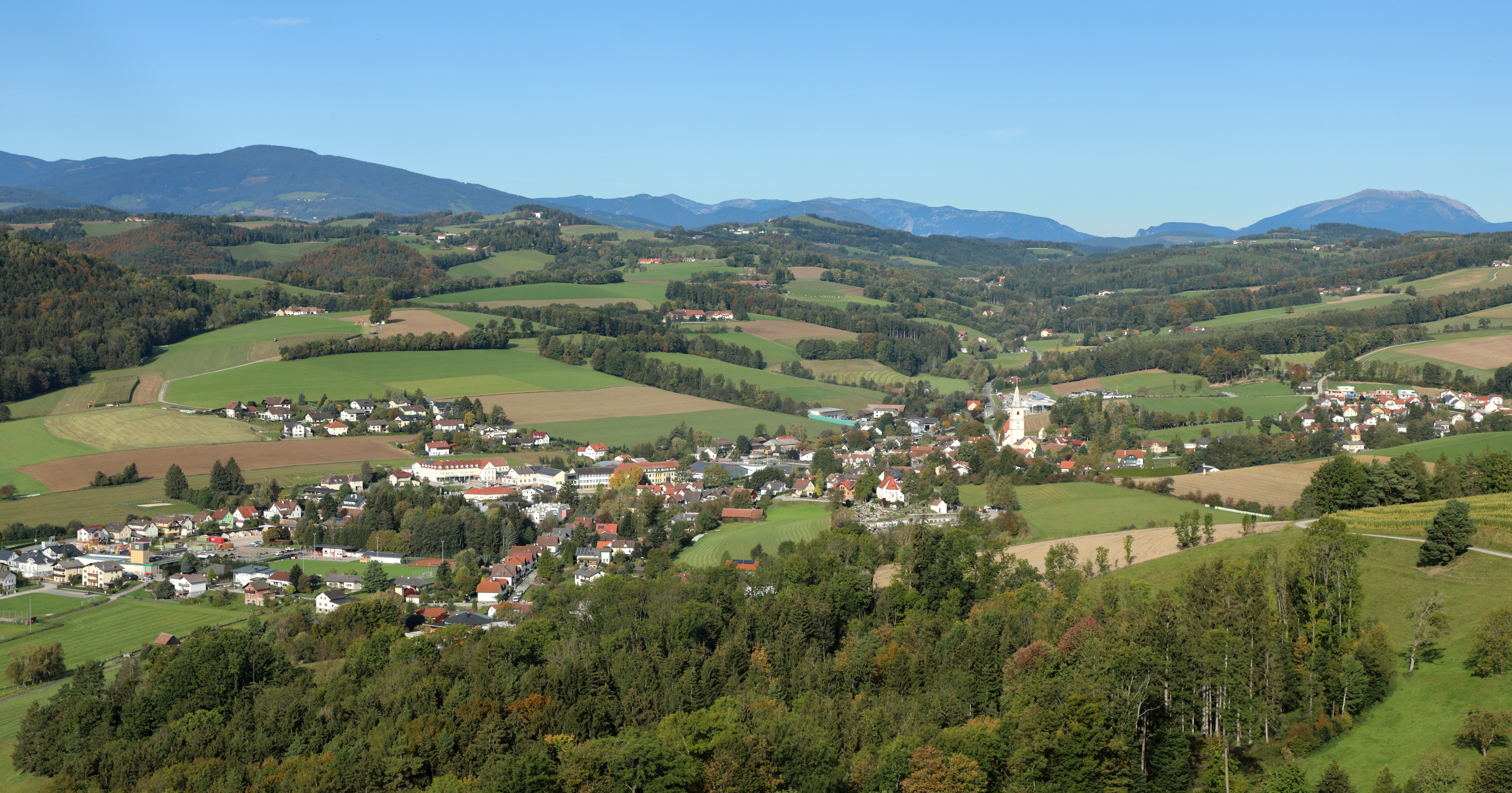
- View over Krumbach and into the Bucklige Welt

Highest point
- Peak: Eselberg
- Elevation: 974 m above sea level (AA)

Dimensions
- Length: 30 km (19 mi)

Geography
- Location within Austria
- State(s): Lower Austria, Austria
- Range coordinates: 47°37.370′N 16°11.466′E
- Parent range: Prealps East of the Mur, Central Alps, Alps

The Bucklige Welt is a region in southeast Lower Austria. It is also known as the "land of a thousand hills" (Land der 1000 Hügel).

== Geography ==
The Bucklige Welt is a hill country area on the eastern edge of the Alps. Its height varies between 375 and 900 m (AA). Its name, which means something like 'hilly world', is due to the very large number of hills and mountains which are known by the locals as Buckln.

In the southwest the Bucklige Welt is bounded by the Wechsel massif and in the west by the Semmering region. To the north it descends into the Vienna Basin, into which it is drained by the Pitten. To the east the Rosalia Mountains form the boundary, to the south of which the Bucklige Welt faces Oberpullendorf in the Central Burgenland Bay. To the south is the Geschriebenstein.

There was no glaciation during the ice age in the area of the Bucklige Welt because of its low elevation. The summit of the Hochwechsel must therefore only have a slight covering of firn snow.

== Climate ==
Despite its small size, the Buckelige Welt has three different climatic zones: its southeastern part belongs to Austria's 'Illyrian climate province', while a Pannonian climate predominates in the northern edge area. The central and higher areas can be assigned to the alpine transitional climate.
