= Meir Eisenstadt =

18th Century Austrian Rabbi

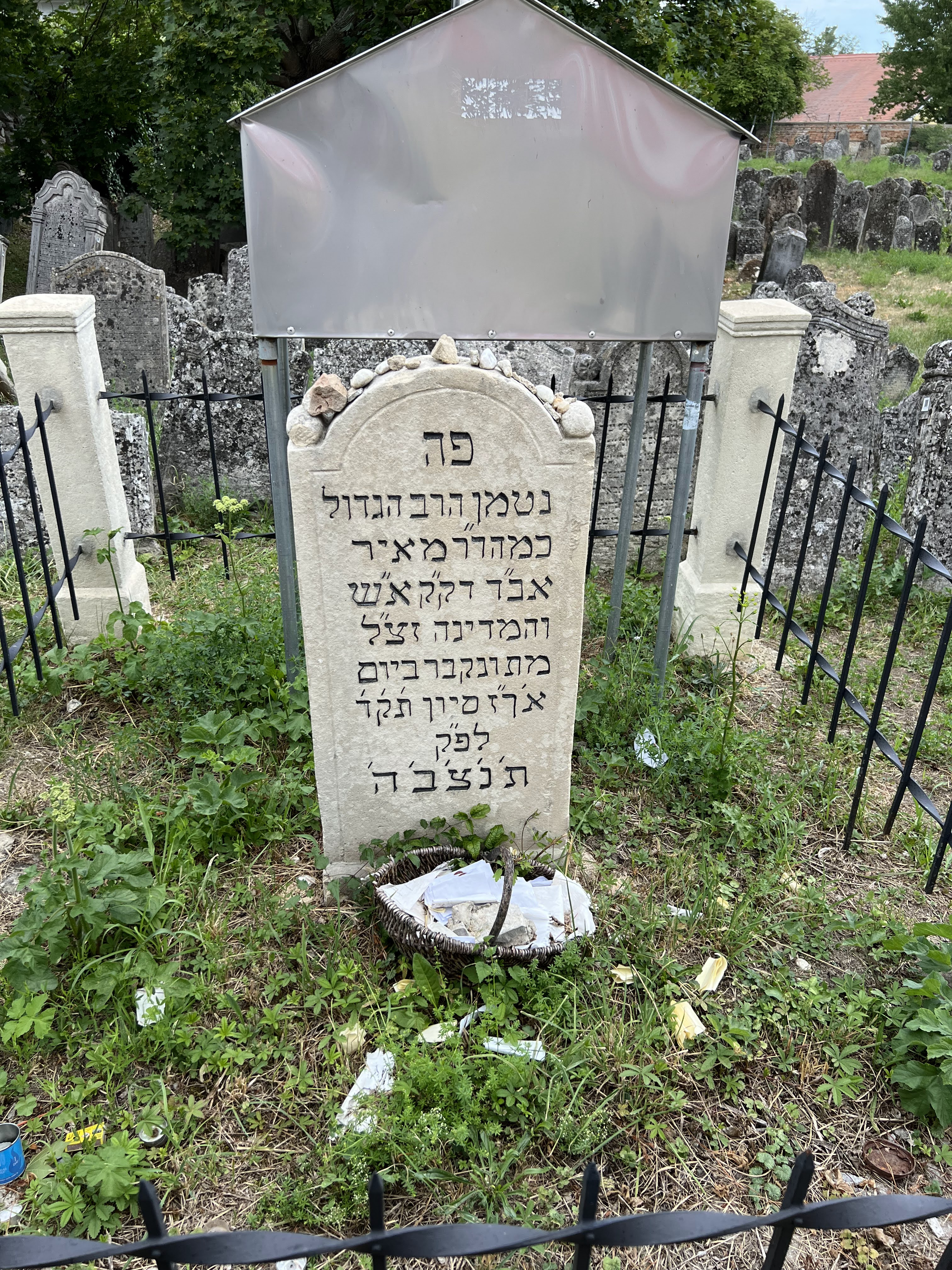
Gravestone in the Old Jewish Cemetery, Eisenstadt, July 2022

Meir ben Izsak Eisenstadt (Hebrew: מאיר איזנשטט, also Meir Ash, c. 1670 in Poznań – 1744 in Eisenstadt) was the author of responsa and other works of rabbinic literature. An authority on Halakha, he was consulted by rabbis from Turkey, Germany and Italy. He is known as the Panim Me'irot (or Punim Meirois in Yiddish) after his major work called Shu"t Panim Me'irot. He is also known as the Maharam Ash (or Maharam Esh) the Hebrew acronym for "Our Teacher, Rabbi Meir EisenStadt".

== Biography ==
After serving as a dayan in Posen and rabbi in Szydłowiec, Poland, he went to Germany and settled in Worms where he headed the yeshiva. When Worms was taken by the French in 1701 he moved to Prostějov (German: Prossnitz) as rabbi. From 1711 to 1714 he returned to Szydłowiec but then moved to Eisenstadt (now in Austria) (adopting the name of the town) serving as rabbi of the Seven Communities. Eisenstadt greatly influenced the nature of the community and his yeshiva attracted students from far and near. His best known students are probably Jonathan Eybeschutz and Jeremiah Mattersdorf.

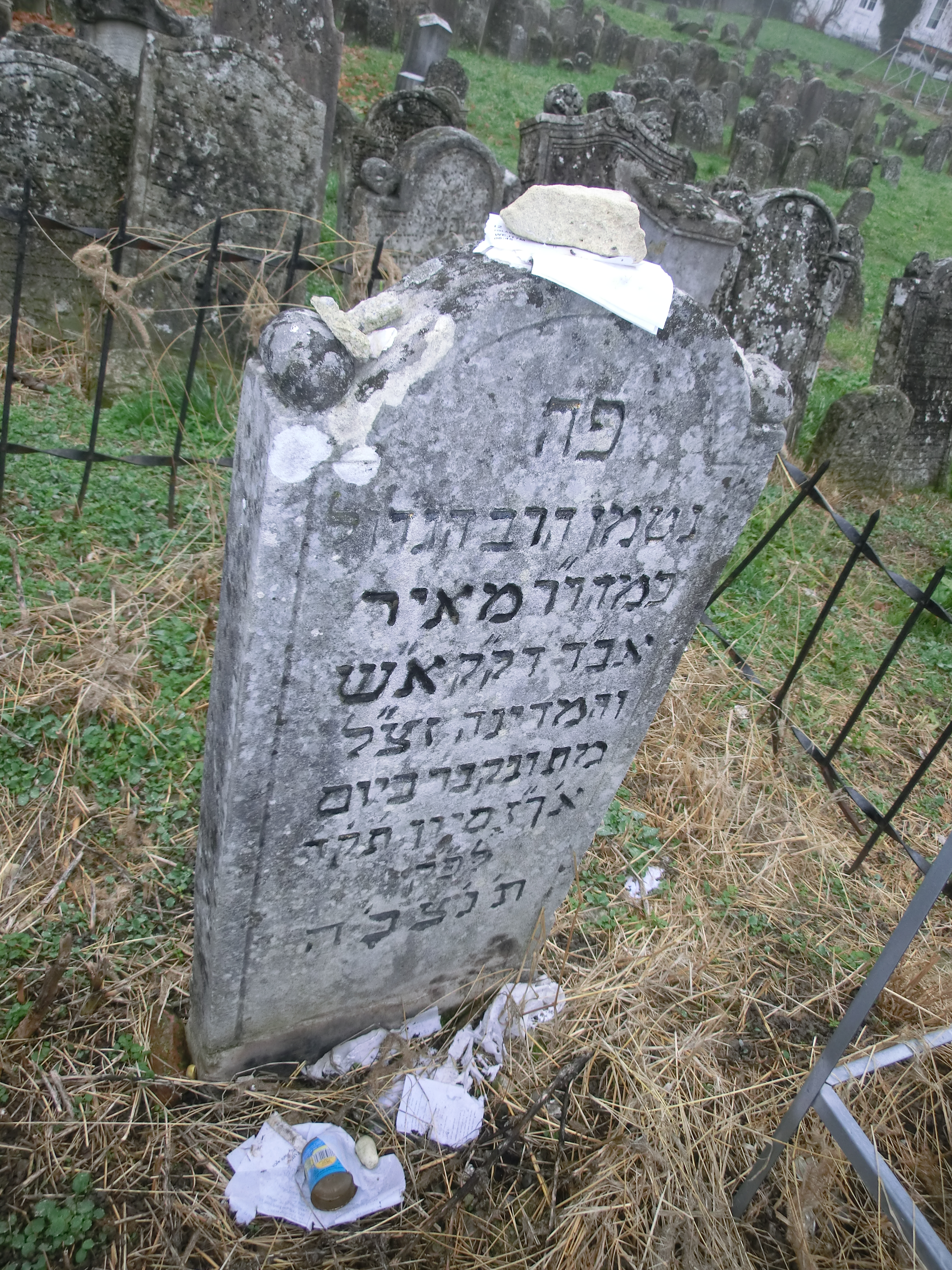
Gravestone in Old Jewish Cemetery, Eisenstadt, November 2012.

== Works ==
Maharam Esh was the author of:

- "Or ha-Ganuz", novellae on marriage law (Ketubot) and notes on Yoreh De'ah.
- "Panim Me'irot", responsa and novellae on various Talmudic treatises.
- "Kotnot Or", homiletic commentary on the Pentateuch and the Five Scrolls, (published, with the "Or Chadash" of his grandson, Eleazar Kallir, under the title "Meore Esh" the latter word being an abbreviation of "Eisenstadt").
