= Yom-Tob Spitz =

Teacher (1797–1874)

Jonas Yom-Tob Spitz (Hebrew: יום־טוב בן איציק שפיץ, romanized: Yom-Tov ben Itzik Shpitz; 1797–1874) was a teacher of Hebrew and German in the Jewish school of Prague during the first half of the nineteenth century. He was the author of Alon bakut (Prague, 1826), on the death of his grandfather Rabbi Eleazar Fleckeles of Prague; Zikhron Eliezer (Prague, 1827), a biography of Fleckeles; and Toledot Yitzḥak, a biography of his father, Isaac Spitz. Spitz was a collaborator on the Bikkure ha-Ittim, to volumes VI and VII of which he contributed sixteen scientific essays.
