= Trhové Dušníky =

- Municipality
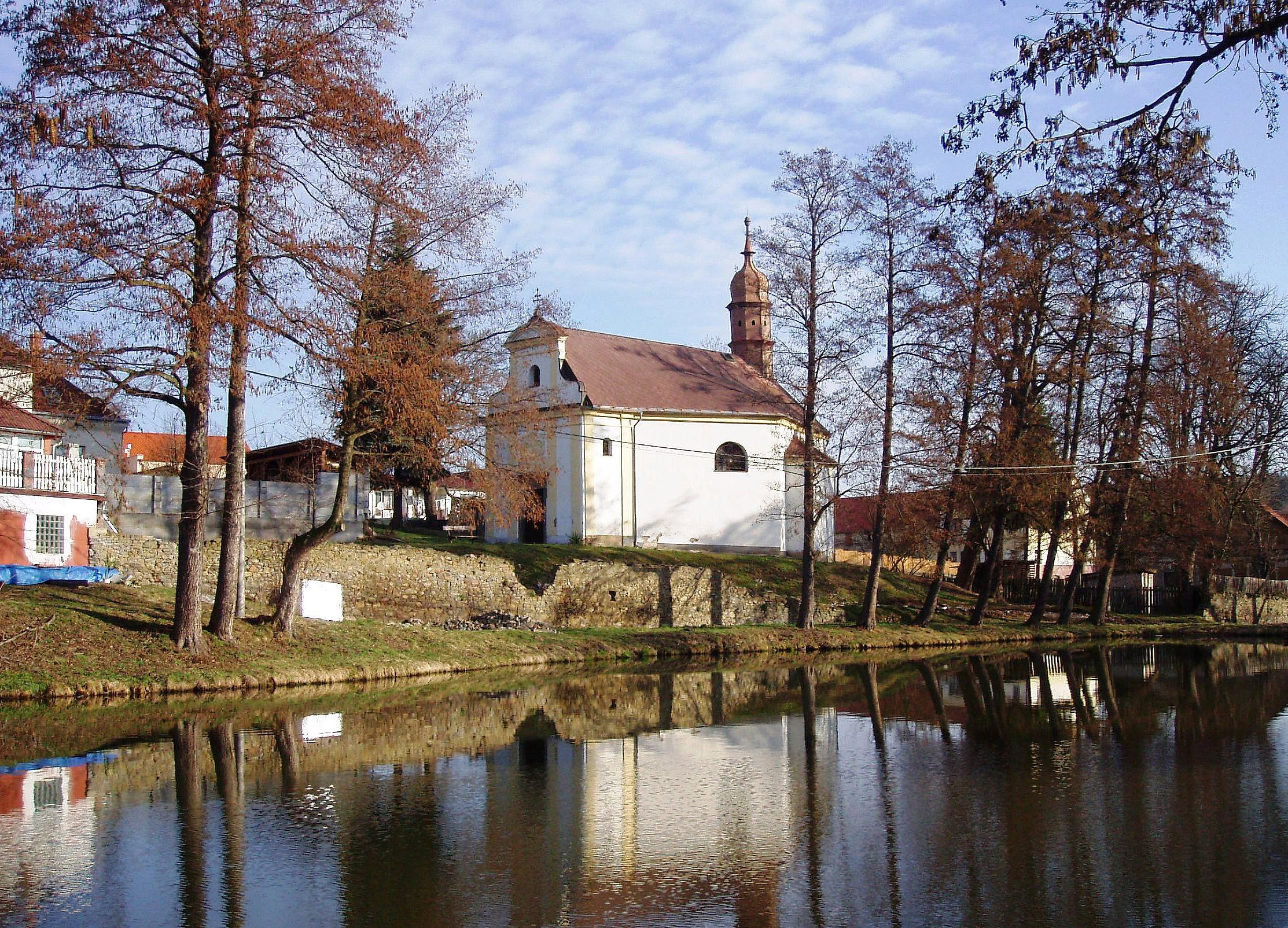
- Church of the Holy Trinity

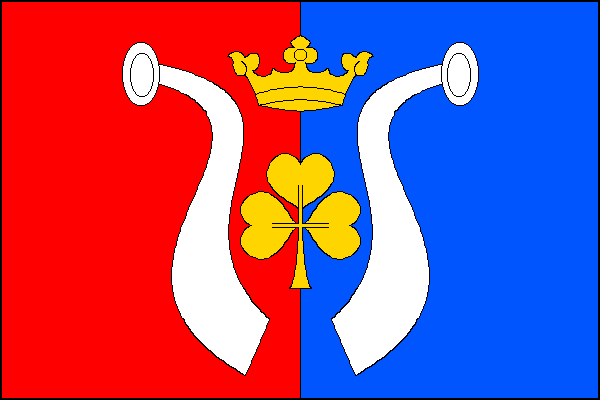
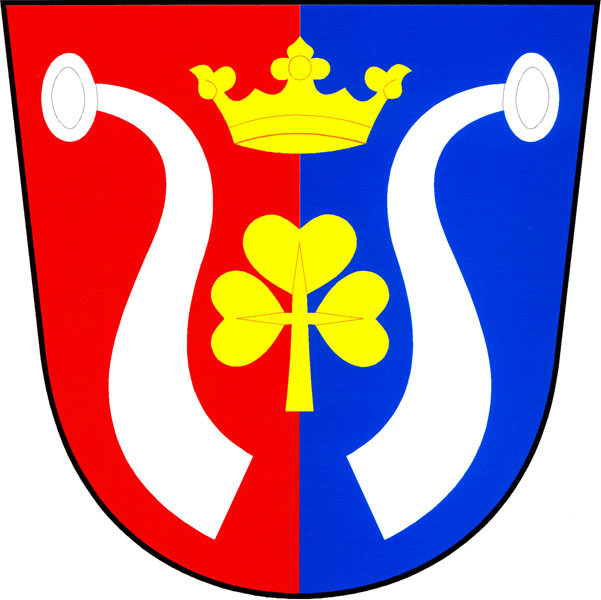
- Flag Coat of arms

- Location in the Czech Republic
- Coordinates: 49°42′50″N 14°0′44″E
- Country: Czech Republic
- Region: Central Bohemian
- District: Příbram
- First mentioned: 1321

Area
  - Total: 6.90 km^{2} (2.66 sq mi)
- Elevation: 450 m (1,480 ft)

Population (2026-01-01)
  - Total: 703
  - Density: 102/km^{2} (264/sq mi)
- Time zone: UTC+1 (CET)
  - Summer (DST): UTC+2 (CEST)
- Postal code: 261 01
- Website: www.trhovedusniky.cz

Trhové Dušníky is a municipality and village in Příbram District in the Central Bohemian Region of the Czech Republic. It has about 700 inhabitants. It is located on the Litavka River.

== Demographics ==
Historical population
Year	Pop.	±%
1869	586	—
1880	681	+16.2%
1890	808	+18.6%
1900	823	+1.9%
1910	812	−1.3%
1921	625	−23.0%
1930	606	−3.0%
1950	417	−31.2%
1961	419	+0.5%
1970	373	−11.0%
1980	347	−7.0%
1991	358	+3.2%
2001	391	+9.2%
2011	406	+3.8%
2021	438	+7.9%
Source: Censuses

== Notable people ==
- Moritz Hartmann (1821–1872), poet, politician and author
- Karel Hartmann (1885–1944), ice hockey player and official
