= Moritz Hartmann =

Bohemian-Austrian poet, politician and author

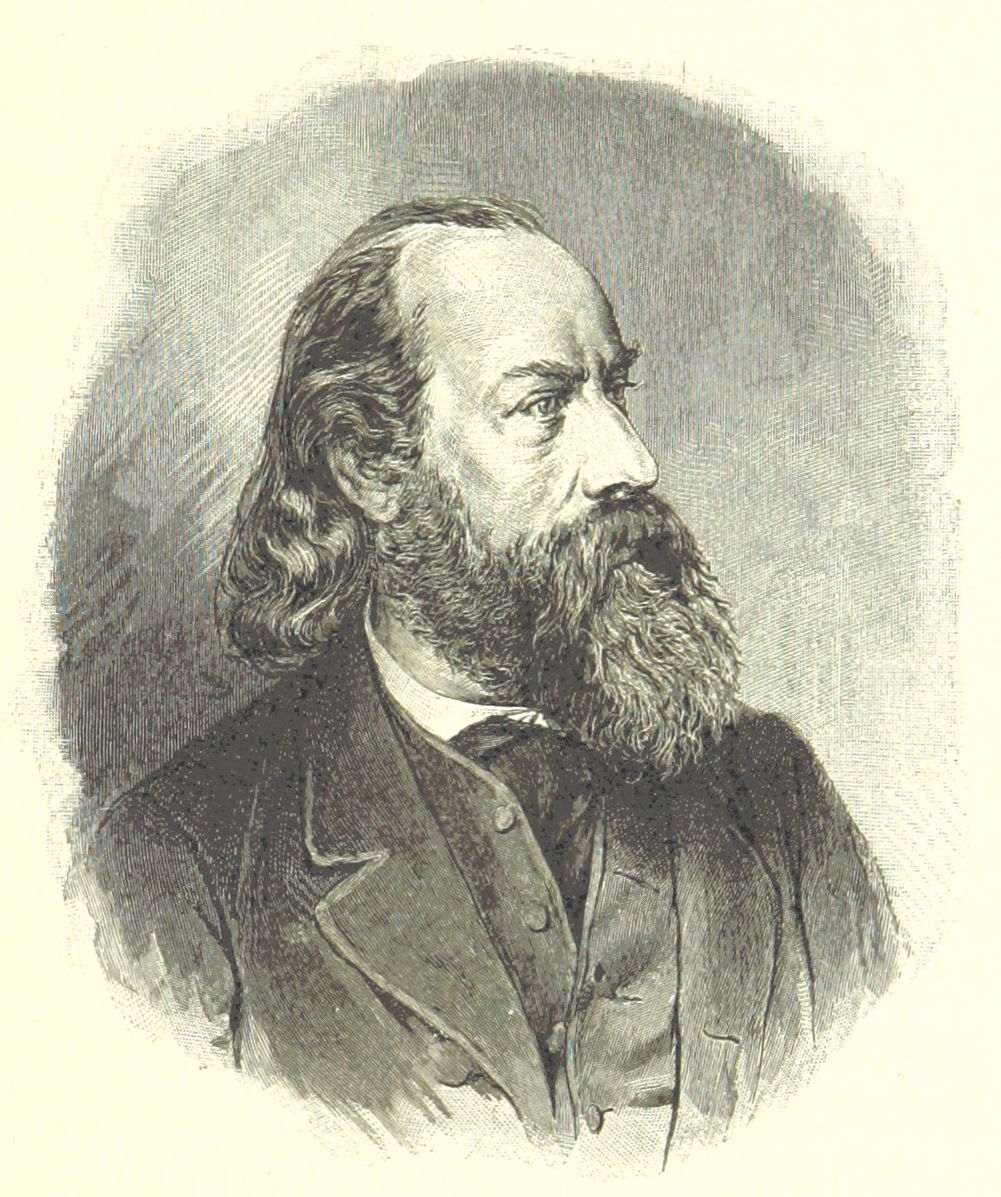
- Born: 15 October 1821; Trhové Dušníky
- Died: 13 May 1872 (aged 50); Oberdöbling
- Relatives: Karel Hartmann, great-nephew
- Writing career
- Language: German
- Genre: Poetry
- Literary movement: The Revolutions of 1848 in the Habsburg areas

Moritz Hartmann (15 October 1821 – 13 May 1872) was a Bohemian-Austrian poet, politician and author.

== Biography ==
Hartmann was born of Jewish parentage at Duschnik (now Trhové Dušníky) in Bohemia. His maternal grandfather, Isaac Spitz, served as av beit din in Bunzlau. As a young man, Hartmann abandoned Judaism although he never formally converted to Christianity.

Having studied philosophy at Prague and Vienna, he travelled in south Germany, Switzerland and Italy, and became tutor in a family at Vienna. In 1845, he proceeded to Leipzig and there published a volume of patriotic poems, Kelch und Schwert (1845). Fearing in consequence prosecution at the hands of the authorities, he abided events in France and Belgium, and after issuing in Leipzig Neuere Gedichte (1846) returned home, where he suffered a short term of imprisonment.

In 1848, he was elected member for Leitmeritz district in the short-lived German parliament at Frankfurt-am-Main, in which he sided with the extreme radical party. He took part with Robert Blum in the revolution of that year in Vienna. On its collapse, he joined the "rump parliament" (a remnant of the Frankfurt parliament) in Stuttgart, and finally escaped to London and Paris.

In 1849, he published Reimchronik des Pfaffen Mauritius, a satirical political poem in the style of Heine. During the Crimean War (1854–56) Hartmann was correspondent of the Kölnische Zeitung. In 1860, he settled in Geneva as a teacher of German literature and history, became in 1865 editor of the Freya in Stuttgart and in 1868 a member of the staff of the Neue Freie Presse in Vienna.

Moritz Hartmann died at Oberdöbling, near Vienna, in 1872, aged 50.

== Works ==
Among Hartmann's numerous works may be especially mentioned Der Krieg um den Wald (The War over the forest; 1850), a novel, the scene of which is laid in Bohemia; Tagebuch aus Languedoc und Provence (Diary from Languedoc and Provence; 1852); Erzählungen eines Unsteten (Tales of a restless person; 1858); and Die letzten Tage eines Konigs (The last days of a king; 1867). He also produced an idyll, Adam and Eva (1851), and a collection of poetical tales, Schatten (Shadows; 1851).

His Gesammelte Werke (collected works) were published in 10 vols. in 1873–1874, and a selection of his Gedichte in the latter year. The first two volumes of a new edition of his works contain a biography of Hartmann by O. Wittner. See also E. Ziel, "Moritz Hartmann" (in Unsere Zeit, 1872); A. Marchand, Les poètes lyriques de l'Autriche (1892); Brandes, Das junge Deutschland (Charlottenburg, 1899).

== Evaluation ==
Hartmann's poems are often lacking in genuine poetical feeling, but the love of liberty which inspired them, and the fervour, ease and clearness of their style compensated for these shortcomings and gained him a wide circle of admirers. He possessed little talent for epic narrative.
