= Joachim Edler von Popper =

Joachim Edler von Popper (20 October 1722 – 11 May 1795) came from a family of entrepreneurs and communal leaders from Březnice (Breznitz) in the Kingdom of Bohemia, now the Czech Republic. His father, Wolf Popper, was a Primator (Chief Judge) of the Jews of Bohemia.

Joachim Popper moved from Březnice to Prague and prospered there as a merchant (woolens, potash, whalebone), banker and manufacturer. In the mid-eighteenth century, Holy Roman Emperor Leopold II held a monopoly of tobacco in Austria-Hungary. Leopold divided the monopoly into leases and awarded them to Joachim, Israel Edler von Hönigsberg, and Salomon Dobruschka.

On 27 May 1790, Joachim was ennobled as the first "Edler von Popper". He was the second Austrian Jew to be ennobled, not having to convert to Catholicism or be baptized in order to do so.

Joachim Edler von Popper was also a public figure and benefactor. He founded a beth midrash in Prague with Israel Fränkel, and helped fund the construction of the Popper Synagogue.

Joachim did not have any biological children, but he adopted his great-nephew Simon Popper, who inherited his title as Simon Edler von Popper. He also adopted his nephew Abraham Löbl Duschenes, who inherited his title as Andreas Josef Edler von Popper, and Elke Joß, who married Moses Dobruška. Elke was disinherited because of her conversion.
