= Shlomo HaKohen of Greece =

Shlomo Hacohen of Greece may refer to two people:

- Rabbi Shlomo Hacohen, author of responsa, published Salonika-Venice 1586–1730.
- Another Shlomo Hacohen, possibly ca. 1800, mekubal and posek, known for his commentary to the kabbalistic works of Isaac Luria. This Shlomo's son, Yehudah HaKohen also published a kabbalistic work Ashmoret HaBoker (1853), and a halakhic work Oholei Yehudah (1843), on the Mishneh Torah of Maimonides.
