= Wulka =

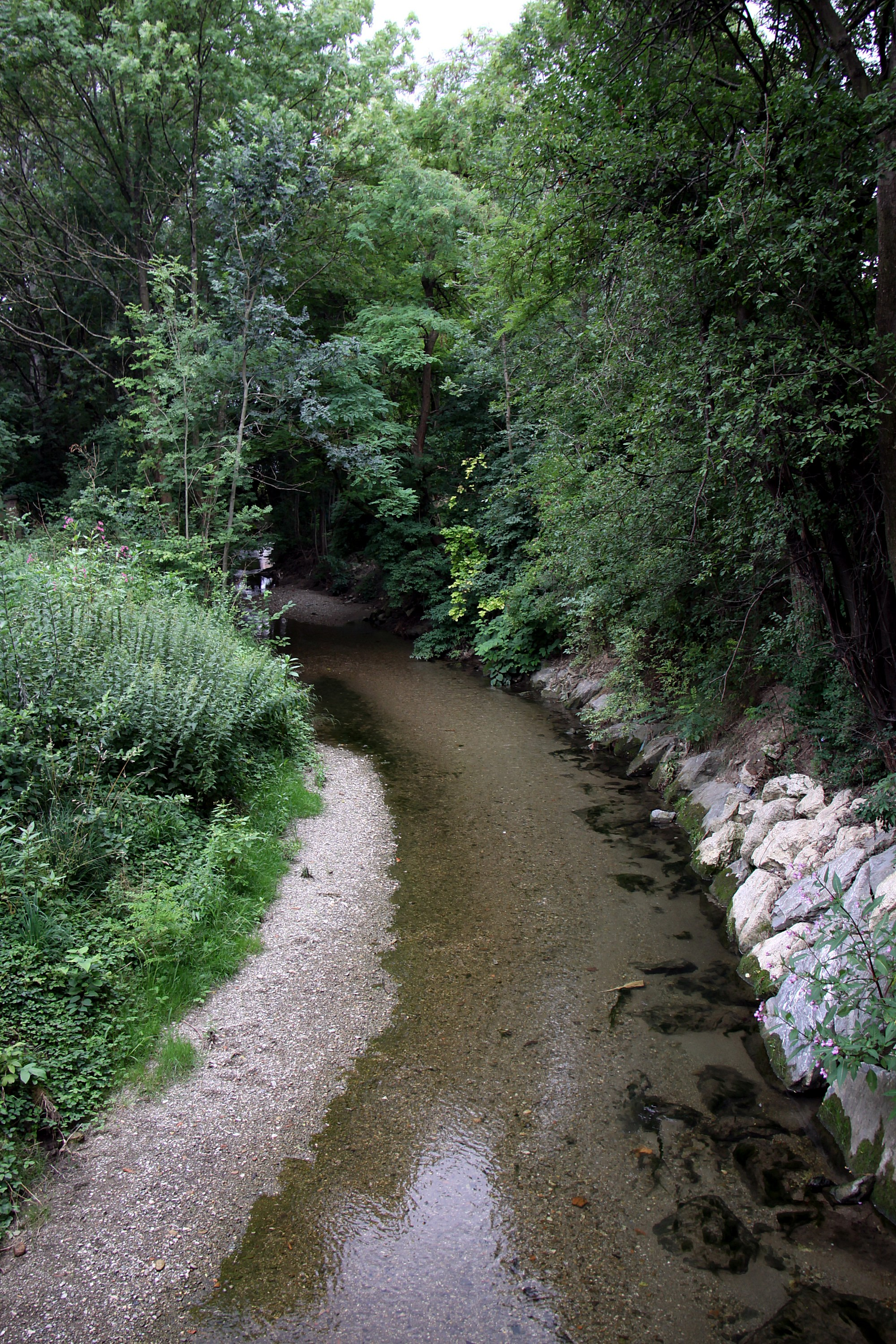
- The Wulka in Pöttelsdorf

Location
- Country: Austria
- State: Burgenland

Physical characteristics
- Source
  - location: Near Forchtenstein
  - coordinates: 47.7014°N 16.3079°E
- Mouth
  - location: Near Donnerskirchen into Lake Neusiedl
  - coordinates: 47.8731°N 16.7281°E
- Basin size: 402 km^{2} (155 sq mi)

Basin features
- Progression: Lake Neusiedl→ Hanság-főcsatorna→ Rabnitz→ Danube→ Black Sea

The Wulka (German pronunciation: [ˈvʊlka]) is a river of Burgenland, Austria. Its basin area is 402 km^{2} (155 sq mi).

The river springs near Forchtenstein and the border to Lower Austria. It flows through Trausdorf an der Wulka and discharges near Donnerskirchen into Lake Neusiedl, in former times a runoff-free lake, but nowadays drained by an artificial channel, the Hanság-főcsatorna, into the Danube.

An article in the Journal of Hydrology stated that "Waste water treatment plants contributed up to 68% of monthly flow of River Wulka into the lake."

== See also ==
- Rosalia Mountains
