= Hoiberg =

Hoiberg is a surname. Notable people with the surname include:

- Dale Hoiberg, American sinologist and editor
- Fred Hoiberg (born 1972), American basketball player and coach

== See also ==
- Markus Høiberg (born 1991), Norwegian curler
- Nina Høiberg (born 1956), Danish chess player
- Pierre-Emile Højbjerg (born 1995), Danish footballer
