= Eleazar ben Eleazar Kallir =

Hungarian rabbi and author

Eleazar Kallir

Personal life
- Born: 1728
- Died: 1805 (aged 76–77) Kolín, Bohemia

Religious life
- Religion: Judaism

Eleazar ben Eleazar Kallir (Hebrew: אלעזר בן אלעזר קליר, romanized: Elʻazar ben Elʻazar Ḳalir; 1728–1805) (Note: Died in Ḥeshvan 5561 (October–November 1800) according to Fuenn.) was a Hungarian rabbi and author, who served as av beit din of Rechnitz and of Kolín. He was the grandson of Meir Eisenstadt, author of Panim Me'irot.

He wrote Or Ḥadash, in three parts: (a) commentary on the Pentateuch which forms a part of his grandfather's work Kotnot Or (Fürth, 1766); (b) novellæ on Pesaḥim; and (c) novellæ on Ḳiddushin (Frankfort-on-the-Oder and Vienna, 1766–1799). He also published Ḥavvot Ya'ir Ḥadash (Prague, 1792), a collection of sermons, and Ḥeḳer Halakhah (Vienna, 1838), responsa.
