= Hochwolkersdorf =

- Municipality
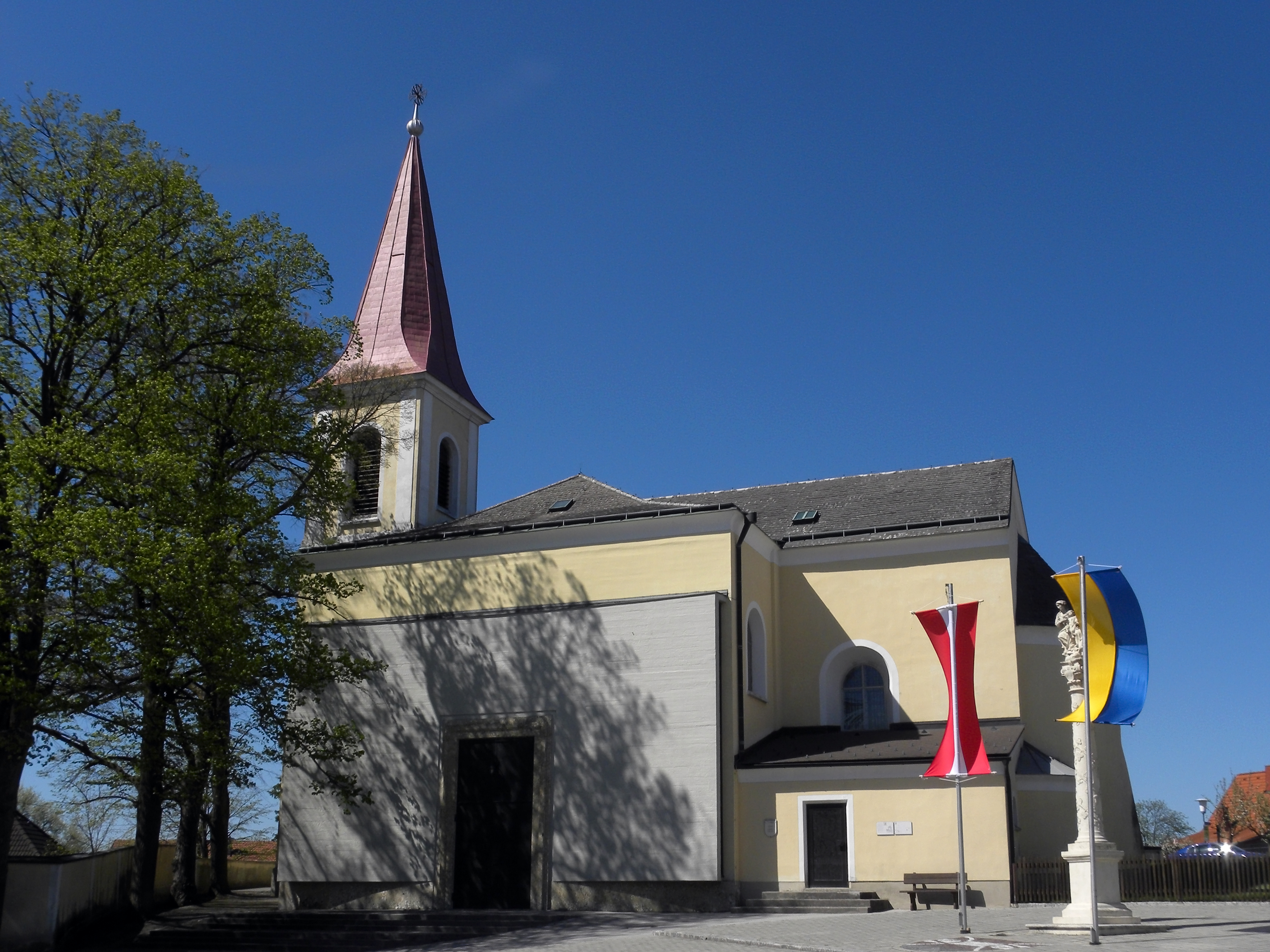
- Hochwolkersdorf parish church

- Coat of arms

- Location within Austria Hochwolkersdorf (Austria)
- Coordinates: 47°39′37″N 16°16′56″E
- Country: Austria
- State: Lower Austria
- District: Wiener Neustadt-Land

Government
  - Mayor: Waltraud Gruber (SPÖ)

Area
  - Total: 23.54 km^{2} (9.09 sq mi)
- Elevation: 630 m (2,070 ft)

Population (2018-01-01)
  - Total: 1,004
  - Density: 42.65/km^{2} (110.5/sq mi)
- Time zone: UTC+1 (CET)
  - Summer (DST): UTC+2 (CEST)
- Postal code: 2802
- Area code: 02645
- Vehicle registration: WB
- Website: www.hochwolkersdorf.at

Hochwolkersdorf is a municipality in the district of Wiener Neustadt-Land in the Austrian state of Lower Austria.

== Population ==
Historical population
Year	Pop.	±%
1869	995	—
1880	1,133	+13.9%
1890	1,143	+0.9%
1900	1,141	−0.2%
1910	1,273	+11.6%
1923	1,171	−8.0%
1934	1,058	−9.6%
1939	966	−8.7%
1951	928	−3.9%
1961	871	−6.1%
1971	989	+13.5%
1981	1,033	+4.4%
1991	1,029	−0.4%
2001	1,045	+1.6%
2011	1,016	−2.8%
