= Forchtenstein =

- Municipality
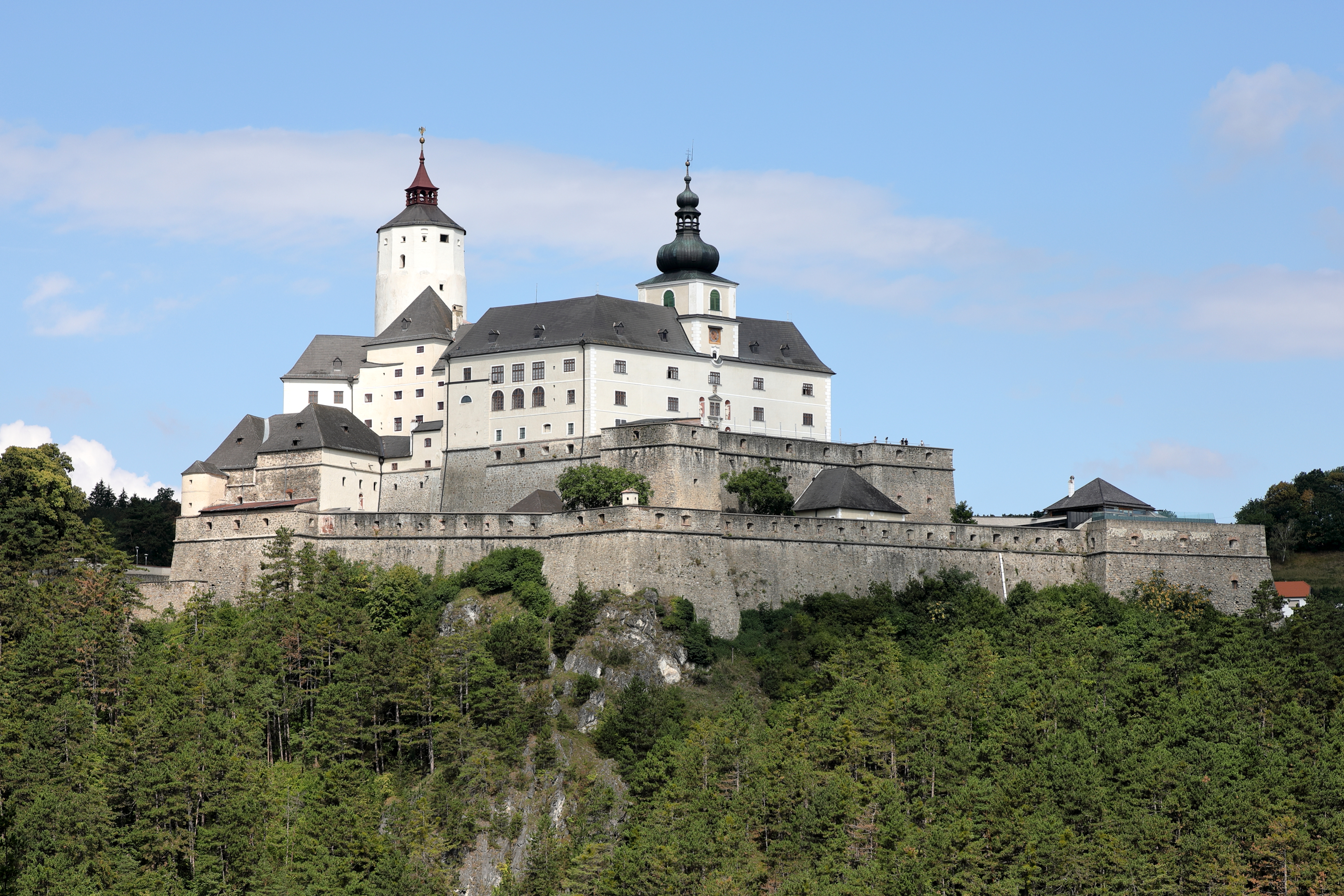

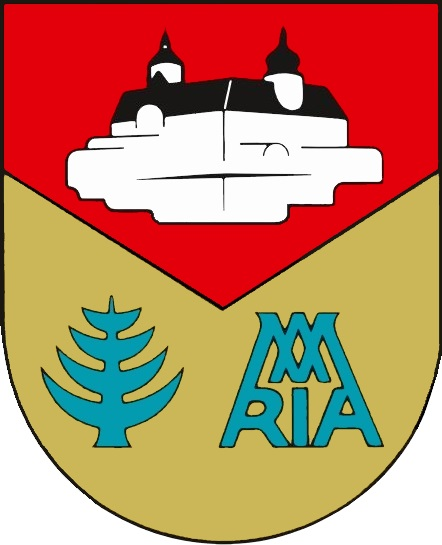
- Coat of arms

- Location within Burgenland Location within Austria
- Coordinates: 47°43′N 16°20′E
- Country: Austria
- State: Burgenland
- District: Mattersburg

Government
  - Mayor: Friederike Reismüller

Area
  - Total: 16.59 km^{2} (6.41 sq mi)
- Elevation: 343 m (1,125 ft)

Population (2018-01-01)
  - Total: 2,796
  - Density: 168.5/km^{2} (436.5/sq mi)
- Time zone: UTC+1 (CET)
  - Summer (DST): UTC+2 (CEST)
- Postal code: 7212
- Website: www.gemeindeforchtenstein.at

Forchtenstein (Hungarian: Fraknóváralja or Fraknókő, Croatian: Fortnavski grad; until 1972, Forchtenau, Fraknó, Fortnava) is a town in the district of Mattersburg in the Austrian state of Burgenland. It is the location of Forchtenstein Castle, one of the many palaces of the famous Esterházy family.

It consists of two subdivisions (Katastralgemeinden) which were formerly separate towns: Forchtenau (Hungarian: Fraknó) and Neustift an der Rosalia (Hungarian: Újtelek).

== Population ==
Historical population
Year	Pop.	±%
1869	1,685	—
1880	1,732	+2.8%
1890	1,816	+4.8%
1900	2,054	+13.1%
1910	2,158	+5.1%
1923	2,127	−1.4%
1934	2,213	+4.0%
1939	2,223	+0.5%
1951	2,184	−1.8%
1961	2,363	+8.2%
1971	2,502	+5.9%
1981	2,557	+2.2%
1991	2,678	+4.7%
2001	2,832	+5.8%
2011	2,845	+0.5%

The castle gained a nickname as the "Castle of Fear". The castle has one red and one black tower. The castle boasted many torture chambers including one called the Pit of Oblivion, a deep pit where torture victims would be strung upside down and deprived of food and water until they died. The Pit of Oblivion is located in the black tower. Although many of the rooms are now available to the public either for rental or visitation, the treasure room of the castle still remains private and inaccessible.

== Gallery ==
Sculpture at Esterházy Castle

At Esterházy Castle

At Esterházy Castle

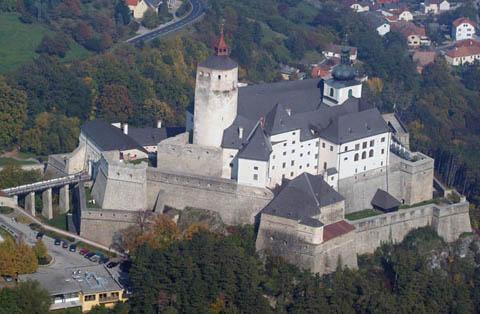
Aerial photograph of the castle
