= Zemendorf-Stöttera =

- Municipality
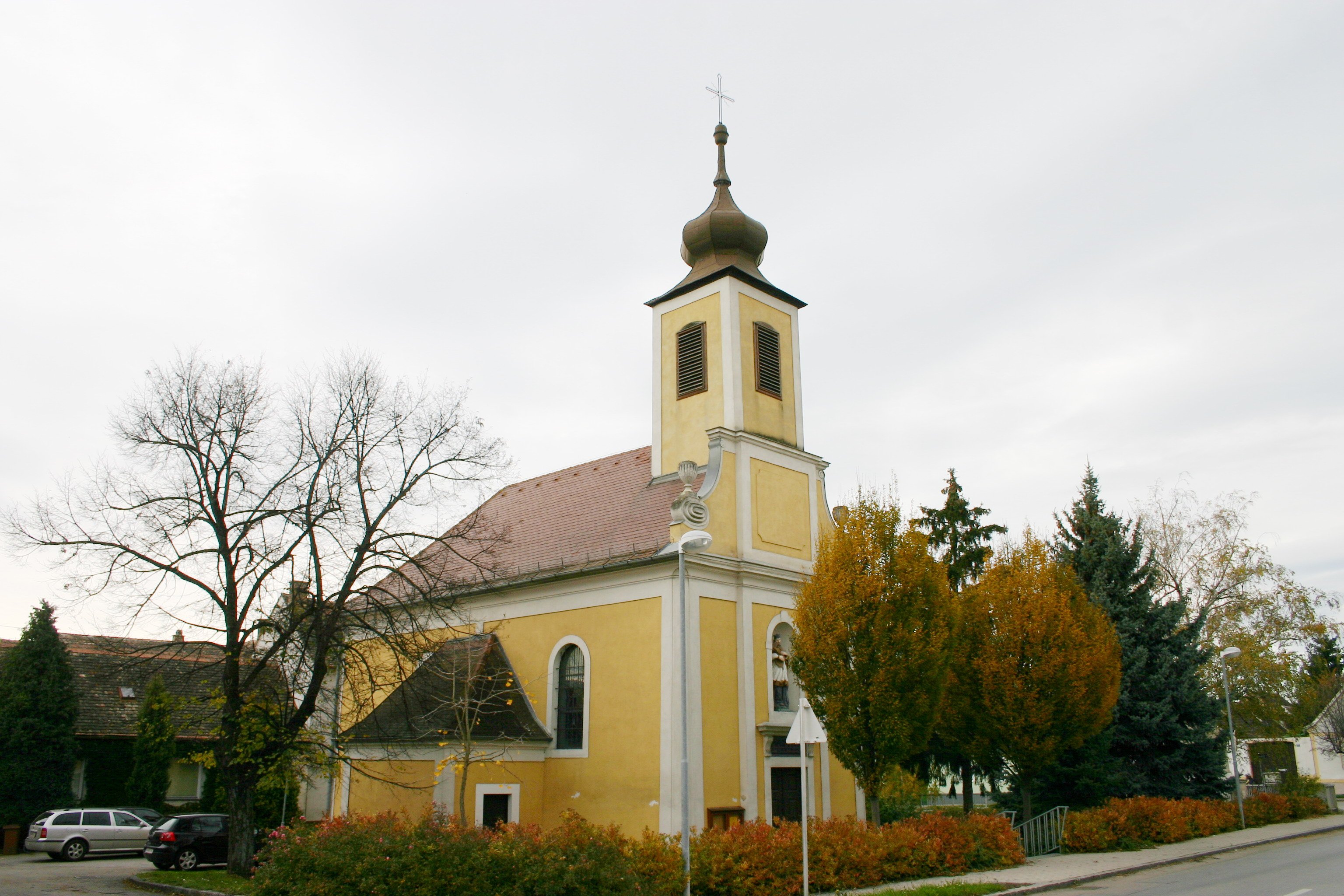
- Catholic church in Zemendorf

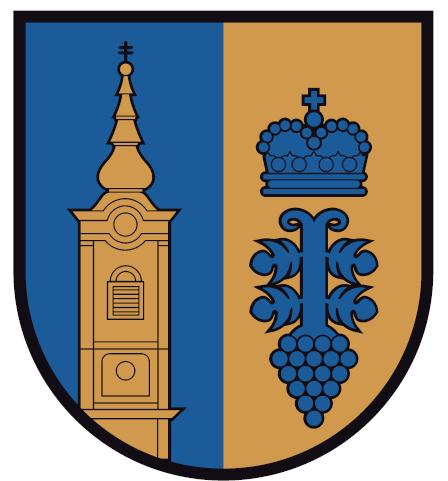
- Coat of arms

- Location within Austria
- Coordinates: 47°46′N 16°27′E
- Country: Austria
- State: Burgenland
- District: Mattersburg

Government
  - Mayor: Josef Haider

Area
  - Total: 12.83 km^{2} (4.95 sq mi)
- Elevation: 198 m (650 ft)

Population (2018-01-01)
  - Total: 1,268
  - Density: 98.83/km^{2} (256.0/sq mi)
- Time zone: UTC+1 (CET)
  - Summer (DST): UTC+2 (CEST)
- Postal code: 7023
- Website: www.zemendorf-stoettera.at

Zemendorf-Stöttera (Hungarian: Zemenye-Selegd; Croatian: Cemendrof-Štetr (Štedra, Stodra)) is a town in the district of Mattersburg in the Austrian state of Burgenland.

== Geography ==
It consists of two parts, Zemendorf and Stöttera, both of which lie on the River Wulka downstream from Pöttelsdorf and upstream from Antau.

== History ==
Until 1926, Stöttera was called Stöttern.

== Population ==
Historical population
Year	Pop.	±%
1869	1,562	—
1880	1,674	+7.2%
1890	1,800	+7.5%
1900	1,745	−3.1%
1910	1,654	−5.2%
1923	1,562	−5.6%
1934	1,541	−1.3%
1939	1,489	−3.4%
1951	1,402	−5.8%
1961	1,315	−6.2%
1971	1,321	+0.5%
1981	1,282	−3.0%
1991	1,223	−4.6%
2001	1,272	+4.0%
2011	1,297	+2.0%
