= Lars Müller-Marienburg =

German-Austrian prelate (born 1977)

The Right Reverend Lars Müller-Marienburg
- Superintendent of Lower Austria
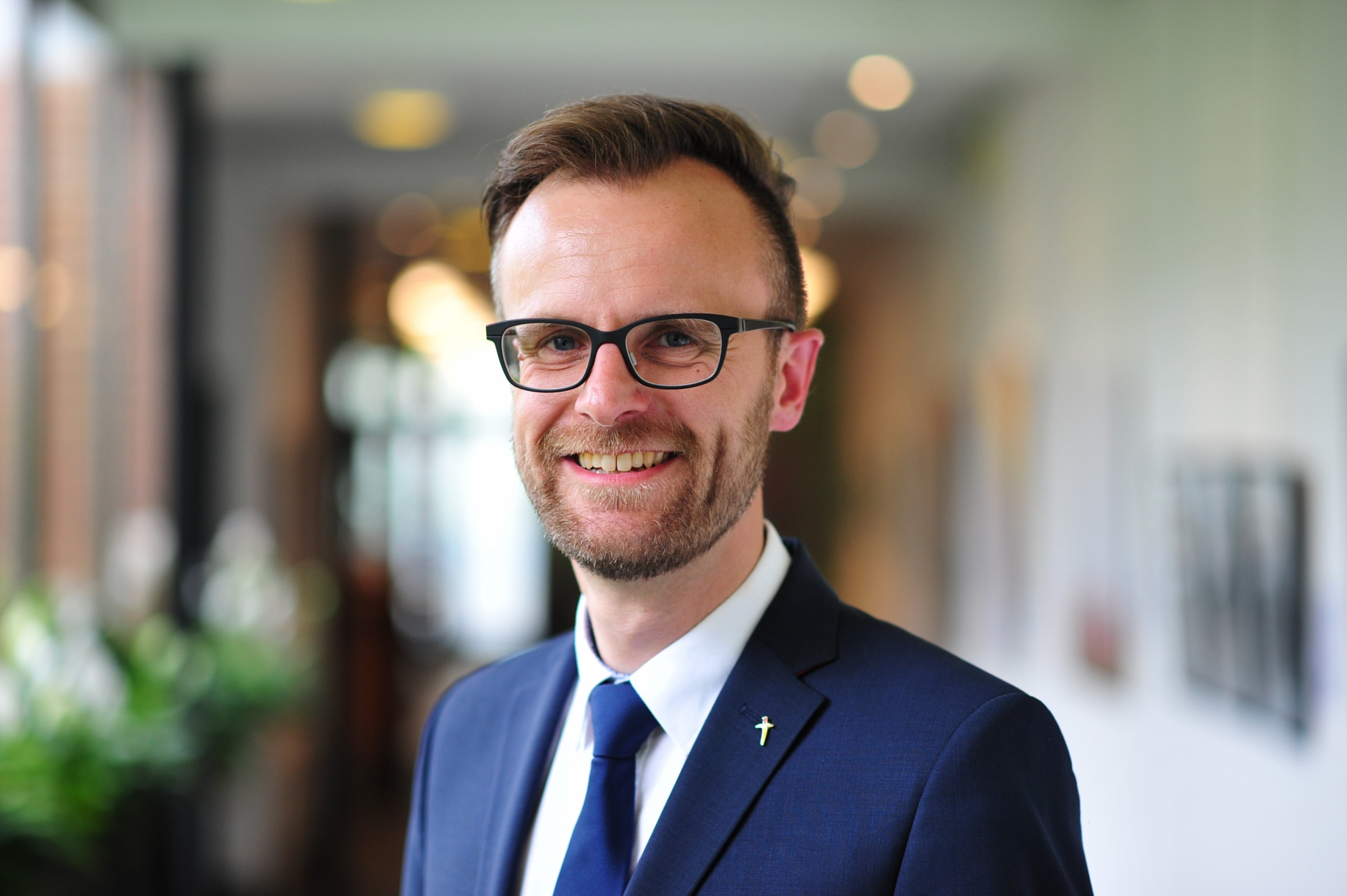
- Church: Evangelical Church of the Augsburg Confession in Austria
- Diocese: Lower Austria
- Elected: June 2016
- Installed: 2016
- Predecessor: Paul Weiland

Orders
- Ordination: 2010
- Consecration: 15 October 2016 by Michael Bünker

Personal details
- Born: 1977 (age 48–49) Ansbach, Bavaria, West Germany
- Denomination: Lutheran

Lars Müller-Marienburg (born 1977) is a German-Austrian prelate who is the former Superintendent of the Diocese of Lower Austria in the Evangelical Church of the Augsburg Confession in Austria.

== Biography ==
Müller-Marienburg was born in Ansbach, Bavaria, West Germany in 1977. His family originated from the Transylvanian town of Feldioara (Marienburg, in German). His grandfather was responsible for adding the surname Marienburg to Müller in the 1950s as a reminder of the family's home city. His mother was a primary school teacher and his father a doctor. He also has three siblings.

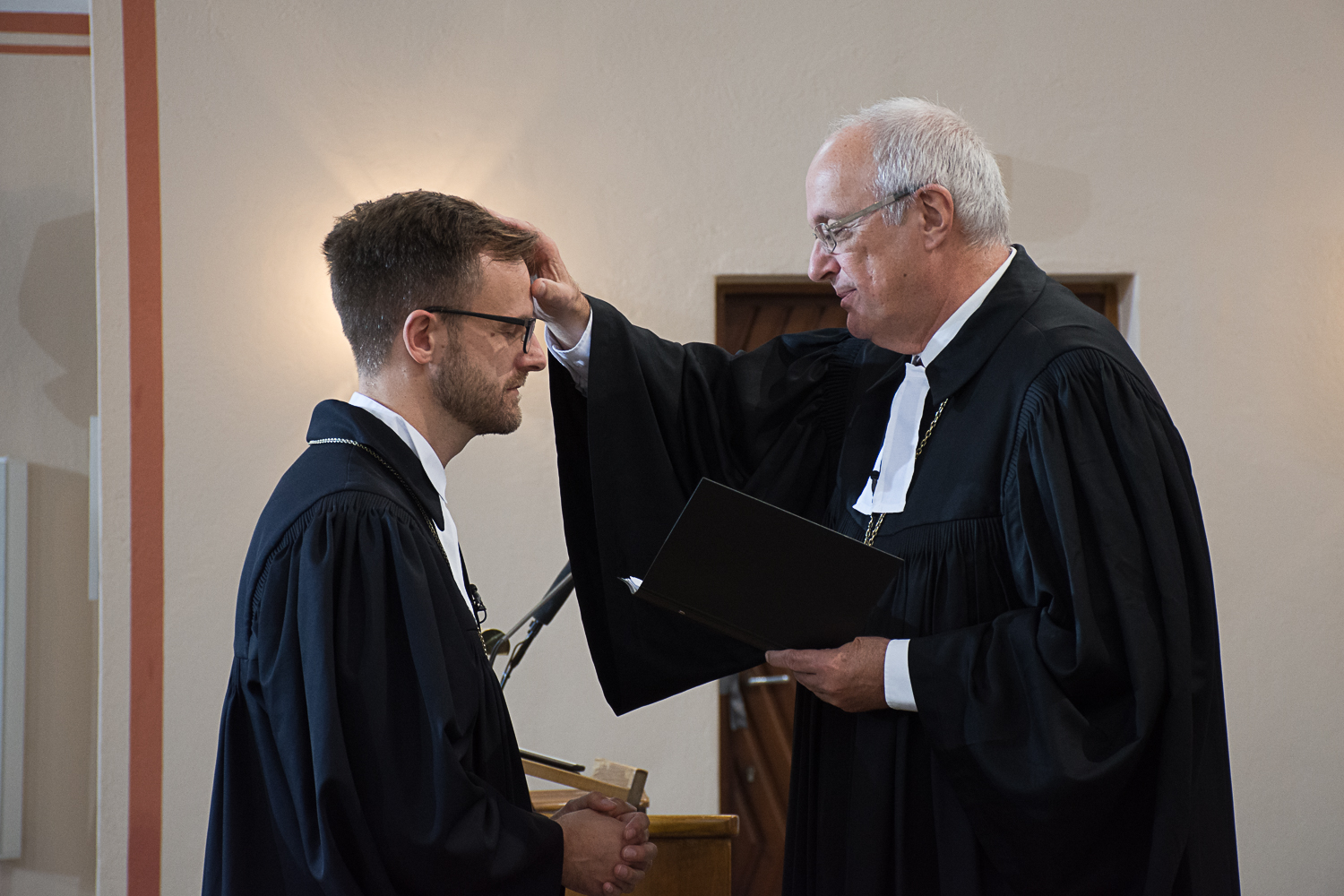
Consecration of Lars Müller-Marienburg by Bishop Michael Bünker.

When he was 18, he went to Canada for a year in a spiritual school. Müller-Marienburg studied law and later studied at the Protestant Theology School at LMU Munich. He graduated in 2007 and was enrolled in the Vicarate, which is a step for a Protestant candidate for ordained pastoral ministry. He spent his Vicariate in Linz and in Pöttelsdorf. In 2010, he was ordained priest and became pastor of the Protestant parish of Innsbruck-Auferstehungskirche. In 2011, he delivered a sermon in Innsbruck Cathedral on the occasion of the Week of Prayer for Christian Unity.

In June 2016, Müller-Marienburg was elected in the fifth round of elections as the successor of Paul Weiland, who died in 2015, as Superintendent of the Diocese of Lower Austria, with 47 of the 70 votes. He was consecrated on 15 October 2016 by bishop Michael Bünker in the Church of the Resurrection in Wiener Neustadt. The consecration was attended by the provincial governor Erwin Pröll and Helmut Krätzl, the auxiliary bishop emeritus of Vienna.

Müller-Marienburg is the first superintendent of the Evangelical Church of the Augsburg Confession in Austria who is openly gay.
