= Sigleß =

- Municipality
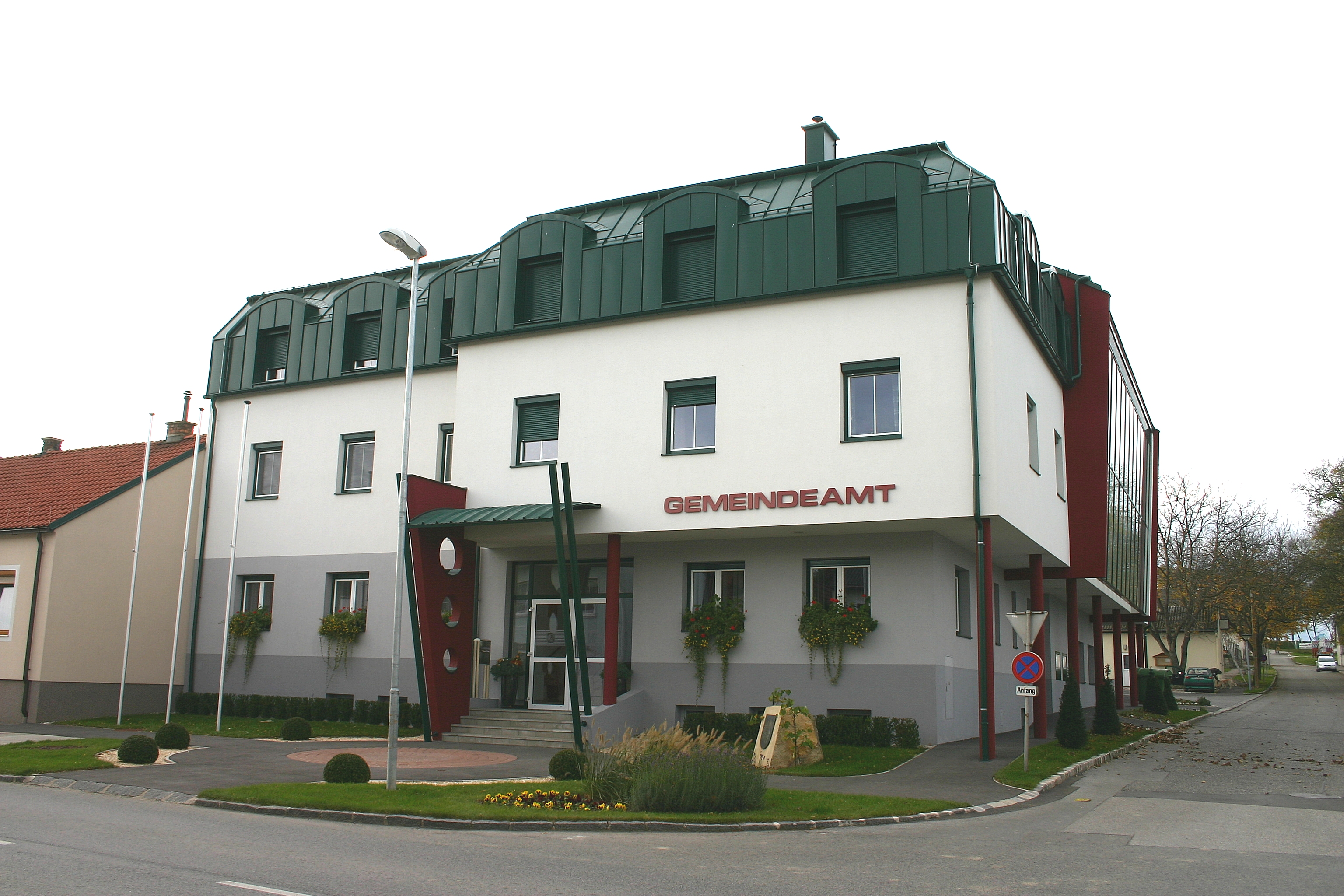
- The municipal office of Sigleß

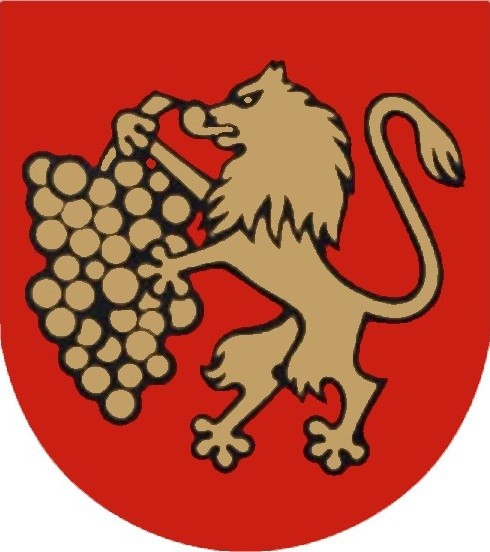
- Coat of arms

- Location within Austria
- Coordinates: 47°47′N 16°24′E
- Country: Austria
- State: Burgenland
- District: Mattersburg

Government
  - Mayor: Josef Kutrovats

Area
  - Total: 10.16 km^{2} (3.92 sq mi)
- Elevation: 207 m (679 ft)

Population (2018-01-01)
  - Total: 1,183
  - Density: 116.4/km^{2} (301.6/sq mi)
- Time zone: UTC+1 (CET)
  - Summer (DST): UTC+2 (CEST)
- Postal code: 7032
- Website: www.sigless.at

Sigleß (until 1937, Siegleß; Hungarian: Siklósd or Siklós; Croatian: Cikleš) is a village in the district of Mattersburg in the Austrian state of Burgenland. The village is a part of the Naturpark Rosalia-Kogelberg.

== Population ==
Historical population
Year	Pop.	±%
1869	1,181	—
1880	1,244	+5.3%
1890	1,234	−0.8%
1900	1,361	+10.3%
1910	1,499	+10.1%
1923	1,471	−1.9%
1934	1,329	−9.7%
1939	1,240	−6.7%
1951	1,194	−3.7%
1961	1,131	−5.3%
1971	1,108	−2.0%
1981	1,039	−6.2%
1991	1,052	+1.3%
2001	1,148	+9.1%
2011	1,135	−1.1%
