= Rohrbach bei Mattersburg =

- Municipality
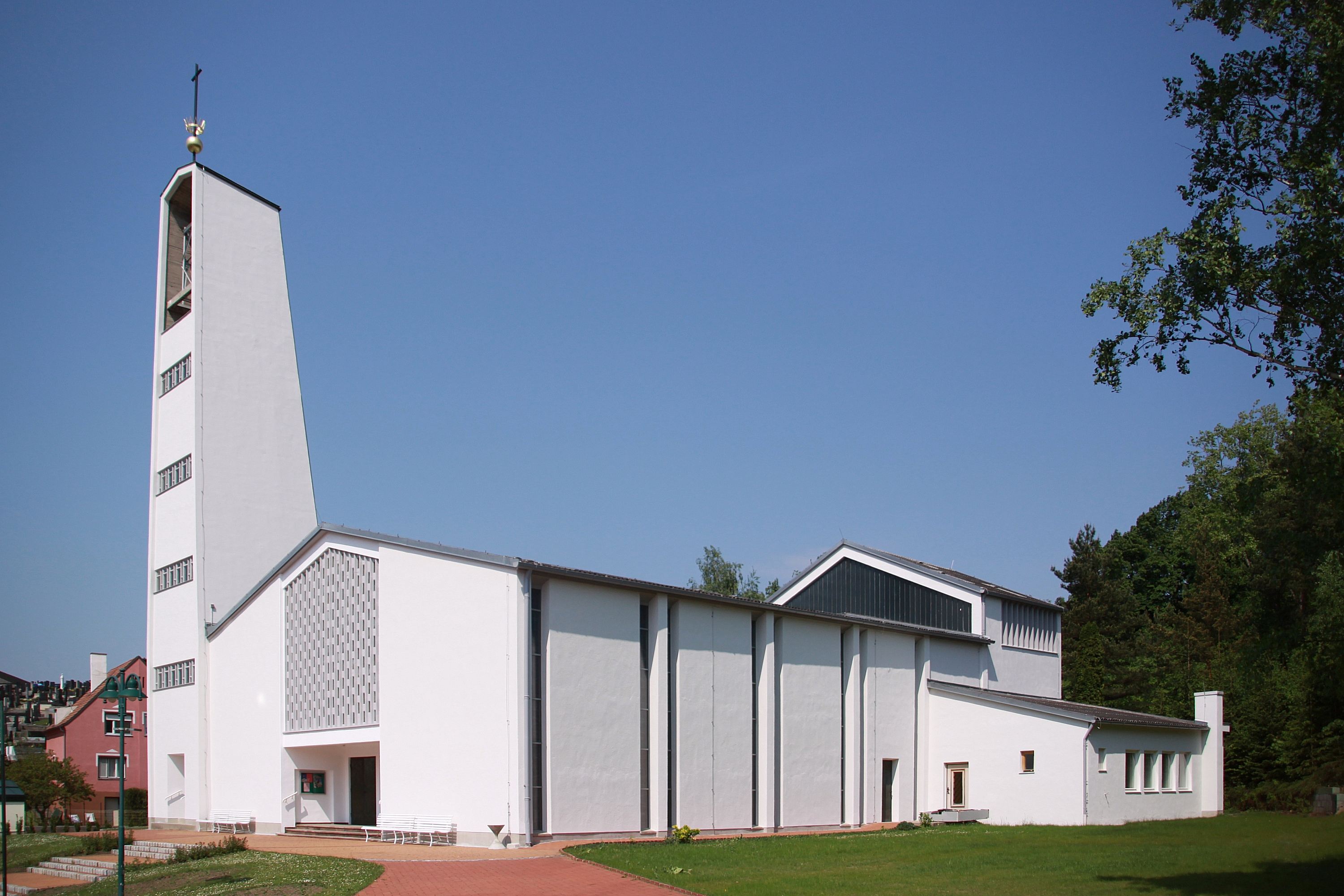
- Rohrbach bei Mattersburg parish church

- Coat of arms

- Location within Austria
- Coordinates: 47°43′N 16°26′E
- Country: Austria
- State: Burgenland
- District: Mattersburg

Government
  - Mayor: Alfred Reismüller

Area
  - Total: 15.23 km^{2} (5.88 sq mi)
- Elevation: 266 m (873 ft)

Population (2018-01-01)
  - Total: 2,707
  - Density: 177.7/km^{2} (460.3/sq mi)
- Time zone: UTC+1 (CET)
  - Summer (DST): UTC+2 (CEST)
- Postal code: 7222
- Website: www.rohrbach-bm.at

Rohrbach bei Mattersburg (Hungarian: Fraknónádasd, Fraknó-Nádasd, Croatian: Orbuh [orbux]) is a town in the district of Mattersburg in the Austrian state of Burgenland.

== Population ==
Historical population
Year	Pop.	±%
1869	1,451	—
1880	1,530	+5.4%
1890	1,579	+3.2%
1900	1,767	+11.9%
1910	2,099	+18.8%
1923	2,088	−0.5%
1934	2,247	+7.6%
1939	2,211	−1.6%
1951	2,218	+0.3%
1961	2,300	+3.7%
1971	2,551	+10.9%
1981	2,584	+1.3%
1991	2,669	+3.3%
2001	2,718	+1.8%
2011	2,721	+0.1%
