= Protestant Church of the Augsburg Confession in Austria =

Lutheran church in Austria

- Evangelische Kirche Augsburgischen Bekenntnisses in Österreich
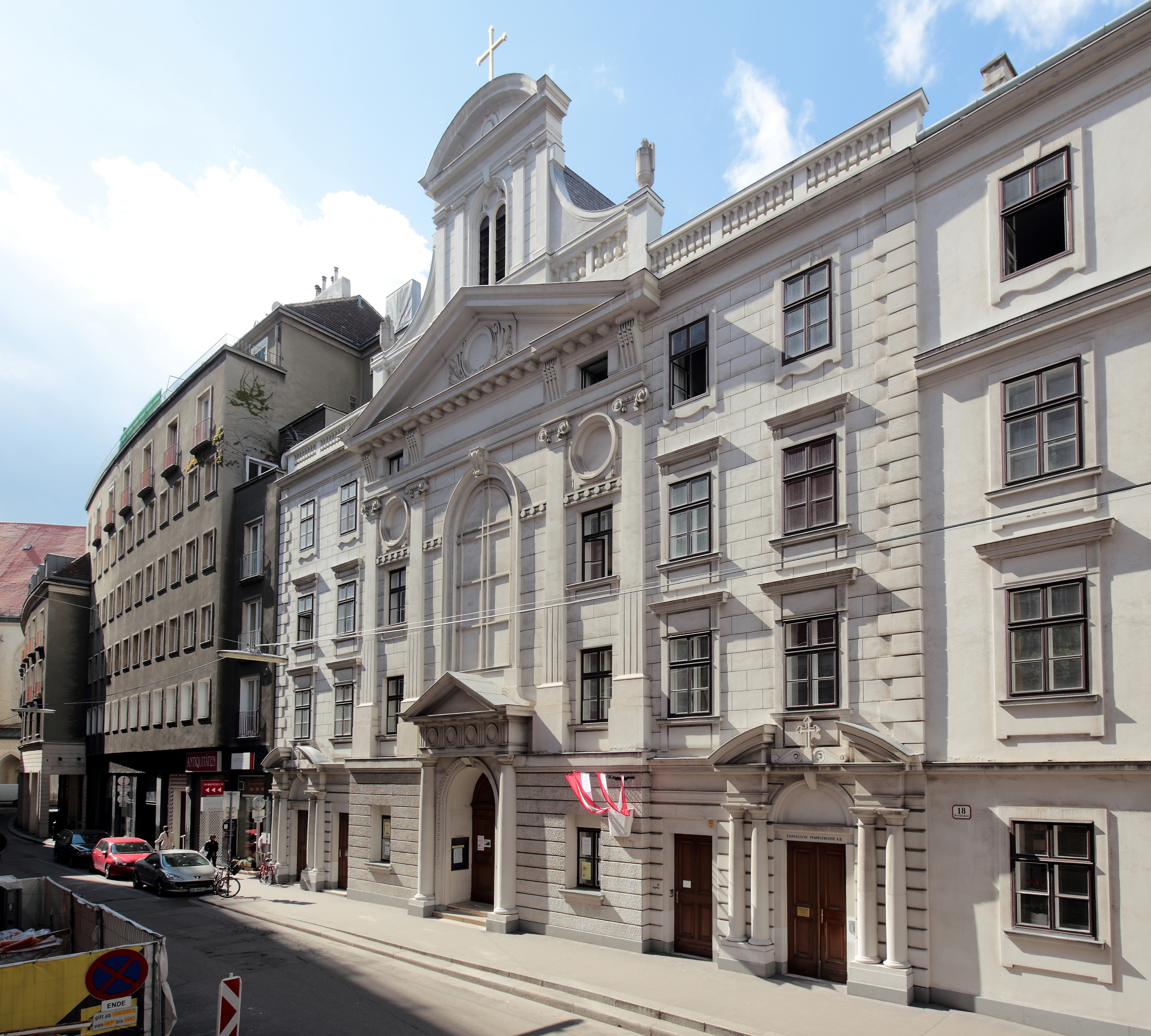
- The Lutheran Church in Vienna
- Classification: Protestant
- Orientation: Lutheran
- Polity: presbyteral-synodal
- Bishop: Cornelia Richter
- Associations: Lutheran World Federation, World Council of Churches, Conference of European Churches, Community of Protestant Churches in Europe
- Region: Austria
- Headquarters: Vienna, Austria
- Origin: 16th century
- Separated from: Catholic Church
- Congregations: 191
- Members: 244,583 (2023)
- Official website: https://evang.at/

The Protestant Church of the Augsburg Confession in Austria (Evangelische Kirche Augsburgischen Bekenntnisses in Österreich) is a Lutheran denomination in Austria. It is a member of the Lutheran World Federation, which it joined in 1947. It is also a member of the World Council of Churches, the Conference of European Churches and the Community of Protestant Churches in Europe as well as the Conference of Churches on the Rhine.

== Structure ==
The Protestant Church of the Augsburg Confession in Austria is headed by a bishop – currently Cornelia Richter. The church consists of seven dioceses, each headed by a superintendent. These superintendencies are broadly aligned territorially with the federal states of the Republic of Austria.

Diocese	Founded	Cathedral	Superintendent
Diocese of Burgenland	1924	Resurrection Church (Eisenstadt)	Robert Jonischkeit (2021– )
Diocese of Carinthia and East Tyrol	1947	Church in Stadtpark (Villach)	Manfred Sauer (2002– )
Diocese of Lower Austria	1947	St Pölten Parish church (Sankt Pölten)	Lars Müller-Marienburg (2016– )
Diocese of Upper Austria	1783	Martin Luther Church (Linz)	Gerold Lehner (2005– )
Diocese of Salzburg and Tyrol	1966	Christchurch (Innsbruck)	Olivier Dantine (2012– )
Diocese of Styria	1947	Heilandskirche (Graz)	Wolfgang Rehner (2018– )
Diocese of Vienna	1783	Lutheran City Church (Vienna)	Matthias Geist (2018– )

== Social issues ==
Since 2009, the Protestant Church in Austria has been an advocate of gay rights and endorsed the introduction of civil partnerships for same-sex couples. Additionally, the church permits and supports blessing services for same-sex couples to celebrate their civil union.
