= Thomas Borenitsch =

Austrian football goalkeeper

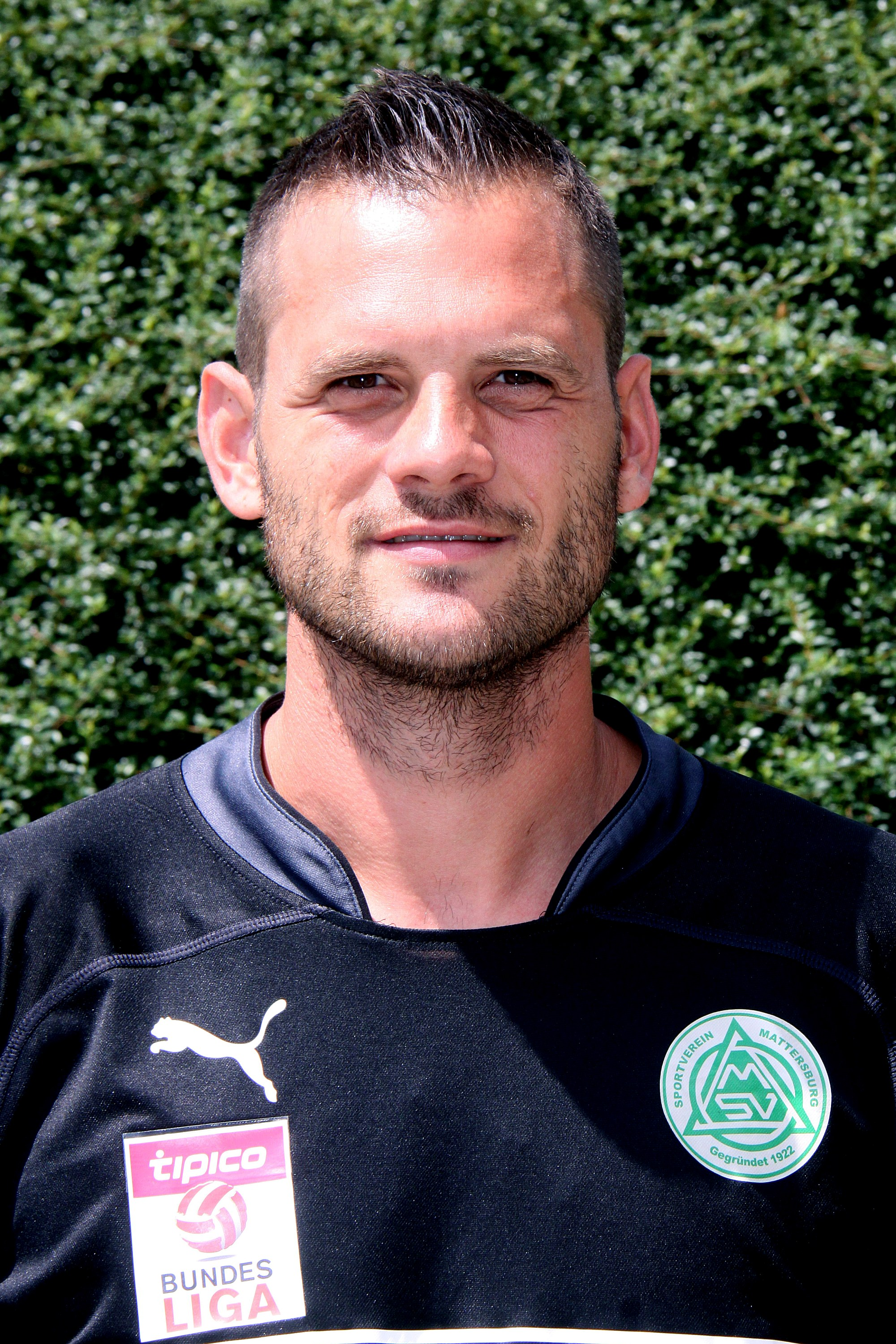

Personal information
- Full name: Thomas Borenitsch
- Date of birth: 19 December 1980 (age 45)
- Place of birth: Antau, Austria
- Height: 1.93 m (6 ft 4 in)
- Position: Goalkeeper

Team information
- Current team: SV Mattersburg
- Number: 1

Youth career
- 1988–1996: SV Antau

Senior career*
Years	Team	Apps	(Gls)
2000–	SV Mattersburg	225	(0)
- * Club domestic league appearances and goals as of 00:08, 3 January 2016 (UTC)

Thomas Borenitsch (born 19 December 1980) is an Austrian football goalkeeper currently playing for Austrian Football Bundesliga side SV Mattersburg.
