= Loipersbach im Burgenland =

- Municipality
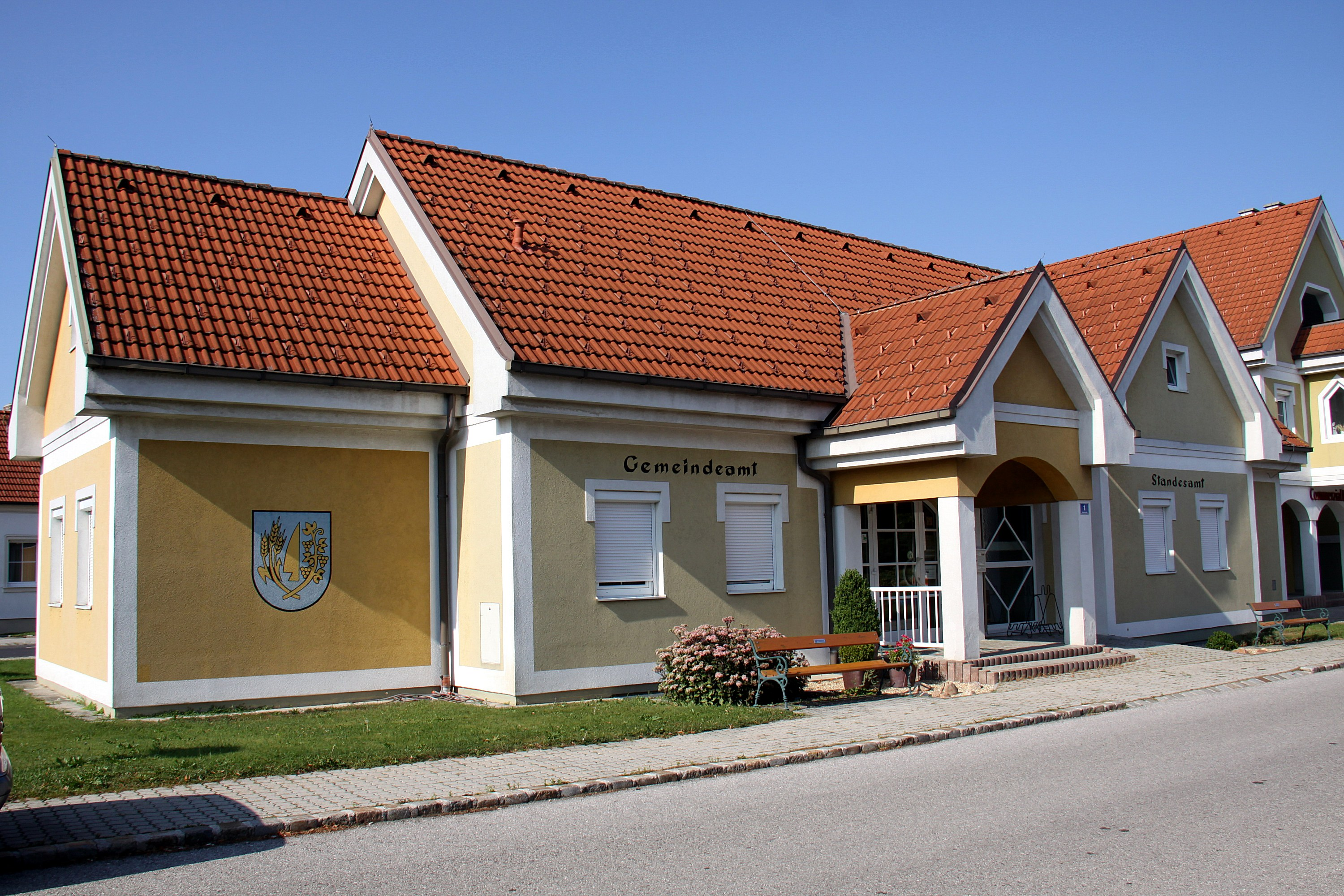
- Municipal office

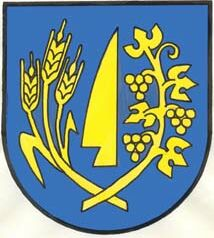
- Coat of arms

- Location within Austria
- Coordinates: 47°42′N 16°28′E
- Country: Austria
- State: Burgenland
- District: Mattersburg

Government
  - Mayor: Erhard Aminger (SPÖ)

Area
  - Total: 8.54 km^{2} (3.30 sq mi)
- Elevation: 292 m (958 ft)

Population (2018-01-01)
  - Total: 1,229
  - Density: 144/km^{2} (373/sq mi)
- Time zone: UTC+1 (CET)
  - Summer (DST): UTC+2 (CEST)
- Postal code: 7020
- Area code: +43 2686
- Website: www.loipersbach.info

Loipersbach im Burgenland (Hungarian: Lépesfalva) is a town in the district of Mattersburg in the Austrian state of Burgenland.

== Population ==
Historical population
Year	Pop.	±%
1869	600	—
1880	652	+8.7%
1890	704	+8.0%
1900	842	+19.6%
1910	911	+8.2%
1923	975	+7.0%
1934	1,080	+10.8%
1939	1,038	−3.9%
1951	1,194	+15.0%
1961	1,144	−4.2%
1971	1,142	−0.2%
1981	1,136	−0.5%
1991	1,158	+1.9%
2001	1,269	+9.6%
2011	1,255	−1.1%
