= Hirm =

- Municipality
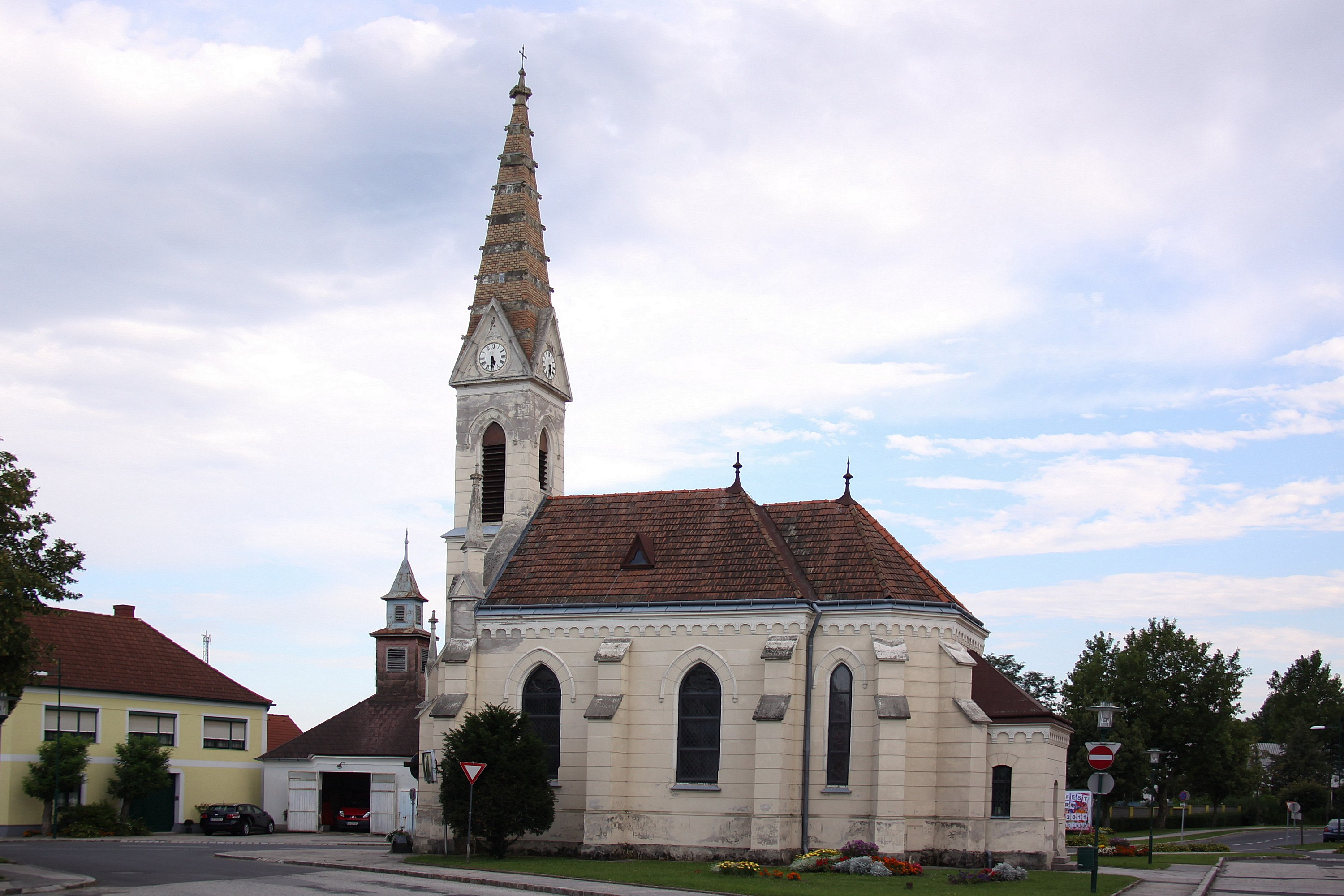
- Hirm parish church

- Coat of arms

- Location within Austria
- Coordinates: 47°47′N 16°27′E
- Country: Austria
- State: Burgenland
- District: Mattersburg

Government
  - Mayor: Christian Wöhl

Area
  - Total: 3.12 km^{2} (1.20 sq mi)
- Elevation: 183 m (600 ft)

Population (2018-01-01)
  - Total: 1,009
  - Density: 323/km^{2} (838/sq mi)
- Time zone: UTC+1 (CET)
  - Summer (DST): UTC+2 (CEST)
- Postal code: 7024

Hirm (German pronunciation: [hɪʁm]; Hungarian: Félszerfalva, earlier, Hungarian: Félszerfalu; Croatian: Hirman or Hirin) is a town in the district of Mattersburg in the Austrian state of Burgenland. It lies on the Hirmer Bach, a tributary of the River Wulka, downstream from Krensdorf.

== Population ==
Historical population
Year	Pop.	±%
1869	455	—
1880	575	+26.4%
1890	640	+11.3%
1900	729	+13.9%
1910	831	+14.0%
1923	907	+9.1%
1934	978	+7.8%
1939	961	−1.7%
1951	930	−3.2%
1961	833	−10.4%
1971	812	−2.5%
1981	810	−0.2%
1991	843	+4.1%
2001	907	+7.6%
2011	958	+5.6%
