= Marz, Austria =

Marz
- Municipality
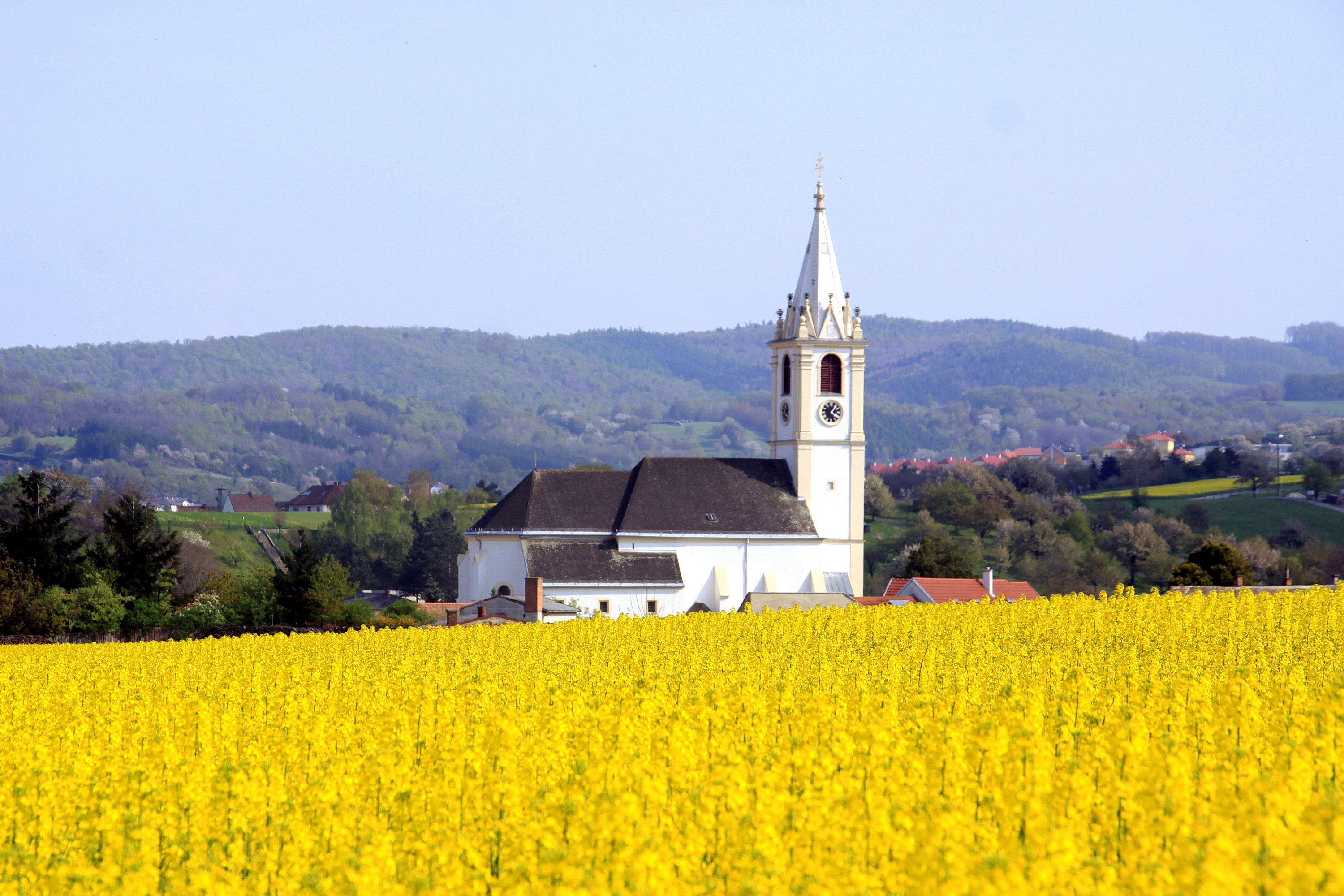
- Marz parish church

- Coat of arms

- Location within Austria Marz (Austria)
- Coordinates: 47°43′N 16°25′E
- Country: Austria
- State: Burgenland
- District: Mattersburg

Government
  - Mayor: Otto Scheiber

Area
  - Total: 17.4 km^{2} (6.7 sq mi)
- Elevation: 252 m (827 ft)

Population (2018-01-01)
  - Total: 2,073
  - Density: 119/km^{2} (309/sq mi)
- Time zone: UTC+1 (CET)
  - Summer (DST): UTC+2 (CEST)
- Postal code: 7221
- Website: www.marz.eu

Marz (Hungarian: Márcfalva, Márczfalva, Márc, Márcz, Croatian: Marca) is a town in the district of Mattersburg in the Austrian state of Burgenland.

== Population ==
Historical population
Year	Pop.	±%
1869	1,401	—
1880	1,461	+4.3%
1890	1,527	+4.5%
1900	1,666	+9.1%
1910	1,828	+9.7%
1923	1,862	+1.9%
1934	1,915	+2.8%
1939	1,800	−6.0%
1951	1,777	−1.3%
1961	1,844	+3.8%
1971	1,863	+1.0%
1981	1,550	−16.8%
1991	1,889	+21.9%
2001	2,028	+7.4%
2011	1,978	−2.5%
