= Antau =

- Municipality
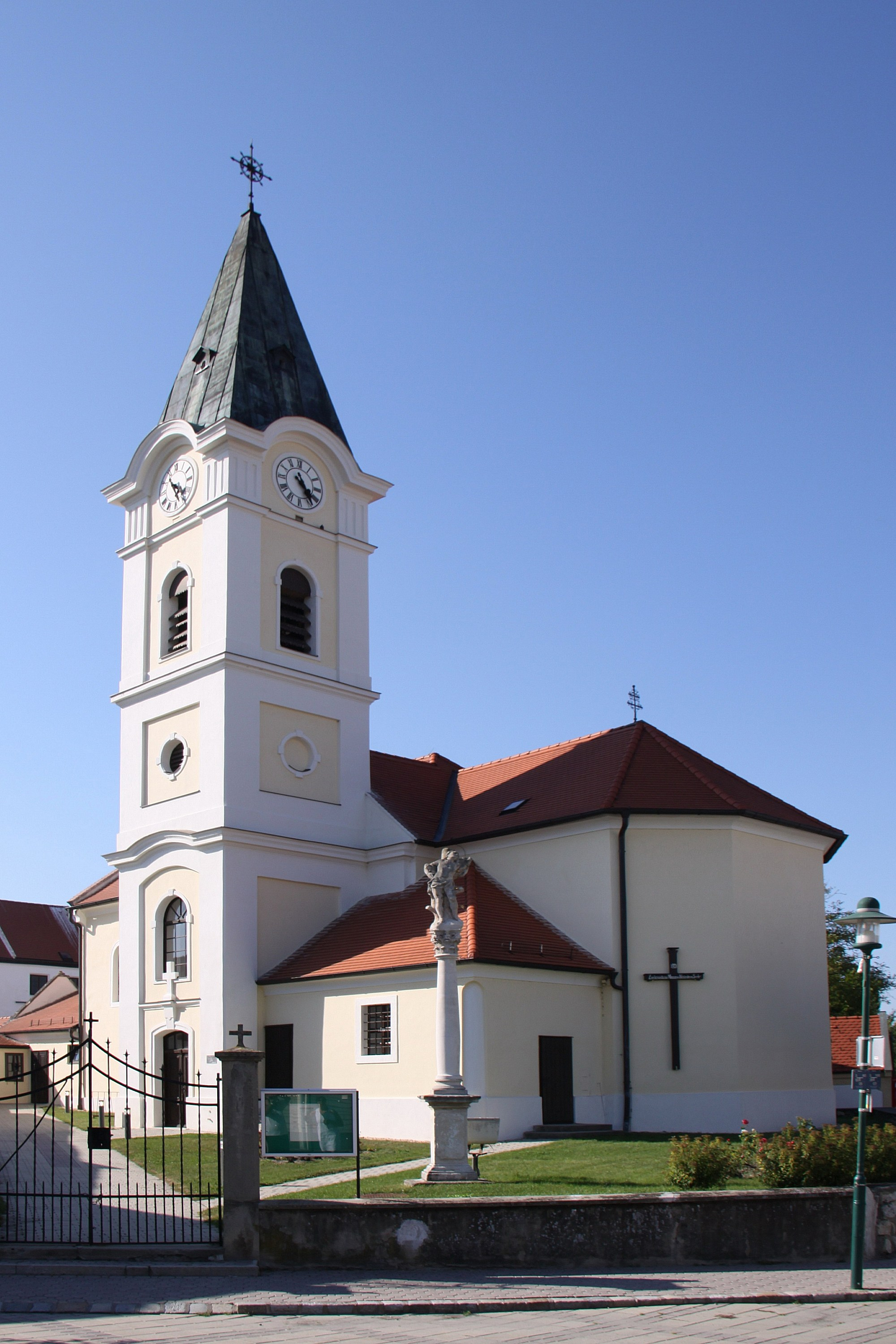
- Antau parish church

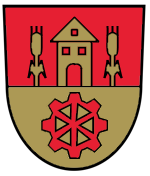
- Coat of arms

- Location within Austria
- Coordinates: 47°46′N 16°29′E
- Country: Austria
- State: Burgenland
- District: Mattersburg

Government
  - Mayor: Frank Wiemer (ÖVP)

Area
  - Total: 8.75 km^{2} (3.38 sq mi)
- Elevation: 189 m (620 ft)
- Highest elevation: 239 m (784 ft)
- Lowest elevation: 170 m (560 ft)

Population (31 December 2025)
  - Total: 842
  - Density: 96.2/km^{2} (249/sq mi)
- Time zone: UTC+1 (CET)
  - Summer (DST): UTC+2 (CEST)
- Postal code: 7042
- Area code: +43 2687
- Website: https://www.antau.gv.at

Antau (German pronunciation: [ˈantaʊ̯], Hungarian: Selegszántó, Seleg-Szántó, Croatian: Otava) is a municipality in the Mattersburg district in the Austrian state of Burgenland. Lying in the Wulka valley, it had 842 inhabitants at the end of 2025 and is home to a significant Burgenland Croat minority alongside a German-speaking majority; the village maintains a local branch of the largest Burgenland Croat cultural association and an associated tamburitza ensemble, and operates bilingual German–Croatian kindergarten and primary schools.

First documented in 1245, Antau was originally a Hungarian-settled village whose name derives from the Hungarian Szántó ("ploughed field"). The area had earlier been settled during the Celtic and Roman periods, and the remains of a Roman-era villa rustica at the municipality's eastern edge have been individually protected as a monument since 2016. Through the medieval era the village was divided among several manorial lords, and in the early 16th century much of its population was lost during Ottoman military campaigns; Croatian settlers were subsequently brought in to prevent the village's abandonment, establishing the mixed German–Croatian character it retains today. Along with the rest of Burgenland, Antau remained part of the Kingdom of Hungary until 1921, when it became part of Austria. After suffering losses in both world wars, the village was merged with the neighbouring municipality of Hirm in 1971 under a statewide municipal restructuring law, a move that met vocal local opposition, including a tractor protest outside the state parliament in Eisenstadt; Antau regained its independence in 1991.

The St. Andrew parish church, whose current building dates largely to an 1809–1810 reconstruction and an 1854 rebuilding after fires, is the village's principal landmark; it is one of eleven individually protected heritage objects listed by the Federal Monuments Office in the municipality. Antau's municipal coat of arms, granted in 1991, depicts a tower and ears of grain above a mill-wheel, symbols drawn from the village's grain-growing economy and its former mills on the Wulka. Antau received a bronze award in the village category of Entente Florale Europe in 2002. Historically an agricultural village, its economy shifted over the 20th century toward commuting to nearby urban centres; as of late 2024 the municipality had 72 registered business establishments. The municipal council has been governed by the ÖVP since Antau's re-establishment as an independent municipality in 1991, with Frank Wiemer serving as mayor since 2022. The village's football club, Sportvereinigung Antau, was founded in 1930, and the former Austrian Bundesliga goalkeeper Thomas Borenitsch was raised in Antau and began his career at the club.

== Etymology ==
The origin of the placename Antau reflects the settlement's early Hungarian population. The village's Hungarian name derived from Szántó, meaning "ploughed field" or "tilled land", reflecting a pattern common to originally Hungarian-settled placenames in eastern Austria between 800 and 1200, in which the initial Hungarian s sound was rendered in German as ts. This initial consonant was later reanalysed as the Middle High German preposition ze ("at"), leaving Antau as the apparent standalone name. The Burgenland municipality of Andau, in the Seewinkel, shares the same etymological origin, though the two villages are unrelated in location. To distinguish it from Andau, the modern Hungarian form of the name, reflecting Antau's position on the Wulka, is Selegszántó. The Croatian name of the village is Otava.

== Geography ==
Antau lies in the Wulka valley in the Austrian state of Burgenland, directly on the Wulka, the only river that flows into Lake Neusiedl. The municipality lies at an elevation of 189 metres and consists of a single settlement and cadastral community of the same name; Antau is the only locality within the municipal area. The municipal territory covers approximately 875 hectares (8.75 km^{2}), with elevations ranging from about 170 metres at its lowest point to 239 metres at its highest. It is situated in the district of Mattersburg, within the wider Eisenstadt region of northern Burgenland. Neighbouring municipalities include Hirm, with which Antau was administratively merged between 1971 and 1991 (see § 20th century), and Wulkaprodersdorf, whose railway station partly lies on Antau's cadastral territory (see § Economy and infrastructure).

=== Climate ===
Antau lies in a transitional climate zone characteristic of eastern Austria, with warm summers and cold winters influenced by the Pannonian lowlands to the east. The nearest station with a full 1991–2020 climate normal record is Eisenstadt Nordost, roughly 8 km to the northwest at a comparable elevation of 184 metres, which recorded an annual mean temperature of 10.8 °C and average annual precipitation of 688 mm over that period. July is the warmest month, with a mean temperature of 21.4 °C, and January the coldest, at 0.4 °C; the station recorded an average of about 73 summer days (days reaching 25 °C or above) and 71 frost days per year over the period.

Climate data for Eisenstadt Nordost (184 m), 1991–2020 normals
| Month | Jan | Feb | Mar | Apr | May | Jun | Jul | Aug | Sep | Oct | Nov | Dec | Year |
|---|---|---|---|---|---|---|---|---|---|---|---|---|---|
| Mean daily maximum °F (°C) | 38.5 (3.6) | 43.0 (6.1) | 52.0 (11.1) | 62.6 (17.0) | 70.2 (21.2) | 77.0 (25.0) | 81.0 (27.2) | 80.4 (26.9) | 70.2 (21.2) | 59.2 (15.1) | 48.2 (9.0) | 39.0 (3.9) | 60.1 (15.6) |
| Daily mean °F (°C) | 32.7 (0.4) | 35.6 (2.0) | 42.8 (6.0) | 52.2 (11.2) | 60.3 (15.7) | 67.3 (19.6) | 70.5 (21.4) | 69.6 (20.9) | 60.3 (15.7) | 50.7 (10.4) | 42.1 (5.6) | 34.0 (1.1) | 51.4 (10.8) |
| Mean daily minimum °F (°C) | 28.2 (−2.1) | 30.2 (−1.0) | 36.1 (2.3) | 43.9 (6.6) | 51.4 (10.8) | 58.1 (14.5) | 61.3 (16.3) | 61.2 (16.2) | 53.6 (12.0) | 45.3 (7.4) | 37.8 (3.2) | 30.0 (−1.1) | 44.8 (7.1) |
| Average precipitation inches (mm) | 1.3 (34) | 1.2 (30) | 1.9 (49) | 1.8 (45) | 2.9 (74) | 3.2 (81) | 3.0 (77) | 3.0 (77) | 3.0 (75) | 2.2 (56) | 1.9 (49) | 1.7 (42) | 27.1 (688) |
Source: Tauernwetter Forschung, from GeoSphere Austria data (station: Eisenstadt Nordost)

== History ==
=== Early settlement ===
Archaeological finds made during clay-extraction work in the 19th century indicate that the area of present-day Antau was inhabited in prehistoric times, when it lay within the sphere of the Celtic hillfort settlement on the Schwarzenbacher Burgberg, part of the Celtic kingdom of Noricum. Under Roman rule the site fell within the province of Pannonia, and Roman-era graves have repeatedly been uncovered during later construction work. The remains of a Roman-era villa rustica at the eastern edge of the modern municipal boundary, known since field surveys in the 1970s, are discussed further under § Archaeological and secular monuments. Local historians have suggested the settlement may have originated as a Roman villa rustica.

=== Medieval period ===
Antau was first mentioned in documentary sources in 1245. Between the 13th and 18th centuries the village was repeatedly divided among several manorial lords. In the High Middle Ages it was held by the Osl family, later passing to a Seifried of Antau and then to the Kanizsai family, before eventually coming into the possession of the Esterházy family. A second, smaller settlement within the modern municipal area, variously recorded as Bikifölde or Bikifeulde and later known as Weixlgut, was likewise divided among several owners over the medieval period. A 1361 dispute over part of these lands saw retainers of Nikolaus of Mattersdorf forcibly seize the holding of a local noble identified as Johannes, a former ban of Dalmatia and Croatia; in 1396, the co-owners of the remaining Bikifölde lands and an associated mill on the Wulka sold their holdings to the lords of Pöttelsdorf. Parts of the Bikifölde lands later passed to the Franciscan monastery in Eisenstadt. A parish church dedicated to St. Andrew is first attested in the late 14th century. Toward the end of the medieval period, the village faced a risk of complete depopulation, a fate historians believe befell Bikifölde, partly driven by emigration to wine-growing communities in the region.

=== Ottoman era and Croatian settlement ===
In the early 16th century, a large part of Antau's population was lost during Ottoman military campaigns. To prevent the village's complete abandonment, Croatian settlers were brought in, part of a broader, multi-decade wave of Croatian migration into what is now Burgenland and adjoining parts of western Hungary during the 16th century, driven by the destabilisation of the region during the Ottoman–Habsburg wars. Estimates of the total number of Croatian settlers involved in this migration vary considerably among historians, ranging from roughly 20,000 to as many as 100,000 across the wider settlement area. According to a linguistic-historical overview of the community, the modern Burgenland Croat identity and its literary language developed from this 16th-century settlement wave over the following centuries, incorporating German and Hungarian elements alongside its Chakavian Croatian base. The newly settled Croatian community in Antau was Roman Catholic and was served exclusively by Croatian-speaking parish priests. Antau remained a mixed-language community into the modern era, one of relatively few such settlements among the Croatian villages of Burgenland, most of which developed as linguistically uniform.

=== Hungarian rule to 1921 ===
Along with the rest of what later became Burgenland, Antau remained part of the Kingdom of Hungary until 1920–21, forming part of the German-speaking western Hungarian region known as Deutsch-Westungarn. Since 1898, Hungarian-language administrative policy required the use of the Hungarian place name Selegszántó, as part of the Magyarization policy pursued by the government in Budapest. Following the Treaty of Trianon and the transfer of the territory to Austria, Antau became part of the newly created state of Burgenland in 1921.

=== 20th century ===
Following Burgenland's incorporation into Austria in 1921, local affairs in Antau continued to be shaped in large part by the parish priest. During the 1920s, donations from a pair of brothers who had emigrated from the village and become wealthy in the United States funded significant improvements to the parish church, including its electrification and the acquisition of pews, two bells, a side altar, and a high altar. The same parish priest also founded the village's local Raiffeisen credit cooperative in 1925.

Antau suffered military losses in both world wars: 36 men from the village were killed in the First World War, and the Second World War cost the village 34 dead and 17 missing. At the end of the Second World War, Antau was occupied by Soviet troops, and postwar reconstruction proceeded slowly owing to the occupation and a shortage of financial resources.

The village nonetheless experienced steady, gradual growth until 1971, when, under Burgenland's statewide Gemeindestrukturverbesserungsgesetz (Municipal Structure Improvement Act), which took effect on 1 January 1971, Antau was merged with the neighbouring municipality of Hirm to form the joint municipality of Hirm-Antau, with its administrative seat at Hirm. The wider reform reduced the number of municipalities statewide from 319 to either 128 or 138, depending on the source, and sources likewise differ on how many municipalities were dissolved and consolidated in the process; Atlas Burgenland's account of the reform gives both sets of figures in different places without reconciling them.

According to Atlas Burgenland, opposition to the merger within Antau itself ran as high as 97 percent among those consulted, and the mayor of Hirm was at one point refused entry to Antau's own municipal office by local residents; court proceedings were subsequently brought against some of those involved. The merger met further, separately documented opposition: according to a contemporary report in the newspaper Burgenländische Freiheit, around 250 residents drove some 50 tractors and 30 cars to the Landhaus in Eisenstadt on 28 January 1971 to demonstrate against the proposed merger with Hirm, displaying a banner indicating they would have accepted union with a proposed larger municipality called "Wulkatal", comprising several surrounding villages, in preference to a merger with Hirm alone. Residents subsequently boycotted the 1971 municipal council election in protest, and all 19 council seats in the merged municipality were consequently held by the SPÖ of Hirm. Opposition to the merger persisted for years, according to Atlas Burgenland, which attributes to local residents a characterization of Antau's position within the joint municipality as the "Reserverad am Gemeindewagen" ("the spare wheel on the municipal cart"). A binding local referendum was subsequently held in Antau in which 83 percent of participating residents voted in favour of separation from Hirm. The joint municipality was formally dissolved and Antau re-established as an independent municipality by state law in 1991, though the joint primary school the two municipalities had shared was not itself divided until 1995, following a second local referendum on the matter. Municipal sources describe the twenty-year merger as having cost the village development time it would otherwise have had as an independent municipality.

== Demographics ==
Historical population
| Year | Pop. | ±% |
|---|---|---|
| 1869 | 926 | — |
| 1880 | 912 | −1.5% |
| 1890 | 903 | −1.0% |
| 1900 | 927 | +2.7% |
| 1910 | 908 | −2.0% |
| 1923 | 879 | −3.2% |
| 1934 | 900 | +2.4% |
| 1939 | 828 | −8.0% |
| 1951 | 677 | −18.2% |
| 1961 | 709 | +4.7% |
| 1971 | 685 | −3.4% |
| 1981 | 683 | −0.3% |
| 1991 | 700 | +2.5% |
| 2001 | 753 | +7.6% |
| 2011 | 761 | +1.1% |
| 2021 | 782 | +2.8% |

Antau is home to a significant number of members of the Burgenland Croats minority. According to the 2001 census, 64.9 percent of the population identified with the German-speaking population group and 26.2 percent with the Burgenland Croat population group, while a further 3.5 percent of residents reported Croatian as their predominant everyday language. The 2001 census also recorded that 85.1 percent of residents identified as Roman Catholic, with Islam forming the second-largest religious community at 3.2 percent. The 2001 census was the last occasion on which Statistics Austria collected data on language and religious affiliation at the level of individual municipalities; the classical door-to-door population census was subsequently discontinued in favour of a register-based Zensus, first carried out in 2011 and repeated in 2021, which draws on administrative records such as the Central Register of Residents rather than a direct survey. Equivalent village-level figures on language or religion have not been published under this register-based method.

As of 1 January 2025, the municipality had 846 inhabitants, of whom 411 were male and 435 female; 125 residents (14.8 percent) were aged under 15, and 190 (22.5 percent) were aged 65 or older. Of these, 767 held Austrian citizenship and 79 held foreign citizenship, a 9.1 percent foreign-resident share. During 2025, the municipality recorded six live births and five deaths, a natural increase of one, alongside 24 arrivals and 29 departures, a net migration loss of five; the net effect was a decrease from 846 residents on 1 January 2025 to 842 by 31 December. The same year saw four marriages, one divorce, and no naturalisations recorded in the municipality.

The population had grown from 753 recorded in the 2001 census to 782 by the 2021 register census, and continued to rise over the following years, reaching 806 by 1 January 2023 and 825 by 1 January 2024, before peaking at 846 on 1 January 2025 and edging down slightly to 842 by the end of that year. This recent growth followed a long-term decline from a 19th-century peak of 927 in 1900 to a low of 677 in 1951, largely attributed to losses in the Second World War and the difficult postwar reconstruction period under Soviet occupation, followed by decades of comparatively slow growth typical of rural Burgenland municipalities within commuting distance of larger centres.

== Politics and local government ==
The municipal council (Gemeinderat) of Antau has 13 members. Antau was self-governing until its 1971–1991 merger with the neighbouring municipality of Hirm; the circumstances of the merger and subsequent separation are covered in § 20th century. During the merger period, mayors of the joint municipality were Georg Puhm and Alfred Schreiner, both of the SPÖ.

Following Antau's re-establishment as an independent municipality in 1991, Stefan Jagschich served as mayor until 2007, when he was succeeded by Adalbert Endl of the ÖVP. According to Atlas Burgenland, the ÖVP held an absolute majority on the council in each election from the municipality's re-establishment through at least 2012, when the FPÖ won its first seat on the council. The ÖVP has won an absolute majority in each of the five local elections preceding 2022, most recently with around 60 percent of the vote in 2017; as of the 2022 election, the council comprised eight ÖVP, three SPÖ, and two FPÖ seats. Endl did not stand in the 2022 election; his deputy, Frank Wiemer of the ÖVP, succeeded him as mayor and has served since.

== Culture, landmarks, and society ==
=== Religious buildings ===
The Roman Catholic parish church of Antau is dedicated to St. Andrew (Pfarrkirche hl. Andreas) and belongs to the Deanery of Rust in the Diocese of Eisenstadt. A church on the site is first documented in 1390 and was raised to parish status before 1402. A wooden bell frame with two bells was installed in 1641. The medieval church burned down in 1683 during the second Ottoman siege of Vienna, and was rebuilt in 1809–1810 using some of the older masonry. This building was destroyed by a further fire in 1853 and rebuilt again in 1854; a bell tower was added in 1898. The church was restored in 1966 and again renovated in 1984 and 2009. Services are held in both German and Croatian, reflecting the composition of the parish community.

Several smaller wayside shrines and chapels in the village are separately listed as protected monuments. These include the Anna-Kapelle, a cross-vaulted gabled chapel with a late Baroque altar wall dating to the first half of the 18th century; an adjoining wayside column bearing a relief of Saint Rosalia and, at its top, a copy of the Eisenstadt "Bell Madonna" devotional image, from the same period; and a further column beside the chapel depicting an Ecce Homo scene. A separate Lourdes chapel, inscribed 1897, houses columns dedicated to St. John of Nepomuk (18th century) and St. Anthony of Padua (inscribed 1909); a freestanding wayside shrine to St. Anthony of Padua, with a tree-shaped 18th-century shaft and a 19th-century figure, and a plain whitewashed wayside cross complete the group. A plague and Holy Trinity column on the main square, inscribed 1708, and the weathered base and capital of a further column dedicated to Saint Sebastian, dated to around 1700 with its inscription no longer legible, both stand near the church.

=== Archaeological and secular monuments ===
The eastern edge of Antau's municipal territory, on the boundary with Wulkaprodersdorf, contains the remains of a Roman-era villa rustica, a scattered farmstead complex of the kind common across the Roman province of Pannonia. The site has been known since field surveys conducted in the 1970s, and geophysical prospection carried out between 2005 and 2008 identified around a dozen individual building structures spread across the find area. A 2016 excavation undertaken in connection with flood-defence works uncovered further remains, including the burial of a newborn close to a Roman wall foundation. Earlier archaeological interest in the area dates back to the 1890s, when the antiquarian Ludwig Bella recorded several cauldron-shaped dwelling or storage pits at Antau during a broader survey of finds in the Mattersburg district. The site, known as Villa Rustica Antau, has been individually protected as a monument since 2016.

A former mill complex on the main square, comprising a dwelling house, a granary, and a mill building and known as the Rittermühle or Kirchenmühle, is also individually protected. It stands on the site of one of several mills historically operated on the Wulka within the municipality (see § Economy).

Together with the parish church, these structures make up the eleven objects in the municipality individually listed by the Federal Monuments Office.

=== Coat of arms ===
Antau was granted the right to bear a municipal coat of arms by the Burgenland state government on 27 November 1991. The official blazon, as published by the municipality, reads: "In dem von Gold und Rot geteilten Schild unten ein rotes Mühlrad, oben ein goldener Turm, begleitet von goldenen Ähren" ("In a shield parted per fess gold and red, below a red mill-wheel, above a gold tower accompanied by gold ears of grain"). According to the municipality, the tower is derived from the former municipal seal and is interpreted as a grain-storage building, while the ears of grain likewise reference the historical importance of grain cultivation to the local economy; the mill-wheel represents the three former mills that operated on the Wulka within the municipality. The municipality describes the symbols as representing, respectively, vitality (the grain), domestic security (the tower), and industriousness (the wheel). The heraldic insignia, seals, and municipal colours of Antau and the other historically Croatian-settled communities of Burgenland, including Antau's Croatian-language designation Otava, have been catalogued in a dedicated study of the heraldry of the region's Burgenland Croat municipalities.

=== Awards and distinctions ===
In 2002, Antau received a bronze award in the village category of Entente Florale Europe, an annual pan-European competition that recognises towns and villages for excellence in horticultural display and civic environment; Pinkafeld, competing in the town category, received Austria's gold award that year.

=== Croatian cultural life ===
Antau is home to a local branch of the Croatian Cultural Association in Burgenland (Kroatischer Kulturverein im Burgenland; Hrvatsko kulturno društvo u Gradišću, HKD), the largest and oldest organisation of the Burgenland Croats, founded in 1929. The association, which has around 3,500 members and local branches in 31 villages across Burgenland, maintains a local branch in Antau known as HKD Otava. Antau is also home to a tamburitza folk-music ensemble, Tamburica Antau, founded by the association's longtime secretary-general Mate Klikovits as part of a broader revival of tamburitza playing among Burgenland Croat communities from the 1960s onward.

=== Education ===
Under Burgenland's Kindergarten Act, municipalities with a Burgenland Croat population, including Antau, operate bilingual German–Croatian kindergartens, in which the minority language is used for a legally prescribed minimum number of hours each week alongside German. Antau's municipal kindergarten, which admits children from around eighteen months to six years of age, is run on this bilingual basis, with 31 children enrolled in the 2022–2023 kindergarten year. The village's bilingual primary school, Volksschule Antau (Osnovna škola Otava), taught around 19 pupils across two classes spanning four grade levels as of the mid-2020s. The school was administratively separated from its counterpart in the neighbouring former joint municipality of Hirm in 1995, following a local referendum (see § 20th century).

=== Sport ===
The village's football club, Sportvereinigung Antau, was founded in 1930. The club won the II. Liga Mitte championship and promotion to the Landesliga in 1982. As of 2026, SV Antau competes in the 1. Klasse Mitte, one of the lower tiers of the Austrian football league system in Burgenland. The club maintains a long-standing local rivalry with ASK Hirm, the football club of the neighbouring former joint municipality.

== Notable people ==
Thomas Borenitsch (born 19 December 1980 in Eisenstadt) is an Austrian former football goalkeeper. Trained as a plumber, he played youth football for SV Antau between 1988 and 1996 before signing with SV Mattersburg in 2000. He made his Bundesliga debut on 20 May 2004 against FC Superfund Pasching, conceding four goals in a 4–0 defeat, and went on to make more than 200 appearances in the Bundesliga over his career, reaching the 2005–06 Austrian Cup final with SV Mattersburg, which the club lost 0–3 to FK Austria Wien. He retired as a player at the end of the 2015–16 season and became SV Mattersburg's goalkeeping coach, a role he held until 2018; he also worked as a goalkeeping coach at the AKA Burgenland youth academy from 2015 to 2022. In 2017 he opened a goalkeeping school based in Antau.

== Economy and infrastructure ==
=== Economy ===
Historically, Antau's economy was based on agriculture; several mills operated on the Wulka river, including a roller mill sold to the miller Mathias Feldkirchner in 1754 and another recorded as operating in the early 20th century. The site of one such mill, on the main square, survives as the Rittermühle/Kirchenmühle building, individually protected as a monument (see § Archaeological and secular monuments).

Over the 20th century the local economy shifted from a predominantly agricultural base toward one dominated by commuters working outside the municipality, a pattern common to municipalities in northern Burgenland within commuting distance of Eisenstadt, Wiener Neustadt, and Vienna. As of 31 October 2024, the municipality had 72 registered business establishments employing a combined 246 people.

=== Infrastructure ===
The nearest railway station, Wulkaprodersdorf, lies partly on Antau's cadastral territory. Between 2024 and 2026, the station operator Raaberbahn carried out an expansion of the station, including a second park-and-ride facility increasing capacity from around 230 to more than 400 parking spaces and a barrier-free pedestrian tunnel connecting the facility to the platforms. The new facility, named "Gewerbepark", entered service on 18 June 2026. Antau's mayor, Frank Wiemer, attended the project's groundbreaking ceremony alongside representatives of Wulkaprodersdorf and Raaberbahn.
