= Mattersburg District =

Coordinates: 47.746°N 16.417°E

Mattersburg District Bezirk Mattersburg
- District
- Country: Austria
- State: Burgenland
- Number of municipalities: 19
- Administrative seat: Mattersburg

Government
  - District Governor: Werner Zechmeister

Area
  - Total: 238.85 km^{2} (92.22 sq mi)

Population (2021)
  - Total: 40,593
  - Density: 169.95/km^{2} (440.17/sq mi)
- Time zone: UTC+01:00 (CET)
  - Summer (DST): UTC+02:00 (CEST)
- Vehicle registration: MA
- NUTS code: AT112

Bezirk Mattersburg (Croatian: Kotar Matrštof, Hungarian: Nagymartoni járás) is one of the seven district of the state of Burgenland in Austria. As of 2021, the district had an estimated population of 40,593 residents. The district’s administrative centre is the town of Mattersburg.

== History ==
The first mention of Mattersburg is found in a document from 1202, where it mentioned as Villa Martini. It became a town in 1926 and officially called Mattersdorf. Mattersburg district, part of Burgenland, was under the control of the Kingdom of Hungary until 1921. The region's incorporation into Austria was a result of the Treaty of Trianon (1920), which redrew the borders after the First World War.

== Geography ==
Mattersburg is one of the seven district of the state of Burgenland in Austria. Covering an area of 237.96 km^{2} (91.88 sq mi), and it incorporates 19 municipalities in northern Burgenland. Mattersburg is the capital and economic center of the district, which borders Eisenstadt-Umgebung, and Oberpullendorf in Austria and the country of Hungary to the east. The region experiences a Pannonian climate, which is characterized by warm and long summers.

=== Municipalities ===
List of municipalities:

- Antau (Otava) (771)
- Bad Sauerbrunn (2,148)
- Baumgarten (Pajngrt) (899)
- Draßburg (Rasporak) (1,141)
- Forchtenstein (Fortnava) (2,806)
- Hirm (953)
- Krensdorf (Kreništof) (592)
- Loipersbach im Burgenland (1,253)
- Marz (1,983)
- Mattersburg (Matrštof) (7,106)
- Neudörfl (4,295)
- Pöttelsdorf (693)
- Pöttsching (Pecva) (2,898)
- Rohrbach bei Mattersburg (2,712)
- Schattendorf (Šundrof) (2,445)
- Sieggraben (Sigrob) (1,293)
- Sigleß (Cikleš) (1,124)
- Wiesen (Bizmet) (2,787)
- Zemendorf-Stöttera (1,276)

== Demographics ==
As per 2021 census, the Mattersburg District had a total population of 40,593 inhabitants, with a population density of 170.6 inhabitants per square kilometer. The district's population has shown a trend of slight growth in recent years, increasing from 39,893 in 2017. About 49% of the population was males and 51% were females. The economy of the Mattersburg District is diversified, and has seen significant development in recent decades. The region has transitioned from a primarily agricultural area to one with growing industrial and service sectors. Viticulture (wine production) is a key economic sector, which benefits from the favorable Pannonian climate.
