= Pöttsching =

- Municipality
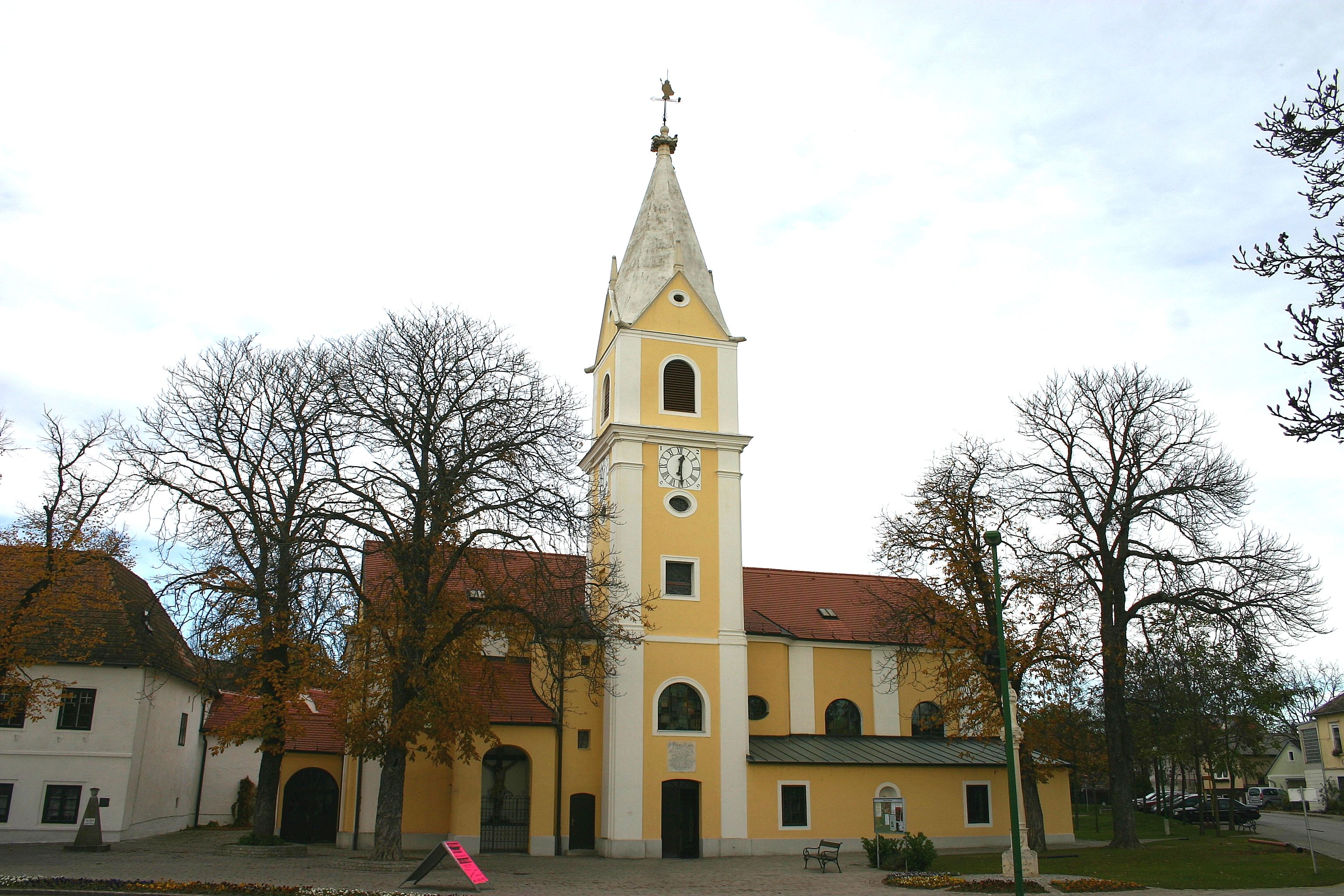
- Pöttsching parish church

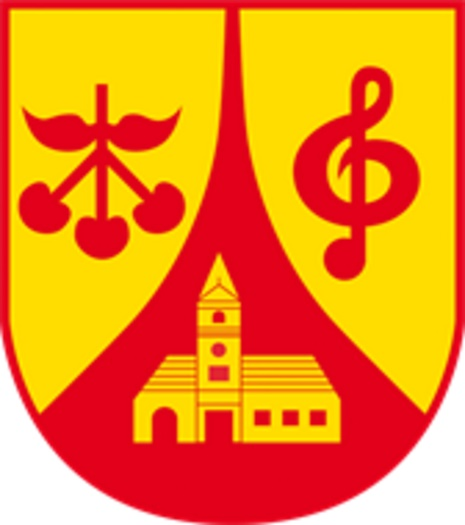
- Coat of arms

- Location within Burgenland Location within Austria
- Coordinates: 47°48′N 16°22′E
- Country: Austria
- State: Burgenland
- District: Mattersburg

Government
  - Mayor: Martin Mitteregger

Area
  - Total: 24.64 km^{2} (9.51 sq mi)
- Elevation: 218 m (715 ft)

Population (2018-01-01)
  - Total: 2,950
  - Density: 120/km^{2} (310/sq mi)
- Time zone: UTC+1 (CET)
  - Summer (DST): UTC+2 (CEST)
- Postal code: 7033
- Website: www.poettsching.at

Pöttsching (Hungarian: Pecsenyéd, Croatian: Pečva) is a town in the district of Mattersburg in the Austrian state of Burgenland.

The origin of the Hungarian name Pecsenyéd is reported to be from Pechenegs who settled in the area during the Middle Ages.

== Population ==
Historical population
| Year | Pop. | ±% |
|---|---|---|
| 1869 | 1,571 | — |
| 1880 | 1,874 | +19.3% |
| 1890 | 1,971 | +5.2% |
| 1900 | 2,007 | +1.8% |
| 1910 | 2,009 | +0.1% |
| 1923 | 2,043 | +1.7% |
| 1934 | 2,085 | +2.1% |
| 1939 | 1,948 | −6.6% |
| 1951 | 1,877 | −3.6% |
| 1961 | 2,017 | +7.5% |
| 1971 | 2,135 | +5.9% |
| 1981 | 2,139 | +0.2% |
| 1991 | 2,316 | +8.3% |
| 2001 | 2,679 | +15.7% |
| 2011 | 2,904 | +8.4% |
