= Baumgarten, Burgenland =

Baumgarten
- Municipality
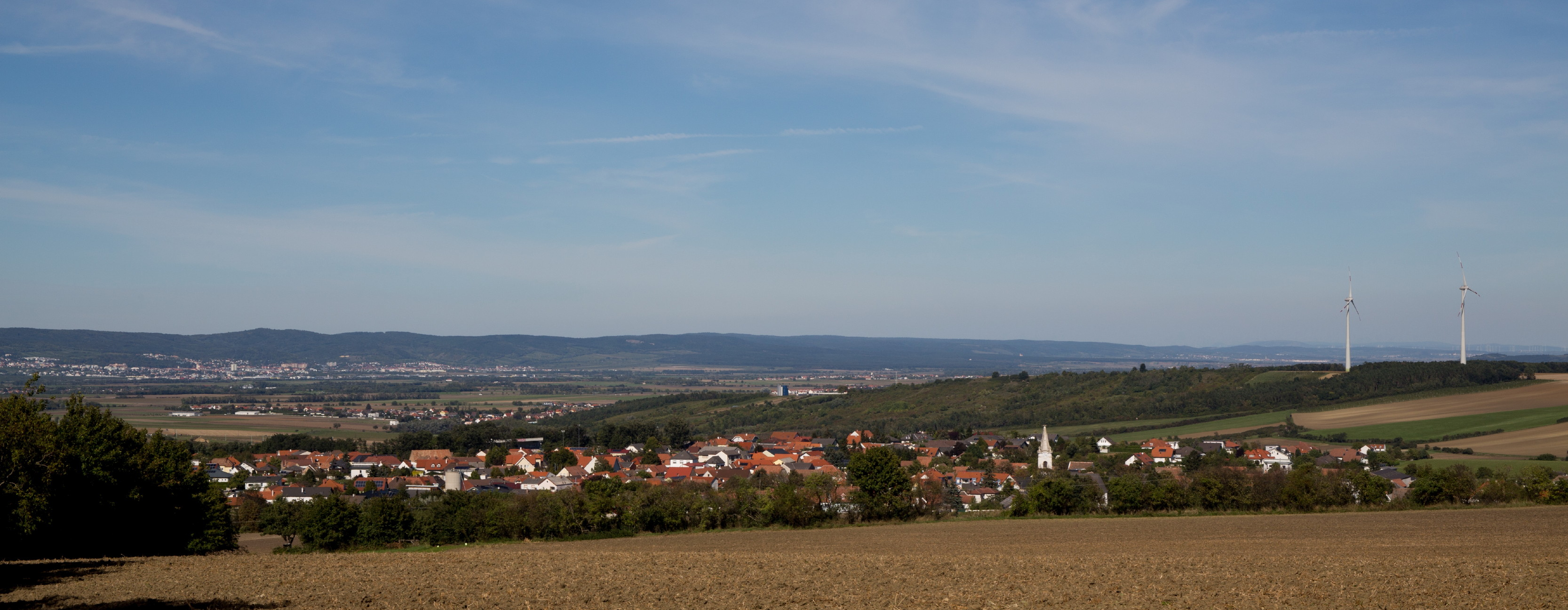

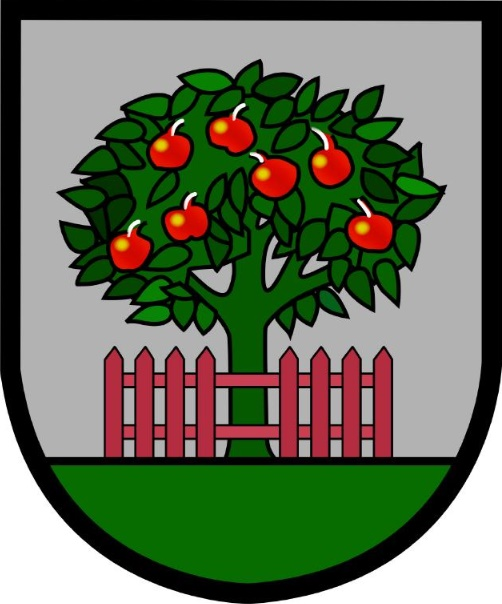
- Coat of arms

- Location within Austria
- Coordinates: 47°44′N 16°30′E
- Country: Austria
- State: Burgenland
- District: Mattersburg

Government
  - Mayor: Kurt Fischer

Area
  - Total: 6.96 km^{2} (2.69 sq mi)
- Elevation: 255 m (837 ft)

Population (2018-01-01)
  - Total: 894
  - Density: 128/km^{2} (333/sq mi)
- Time zone: UTC+1 (CET)
  - Summer (DST): UTC+2 (CEST)
- Postal code: 7021
- Website: www.baumgarten.gv.at

Baumgarten (Hungarian: Sopronkertes, Sopron-Kertes, Croatian: Pajngrt) is a town in the district of Mattersburg in the Austrian state of Burgenland.

== Population ==
Historical population
Year	Pop.	±%
1869	721	—
1880	776	+7.6%
1890	764	−1.5%
1900	870	+13.9%
1910	937	+7.7%
1923	987	+5.3%
1934	969	−1.8%
1939	902	−6.9%
1951	927	+2.8%
1961	886	−4.4%
1971	868	−2.0%
1981	864	−0.5%
1991	880	+1.9%
2001	880	+0.0%
2011	889	+1.0%

== Gallery ==
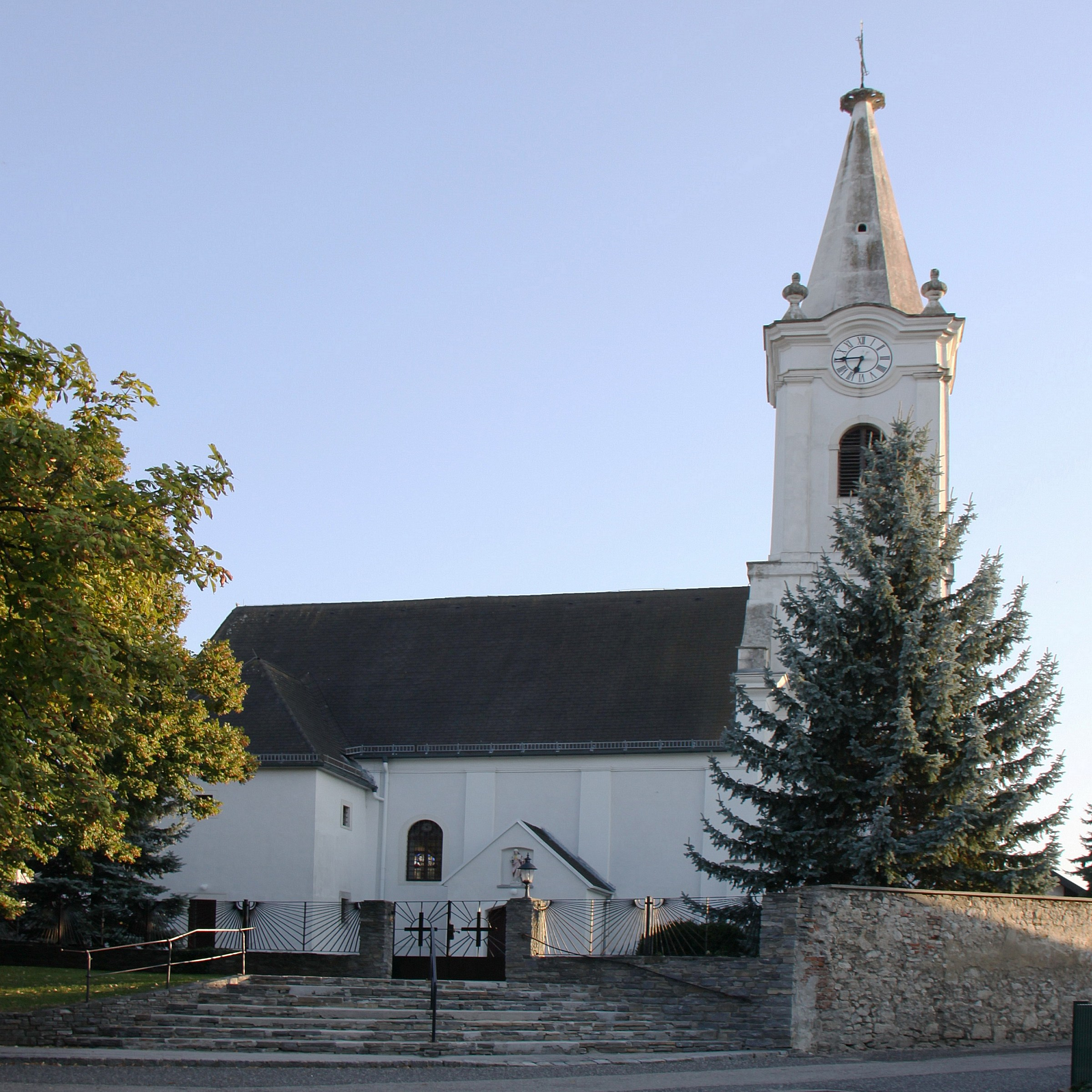
St. Peter and Paul parish church

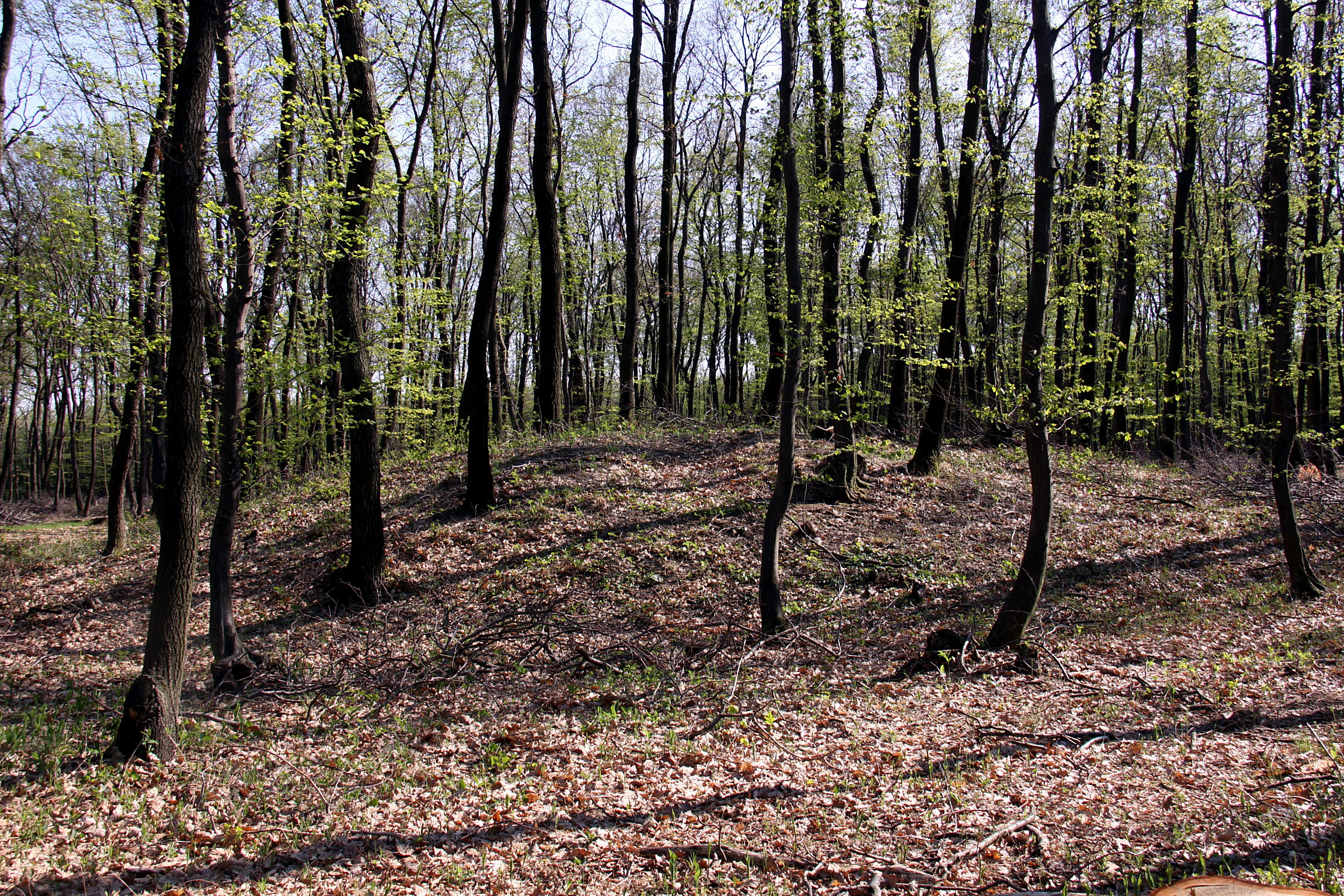
Burial mound from the 7th century BC

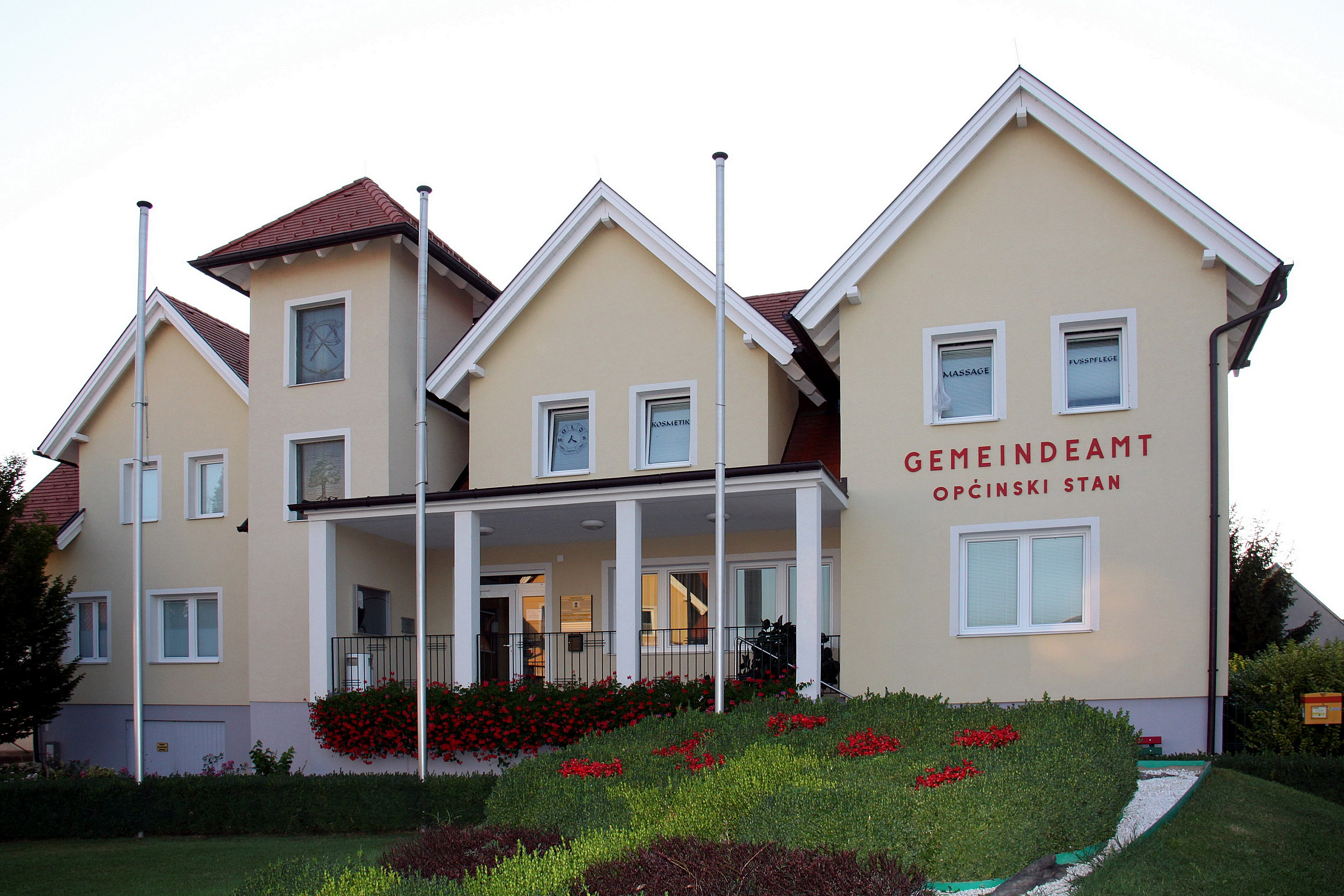
Municipal office

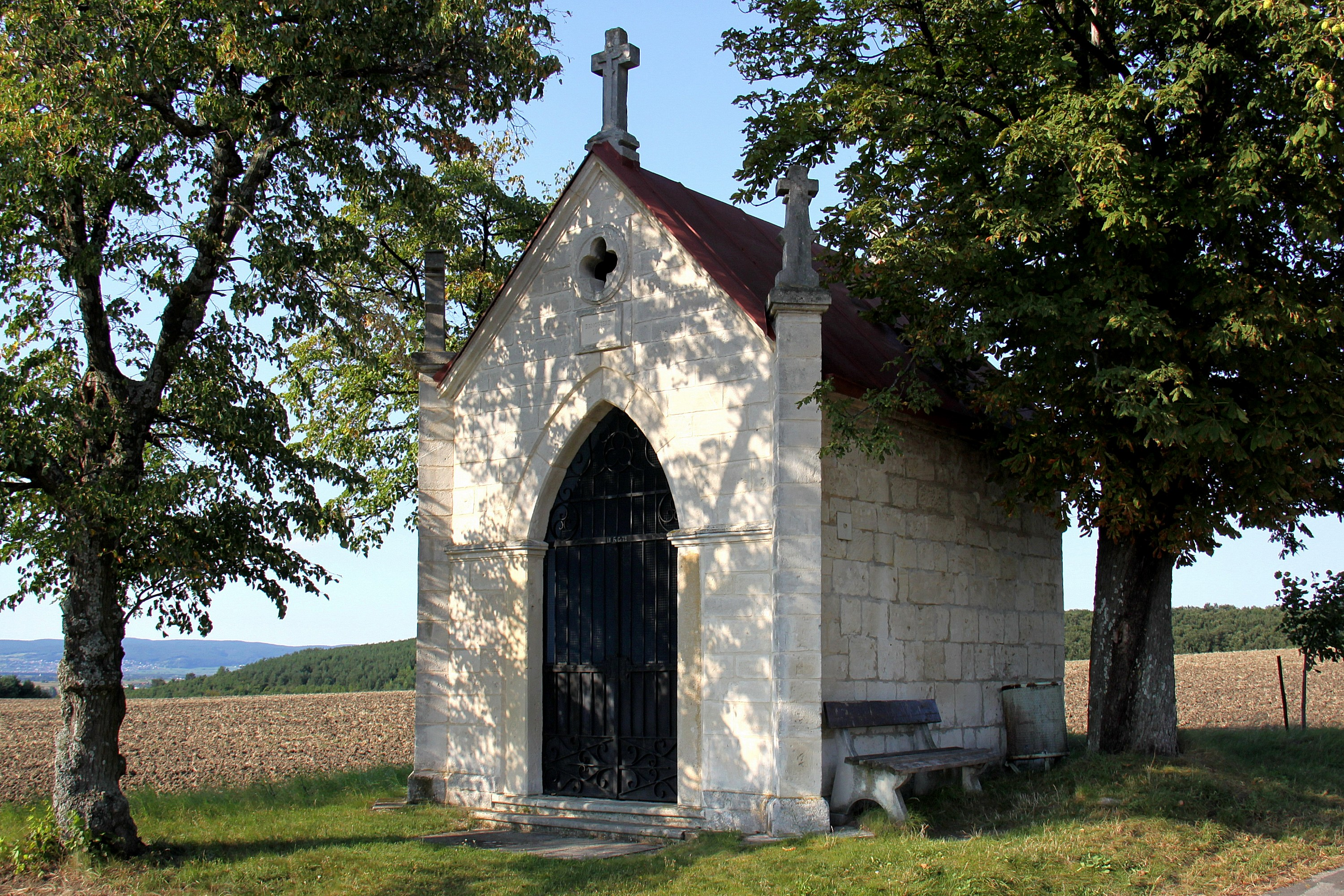
Wayside chapel

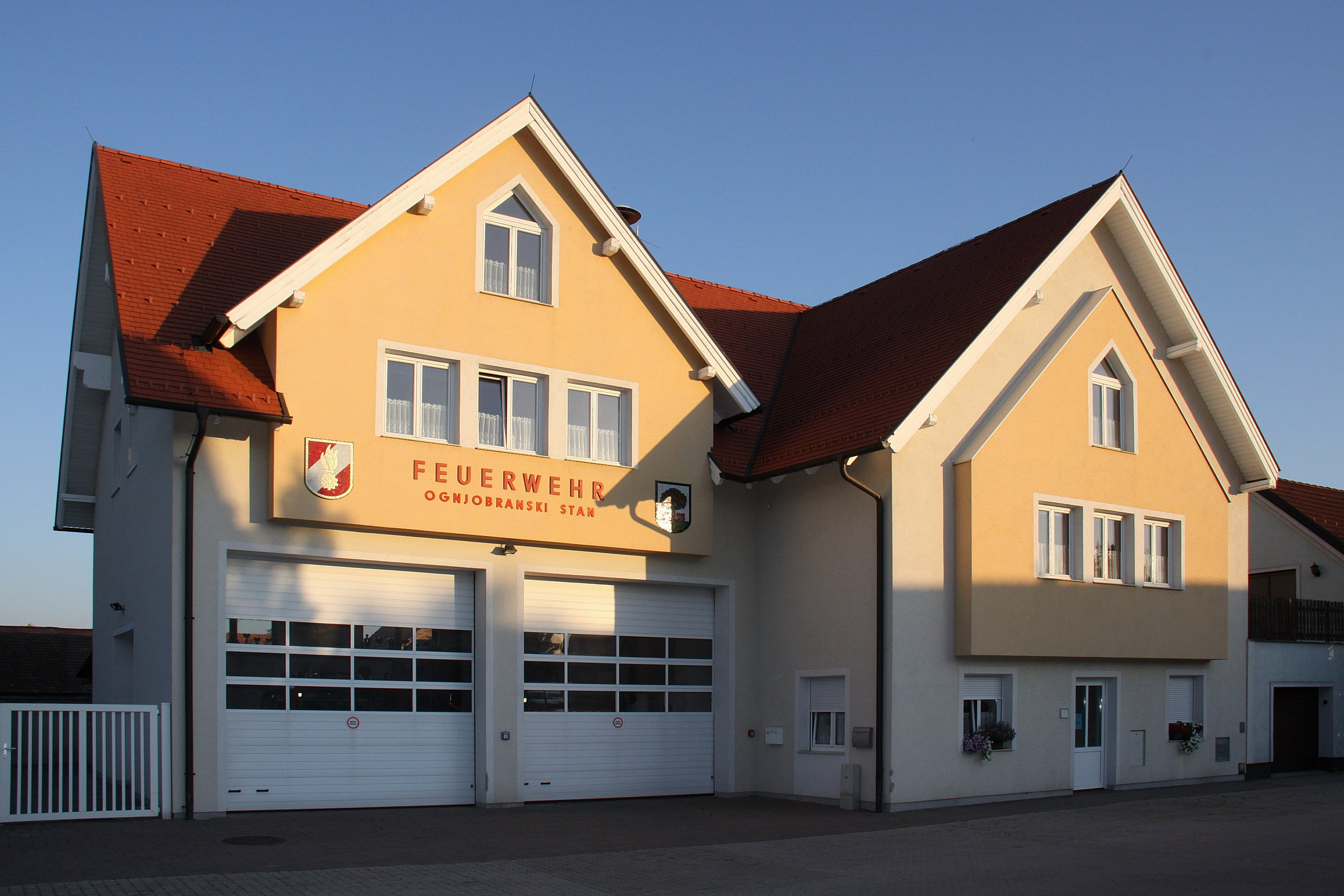
Fire station
