= Wiesen, Austria =

Wiesen
- Municipality
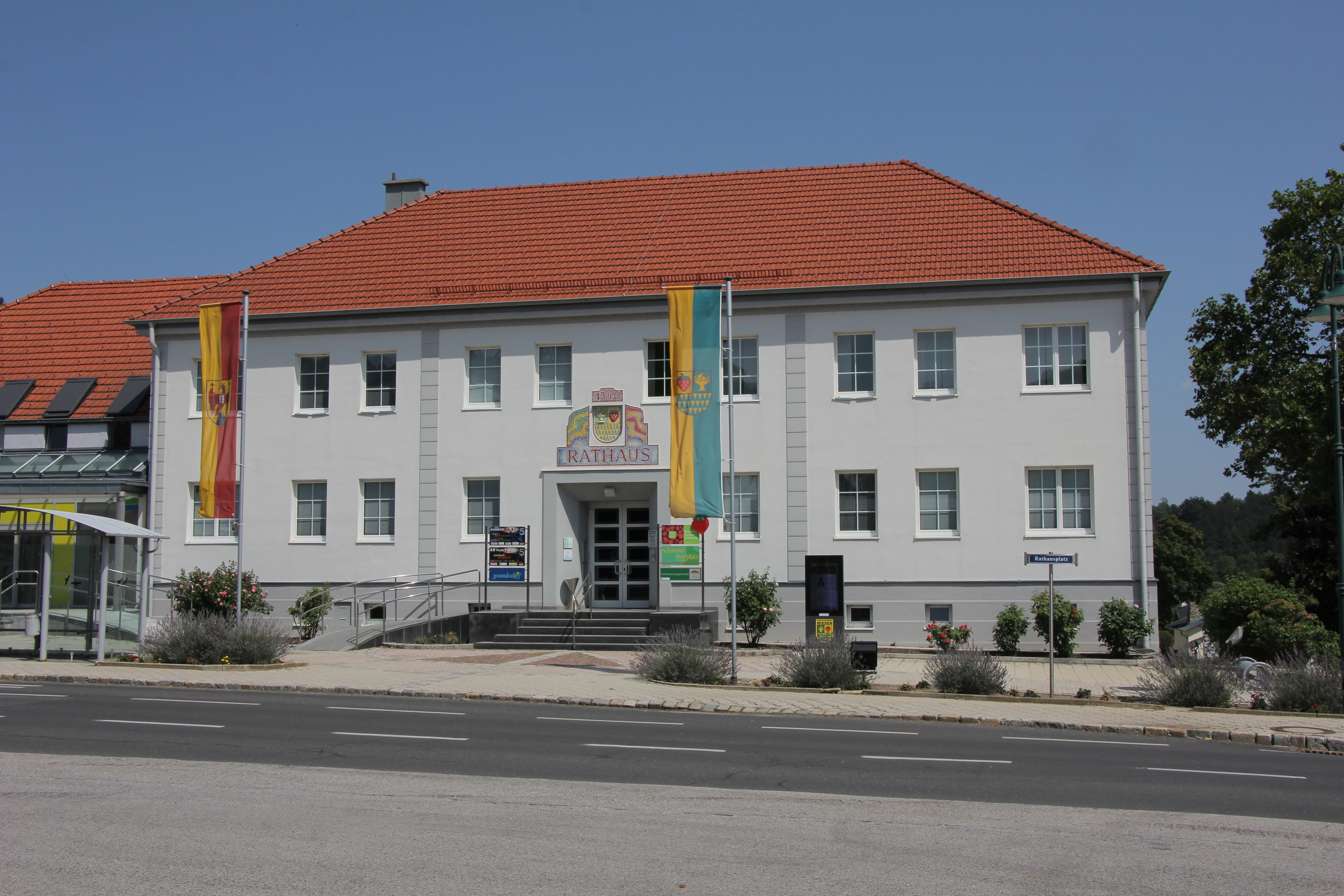
- Municipality office in Wiesen

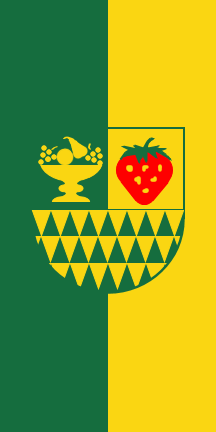
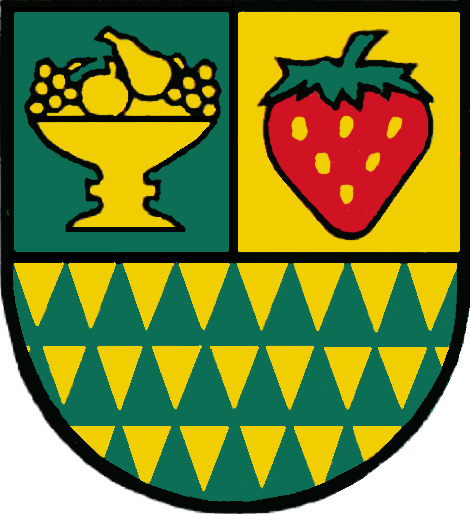
- Flag Coat of arms

- Location within Austria
- Coordinates: 47°44′N 16°20′E
- Country: Austria
- State: Burgenland
- District: Mattersburg

Government
  - Mayor: Mattias Weghofer

Area
  - Total: 18.91 km^{2} (7.30 sq mi)
- Elevation: 309 m (1,014 ft)

Population (2018-01-01)
  - Total: 2,691
  - Density: 142.3/km^{2} (368.6/sq mi)
- Time zone: UTC+1 (CET)
  - Summer (DST): UTC+2 (CEST)
- Postal code: 7203
- Website: http://www.wiesen.eu/

Wiesen (German pronunciation: [ˈviːzn̩]; Croatian: Bizmet, Bizma, Hungarian: Rétfalu) is a town in the district of Mattersburg in the Austrian state of Burgenland.

== Population ==
Historical population
Year	Pop.	±%
1869	1,322	—
1880	1,558	+17.9%
1890	1,497	−3.9%
1900	1,625	+8.6%
1910	1,799	+10.7%
1923	1,879	+4.4%
1934	2,188	+16.4%
1939	2,247	+2.7%
1951	2,199	−2.1%
1961	2,326	+5.8%
1971	2,533	+8.9%
1981	2,695	+6.4%
1991	2,692	−0.1%
2001	2,779	+3.2%
2011	2,799	+0.7%
