= Bad Sauerbrunn =

Bad Sauerbrunn Sauabrunn
- Municipality
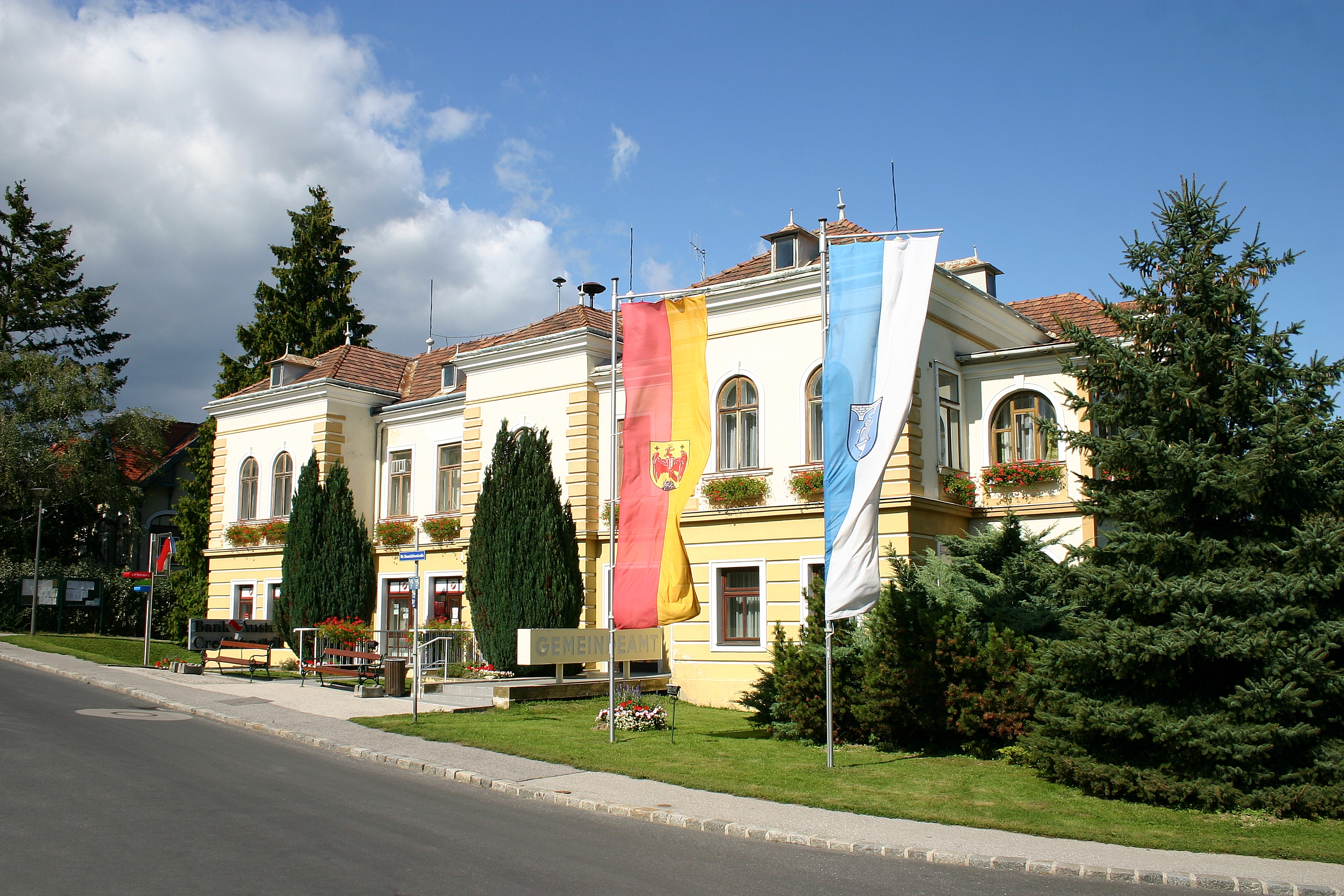
- Municipal office

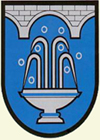
- Coat of arms

- Location within Austria
- Coordinates: 47°46′N 16°20′E
- Country: Austria
- State: Burgenland
- District: Mattersburg

Government
  - Mayor: Gerhard Hutter (LIBS)

Area
  - Total: 2.35 km^{2} (0.91 sq mi)
- Elevation: 280 m (920 ft)

Population (2018-01-01)
  - Total: 2,219
  - Density: 944/km^{2} (2,450/sq mi)
- Time zone: UTC+1 (CET)
  - Summer (DST): UTC+2 (CEST)
- Postal code: 7202
- Website: www.bad-sauerbrunn.at (in German)

Bad Sauerbrunn (German: [baːt ˈzaʊ̯ɐˌbʁʊn]; until 1987, Sauerbrunn; Hungarian: Savanyúkút; Croatian: Kisela voda; Central Bavarian: Sauabrunn) is the name of a mineral spa and the town in which it is located, in the district of Mattersburg in the Austrian state of Burgenland. The spa was used in ancient times by the Romans and was re-opened in 1847. The town, formerly called Savanyúkút, was part of German-speaking western Hungary until that territory became part of Austria in 1920. In 1921 Sauerbrunn, became the provisional capital of the newly formed federal state of Burgenland until 1925, when the seat of government moved to Eisenstadt.

== Population ==
Historical population
| Year | Pop. | ±% |
|---|---|---|
| 1869 | 15 | — |
| 1880 | 30 | +100.0% |
| 1890 | 122 | +306.7% |
| 1900 | 445 | +264.8% |
| 1910 | 703 | +58.0% |
| 1923 | 1,357 | +93.0% |
| 1934 | 1,350 | −0.5% |
| 1939 | 1,672 | +23.9% |
| 1951 | 1,900 | +13.6% |
| 1961 | 1,692 | −10.9% |
| 1971 | 1,656 | −2.1% |
| 1981 | 1,676 | +1.2% |
| 1991 | 1,715 | +2.3% |
| 2001 | 1,914 | +11.6% |
| 2011 | 2,089 | +9.1% |
