= Neudörfl =

- Municipality
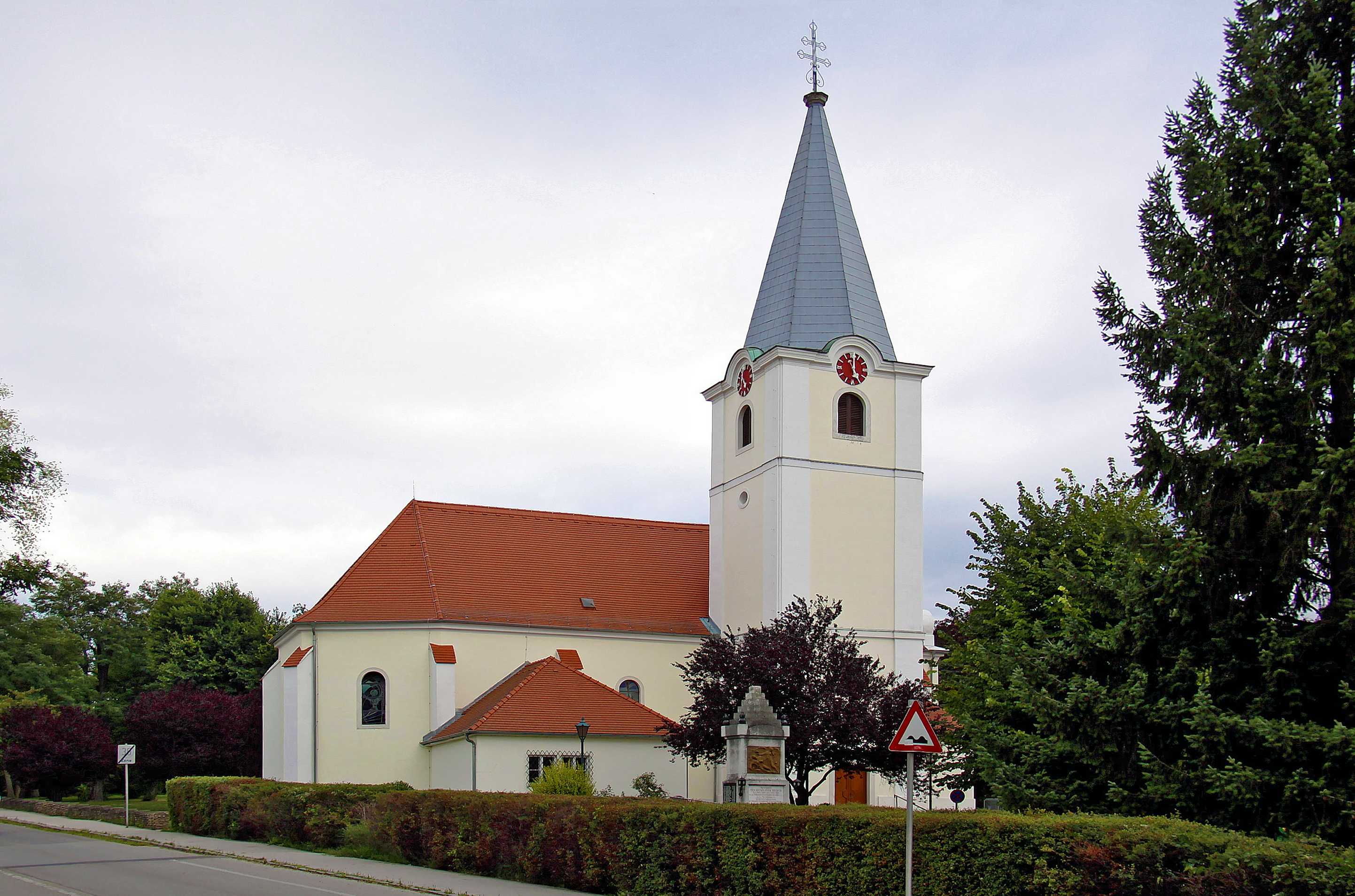
- Neudörfl parish church

- Coat of arms

- Location within Austria
- Coordinates: 47°48′N 16°18′E
- Country: Austria
- State: Burgenland
- District: Mattersburg

Government
  - Mayor: Dieter Posch

Area
  - Total: 9.01 km^{2} (3.48 sq mi)
- Elevation: 273 m (896 ft)

Population (2018-01-01)
  - Total: 4,564
  - Density: 507/km^{2} (1,310/sq mi)
- Time zone: UTC+1 (CET)
  - Summer (DST): UTC+2 (CEST)
- Postal code: 7201
- Website: https://www.neudoerfl.gv.at

Neudörfl (Neudörfl an der Leitha, Hungarian: Lajtaszentmiklós, Croatian: Novo selo) is a town in the district of Mattersburg in the Austrian state of Burgenland.

== Population ==
Historical population
Year	Pop.	±%
1869	1,700	—
1880	1,813	+6.6%
1890	1,986	+9.5%
1900	2,336	+17.6%
1910	2,454	+5.1%
1923	2,417	−1.5%
1934	2,647	+9.5%
1939	2,645	−0.1%
1951	2,426	−8.3%
1961	2,488	+2.6%
1971	2,724	+9.5%
1981	3,243	+19.1%
1991	3,343	+3.1%
2001	3,942	+17.9%
2011	4,317	+9.5%
