= Krensdorf =

- Municipality
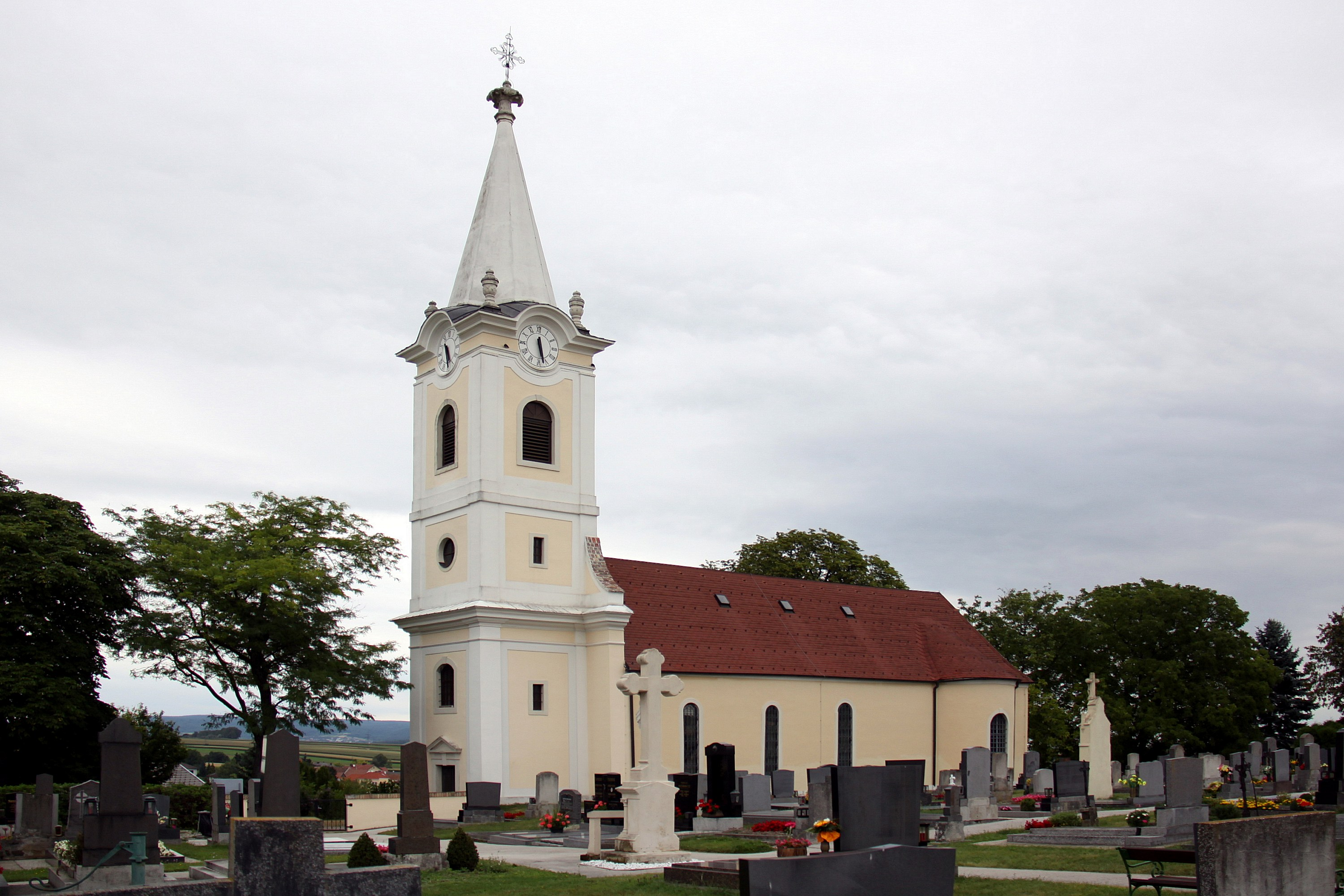
- Krensdorf parish church and cemetery

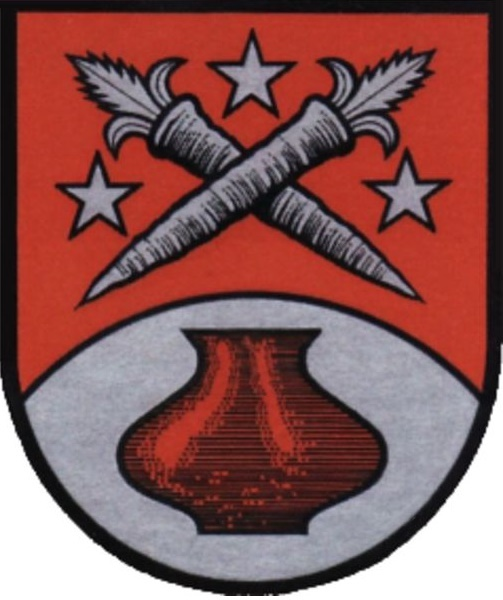
- Coat of arms

- Location within Austria
- Coordinates: 47°47′N 16°25′E
- Country: Austria
- State: Burgenland
- District: Mattersburg

Government
  - Mayor: Karl Izmenyi (ÖVP)

Area
  - Total: 7.79 km^{2} (3.01 sq mi)
- Elevation: 193 m (633 ft)

Population (2018-01-01)
  - Total: 642
  - Density: 82.4/km^{2} (213/sq mi)
- Time zone: UTC+1 (CET)
  - Summer (DST): UTC+2 (CEST)
- Postal code: 7031
- Area code: +43 2626
- Website: www.krensdorf.at

Krensdorf (Hungarian: Tormafalu, Croatian: Kreništof) is a town in the district of Mattersburg in the Austrian state of Burgenland.

== Population ==
Historical population
Year	Pop.	±%
1869	965	—
1880	974	+0.9%
1890	914	−6.2%
1900	956	+4.6%
1910	889	−7.0%
1923	871	−2.0%
1934	851	−2.3%
1939	815	−4.2%
1951	721	−11.5%
1961	646	−10.4%
1971	621	−3.9%
1981	588	−5.3%
1991	552	−6.1%
2001	616	+11.6%
2011	620	+0.6%
2016	626	+1.0%
