= Pöttelsdorf =

- Municipality
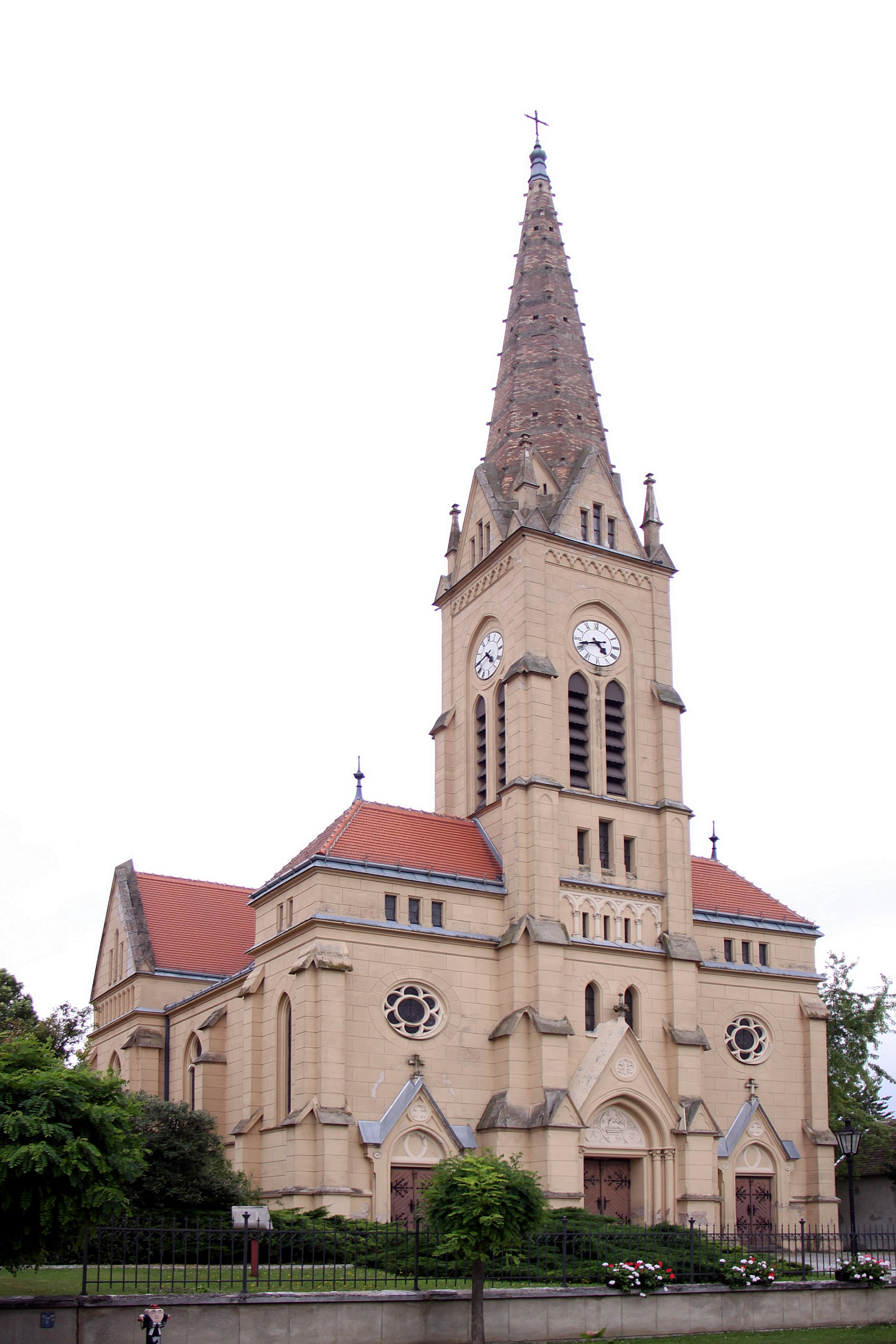
- Pöttelsdorf lutheran church

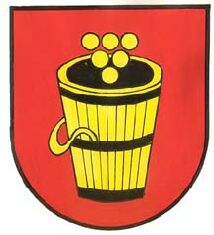
- Coat of arms

- Location within Austria
- Coordinates: 47°45′N 16°26′E
- Country: Austria
- State: Burgenland
- District: Mattersburg

Government
  - Mayor: Rainer Schuber

Area
  - Total: 7.86 km^{2} (3.03 sq mi)
- Elevation: 205 m (673 ft)

Population (2018-01-01)
  - Total: 735
  - Density: 93.5/km^{2} (242/sq mi)
- Time zone: UTC+1 (CET)
  - Summer (DST): UTC+2 (CEST)
- Postal code: 7023

Pöttelsdorf (Hungarian: Petőfalva) is a village in the district of Mattersburg in the Austrian state of Burgenland.

== Population ==
Historical population
Year	Pop.	±%
1869	616	—
1880	663	+7.6%
1890	647	−2.4%
1900	721	+11.4%
1910	700	−2.9%
1923	667	−4.7%
1934	639	−4.2%
1939	616	−3.6%
1951	667	+8.3%
1961	597	−10.5%
1971	584	−2.2%
1981	581	−0.5%
1991	587	+1.0%
2001	638	+8.7%
2011	691	+8.3%
