= Desiderius Hédervári =

Hungarian nobleman and soldier (died 1330)

- Lord of Világosvár
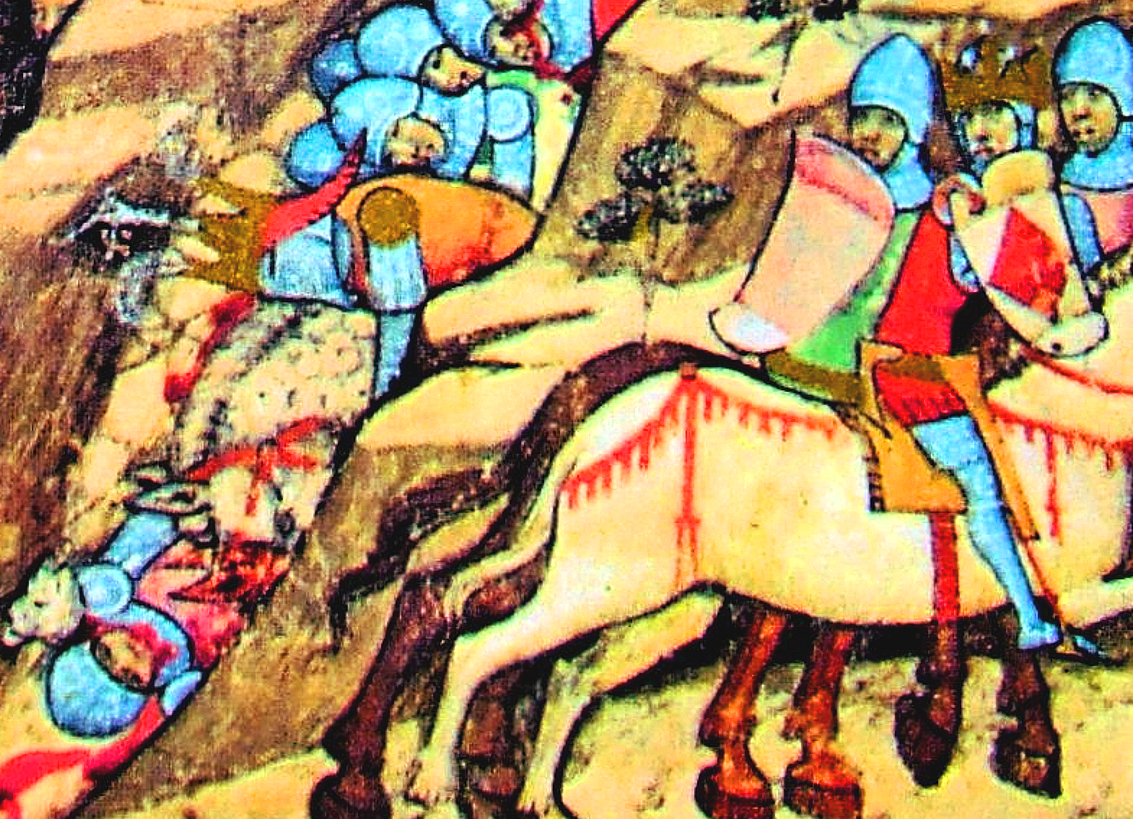
- A detail of a miniature in the Illuminated Chronicle, which depicts Desiderius' heroic death during the Battle of Posada (wearing royal armor and crown with Angevin crest)

Judge of the Queen's Court
- Reign: 1323–1330
- Predecessor: Mikcs Ákos
- Successor: Paul Garai
- Died: 12 November 1330; Red Tower Pass, Battle of Posada
- Noble family: House of Hédervári
- Issue: Henry
- Father: Denis III Héder

Desiderius Hédervári de Világosvár (Hungarian: világosvári Hédervári Dezső; killed 12 November 1330) was a Hungarian medieval nobleman and soldier, one of the first members of the prestigious Hédervári family. He held important positions in the queenly court since the 1320s. He sacrificed himself protecting King Charles I in the Battle of Posada.

== Career ==
=== Early activity ===
Desiderius descended from the Hédervár branch of the gens (clan) Héder, as the son of Denis (III) "the White-headed". He had two brothers, Nicholas (II) and Andrew, who died in 1330 and 1326, respectively. Desiderius first appears in contemporary records in 1285, when acquired the village of Bodak, which laid in the area between Danube and Csiliz creek in Győr County (present-day Bodíky in Medzičiližie, a southern sub-region of Žitný ostrov in Slovakia). Since the early 1280s, the Héderváris' distant relative, the powerful Kőszegi family gradually extended their influence over Western Transdanubia, including Győr and Pozsony counties, where the majority of the Héderváris' lands had laid. It is plausible that Desiderius and his brothers were also subjugated by the unscrupulous oligarch Ivan Kőszegi, who forced several local nobles to join his allegiance and enter his service.

His activities in the coming decades – including the era of interregnum (1301–10) and the subsequent unification war (1310–23) against the oligarchs – are unknown. When Charles I of Hungary waged war against the Kőszegis in 1316, Desiderius was among those familiares, who left the allegiance of Andrew Kőszegi and swore loyalty to the king. It is uncertain, whether the Hédervári brothers actively participated in the royal campaign in Transdanubia, nevertheless Andrew Kőszegi sent his mercenaries to pillage and burn their possessions. Temporarily, Desiderius lost all of his estates, "risking his entire fortune" for the monarch. Thereafter, he could hope the recovery of lost family landholdings only from a successful restoration of the strong royal power. After Charles I defeated the Kőszegis by the autumn of 1317, Desiderius was granted the villages of Sérc (Felsőlövő) and Szil near Lake Neusiedl (Fertő) in Sopron County as a compensation for his material losses and loyal service in September 1317 (present-day Schützen am Gebirge and Rust in Burgenland, Austria, respectively).

=== Court positions ===
After the fall of James Borsa and his clan's oligarchic province, Desiderius was made ispán of Zaránd County and castellan of Világos Castle (today ruins in Șiria, Romania) in 1318. He retained both offices until his death, as a result he appeared in contemporary documents with the suffix "de Világosvár" throughout his remaining life. He also served as castellan of Kapuvár for a brief time in 1318, which fort previously belonged to the domain of the Kőszegis, so perhaps he played a role in its capture. Charles I donated the land of Győrság (or Bocsság) in Győr County to Desiderius in that year, which was initially a possession of the royal winemakers.

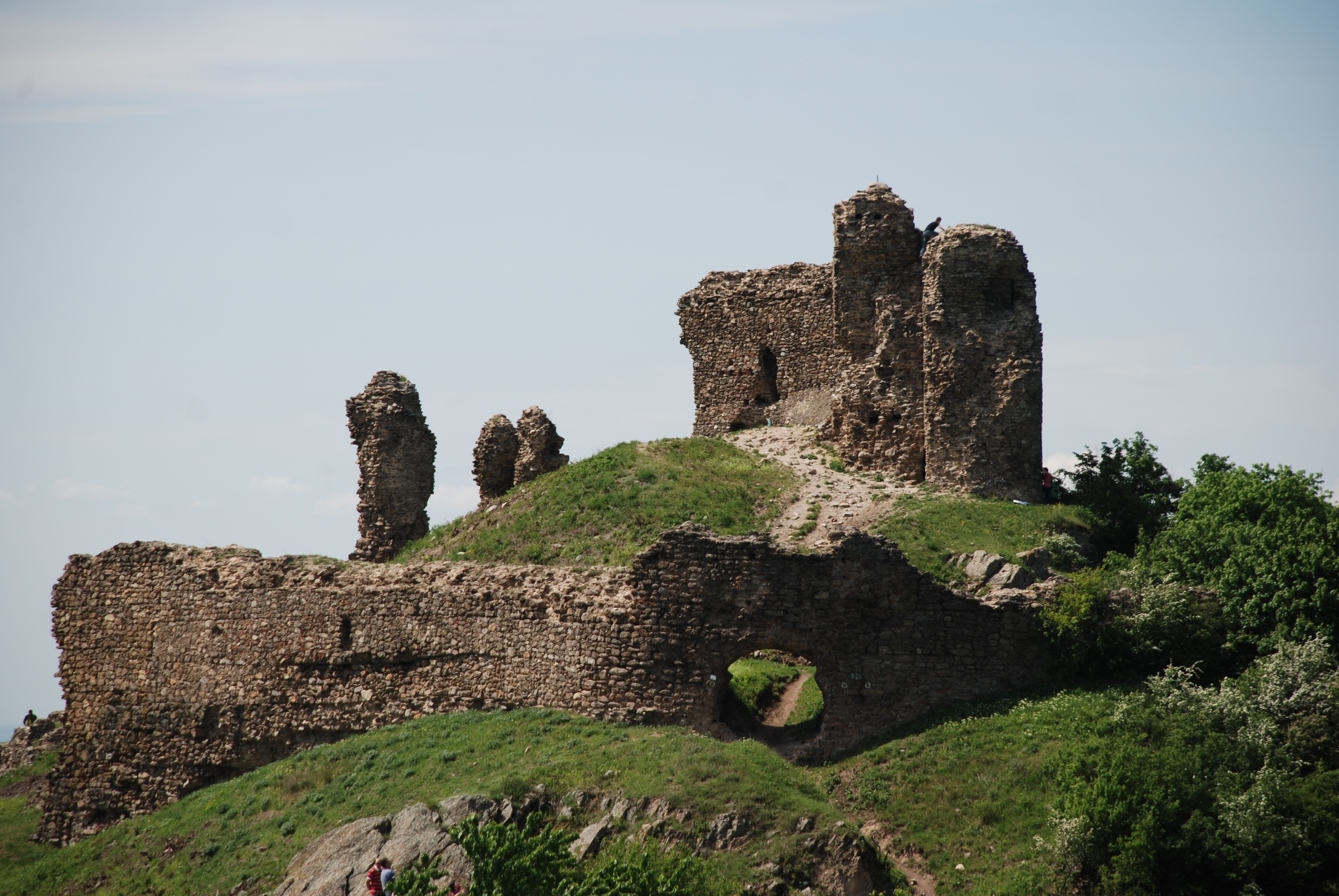
Világos Castle, today ruins near Șiria, Romania

Desiderius entered the queenly court of Elizabeth of Poland – Charles' third or fourth wife – by March 1321, when he was first styled as equerry (Master of the horse) to the queen. He also served as Judge of the Queen's Court since February 1323, which was the most prestigious position in the queenly household. He held both dignities until his death. Nevertheless, Desiderius remained a confidant of Charles I, there is no record of his any activity relating Queen Elizabeth or her interests. With his positions, Desiderius became a member of the government elite, albeit as one of its insignificant officials. He was one of the signatory barons in that document in April 1323, when Frederick the Fair and his brothers renounced Pressburg (now Bratislava in Slovakia), which they had controlled for decades, in exchange for the support they had received from Charles against Louis IV, Holy Roman Emperor in the previous year. Desiderius frequently resided in the new capital Visegrád thereafter. He was granted the estates Farkasfölde and Kövesd in Győr County by Charles I in 1324, but the family of the late Stephen Vönöcki successfully recovered the lands shortly thereafter.

He was made ispán of Sopron County in July 1326, replacing Mikcs Ákos. In this capacity, he was entrusted to hand over the twentieth part of the county's tithe to the abbot of the Klostermarienberg Abbey (Borsmonostor, today part of Mannersdorf an der Rabnitz, Austria) and his brothers. He also judged in the lawsuit between the abbot and Lawrence Kanizsai over the ownership of Hidegség and Fertőhomok in August 1326. He dealt with the revenues of the Klostermarienberg Abbey too in 1327. When Charles I instructed the burghers of Sopron that all wooden and stone structures built outside the city walls should be demolished and that residents should move inside the city walls, the king commissioned Desiderius to calm the quarrels and to control the execution of the order in June 1328. Desiderius was one of the signatories of that diploma of Charles in Bruck an der Leitha on 21 September 1328, when the Hungarian monarch signed a peace treaty with the three dukes of Austria (Frederick the Fair, Albert the Lame, and Otto the Merry), who renounced Pressburg and the Muraköz (now Međimurje in Croatia). Desiderius was among those appointed noble judges in May 1330, who has ruled over the kindred Záh, which one of notable members, Felician Záh had attempted to assassinate the royal family on 17 April 1330 in Visegrád. By that time, Desiderius also became ispán of Győr County, succeeding his brother Nicholas, who died shortly before. Consequently, he had already held six positions simultaneously in that year, not long before his own death. Desiderius summoned a general assembly (Latin: generalis congregatio) at Sopron for the nobles of Sopron County in June 1330, where he acted as a co-judge alongside Demetrius Nekcsei and Paul Nagymartoni.

== Death and legacy ==
[...] The King himself [Charles I] had changed his coat of arms for those of Desev, the son of Dionysius [Desiderius Hédervári], who was cruelly slain, as they [the Wallachians] took him for the King. With a few men the King barely made his escape, protected by his faithful soldiers. [...]

— The Hungarian Illuminated Chronicle

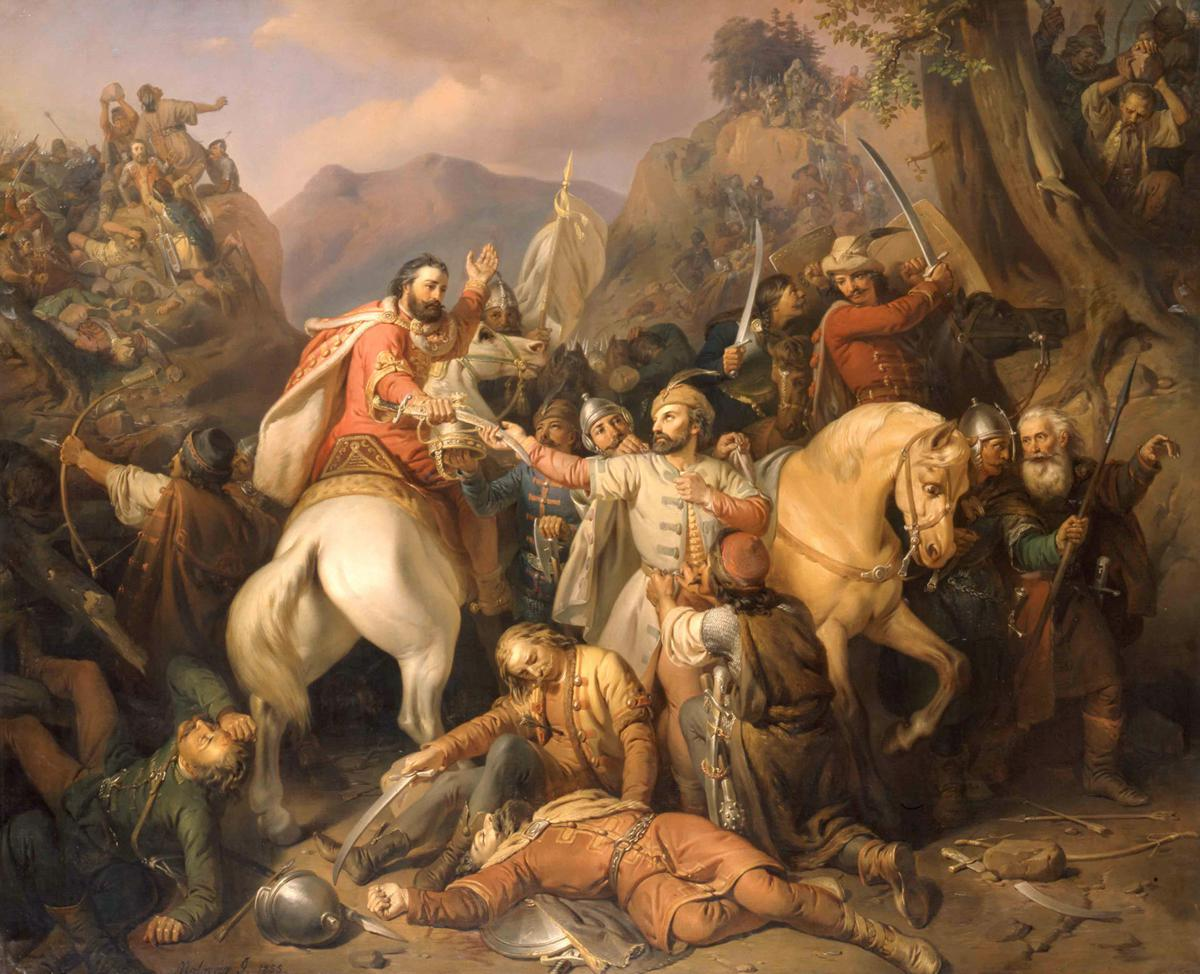
Dezső sacrifices himself protecting Charles Robert, by József Molnár, oil on canvas in 1855

In September 1330, Charles launched a military expedition against Basarab I of Wallachia who had attempted to get rid of his suzerainty. Along with several other barons, Desiderius also joined the war. The Hungarian army seized several forts in Wallachia, before Basarab applied scorched earth tactics, compelling Charles to make a truce with the voivode and withdraw his troops from Wallachia. While the royal troops were marching through a narrow pass across the Southern Carpathians on 9 November, the Wallachians ambushed them at the Red Tower Pass (Romanian: Turnu Roșu Pass, Hungarian: Vöröstoronyi-szoros), which connected Wallachia with Transylvania. During the next four days, the royal army was decimated; Charles I could only escape from the battlefield after changing his royal armor with Desiderius Hédervári, who sacrificed his life to enable the king's escape, according to the narration of the near-contemporary Illuminated Chronicle. Based on this, 15th-century Polish historian Jan Długosz also preserved his death. His heroism was depicted by 19th-century Romantic painter József Molnár in 1855. However, some modern scholars expressed doubts about the reality of the story, because neither contemporary nor subsequent documents referred to the circumstances of Desiderius' death, in addition to the political insignificance of his descendants. Historian László Veszprémy emphasizes that heroic deeds similar to Desiderius' were a frequently used topos in medieval chronicles when narrating the events of a losing military campaign. Veszprémy argues it is possible that Desiderius was only one of those knights, who stood around the king "like a stone wall", as the Illuminated Chronicle narrates, protecting Charles from the hail of arrows and stones, and was killed there.

Desiderius and his unidentified wife had a son Henry (or Héder), who – according to historian Pál Engel – inherited the lordship of Zaránd County with its accessories, including Világos Castle after his father's death. In September 1331, Desiderius' widow and son jointly leased and donated the ispánate, the castle of Világos and its accessories – villages Világos, Galsa (Galșa), Meszt (Mâsca), Füzes and Appadsig with a mill along the river Chigere – to a certain magister Anthony. Historian Annamária Bartha argues Henry was granted Zaránd County as perpetual ispánate because of Desiderius' heroic death. Pál Engel considered the donation letter was, in fact, the appointment of Anthony as vice-ispán of the county. In contrast, Attila Zsoldos argues that Henry donated the county and its accessories without royal approval by violating the system of honor, whereby his officials were entitled to enjoy all revenues accrued from their offices, but only for the time they held those offices. Zsoldos emphasizes that Lawrence Nagymartoni was already referred to as ispán of Zaránd County in May 1332, just half a year after the contract, and Henry never gained any dignities in the royal court despite his father saved the life of Charles in the Battle of Posada. Tibor Szőcs considers that Henry was still a minor in 1331, because his mother was also mentioned as a person acting in the donation letter. He also adds that the charter was issued in the kingdom's capital Visegrád, which weakens Zsoldos' argument. Consequently, Szőcs argues that Charles I granted Zaránd County and its accessories to Desiderius' widow and minor son, who appointed Anthony as their vice-ispán. For some reasons, the relationship has deteriorated between Henry and the monarch, who, therefore, annulled the previous donation. While Henry and his descendants remained insignificant nobles, the offspring of Desiderius' brother Nicholas elevated into the most powerful dignities for the upcoming decades. Desiderius' branch became extinct by the early 15th century.

== Sources ==
=== Primary sources ===
- The Hungarian Illuminated Chronicle: Chronica de Gestis Hungarorum (Edited by Dezső Dercsényi) (1970). Corvina, Taplinger Publishing. ISBN 0-8008-4015-1.

=== Secondary studies ===
- Bartha, Annamária (2015). "A királynéi udvarbírói tisztség és viselői Károly Róbert uralkodása idején [The Judges of the Queen's Court and During the Reign of Charles I (1301–1342)]". In Tóber, Márta; Maléth, Ágnes (eds.). Középkortörténeti tanulmányok 8 (in Hungarian). University of Szeged. pp. 91–103. ISBN 978-963-315-242-3.
- Engel, Pál (1996). Magyarország világi archontológiája, 1301–1457, I. [Secular Archontology of Hungary, 1301–1457, Volume I] (in Hungarian). História, MTA Történettudományi Intézete. ISBN 963-8312-44-0.
- Karácsonyi, János (1901). A magyar nemzetségek a XIV. század közepéig. II. kötet [The Hungarian genera until the middle of the 14th century, Vol. 2] (in Hungarian). Hungarian Academy of Sciences.
- Szőcs, Tibor (2020). "Az Anjou elit kormányzati feladatai [The Government Task of the Angevin Elite]". In Csukovits, Enikő (ed.). Az Anjou-kor hatalmi elitje (in Hungarian). MTA Bölcsészettudományi Kutatóközpont. pp. 165–188. ISBN 978-963-416-212-4.
- Varga, Virág (2023). "A Héder nembeli Héderváriak társadalmi helyzete a 13–14. század fordulóján [The Social Status of the Hédervári Family of the Héder genus at the Turn of the 13–14th Centuries]". In Hunyadi, Sándor; et al. (eds.). Micae Mediaevales XII (in Hungarian). Eötvös Loránd University. pp. 133–155. ISSN 2062-2198.
- Veszprémy, László; Somogyi, Gréta (2014). "Károly Róbert magyar király 1330. évi havasalföldi hadjárata és az ún. posadai csata historiográfiája [King Charles Robert of Hungary's Wallachian Campaign of 1330 and the Historiography of the So-called Battle of Posada]". Hadtörténelmi Közlemények (in Hungarian). 127 (1). Hadtörténeti Intézet és Múzeum: 23–40. ISSN 0017-6540.
- Veszprémy, László (2016). "A "posadai" csata. Károly Róbert 1330-as havasalföldi hadjárata [The Battle of "Posada". Charles Robert's Wallachian Campaign of 1330]". In Pósán, László; Veszprémy, László (eds.). Elfeledett háborúk. Középkori csaták és várostromok (6–16. század) (in Hungarian). Zrínyi Kiadó. pp. 232–246. ISBN 978-963-3276-96-9.
- Zsoldos, Attila (2013). "Üres honor [Empty Honour]". In Kádár, Zsófia; Lakatos, Bálint; Zarnóczki, Áron (eds.). Archivariorum historicorumque magistra. Történeti tanulmányok Bak Borbála tanárnő 70. születésnapjára (in Hungarian). Magyar Levéltárosok Egyesülete. pp. 455–477. ISBN 978-963-87475-3-2.

Desiderius House of Hédervári Born: ? Died: 12 November 1330
Political offices
Preceded by James Borsa	Ispán of Zaránd; 1318–1330	Succeeded by Henry Hédervári
Preceded by Mikcs Ákos	Judge of the Queen's Court; 1323–1330	Succeeded by Paul Garai
Preceded by Mikcs Ákos	Ispán of Sopron; 1326–1330	Succeeded by Stephen Losonci
Preceded by Nicholas Hédervári	Ispán of Győr; 1330	Succeeded by Blaise Fonyi
