= Simon II Nagymartoni =

Hungarian lord

Simon (II) Nagymartoni
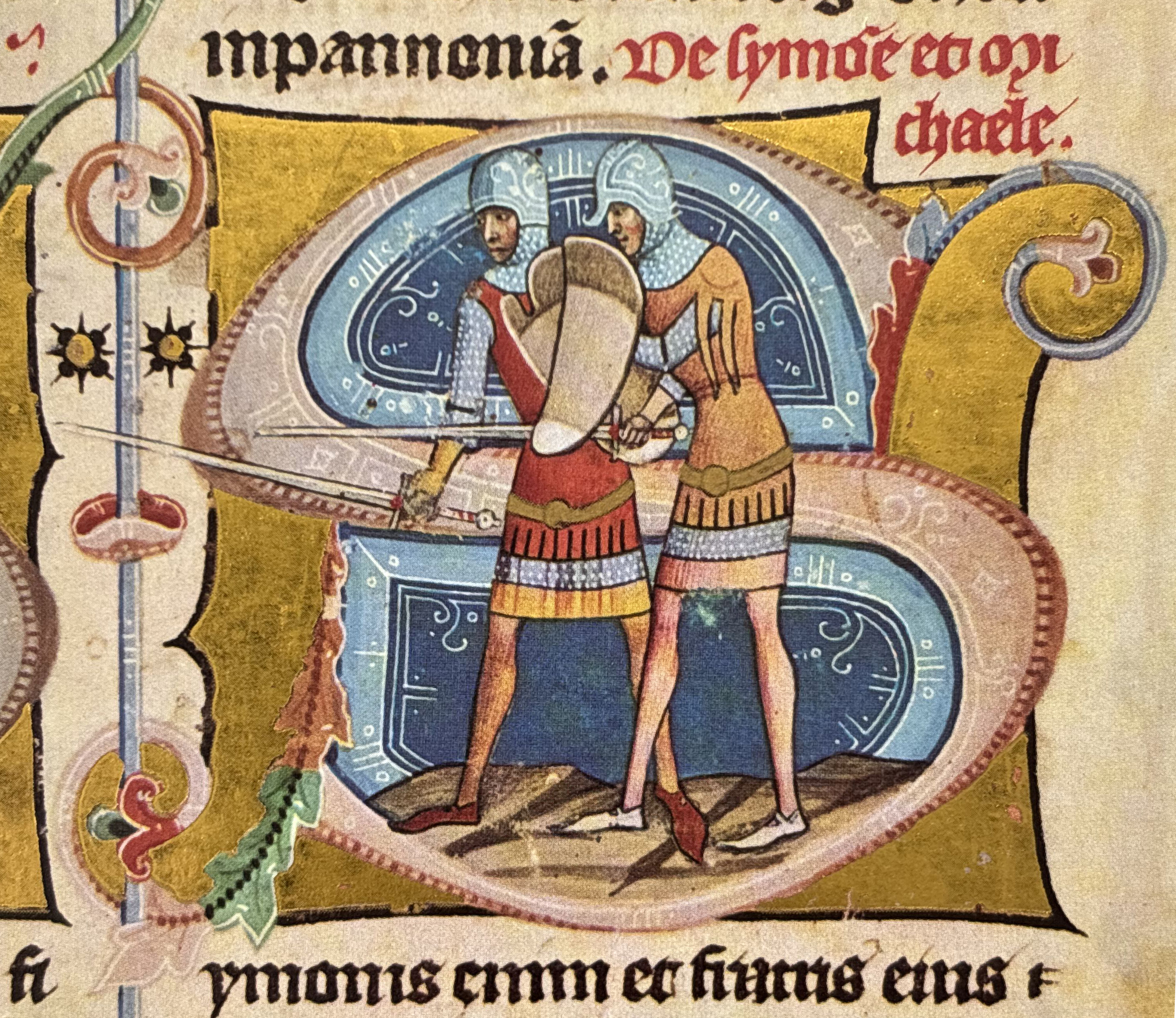
- Simon and Michael Nagymartoni, depicted in the 14th-century Illuminated Chronicle

Ispán of Bars
- Reign: 1277–1278
- Predecessor: Stephen Csák
- Successor: Demetrius Hont-Pázmány
- Died: after 1304
- Noble family: House of Nagymartoni
- Issue: Paul I Lawrence; Clara
- Father: Simon I Nagymartoni

Simon (II) Nagymartoni (also Martinsdorfi, Hungarian: Nagymartoni (II.) Simon; died after 1304) was a Hungarian lord in the second half of the 13th century, who served as ispán of Bars County from 1277 to 1278.

== Family ==
Simon (II) was born into the prestigious Nagymartoni family (also known as Bajóti) of Aragonese origin, as the elder son of knight Simon (I). He had a brother Michael, in sources, they often appear together. Both chroniclers Ákos and Simon of Kéza were their contemporaries, as a result they referred to the Nagymartoni family as "the kindred of [Count] Simon and his brother [Count] Michael in their works. The 14th-century Illuminated Chronicle also depicted Simon and Michael in knight's armor.

From his marriage with an unidentified noble lady, Simon had three children. The eldest one Paul (I) rose to the highest of the family members, when he served as Judge royal for two decades, from 1328 to 1349. Lawrence functioned as ispán of Zaránd County between 1332 and 1338, the "German branch" of the Nagymartonis (later Fraknóis) descended from him. Simon's only daughter Clara married the military leader Alexander Köcski, Paul's predecessor in the position of Judge royal.

== Career ==
Simon first appears in contemporary records in 1277, when he and Michael requested King Ladislaus IV of Hungary to confirm the former land donation of Csenke in Esztergom County (laid near present-day Mužla, Slovakia) in favor of their late father. Simon served as ispán of Bars County from 1277 to 1278. The brothers acquired several lands in Western Transdanubia along the border with the Duchy of Austria. For instance, in the period between 1287 and 1302, they bought Kövesd for 300 silver marks, Bogyoszló (present-day Deutschkreutz, Austria), Gorbolnok, seven portions in Zillingtal (present-day Austria), Péternémeti (present-day a borough of Kobersdorf in Austria), Sikrems and Ikka, all in Sopron County along the river Leitha. Simon and Michael built fortified stone castles in their ancient estates Nagymarton (or Mattersdorf, present-day Mattersburg, Austria) in Sopron County and Bajót in Esztergom County sometime in the 1270–1280s.

Since the early 1280s, the powerful Kőszegi family gradually extended their influence over Western Transdanubia, including Sopron County. According to historian Gyula Kristó, Ivan Kőszegi brought whole Sopron County under his jurisdiction and annexed it to his emerging oligarchic province by 1285, when several local nobles were mentioned as his familiares. When Nicholas Kőszegi donated a land to the Klostermarienberg Abbey (Borsmonostor, today part of Mannersdorf an der Rabnitz, Austria) in 1285, both Simon and Michael, among others (for instance, Lawrence Aba), appeared as witnesses and were referred to as "cari nostri" ("our dear"), reflecting their political allegiance, as they were forced to enter the Kőszegis' service by then. Although the document was later proved to be non-authentic, historian Attila Zsoldos accepted its content regarding the list of familiares.

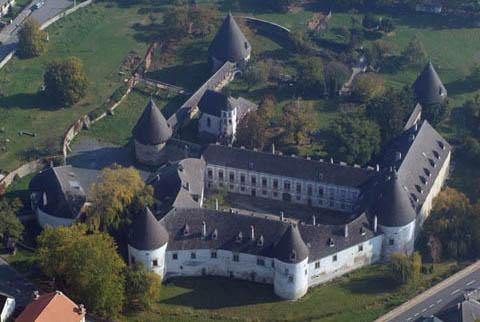
The castle of Kobersdorf in Austria

In retaliation of the Kőszegis' consecutive plundering attacks on Austrian soil, Albert I, Duke of Austria launched a massive military campaign ("Güssing Feud"; German: Güssinger Fehde) with his 15,000-size army against the Kőszegis and their familiares' castles and forts in the spring of 1289. In the first stage of the campaign, the Austrian troops commanded by Hugo von Taufert surrounded and besieged the fort of Nagymarton defended by Simon and Michael for 11 days. Although Ivan Kőszegi sent auxiliary troops to repel the attackers, but it failed to liberate the castle. Simon and Michael were forced to surrender the fortress in exchange for a free departure on 15 May 1289. The brothers retreated into their possessions in Esztergom County pro tempore. The Austrians captured at least 30 fortresses and settlements along the western border by the end of the war.

When Andrew III, with the support of the Kőszegis, ascended the Hungarian throne in 1290, he promised to recover the occupied castles and lands from Austria. In 1291, Andrew III invaded Austria, forcing Albert to withdraw his garrisons from the towns and fortresses, including Nagymarton, that he had captured two years before. Both Simon and Michael participated in the campaign. The Peace of Hainburg, which concluded the war, was signed on 26 August 1291. The peace treaty prescribed the destruction of the fortresses that Albert of Austria had seized from the Kőszegis and his allies. Simon put up with it and handed the fort of Nagymarton over to the king's officials. By 1294, the castle was demolished. As a compensation, Andrew III donated the royal land of Schattendorf to Simon and Michael, and confirmed their right of ownership over Röjtökör in Sopron County (present-day Neudörfl, Austria). In contrast of the Nagymartonis' behavior, the Kőszegis rose up in open rebellion against Andrew III in spring 1292. Simon and Michael attended the 1299 national diet. To compensate for the loss of Nagymarton, Simon bought the castle of Kabold (present-day Kobersdorf, Austria) in early 14th century from the Austrian owner, who acquired the fort after the "Güssing Feud" (although, the original proprietors Stephen II then Peter III Csák laid claim). The brothers paid the dowry of the widow of their late uncle Bertrand Nagymartoni in 1302. Both Simon and Michael last appear in contemporary records in April 1304, when they exchanged a land with Ivan Kőszegi.

== Sources ==
- Engel, Pál (1996). Magyarország világi archontológiája, 1301–1457, I [Secular Archontology of Hungary, 1301–1457, Volume I] (in Hungarian). História, MTA Történettudományi Intézete. ISBN 963-8312-44-0.
- Kristó, Gyula (1969). "A locsmándi várispánság és felbomlása [The Royal Castle Ispánate of Locsmánd and its Dissolution]". Soproni Szemle (in Hungarian). 23 (2). Soproni Városszépítő Egyesület: 131–144. ISSN 0133-0748.
- Pór, Antal (1889). "A Nagy-Martoniak [The Nagymartonis]". Turul (in Hungarian). 7 (2): 57–70. ISSN 1216-7258.
- Zsoldos, Attila (2009). "A Nagymartoniak: egy aragóniai család Magyarországon [The Nagymartonis: an Aragonese Family in Hungary]". In Tóth, Csaba; Sarobe, Ramon (eds.). Királylányok messzi földről. Magyarország és Katalónia a középkorban (in Hungarian). Hungarian National Museum. pp. 177–189. ISBN 978-963-706-164-6.
- Zsoldos, Attila (2011). Magyarország világi archontológiája, 1000–1301 [Secular Archontology of Hungary, 1000–1301] (in Hungarian). História, MTA Történettudományi Intézete. ISBN 978-963-9627-38-3.

Simon II House of Nagymartoni Born: ? Died: after 1304
Political offices
Preceded by Stephen Csák	Ispán of Bars; 1277–1278	Succeeded by Demetrius Hont-Pázmány
