= Nicholas I Hédervári =

Hungarian nobleman (died 1330)

Nicholas (I) Hédervári

Ispán of Győr
- Reign: 1324–1330
- Predecessor: Paul Nagymartoni (?)
- Successor: Desiderius Hédervári
- Died: February/May 1330
- Noble family: House of Hédervári
- Issue: Stephen I Nicholas II
- Father: Denis III Héder

Nicholas (I) Hédervári (Hungarian: Hédervári (I.) Miklós; died February/May 1330) was a Hungarian nobleman in the early 14th century, who served as ispán of Győr County from 1324 until his death. The powerful and wealthy Hédervári (or Héderváry) family descended from him.

== Family and career ==
Nicholas (I) originated from the Hédervár branch of the gens (clan) Héder, as the son of Denis (III) "the White-headed". He had two brothers, Desiderius and Andrew, who died in 1330 and 1326, respectively. By the end of the 1310s, Desiderius became an illustrious member of the royal court of Charles I of Hungary, who also supported Nicholas' social advance. Nicholas was the father of Stephen (I) and Nicholas (II). The Héderváris spread from both of them. The most prestigious and so-called palatinal branch descended from Nicholas (II).

According to a charter from 1330, Desiderius and Nicholas were granted the possession of Bodak in Győr County (present-day Bodíky in Slovakia) by King Ladislaus IV of Hungary. Nicholas first appears in contemporary records in 1309, when bought a portion of the estate Fornad in Pozsony County from members of the gens (clan) Apor. The estate laid along the border between Győr and Pozsony counties, near the ancient clan estate Hédervár. During his life, Nicholas remained marginal in comparison with his brother Desiderius, whose career was on a bright upward trajectory during the reign of Charles I. Nicholas was appointed ispán of Győr County in 1324. Desiderius, Nicholas and Andrew agreed to accept the last will and testament of their cousin Nicholas in 1326. Desiderius and Nicholas were involved in a lawsuit with local udvornici regarding the possession rights over Bodak. In February 1330, they settled with the plaintiffs defining the border between the estates and regarding the payment of local river custom duties. Nicholas died soon. He was succeeded as ispán by his brother Desiderius, who is first mentioned in this capacity in May 1330. Desiderius was soon killed in the Battle of Posada in November 1330, temporarily blocking the rise of the family. Nicholas' namesake son fought in many royal campaigns of Louis I of Hungary, thus the Hédervári family returned to the aristocratic elite two or three decades later, and remained there until their extinction in the 17th century.

== Sources ==
- Engel, Pál (1996). Magyarország világi archontológiája, 1301–1457, I. [Secular Archontology of Hungary, 1301–1457, Volume I] (in Hungarian). História, MTA Történettudományi Intézete. ISBN 963-8312-44-0.
- Szőcs, Tibor (2020). "Az Anjou elit kormányzati feladatai [The Government Task of the Angevin Elite]". In Csukovits, Enikő (ed.). Az Anjou-kor hatalmi elitje (in Hungarian). MTA Bölcsészettudományi Kutatóközpont. pp. 165–188. ISBN 978-963-416-212-4.
- Varga, Virág (2023). "A Héder nembeli Héderváriak társadalmi helyzete a 13–14. század fordulóján [The Social Status of the Hédervári Family of the Héder genus at the Turn of the 13–14th Centuries]". In Hunyadi, Sándor; et al. (eds.). Micae Mediaevales XII (in Hungarian). Eötvös Loránd University. pp. 133–155. ISSN 2062-2198.

Nicholas I House of Hédervári Born: ? Died: February/May 1330
Political offices
Preceded by Paul Nagymartoni (?)	Ispán of Győr; 1324–1330	Succeeded by Desiderius Hédervári
