= Lawrence Nagymartoni =

Ispán of Zaránd
- Reign: 1332–1338
- Predecessor: Henry Hédervári
- Successor: Morochuk
- Died: between 1340 and 1342
- Noble family: House of Nagymartoni
- Spouse: Margaret Haschendorfer
- Issue: Nicholas II; Bartholomew II; Catherine
- Father: Simon II Nagymartoni

Lawrence Nagymartoni (also Fraknói, Hungarian: Nagymartoni Lőrinc; died between 1340 and 1342) was a Hungarian nobleman and soldier in the first half of the 14th century. He served as ispán of Zaránd County from 1332 to 1338.

== Family ==
He was born into the Nagymartoni (also known as Bajóti, and later Fraknói) family of Aragonese origin, as the younger son of Simon II, who functioned as ispán of Bars County between 1277 and 1278. Lawrence's elder brother was Paul (I), who served as Judge royal from 1328 to 1349. They cooperated closely together to express their political and military aspirations. They also had a sister, Clara, who married military commander Alexander Köcski.

Lawrence married Margaret Haschendorfer in 1325. She was a daughter of Austrian noble Wulfing I Haschendorfer, whose other daughter Elizabeth was the wife of Kónya Szécsényi. They had two sons, Nicholas (II) – also known as Nicholas "the German" – and Bartholomew (II), and a daughter Catherine, the wife of Emeric II Lackfi.

== Career ==
Along with several Transdanubian noble families, Paul and Lawrence were also forced to join the familia of the powerful Kőszegi family. For a long time, the brothers did not commit themselves to support Charles I of Hungary in the civil war because of their delicate situation. When the king launched a campaign against the Kőszegis in Transdanubia and Slavonia in the first half of 1316, the Nagymartonis took an oath of allegiance to Charles. Therefore, their possessions were pillaged and burned by the Kőszegi mercenaries, while their former lord Andrew Kőszegi besieged and seized the castle of Kabold (present-day Kobersdorf, Austria). When Andrew Kőszegi attacked the towns of Sopron and Győr, which refused to acknowledge his supremacy, in the winter of 1317, the burghers successfully repelled the offense with the assistance of the troops of his former familiares, Paul and Lawrence Nagymartoni. However, around the same time, Peter Csák pillaged and destroyed their castle of Bajót in Esztergom County, which was never rebuilt.

For their loyalty and bravery, Paul and Lawrence regained the castle of Kabold by Charles in 1319, who seized the fort from the Kőszegis in his military campaign. Around the same time, the brothers built the first known castle of Forchtenstein (Hungarian: Fraknó). The fortress became the family's new household, which, therefore adopted the Fraknói surname by the mid-14th century. During his wedding to Margaret Haschendorfer in 1325, Lawrence was referred to as a royal squire. He handed over portions and attached revenues in the estates in Besenyő (Pöttsching, Austria), Ikka, Heflán (Großhöflein, Austria), Kövesd and Szerdahely as dower to his wife.

Lawrence participated in the Battle of Posada against the Wallachians in November 1330. The skirmish resulted in a serious Hungarian defeat. Lawrence was wounded by a spear stab and suffered four other life-threatening injuries. He was captured and imprisoned for a year in the captivity of Basarab I of Wallachia until 1331, when the ransom was paid and he was able to return home. For his bravery, Charles I appointed him castellan of Pankota in Zaránd County in 1331 (present-day Pâncota, Romania). He served as ispán of Zaránd County from 1332 to 1338. He acted as a pristaldus (royal bailiff or commissioner) between 1339 and 1340. Lawrence died sometime between 1340 and 1342. The so-called "German branch" of the Nagymartoni (Fraknói) family descended from Lawrence.

== Sources ==
- Engel, Pál (1996). Magyarország világi archontológiája, 1301–1457, I. [Secular Archontology of Hungary, 1301–1457, Volume I] (in Hungarian). História, MTA Történettudományi Intézete. ISBN 963-8312-44-0.
- Pór, Antal (1889). "A Nagy-Martoniak [The Nagymartonis]". Turul (in Hungarian). 7 (2): 57–70. ISSN 1216-7258.
- Veszprémy, László; Somogyi, Gréta (2014). "Károly Róbert magyar király 1330. évi havasalföldi hadjárata és az ún. posadai csata historiográfiája [King Charles Robert of Hungary's Wallachian Campaign of 1330 and the Historiography of the So-called Battle of Posada]". Hadtörténelmi Közlemények (in Hungarian). 127 (1). Hadtörténeti Intézet és Múzeum: 23–40. ISSN 0017-6540.
- Zsoldos, Attila (2009). "A Nagymartoniak: egy aragóniai család Magyarországon [The Nagymartonis: an Aragonese Family in Hungary]". In Tóth, Csaba; Sarobe, Ramon (eds.). Királylányok messzi földről. Magyarország és Katalónia a középkorban (in Hungarian). Hungarian National Museum. pp. 177–189. ISBN 978-963-706-164-6.

Lawrence House of Nagymartoni Born: ? Died: 1340/1342
Political offices
Preceded by Henry Hédervári	Ispán of Zaránd; 1332–1338	Succeeded by Morochuk
