= Henry Hédervári =

Hungarian nobleman

Ispán of Zaránd
- Reign: 1330–1331
- Predecessor: Desiderius Hédervári
- Successor: Lawrence Nagymartoni
- Died: after 1339
- Noble family: House of Hédervári
- Spouses: 1, unidentified 2, unidentified
- Issue: (1) Nicholas (2) James (2) John (2) Anne
- Father: Desiderius Hédervári

Henry Hédervári (Hungarian: Hédervári Henrik; died after 1339) was a Hungarian nobleman in the 14th century, a member of the prestigious Hédervári family. He briefly served as (titular) ispán of Zaránd County from 1330 to 1331.

== Life ==
Henry (or Héder) was the only known son of Desiderius Hédervári and his unidentified wife. Desiderius was killed in the Battle of Posada in November 1330, when sacrificed his life to enable the King Charles I of Hungary's escape after changing his armor with the king, according to the narration of the near-contemporary Illuminated Chronicle.

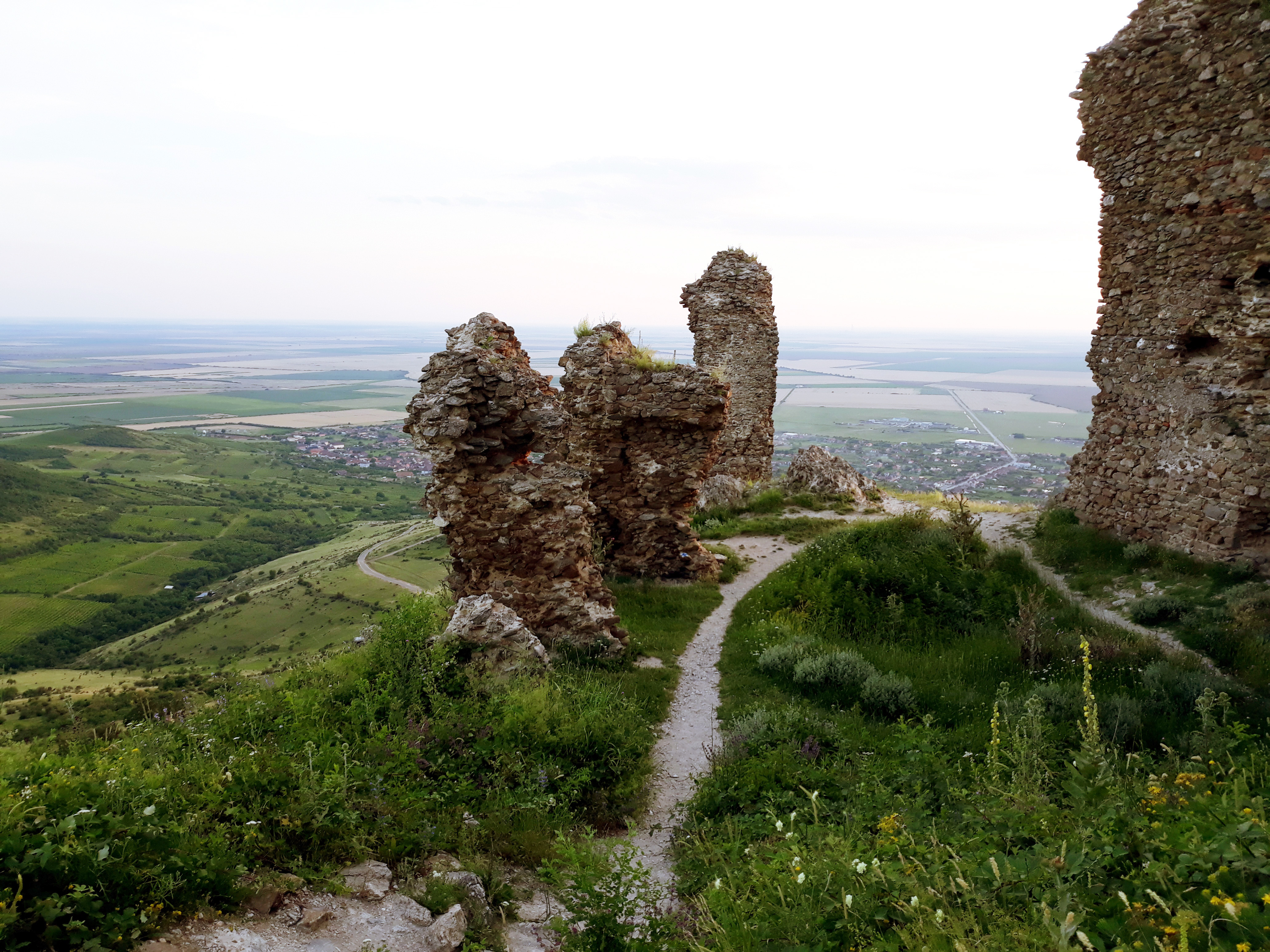
Világos Castle, today ruins near Șiria, Romania

After Desiderius' death, Henry – according to historian Pál Engel – inherited the lordship of Zaránd County with its accessories, including Világos Castle (today ruins in Șiria, Romania). Henry became nominal ispán of Zaránd County still in that year. In September 1331, Henry and his mother jointly leased and donated the ispánate, the castle of Világos and its accessories – villages Világos, Galsa (Galșa), Meszt (Mâsca), Füzes and Appadsig with a mill along the river Chigere – to a certain magister Anthony. It is possible that Henry was granted Zaránd County as perpetual ispánate because of Desiderius' heroic death. Pál Engel considered the donation letter was, in fact, the appointment of Anthony as vice-ispán of the county. In contrast, Attila Zsoldos argues that Henry donated the county and its accessories without royal approval by violating the system of honor, whereby his officials were entitled to enjoy all revenues accrued from their offices, but only for the time they held those offices. Zsoldos emphasizes that Lawrence Nagymartoni was already referred to as ispán of Zaránd County in May 1332, just half a year after the contract, and Henry never gained any dignities in the royal court despite his father saved the life of Charles in the Battle of Posada. Tibor Szőcs considers that Henry was still a minor in 1331, because his mother was also mentioned as a person acting in the donation letter. He also adds that the charter was issued in the kingdom's capital Visegrád, which weakens Zsoldos' argument. Consequently, Szőcs argues that Charles I granted Zaránd County and its accessories to Desiderius' widow and minor son, who appointed Anthony as their vice-ispán. For some reasons (perhaps because of Henry's potential greed for heritage), the relationship has deteriorated between Henry and the monarch, who, therefore, annulled the previous donation.

Henry reached adulthood by the summer of 1332. While his cousins elevated into the highest dignities of the royal court, Henry remained marginal. This is demonstrated by the fact that while his cousins – Nicholas II and Stephen I – were styled as "magister", Henry was referred without any social rank during a contract within the family in 1336. He was last mentioned as a living person in 1339.

== Family ==
Henry married twice, his eldest son Nicholas was much more older than his younger brothers and sister. Nicholas was involved in a series of lawsuits against the Amadé de Várkony family in 1350 and 1352. It is possible he is identical with that Nicholas, son of Henry, who functioned as a canon of the Diocese of Veszprém in 1358. Henry's younger sons, James and John first appeared in contemporary records in the 1370s. They were also local nobles without political significance, in contrary to the senior branch of the Hédervári family. They unsuccessfully appealed to divide the clan's landholdings with the other branch in 1378. Henry's only daughter Anne (fl. 1373) married Stephen, the son of James, who served as judge (mayor) of Pressburg (present-day Bratislava, Slovakia).

Henry's son James married a certain Catherine (fl. 1378), then Euphrosyne Telegdi (fl. 1407), the daughter of Nicholas Telegdi, who served as Master of the doorkeepers from 1382 to 1384. James had a daughter Clara, the wife of Nicholas Bazini. James was a courtier of Sigismund of Luxembourg, King of Hungary in September 1402. He was one of the 112 nobles in that year, who testified and countersigned the mutual succession contract between Sigismund and Albert IV, Duke of Austria. James had no known male descendants, he was last mentioned as a living person in 1411. Desiderius' branch became extinct shortly thereafter.

== Sources ==
- Engel, Pál (1996). Magyarország világi archontológiája, 1301–1457, I. [Secular Archontology of Hungary, 1301–1457, Volume I] (in Hungarian). História, MTA Történettudományi Intézete. ISBN 963-8312-44-0.
- Szőcs, Tibor (2020). "Az Anjou elit kormányzati feladatai [The Government Task of the Angevin Elite]". In Csukovits, Enikő (ed.). Az Anjou-kor hatalmi elitje (in Hungarian). MTA Bölcsészettudományi Kutatóközpont. pp. 165–188. ISBN 978-963-416-212-4.
- Zsoldos, Attila (2013). "Üres honor [Empty Honour]". In Kádár, Zsófia; Lakatos, Bálint; Zarnóczki, Áron (eds.). Archivariorum historicorumque magistra. Történeti tanulmányok Bak Borbála tanárnő 70. születésnapjára (in Hungarian). Magyar Levéltárosok Egyesülete. pp. 455–477. ISBN 978-963-87475-3-2.

Henry House of Hédervári Born: ? Died: after 1339
Political offices
Preceded by Desiderius Hédervári	Ispán of Zaránd; 1330–1331	Succeeded by Lawrence Nagymartoni
