= Kráľovská lúka =

Nature monument in the municipality of Bodíky, Slovakia

Coordinates: 47.90434°N 17.50135°E

- IUCN category III (natural monument or feature)
- Interactive map of Kráľovská lúka
- Area: 0.324 km^{2}
- Established: 1975
- Governing body: ŠOP - S-CHKO Dunajské luhy

Kráľovská lúka is a nature monument in the Slovak municipality of Bodíky in the Dunajská Streda District. The nature reserve covers an area of 32.4 ha of the Danube floodplain area. It has a protection level of 5 under the Slovak nature protection system. The nature reserve is part of the Dunajské luhy Protected Landscape Area.

== Description ==
The nature monument is formed by a dead branch of the Danube with a stands of typical floodplain forests. The water, swamp and meadow biotopes give home to rare species of flora including the Nymphaea alba and the Galanthus nivalis.
