= Győrság =

- Flag Coat of arms

- Location of Győr-Moson-Sopron county in Hungary

- Location of Győrság
- Coordinates: 47.57561°N 17.75305°E
- Country: Hungary
- County: Győr-Moson-Sopron

Area
  - Total: 8.2 km^{2} (3.2 sq mi)

Population (2004)
  - Total: 1,505
  - Density: 183.53/km^{2} (475.3/sq mi)
- Time zone: UTC+1 (CET)
  - Summer (DST): UTC+2 (CEST)
- Postal code: 9084
- Area code: 96

Győrság is a village in Győr-Moson-Sopron county, Hungary.
