= Paul Nagymartoni =

Hungarian nobleman

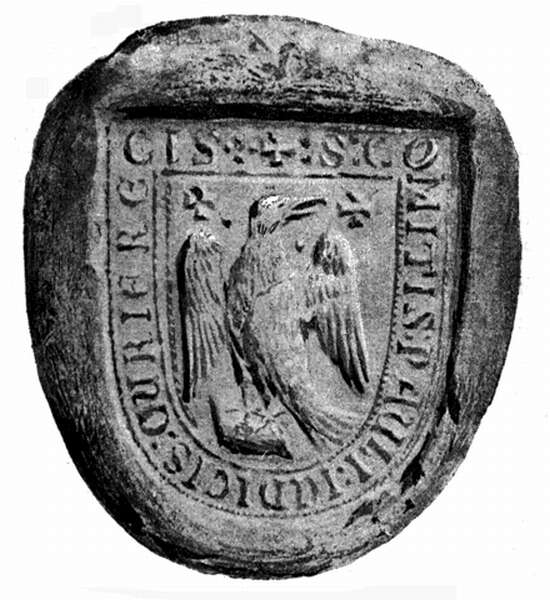
- Seal of Paul Nagymartoni

Judge royal
- Reign: 1328–1349
- Predecessor: Alexander Köcski
- Successor: Thomas Szécsényi
- Died: June 1351
- Noble family: House of Nagymartoni
- Spouses: 1, Elizabeth von Pottendorf; 2, Elizabeth Puchaim (m. 1343)
- Issue: Anne
- Father: Simon II Nagymartoni

Paul Nagymartoni (also Mertensdorfi, Hungarian: Nagymartoni Pál, German: Paul von Mattersdorf or Paul von Forchtenstein, French: Paul de Ferchiton; died June 1351) was an influential Hungarian nobleman and jurist in the first half of the 14th century, who served as Judge royal from 1328 to 1349.

He was a loyal partisan of Charles I, who strengthened royal power after decades of civil wars and feudal anarchy. Under Nagymartoni, the prestige of his position was restored. He established a professional staff and bureau on a permanent basis, initiating structural and judicial reforms. After 21 years in office, he was dismissed by Louis I.

== Family ==
He was born into the Nagymartoni (also known as Bajóti, and later Fraknói) family of Aragonese origin, as the son of Simon II, who functioned as ispán of Bars County between 1277 and 1278. Paul's grandfather Simon I and his siblings arrived to Hungary as members of the escort of Queen Constance of Aragon, who married King Emeric of Hungary in 1198. The family owned Bajót and subsequently Nagymarton (today in Burgenland, Austria, by its present–day name Mattersburg). Paul had a brother, Lawrence, who participated in Charles' various campaigns and married Margaret Haschendorfer, a daughter of Austrian noble Wulfing I Haschendorfer, whose other daughter Elizabeth was the wife of Kónya Szécsényi. Paul's sister Clara married Alexander Köcski, also a renowned soldier. Thus Nagymartoni had kinship relationship with both of his predecessor Köcski and successor Thomas Szécsényi in the dignity of Judge royal.

Nagymartoni married twice; his first wife was Elizabeth von Pottendorf (fl. 1325). After her death, Nagymartoni married Elizabeth Puchaim with royal permission in 1343. Her father was Austrian noble Henry Puchaim, whose other daughter Agnes was the wife of powerful lord Stephen Lackfi. Paul had a daughter Anne, who married her relative Albert Puchaim.

== Early life ==
Nagymartoni was first mentioned by contemporary records in 1307, when bought Péli (today a borough of Bajót) together with his cousin John. His tutor was Giffredus de Giffredis, formerly a scholar at the University of Bologna (he was approximately 60 years old in 1345). Nagymartoni's lands laid in Sopron County, which were constantly threatened by two neighboring powerful oligarchic powers, Matthew Csák and the Kőszegi family. Along with several Transdanubian noble families, Paul and Lawrence were also forced to join the Kőszegis' familia. For a long time, the brothers did not commit themselves to support Charles I in the civil war because of their delicate situation. When the king launched a campaign against the Kőszegis in Transdanubia and Slavonia in the first half of 1316, the Nagymartonis took an oath of allegiance to Charles. Therefore their possessions were pillaged and burned by the Kőszegi mercenaries, while their former lord Andrew Kőszegi besieged and seized the castle of Kabold (present-day Kobersdorf, Austria). When Andrew Kőszegi attacked the towns of Sopron and Győr, which refused to acknowledge his supremacy, in the winter of 1317, the burghers successfully repelled the offense with the assistance of the troops of his former familiares, Paul and Lawrence Nagymartoni. Following that, Paul defeated the army of Austrian duke Frederick the Fair, who also attacked from the western borderlands. However, around the same time, Peter Csák pillaged and destroyed their castle of Bajót in Esztergom County, which was never rebuilt. After the successful royal campaign against the Kőszegi family in 1317, when, among others, they lost Győr County, Nagymartoni was appointed to its ispán, restoring the position after two decades. He appeared in that capacity in a document issued on 10 July 1318, when took over the castle of Győr, which was confiscated from the diocese by the monarch due to its strategic importance against Matthew Csák.

For their loyalty and bravery, Paul and Lawrence regained the castle of Kabold by Charles in 1319, who seized the fort from the Kőszegis in his military campaign. Around the same time, the brothers built the first known castle of Forchtenstein (Hungarian: Fraknó). The fortress became the family's new household, which, therefore adopted the Fraknói surname by the mid-14th century. According to a document, Paul Nagymartoni invaded and plundered the land of Lábatlan in 1322. It is possible it was a counter-attack against the Csák dominion. In 1323, Nagymartoni was referred to as a member of the royal court, without holding any specific offices. He was among the signatory barons, who confirmed the peace treaty between Charles I of Hungary and Frederick the Fair with their seals in that year. He was styled as simply "magister" in early 1328, when he and his brother Lawrence implemented their brother-in-law Alexander Köcski's last will and testament, and donated certain lands and allowances to their sister, Clara.

== Judge royal ==
Following the death of Köcski, Paul Nagymartoni was made Judge royal on 5 March 1328 (but it is also possible that he had already held the dignity since 25 February). His 21-year of service in the position is the longest tenure in Medieval Hungary. Beside that he also functioned as castellan of Beszterce (today Považský hrad in Slovakia). As honors to his dignity, Nagymartoni also possessed the castles of Litva, Várna (Óvár) and Sztrecsény (present-day Lietava, Starhrad and Strečno in Slovakia, respectively). Historian Iván Bertényi Sr. called Nagymartoni's two-decade term as "the development of permanent of the institution of Judge royal". Nagymartoni participated in the war against the Duchy of Austria in the summer of 1336.

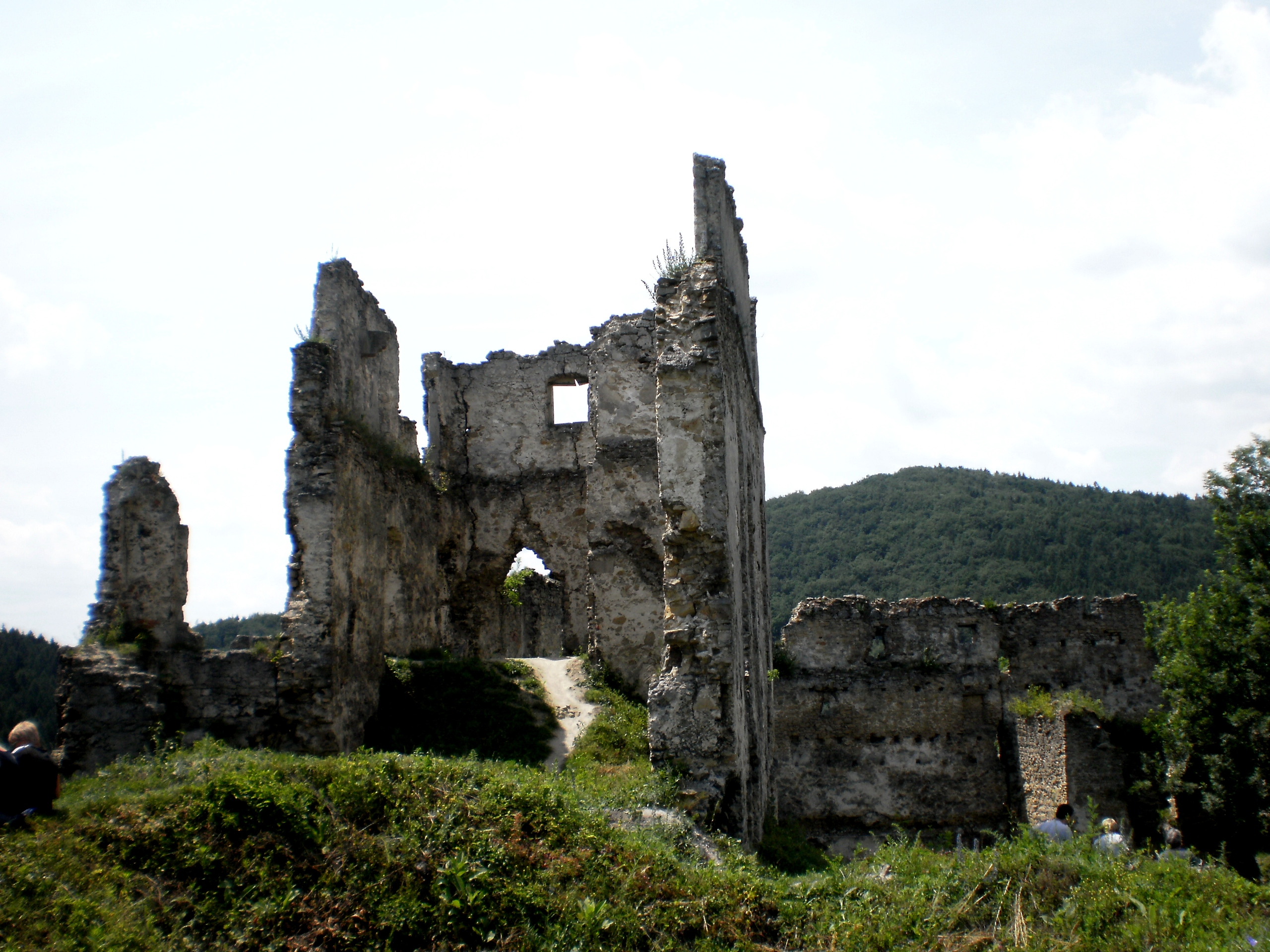
Beside his term as Judge royal, Paul Nagymartoni also served as castellan of Beszterce Castle (today Považský hrad in Slovakia) for more than twenty years

Altogether 3000 documents were preserved, which related to the judicial activity of Nagymartoni and his professional staff. Most of the times, Nagymartoni judged in lawsuits between nobles, in addition to cases of dominations. Occasionally, he was also involved in ecclesiastical affairs, when the ownership rights of church lands were disputed between two church entities. For instance, his court discussed the conflict over the tithe between the Abbey Pannonhalma and the Diocese of Veszprém in 1341, which legitimacy was questioned and contested by the latter's lawyers. In response, Nagymartoni stated that these issues "de facto fall under his competence". He also made decisions in lawsuits, where serfs were involved, but in decreasing numbers, as the rights of landlords gradually expanded in the era. The Banate of Slavonia was excluded from Nagymartoni's territorial jurisdiction according to the contemporary documents. However, Požega County, which laid on the border between Slavonia and Macsó, belonged to the competence of the Judge royal. Since 1340, Transylvania returned to the jurisdiction of the Judge royal after sixteen years, excluding some special administrative units in the province (e.g. Szolnok County). During Nagymartoni's tenure, the Banate of Severin also enjoyed the privilege of own judicial authority. Historian Tibor Almási demonstrated the diverse practice of his judicial activity through the text of a single diploma issued in June 1332, which narrated a lawsuit between John Cselenfi (and his brothers) and the Edelényi family regarding two lands belonged to the largely abandoned Borsod Castle prior to that.

Nagymartoni and his judicial court resided in the royal court in Visegrád, then Buda since January 1347, when Louis I temporarily moved there for years, but Visegrád retained its permanent capital status until 1408. His fine collectors worked on the basis of carefully recorded registers. However, there have been countless abuses of power and arbitrariness occurred during Nagymartoni's term, because King Charles had to adopt procedural requirements and restrictive rules in 1341, as a result of complaints following irregularities. There are several information on the members of his professional staff. His deputy was vice-judge royal was Desiderius Poki, who served in that capacity from 1329 until 1346. However he had more limited functions than his predecessors' authority at the turn of the 13th and 14th centuries, when the position reached its peak for a short time. It is presumable Poki was primarily responsible for the management of the ever-growing Nagymartoni landholdings. Paul Ugali was a long-time member of the judicial staff. He acted as chief notary (Hungarian: ítélőmester; Latin: protonotarius) and thus he was head of the judicial bureau, effectively the second most prominent member in the staff after Paul Nagymartoni. During his absence, Ugali took the daily affairs and guarded the Judge royal's grand seal. One of Nagymartoni's employees was notary James Szepesi, who himself also served as Judge royal in 1370s, as a high impact factor in the history of the dignity.

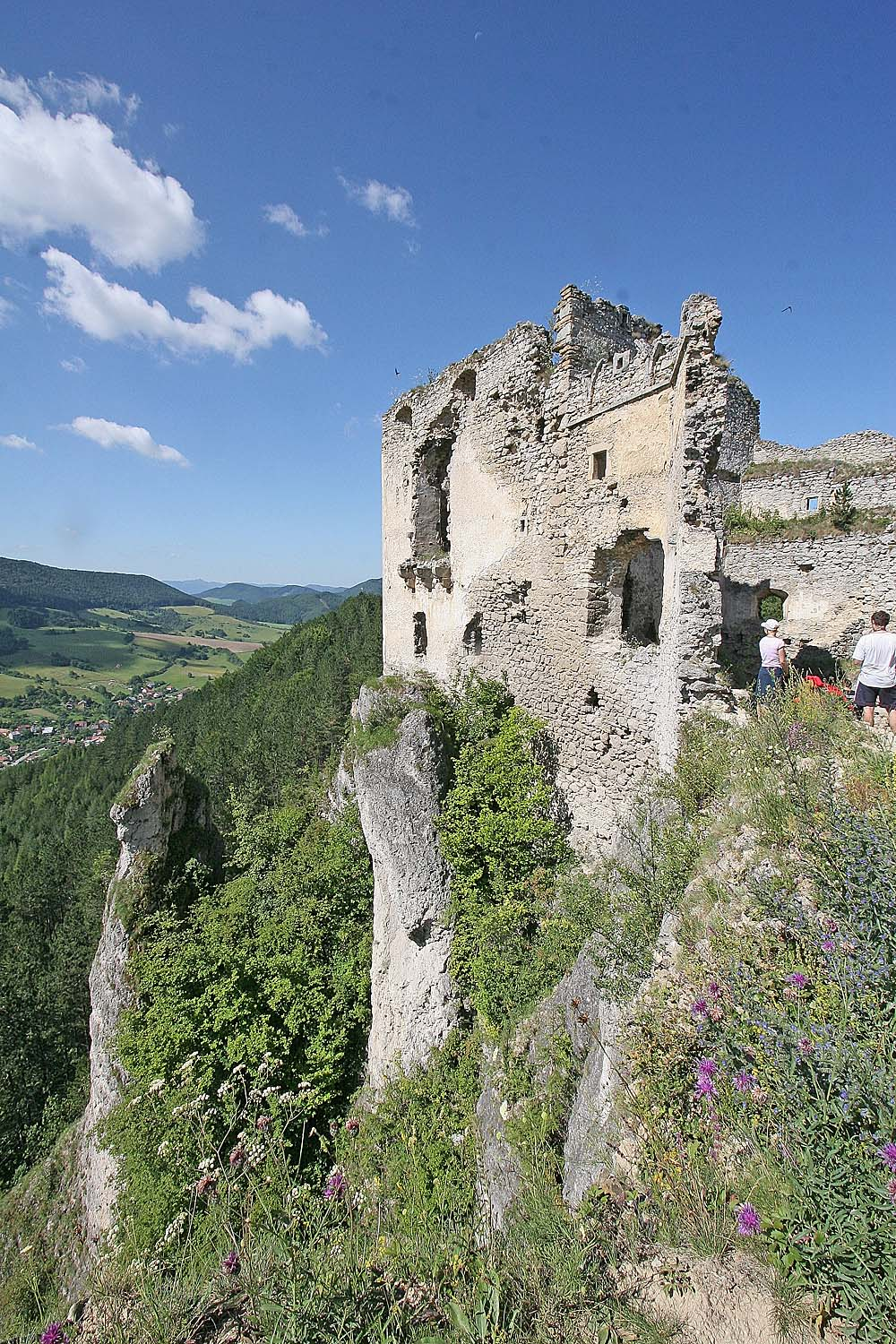
Nagymartoni owned Lietava Castle (present-day Slovakia) during his service as Judge royal

Five days after his father's death, Louis I was crowned King of Hungary on 21 July 1342. Soon, the young monarch re-appointed Nagymartoni in his position, as he was considered the king's personally appointed officer, whose mandate lasted until the death of his monarch or himself. In the following years, Nagymartoni and his staff were usually fell under the pressure of Queen mother Elizabeth of Poland, who exerted a powerful influence on her son for decades. This fact also affected some of Nagymartoni's judgments in the favor of Elizabeth during the various lawsuits in the 1340s. When the queen visited the Kingdom of Naples in the summer of 1343 to promote the interests of her second son, claimant Andrew, who was betrothed to Joanna I, Nagymartoni belonged to her escort. Subsequently, he traveled further to the papal court of Avignon as a member of the Hungarian delegation, led by Vid Vasvári, the Bishop of Nyitra. Pope Clement VI was the overlord of the Kingdom of Naples; in contrary to their hopes, they were only able to persuade him to promise that Andrew would be crowned as Joanna's husband. According to historian Erik Fügedi, Nagymartoni adopted his seal on a pattern of the cardinals' seal from Avignon, as it also contained a Maltese cross. Nagymartoni again participated in a diplomatic mission to the papal court in the first half of 1345. Alongside the other members of the mission, he was instructed to be present at the coronation of Duke Andrew as envoys of the Kingdom of Hungary, but the duke was murdered before the ceremony could be held. Following the assassination, Nagymartoni visited the Roman Curia in 1346, where he expressed the fierce protest of the Hungarian court.

Nagymartoni acquired rich, fertile and extensive lands during his two decades of tenure. According to a contract of estate division with his late brother Lawrence's branch in 1346, the family possessed the most of its lands in Sopron County. His main residence was the eponymous estate Nagymarton, where – due to his belonging to the elite – national fairs were held and Nagymartoni also erected a parish church dedicated to Saint Martin of Tours there. Beside the inherited possessions, like Nagymarton, Fraknó, Röjtökör or Siklósd (present-day Neudörfl and Sigleß in Austria, respectively), Paul Nagymartoni acquired Pomogy (present-day Pamhagen in Austria). He also had extensive landholdings in Esztergom County (e.g. Bajót, Kesző, Nyergesújfalu) and Nógrád County (Mohora and Oroszd). He acquired Széleskút in Pozsony County (present-day Sološnica in Slovakia) and several lands in Vas County. He also owned landholdings in Somogy, Komárom and Szabolcs counties. Summarizing, he owned approximately 50 estates throughout the country. In several occasions, he bought these lands, but in other cases, he misused his position, similarly to his contemporaries. For instance, during a lawsuit in 1337, he placed the lands of Sárfő and Csataj (present-day Blatné and Čataj in Slovakia, respectively) under lien, instead of imposing a fine. After the deadline, Nagymartoni himself paid the fine to the defendant and registered himself as the owner of the two lands, which laid in Pozsony County. In 1346, the two existing branches of the Nagymartoni family entered into an agreement of land division with each other. Regarding his possessions acquired by himself, Paul excluded the family of his late uncle Michael from the inheritance and made his nephew Nicholas "the German" (son of the deceased Lawrence) his only heir. Michael's grandson, Nicholas "the Hungarian" was granted half portions of the ancient family estates – e.g. Nagymarton, Fraknó, Bajót and Kabold –, which proved to be a generous deed from Paul, whereas in previous decades their modernization and strengthening was due only to him and Lawrence.

Louis I dismissed Nagymartoni and replaced him with the powerful baron Thomas Szécsényi in the summer of 1349, sometimes between 18 June and 8 July. According to historian Antal Pór, the king made his decision because of Nagymartoni's rapid wealth and the corruption allegations against him. It is also possible he became a political victim in the public sentiment before the adoption of the momentous 1351 Laws. A royal charter notes that Nagymartoni was replaced "after numerous complaints". Iván Bertényi also considered that Nagymartoni was dismissed because of his advanced age and declining health. Nagymartoni lost all political influence and retired from the royal court. He last appeared in contemporary records in November 1349, when acted as a co-judge with Szécsényi during a lawsuit. He died two years later, in June 1351. By the 1370s, his family turned against Louis I, enjoying support from the Austrian dukes. In parallel with this, they had been gradually Germanised.

== Sources ==
- Almási, Tibor (1995). "Az 1328. évi országbíróváltás okleveles adatai [Chartered Data on the 1328 Replacement in the Position of Judge Royal]". In Koszta, László (ed.). Kelet és Nyugat között: Történeti tanulmányok Kristó Gyula tiszteletére (in Hungarian). University of Szeged. pp. 19–37. ISBN 963-482-083-2.
- Almási, Tibor (2018). "Megjegyzések Nagymartoni Pál királyi országbíró pályájához és működéséhez, 1328–1349 [Notes to the Working Life and Activities of Pál Nagymartoni, Royal Lord Chief Justice (1328–1349)]". Forum Acta Juridica et Politica. 8 (2). University of Szeged: 3–34. ISSN 2063-2525.
- Bertényi, Iván (1976). Az országbírói intézmény története a XIV. században [History of the Institution of Judge Royal in the 14th Century] (in Hungarian). Hungarian Academy of Sciences. ISBN 963-05-0734-X.
- Engel, Pál (1996). Magyarország világi archontológiája, 1301–1457, I. [Secular Archontology of Hungary, 1301–1457, Volume I] (in Hungarian). História, MTA Történettudományi Intézete. ISBN 963-8312-44-0.
- Fügedi, Erik (1986). Ispánok, bárók, kiskirályok [Ispáns, Barons and Petty Kings]. Magvető. ISBN 963-14-0582-6.
- Markó, László (2006). A magyar állam főméltóságai Szent Istvántól napjainkig: Életrajzi Lexikon [Great Officers of State in Hungary from King Saint Stephen to Our Days: A Biographical Encyclopedia] (in Hungarian). Helikon Kiadó. ISBN 963-547-085-1.
- Sebők, Ferenc (2013). "Okleveles adatok az 1349. évi országbíróváltás történetéhez [Chartered Data on the 1349 Replacement in the Position of Judge Royal]". In Balogh, Elemér; Homoki-Nagy, Mária (eds.). Ünnepi kötet dr. Blazovich László egyetemi tanár 70. születésnapjára (in Hungarian). University of Szeged. pp. 591–600. ISSN 0324-6523.
- Zsoldos, Attila (2009). "A Nagymartoniak: egy aragóniai család Magyarországon [The Nagymartonis: an Aragonese Family in Hungary]". In Tóth, Csaba; Sarobe, Ramon (eds.). Királylányok messzi földről. Magyarország és Katalónia a középkorban (in Hungarian). Hungarian National Museum. pp. 177–189. ISBN 978-963-706-164-6.
- Zsoldos, Attila (2011). Magyarország világi archontológiája, 1000–1301 [Secular Archontology of Hungary, 1000–1301] (in Hungarian). História, MTA Történettudományi Intézete. ISBN 978-963-9627-38-3.

Paul I House of Nagymartoni Born: ? Died: June 1351
Political offices
Preceded by Alexander Köcski	Judge royal 1328–1349	Succeeded by Thomas Szécsényi
