= József Molnár (painter) =

Hungarian painter

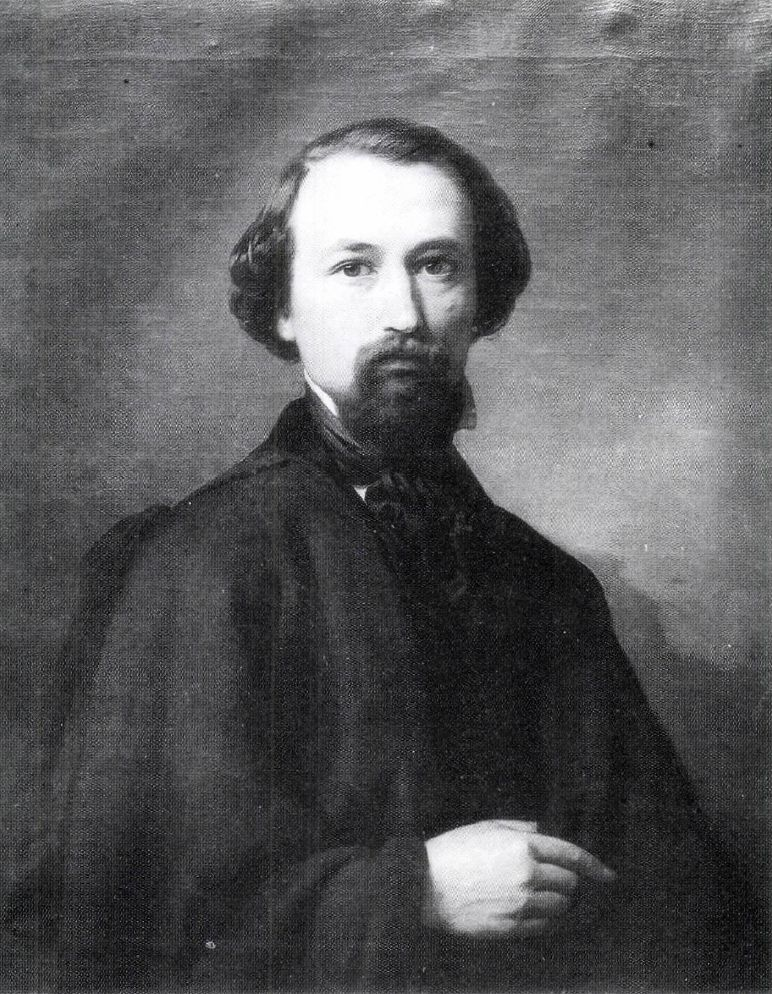
Molnár in c. 1849, self-portrait

József Molnár (21 March 1821 – 6 March 1899) was a Hungarian painter.

Molnár was born in Zsámbék and studied in Venice, Rome and Munich. After his studies, he settled down in Stuttgart, where he earned money by painting portraits. He returned to Hungary in 1853 and started painting landscapes and historic paintings in Pest.

Molnár died in Budapest.

== Gallery ==
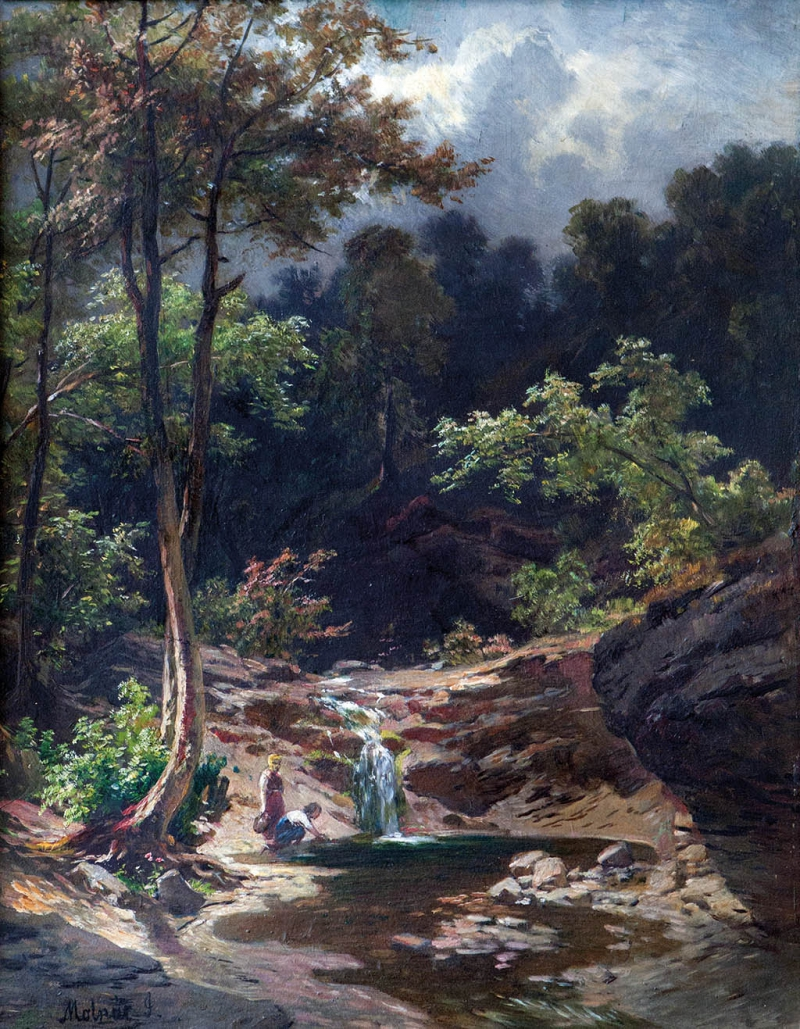
Forest Creek

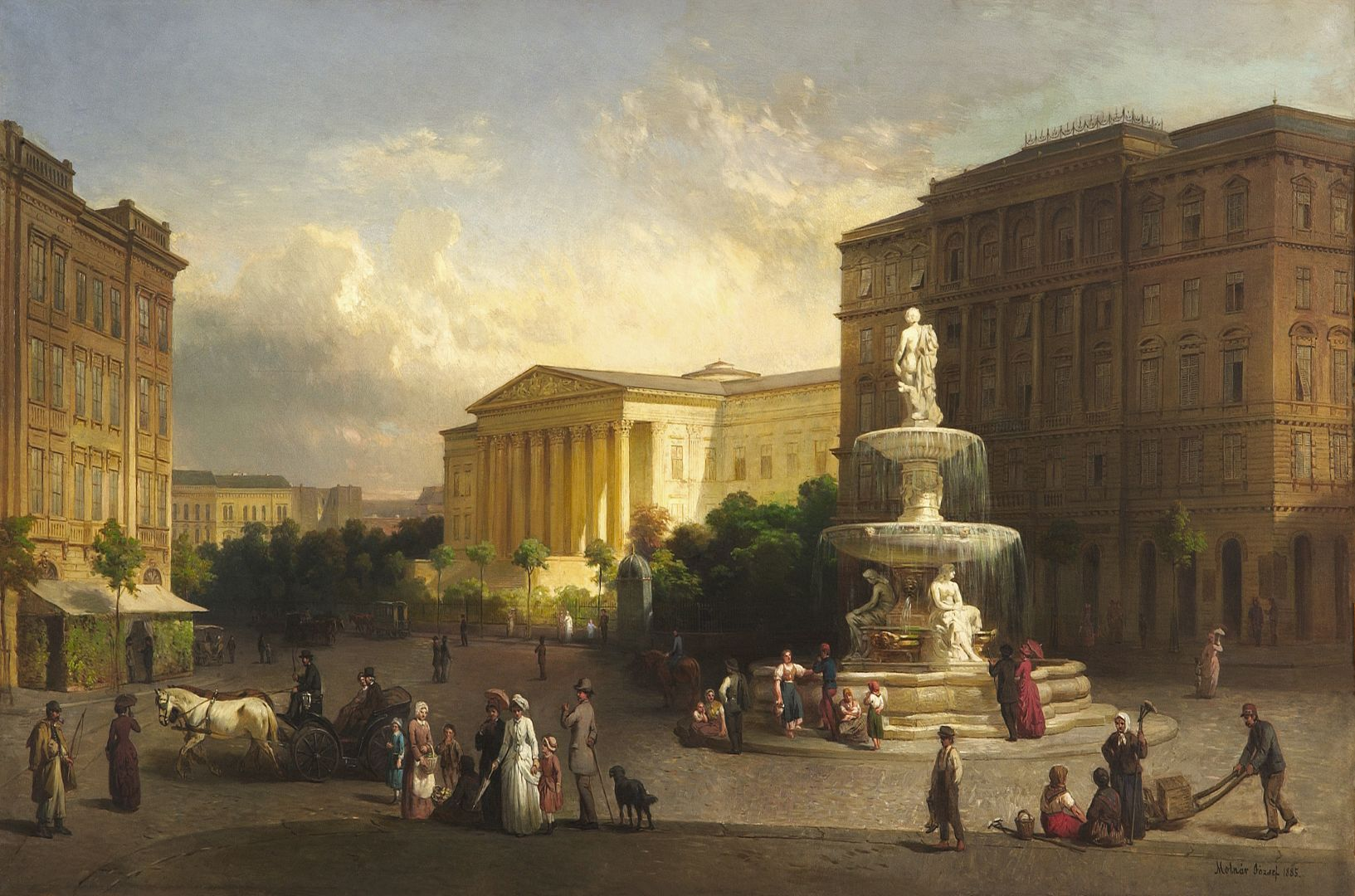
Kálvin tér, 1885

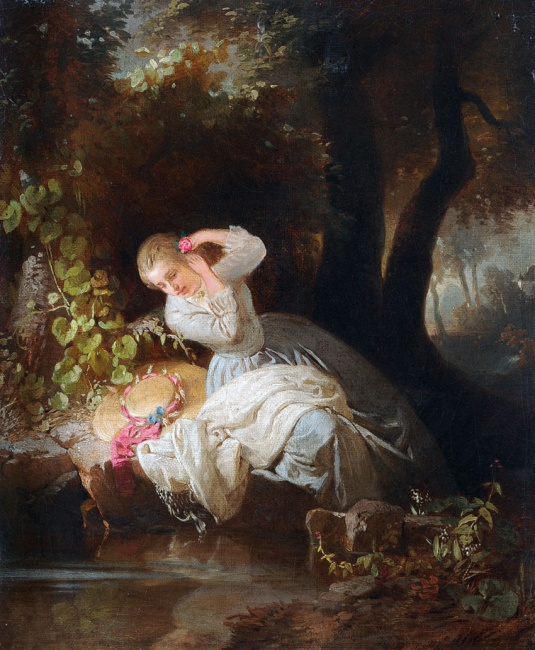
On the Riverside

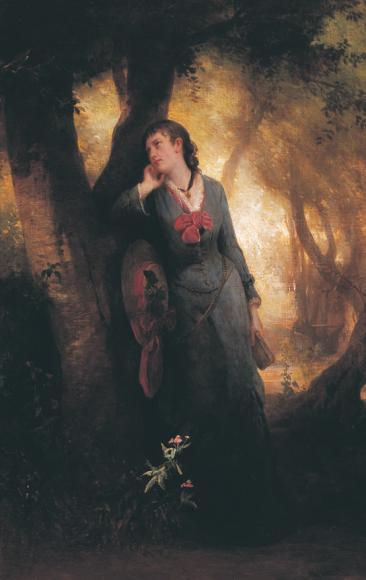
Birdsong (The Nightingale), 1878

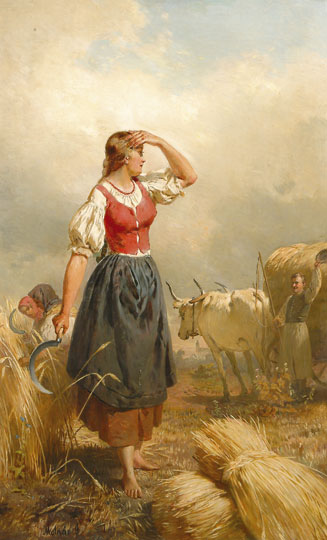
Binder

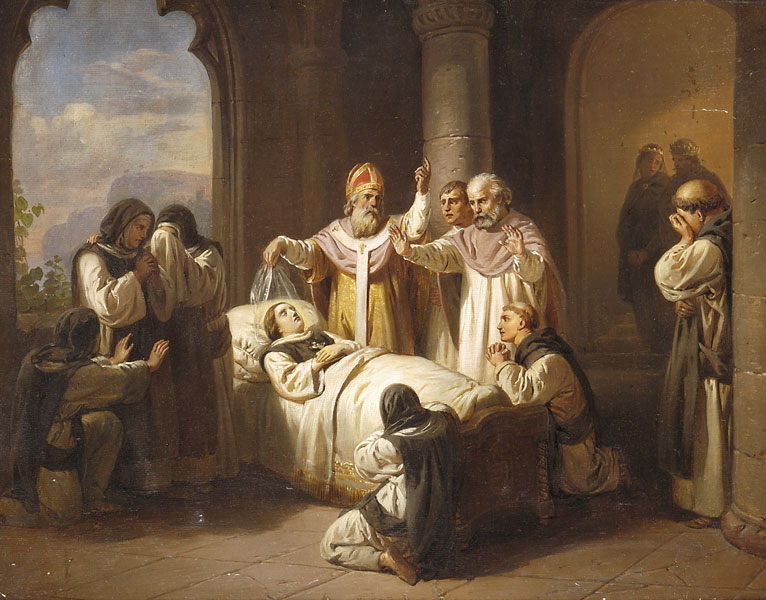
Death of Saint Margaret of Hungary, 1857

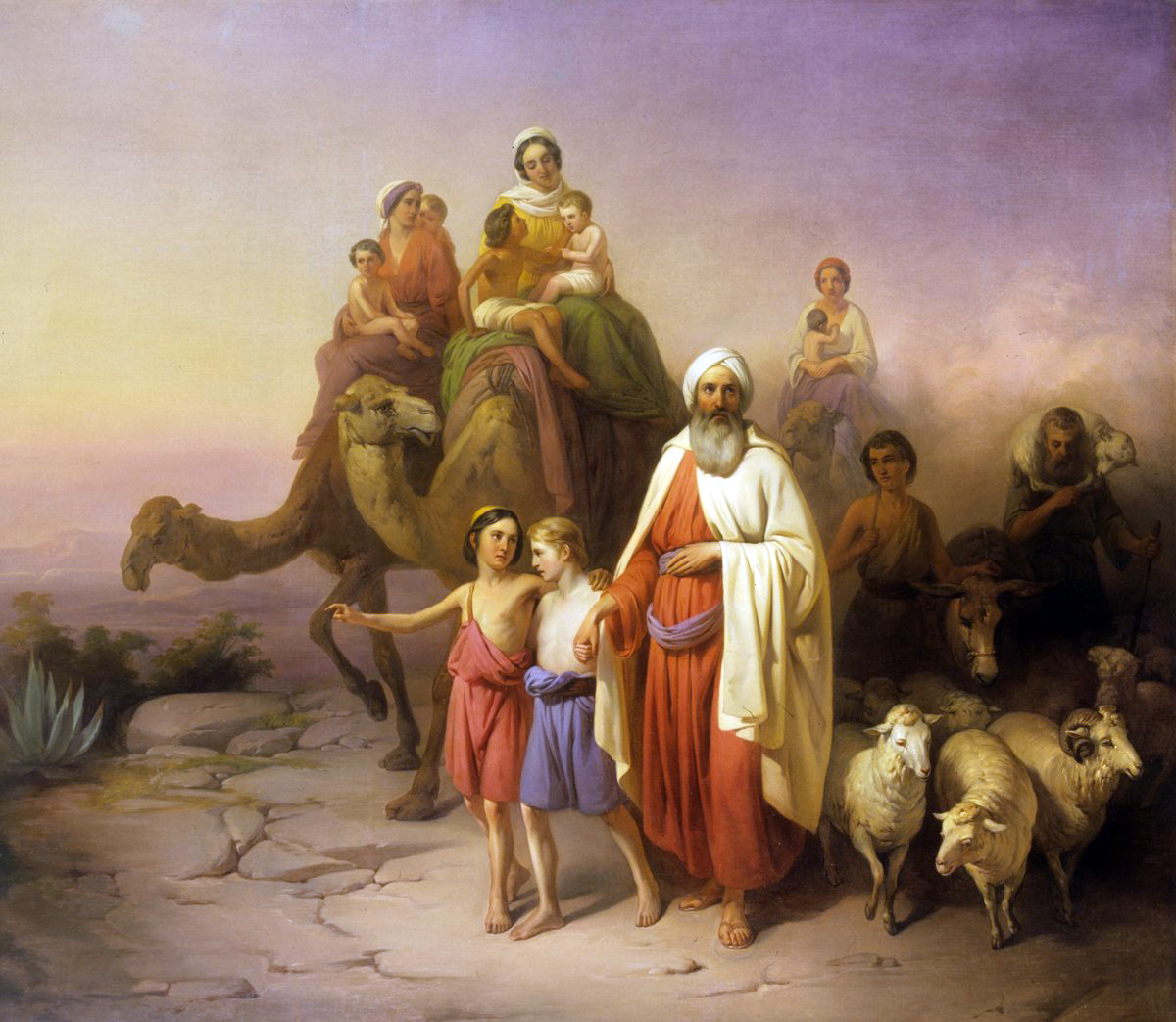
The Departure of Abraham, 1850
