= Sopronkövesd =

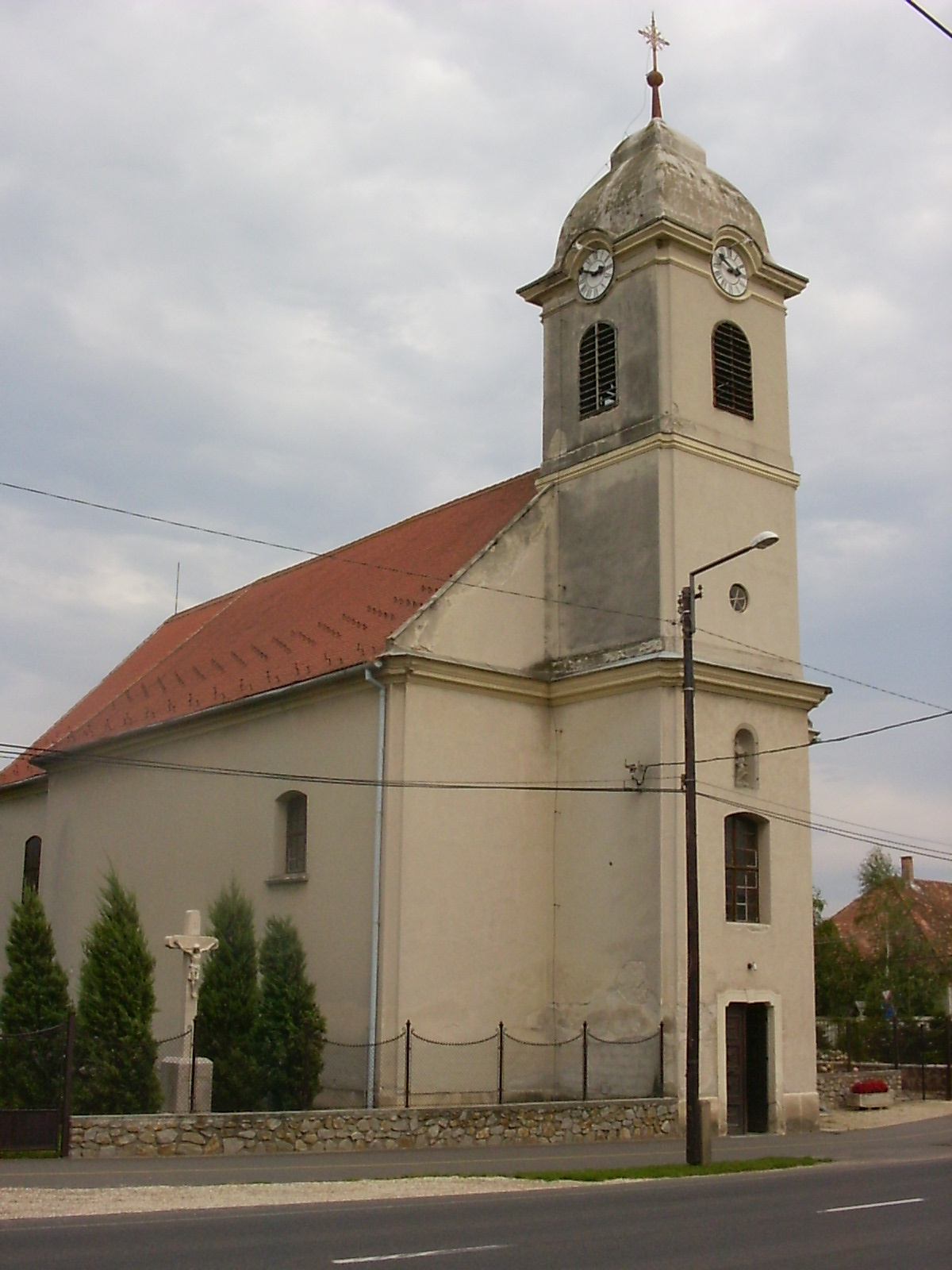
- Church of the Nativity of the Virgin Mary

- Flag Coat of arms

- Location of Sopronkövesd
- Coordinates: 47.5500°N 16.7500°E
- Country: Hungary
- County: Győr-Moson-Sopron

Government
  - Mayor: Fülöp Zoltán (Ind.)

Area
  - Total: 26.81 km^{2} (10.35 sq mi)

Population (2022)
  - Total: 1,413
  - Density: 52.70/km^{2} (136.5/sq mi)
- Time zone: UTC+1 (CET)
  - Summer (DST): UTC+2 (CEST)
- Postal code: 9483
- Area code: 99
- Website: www.sopronkovesd.hu

Sopronkövesd (German: Gissing) is a village in Győr-Moson-Sopron County, Hungary.
