= Bodíky =

Bodíky Nagybodak
- Municipality
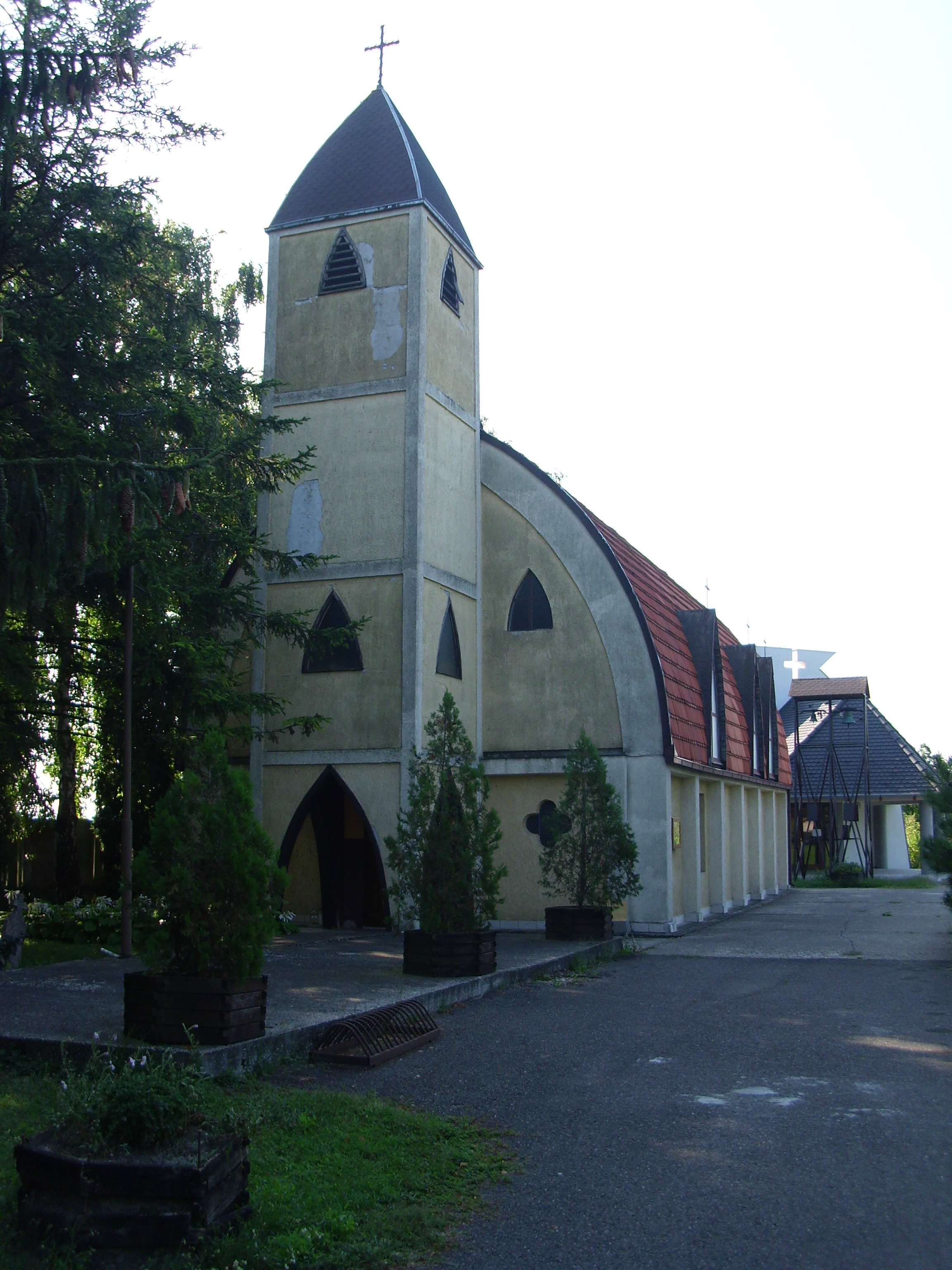

- Flag

- Location of Bodíky in the Trnava Region Location of Bodíky in Slovakia
- Coordinates: 47.92°N 17.46°E
- Country: Slovakia
- Region: Trnava Region
- District: Dunajská Streda District
- First mentioned: 1272

Government
  - Mayor: Tamas Vilagi (Party of the Hungarian Coalition)

Area
  - Total: 24.75 km^{2} (9.56 sq mi)
- Elevation: 119 m (390 ft)

Population (2025)
  - Total: 291

Ethnicity
  - Hungarians: 96.53%
  - Slovaks: 1.58%
- Time zone: UTC+1 (CET)
  - Summer (DST): UTC+2 (CEST)
- Postal code: 930 29
- Area code: +421 31
- Vehicle registration plate (until 2022): DS
- Website: www.bodiky.sk

Bodíky (Hungarian: Nagybodak, pronounced [ˈnɒɟbodɒk]) is a village and municipality in the Dunajská Streda District in the Trnava Region of south-west Slovakia.

It has a public water-supply system and sewage system connected to sewage disposal plant. There is a football playground and a public library in the village.

== Geography ==
The municipality lies at an altitude of 119 metres (390 ft) and covers an area of 24.75 km^{2} (9.56 sq mi) (2025).

== History ==
Until the end of World War I, it was part of Hungary. In the 15th century, the village belonged to the Pressburg Castle. After the 17th century the Amadé, Kánya, Cseszneky and Pálffy families were the most important land-owners in the village.

The village administratively fell within the Dunaszerdahely district of Pozsony County in the Kingdom of Hungary. After the Austro-Hungarian army disintegrated in November 1918, Czechoslovak troops occupied the area. Under the Treaty of Trianon of 1920, it became officially part of Czechoslovakia and fell within Bratislava County until 1927. In November 1938, the First Vienna Award granted the area to Hungary and it was held by Hungary until 1945. After Soviet occupation in 1945, Czechoslovak administration returned and the village became officially part of Czechoslovakia by the Paris Peace Treaties in 1947.

== Population ==
Population statistic (10 years)
Year	1995	2005	2015	2025
Count	357	283	271	291
Difference		−20.72%	−4.24%	+7.38%

Population statistic
Year	2024	2025
Count	296	291
Difference		−1.68%

It has a population of 291 people (31 December 2025).

=== Ethnicity ===
Census 2021 (1+ %)
Ethnicity	Number	Fraction
Hungarian	197	71.89%
Slovak	86	31.38%
Not found out	9	3.28%
Total	274	

In year 2021 was 274 people by ethnicity 197 as Hungarian, 86 as Slovak, 9 as Not found out, 1 as Austrian and 1 as English.

Note on population: The difference values of population numbers in the table "Population statistic" and in the sections "Ethnicity" & "Religion" is caused by the use of various statistical methods.

=== Religion ===
Census 2021 (1+ %)
Religion	Number	Fraction
Roman Catholic Church	203	74.09%
None	45	16.42%
Not found out	7	2.55%
Calvinist Church	5	1.82%
Christian Congregations in Slovakia	5	1.82%
Greek Catholic Church	3	1.09%
Evangelical Church	3	1.09%
Total	274	

In year 2021 was 274 people by religion 203 from Roman Catholic Church, 45 from None, 7 from Not found out, 5 from Calvinist Church, 5 from Christian Congregations in Slovakia, 3 from Greek Catholic Church, 3 from Evangelical Church, 1 from Jehovah's Witnesses, 1 from Other and 1 from Buddhism.

== Notable Locations ==
- Kráľovská lúka - Nature monument
- Zvonica - Religious Chapel
- Prícestný kríž - Memorial

== See also ==
- List of municipalities and towns in Slovakia

== Genealogical resources ==
The records for genealogical research are available at the state archive "Štátny Archív in Bratislava, Slovakia"

- Roman Catholic church records (births/marriages/deaths): 1676-1912 (parish B)
- Lutheran church records (births/marriages/deaths): 1823-1946 (parish B)
- Reformated church records (births/marriages/deaths): 1823-1946 (parish B)
