= Zaránd County =

County of the Kingdom of Hungary

Zaránd County as a part Principality of Transylvania

Zaránd County (Hungarian: Zaránd vármegye, Latin: Comitatus Zarandiensis) was an administrative unit of the Kingdom of Hungary and the Principality of Transylvania from the middle ages until 1876. Located mainly in the Fehér-Körös/Crișul Alb river valley, today its former territory lies mostly in Romania, with a small amount in south-eastern Hungary.

In the 16th century Zaránd was part of the Eastern Hungarian Kingdom and later the Partium territories of the Principality of Transylvania. It returned to Habsburg Hungary in 1699.

In 1744 most of the western territory of Zaránd County, including its capital Zaránd/Zărand, was transferred to Arad County; Körösbánya/Baia de Criș became the capital of the new rump county.

During a period of significant administrative reform in the Austrian Empire following the Revolutions of 1848 the traditional counties of Transylvania (including the Partium territories of Zaránd, Kraszna, Közép-Szolnok and Kővár) were abolished and reorganised into five Kreise (districts; literally "circles") in 1851; Zaránd's territory was incorporated into the Kreis of Karlsburg. In 1854 the Kreis system was revised significantly with the previously five Kreise becoming ten; Zaránd's territory became part of the new Kreis of Broos. The pre-1848 counties, including Zaránd, were restored in 1860.

Zaránd county was finally permanently dissolved as part of the 1876 administrative reform in the Lands of the Crown of Saint Stephen; most of its territory became part of Hunyad County as the Körösbánya and Brád districts, with a smaller western part being merged into Arad county as the district of Nagyhalmágy.

== List of ispáns ==
=== Middle Ages ===
Term	Incumbent	Monarch	Notes	Source
c. 1306	James Borsa		also Palatine of Hungary	
1324–1330	Desiderius Hédervári	Charles I	he was also castellan of Világos Castle, and ispán of Sopron and Győr Counties	
1330–1331	Henry Hédervári	Charles I	son of Desiderius; he was also castellan of Világos Castle	

== Sources ==
- Bóna, István (1994). "The Hungarian–Slav Period (895–1172)". In Köpeczi, Béla; Barta, Gábor; Bóna, István; Makkai, László; Szász, Zoltán; Borus, Judit (eds.). History of Transylvania. Akadémiai Kiadó. pp. 109–177. ISBN 963-05-6703-2.
- Engel, Pál (1996). Magyarország világi archontológiája, 1301–1457, I. [Secular Archontology of Hungary, 1301–1457, Volume I] (in Hungarian). História, MTA Történettudományi Intézete. ISBN 963-8312-44-0.
- Kristó, Gyula (1988). A vármegyék kialakulása Magyarországon [The Development of the Counties in Hungary] (in Hungarian). Magvető Kiadó. ISBN 963-14-1189-3.
