= Kobersdorf =

- Municipality
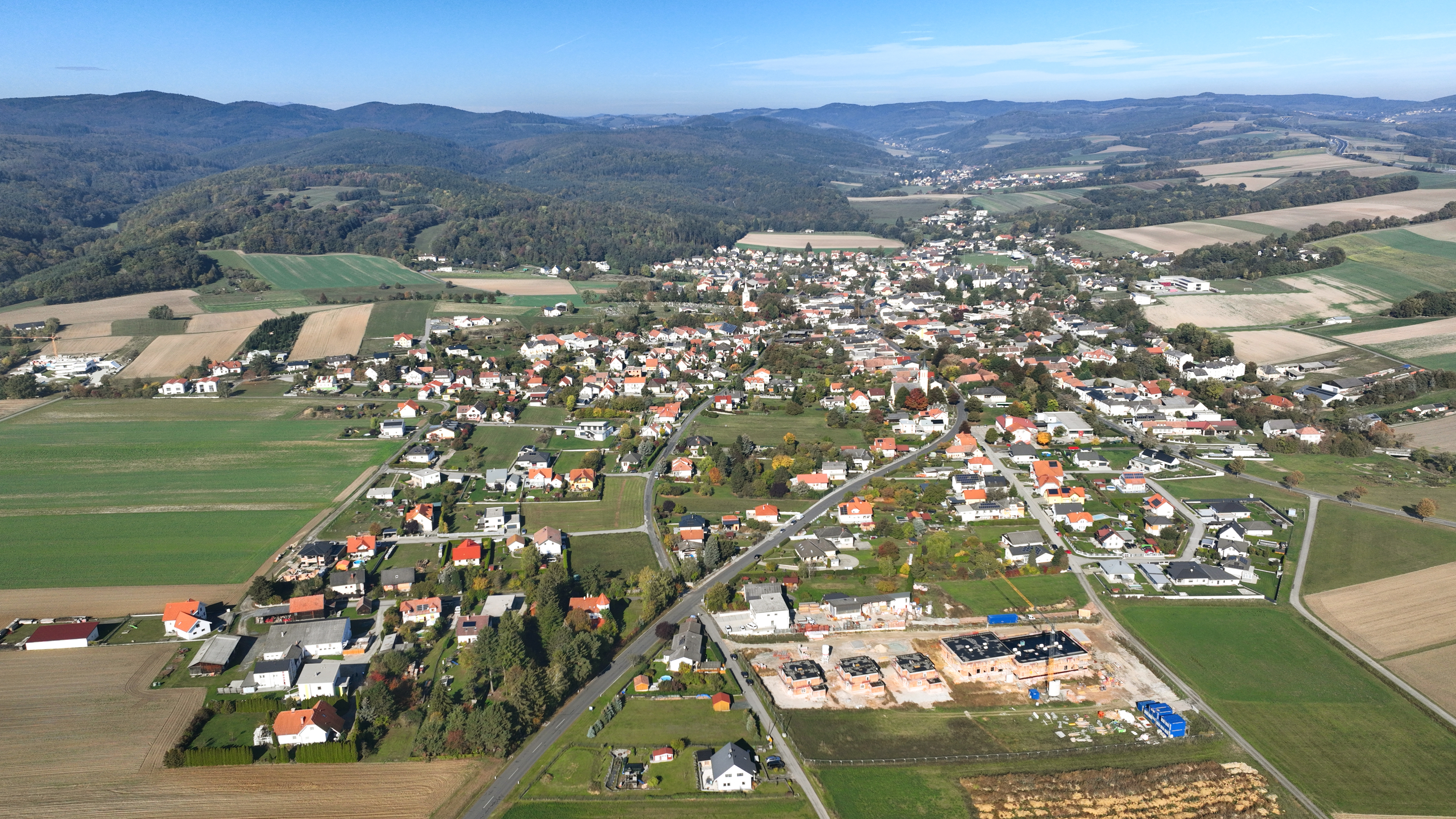
- Southeast view of Kobersdorf

- Coat of arms

- Location within Burgenland Location within Austria
- Coordinates: 47°35′43″N 16°23′32″E
- Country: Austria
- State: Burgenland
- District: Oberpullendorf

Government
  - Mayor: Klaus Schütz (SPÖ)

Area
  - Total: 27.29 km^{2} (10.54 sq mi)
- Elevation: 320 m (1,050 ft)

Population (2018-01-01)
  - Total: 1,883
  - Density: 69.00/km^{2} (178.7/sq mi)
- Time zone: UTC+1 (CET)
  - Summer (DST): UTC+2 (CEST)
- Postal code: 7332
- Area code: 02618
- Vehicle registration: OP

Kobersdorf (Hungarian: Kabold, Croatian: Kobrštof) is an Austrian market town in Oberpullendorf, Burgenland.

== Geography ==
Kobersdorf is located in Middle Burgenland and is divided into the districts of Kobersdorf, Lindgraben, and Oberpetersdorf. The municipality lies at the foot of the Pauliberg, the last extinct volcano in Austria in the middle of the Naturpark Landseer Berge.

== History ==
Like the rest of Burgenland, Kobersdorf belonged to the Kingdom of Hungary until 1920–21. After the end of the First World War, the western border area of Hungary was awarded to Austria by the Treaties of St. Germain and Trianon. Since 1921, the town has belonged to the newly founded State of Burgenland.

Kobersdorf was one of the Jewish Siebengemeinden of Burgenland. Its synagogue, built in 1860, is the only one in the seven communities that still stands. Since its restoration, it has been used for memorial services.

Kobersdorf has been a market town since 1973 (through a recently reissued VO 5).

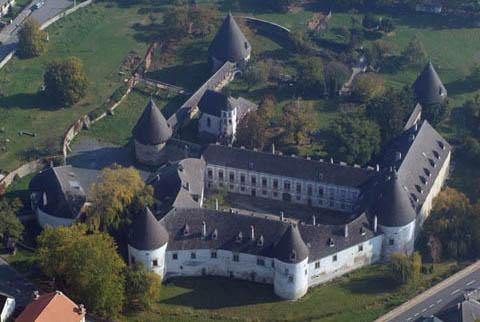
Aerial view of the castle

== Politics ==
The mandate assignments in the Municipal Council (21 seats) are SPÖ 11, ÖVP 7, FPÖ 0, Grüne 0, and other lists 3.

== Culture and landmarks ==
Kobersdorf Palace (German: Schloss Kobersdorf Schloss Kobersdorf) is famous for the plays that take place there every July.

== Business and Infrastructure ==
The most important employers are:

- the mineral water producer Waldquelle
- the Basalt Quarry on the Pauliberg
- the Hobby Versand Company
- the Reitter Bau Company

== Notable residents ==
- Yosef Chaim Zonnenfeld

== Sister cities ==
- Waldbrun in Baden-Württemberg, Germany
