= Großhöflein =

- Municipality
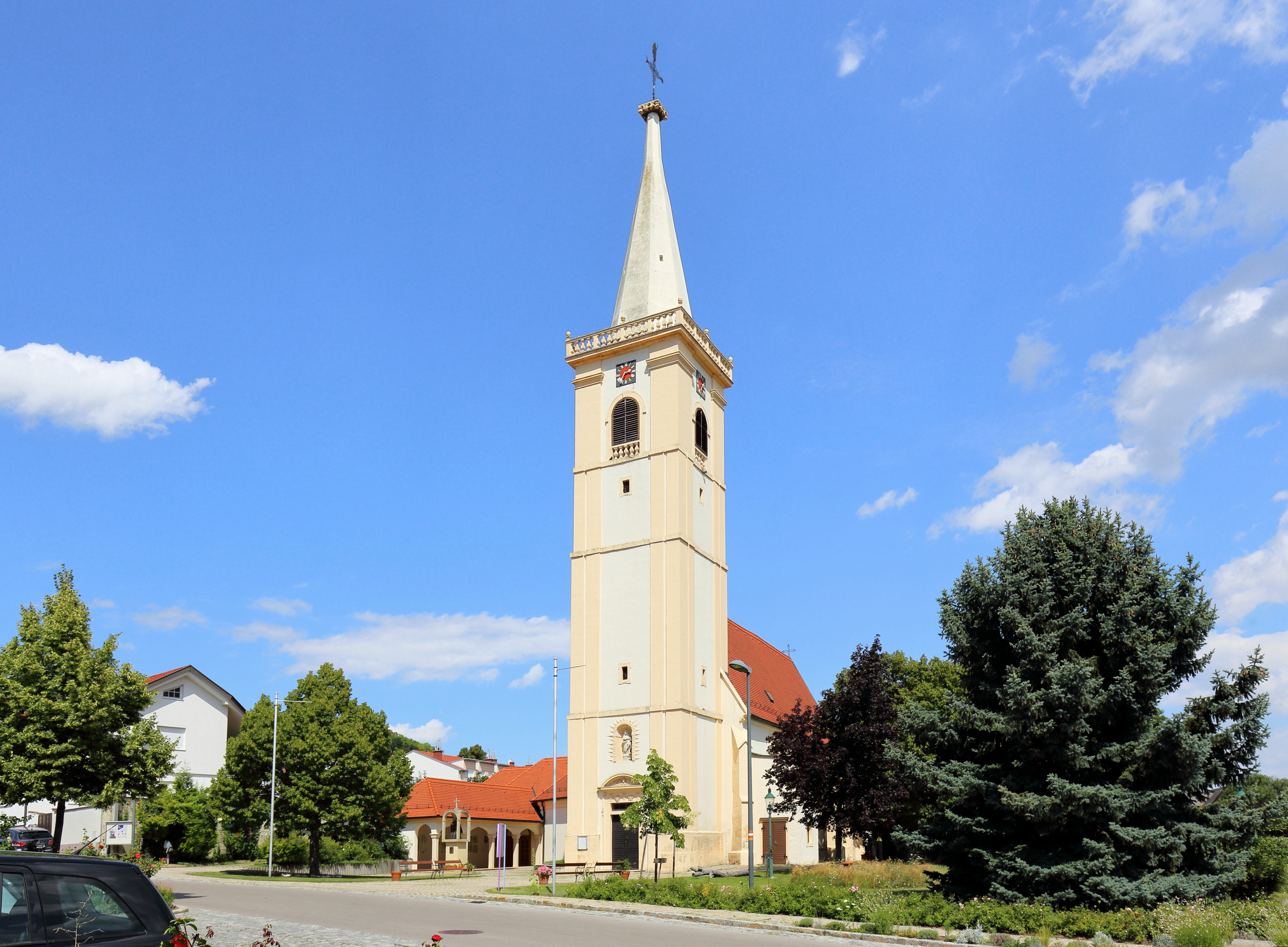
- Church of Saint John the Baptist

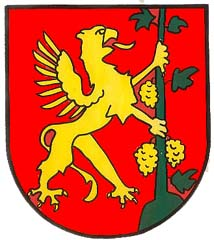
- Coat of arms

- Location within Austria
- Coordinates: 47°50′N 16°29′E
- Country: Austria
- State: Burgenland
- District: Eisenstadt-Umgebung

Government
  - Mayor: Heinz Heidenreich (SPÖ)

Area
  - Total: 14.25 km^{2} (5.50 sq mi)
- Elevation: 194 m (636 ft)

Population (2022-01-01)
  - Total: 2,122
  - Density: 148.9/km^{2} (385.7/sq mi)
- Time zone: UTC+1 (CET)
  - Summer (DST): UTC+2 (CEST)
- Postal code: 7051
- Area code: 02682
- Website: www.grosshoeflein.at

Großhöflein (Hungarian: Nagy-Höflány, Nagyhöflány, Croatian: Velika Holovajna) is a market town in eastern Austria, in the state of Burgenland. It is located near the state capital Eisenstadt.

== History ==
BCE, the area was part of the Celtic kingdom of Noricum. Under the Roman Empire, today's Großhöflein was in the province of Pannonia.

Like all of Burgenland, Großhöflein was in Hungary until 1920/21.

== Population ==
Historical population
Year	Pop.	±%
1869	1,338	—
1880	1,455	+8.7%
1890	1,527	+4.9%
1900	1,456	−4.6%
1910	1,331	−8.6%
1923	1,339	+0.6%
1934	1,451	+8.4%
1939	1,445	−0.4%
1951	1,406	−2.7%
1961	1,472	+4.7%
1971	1,503	+2.1%
1981	1,563	+4.0%
1991	1,678	+7.4%
2001	1,859	+10.8%
2011	1,910	+2.7%
2021	2,122	+11.1%
2024	2,091	−1.5%

== People ==
- Nikolaus Esterházy de Galántha, lived and died here in 1645.

== Nearby municipalities ==
- Kleinhöflein im Burgenland (now a part of Eisenstadt)
- Müllendorf
- Wulkaprodersdorf
- Steinbrunn

== See also ==
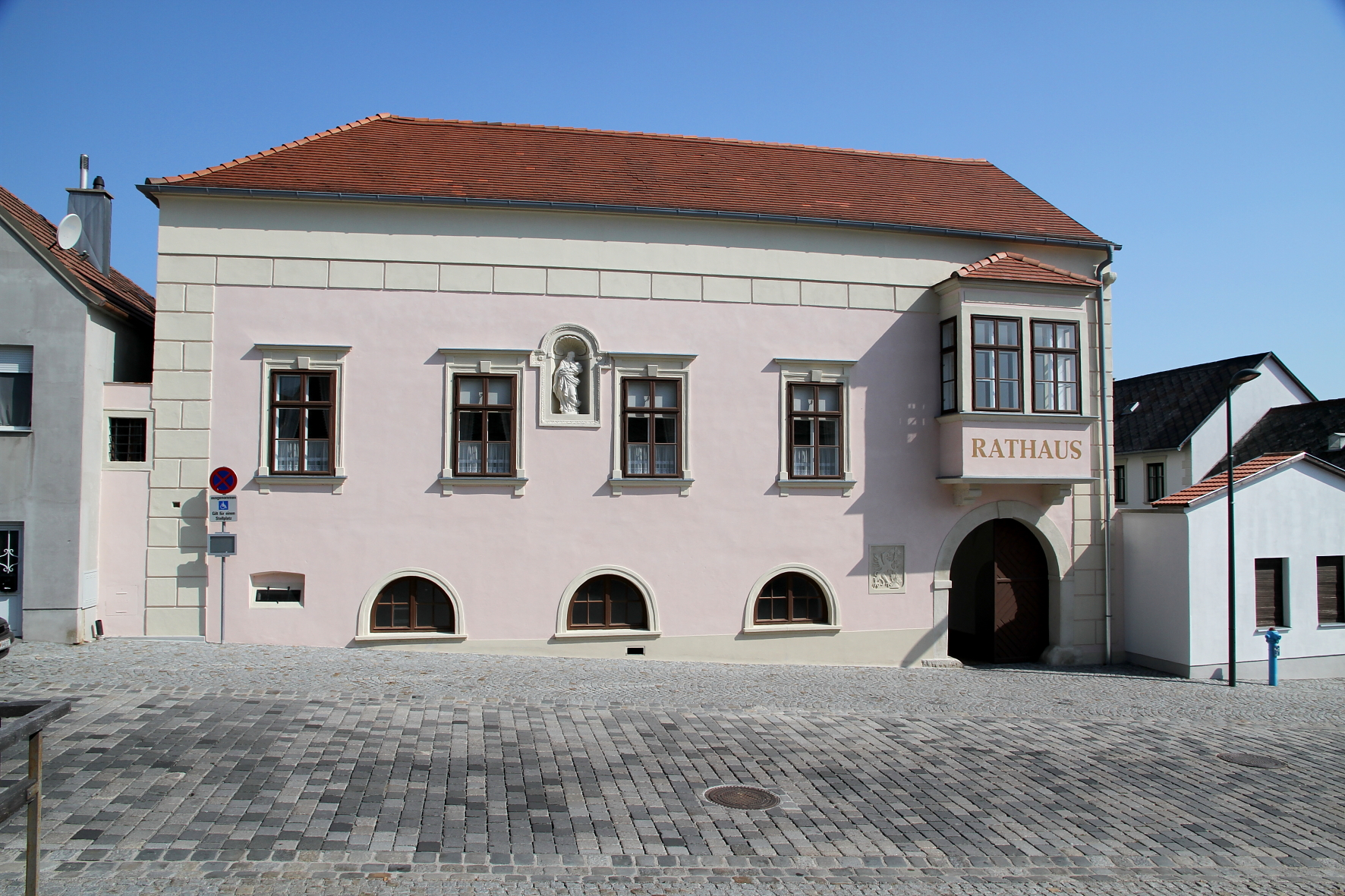
Rathaus Großhöflein

- Weingut Kollwentz (de), a winery
