= Neufeld an der Leitha =

- Municipality
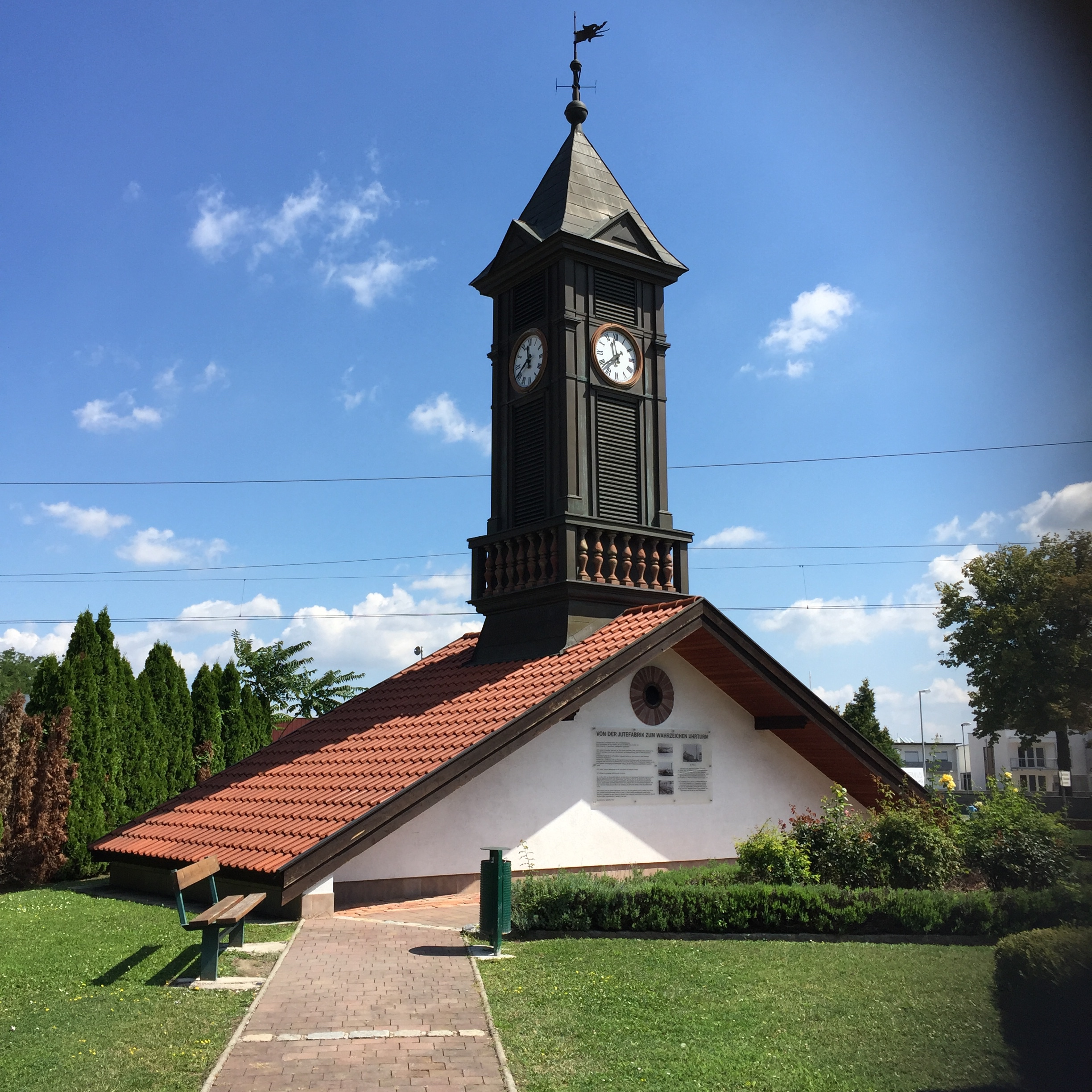
- Clock tower

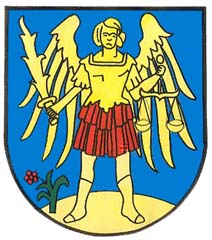
- Coat of arms

- Location within Burgenland Location within Austria
- Coordinates: 47°52′N 16°23′E
- Country: Austria
- State: Burgenland
- District: Eisenstadt-Umgebung

Government
  - Mayor: Michael Lampel (SPÖ)

Area
  - Total: 4.29 km^{2} (1.66 sq mi)
- Elevation: 230 m (750 ft)

Population (2018-01-01)
  - Total: 3,418
  - Density: 797/km^{2} (2,060/sq mi)
- Time zone: UTC+1 (CET)
  - Summer (DST): UTC+2 (CEST)
- Postal code: 2491
- Area code: 02624
- Website: www.neufeld-leitha.at

Neufeld an der Leitha (Croatian: Novo Selo, Hungarian: Lajtaújfalu, Lajta-Újfalu, 'new village on the Leitha') is a town in the district of Eisenstadt-Umgebung in the Austrian state of Burgenland. It lies on the river Leitha, which forms the border with Lower Austria.

== Population ==
Historical population
Year	Pop.	±%
1869	777	—
1880	838	+7.9%
1890	1,781	+112.5%
1900	2,904	+63.1%
1910	2,867	−1.3%
1923	3,079	+7.4%
1934	2,640	−14.3%
1939	2,511	−4.9%
1951	2,383	−5.1%
1961	2,430	+2.0%
1971	2,304	−5.2%
1981	2,331	+1.2%
1991	2,642	+13.3%
2001	2,948	+11.6%
2011	3,112	+5.6%
2021	3,587	+15.3%

== Notable residents ==
- Hans Bögl (1899–1974), Governor of Burgenland 1964–1966, National Council 1959–1962
- Franz Erntl (1902–1990), painter
- Ludwig Leser (1890–1946), Governor of Burgenland 1945–1946
- Jürgen Mansberger (born 1988), footballer
- Fred Sinowatz (1929–2008), Federal Chancellor 1983–1986

== Literature ==
- Albert G. Absenger: 350 Jahre Neufeld. Eine chronikartige Geschichtsdarstellung. Stadtgemeinde Neufeld an der Leitha, Neufeld an der Leitha 2002.
- Albert Gernot Absenger: Chronik Neufeld III, Verdichtung der gesamten Ortshistorie als Folge- und Erweiterungsband von Lang- und Kurzfassung der 2002 erschienen chronikartigen Darstellung, Stadtgemeinde Neufeld an der Leitha, Neufeld an der Leitha 2007.
- Reinhold Arthofer: Festschrift 100 Jahre Evangelische Kirche A.B. Neufeld an der Leitha. 1904 - 2004. Selbstverlag der Evangelischen Pfarrgemeinde Eisenstadt, Eisenstadt 2004, ISBN 3-85374-368-4.
- Peter Krajasich: Die jüdische Bevölkerung von Eisenstadt und Neufeld im Jahre 1735. In: Hanns Schmid (Hrsg.): Urgeschichte - Römerzeit - Mittelalter. Band 2: Festschrift Alois-J. Ohrenberger. Amt der Burgenländischen Landesregierung, Abteilung 7, Landesmuseum, Eisenstadt 1985, ISBN 3-85405-095-X, (Wissenschaftliche Arbeiten aus dem Burgenland 71), S. 241–248.
- Harald Prickler: Zur Frühgeschichte der Neufelder Industrie. Amt der Burgenländ. Landesregierung, Abt. 7 - Kultur, Wiss. und Archiv, Hauptreferat Landesarchiv und Landesbibliothek, Eisenstadt 2008, ISBN 978-3-901517-59-4, (Burgenländische Forschungen 97).
