= Alvania perregularis =

Scientific classification
- Kingdom: Animalia
- Phylum: Mollusca
- Class: Gastropoda
- Subclass: Caenogastropoda
- Order: Littorinimorpha
- Superfamily: Rissooidea
- Family: Rissoidae
- Genus: Alvania
- Species: †A. perregularis

Binomial name
- †Alvania perregularis Sacco, 1895

Synonyms
- † Alvania (Acinus) mariae var. perregularis Sacco, 1895 superseded rank; † Alvania (Arsenia) perregularis Sacco, 1895 superseded rank

Species of gastropod

Alvania perregularis is an extinct species of minute sea snail, a marine gastropod mollusc or micromollusk in the family Rissoidae.

Variety

- † Alvania perregularis var. varicosa Friedberg, 1923 (taxon inquirendum)

== Distribution ==
Fossils of this species were found in Tortonian strata (Miocene) near Steinbrunn, Austria.
