= Leitha =

River in Austria and Hungary

Leitha Lajta
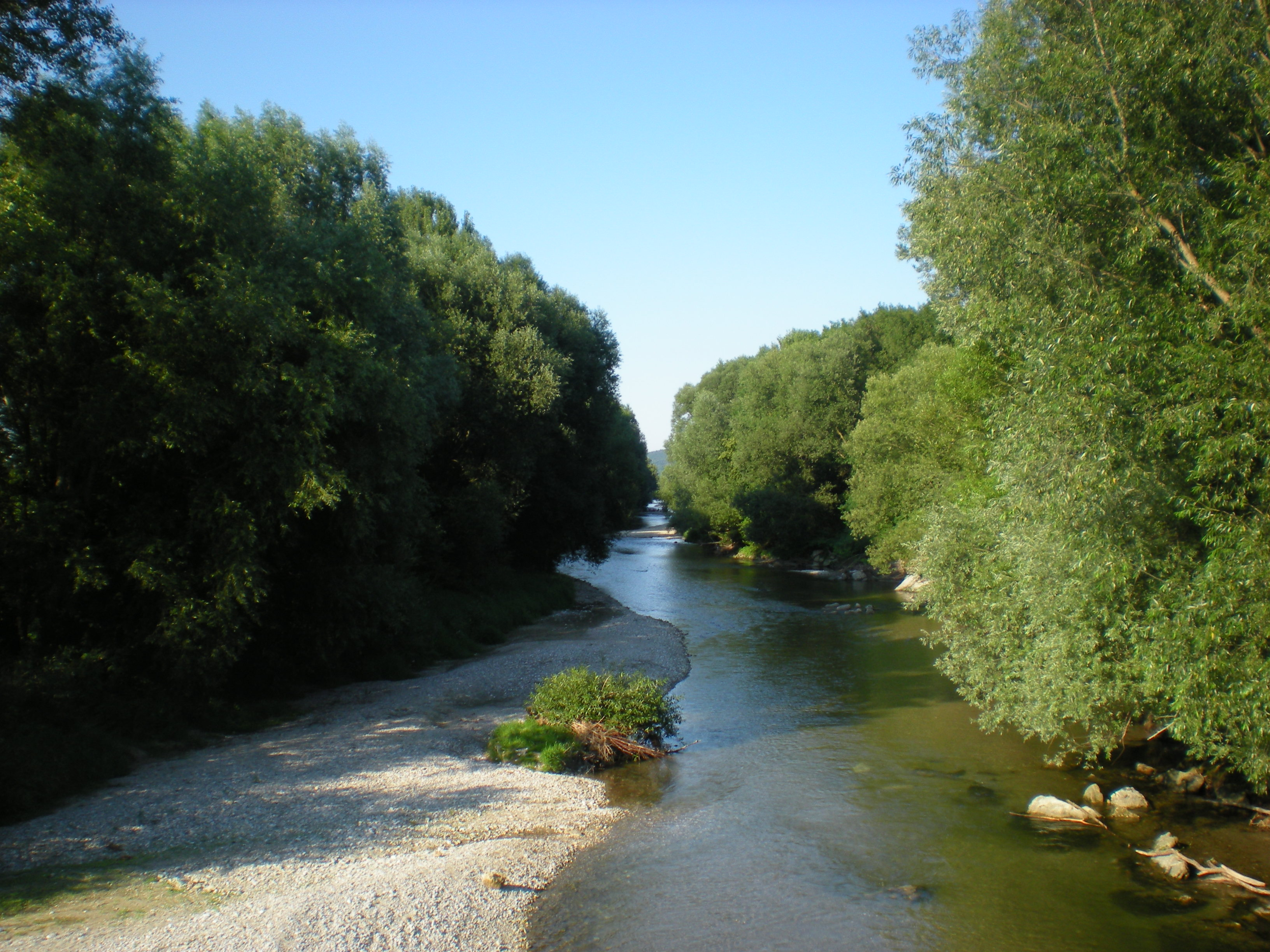
- The Leitha near Kleinwolkersdorf

- Location within Hungary

Location
- Countries: Austria and Hungary

Physical characteristics
- Source
  - location: Lanzenkirchen, southern Vienna Basin
  - coordinates: 47°44′11″N 16°13′49″E
- Mouth
  - location: Danube near Mosonmagyaróvár
  - coordinates: 47°52′8″N 17°17′17″E
- Length: 120.8 km (75.1 mi)
- Basin size: 2,138 km^{2} (825 sq mi)

Basin features
- Progression: Danube→ Black Sea

The Leitha (German: [ˈlaɪtaː]; Hungarian: Lajta, formerly Sár(-víz); Slovene: Litva; Czech and Slovak: Litava) is a river in Austria and Hungary, a right tributary of the Danube. It is 120.8 km (75.1 mi) long (168.5 km (104.7 mi) including its source river Schwarza). Its basin area is 2,138 km^{2} (825 sq mi).

== Etymology ==
The Lithaha River in the Carolingian Avar March was first mentioned in an 833 deed issued by Louis the German, son of the Carolingian emperor Louis the Pious and ruler over the stem duchy of Bavaria. The Old High German name lît probably referred to a Pannonian (Illyrian) denotation for "mud", as maintained in the former Hungarian name Sár (compare mocsár, 'swamp').

== Course ==
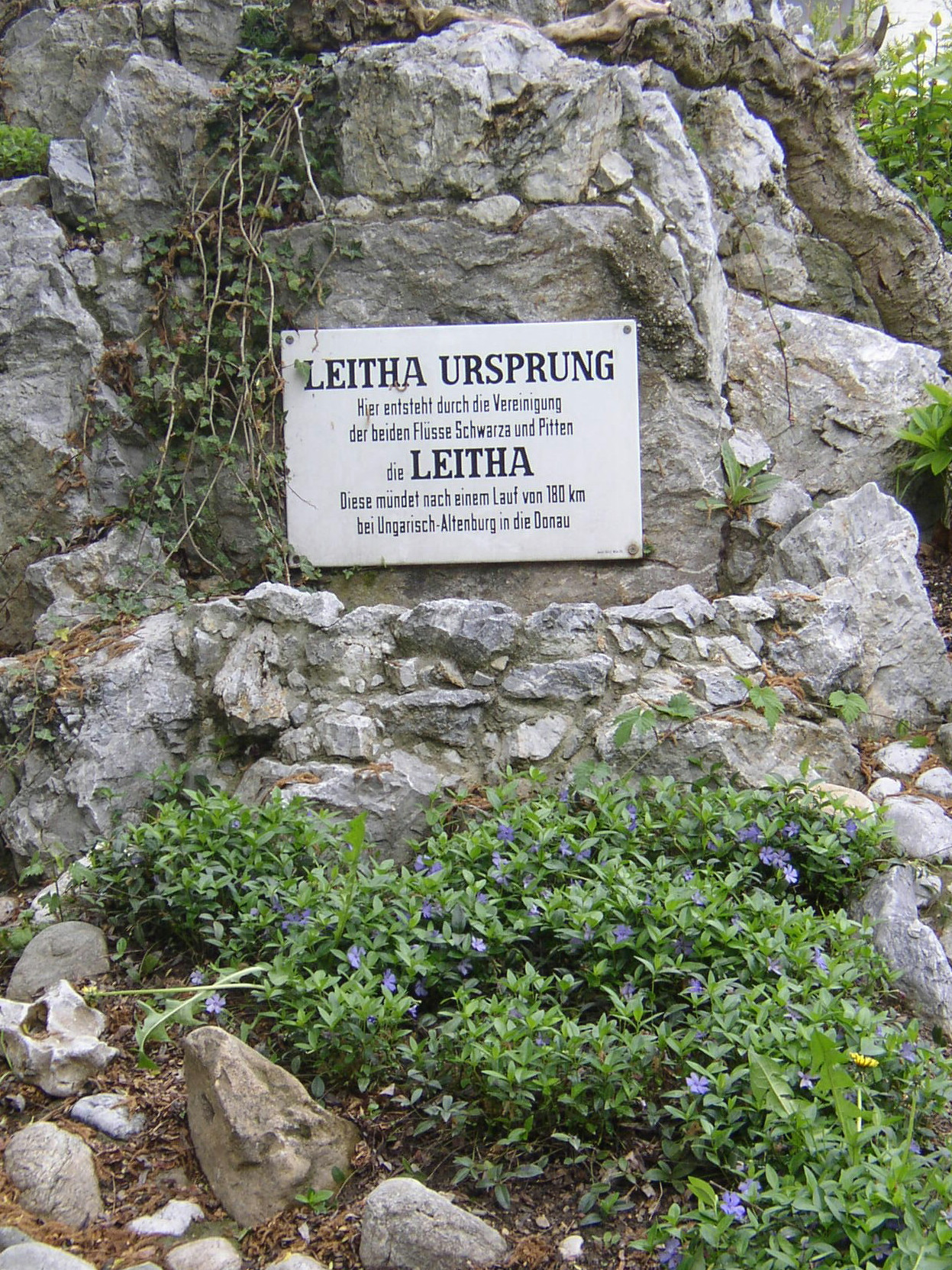
Plaque at Leitha origin

The Leitha rises in Lower Austria at the confluence of its two headstreams, the Schwarza, discharging the Schneeberg, Rax and Schneealpe ranges of the Northern Limestone Alps, and the Pitten. Between Ebenfurth and Leithaprodersdorf, and between Bruck an der Leitha and Gattendorf, the Leitha forms part of the border between the Austrian states of Lower Austria and Burgenland. East of Nickelsdorf, the river passes into Hungary, where it flows into the Moson arm of the Danube west of Szigetköz Island near Mosonmagyaróvár. Important towns on its course are Wiener Neustadt, Bruck and Mosonmagyaróvár.

Large amounts of the Schwarza headstream waters are diverted to supply the Wiener Neustadt Canal and the drinking water supply of Vienna. Furthermore, several canals diverge from the Leitha, feeding spinning companies in the past, today small hydroelectric power plants.

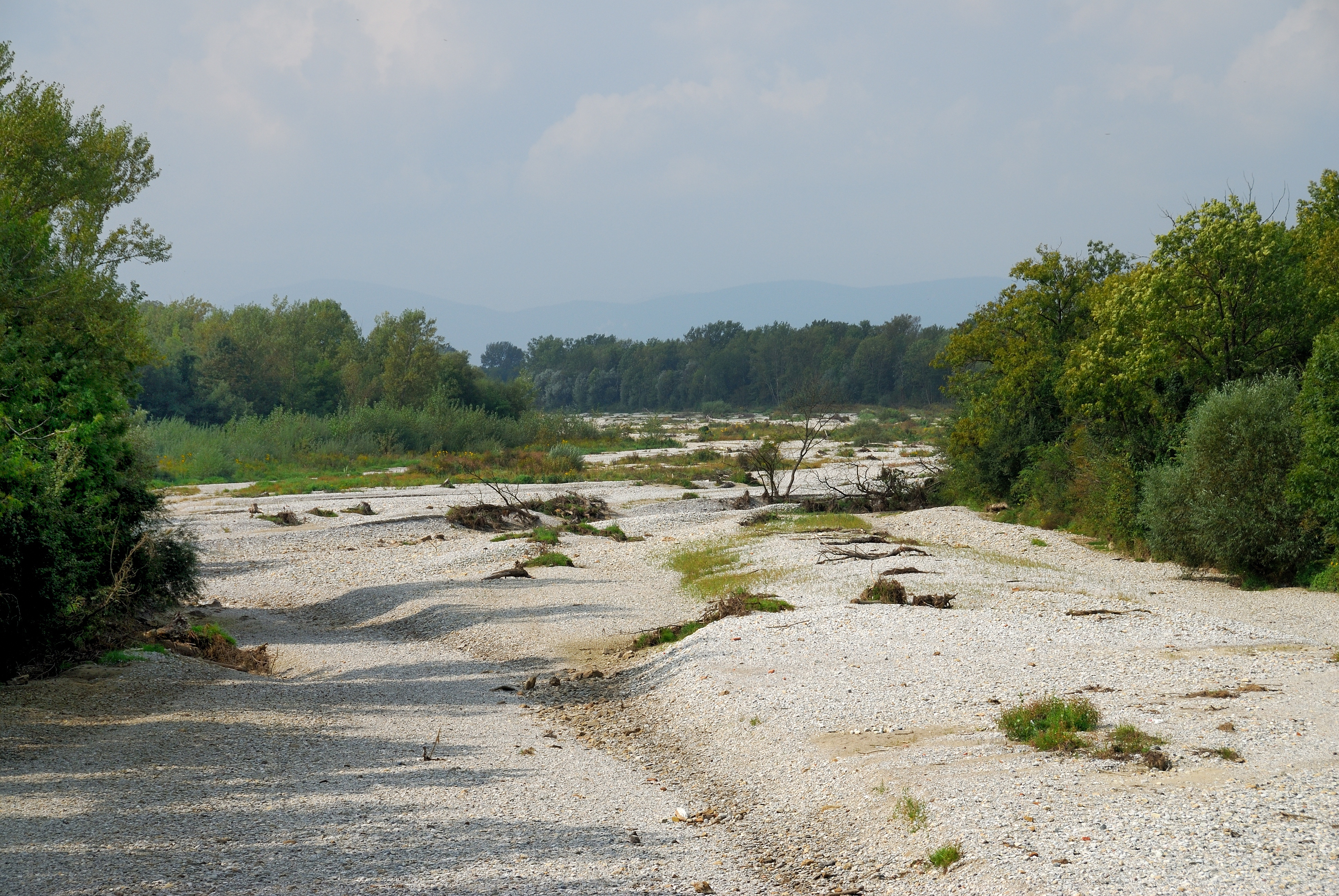
Dried-up streambed of Leitha near Bad Erlach

Between Seibersdorf and Hof am Leithaberge, most of the water in the Leitha is removed for this purpose. From there on, the Leitha usually runs dry, unless its flow further upstream is abnormally high. Downriver from Katzelsdorf the river bed is almost completely dry as well.

== Legends ==
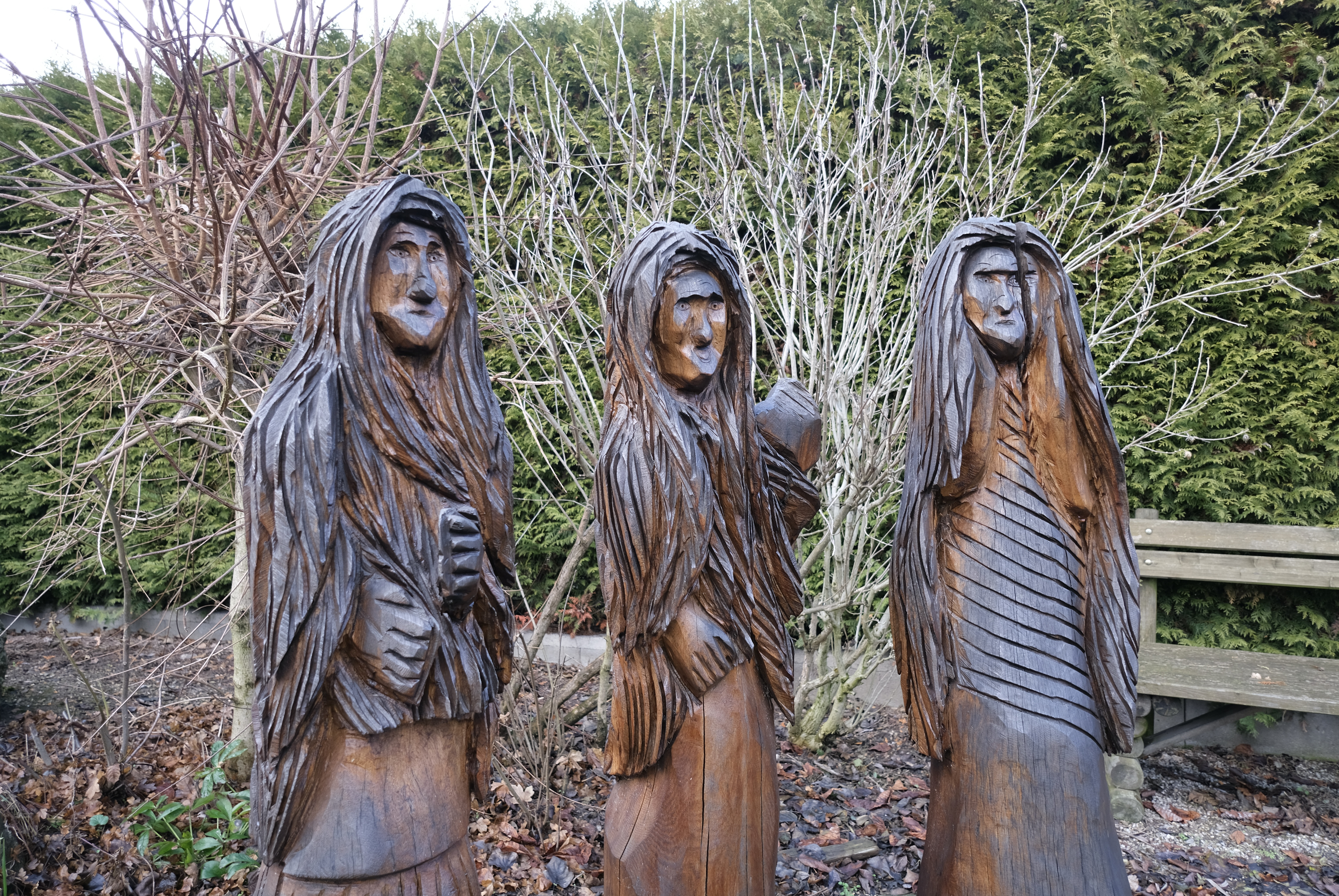
Leitha River Hexen statues in Lanzenkirchen

At the Leitha Ursprung (or Source) in the small town of Lanzenkirchen, there is a hiking trail, a stone with a plaque to mark the origin point and three wooden figures that represent the legendary Leitha Hexen (witches).

According to the sign next to the three wooden women, "Once upon a time, real witches lived in the waters of the Leitha. They were small, like children, skinny and hunchbacked, with tangled hair that reached down to their knees and webbed fingers and toes."

"The witches mostly splashed around under the bridges, but anyone who teased them or watched them met a bad end."

"One evening a man was overcome by the desire to tempt the Leitha witches. When he heard them in the water, he put both hands around his mouth and shouted: 'Hoo hoo!' ”

"Then he hurried away laughing. But he didn't get far, because suddenly countless bony hands wrapped around him and pulled him to the ground! No amount of struggling and struggling helped; he couldn't even call for help. He only felt a wet cloth being pressed over his mouth, then his senses faded."

"When he came to again, he was lying on the banks of the Leitha, on the border with Katzelsdorf. But the Leitha witches were nowhere to be seen or heard."

== Historic border ==
After the Hungarian conquest of the Carpathian Basin in the late 9th century, the Magyar horsemen dared further invasions into the adjacent East Frankish lands, until they were finally defeated by King Otto I in the 955 Battle of Lechfeld. Thereafter the forces of the Bavarian duke Henry the Wrangler gradually re-conquered the lands beyond the Vienna Woods up to the Leitha River, where about 976 the March of Austria (Ostarrîchi) was established under the Babenberg margrave Leopold I.

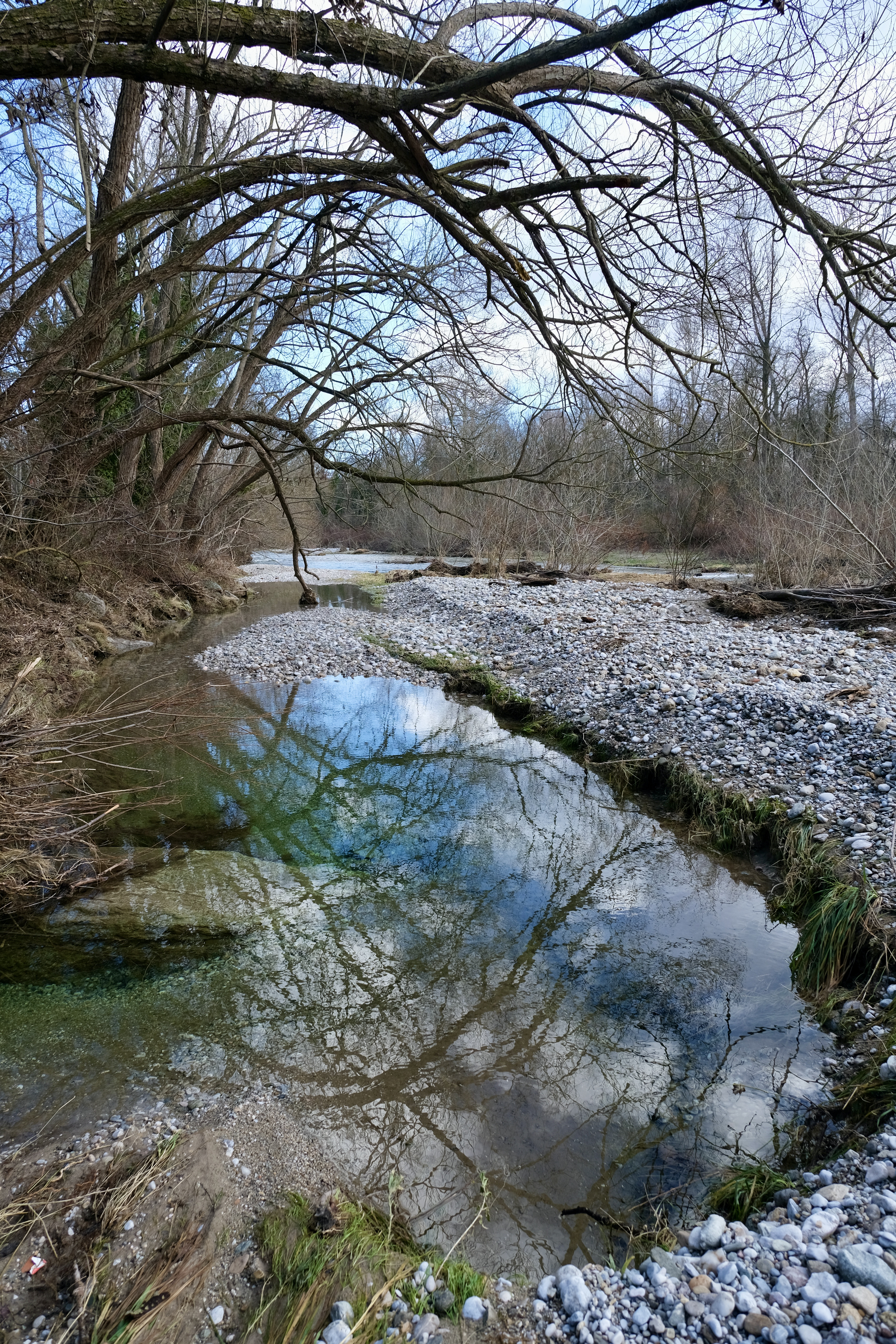
Shallows along the Leitha River near Lanzenkirchen

Around the turn to the 2nd millennium, the Hungarian frontier (Gyepű) ran along the Leitha shore, from 1156 onwards it formed the eastern border of the Duchy of Austria with fortresses erected at Wiener Neustadt, Bruck and Hainburg. The last Babenberg duke Frederick II of Austria was killed in the 1246 Battle of the Leitha River against King Béla IV of Hungary. The course of the border was confirmed in a 1411 deed issued by King Sigismund, when his daughter Elizabeth married the Habsburg duke Albert II of Austria. The placenames Cisleithania, Transleithania and Lajtabánság are all derived from the Leitha River. After the Austro-Hungarian Compromise of 1867, which created the Dual Monarchy, Transleithanien ("beyond the Leitha") was the Viennese colloquial word for the region beyond the Leitha (meaning Hungary or the Kingdom of Hungary), while Cisleithanien ("on this side of the Leitha") denoted the Austrian lands. These names reflected the Viennese and Austrian perspectives towards the rest of the Empire, because Vienna lay on 'this' side, and the other half, Hungary, lay on 'that' side. Nevertheless, the Leitha did not form the entire border between the two: for instance Galicia and Bukovina, which were part of Cisleithania, were north-east of Hungary. Likewise, the Morava River formed the border between Cisleithanian Moravia and the Transleithanian lands of present-day Slovakia (Upper Hungary).

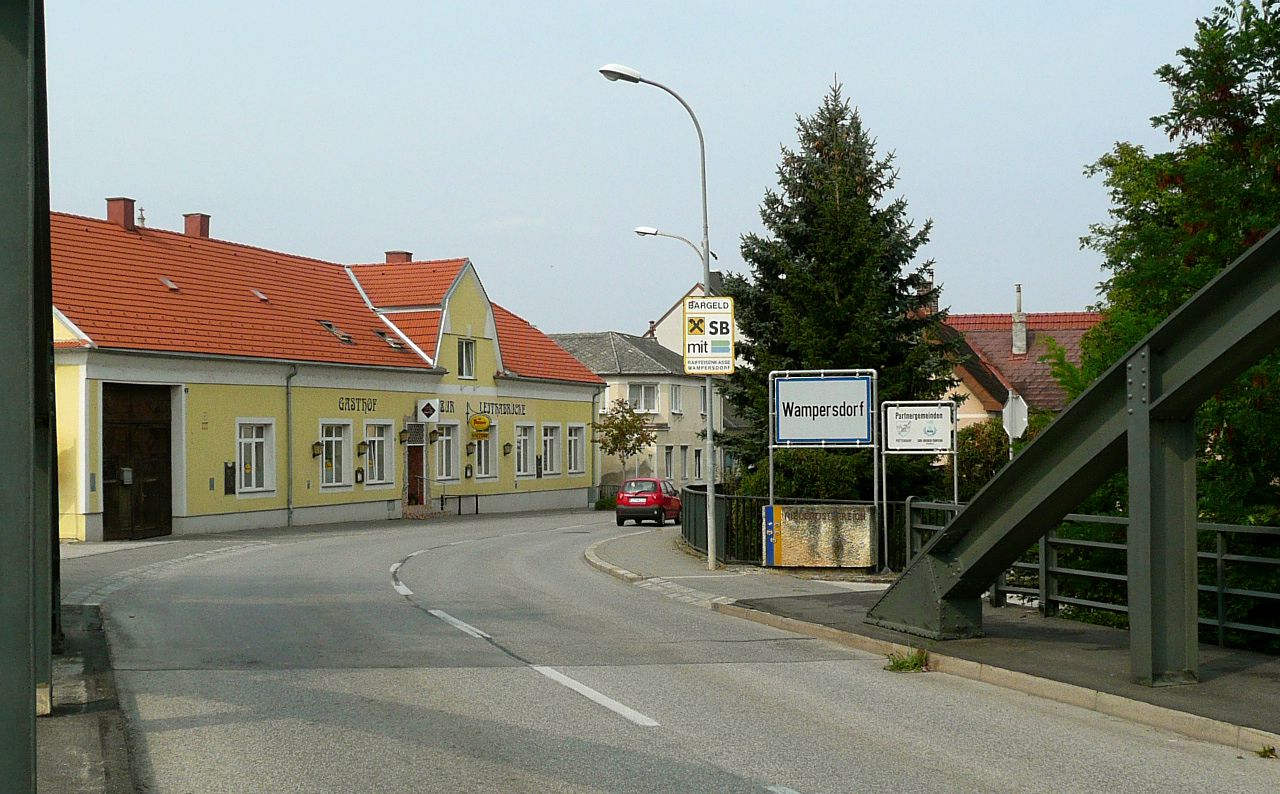
Leitha bridge between Wampersdorf (Pottendorf municipality) in Lower Austria and Wimpassing (Vimpác) in Burgenland

Upon the dissolution of Austria-Hungary after World War I, the 1920 Treaty of Trianon adjudicated the West Hungarian territory of the proclaimed Lajtabánság (Leitha Banat) to the Republic of Austria (as Burgenland), whereby the course of the river became an inner Austrian border.

== See also ==
- Cisleithania
- Transleithania
