= Mansberger =

Mansberger is a surname. Notable people with the surname include:

- Carmen Eva Nelken Mansberger (1898–1966), a.k.a. Magda Donato, Spanish writer, journalist, playwright, and actress
- Jürgen Mansberger (born 1988), Austrian association football player
