= Schützen =

Schützen may refer to:

- Schützen (military), a 19th-century German infantryman armed with a rifled musket and used in a skirmishing role
- Panzergrenadier, a German term for motorized or mechanized infantry, as introduced during World War II
- Schützen am Gebirge, a municipality in Burgenland, Austria
- Deutsch Schützen-Eisenberg, a municipality in Burgenland, Austria

== See also ==
- Schuetzen Park (Iowa) in Davenport
- Schuetzen Park (New Jersey) in North Bergen
