= Pannonia Railway =

Pannonia Railway is a railway line in Austria between Parndorf and Wulkaprodersdorf. At Parndorf it joins up with the historic Parndorf–Bratislava railway line. It is a key 40 kilometre rail route in Austria.

The line is run by Austrian Federal Railways (ÖBB).

== History ==
The line opened as the Sopron–Pozsony helyi érdekü vasut" (Pozsony = Bratislava) line on December 18, 1897. In 2010, previous rail routes and stations were assigned the new name 'Pannonia Railway' to describe the route.

In 2024, several of the stations were upgraded and modernised.

== Stations ==
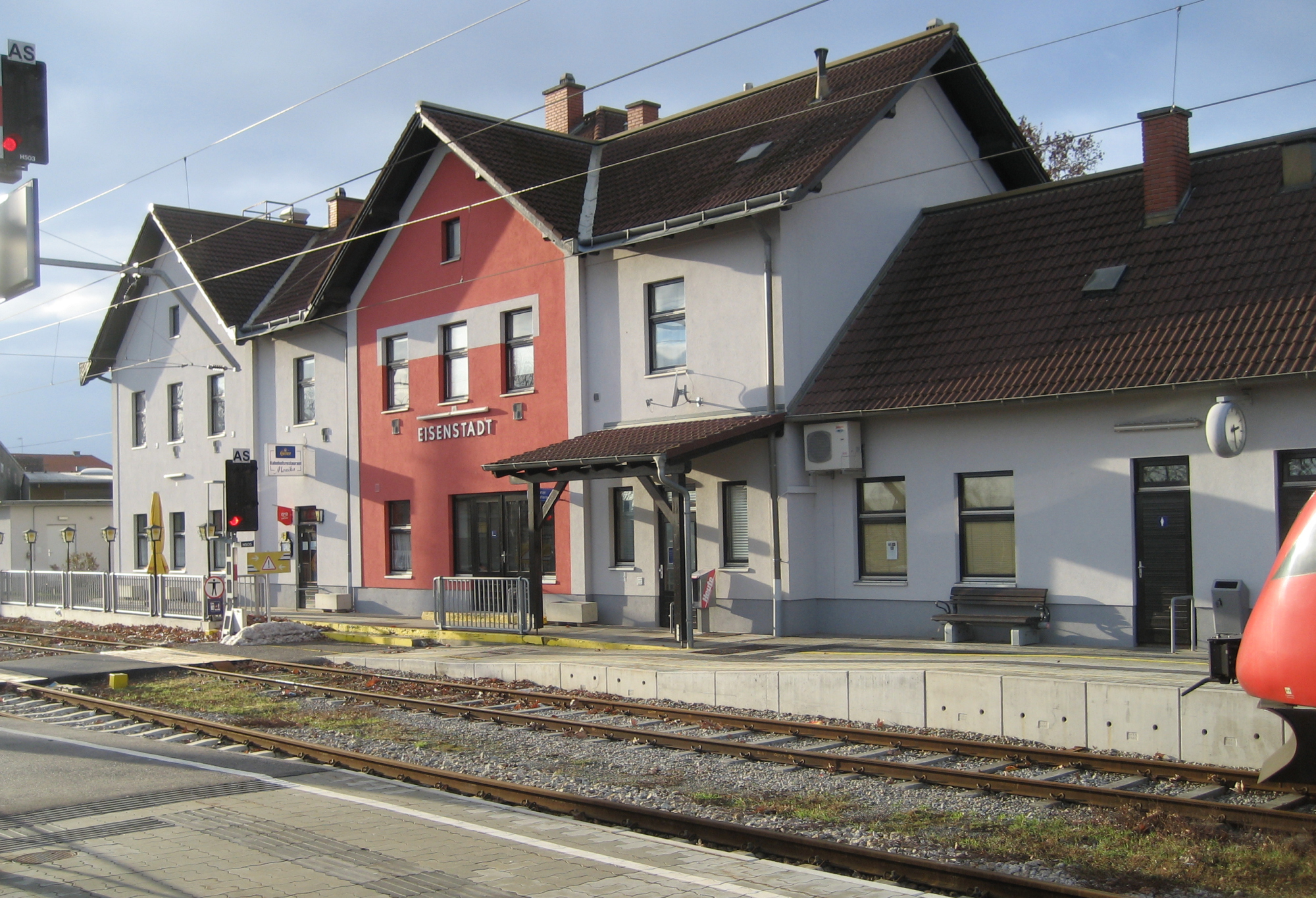
Eisenstadt rail station

- Wulkaprodersdorf
- Eisenstadt
- Schützen am Gebirge
- Donnerskirchen
- Breitenbrunn
- Winden am See
- Parndorf
