= Oslip =

- Municipality
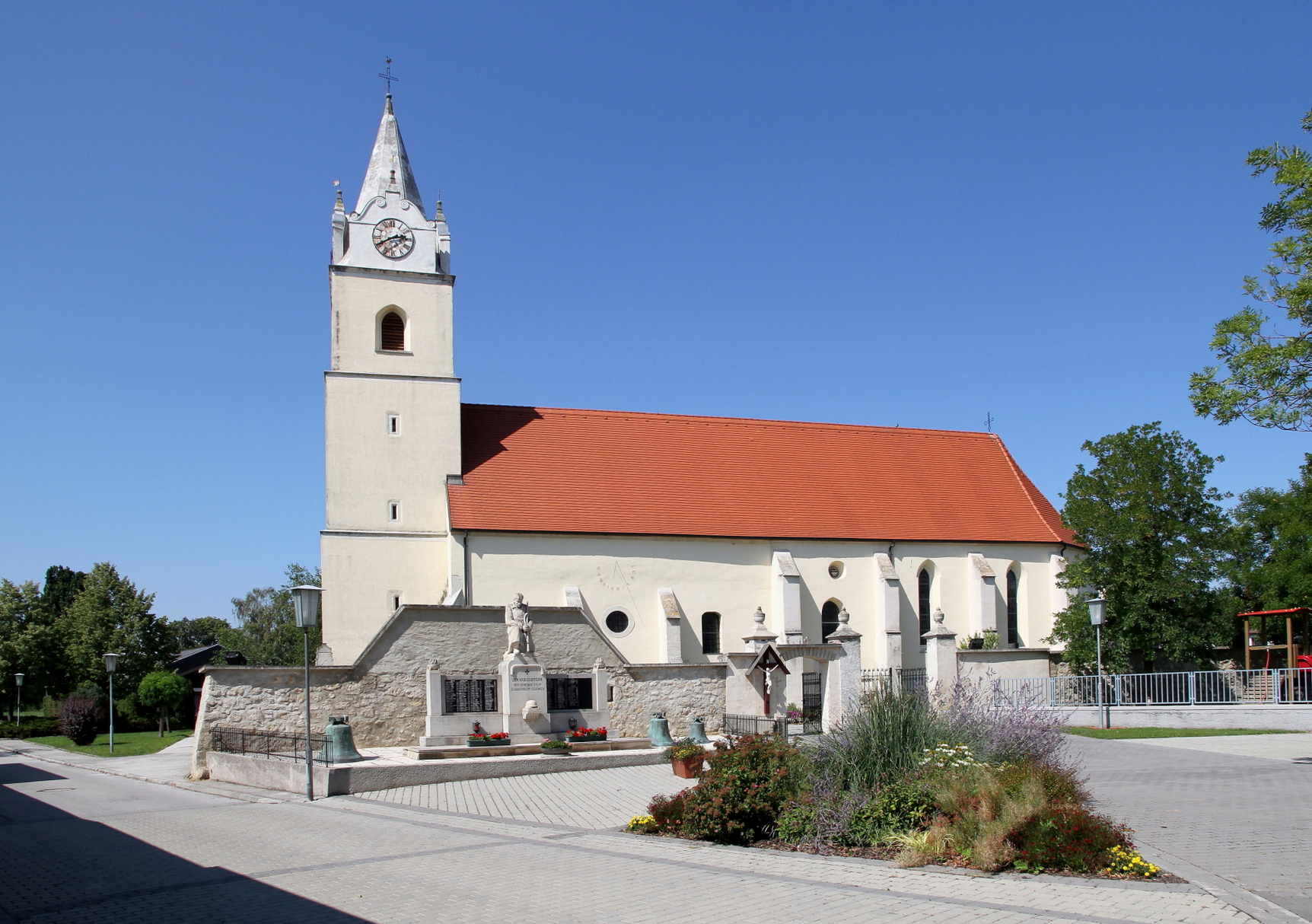
- Church of the Assumption of the Virgin Mary

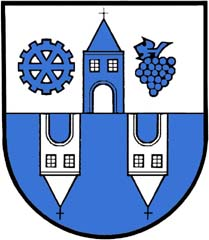
- Coat of arms

- Location within Burgenland Location within Austria
- Coordinates: 47°50′N 16°37′E
- Country: Austria
- State: Burgenland
- District: Eisenstadt-Umgebung

Government
  - Mayor: Stefan Bubich (ÖVP)

Area
  - Total: 17.83 km^{2} (6.88 sq mi)

Population (2022-01-01)
  - Total: 1,291
  - Density: 72.41/km^{2} (187.5/sq mi)
- Time zone: UTC+1 (CET)
  - Summer (DST): UTC+2 (CEST)
- Postal code: 7064
- Website: http://www.oslip.at/

Oslip (German pronunciation: [ˈɔslɪp]; Hungarian: Oszlop, Croatian: Uzlop) is a town in Burgenland, Austria, known for its viticulture. It lies in the Eisenstadt-Umgebung district in the state of Burgenland.

Oslip is located about 60 km south of Vienna.

== History ==
Oslip was known as Oszlop, Sopron, Hungary prior to the breakup of the Austro-Hungarian Empire in 1918.

== Culture ==
Tamburica Uzlop, tamburica orchestra of Burgenland Croats, was established in 1962. It organizes annual Tamburica bal ("Tamburica ball") and Christmas concert.

== Population ==
Historical population
Year	Pop.	±%
1869	1,114	—
1880	1,156	+3.8%
1890	1,264	+9.3%
1900	1,298	+2.7%
1910	1,288	−0.8%
1923	1,320	+2.5%
1934	1,260	−4.5%
1939	1,250	−0.8%
1951	1,204	−3.7%
1961	1,245	+3.4%
1971	1,245	+0.0%
1981	1,174	−5.7%
1991	1,190	+1.4%
2001	1,323	+11.2%
2011	1,317	−0.5%
2021	1,271	−3.5%
