= Oggau am Neusiedler See =

- Municipality
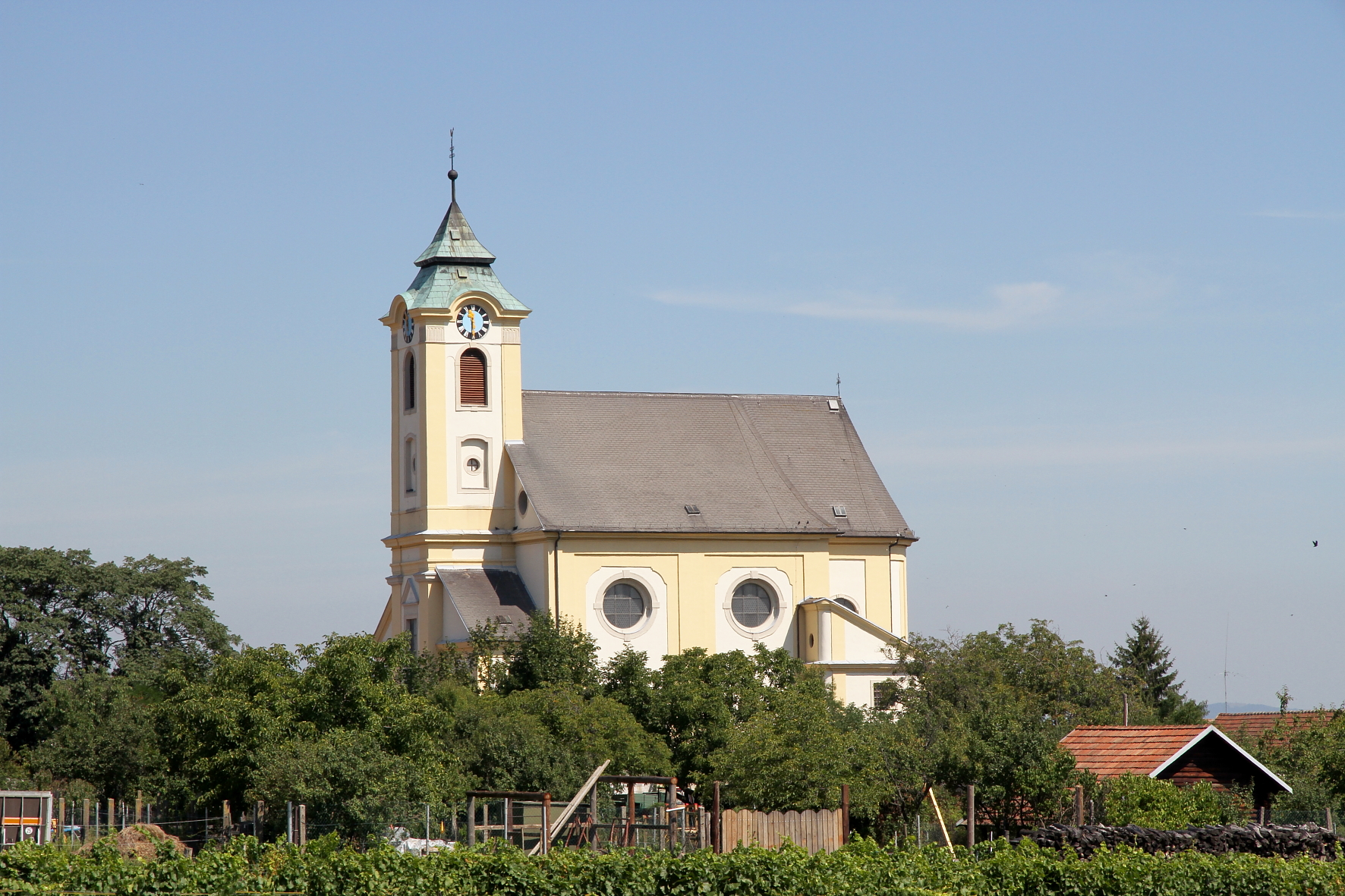
- Church of the Holy Trinity, Simon and Jude

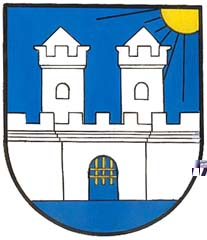
- Coat of arms

- Location within Austria
- Coordinates: 47°50′N 16°40′E
- Country: Austria
- State: Burgenland
- District: Eisenstadt-Umgebung

Government
  - Mayor: Thomas Schmid (SPÖ)

Area
  - Total: 52.19 km^{2} (20.15 sq mi)
- Elevation: 130 m (430 ft)

Population (2018-01-01)
  - Total: 1,739
  - Density: 33.32/km^{2} (86.30/sq mi)
- Time zone: UTC+1 (CET)
  - Summer (DST): UTC+2 (CEST)
- Postal code: 7063
- Website: Official website

Oggau am Neusiedler See (Croatian: Cokula, Hungarian: Oka) is a town in the district of Eisenstadt-Umgebung in the Austrian state of Burgenland.

== Population ==
Historical population
Year	Pop.	±%
1869	1,313	—
1880	1,425	+8.5%
1890	1,586	+11.3%
1900	1,591	+0.3%
1910	1,670	+5.0%
1923	1,628	−2.5%
1934	1,698	+4.3%
1939	1,769	+4.2%
1951	1,712	−3.2%
1961	1,790	+4.6%
1971	1,847	+3.2%
1981	1,873	+1.4%
1991	1,876	+0.2%
2001	1,811	−3.5%
2011	1,803	−0.4%
2021	1,738	−3.6%
