= Zagersdorf =

- Municipality
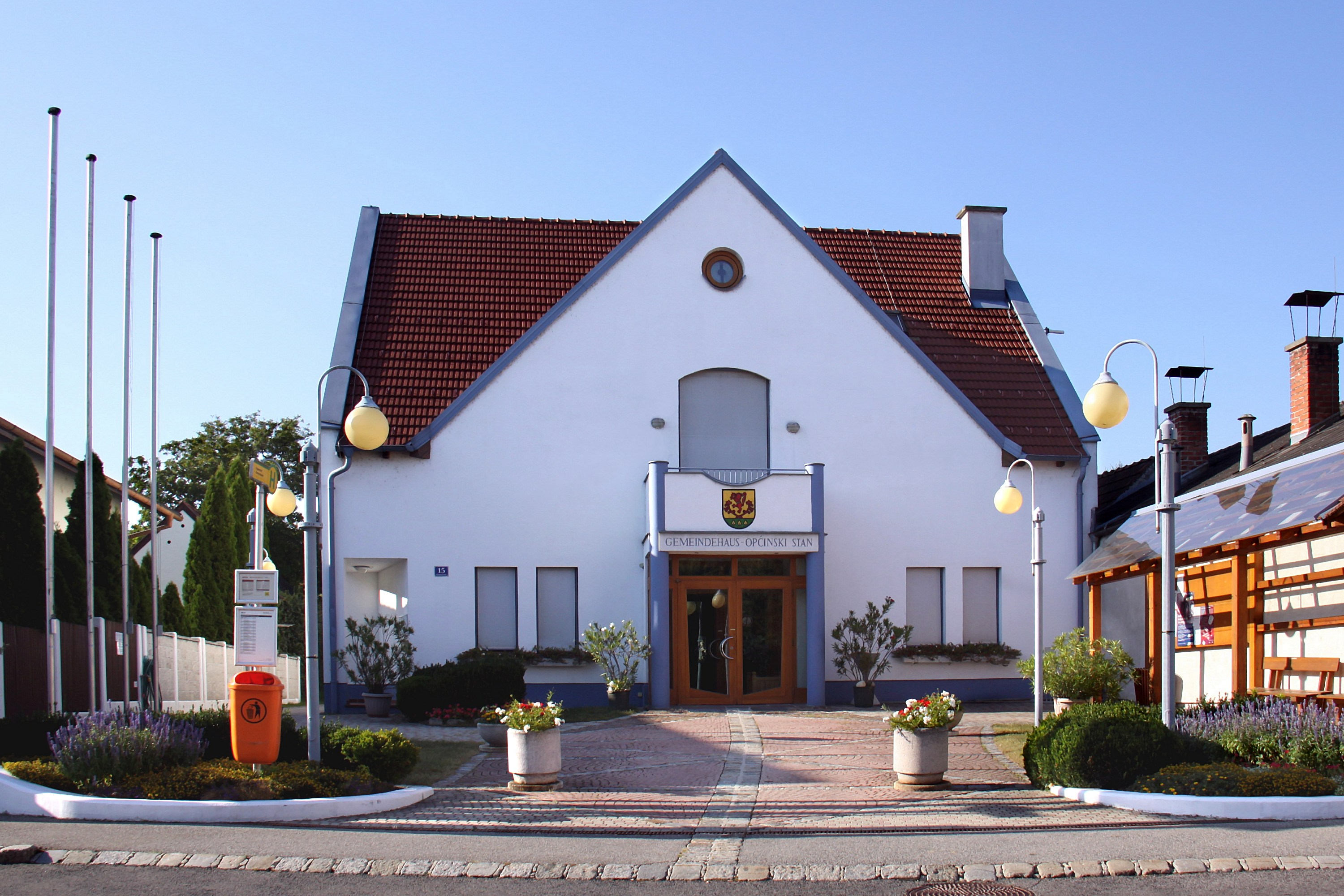
- Municipal office

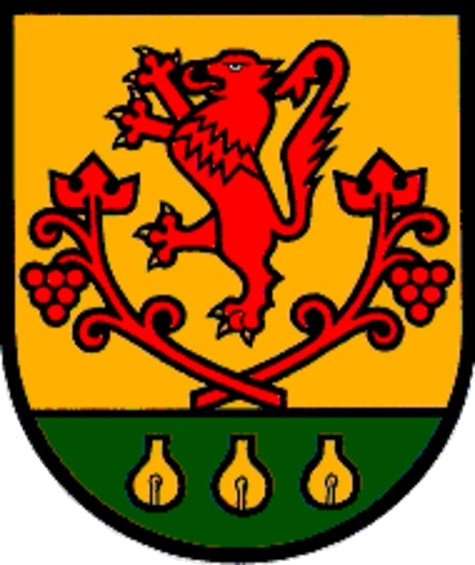
- Coat of arms

- Location within Austria
- Coordinates: 47°46′N 16°31′E
- Country: Austria
- State: Burgenland
- District: Eisenstadt-Umgebung

Government
  - Mayor: Helmut Zakall (SPÖ)

Area
  - Total: 7.3 km^{2} (2.8 sq mi)
- Elevation: 174 m (571 ft)

Population (2022-01-01)
  - Total: 1,114
  - Density: 150/km^{2} (400/sq mi)
- Time zone: UTC+1 (CET)
  - Summer (DST): UTC+2 (CEST)
- Postal code: 7012
- Area code: +43 2687
- Website: www.zagersdorf.at

Zagersdorf (Croatian: Cogrštof, Hungarian: Zárány) is a town in the district of Eisenstadt-Umgebung in the Austrian state of Burgenland.

== Population ==
Historical population
Year	Pop.	±%
1869	662	—
1880	686	+3.6%
1890	720	+5.0%
1900	817	+13.5%
1910	832	+1.8%
1923	889	+6.9%
1934	941	+5.8%
1939	914	−2.9%
1951	901	−1.4%
1961	884	−1.9%
1971	853	−3.5%
1981	847	−0.7%
1991	921	+8.7%
2001	900	−2.3%
2011	967	+7.4%
2021	1,101	+13.9%
