= Stotzing =

- Municipality
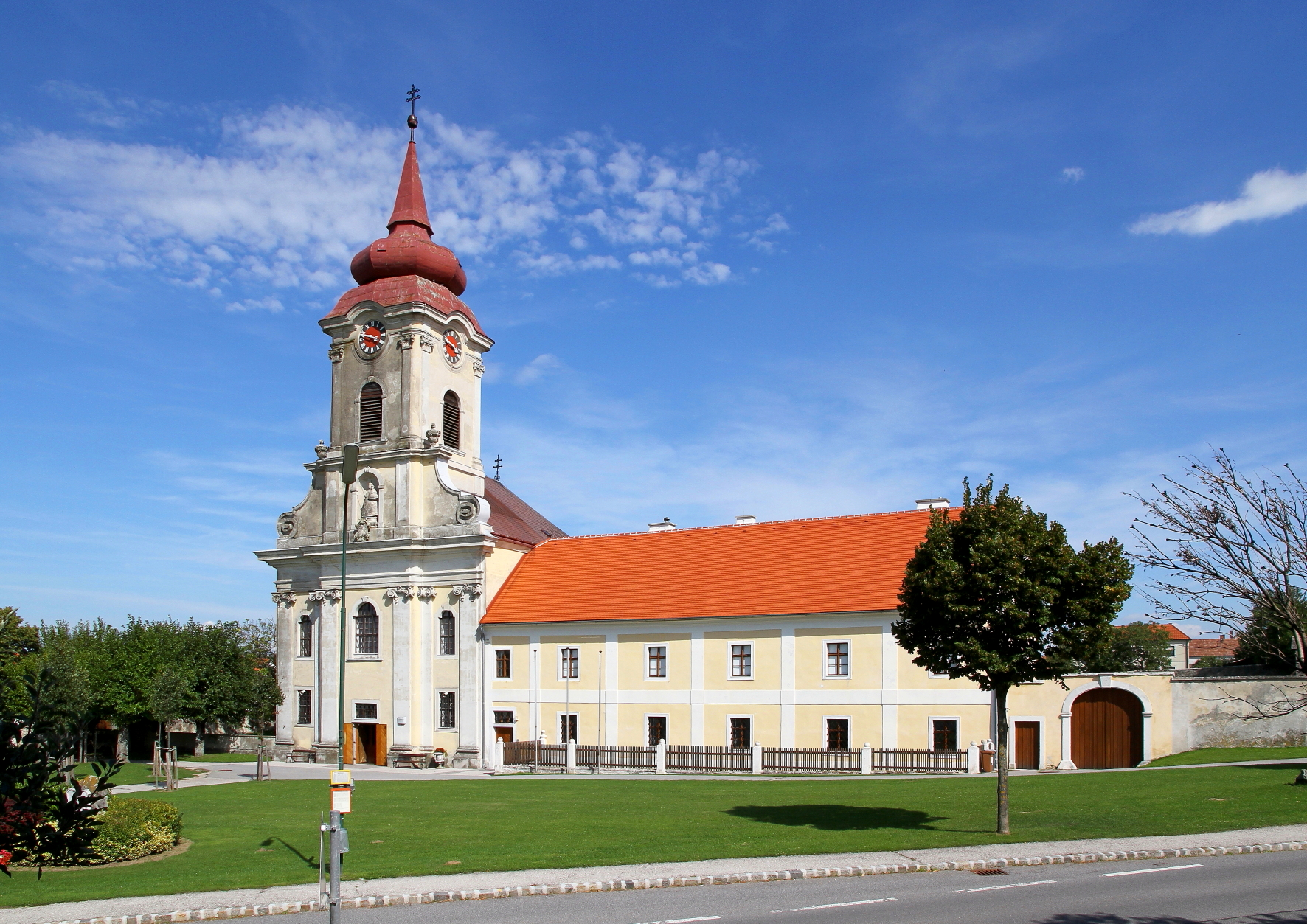
- Church of Saint John the Baptist

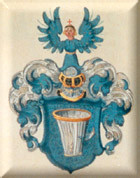
- Coat of arms

- Location within Austria
- Coordinates: 47°54′N 16°33′E
- Country: Austria
- State: Burgenland
- District: Eisenstadt-Umgebung

Government
  - Mayor: Wolfgang Kostenwein (ÖVP)

Area
  - Total: 12.91 km^{2} (4.98 sq mi)

Population (2022-01-01)
  - Total: 825
  - Density: 63.9/km^{2} (166/sq mi)
- Time zone: UTC+1 (CET)
  - Summer (DST): UTC+2 (CEST)
- Postal code: 2443

Stotzing (Hungarian: Lajtaszék) is a town in the district of Eisenstadt-Umgebung in the Austrian state of Burgenland.

== Geography ==
Stotzing lies in northern Burgenland, near the state capital of Eisenstadt.
