= Winden am See =

- Municipality
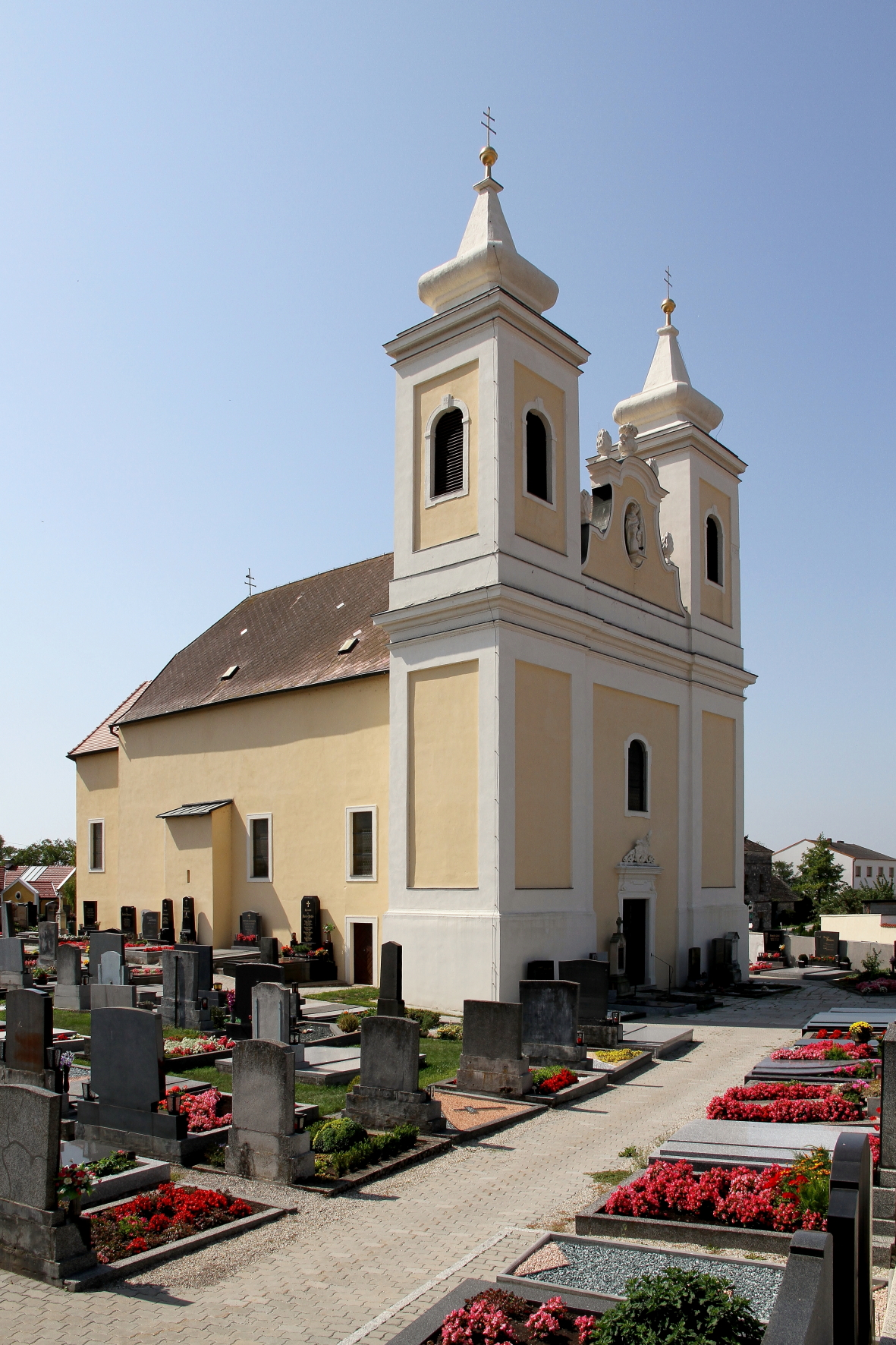
- Saint Florian Church

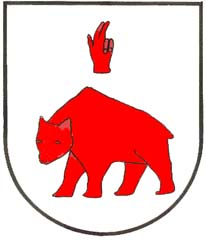
- Coat of arms

- Location within Austria
- Coordinates: 47°57′N 16°45′E
- Country: Austria
- State: Burgenland
- District: Neusiedl am See

Government
  - Mayor: Erwin Preiner (SPÖ)

Area
  - Total: 13.51 km^{2} (5.22 sq mi)
- Elevation: 124 m (407 ft)

Population (2018-01-01)
  - Total: 1,315
  - Density: 97.34/km^{2} (252.1/sq mi)
- Time zone: UTC+1 (CET)
  - Summer (DST): UTC+2 (CEST)
- Postal code: 7092
- Website: www.winden.at

Winden am See (Hungarian: Sásony) is a town in the district of Neusiedl am See in the Austrian state of Burgenland.

== Population ==
Historical population
Year	Pop.	±%
1869	982	—
1880	1,005	+2.3%
1890	1,143	+13.7%
1900	1,101	−3.7%
1910	1,091	−0.9%
1923	1,064	−2.5%
1934	1,087	+2.2%
1939	1,070	−1.6%
1951	1,037	−3.1%
1961	1,004	−3.2%
1971	1,071	+6.7%
1981	1,084	+1.2%
1991	1,041	−4.0%
2001	1,125	+8.1%
2011	1,283	+14.0%

== Transport ==
The Pannonia Railway had a station in the community.
