= Wimpassing an der Leitha =

- Municipality
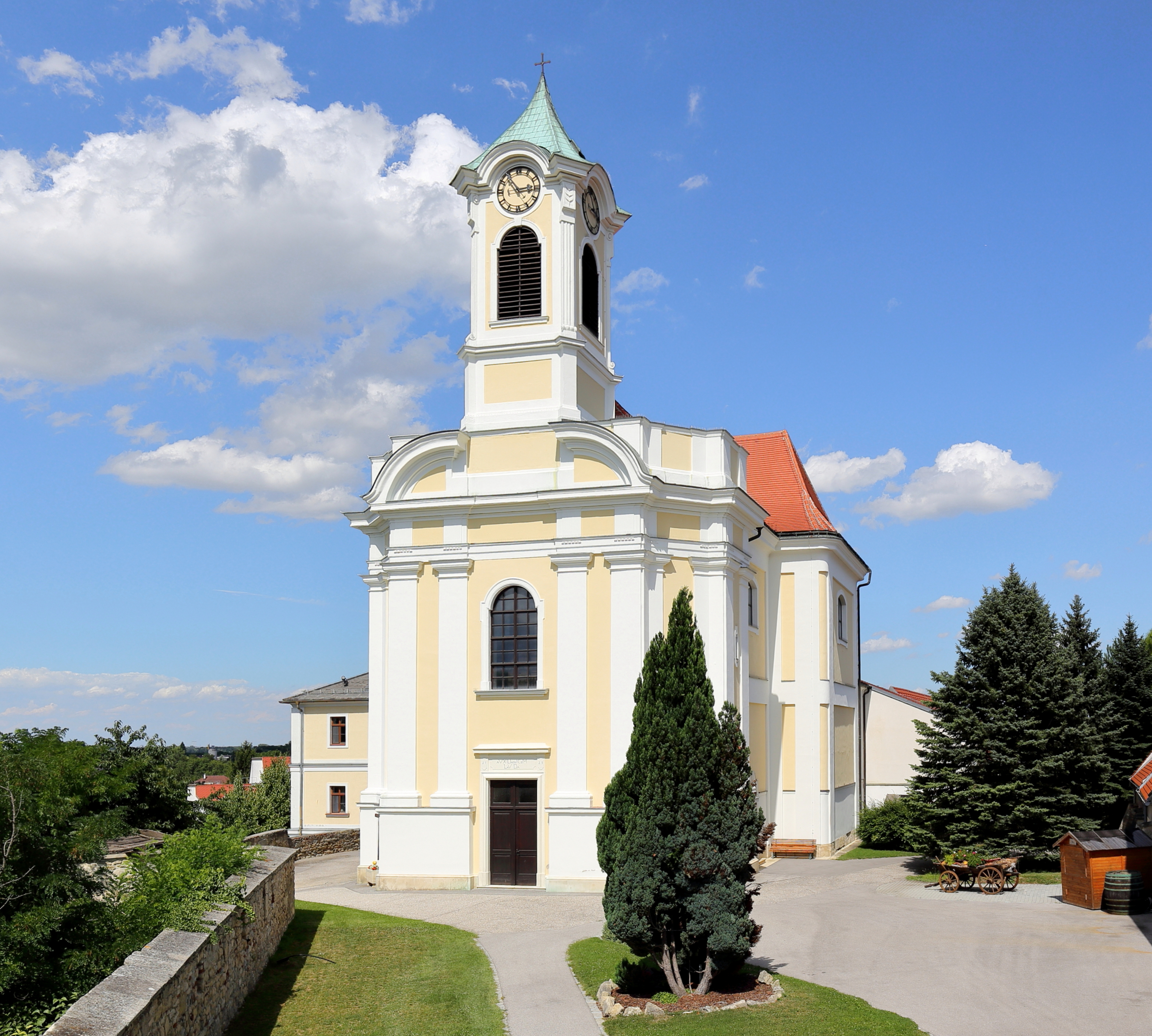
- Church of the Immaculate Conception of the Virgin Mary

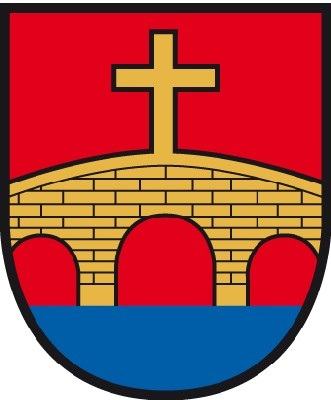
- Coat of arms

- Location within Austria
- Coordinates: 47°55′N 16°26′E
- Country: Austria
- State: Burgenland
- District: Eisenstadt-Umgebung

Government
  - Mayor: Ernst Edelmann (SPÖ)

Area
  - Total: 7.91 km^{2} (3.05 sq mi)
- Elevation: 222 m (728 ft)

Population (2018-01-01)
  - Total: 1,549
  - Density: 196/km^{2} (507/sq mi)
- Time zone: UTC+1 (CET)
  - Summer (DST): UTC+2 (CEST)
- Postal code: 2485

Wimpassing an der Leitha (Croatian: Vimpas, Hungarian: Vimpác) is a town in the district of Eisenstadt-Umgebung in the Austrian state of Burgenland.

== Nearby municipalities ==
- Wampersdorf (Lower Austrian municipality what has same word-root)
- Pottendorf
- Leithaprodersdorf
- Landegg

== Population ==
Historical population
| Year | Pop. | ±% |
|---|---|---|
| 1869 | 567 | — |
| 1880 | 611 | +7.8% |
| 1890 | 609 | −0.3% |
| 1900 | 766 | +25.8% |
| 1910 | 657 | −14.2% |
| 1923 | 779 | +18.6% |
| 1934 | 759 | −2.6% |
| 1939 | 646 | −14.9% |
| 1951 | 707 | +9.4% |
| 1961 | 703 | −0.6% |
| 1971 | 695 | −1.1% |
| 1981 | 746 | +7.3% |
| 1991 | 883 | +18.4% |
| 2001 | 1,094 | +23.9% |
| 2011 | 1,236 | +13.0% |
| 2021 | 1,702 | +37.7% |
