= Purbach am Neusiedlersee =

Purbach am Neusiedler See
- Municipality
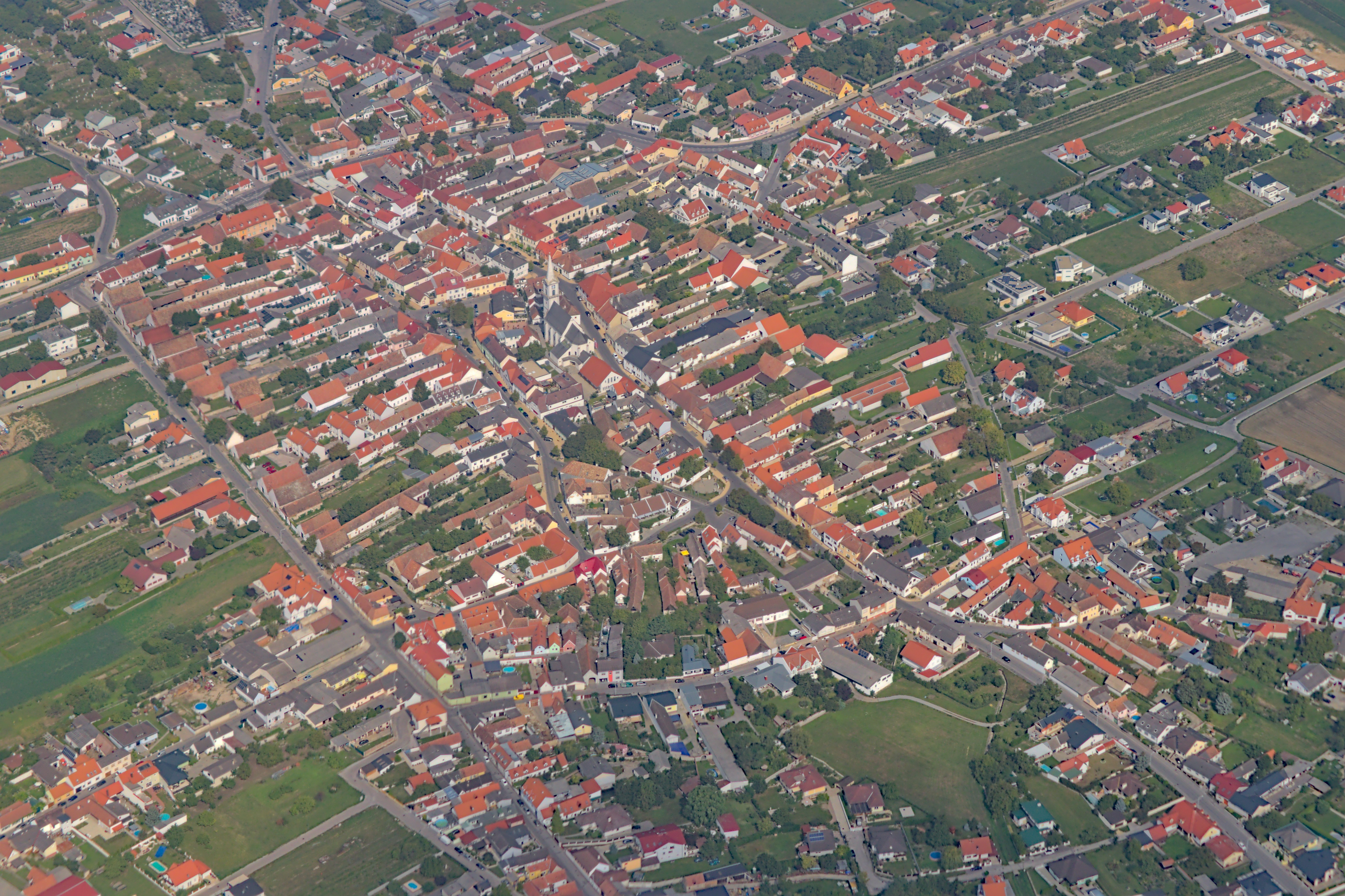
- Aerial view

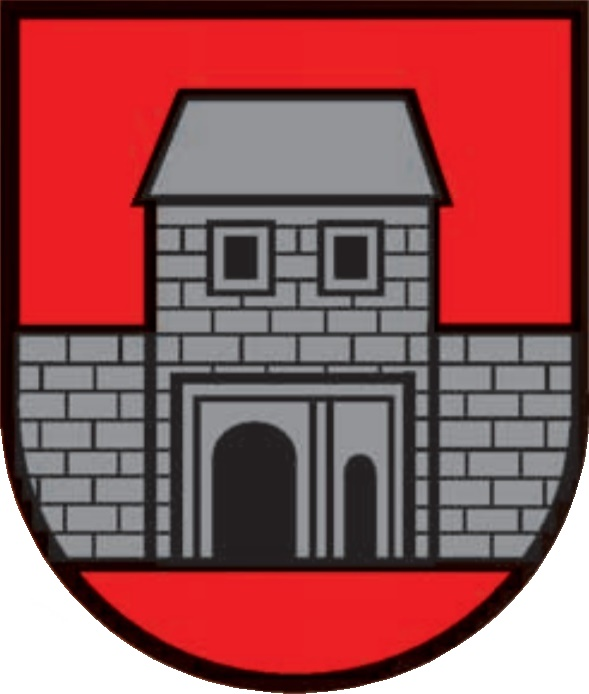
- Coat of arms

- Location within Austria
- Coordinates: 47°55′N 16°42′E
- Country: Austria
- State: Burgenland
- District: Eisenstadt-Umgebung

Government
  - Mayor: Richard Hermann (ÖVP)

Area
  - Total: 45.84 km^{2} (17.70 sq mi)
- Elevation: 128 m (420 ft)

Population (2018-01-01)
  - Total: 2,901
  - Density: 63.29/km^{2} (163.9/sq mi)
- Time zone: UTC+1 (CET)
  - Summer (DST): UTC+2 (CEST)
- Postal code: 7083
- Area code: +43 2683
- Website: Official website

Purbach am Neusiedlersee (Hungarian: Feketeváros), which is sometimes written as Purbach am Neusiedler See or Purbach am See, is a town in the Austrian state of Burgenland known for its viticulture. It lies in the Eisenstadt-Umgebung district.

Purbach is located at the western shores of Neusiedler See, the only steppe lake in Central Europe, and the only lake without natural outflow in Europe.

== Names ==
Purbach am Neusiedlersee, literally Purbach on Lake Neusiedl, is often referred to solely as Purbach. It was Feketeváros, Sopron, Hungary prior to the breakup of the Austro-Hungarian Empire.

It was known as Porpuh in Croatian.

== History ==
Settlement in Purbach can be traced to the 6th century BCE.

During Roman times, it lay on the famous amber trade route.

The first documented mention of the town occurred in 1270.

In 1918, the city changed from Feketeváros, Sopron, Hungary to present day Purbach am Neusiedlersee, Burgenland, Austria.

== Population ==
Historical population
| Year | Pop. | ±% |
|---|---|---|
| 1896 | 1,734 | — |
| 1880 | 1,683 | −2.9% |
| 1890 | 1,874 | +11.3% |
| 1900 | 1,794 | −4.3% |
| 1910 | 1,923 | +7.2% |
| 1923 | 1,899 | −1.2% |
| 1934 | 2,134 | +12.4% |
| 1939 | 2,169 | +1.6% |
| 1951 | 2,170 | +0.0% |
| 1961 | 2,184 | +0.6% |
| 1971 | 2,159 | −1.1% |
| 1981 | 2,346 | +8.7% |
| 1991 | 2,274 | −3.1% |
| 2001 | 2,346 | +3.2% |
| 2011 | 2,726 | +16.2% |
| 2021 | 2,899 | +6.3% |
