= Breitenbrunn am Neusiedler See =

Breitenbrunn
- Municipality
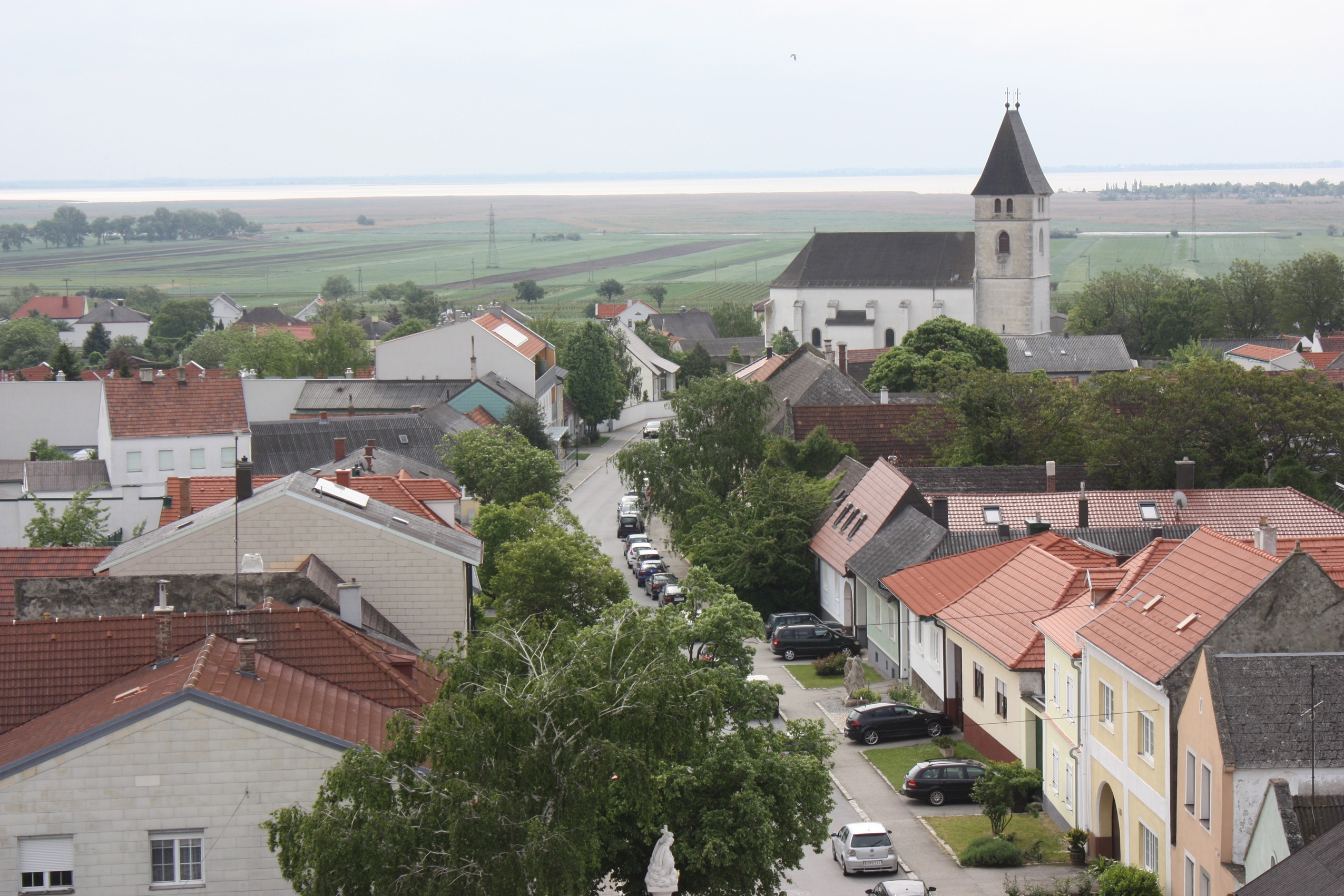
- Saint Cunigunde of Luxembourg Church. Lake Neusiedl in the background

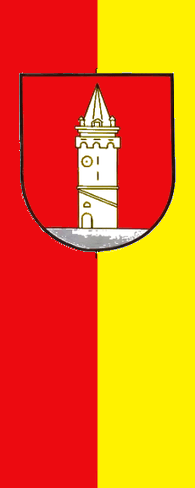
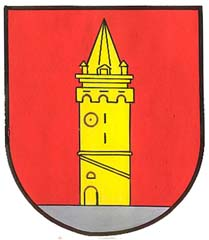
- Flag Coat of arms

- Location within Austria
- Coordinates: 47°56′45″N 16°43′58″E
- Country: Austria
- State: Burgenland
- District: Eisenstadt-Umgebung

Government
  - Mayor: Helmut Hareter (SPÖ)

Area
  - Total: 25.75 km^{2} (9.94 sq mi)

Population (2022-01-01)
  - Total: 1,890
  - Density: 73.4/km^{2} (190/sq mi)
- Time zone: UTC+1 (CET)
  - Summer (DST): UTC+2 (CEST)
- Postal code: 7091
- Area code: 02683
- Website: www.breitenbrunn.at

Breitenbrunn am Neusiedler See (Hungarian: Fertőszéleskút, Croatian: Patipron) is a small wine village in the district of Eisenstadt-Umgebung in the Austrian state of Burgenland.

== Population ==
Historical population
Year	Pop.	±%
1896	1,364	—
1880	1,338	−1.9%
1890	1,372	+2.5%
1900	1,343	−2.1%
1910	1,230	−8.4%
1923	1,242	+1.0%
1934	1,310	+5.5%
1939	1,321	+0.8%
1951	1,230	−6.9%
1961	1,211	−1.5%
1971	1,321	+9.1%
1981	1,395	+5.6%
1991	1,570	+12.5%
2001	1,702	+8.4%
2011	1,891	+11.1%
2021	1,883	−0.4%
