= Loretto, Austria =

Loretto
- Municipality
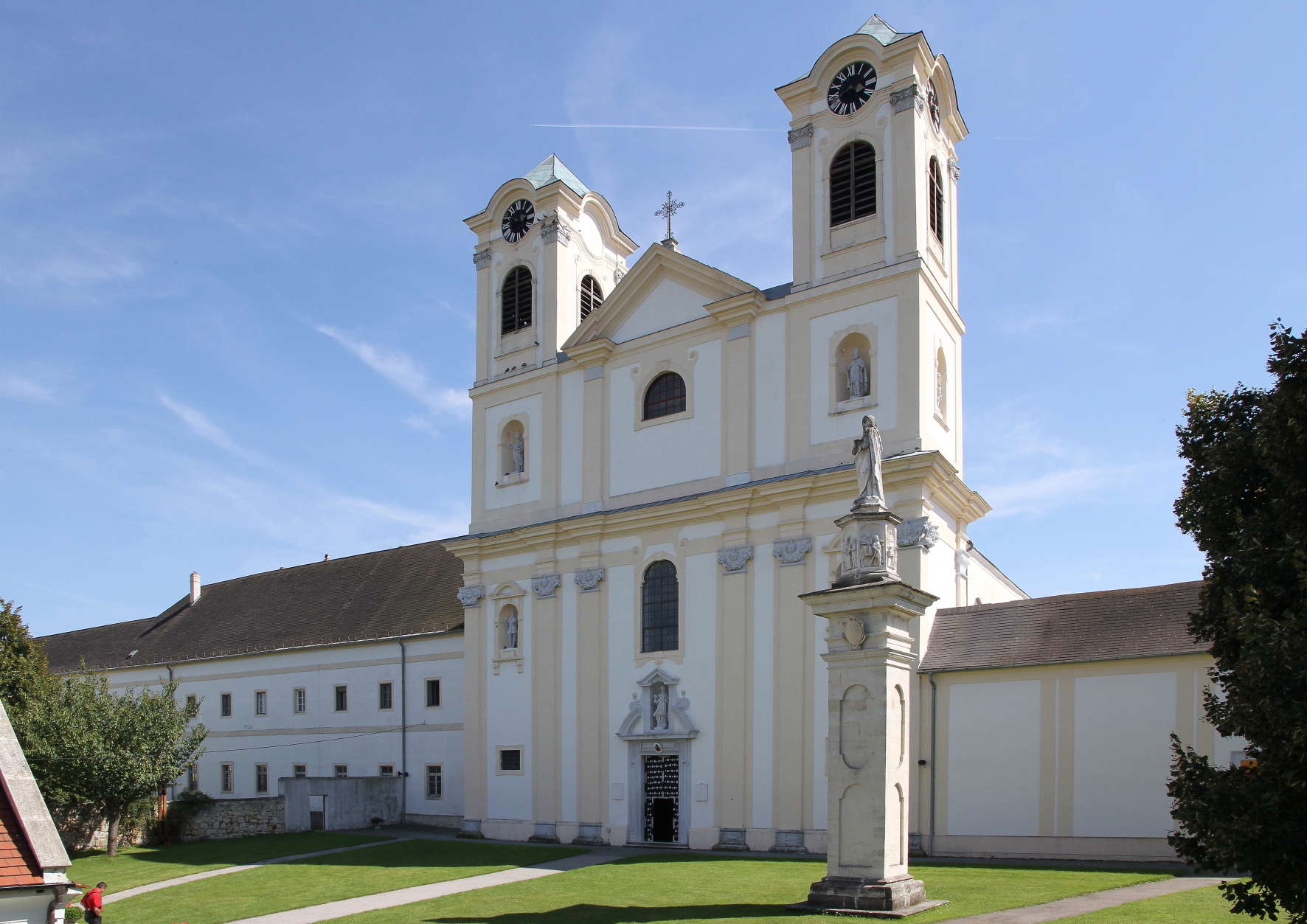
- Basilica minor of Maria Dolorosa

- Coat of arms

- Location within Austria
- Coordinates: 47°55′N 16°31′E
- Country: Austria
- State: Burgenland
- District: Eisenstadt-Umgebung

Government
  - Mayor: Markus Nitzky (ÖVP)

Area
  - Total: 2.38 km^{2} (0.92 sq mi)

Population (2018-01-01)
  - Total: 475
  - Density: 200/km^{2} (517/sq mi)
- Time zone: UTC+1 (CET)
  - Summer (DST): UTC+2 (CEST)
- Postal code: 2443
- Area code: 02255

Loretto (Hungarian: Lorettom) is a town in the district of Eisenstadt-Umgebung in the Austrian state of Burgenland.

== Population ==
Historical population
Year	Pop.	±%
1869	340	—
1880	355	+4.4%
1890	317	−10.7%
1900	306	−3.5%
1910	281	−8.2%
1923	283	+0.7%
1934	277	−2.1%
1939	269	−2.9%
1951	249	−7.4%
1961	246	−1.2%
1971	234	−4.9%
1981	270	+15.4%
1991	326	+20.7%
2001	363	+11.3%
2011	458	+26.2%
2021	476	+3.9%
