= Donnerskirchen =

- Municipality
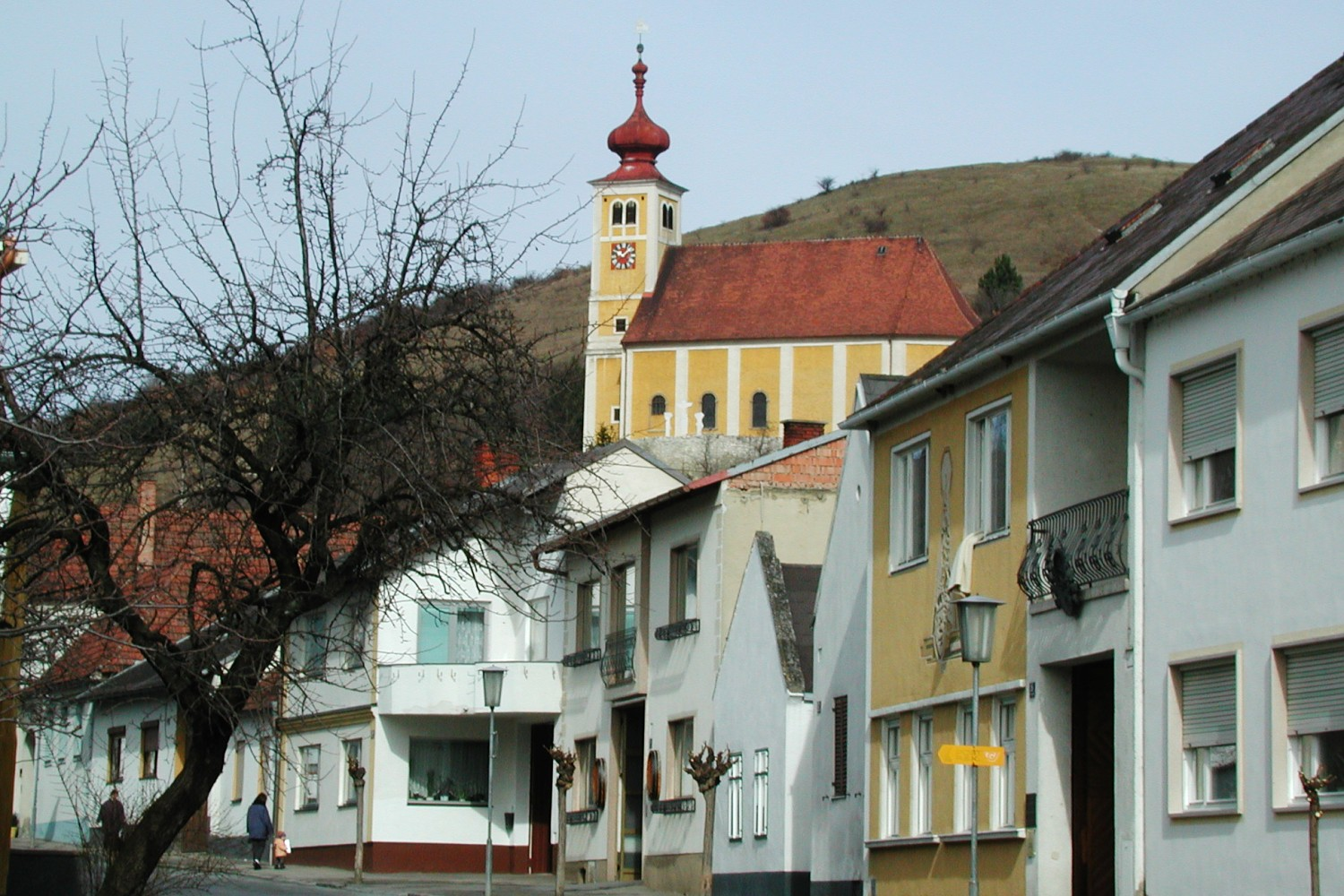
- Center of the town with Saint Martin Church

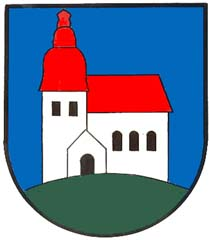
- Coat of arms

- Location within Austria
- Coordinates: 47°54′N 16°38′E
- Country: Austria
- State: Burgenland
- District: Eisenstadt-Umgebung

Government
  - Mayor: Johannes Mezgolits (ÖVP)

Area
  - Total: 33.87 km^{2} (13.08 sq mi)

Population (2022-01-01)
  - Total: 1,846
  - Density: 54.50/km^{2} (141.2/sq mi)
- Time zone: UTC+1 (CET)
  - Summer (DST): UTC+2 (CEST)
- Postal code: 7082
- Area code: 02683

Donnerskirchen (Hungarian: Fertőfehéregyháza, Croatian: Bijela Crikva) is a market town in the district Eisenstadt-Umgebung in the Austrian state of Burgenland.

== History ==
=== Early history and Celtic settlement ===
Before the birth of Christ, the area formed part of the Celtic kingdom of Noricum and lay within the area of the Celtic hilltop settlement of Burg.

At the foot of the Leitha Mountains, two La Tène-period burials were uncovered during an archaeological excavation carried out by the Burgenland State Museum in the Wolfsbachried area. The two rectangular burial shafts had been cut into calcareous sandstone and lined with wood. One grave contained the remains of a man aged between 50 and 70, the other those of a woman aged between 60 and 80. The graves were aligned on a south–north axis and had already been looted by the time they were discovered. Grave goods found in the man's burial included an iron spearhead, a spear ferrule, a razor, two whetstones, an incomplete iron fibula, a clay bowl, a clay bottle, and several fragments belonging to an iron sword scabbard. In the woman's grave, excavators found four bronze fibulae, a finger ring, a bowl, and two clay bottles.

=== Roman period ===
Under Roman rule, present-day Donnerskirchen lay within the province of Pannonia. The Amber Road, one of the Roman Empire’s most important trade routes, runs through the eastern part of the municipality along the edge of the reed belt of Lake Neusiedl.

=== Early modern and modern political history ===
In 1659, Emperor Leopold I granted Donnerskirchen market rights.

Like the rest of Burgenland, the town belonged to Hungary until 1920/21. From 1898 onward, due to the Magyarization policies of the government in Budapest, the town used a Hungarian name Sopronfehéregyháza. After the First World War, following protracted negotiations, German West Hungary was awarded to Austria under the Treaties of Saint-Germain and Trianon in 1919. Since 1921, the town has been part of the newly established federal state of Burgenland.

=== World War II ===
During World War II, Donnerskirchen formed part of the central construction sector (Eisenstadt) of the planned South-east wall. A small concentration camp was located near the village. In 1951, Nikolaus Schorn was convicted of the murder of Jewish slave laborers in the Donnerskirchen camp in January, 1945, and sentenced to life imprisonment. Schorn was head of the camp. Most of his victims were Hungarian Jews.

== Population ==
Historical population
Year	Pop.	±%
1869	1,649	—
1880	1,576	−4.4%
1890	1,799	+14.1%
1900	1,783	−0.9%
1910	1,741	−2.4%
1923	1,824	+4.8%
1934	1,842	+1.0%
1939	1,856	+0.8%
1951	1,622	−12.6%
1961	1,646	+1.5%
1971	1,593	−3.2%
1981	1,576	−1.1%
1991	1,556	−1.3%
2001	1,649	+6.0%
2011	1,729	+4.9%
2011	1,719	−0.6%
2021	1,840	+7.0%

== Transport ==
The Pannonia Railway had a station in the community.

== See also ==
- The Holocaust
