= Zillingtal =

- Municipality
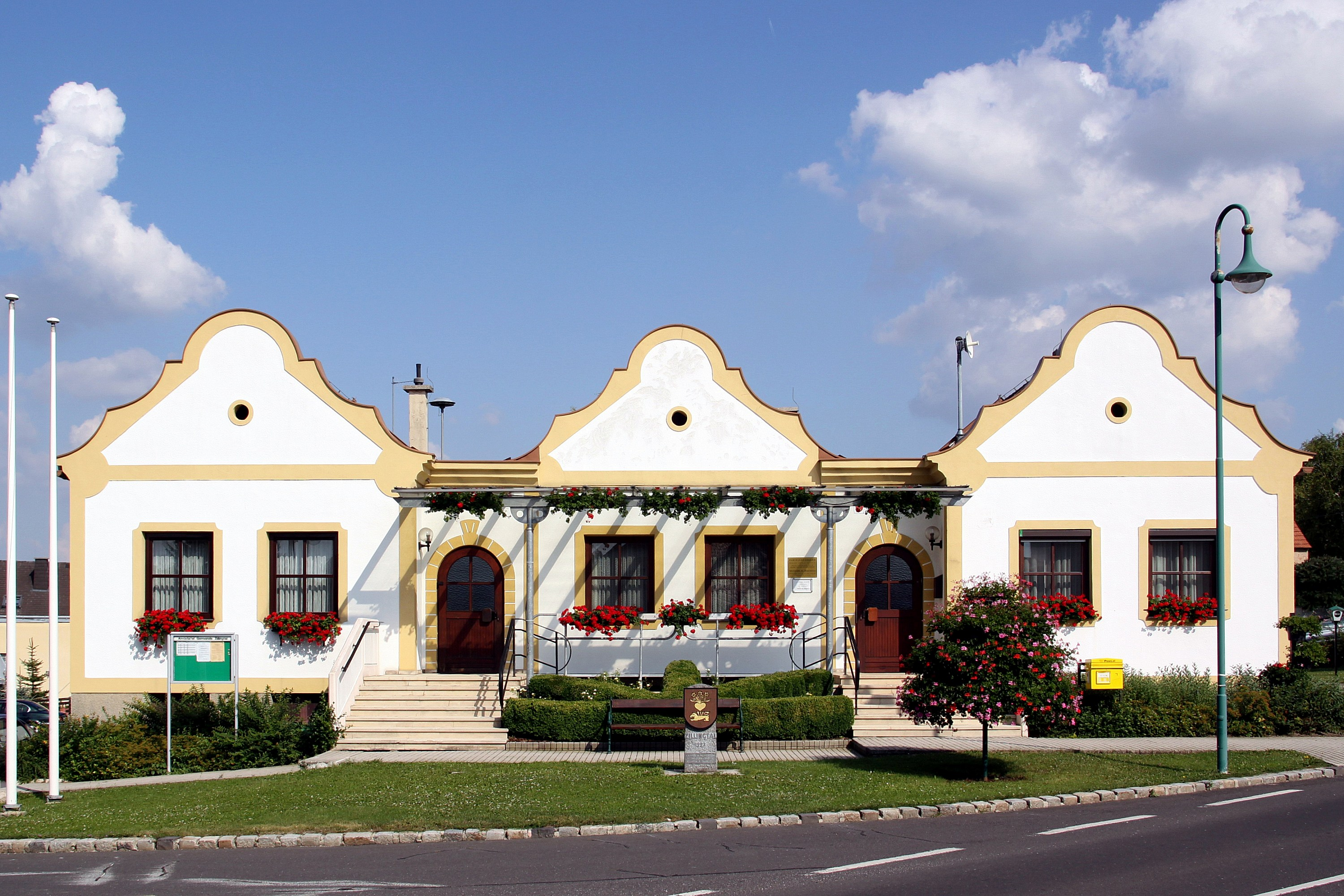
- Municipal office

- Coat of arms

- Location within Austria
- Coordinates: 47°49′N 16°25′E
- Country: Austria
- State: Burgenland
- District: Eisenstadt-Umgebung

Government
  - Mayor: Eva Karacson (SPÖ)

Area
  - Total: 13.1 km^{2} (5.1 sq mi)

Population (2022-01-01)
  - Total: 990
  - Density: 76/km^{2} (200/sq mi)
- Time zone: UTC+1 (CET)
  - Summer (DST): UTC+2 (CEST)
- Postal code: 7034
- Website: Official website

Zillingtal (Croatian: Celindof, Hungarian: Völgyfalva) is a community of 1,005 inhabitants (as of January 2023) in the West of the district of Eisenstadt-Umgebung in Austria's federal state Burgenland.

There is a minority population of Burgenland Croats.

== Population ==
Historical population
Year	Pop.	±%
1869	938	—
1880	732	−22.0%
1890	886	+21.0%
1900	969	+9.4%
1910	972	+0.3%
1923	1,014	+4.3%
1934	918	−9.5%
1939	911	−0.8%
1951	699	−23.3%
1961	636	−9.0%
1971	626	−1.6%
1981	584	−6.7%
1991	615	+5.3%
2001	860	+39.8%
2011	916	+6.5%
2021	991	+8.2%

== Geography ==
The community is situated in the North of Burgenland close to the Lower Austrian Border.

== History ==
Before Christ, the community was part of the Celtic kingdom Noricum and part of the environment of the Celtic hilltop settlement Burgberg.

Later on, under the governance of the Roman Empire, the community of Zillingtal was situated in the province of Pannonia.

There is an Avaric field of tombs from the 7th and 8th century, that has been discovered in 1927.

The name of Zillingtal was first mentioned officially in 1271. In 1529 and in 1683 Zillingtal was destroyed by the Ottoman Army. Afterwards, Croats refilled the population which had been destroyed by the Turkish wars. Until 1920/21 Zillingtal was part of Hungary, as well as the rest of Burgenland. From 1898 the hungarization politics enforced by the Hungarian government in Budapest made the use of the Hungarian name of Zillingtal, Völfyfalu, mandatory.

After the end of the First World War, Burgenland was, after a number of negotiations at St. Germain and Trianon in 1919 integrated to Austria.

== Politics ==
The municipal council has 15 seats as a whole.

== Culture ==
Local Burgenland Croats run Tamburica Celindof orchestra.
