= Eisenstadt–Umgebung District =

Coordinates: 47.838°N 16.540°E

Eisenstadt–Umgebung District Bezirk Eisenstadt–Umgebung
- District
- Country: Austria
- State: Burgenland
- Number of municipalities: 23
- Administrative seat: Eisenstadt

Government
  - District Governor: Birgit Wagner (since 2022)

Area
  - Total: 453.14 km^{2} (174.96 sq mi)

Population (2024)
  - Total: 44,787
  - Density: 98.837/km^{2} (255.99/sq mi)
- Time zone: UTC+01:00 (CET)
  - Summer (DST): UTC+02:00 (CEST)
- Vehicle registration: GS
- NUTS code: AT112
- District code: 103

The Bezirk Eisenstadt-Umgebung (Croatian: Kotar Željezno-okolica; Hungarian: Kismarton Járás) is an administrative district (Bezirk) in the federal state of Burgenland, Austria.

The area of the district is 455.5 km^{2}, with a population of 44,787 (2024), and a population density of 99 persons per km^{2}. The administrative center of the district is Eisenstadt (Croatian: Željezno), itself a statutory city outside the district.

== Administrative divisions ==
The district consists of the below municipalities and towns.

- Breitenbrunn
- Donnerskirchen
- Großhöflein
- Hornstein
- Klingenbach
- Leithaprodersdorf
- Loretto
- Mörbisch am See
- Müllendorf
- Neufeld an der Leitha
- Oggau am Neusiedler See
- Oslip
- Purbach am Neusiedlersee
- Sankt Margarethen im Burgenland
- Schützen am Gebirge
- Siegendorf
- Steinbrunn
- Stotzing
- Trausdorf an der Wulka
- Wimpassing an der Leitha
- Wulkaprodersdorf
- Zagersdorf
- Zillingtal
