= Schützen am Gebirge =

- Municipality
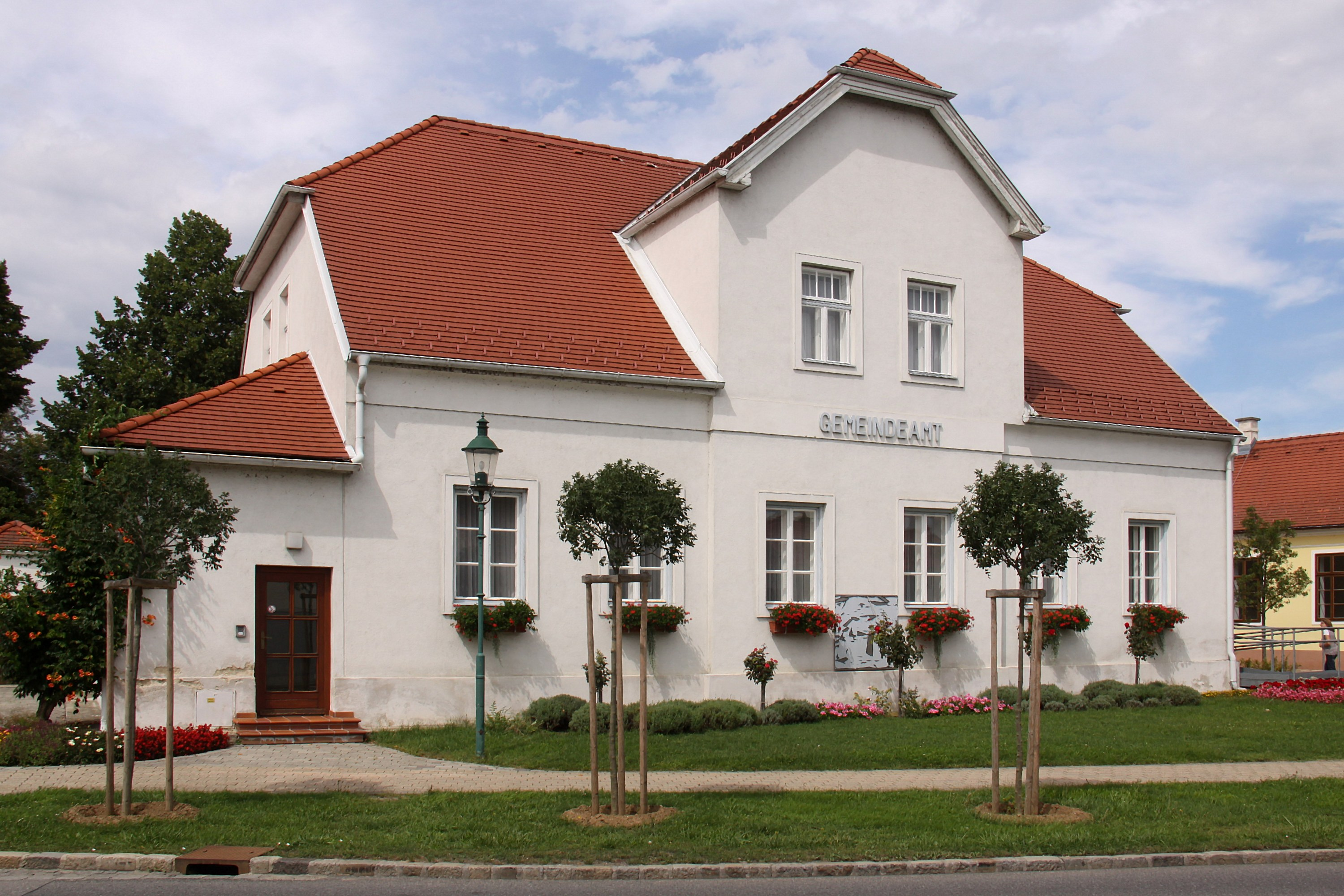
- Municipal office

- Coat of arms

- Location within Austria
- Coordinates: 47°51′N 16°37′E
- Country: Austria
- State: Burgenland
- District: Eisenstadt-Umgebung

Government
  - Mayor: Roman Zehetbauer (ÖVP)

Area
  - Total: 21.2 km^{2} (8.2 sq mi)
- Elevation: 130 m (430 ft)

Population (2022-01-01)
  - Total: 1,436
  - Density: 67.7/km^{2} (175/sq mi)
- Time zone: UTC+1 (CET)
  - Summer (DST): UTC+2 (CEST)
- Postal code: 7081
- Website: www.schuetzen-am-gebirge.at

Schützen am Gebirge (Hungarian: Sérc, Croatian: Česno) is a municipality in the Eisenstadt-Umgebung district in the Austrian state of Burgenland.

== History ==
The first written mention of Schützen am Gebirge was in 1211.

== Name ==
Gebirge means 'mountain range'. Schützen is a German plural noun for marksmen. The verb schützen is not related to this noun, but to schutz, meaning 'to guard' or 'to protect'.

== Population ==
Historical population
Year	Pop.	±%
1869	1,260	—
1880	1,225	−2.8%
1890	1,335	+9.0%
1900	1,386	+3.8%
1910	1,304	−5.9%
1923	1,325	+1.6%
1934	1,437	+8.5%
1939	1,677	+16.7%
1951	1,321	−21.2%
1961	1,291	−2.3%
1971	1,276	−1.2%
1981	1,316	+3.1%
1991	1,347	+2.4%
2001	1,360	+1.0%
2011	1,427	+4.9%
2021	1,417	−0.7%

== Transport ==
The Pannonia Railway had a station in the community.
