= Leithaprodersdorf =

- Municipality
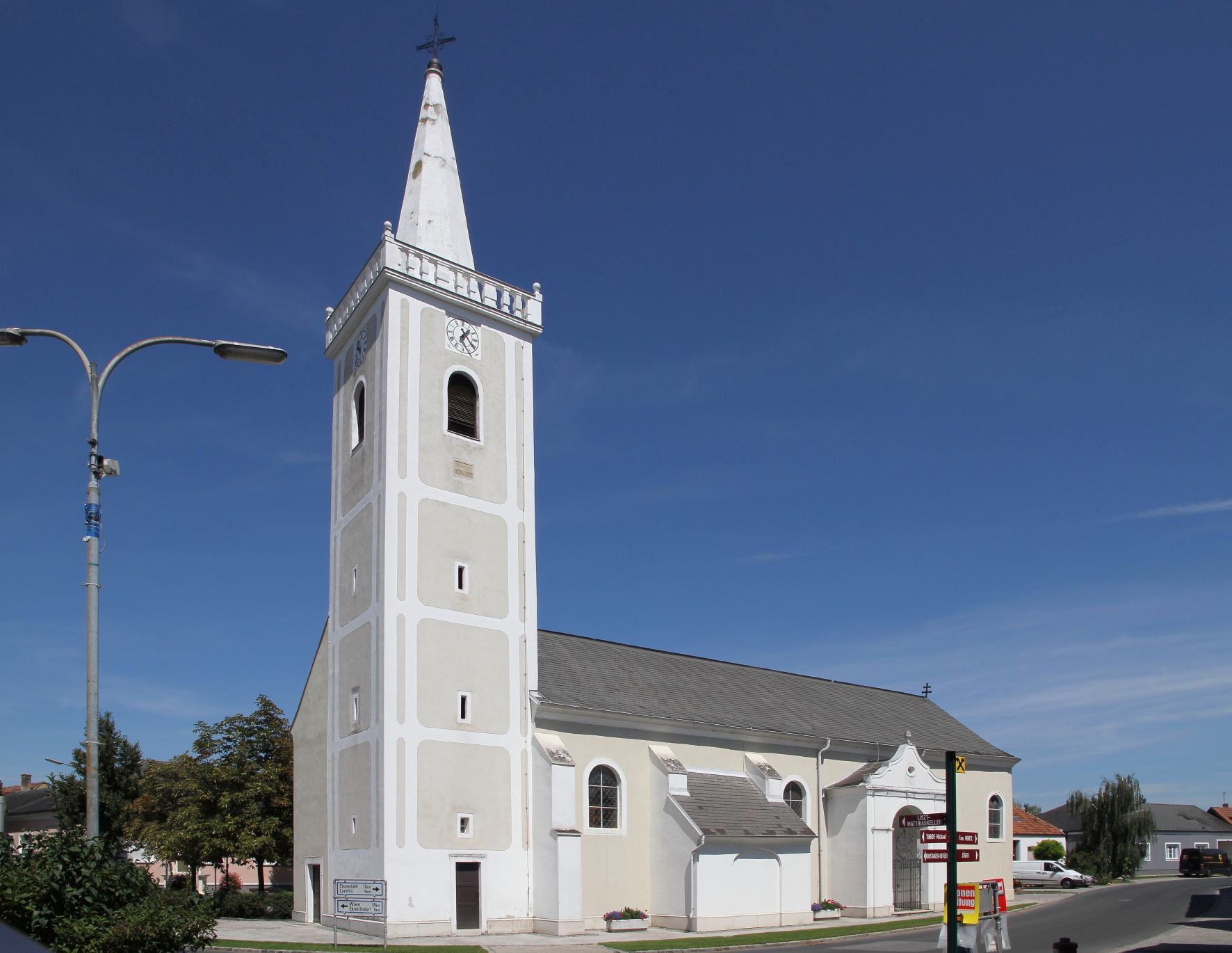
- Saint Mary Magdalene Church

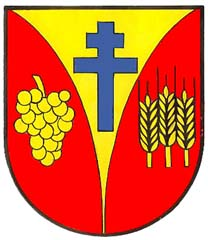
- Coat of arms

- Location within Austria Location within Burgenland
- Coordinates: 47°56′N 16°29′E
- Country: Austria
- State: Burgenland
- District: Eisenstadt-Umgebung

Government
  - Mayor: Martin Radatz (ÖVP)

Area
  - Total: 18.95 km^{2} (7.32 sq mi)
- Elevation: 196 m (643 ft)

Population (2022-01-01)
  - Total: 1,212
  - Density: 63.96/km^{2} (165.6/sq mi)
- Time zone: UTC+1 (CET)
  - Summer (DST): UTC+2 (CEST)
- Postal code: 2443
- Area code: 02255

Leithaprodersdorf, also (Leitha-Prodersdorf; Croatian: Lajtaproderštof, Hungarian: Lajtapordány, Lajtha-Pordány) is an Austrian town located in the Eisenstadt-Umgebung district of the state of Burgenland. The town is located on Burgenland's northern border with Lower Austria, near the state capital of Eisenstadt.

== History ==
Although the first historical mention of Leithaprodersdorf was in 1232, there is evidence of habitation in the area which predates the historical mention by several hundred years, dating back to the time of the Roman Empire. Previous archaeological expeditions have noted that the area around Leithaprodersdorf was heavily settled in ancient Roman times. Ancient archaeological finds in the area include two large estates and a watchtower. Additionally, the estates' graveyards have also been discovered, with some graves and even a few grave stones still intact. The names on the extant gravestones are Celtic-Roman in nature and are thought to date from between the 1st and 3rd centuries. Additionally, a burial site adorned with a cross dates from the 8th century. However, the largest and most visible evidence of the village's early history is the "G'Schlößl," a structure consisting of three concentric rings of walls and ditches, built in the 13th century out of the ruins of the Roman watchtower, and used as a dike to stay protected against flooding of the Leitha River.

The city later belonged to the Austro-Hungarian Empire, and because of its policy of Magyarization, the name of the settlement was changed to Lajtapordány. After the end of World War I, the city was transferred to the newly split country of Austria. Since 1921, it has been a part of the state of Burgenland.

== Population ==
Historical population
Year	Pop.	±%
1869	749	—
1880	812	+8.4%
1890	829	+2.1%
1900	809	−2.4%
1910	821	+1.5%
1923	834	+1.6%
1934	841	+0.8%
1939	842	+0.1%
1951	857	+1.8%
1961	882	+2.9%
1971	973	+10.3%
1981	989	+1.6%
1991	1,043	+5.5%
2001	1,181	+13.2%
2011	1,155	−2.2%
2021	1,217	+5.4%

== Gallery ==
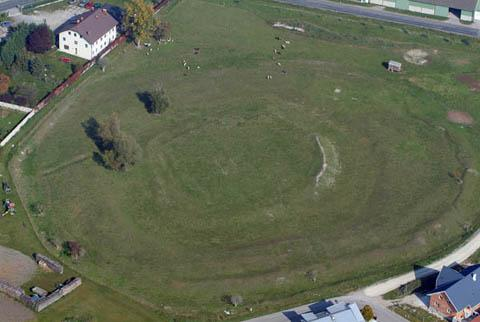

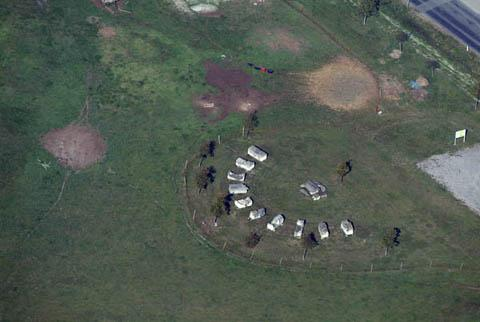

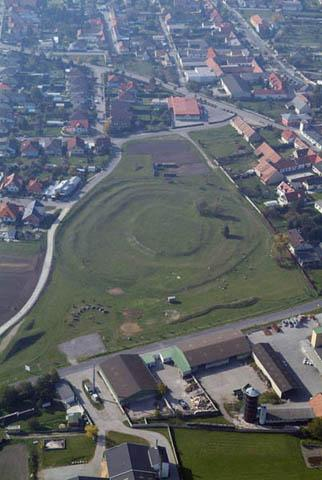

== See also ==
- Deutsch-Brodersdorf (Seibersdorf), a neighboring village
- Wulka·prodersdorf (means "Prodersdorf" on the Wulka)
