= Seibersdorf =

- Municipality
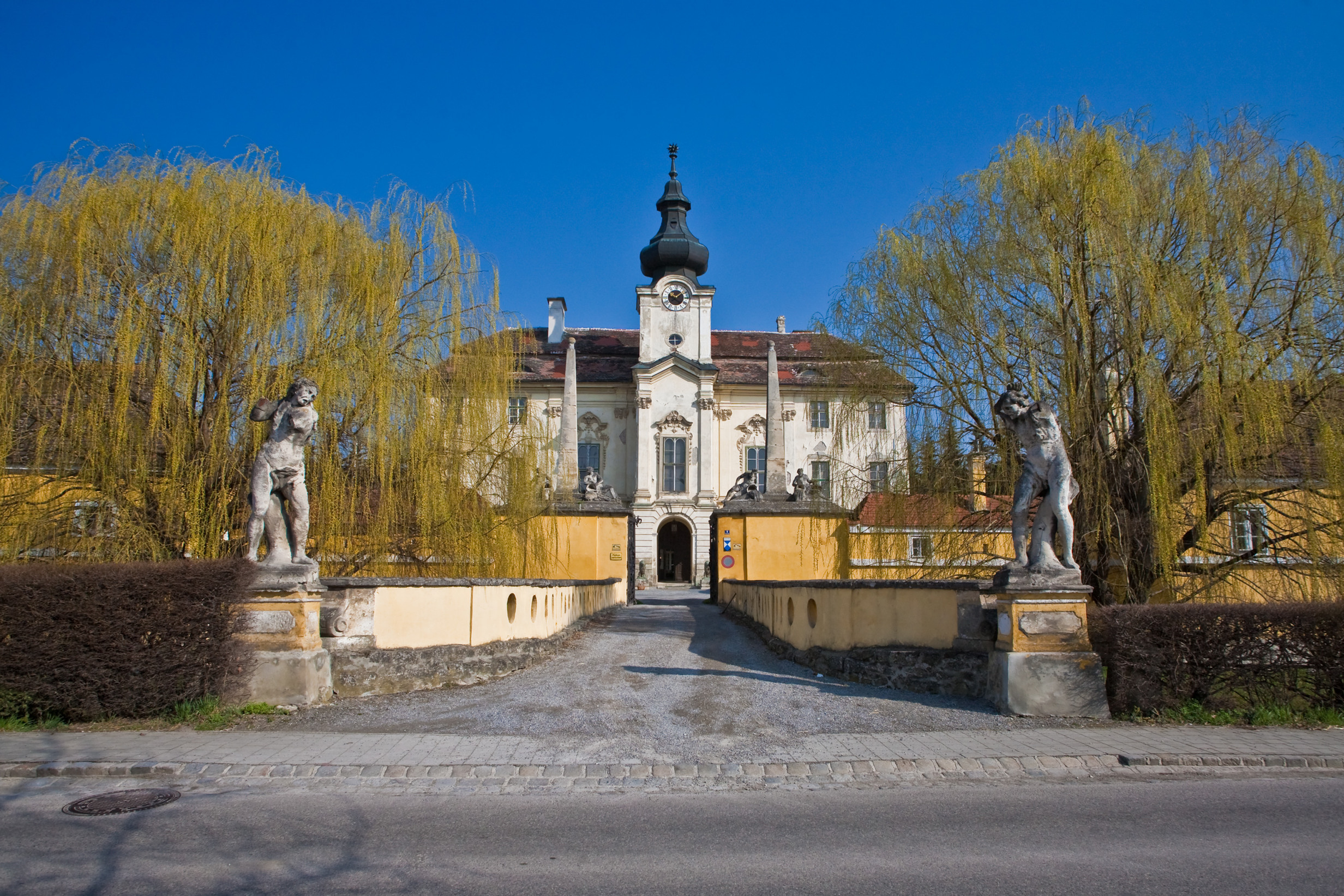
- Seibersdorf Castle

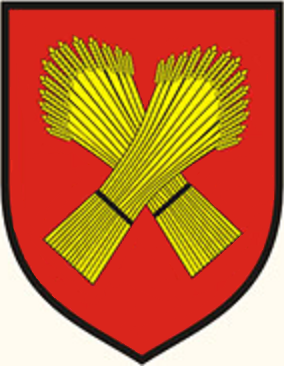
- Coat of arms

- Location within Austria Location within Lower Austria
- Coordinates: 47°56′N 16°31′E
- Country: Austria
- State: Lower Austria
- District: Baden

Government
  - Mayor: Paul Renner

Area
  - Total: 20.2 km^{2} (7.8 sq mi)
- Elevation: 186 m (610 ft)

Population (2018-01-01)
  - Total: 1,466
  - Density: 72.6/km^{2} (188/sq mi)
- Time zone: UTC+1 (CET)
  - Summer (DST): UTC+2 (CEST)
- Postal code: 2444
- Area code: 02255
- Website: www.marktgemeinde-seibersdorf.at

Seibersdorf is an Austrian market town with 1,283 residents in the District of Baden in Lower Austria.

== Geography ==
Seibersdorf lies in the industrial belt of Lower Austria. The municipality has an area of 20.2 km^{2}, 9.36 percent of which is forested.

Seibersdorf contains the following districts: Deutsch-Brodersdorf, Seibersdorf.

== History ==
In antiquity, the area was part of the Roman province of Pannonia. Located in the Austrian heartland, Lower Austria played a key part in much of Austrian history.

== Population ==
Historical population
Year	Pop.	±%
1971	895	—
1981	1,019	+13.9%
1991	1,176	+15.4%
2001	1,283	+9.1%
2011	1,388	+8.2%

== Infrastructure ==
Seibersdorf is best known as the site of Austrian Research Centers, now called the Austrian Institute of Technology (AIT). The International Atomic Energy Agency also operates laboratories within the same premises.

== See also ==
- Leithaprodersdorf
