= Wulkaprodersdorf =

- Municipality
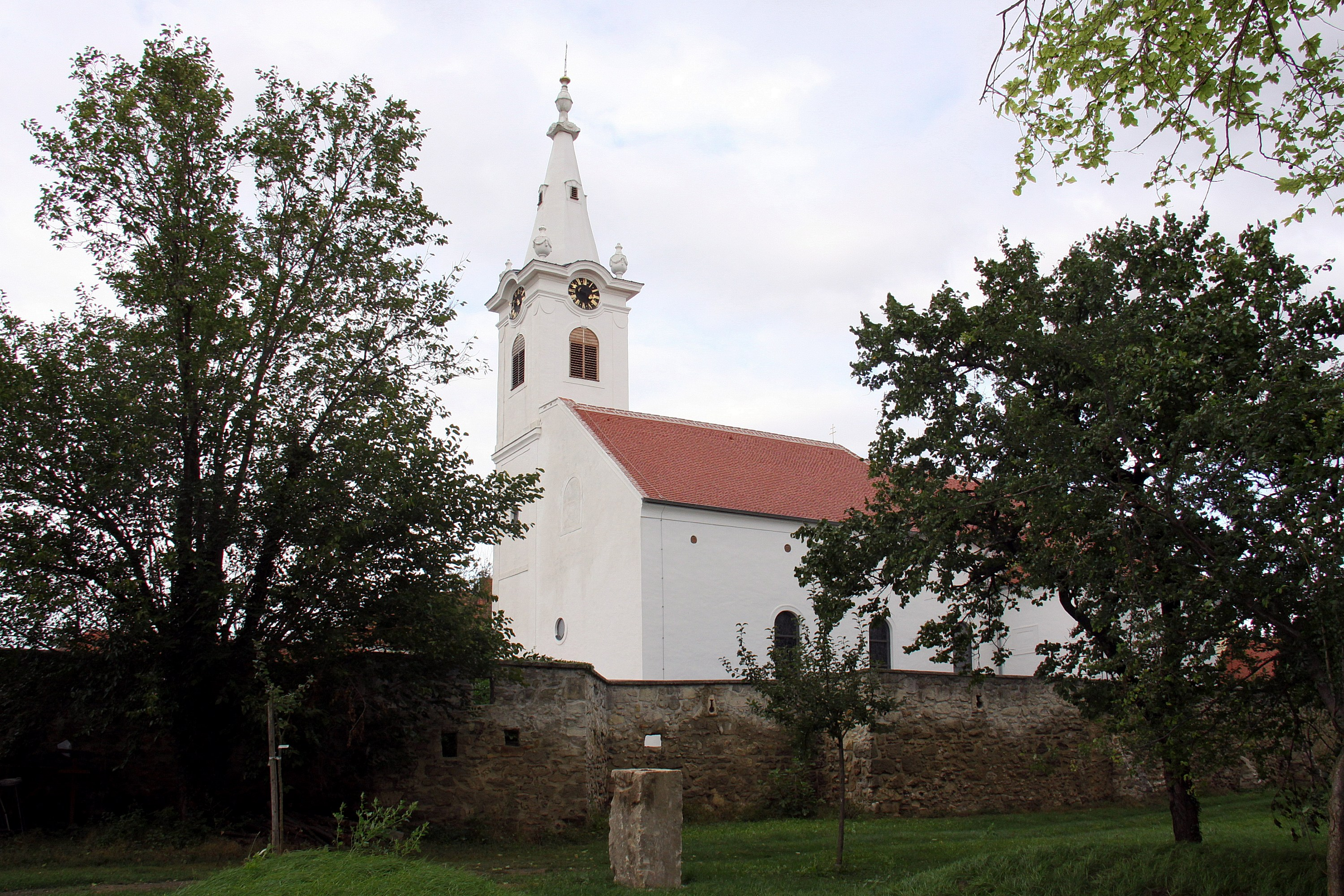
- Church of the Exaltation of the Holy Cross

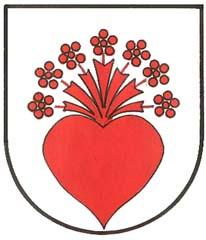
- Coat of arms

- Location within Burgenland Location within Austria
- Coordinates: 47°47′38″N 16°29′45″E
- Country: Austria
- State: Burgenland
- District: Eisenstadt-Umgebung

Government
  - Mayor: Friedrich Zarits (ÖVP)

Area
  - Total: 12.22 km^{2} (4.72 sq mi)
- Elevation: 171 m (561 ft)

Population (2018-01-01)
  - Total: 1,944
  - Density: 159.1/km^{2} (412.0/sq mi)
- Time zone: UTC+1 (CET)
  - Summer (DST): UTC+2 (CEST)
- Postal code: 7041
- Website: www.wulkaprodersdorf.at

Wulkaprodersdorf (Croatian: Vulkaprodrštof, Hungarian: Vulkapordány, Vulka-Pordány) is a town in the district of Eisenstadt-Umgebung in the Austrian state of Burgenland.

== Population ==
Historical population
Year	Pop.	±%
1869	1,343	—
1880	1,573	+17.1%
1890	1,630	+3.6%
1900	1,749	+7.3%
1910	1,761	+0.7%
1923	1,791	+1.7%
1934	1,806	+0.8%
1939	1,715	−5.0%
1951	1,764	+2.9%
1961	1,752	−0.7%
1971	1,682	−4.0%
1981	1,666	−1.0%
1991	1,865	+11.9%
2001	1,890	+1.3%
2011	1,883	−0.4%
2021	1,982	+5.3%

== Transport ==
The Pannonia Railway had a station in the community.

== See also ==
- Wulka
- Leithaprodersdorf
