= Müllendorf =

- Municipality
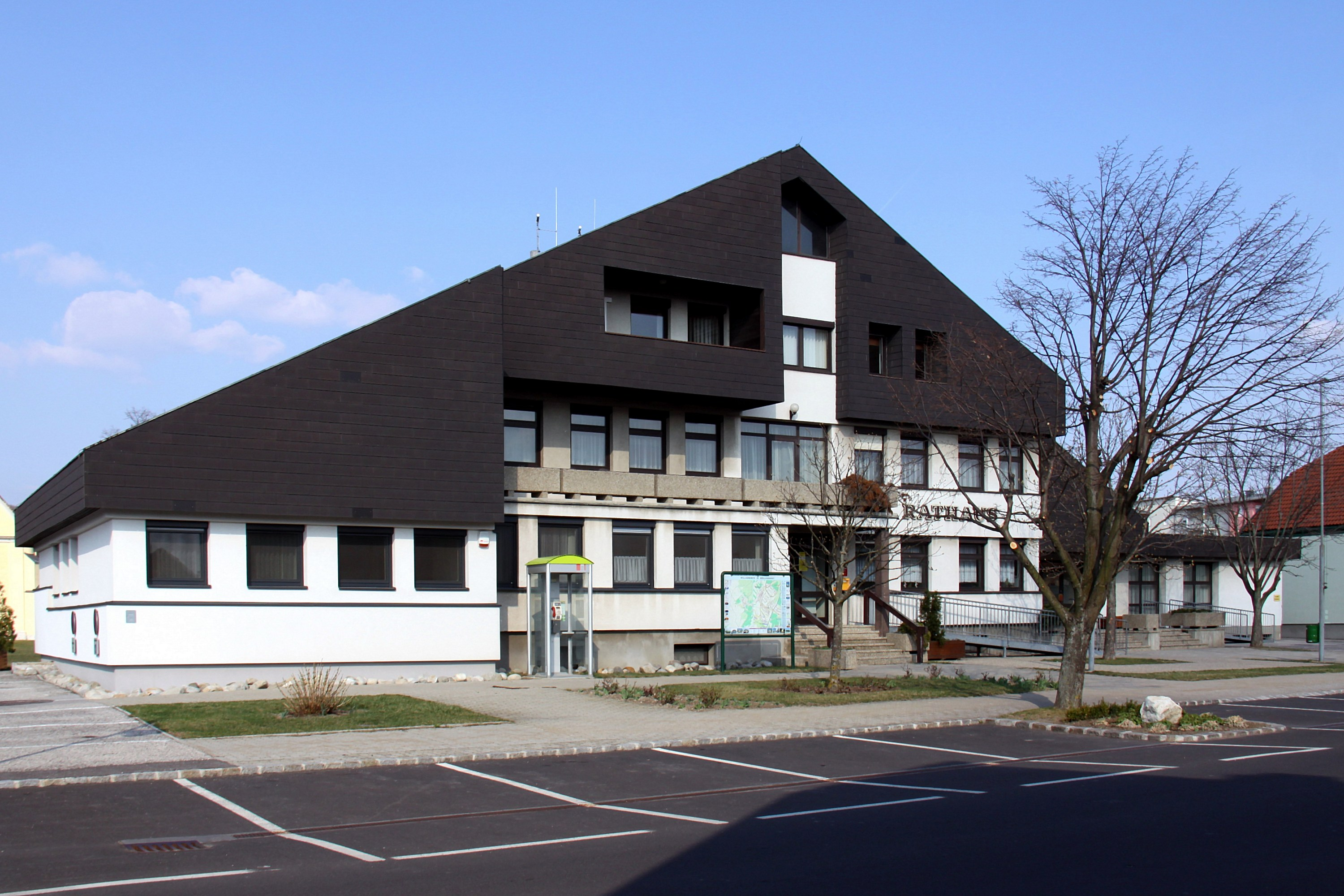
- Municipal office

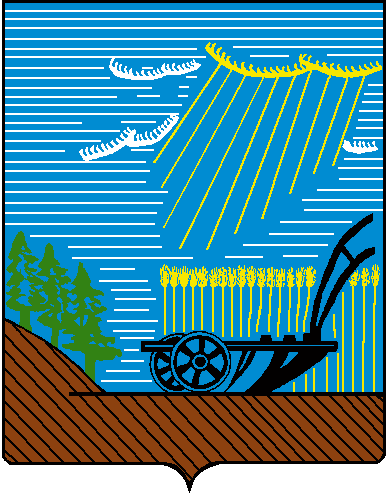
- Coat of arms

- Location within Austria
- Coordinates: 47°50′N 16°27′E
- Country: Austria
- State: Burgenland
- District: Eisenstadt-Umgebung

Government
  - Mayor: Werner Huf (SPÖ)

Area
  - Total: 12.8 km^{2} (4.9 sq mi)
- Elevation: 232 m (761 ft)

Population (2022-01-01)
  - Total: 1,400
  - Density: 110/km^{2} (280/sq mi)
- Time zone: UTC+1 (CET)
  - Summer (DST): UTC+2 (CEST)
- Postal code: 7052
- Area code: 02682 (Ortsnetz Eisenstadt)
- Website: www.muellendorf.at

Müllendorf (Austrian German pronunciation: [ˈmʏləndɔrf]; Hungarian: Szárazvám) is a town in the district of Eisenstadt-Umgebung in the Austrian state of Burgenland.

== Population ==
Historical population
Year	Pop.	±%
1869	956	—
1880	1,107	+15.8%
1890	1,043	−5.8%
1900	1,090	+4.5%
1910	1,063	−2.5%
1923	1,062	−0.1%
1934	1,106	+4.1%
1939	1,097	−0.8%
1951	1,027	−6.4%
1961	1,017	−1.0%
1971	1,072	+5.4%
1981	1,173	+9.4%
1991	1,224	+4.3%
2001	1,229	+0.4%
2011	1,353	+10.1%
2021	1,384	+2.3%
