= Steinbrunn =

- Municipality
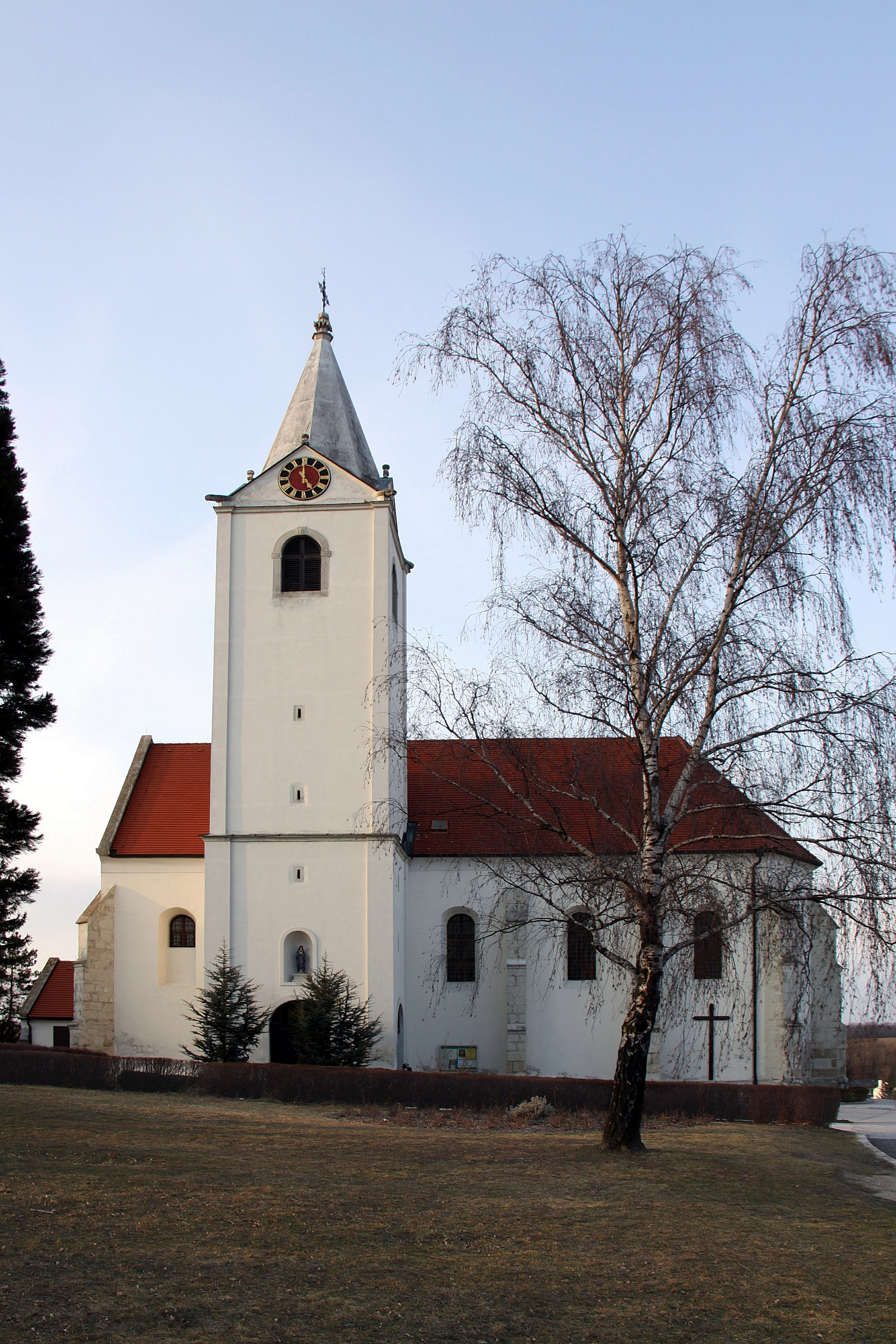
- Parish church „Zum heiligen Kreuz”

- Coat of arms

- Location within Austria Steinbrunn (Austria)
- Coordinates: 47°50′09″N 16°24′47″E
- Country: Austria
- State: Burgenland
- District: Eisenstadt-Umgebung

Government
  - Mayor: Thomas Kittelmann (ÖVP)

Area
  - Total: 15.36 km^{2} (5.93 sq mi)
- Elevation: 241 m (791 ft)

Population (2018-01-01)
  - Total: 2,614
  - Density: 170.2/km^{2} (440.8/sq mi)
- Time zone: UTC+1 (CET)
  - Summer (DST): UTC+2 (CEST)
- Postal code: 7035

Steinbrunn (till 1958: Stinkenbrunn, Hungarian: Büdöskút, Croatian: Štikapron) is a town in the district of Eisenstadt-Umgebung in the Austrian state of Burgenland.

== Population ==
Historical population
Year	Pop.	±%
1869	1,516	—
1880	1,581	+4.3%
1890	1,799	+13.8%
1900	1,779	−1.1%
1910	1,399	−21.4%
1923	1,608	+14.9%
1934	1,508	−6.2%
1939	1,347	−10.7%
1951	1,306	−3.0%
1961	1,272	−2.6%
1971	1,298	+2.0%
1981	1,388	+6.9%
1991	1,584	+14.1%
2001	1,902	+20.1%
2011	2,320	+22.0%
2021	2,932	+26.4%
