= Jürgen Mansberger =

Austrian footballer

Personal information
- Full name: Jürgen Mansberger
- Date of birth: January 13, 1988 (age 38)
- Place of birth: Austria
- Height: 1.89 m (6 ft 2 1/2 in)
- Position: Left back

Senior career*
Years	Team	Apps	(Gls)
2006–2011	Mattersburg	19	(0)
- * Club domestic league appearances and goals as of 30 May 2010

Jürgen Mansberger (born January 13, 1988) is an Austrian former professional association football player.
