= Fertő-Hanság National Park =

National park of Hungary

Coordinates: 47.75°N 16.75°E

- Interactive map of Fertő-Hanság National Park
- Area: 235.88 km^{2} (91.07 sq mi)

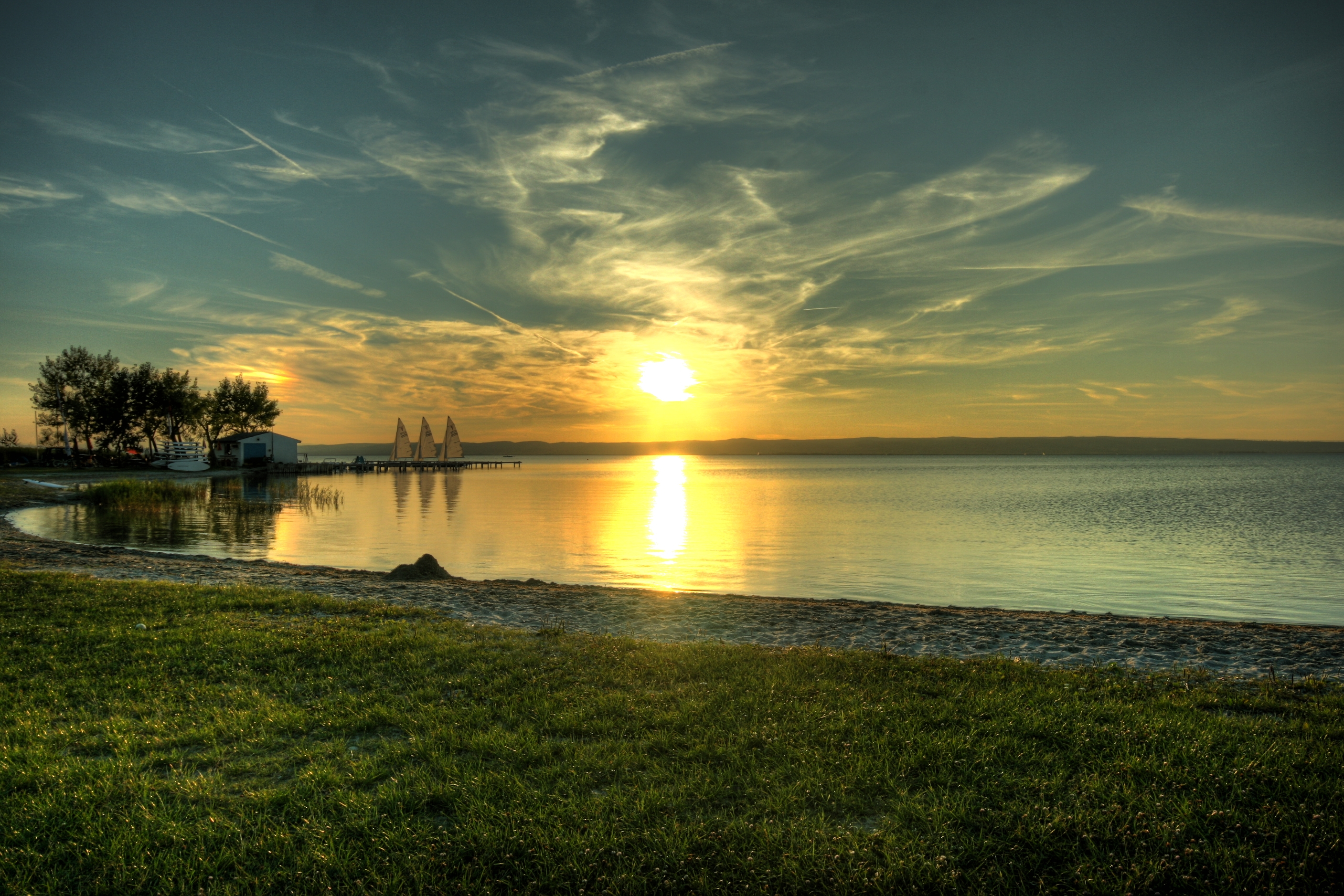
Lake Fertő

Fertő-Hanság National Park (Hungarian: Fertő-Hanság Nemzeti Park) is a national Park in North-West Hungary in Győr-Moson-Sopron county. It was created in 1991, and officially opened together with the connecting Austrian Neusiedler See-Seewinkel National Park the same year (both parks are attached to Lake Neusiedl/Lake Fertő). The park covers 235.88 km^{2}, and consists of two main areas.

Lake Fertő is the third largest lake in Central-Europe, and the westernmost of the great continental salt lakes of Eurasia. Because of the shallow level of water and the prevailing wind, the size and shape of the lake changes very often. The area gives home to various kinds of birds, like the great egret, purple heron, common spoonbill and greylag goose. During the migration season species of the family Scolopacidae appear. Rare birds include red-breasted goose, white-tailed eagle and hen harrier. The lake is inhabited by weatherfish, northern pike and ziege. On the meadows west from the lake vegetation of rare plants like the yellow lady's slipper, fly orchid, the Hungarian iris and Iris pumila and various butterfly species can be found, while the eastern puszta areas are covered by Puccinellia peisonis, Aster tripolium, A. pannonicum and Suaeda maritima.

== See also ==
- National Park Neusiedler See-Seewinkel
- Hanság (German: Waasen, Wasen)
- Seewinkel (Hungarian: Fertőzug)
- Földsziget
- Tóköz
- List of national parks of Hungary
