= Apetlon =

- Municipality
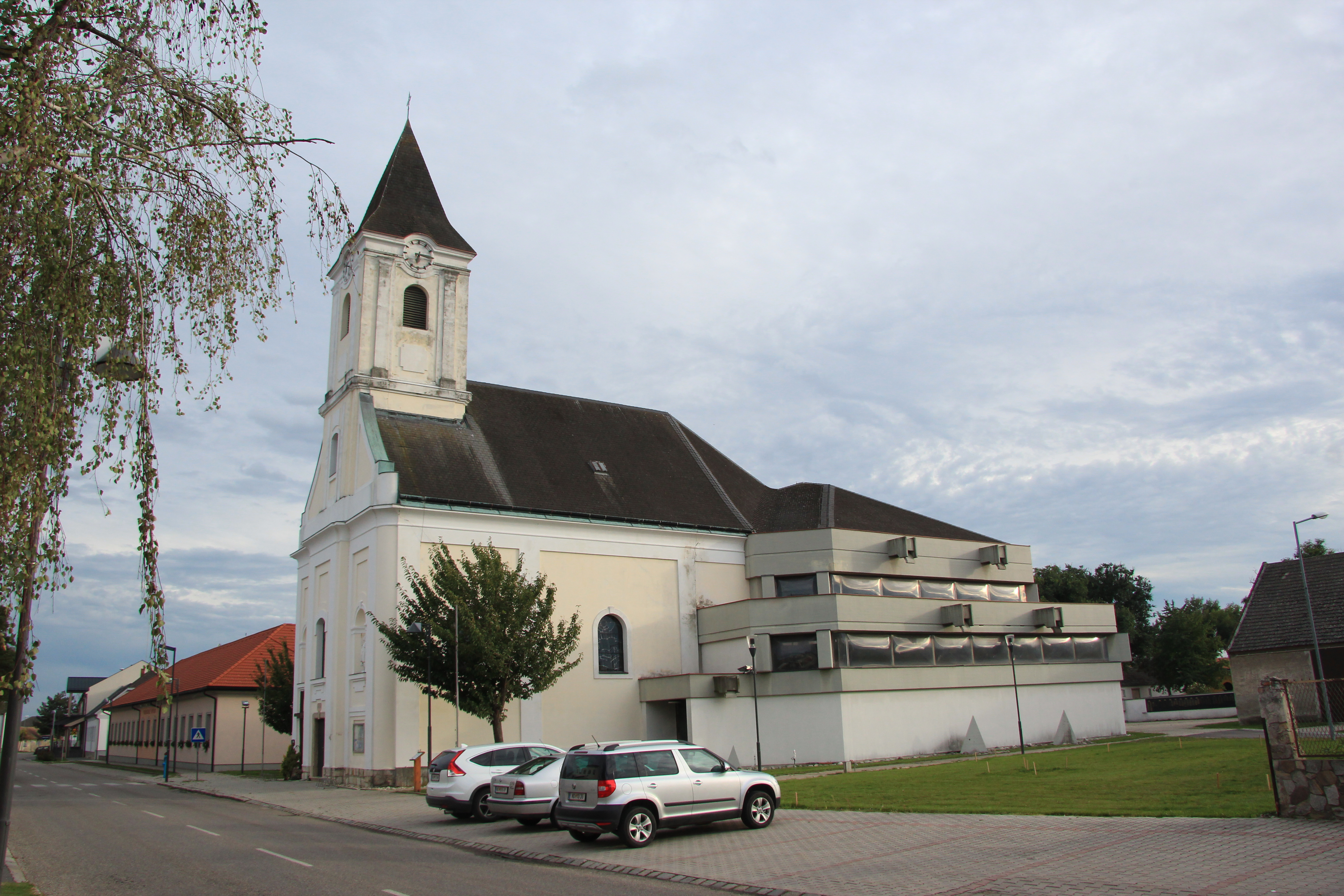
- Saint Margaret Church

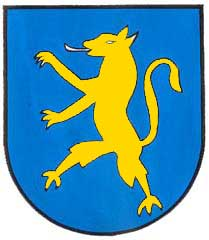
- Coat of arms

- Location within Austria
- Coordinates: 47°45′N 16°50′E
- Country: Austria
- State: Burgenland
- District: Neusiedl am See

Government
  - Mayor: Ronald Payer (ÖVP)

Area
  - Total: 82.21 km^{2} (31.74 sq mi)

Population (2018-01-01)
  - Total: 1,760
  - Density: 21.4/km^{2} (55.4/sq mi)
- Time zone: UTC+1 (CET)
  - Summer (DST): UTC+2 (CEST)
- Postal code: 7143
- Website: www.gemeinde-apetlon.at/

Apetlon (German pronunciation: [ˈapɛtlon], Hungarian: Mosonbánfalva) is a market town in the district of Neusiedl am See in Burgenland in Austria. It is located in a region to the east of Lake Neusiedl (German: Neusiedler See; Hungarian: Fertő tó) which is named the Seewinkel (lake corner).

== Geography ==
Apetlon is in the National Park Neusiedler See-Seewinkel on the eastern shore of Lake Neusiedl. The town itself is 120 m above sea level, but part of the municipality is 114 m above sea level, the lowest point in Austria. Characteristic of the area are wide open plains and salt marsh flora, with many small salt lakes around. The Lange Lacke (Long Lake) is the largest of about forty such lakes nearby.

== History ==
The community was first mentioned in records in 1318. In 1867, the Austrian Empire was dissolved, and Austria-Hungary was formed, with separate governments in Vienna and Budapest. Since 1898, due to the Pro-Magyar politics in Budapest, the Hungarian village name Bánfalu was used.

After the First World War, Burgenland was named Westungarn (West Hungary) in the 1919 Treaty of St. Germain and the Treaty of Trianon and was awarded to Austria in 1919. Since 1921, the town has been part of the newly founded State of Burgenland. Apetlon has been a market town since 1991. In December 2001, the National Park Neusiedlersee was named a UNESCO World Heritage Site.

== Economy and infrastructure ==
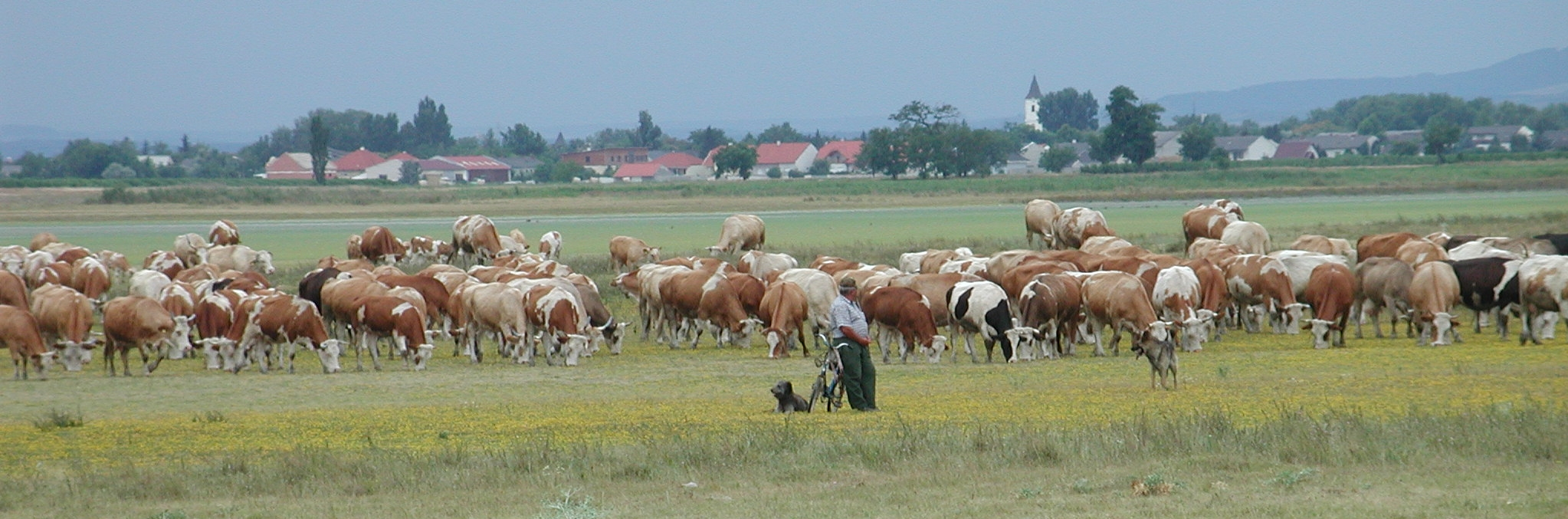

In Apetlon the primary business is wine production. The town is surrounded by vineyards. Tourism is also significant. Every year in May, many come from all over Europe to watch birds. Long before the establishment of the National Park, the Lange Lacke (Long Lake) already was an important nature reserve. The Lange Lacke is the largest of about forty salt lakes near the town. Scientific records about the bird life of the area have been collected for over a century.

Wine producers can come into conflict with the birdlife in the area, with the population of common starlings sometimes causing issues for farmers.

== Language ==
Apetlonerisch is a German dialect with borrowings from Hungarian.
