= Mörbisch am See =

- Municipality
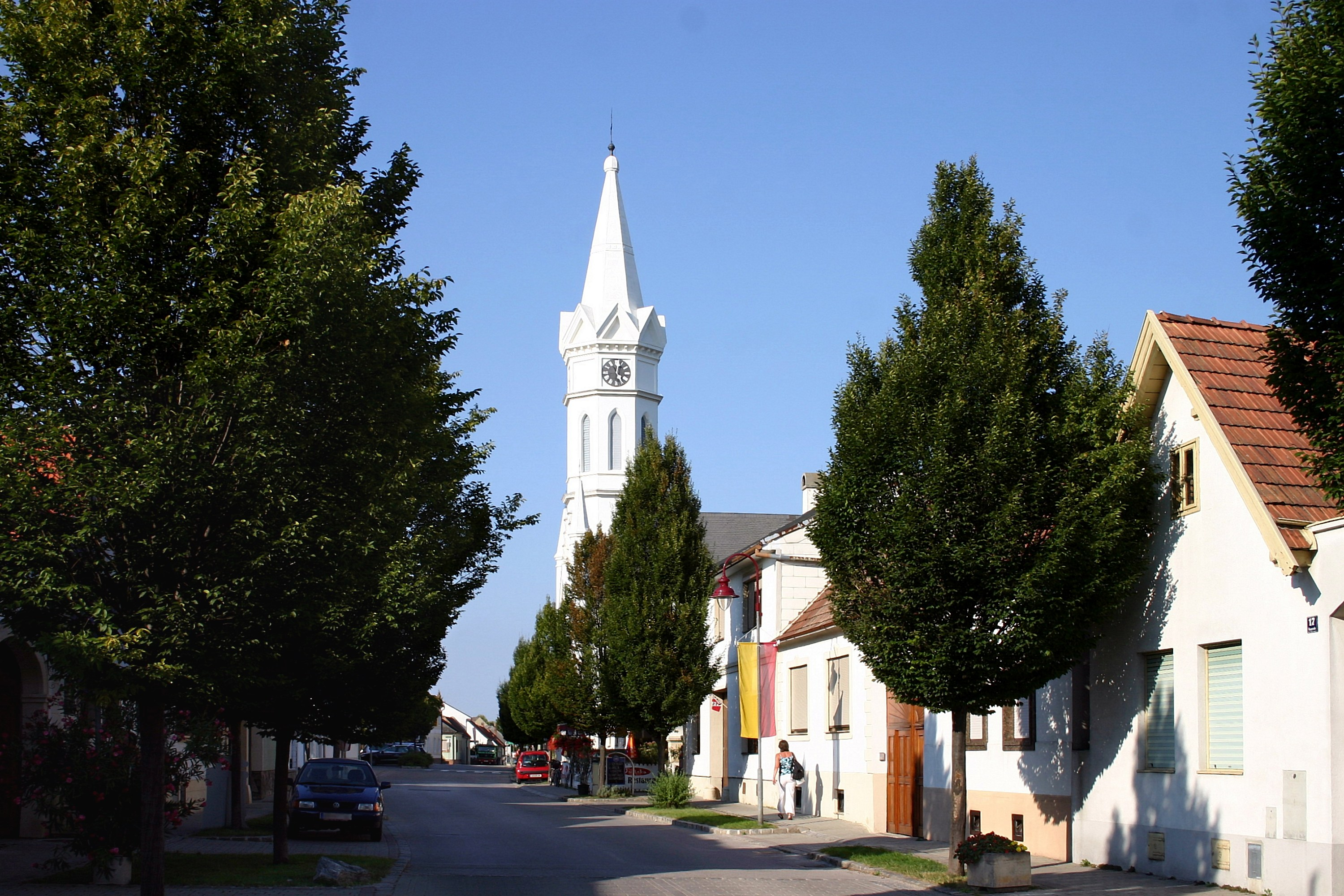
- Main street in Mörbisch am See

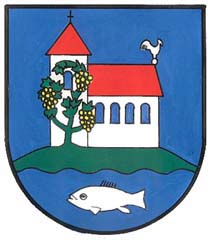
- Coat of arms

- Location within Austria Mörbisch am See (Austria)
- Coordinates: 47°45′N 16°40′E
- Country: Austria
- State: Burgenland
- District: Eisenstadt-Umgebung

Government
  - Mayor: Bettina Zentgraf (SPÖ)

Area
  - Total: 2,805 km^{2} (1,083 sq mi)
- Elevation: 122 m (400 ft)

Population (2024)
  - Total: 2,213
  - Density: 0.7889/km^{2} (2.043/sq mi)
- Time zone: UTC+1 (CET)
  - Summer (DST): UTC+2 (CEST)
- Postal code: 7072
- Area code: 02685
- Website: www.moerbisch.com

Mörbisch am See (Croatian: Merbiš, Hungarian: Fertőmeggyes) is an Austrian town on the shore of Lake Neusiedl in the state of Burgenland.

== Geography ==
Mörbisch am See is located in northern Burgenland on the south-western shore of Lake Neusiedl, just north of the national border with Hungary and the town of Fertőrákos. The town is connected via the B52, which leads through Rust and Sankt Margarethen to Eisenstadt. It is 70 km south-east of Vienna and 10 km north-east of Sopron, Hungary.

== History ==
Mörbisch has been inhabited since around 5000 BC. The name Mörbisch was first recorded in 1254 as possessio Megyes (literally "the cherry-rich place," from Hungarian meggy, meaning "cherry"). The original Hungarian-speaking settlers likely named the village after a prominent cherry tree or an abundance of cherry trees in the area. The name later evolved into the German Mörbisch and the Croatian Merbiš, the latter borrowed from German.

The area was part of the Celtic Kingdom of Noricum. To the west of the town, in the area known as Salzäcker, a La Tène-period burial ground was discovered in 1935. Excavations revealed several graves containing early La Tène artifacts, including bronze fibulae (some shaped like bird heads), neck rings with hook-and-eye closures, iron swords and knives, and a hollow-bossed ring indicating use into the Middle La Tène period.

Under Roman rule, the area became part of the province of Pannonia. South of the Hungarian border, a Mithras relief from the Roman era can still be seen.

Until 1921, the town belonged to Hungary, specifically to Sopron County. Following World War I and the treaties of St. Germain (1919) and Trianon (1920), the area was awarded to Austria. Mörbisch became part of the newly founded state of Burgenland in 1921, though during the Nazi era it was incorporated into Lower Austria. Despite the political shift, economic and cultural ties to Sopron remained strong until 1945.

From 1945 to 1989, the Iron Curtain divided Mörbisch and Sopron. Since then, the border has reopened, and in late 2007, border controls were abolished following Hungary's entry into the Schengen Area.

== Features ==
The town hosts the annual Seefestspiele Mörbisch, an open-air festival held on a floating stage on Lake Neusiedl. While traditionally focused on operetta, the program has expanded to include musicals such as The King and I, Mamma Mia!, and West Side Story, often translated into German.

== Politics ==
The mayor of Mörbisch am See is Bettina Zentgraf of the Social Democratic Party (SPÖ). The municipal council consists of 23 seats. In the 2022 Burgenland local elections, the SPÖ won 12 seats with 49.57% of the vote, securing a narrow majority. The Austrian People's Party (ÖVP) obtained 9 seats, while the Greens and the Freedom Party of Austria (FPÖ) won one seat each.

== Gallery ==
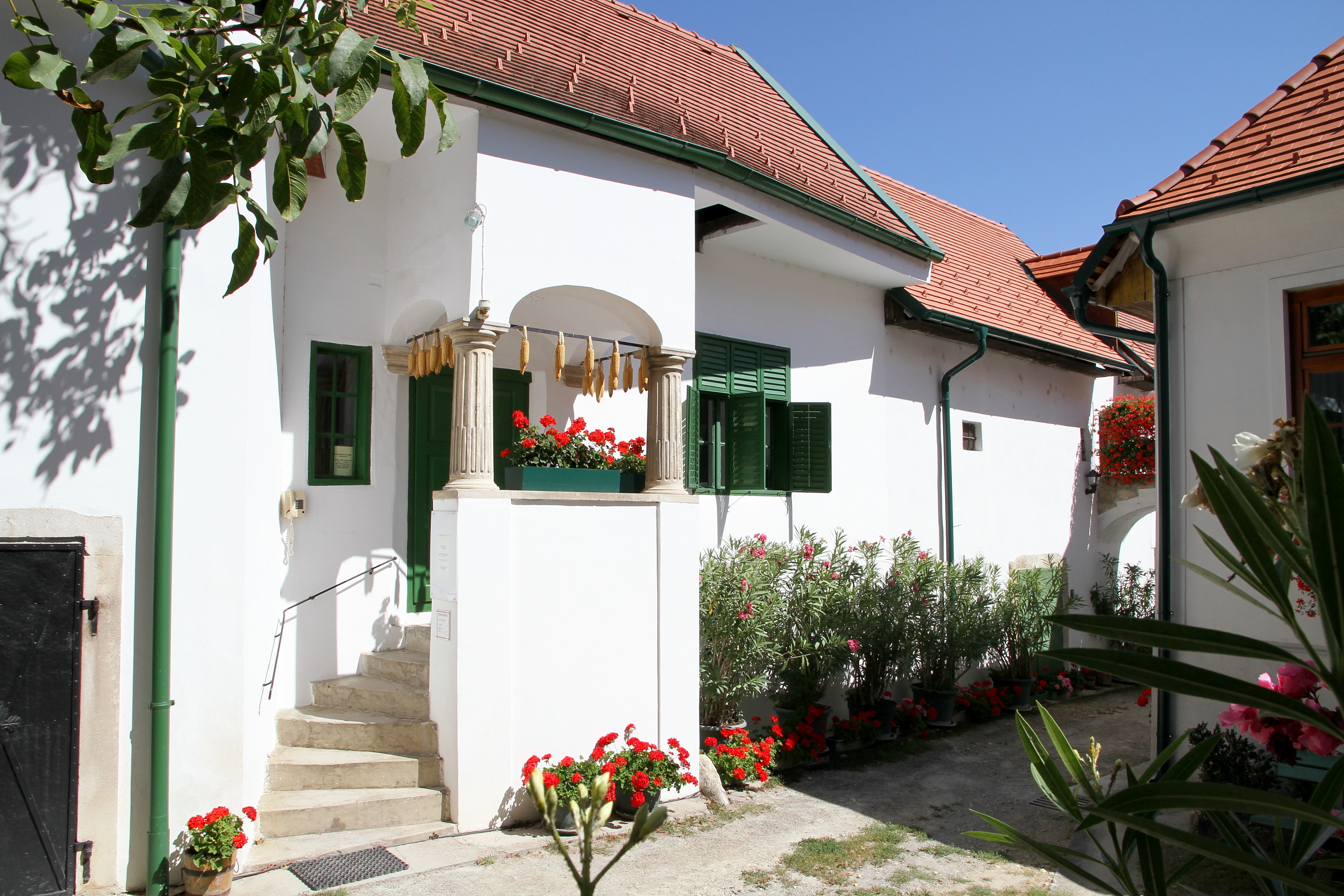
A house in Mörbisch

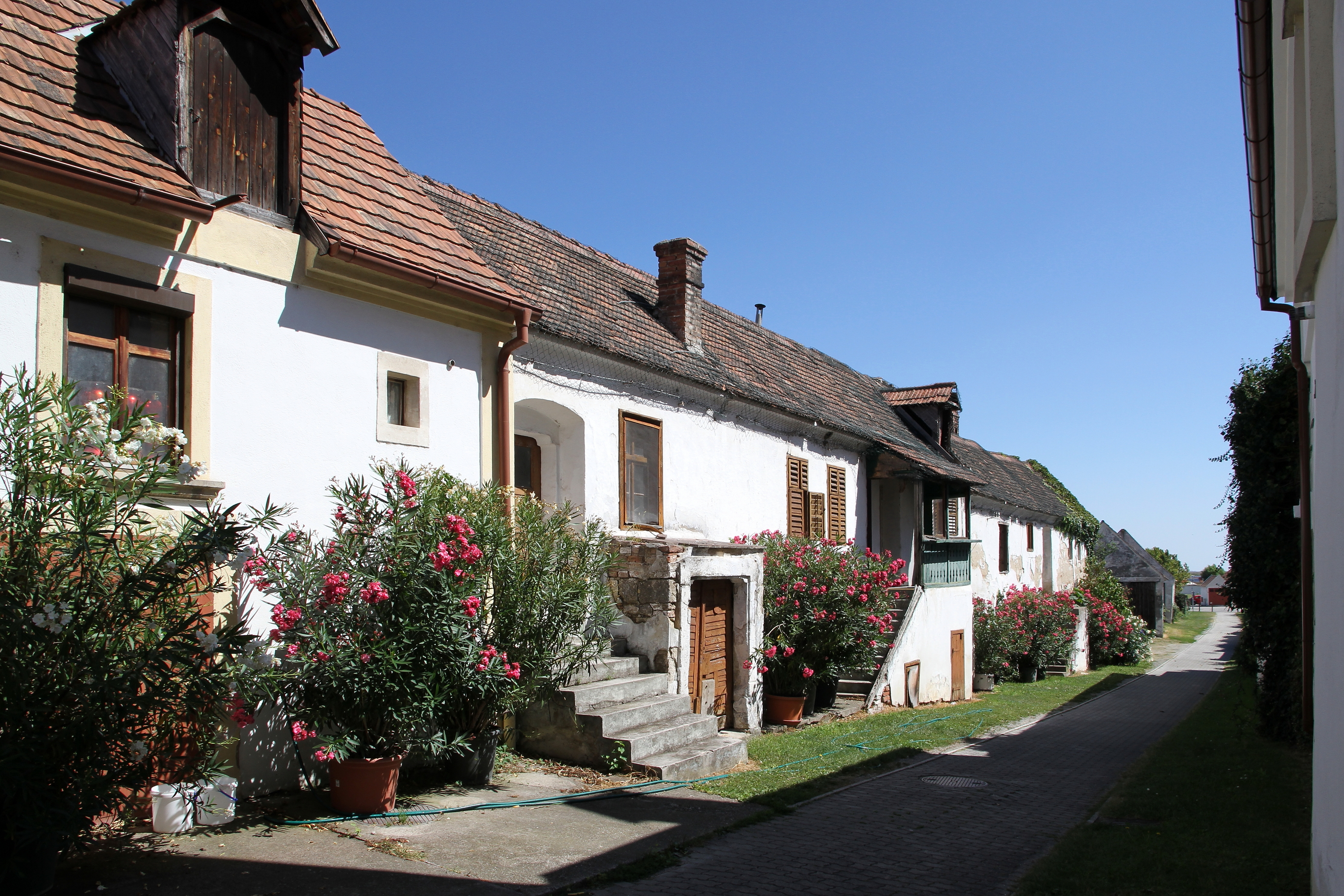
Typical courtyard alley with barns at the end

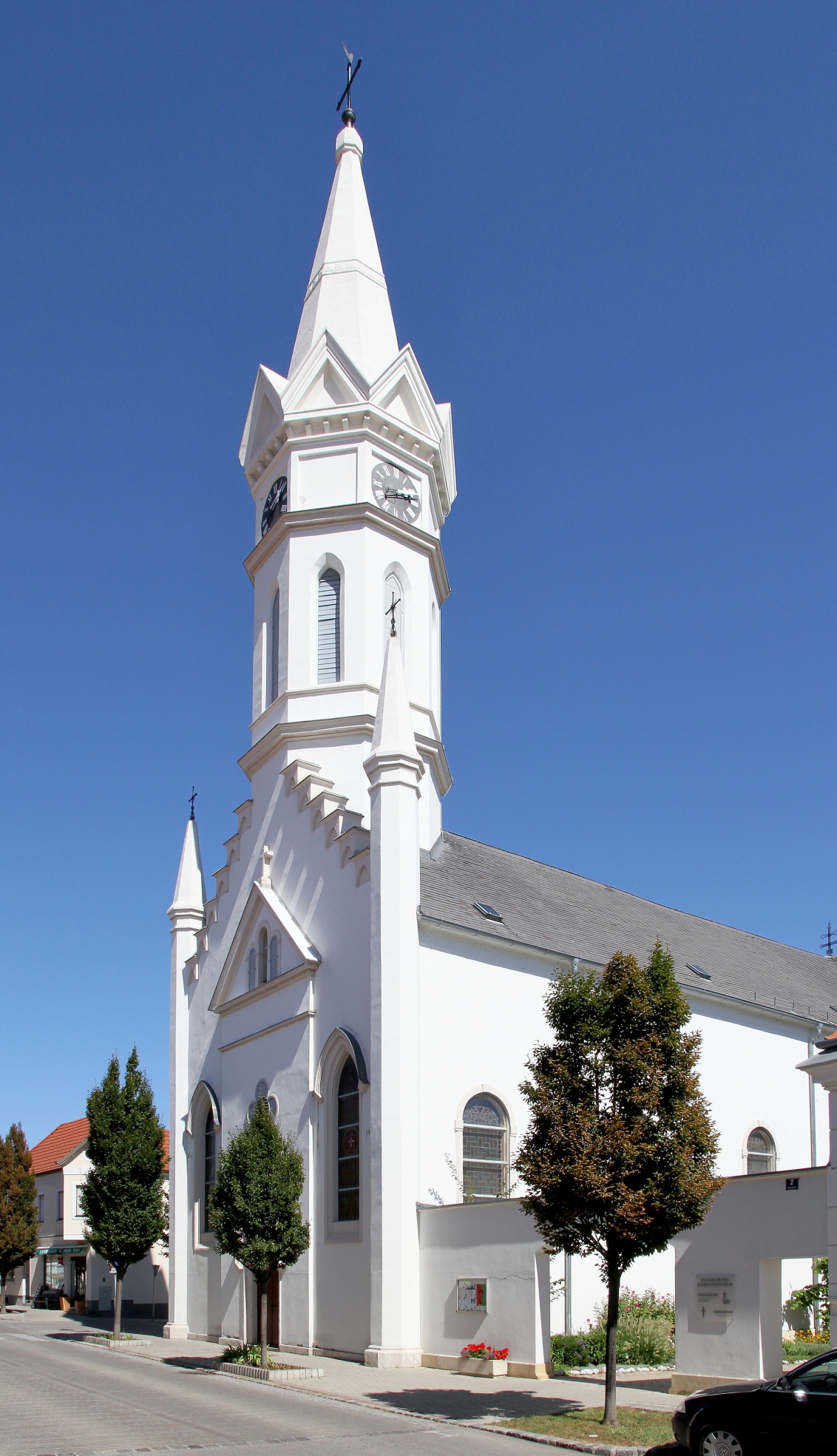
Catholic church

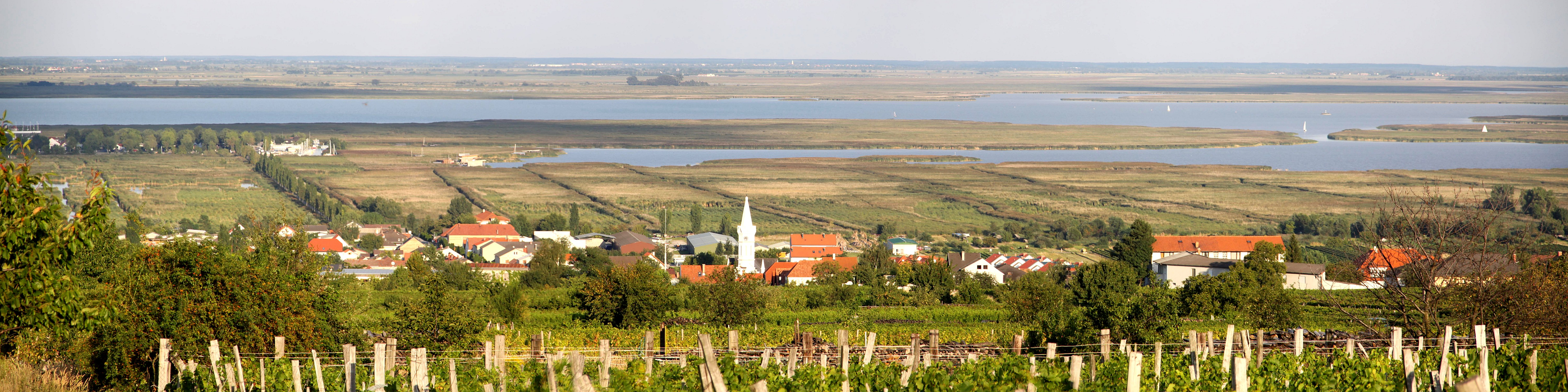
Panorama of the Neusiedl See

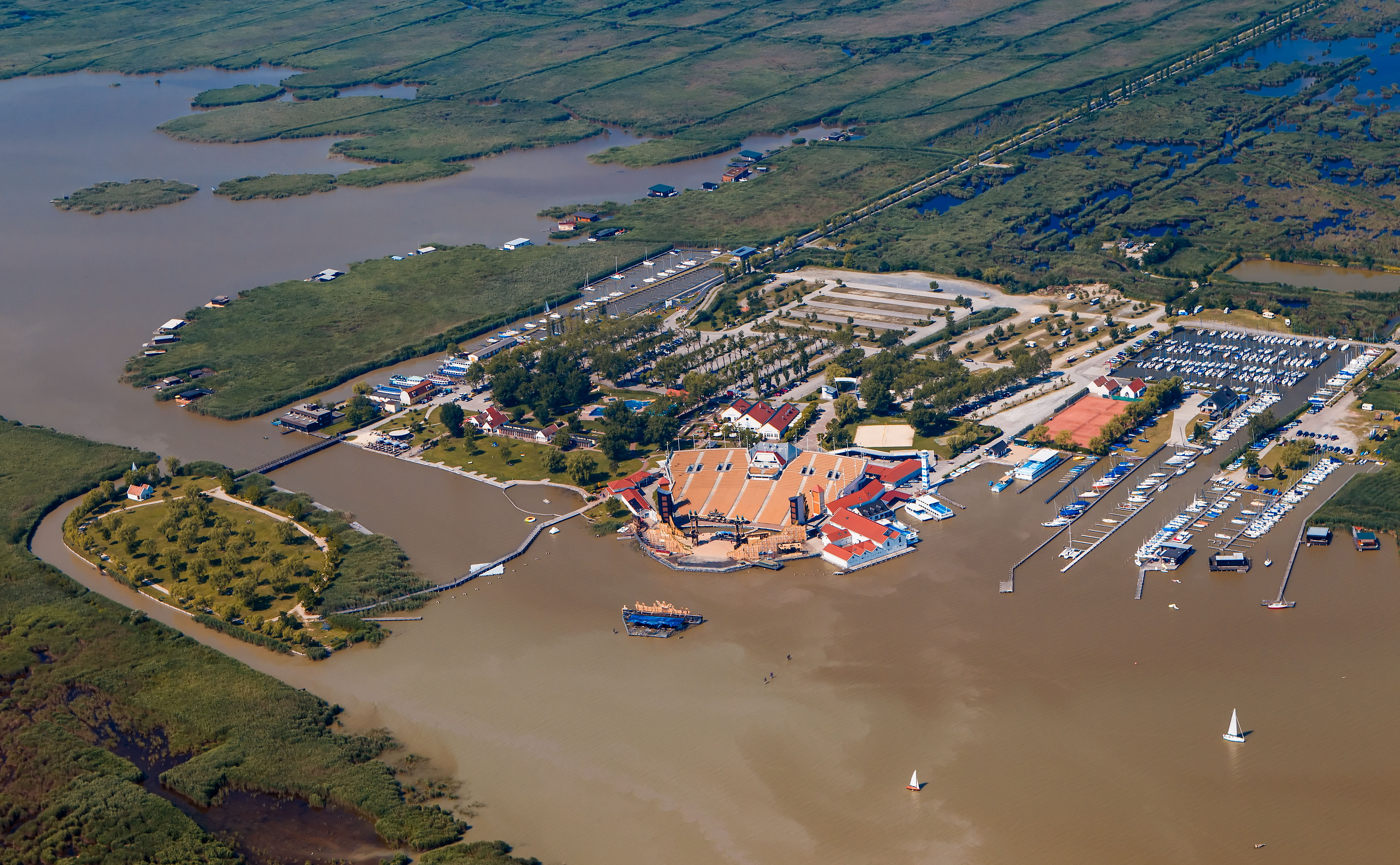
Seefestspiele

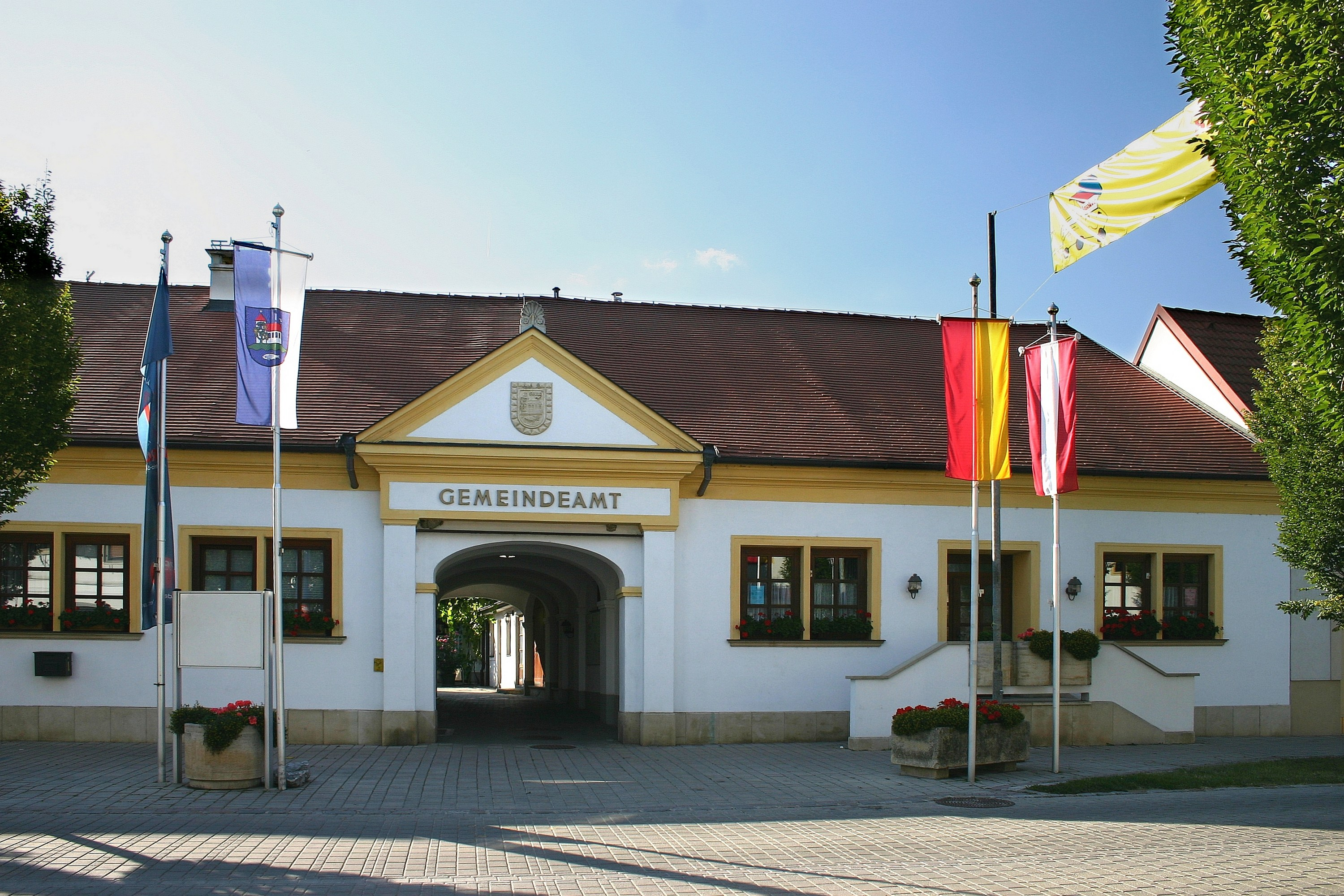
Municipal office of Mörbisch

== Population ==
Historical population
Year	Pop.	±%
1869	1,004	—
1880	1,187	+18.2%
1890	1,405	+18.4%
1900	1,661	+18.2%
1910	1,833	+10.4%
1923	1,974	+7.7%
1934	2,129	+7.9%
1939	2,127	−0.1%
1951	2,258	+6.2%
1961	2,333	+3.3%
1971	2,302	−1.3%
1981	2,359	+2.5%
1991	2,279	−3.4%
2001	2,323	+1.9%
2011	2,325	+0.1%
2021	2,228	−4.2%
