= Fertőrákos =

Fertőrákos Kroisbach
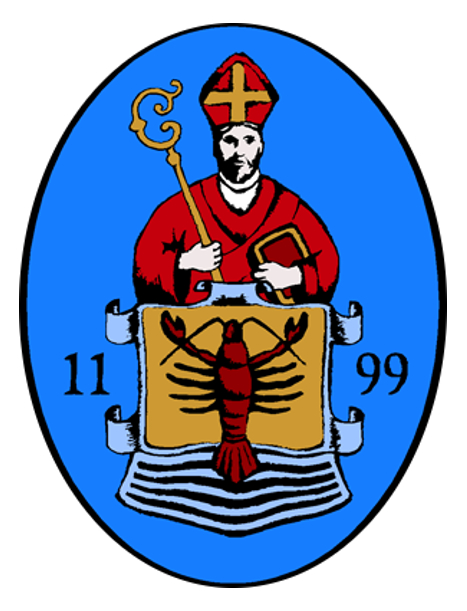
- Coat of arms

- Location of Fertőrákos
- Coordinates: 47.72017°N 16.65197°E
- Country: Hungary
- County: Győr-Moson-Sopron

Area
  - Total: 21.89 km^{2} (8.45 sq mi)

Population (2025)
  - Total: 2,473
  - Density: 99.68/km^{2} (258.2/sq mi)
- Time zone: UTC+1 (CET)
  - Summer (DST): UTC+2 (CEST)
- Postal code: 9421
- Area code: 99

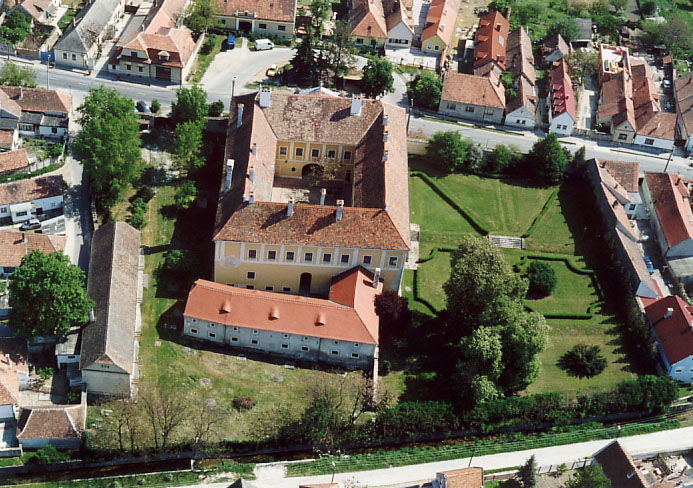
Fertőrákos - Palace from above

Fertőrákos (German: Kroisbach) is a village in the county of Győr-Moson-Sopron in Hungary. In 2025 it had a population of 2,473.

It is located at 47°43′15″N 16°39′0″E, about 10 km (6 mi) from Sopron, near Lake Fertő (German: Neusiedler See) and the Austrian border. In summer, a border checkpoint for pedestrians and cyclists connects it to the Austrian municipality of Mörbisch am See (Hungarian: Meggyes). The Fertorakos mithraeum is visible near the border. Fertőrákos also features a small port with a border checkpoint, and a sand beach swimming area, access to which prior to 1989 was restricted to the communist elite.

The village was first mentioned in 1199 under the name Racus. In 1457 it was first mentioned in German language as Krewspach, later Kroisbach. Today, it forms part of the Austrian-Hungarian national park and joint World Heritage Site of Lake Fertő.

Following World War I, the village took part in a plebiscite in 1921 along with eight surrounding settlements, asking whether they wished to remain in Hungary, or to join the new Austrian Republic. Although the village voted 60.7% in favour of joining Austria, the majority of voters overall (mostly those in Sopron) voted 65.1% in favour of remaining in Hungary.

Following the occupation of Hungary in 1944, the new extremist pro-nazi regime established a 'transit/labour camp' in a quarry in Fertőrákos, to which Hungarian Jewish and political prisoners were sent, and many thousands died here, with others transported onward to Nazi concentration camps in German-occupied Poland and Germany. The site of the transit camp can be visited, and has a memorial plaque.
