= Maximilian Köllner =

Austrian politician (born 1991)

Member of the National Council
- Incumbent
- Assumed office 23 October 2019
- Constituency: Burgenland North

Personal details
- Born: 25 August 1991 (age 34)
- Party: Social Democratic Party

Maximilian Köllner (born 25 August 1991) is an Austrian politician of the Social Democratic Party. Since 2019, he has been a member of the National Council. In 2022, he was elected mayor of Illmitz.
