= Burgenland North (National Council electoral district) =

Parliamentary electoral district in Austria

- Burgenland Nord; Gradišće sjeverno
- Electoral District for the National Council
- Location of Burgenland North within Austria
- District: List: Eisenstadt City; Greater Eisenstadt; Mattersburg; Neusiedl am See; Rust City
- State: Burgenland
- Population: 165,658 (2024)
- Electorate: 123,715 (2019)
- Area: 1,792 km^{2} (2023)

Current Electoral District
- Created: 1994
- Seats: List: 4 (2002–present); 3 (1994–2002)
- Members: List: Maximilian Köllner (SPÖ); Christoph Zarits (ÖVP)

Burgenland North (German: Burgenland Nord; Croatian: Gradišće sjeverno), also known as Electoral District 1A (German: Wahlkreis 1A), is one of the 39 multi-member regional electoral districts of the National Council, the lower house of the Austrian Parliament, the national legislature of Austria. The electoral district was created in 1992 when electoral regulations were amended to add regional electoral districts to the existing state-wide electoral districts and came into being at the following legislative election in 1994. It consists of the cities of Eisenstadt and Rust and the districts of Greater Eisenstadt, Mattersburg and Neusiedl am See in the state of Burgenland. The electoral district currently elects four of the 183 members of the National Council using the open party-list proportional representation electoral system. At the 2019 legislative election the constituency had 123,715 registered electors.

== History ==
Burgenland North was one 43 regional electoral districts (regionalwahlkreise) established by the "National Council Electoral Regulations 1992" (Nationalrats-Wahlordnung 1992) passed by the National Council in 1992. It consisted of the cities of Eisenstadt and Rust and the districts of Greater Eisenstadt, Mattersburg and Neusiedl am See in the state of Burgenland. The district was initially allocated three seats in May 1993. Electoral regulations require the allocation of seats amongst the electoral districts to be recalculated following each national census and in September 2002 the number of seats allocated to Burgenland North was increased to four based on the population as at the 2001 national census.

== Electoral system ==
Burgenland North currently elects four of the 183 members of the National Council using the open party-list proportional representation electoral system. The allocation of seats is carried out in three stages. In the first stage, seats are allocated to parties (lists) at the regional level using a state-wide Hare quota (wahlzahl) (valid votes in the state divided by the number of seats in the state). In the second stage, seats are allocated to parties at the state/provincial level using the state-wide Hare quota (any seats won by the party at the regional stage are subtracted from the party's state seats). In the third and final stage, seats are allocated to parties at the federal/national level using the D'Hondt method (any seats won by the party at the regional and state stages are subtracted from the party's federal seats). Only parties that reach the 4% national threshold, or have won a seat at the regional stage, compete for seats at the state and federal stages.

Electors may cast one preferential vote for individual candidates at the regional, state and federal levels. Split-ticket voting (panachage), or voting for more than one candidate at each level, is not permitted and will result in the ballot paper being invalidated. At the regional level, candidates must receive preferential votes amounting to at least 14% of the valid votes cast for their party to over-ride the order of the party list (10% and 7% respectively for the state and federal levels). Prior to April 2013 electors could not cast preferential votes at the federal level and the thresholds candidates needed to over-ride the party list order were higher at the regional level (half the Hare quota or 1/6 of the party votes) and state level (Hare quota).

== Election results ==
=== Summary ===
Election	Communists KPÖ+ / KPÖ			Social Democrats SPÖ			Greens GRÜNE			NEOS NEOS / LiF			People's ÖVP			Freedom FPÖ		
Election	Votes	%	Seats	Votes	%	Seats	Votes	%	Seats	Votes	%	Seats	Votes	%	Seats	Votes	%	Seats
2019	411	0.41%	0	28,872	29.08%	1	9,084	9.15%	0	5,590	5.63%	0	37,009	37.28%	1	16,466	16.59%	0
2017	428	0.42%	0	34,186	33.21%	1	2,266	2.20%	0	3,401	3.30%	0	33,221	32.27%	1	25,142	24.42%	0
2013	552	0.56%	0	36,185	36.97%	1	7,422	7.58%	0	3,332	3.40%	0	24,925	25.46%	0	17,418	17.79%	0
2008	412	0.41%	0	40,301	40.40%	1	6,265	6.28%	0	1,273	1.28%	0	27,358	27.42%	0	16,641	16.68%	0
2006	505	0.52%	0	43,930	45.64%	1	6,290	6.53%	0				32,896	34.18%	1	8,766	9.11%	0
2002	255	0.26%	0	45,270	46.82%	1	5,075	5.25%	0	526	0.54%	0	39,176	40.52%	1	6,392	6.61%	0
1999	253	0.27%	0	38,908	42.15%	1	3,827	4.15%	0	1,988	2.15%	0	26,734	28.96%	1	19,888	21.55%	0
1995	138	0.15%	0	41,991	45.35%	1	2,514	2.72%	0	3,435	3.71%	0	28,037	30.28%	1	15,822	17.09%	0
1994	103	0.11%	0	40,289	44.84%	1	3,716	4.14%	0	3,115	3.47%	0	26,276	29.25%	1	15,670	17.44%	0

=== Detailed ===
==== 2010s ====
===== 2019 =====
Results of the 2019 legislative election held on 29 September 2019:

Party		Votes per district						Total votes	%	Seats
Party		Eisen- stadt City	Greater Eisen- stadt	Matters- burg	Neu- siedl am See	Rust City	Voting card	Total votes	%	Seats
Austrian People's Party	ÖVP	3,523	10,317	9,000	13,659	424	86	37,009	37.28%	1
Social Democratic Party of Austria	SPÖ	1,685	8,572	8,008	10,160	389	58	28,872	29.08%	1
Freedom Party of Austria	FPÖ	1,162	4,327	4,230	6,451	239	57	16,466	16.59%	0
The Greens – The Green Alternative	GRÜNE	1,220	2,478	2,222	2,971	106	87	9,084	9.15%	0
NEOS – The New Austria and Liberal Forum	NEOS	654	1,482	1,371	1,970	69	44	5,590	5.63%	0
JETZT	JETZT	142	410	328	487	15	14	1,396	1.41%	0
KPÖ Plus	KPÖ+	39	114	109	137	5	7	411	0.41%	0
Der Wandel	WANDL	39	82	63	99	5	4	292	0.29%	0
Christian Party of Austria	CPÖ	21	34	27	68	3	1	154	0.16%	0
Valid Votes		8,485	27,816	25,358	36,002	1,255	358	99,274	100.00%	2
Rejected Votes		89	448	400	580	21	1	1,539	1.53%	
Total Polled		8,574	28,264	25,758	36,582	1,276	359	100,813	81.49%	
Registered Electors		10,798	34,307	31,587	45,429	1,594		123,715		
Turnout		79.40%	82.39%	81.55%	80.53%	80.05%		81.49%		

The following candidates were elected:

- Personal mandates - Maximilian Köllner (SPÖ), 6,834 votes; and Christoph Zarits (ÖVP), 7,321 votes.

===== 2017 =====
Results of the 2017 legislative election held on 15 October 2017:

Party		Votes per district						Total votes	%	Seats
Party		Eisen- stadt City	Greater Eisen- stadt	Matters- burg	Neu- siedl am See	Rust City	Voting card	Total votes	%	Seats
Social Democratic Party of Austria	SPÖ	2,151	10,148	9,512	11,858	447	70	34,186	33.21%	1
Austrian People's Party	ÖVP	3,525	9,206	7,826	12,216	371	77	33,221	32.27%	1
Freedom Party of Austria	FPÖ	1,714	6,851	6,225	9,944	347	61	25,142	24.42%	0
NEOS – The New Austria and Liberal Forum	NEOS	419	877	822	1,201	44	38	3,401	3.30%	0
Peter Pilz List	PILZ	364	919	875	1,078	33	45	3,314	3.22%	0
The Greens – The Green Alternative	GRÜNE	347	592	497	777	29	24	2,266	2.20%	0
My Vote Counts!	GILT	60	238	184	232	12	4	730	0.71%	0
Communist Party of Austria	KPÖ	60	123	95	134	6	10	428	0.42%	0
Free List Austria	FLÖ	9	34	49	37	0	0	129	0.13%	0
The Whites	WEIßE	7	37	32	50	0	3	129	0.13%	0
Valid Votes		8,656	29,025	26,117	37,527	1,289	332	102,946	100.00%	2
Rejected Votes		66	300	286	362	10	1	1,025	0.99%	
Total Polled		8,722	29,325	26,403	37,889	1,299	333	103,971	84.77%	
Registered Electors		10,628	33,905	31,514	45,034	1,564		122,645		
Turnout		82.07%	86.49%	83.78%	84.13%	83.06%		84.77%		

The following candidates were elected:

- Personal mandates - Erwin Preiner (SPÖ), 5,336 votes.
- Party mandates - Christoph Zarits (ÖVP), 3,988 votes.

===== 2013 =====
Results of the 2013 legislative election held on 29 September 2013:

Party		Votes per district						Total votes	%	Seats
Party		Eisen- stadt City	Greater Eisen- stadt	Matters- burg	Neu- siedl am See	Rust City	Voting card	Total votes	%	Seats
Social Democratic Party of Austria	SPÖ	1,868	10,576	10,181	13,015	486	59	36,185	36.97%	1
Austrian People's Party	ÖVP	2,744	6,882	5,417	9,546	282	54	24,925	25.46%	0
Freedom Party of Austria	FPÖ	1,157	4,554	4,491	6,924	259	33	17,418	17.79%	0
The Greens – The Green Alternative	GRÜNE	1,025	2,067	1,857	2,348	78	47	7,422	7.58%	0
Team Stronach	FRANK	446	1,631	1,427	1,695	80	13	5,292	5.41%	0
NEOS – The New Austria	NEOS	489	853	792	1,131	35	32	3,332	3.40%	0
Alliance for the Future of Austria	BZÖ	165	607	553	643	20	10	1,998	2.04%	0
Communist Party of Austria	KPÖ	53	149	134	206	6	4	552	0.56%	0
Pirate Party of Austria	PIRAT	62	144	130	187	3	3	529	0.54%	0
Christian Party of Austria	CPÖ	28	56	57	86	2	1	230	0.23%	0
Valid Votes		8,037	27,519	25,039	35,781	1,251	256	97,883	100.00%	1
Rejected Votes		163	609	542	831	24	3	2,172	2.17%	
Total Polled		8,200	28,128	25,581	36,612	1,275	259	100,055	82.58%	
Registered Electors		10,407	33,380	31,166	44,660	1,554		121,167		
Turnout		78.79%	84.27%	82.08%	81.98%	82.05%		82.58%		

The following candidates were elected:

- Personal mandates - Erwin Preiner (SPÖ), 6,175 votes.

==== 2000s ====
===== 2008 =====
Results of the 2008 legislative election held on 28 September 2008:

Party		Votes per district						Total votes	%	Seats
Party		Eisen- stadt City	Greater Eisen- stadt	Matters- burg	Neu- siedl am See	Rust City	Voting card	Total votes	%	Seats
Social Democratic Party of Austria	SPÖ	2,047	11,758	10,980	14,730	524	262	40,301	40.40%	1
Austrian People's Party	ÖVP	3,057	7,287	6,093	10,372	337	212	27,358	27.42%	0
Freedom Party of Austria	FPÖ	1,185	4,316	4,553	6,183	249	155	16,641	16.68%	0
The Greens – The Green Alternative	GRÜNE	857	1,679	1,430	2,093	54	152	6,265	6.28%	0
Alliance for the Future of Austria	BZÖ	407	1,397	1,377	1,940	75	56	5,252	5.26%	0
Liberal Forum	LiF	179	315	307	414	21	37	1,273	1.28%	0
Fritz Dinkhauser List – Citizens' Forum Tyrol	FRITZ	101	314	504	236	15	11	1,181	1.18%	0
Independent Citizens' Initiative Save Austria	RETTÖ	63	156	146	171	2	4	542	0.54%	0
The Christians	DC	56	116	91	185	6	5	459	0.46%	0
Communist Party of Austria	KPÖ	30	141	101	127	8	5	412	0.41%	0
Left	LINKE	18	21	17	20	0	1	77	0.08%	0
Valid Votes		8,000	27,500	25,599	36,471	1,291	900	99,761	100.00%	1
Rejected Votes		202	700	646	910	37	12	2,507	2.45%	
Total Polled		8,202	28,200	26,245	37,381	1,328	912	102,268	86.35%	
Registered Electors		9,902	32,446	30,688	43,891	1,501		118,428		
Turnout		82.83%	86.91%	85.52%	85.17%	88.47%		86.35%		

The following candidates were elected:

- Party mandates - Gerhard Steier (SPÖ), 6,040 votes.

Substitutions:

- Gerhard Steier (SPÖ) resigned on 23 June 2010 and was replaced by Erwin Preiner (SPÖ) on 28 June 2010.

===== 2006 =====
Results of the 2006 legislative election held on 1 October 2006:

Party		Votes per district						Total votes	%	Seats
Party		Eisen- stadt City	Greater Eisen- stadt	Matters- burg	Neu- siedl am See	Rust City	Voting card	Total votes	%	Seats
Social Democratic Party of Austria	SPÖ	2,232	12,332	11,767	15,907	588	1,104	43,930	45.64%	1
Austrian People's Party	ÖVP	3,409	8,519	7,433	12,015	431	1,089	32,896	34.18%	1
Freedom Party of Austria	FPÖ	732	2,180	2,359	3,158	107	230	8,766	9.11%	0
The Greens – The Green Alternative	GRÜNE	828	1,557	1,471	1,909	62	463	6,290	6.53%	0
Hans-Peter Martin's List	MATIN	166	547	585	690	40	58	2,086	2.17%	0
Alliance for the Future of Austria	BZÖ	111	407	433	615	21	31	1,618	1.68%	0
Communist Party of Austria	KPÖ	41	141	162	144	5	12	505	0.52%	0
Initiative 2000	IVE	21	43	39	53	5	4	165	0.17%	0
Valid Votes		7,540	25,726	24,249	34,491	1,259	2,991	96,256	100.00%	2
Rejected Votes		135	565	541	769	25	48	2,083	2.12%	
Total Polled		7,675	26,291	24,790	35,260	1,284	3,039	98,339	86.73%	
Registered Electors		9,361	31,047	29,481	42,031	1,463		113,383		
Turnout		81.99%	84.68%	84.09%	83.89%	87.76%		86.73%		

The following candidates were elected:

- Personal mandates - Edeltraud Lentsch (ÖVP), 6,153 votes.
- Party mandates - Gerhard Steier (SPÖ), 7,321 votes.

===== 2002 =====
Results of the 2002 legislative election held on 24 November 2002:

Party		Votes per district						Total votes	%	Seats
Party		Eisen- stadt City	Greater Eisen- stadt	Matters- burg	Neu- siedl am See	Rust City	Voting card	Total votes	%	Seats
Social Democratic Party of Austria	SPÖ	2,248	12,923	12,296	16,349	583	871	45,270	46.82%	1
Austrian People's Party	ÖVP	4,139	10,136	9,158	14,235	472	1,036	39,176	40.52%	1
Freedom Party of Austria	FPÖ	431	1,569	1,506	2,630	111	145	6,392	6.61%	0
The Greens – The Green Alternative	GRÜNE	673	1,269	1,234	1,535	50	314	5,075	5.25%	0
Liberal Forum	LiF	44	118	162	172	9	21	526	0.54%	0
Communist Party of Austria	KPÖ	20	76	57	89	6	7	255	0.26%	0
Valid Votes		7,555	26,091	24,413	35,010	1,231	2,394	96,694	100.00%	2
Rejected Votes		102	408	396	531	21	22	1,480	1.51%	
Total Polled		7,657	26,499	24,809	35,541	1,252	2,416	98,174	90.33%	
Registered Electors		8,807	29,901	28,210	40,358	1,404		108,680		
Turnout		86.94%	88.62%	87.94%	88.06%	89.17%		90.33%		

The following candidates were elected:

- Personal mandates - Edeltraud Lentsch (ÖVP), 7,120 votes; and Katharina Pfeffer (SPÖ), 7,941 votes.

==== 1990s ====
===== 1999 =====
Results of the 1999 legislative election held on 3 October 1999:

Party		Votes per district						Total votes	%	Seats
Party		Eisen- stadt City	Greater Eisen- stadt	Matters- burg	Neu- siedl am See	Rust City	Voting card	Total votes	%	Seats
Social Democratic Party of Austria	SPÖ	1,959	10,839	10,860	13,866	530	854	38,908	42.15%	1
Austrian People's Party	ÖVP	2,913	6,989	6,127	9,718	297	690	26,734	28.96%	1
Freedom Party of Austria	FPÖ	1,416	5,048	5,035	7,620	292	477	19,888	21.55%	0
The Greens – The Green Alternative	GRÜNE	507	961	907	1,187	33	232	3,827	4.15%	0
Liberal Forum	LiF	271	517	474	561	26	139	1,988	2.15%	0
The Independents	DU	73	198	185	214	11	23	704	0.76%	0
Communist Party of Austria	KPÖ	28	70	60	75	3	17	253	0.27%	0
Valid Votes		7,167	24,622	23,648	33,241	1,192	2,432	92,302	100.00%	2
Rejected Votes		126	438	387	617	16	24	1,608	1.71%	
Total Polled		7,293	25,060	24,035	33,858	1,208	2,456	93,910	87.94%	
Registered Electors		8,738	29,174	27,912	39,600	1,369		106,793		
Turnout		83.46%	85.90%	86.11%	85.50%	88.24%		87.94%		

The following candidates were elected:

- Personal mandates - Franz Steindl (ÖVP), 5,786 votes.
- Party mandates - Katharina Pfeffer (SPÖ), 5,902 votes.

Substitutions:

- Franz Steindl (ÖVP) resigned on 30 April 2000 and was replaced by Johann Loos (ÖVP) on 8 May 2000.

===== 1995 =====
Results of the 1995 legislative election held on 17 December 1995:

Party		Votes per district						Total votes	%	Seats
Party		Eisen- stadt City	Greater Eisen- stadt	Matters- burg	Neu- siedl am See	Rust City	Voting card	Total votes	%	Seats
Social Democratic Party of Austria	SPÖ	2,094	11,857	11,661	15,230	493	806	42,141	45.49%	1
Austrian People's Party	ÖVP	3,135	7,226	6,523	10,235	320	603	28,042	30.27%	1
Freedom Party of Austria	FPÖ	1,264	3,758	3,930	6,073	253	384	15,662	16.91%	0
Liberal Forum	LiF	434	919	873	994	40	199	3,459	3.73%	0
The Greens – The Green Alternative	GRÜNE	298	626	567	828	27	181	2,527	2.73%	0
No – Civic Action Group; Against the Sale of Austria	NEIN	47	191	161	243	2	19	663	0.72%	0
Communist Party of Austria	KPÖ	12	47	40	32	6	2	139	0.15%	0
Valid Votes		7,284	24,624	23,755	33,635	1,141	2,194	92,633	100.00%	2
Rejected Votes		177	613	597	801	28	18	2,234	2.35%	
Total Polled		7,461	25,237	24,352	34,436	1,169	2,212	94,867	90.65%	
Registered Electors		8,514	28,442	27,467	38,883	1,343		104,649		
Turnout		87.63%	88.73%	88.66%	88.56%	87.04%		90.65%		

The following candidates were elected:

- Personal mandates - Franz Steindl (ÖVP), 4,979 votes.
- Party mandates - Matthias Achs (SPÖ), 5,184 votes.

On 28 June 1996 the Constitutional Court annulled the results in the municipality of Donnerskirchen. Results of the re-run held on 13 October 1996:

Party		Votes per district						Total votes	%	Seats
Party		Eisen- stadt City	Greater Eisen- stadt	Matters- burg	Neu- siedl am See	Rust City	Voting card	Total votes	%	Seats
Social Democratic Party of Austria	SPÖ	2,094	11,705	11,661	15,230	493	808	41,991	45.35%	1
Austrian People's Party	ÖVP	3,135	7,215	6,523	10,235	320	609	28,037	30.28%	1
Freedom Party of Austria	FPÖ	1,264	3,917	3,930	6,073	253	385	15,822	17.09%	0
Liberal Forum	LiF	434	895	873	994	40	199	3,435	3.71%	0
The Greens – The Green Alternative	GRÜNE	298	613	567	828	27	181	2,514	2.72%	0
No – Civic Action Group; Against the Sale of Austria	NEIN	47	185	161	243	2	19	657	0.71%	0
Communist Party of Austria	KPÖ	12	46	40	32	6	2	138	0.15%	0
Valid Votes		7,284	24,576	23,755	33,635	1,141	2,203	92,594	100.00%	2
Rejected Votes		177	607	597	801	28	18	2,228	2.35%	
Total Polled		7,461	25,183	24,352	34,436	1,169	2,221	94,822	90.61%	
Registered Electors		8,514	28,442	27,467	38,883	1,343		104,649		
Turnout		87.63%	88.54%	88.66%	88.56%	87.04%		90.61%		

The following candidates were elected:

- Personal mandates - Franz Steindl (ÖVP), 5,024 votes.
- Party mandates - Matthias Achs (SPÖ), 5,172 votes.

===== 1994 =====
Results of the 1994 legislative election held on 9 October 1994:

Party		Votes per district						Total votes	%	Seats
Party		Eisen- stadt City	Greater Eisen- stadt	Matters- burg	Neu- siedl am See	Rust City	Voting card	Total votes	%	Seats
Social Democratic Party of Austria	SPÖ	1,936	11,461	11,320	14,411	483	678	40,289	44.84%	1
Austrian People's Party	ÖVP	2,926	7,017	6,251	9,223	291	568	26,276	29.25%	1
Freedom Party of Austria	FPÖ	1,256	3,730	3,679	6,433	256	316	15,670	17.44%	0
The Greens – The Green Alternative	GRÜNE	423	915	927	1,232	36	183	3,716	4.14%	0
Liberal Forum	LiF	420	838	761	914	39	143	3,115	3.47%	0
No – Civic Action Group; Against the Sale of Austria	NEIN	46	160	131	176	8	14	535	0.60%	0
Communist Party of Austria	KPÖ	12	25	29	32	5	0	103	0.11%	0
United Greens Austria – List Adi Pinter	VGÖ	8	21	22	26	0	0	77	0.09%	0
Citizen Greens Austria – Free Democrats	BGÖ	5	15	10	27	0	5	62	0.07%	0
Valid Votes		7,032	24,182	23,130	32,474	1,118	1,907	89,843	100.00%	2
Rejected Votes		188	516	472	791	28	52	2,047	2.23%	
Total Polled		7,220	24,698	23,602	33,265	1,146	1,959	91,890	88.29%	
Registered Electors		8,497	28,219	27,367	38,627	1,370		104,080		
Turnout		84.97%	87.52%	86.24%	86.12%	83.65%		88.29%		

The following candidates were elected:

- Personal mandates - Franz Steindl (ÖVP), 6,059 votes.
- Party mandates - Matthias Achs (SPÖ), 3,299 votes.
