= Christoph Zarits =

Austrian politician (born 1980)

Member of the National Council
- Incumbent
- Assumed office 9 November 2017
- Constituency: Burgenland North

Personal details
- Born: 16 September 1980 (age 45)
- Party: People's Party

Christoph Zarits (born 16 September 1980) is an Austrian politician of the People's Party. He has been a member of the National Council since 2017, and has served as deputy leader of the People's Party in Burgenland since 2024.
