= Lake Neusiedl =

Steppe lake in Central Europe

Lake Neusiedl / Fertő
- Neusiedler See (German); Fertő tó (Hungarian)
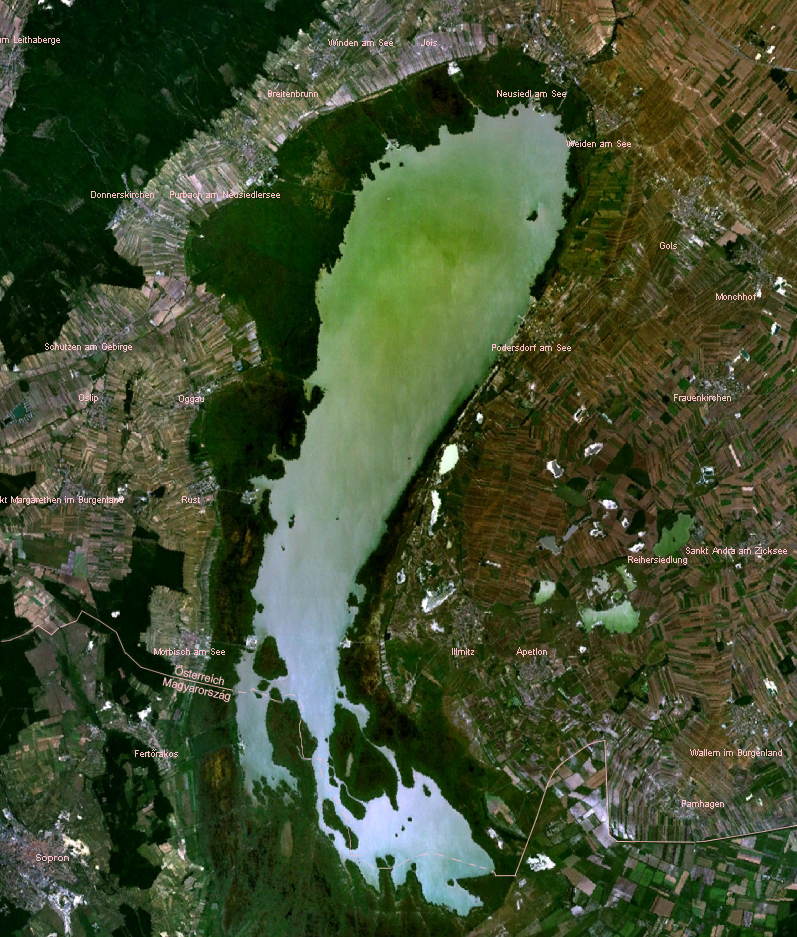
- Satellite image of Lake Neusiedl

- Location within Austria
- Location: Austria, Hungary
- Coordinates: 47°50′N 16°45′E
- Type: Endorheic, saline
- Primary inflows: precipitation, Wulka
- Primary outflows: evaporation (90%) Einserkanal (artificial)
- Catchment area: 1,120 km^{2} (430 sq mi)
- Basin countries: Austria, Hungary
- Max. length: 36 km (22 mi)
- Max. width: 12 km (7.5 mi)
- Surface area: 315 km^{2} (122 sq mi)
- Average depth: 1 m (3 ft 3 in)
- Max. depth: 1.8 m (5 ft 11 in)
- Water volume: 0.325 km^{3} (0.078 cu mi)
- Surface elevation: 115.45 m (378.8 ft)
- Settlements: Neusiedl am See, Rust

UNESCO World Heritage Site
- Official name: Fertő/Neusiedlersee Cultural Landscape
- Type: Cultural
- Criteria: v
- Designated: 2001 (25th session)
- Reference no.: 772
- Region: Europe and North America

Ramsar Wetland
- Official name: Neusiedlersee, Seewinkel & Hanság
- Designated: 16 December 1982
- Reference no.: 271

Ramsar Wetland
- Official name: Lake Fertö
- Designated: 17 March 1989
- Reference no.: 420

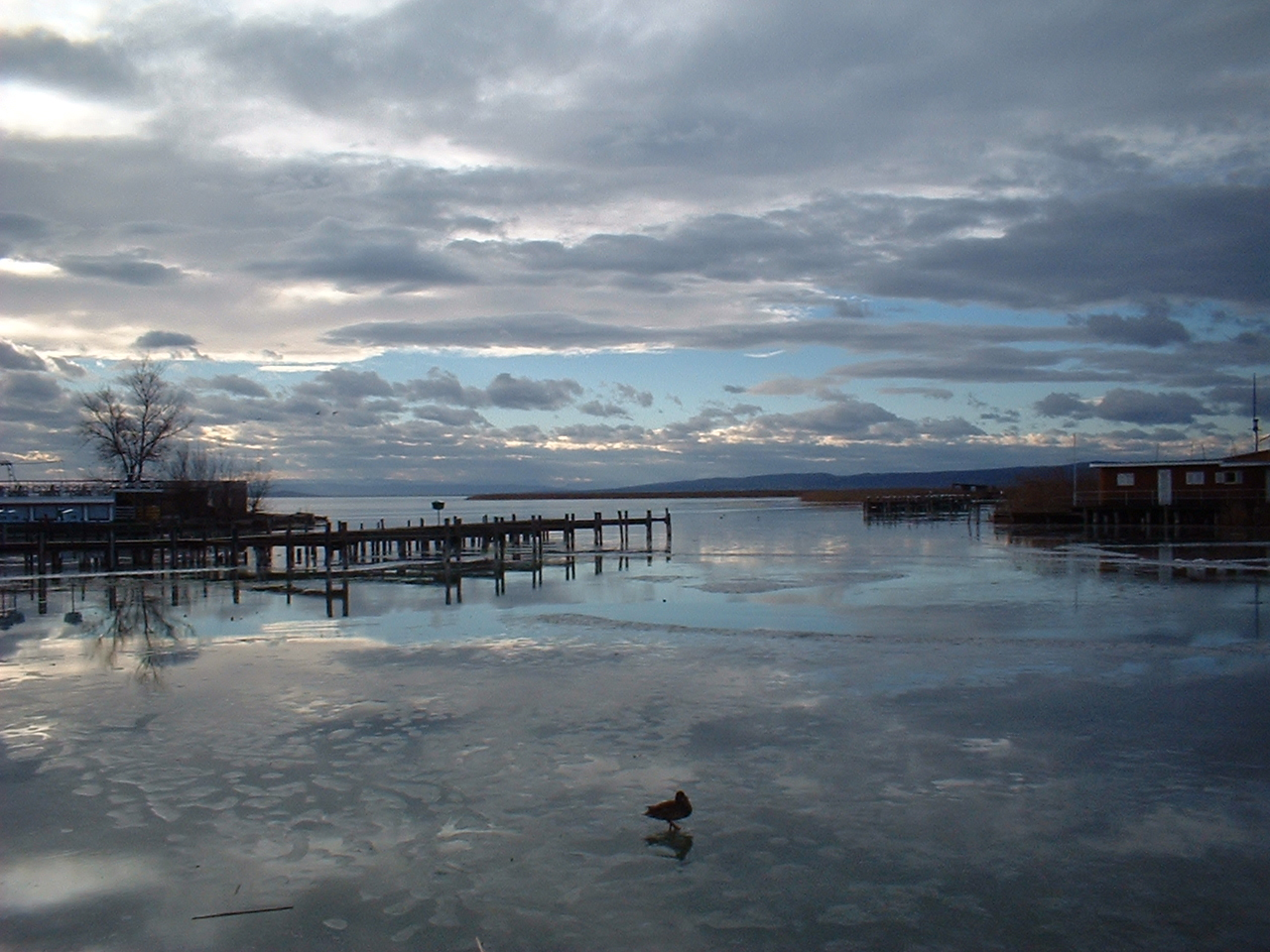
Lake Neusiedl

Lake Neusiedl (German: Neusiedler See, pronounced [ˈnɔʏˌziːdlɐ ˈzeː]; Croatian: Nežidersko jezero or Niuzaljsko jezero; Slovene: Nežidersko jezero; Slovak: Neziderské jazero; Czech: Neziderské jezero) or Lake Fertő (Hungarian: Fertő tó), is the largest endorheic lake in Central and Western Europe, as well as the second largest in Europe after The Caspian Sea, straddling Austria and Hungary. The lake is saline and covers 315 km^{2} (122 sq mi), of which 240 km^{2} (93 sq mi) is on the Austrian side and 75 km^{2} (29 sq mi) on the Hungarian side. Its drainage basin is about 1,120 km^{2} (430 sq mi), about three times its size excluding the lake itself. From north to south, the lake is about 36 km (22 mi) long, and it is between 6 km (3 1/2 mi) and 12 km (7 1/2 mi) wide from east to west. On average, its surface is 115.45 m (378.8 ft) above the Adriatic Sea and it is no more than 1.8 m (5 ft 11 in) deep.

The surrounding landscape has been occupied since about 6000 BC, and the towns and villages around the lake have been trading and meeting points for local people and wider cultures for centuries. Given its cultural importance and the often handed-down, rustic architecture of the villages, Lake Neusiedl and environs is inscribed on the UNESCO World Heritage List since 2001.

== Water level fluctuations ==
In the past, rainfall caused significant floods (which in 1768 enlarged the lake to its greatest known size of 515 km^{2} [199 sq mi]) whereas aridity led to shrinkage. Yet as a function of its water table, frequent changes resulted from weather changes.

Stratigraphy shows that the lake bed has totally dried up at least 100 times since its formation in 18,000–14,000 BCE. The lake's complete disappearances - particularly 1740–1742, 1811–1813, and most recently in 1866, when the private diary of a local, Gottlieb Wenzel, noted that he crossed its bed on 4 June without soiling his boots - were greatly documented. Parts of the lake bed were claimed for agriculture; wheat and turnips were being planted. However, in 1871 the lake began to return and by the spring of 1876 it had already reassumed its usual size. The last (brief and partial) vanishing took place during the summer of 1949 when the northern part of the lake bed (to the approximate latitude of Podersdorf) fell dry for a few weeks. Each time the drying-up of the lake bed caused major environmental disruptions:

- The humidifying and heatwave counteraction of the large water body fell absent
- Winds blew large amounts of salty dust into the surrounding villages.

On earlier occasions the lake was sometimes referred to as a "swamp", suggesting a very low water level with an expansion of reeds throughout the lake bed. Two records dated to 1318 and 1324, respectively mention a "river", implying that at this time the lake might have been reduced to a narrow north-to-south slightly flowing body of water.

Today bank overflow is stopped by an artificial outflow, the Einserkanal, and a sluice on Hungarian territory near Fertőújlak, and bilateral issues are dealt with by the Austro-Hungarian water commission which was established in 1956. However, comparatively minor fluctuations continue to occur. In 1965 the lake gained 100 million cubic metres (3.5 billion cubic feet) of water within one month, raising its level by 35 cm (14 inches). A falling away by 30 cm (12 inches) within one year took place amid the drought of 2003. Both events are deemed within normal range, as noted publicly by the local planning law authorities. Evaporation can be exacerbated or compensated by the effects of air pressure, alone, giving a range of 75 cm (30 inches). The lake is sensitive to changes in its equilibrium, as recent climate change scenario simulations have shown.

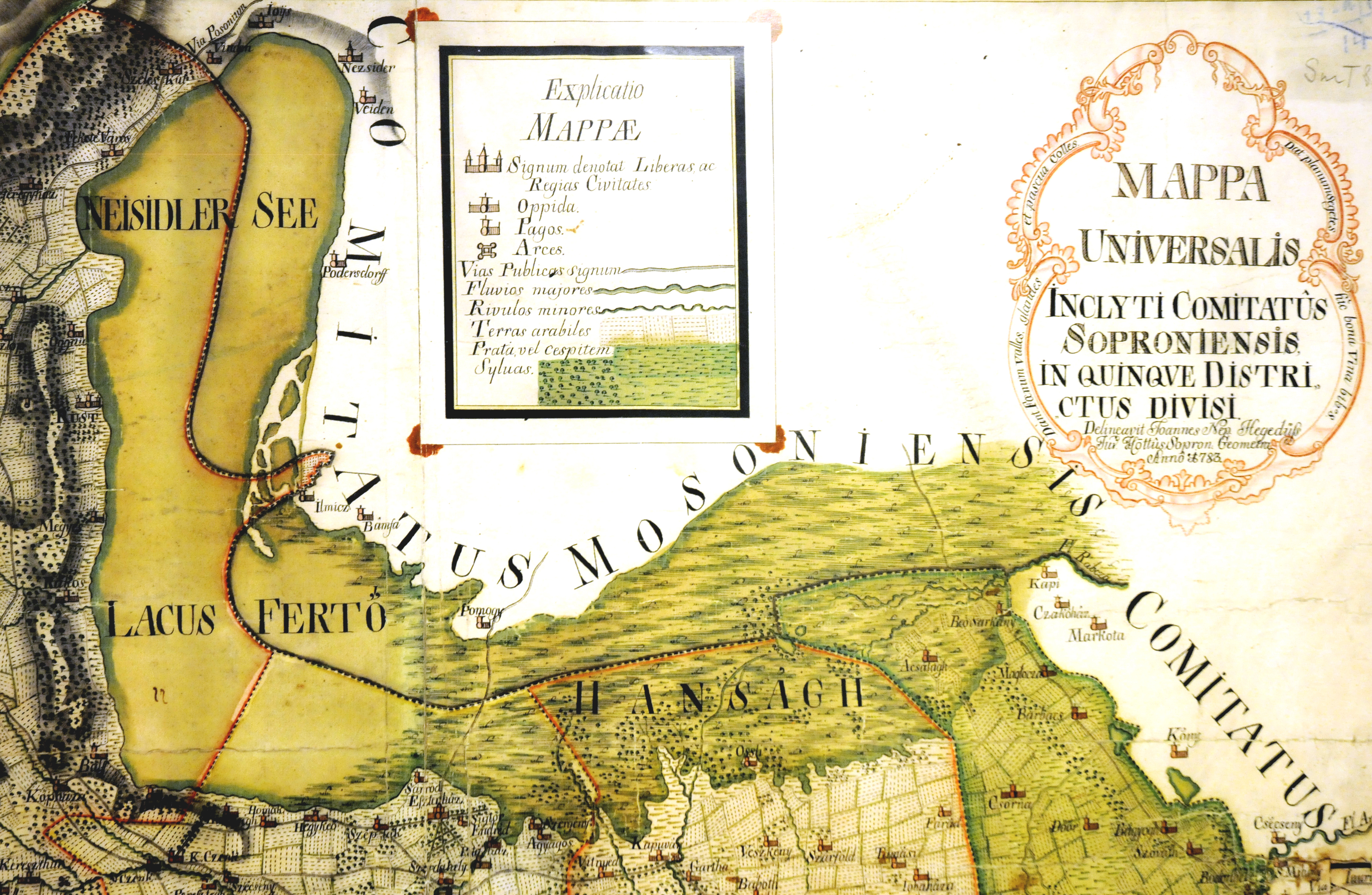
Lake Neusiedl in 1783 contiguous with the extensive Hanság swamp extending eastward

Before the regulation works of the 19th century, the lake reached in the southeast to the marshlands of the Hanság (German: Waasen) which have been increasingly drained and claimed for agriculture from the 16th century onward. Originally, the lake was thus closely connected to the Danube and the Rába river systems.

== Nature and wildlife ==
Most of the lake is surrounded by reeds, a habitat for wildlife (making the lake an important resting place for migratory birds). Reeds are harvested in winter as soon as the ice is solid enough. This serves its ecology (removal of the bulk of organic matter that would otherwise decay in the lake) and the local economy (the reed is sold for various purposes, mostly related to construction and housing). During the summer months, there are occasional reed fires, as dry reed is easily flammable; these often spread quickly as it tends to be windy. Water quality is determined by temperature, wind, and by the amount of salt and mud emanating with the ground water from the sediments.

Several plans for dams and other intrusive construction works for economic growth/sustainable energy directly threatened its endemic biotopes (rather uniform and rare still, brackish water and temperate climate habitats for hundreds of species) were mooted during the first half of the 20th century. A drainage scheme to recover much land which would be reasonably fertile soil as well as intensive aquaculture had been finalized and approved in 1918. This was aborted when most of the lake became Austrian territory after World War I ended that year. In 1971 plans for a bridge across the Austrian part of the lake were thwarted by environmentalists.

In 1993 the National Park Neusiedler See-Seewinkel gained international acceptance as an IUCN Category II preserve. In 2001 the national parks in Austria and Fertő-Hanság in Hungary were together accepted as a World Heritage Site. Lake Neusiedl See and its surrounding areas in Austria also enjoy protection through the Ramsar Convention on Wetlands.

=== Mammals ===
Over 40 mammal species have been recorded from the area, including the European ground squirrel, the steppe polecat and the European hamster.

=== Birds ===
In the area over 300 bird species have been recorded with the earliest studies made by the Hungarian naturalist István Fászl. Of these, around 150 breed, representing around 40% of the European and 80% of all Austrian bird species. The area contains one of the largest breeding populations of great egrets, with up to 700 pairs. There are also around 35 pairs of grey heron and 70 pairs of great bustard. One of the best known bird species in the area is the white stork, which is seen as a symbol of the region. Other species present include Eurasian spoonbill, purple heron, eastern imperial eagle, white-tailed eagle, greylag goose, golden oriole, European bee-eater, pied avocet, ruff, Kentish plover, common tern, common redshank, black-tailed godwit, Eurasian curlew, western yellow wagtail, short-eared owl, Montagu's harrier, bittern and many others which are of interest to local and visiting birdwatchers.

=== Fish ===
Native fish species include the pike, zander, European carp and wels catfish, alongside numerous minnows, such as stickleback, common bleak, white bream, common bream and ruffe. The European eel is not native to the lake, but was introduced as a food source for humans. Due to environmental concerns, further releases of young eels has been banned. Prussian carp has also been introduced, alongside the pumpkinseed.

=== Amphibians ===
The European tree frog is a common species in the area. Other amphibians that can be found, especially in the reed belt and the lakeside edge, include common toad, European green toad, common spadefoot, moor frog, agile frog, pool frog, marsh frog, edible frog and the European fire-bellied toad. Danube crested newt and smooth newt are also present.

=== Reptiles ===
Reptiles are represented by the grass snake and a number of lizard species including the European green lizard, sand lizard and the common lizard. Occasionally, dice snakes may be seen, but the meadow viper, which was previously identified around the lake, has not been seen since 1973.

== Towns and villages around the lake ==
Traces of human settlement around Lake Neusiedl go back to the Neolithic period. The area became densely populated from the 7th century BC onward, initially by people of the Hallstatt culture and remained so throughout Roman times. In 454 Theodoric the Great, the preeminent king of the Ostrogoths, was born here. Near Fertőrákos there are two Roman villas and a 3rd-century Mithras temple open to visitors.

The more important extant towns lying on the lake's shore are Illmitz (Illmic), Podersdorf am See (Pátfalu), Weiden (Védeny), Neusiedl am See (Nezsider), Jois (Nyulas), Winden (Sásony), Breitenbrunn (Fertőszéleskút), Purbach am Neusiedlersee (Feketeváros), Donnerskirchen (Fertőfehéregyháza), Oggau (Oka), Rust (Ruszt) and Mörbisch (Fertőmeggyes) in Austria, and Sopron, Fertőrákos, Fertőboz, Fertőd, Balf and Fertőújlak in Hungary, with the communities of Illmitz, Apetlon (Mosonbánfalva) and Podersdorf am See forming the so-called Seewinkel (lake corner), which is located between the lake and the Hungarian border. Hungarian names of Austrian towns lying on the lake's shore are given in parentheses.

== Gallery ==
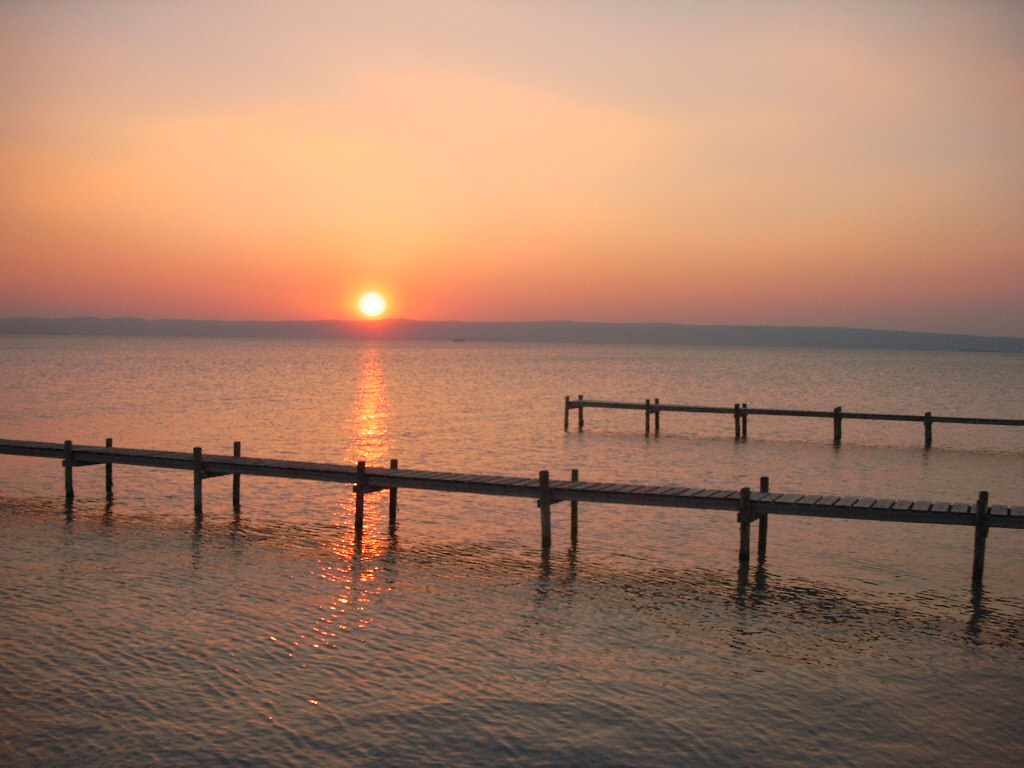
Podersdorf am See / Austria

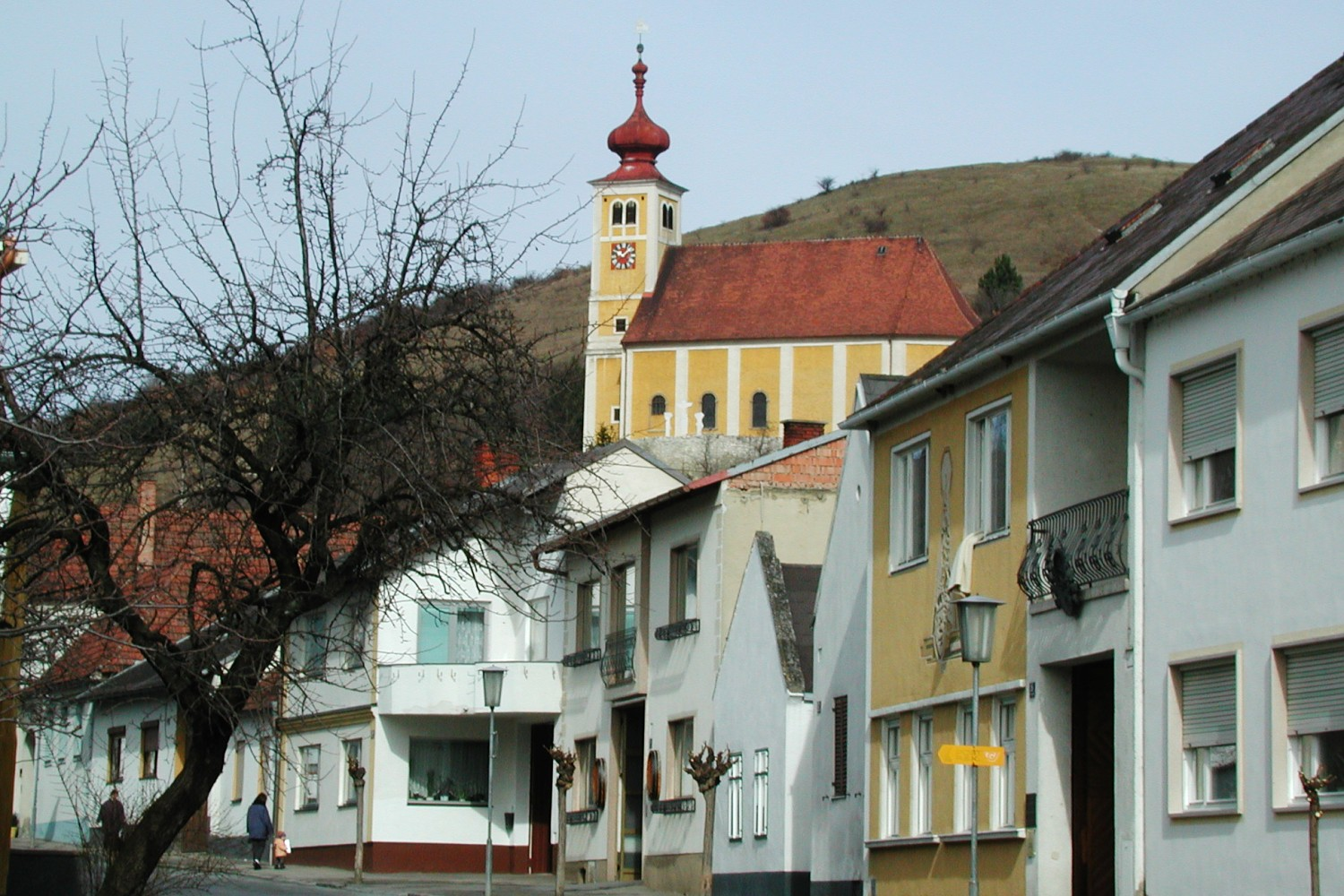
Donnerskirchen / Austria

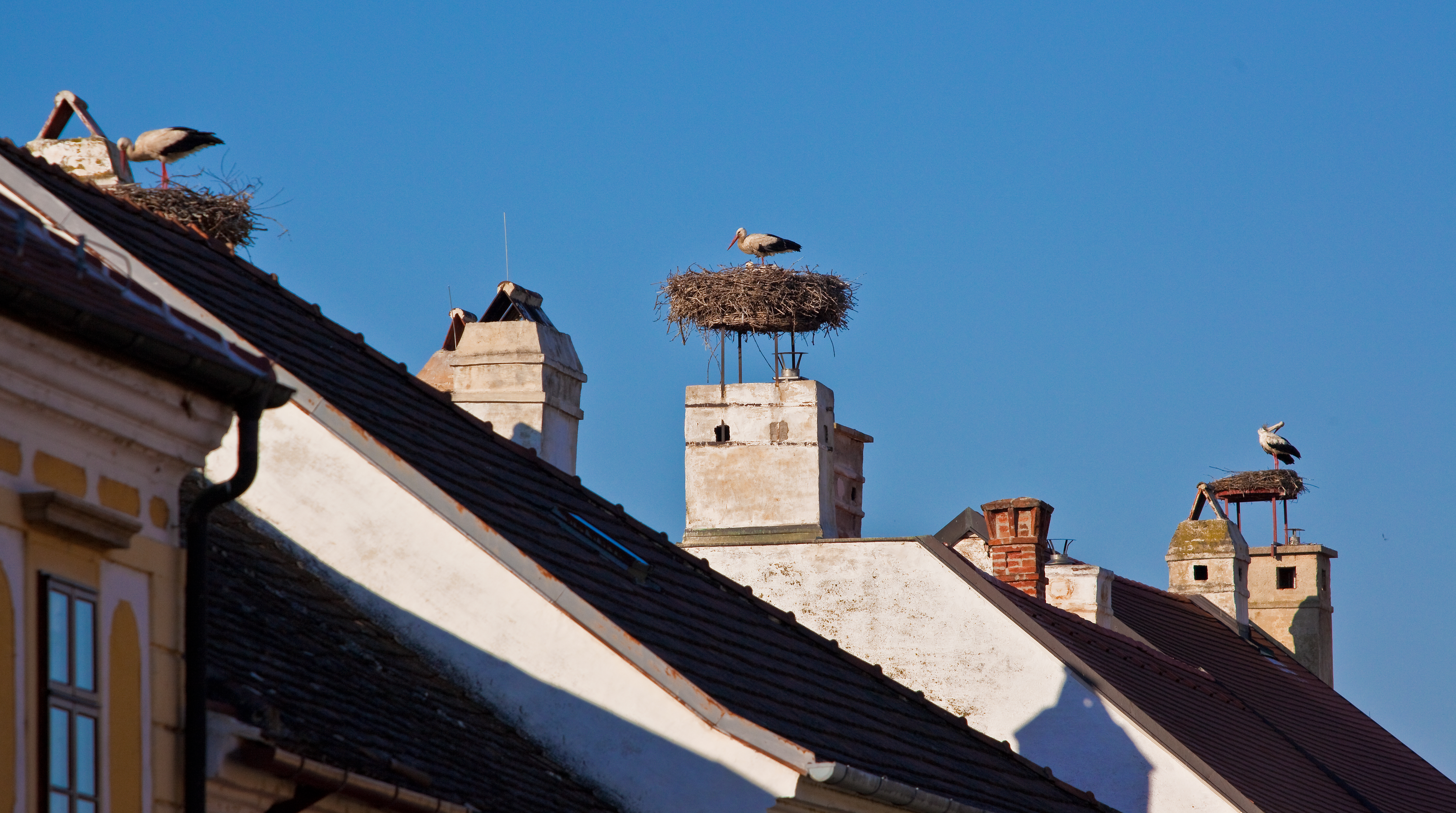
White stork's nests typical of the region

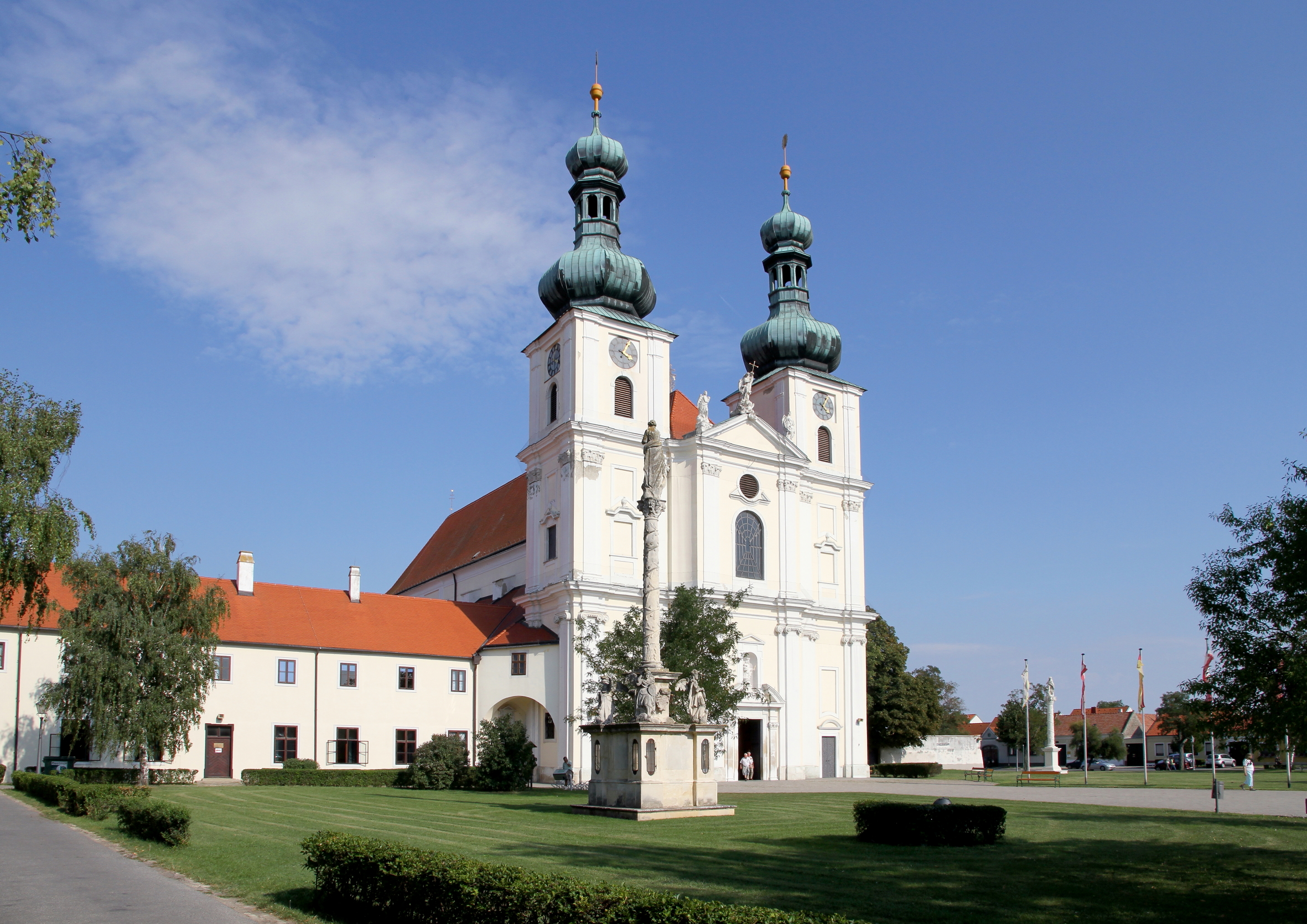
Frauenkirchen / Austria

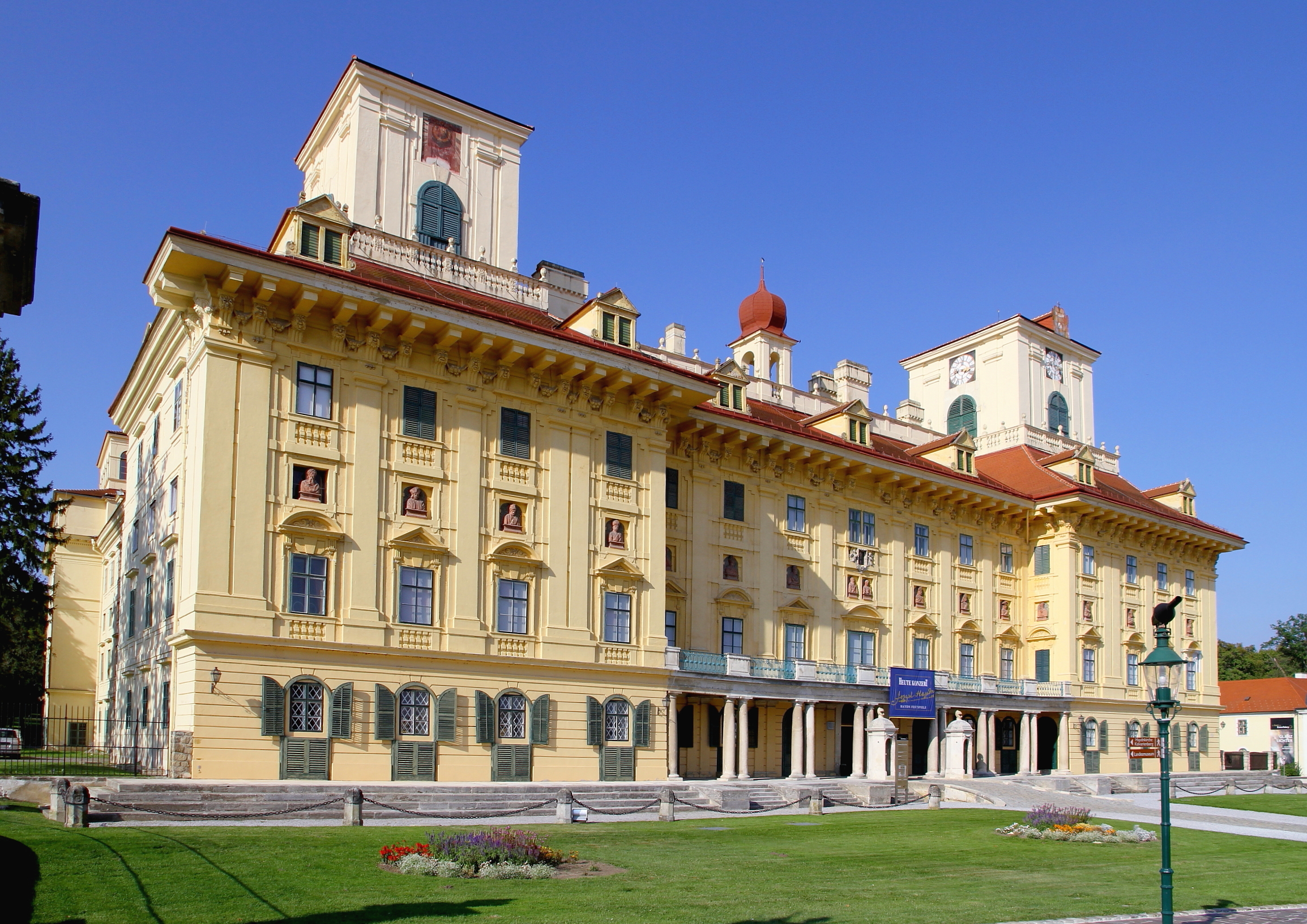
Schloss Esterházy / Austria

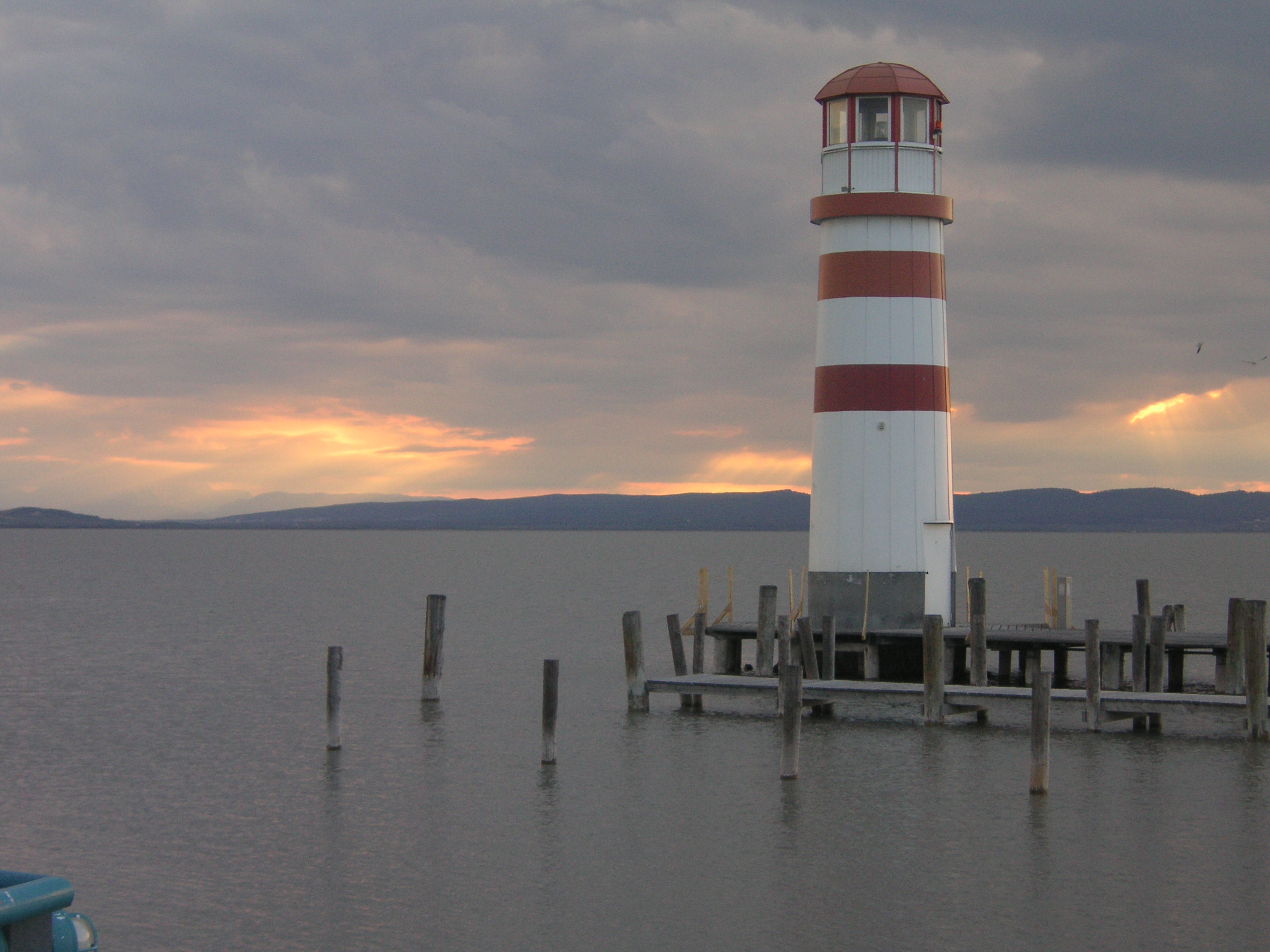
Lake Neusiedl at Podersdorf during sunset

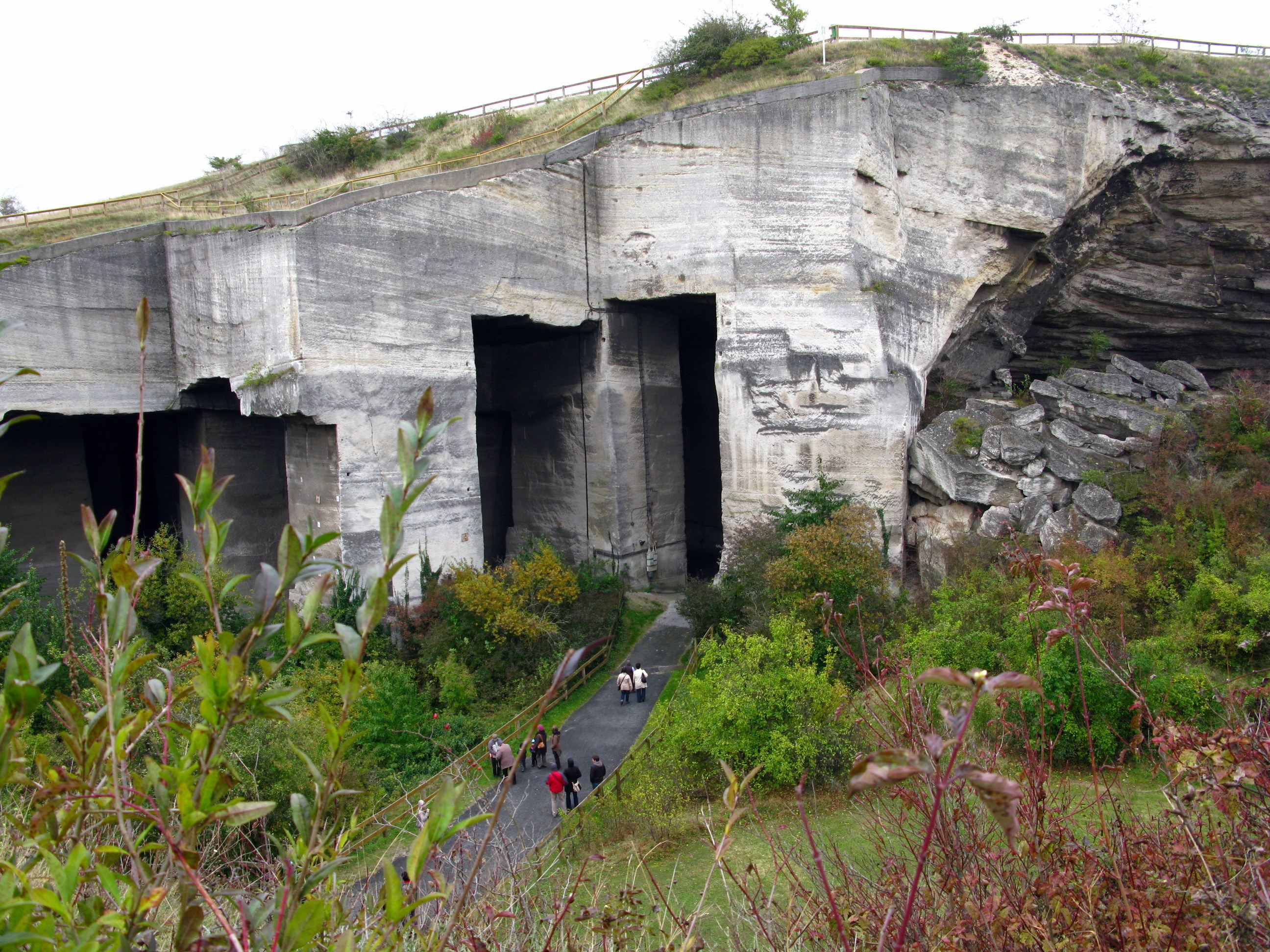
Cave in Fertőrákos / Hungary

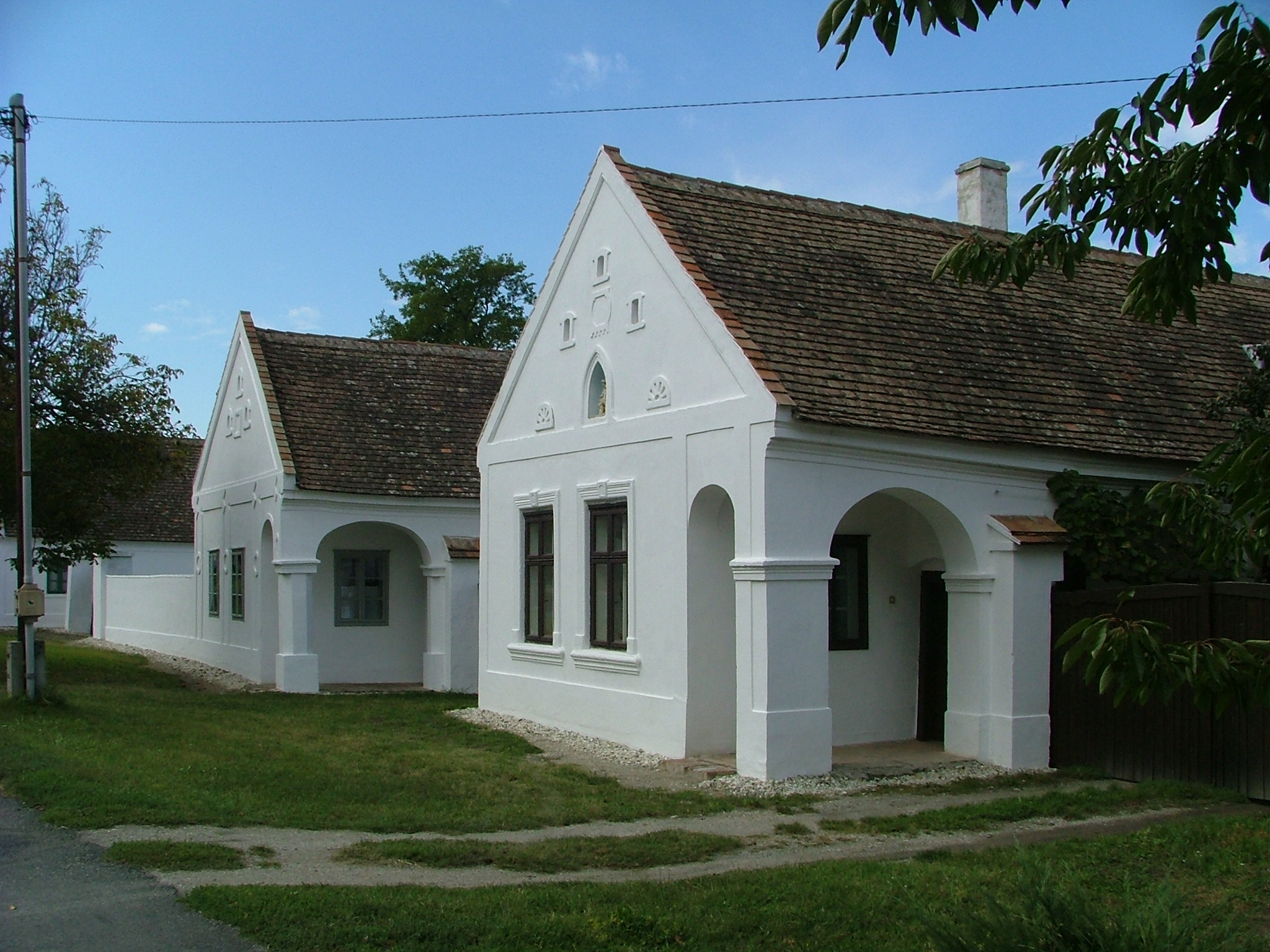
Fertőszéplak / Hungary

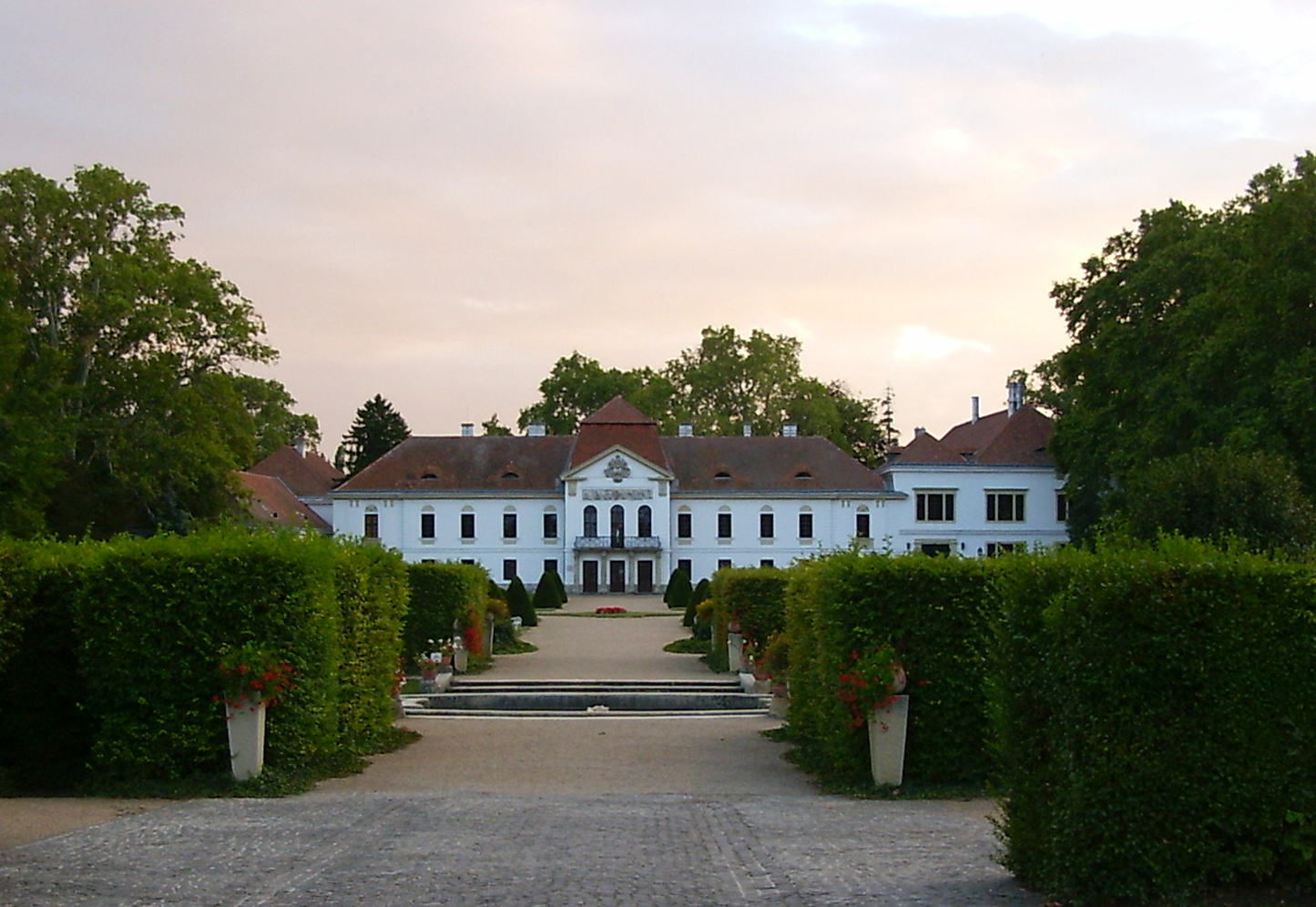
Széchenyi Palace in Nagycenk / Hungary

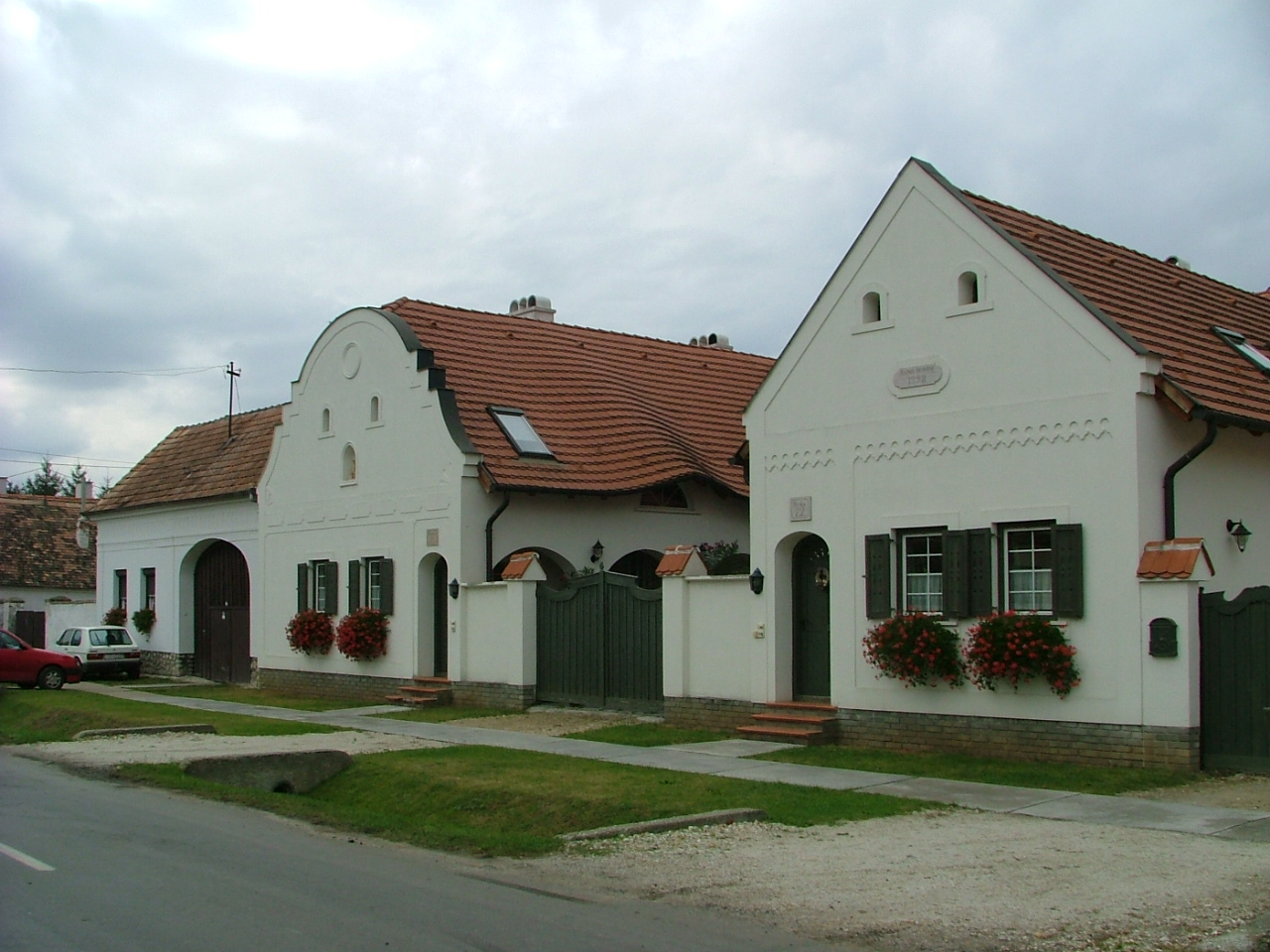
Sarród / Hungary

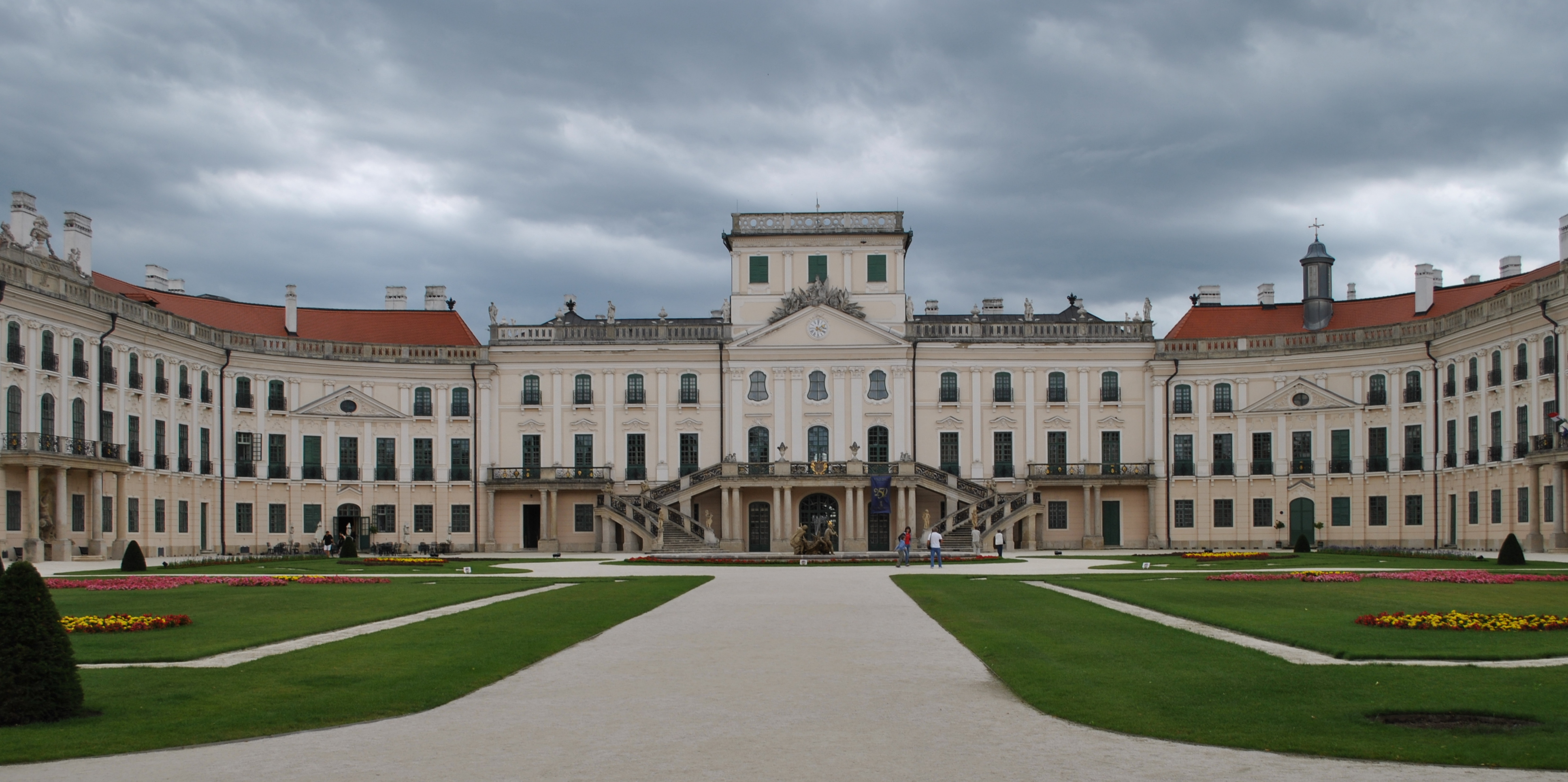
Esterházy Palace / Hungary

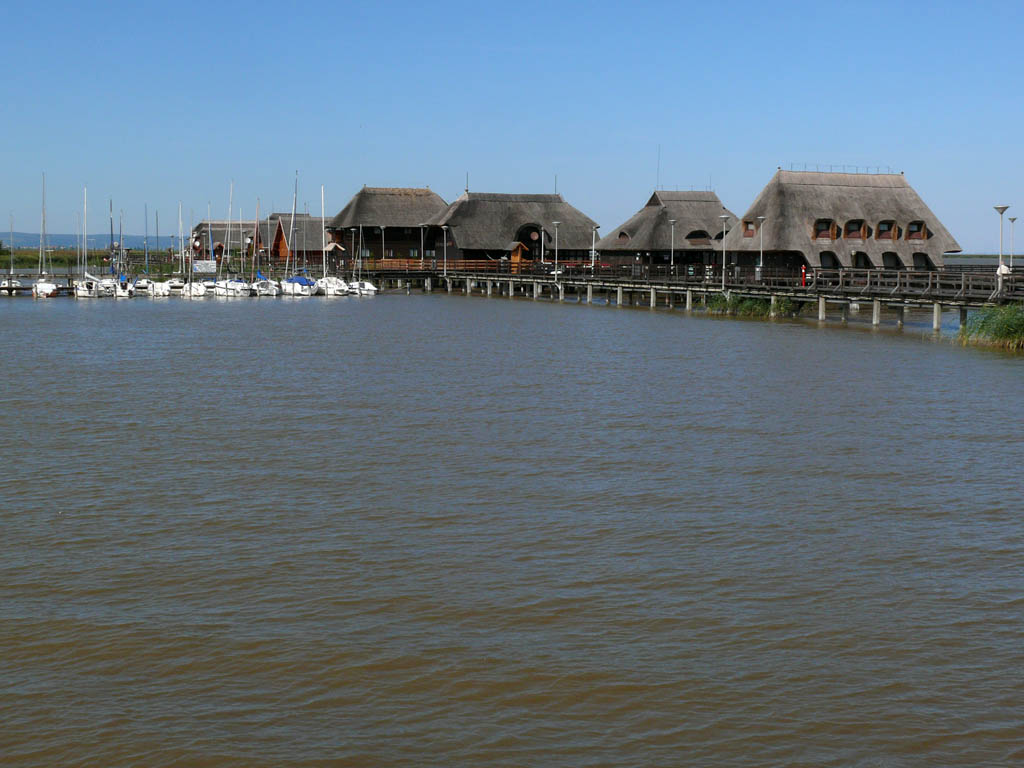
Fertő tó

== Tourism ==
Despite remaining a protected wildlife habitat, the region of Lake Neusiedl, particularly in its Austrian part, draws significant numbers of tourists. The lake is known as the "Sea of the Viennese", as it offers ample opportunities for sailing and windsurfing at a reasonable distance from Vienna. There is also some commercial fishing.

Low water levels at times cause sailing and fishing boats to run aground much more frequently and many moorings suffer. However, they somewhat help the annual freestyle mass crossing, by foot, from Mörbisch to Illmitz. Everybody who can swim and is more than 160 cm (5 ft 3 in) in height can participate in this event, which was revived in 2004.

== See also ==
- Wulka
- List of lakes
- List of World Heritage Sites in Austria
