= Illmitz =

- Municipality
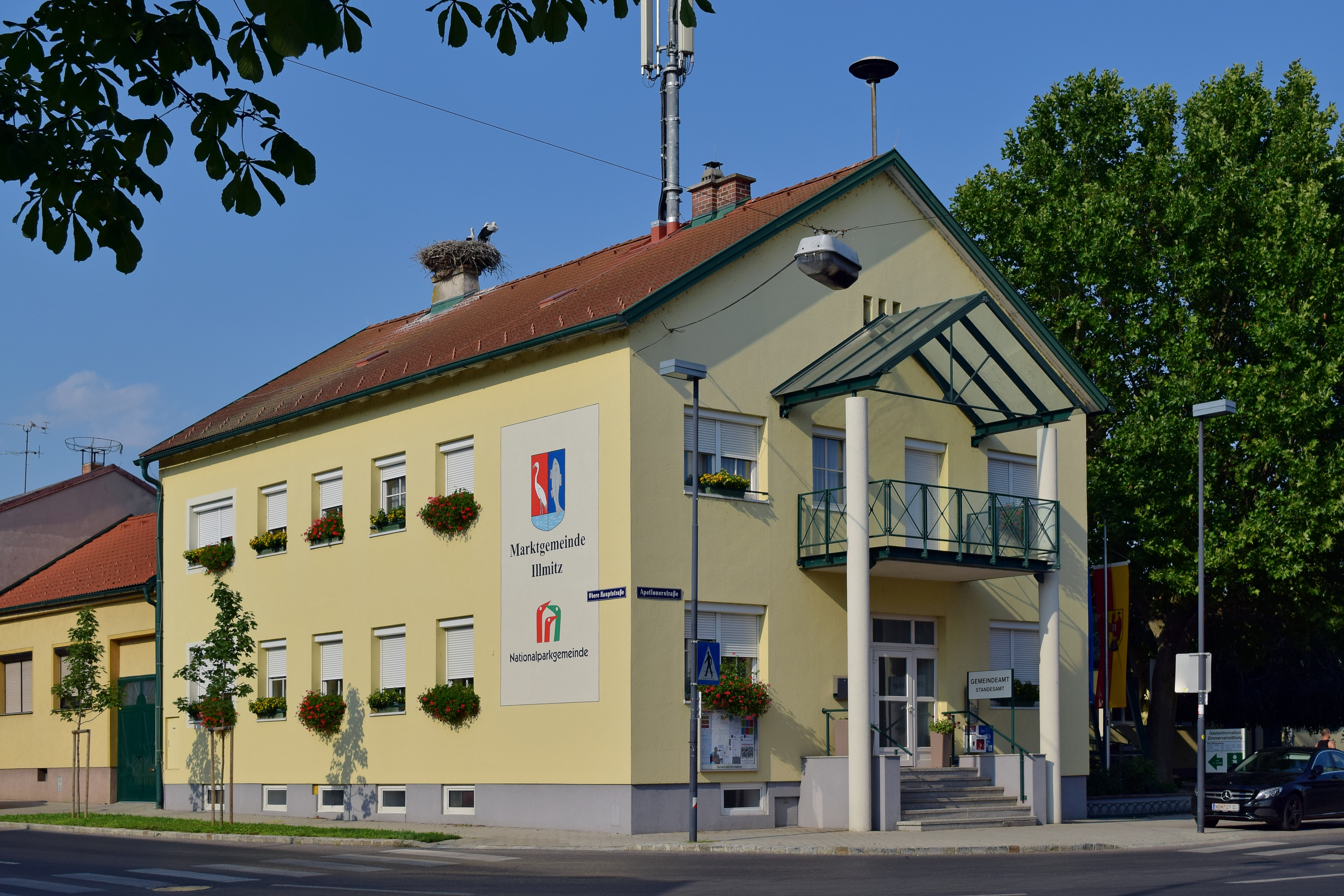
- Municipal office

- Coat of arms

- Location within Austria
- Coordinates: 47°46′N 16°48′E
- Country: Austria
- State: Burgenland
- District: Neusiedl am See

Government
  - Mayor: Maximilian Köllner (SPÖ)

Area
  - Total: 91.85 km^{2} (35.46 sq mi)

Population (2018-01-01)
  - Total: 2,385
  - Density: 25.97/km^{2} (67.25/sq mi)
- Time zone: UTC+1 (CET)
  - Summer (DST): UTC+2 (CEST)
- Postal code: 7142
- Area code: +43 2175
- Website: www.illmitz.co.at

Illmitz (German pronunciation: [ˈɪlmɪt͡s]; Hungarian: Illmic) is a market town in the district of Neusiedl am See in Burgenland in Austria. It is located in a region to the east of the Lake Neusiedl (German: Neusiedlersee; Hungarian: Fertő tó) which is named the Seewinkel (lake corner).

== Geography ==
Illmitz is in the Neusiedler See-Seewinkel National Park on the eastern shore of Lake Neusiedl. The town is at an elevation of 117 meters above sea level. Nearby, an area 114 m (374 ft) above sea level is the lowest elevation of Austria. Characteristic of the area are wide open plains and salt marsh flora, with many small salt lakes around. The Lange Lacke (Long Lake) is the largest of about forty such lakes nearby.

== History ==
In 1867, the Austrian Empire was dissolved, and Austria-Hungary was formed, with separate governments in Vienna and Budapest. After the First World War, Burgenland was named Deutsch-Westungarn (German-West Hungary) in the 1919 Treaty of St. Germain and the Treaty of Trianon and was awarded to Austria in 1919. Since 1921, the town has been part of the newly founded State of Burgenland. In December 2001, the National Park Neusiedler See-Seewinkel was named a UNESCO World Heritage Site.

== Population ==
Historical population
| Year | Pop. | ±% |
|---|---|---|
| 1869 | 1,662 | — |
| 1880 | 1,898 | +14.2% |
| 1890 | 1,853 | −2.4% |
| 1900 | 1,929 | +4.1% |
| 1910 | 1,867 | −3.2% |
| 1923 | 2,042 | +9.4% |
| 1934 | 2,165 | +6.0% |
| 1939 | 2,241 | +3.5% |
| 1951 | 2,261 | +0.9% |
| 1961 | 2,316 | +2.4% |
| 1971 | 2,376 | +2.6% |
| 1981 | 2,392 | +0.7% |
| 1991 | 2,517 | +5.2% |
| 2001 | 2,595 | +3.1% |
| 2011 | 2,470 | −4.8% |
| 2016 | 2,359 | −4.5% |

== Economy and infrastructure ==
In Illmitz the primary business is wine production. The city is surrounded by fields with grapevines in them. Tourism also is significant. Every year in May, many ornithologists come from all over Europe to see bird species which include nationally rare vagrants, often visiting the national park information centre located within the town. Long before the establishment of the national park, the Lange Lacke (Long Lake) already was an important nature reserve. Lange Lacke is the largest of about forty salt lakes near the town. It has more than 100 years of scientific data collected on bird life. The bird population and grape growers are in conflict, and farmers have sonic cannons in the fields to frighten birds from eating the grapes.

Although only small, Illmitz is known to wine lovers worldwide. Winemakers such as Alois Kracher, Willi Opitz and Stefan Tschida and Salzl are famous for their noble sweet wines.

== Notes ==
On highway signs, the name of the town is also spelled Jllmitz because the capital "I" and small "l" characters look similar on the Austrian Highway sign font.
