= National Park Neusiedler See-Seewinkel =

National park in Austria

Neusiedler See-Seewinkel National Park
- IUCN category II (national park)
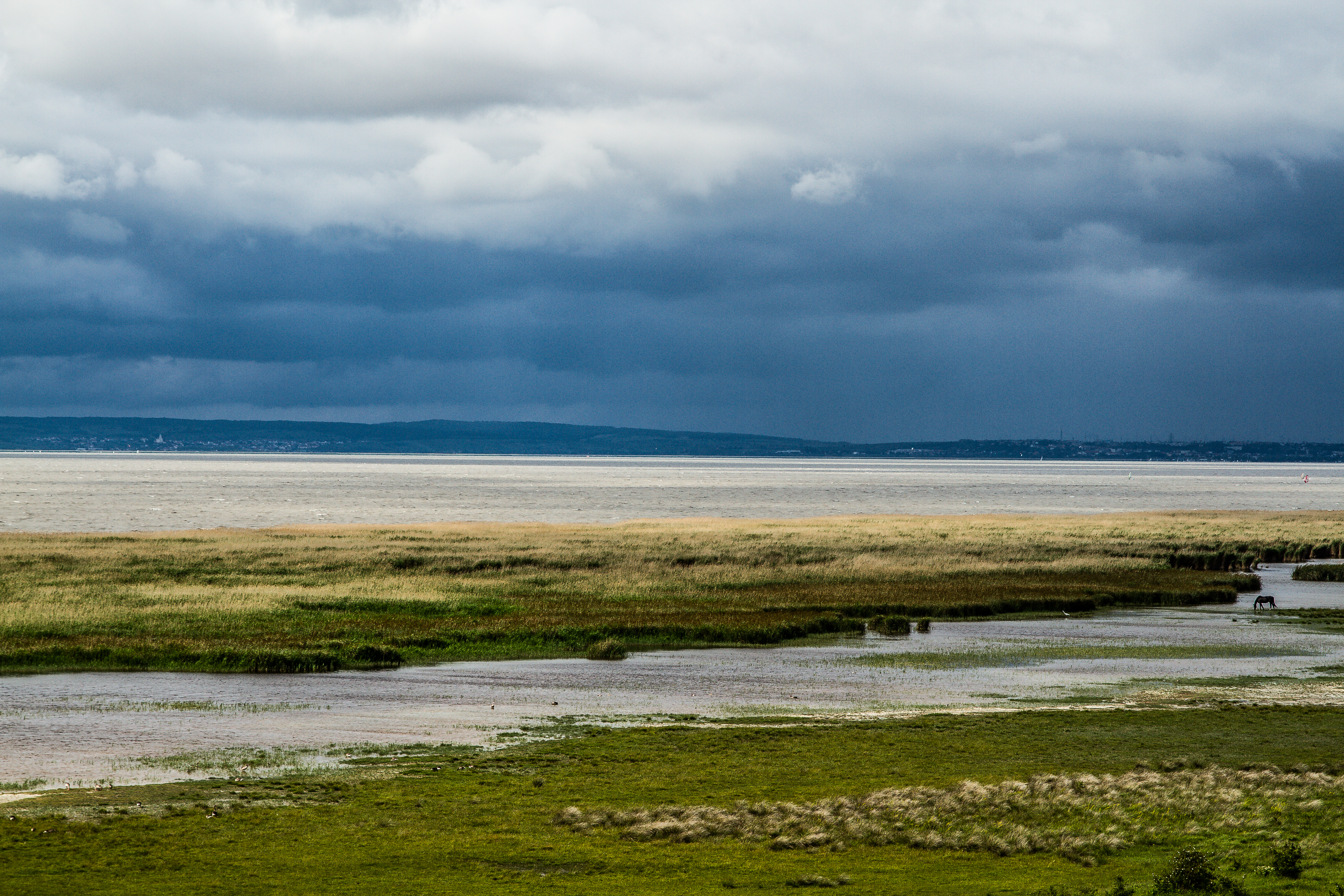
- Neusiedler See-Seewinkel National Park, south of Podersdorf

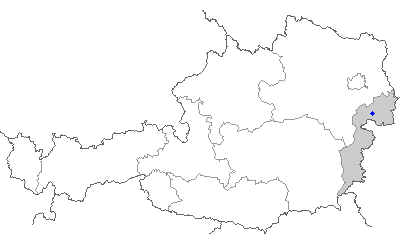
- Location: Burgenland
- Nearest city: Rust
- Coordinates: 47°43′12″N 16°45′52″E
- Area: 97 km^{2} (37 sq mi)
- Established: 1993
- Website: https://www.nationalparksaustria.at/en/national-park-neusiedler-see.html

Neusiedler See-Seewinkel National Park (German: Nationalpark Neusiedler See-Seewinkel) is a national park in eastern Austria. The park extends over an area of 97 square kilometres of the province of Burgenland and protects parts of an endorheic and westernmost lake of the Eurasian Steppe.

== History ==
This national park is located on the eastern edge of the Alps and on the western edge of the Little Hungarian Plain. Because of its location, the area has, for centuries, been a buffer zone between the great powers of Europe. In 1994, it was the first national park in Austria to receive a category II label from the IUCN. The Austrian part of the national park was declared a UNESCO World Heritage Site in 2001.

== Description ==
The area of the national park is a meeting point for different plant and animal species. These include alpine, pannonian, asian, mediterranean and northern European species. This results in a mosaic of environments, including wetlands, herding meadows, meadows, sand steppes and salt areas. In the west the area is bordered by the Leitha Mountains, the Parndorf Plain in the north and the Hanság in the east. The mire of Hanság was for centuries a part of Lake Neusiedl. Lake Neusiedl itself is situated at the lowest point of the Little Hungarian Plain at an altitude of around 115m above sea level.

The ownership structure of the national park Neusiedler See-Seewinkel is different from that of other national parks in Austria. Neusiedlersee-Seewinkel is not owned by any government but rather by around 1,200 different owners. Most of them are local farmers that receive a yearly compensation for leaving these plots unused.

The national park has a visitor information centre, which is located in the town of Illmitz.

== Flora and Fauna ==
=== Birds ===
The national park is known for its varied birdlife, with some of the 178 breeding species found at their westernmost edges of their distribution, whilst the national park also attracts regular vagrant bird species, which form a substantial proportion of the more than 350 species recorded in the area. Rare species have included the first Austrian records of Pacific golden plover in 2008, semipalmated sandpiper in 2013 and blue-cheeked bee-eater in 2016. Some of the most sought after species for birdwatchers include great bustard, pygmy cormorant, ferruginous duck, little crake, European bee-eater and Syrian woodpecker.

=== Flora ===
Notable plant species include Suaeda pannonica and Lepidium cartilagineum, as well as blue iris and Siberian iris.
