= St. Pantaleon-Weyer concentration camp =

Coordinates: 48.0449°N 12.8820°E

The Labor Education- and Gypsy Detention Camp St. Pantaleon-Weyer is a former National Socialist detention camp in the municipal area of St. Pantaleon, today again called Haigermoos, in Upper Austria. The camp existed as a Labor Education Camp from July 1940 until the beginning of 1941, when it was converted into a Gypsy Detention Camp and used as such up to November of the same year. Today, a memorial place reminds of this prison.

== History ==
The camp was situated in Weyer, a part of the municipality Haigermoos, which belonged to the municipality Sankt Pantaleon until 1945.

=== The Labor Education Camp ===
The Labor Education Camp existed from July 5, 1940, until about January 7, 1941. From July 7, 1940, until the end of August 1940, the inn Göschl in Moosach in the parish of Sankt Georgen bei Salzburg served as an edifice for the camp. Then, the Ortsgruppenleiter, the landlord and agriculturalist Michael Kaltenegger, as well as the Gaufürsorgeverband, the organization that officially ran the camp, provided the property of the landlord Geratsdorfer in Weyer as a sublease. Kaltenegger himself had leased it from the economically struggling landlord. The prisoners were deployed in the regulation of the river Moosach.

In letters of the Gauleiter August Eigruber from May 31, 1940 and of the Nazi appointee Kubinger from September 10, 1941 directed to all mayors of the district Oberdonau, the purpose of the camp is described as follows:

“Admitted can be such fellow citizens, that on principle refuse work, that skip work, that constantly cause disturbances at the work site, or that refuse any taking up of work at all, despite being physically fit. They all, however, have to have reached the age of 18. Also “anti-social” managing directors are included. Only cases of criminal nature cannot be covered in this setting. And serious cases of invalids, as hard physical labors have to be performed.”

Corresponding to these guidelines, persons classified as “disagreeable” were consequently brought into the camp; So for example Karl Grumpelmaier from Mauthausen, the manager of a big woodworking business, because he refused to purchase a banner of the German Labor Front. The two teenage prisoners Oskar Heinrich and Heinrich Müller had refused to take part in the company-facilitated sports activities of the paper mill Steyrermühl and were – because they had not reached the age of 18 yet – unlawfully detained in Weyer as “anti-socials”. It is proven in many cases that not only “anti-socials” were admitted to the camp.

Only upon their arrival at the camp the inmates were informed about the reasons of their arrest. There were no legal means; on their arrival, resorts of violence through the camp leader August Steininger were regularly the case. The so-called “education” became the responsibility of the camp personnel, which was composed of the SA-Standarte 159 from Braunau am Inn – whom also the camp commandant belonged to. With the continued existence of the camp, the violence of the SA became more and more prominent. The first person to die in the camp was Johann Gabauer from Julbach, who was left lying next to his fellow workers with fatal injuries. Numerous severely injured were admitted to the circumjacent hospitals. An extract from a medical history:

“Welts were discovered all over the body. E. temporarily regained conscience at the hospital and related that he had been thrown into the water repeatedly. He died on September 4th 1940. The chief doctor initiated a postmortem examination, in which superficial and bleeding damages of the epithelial layer were detected spread all over the back, especially on the protruding parts of the back, the back of the head and the upper arm. They apparently are the results of physical abuse.”

After the death of Joseph Mayer, who came from Neukirchen, the camp physician Alois Staufer saw the opportunity to personally emerge from being involved – which he had become through issuing innocuous death certificates for camp victims. He presented the circumstances of the case to the local court Wildshut. A year-and-a-half-long struggle ensued concerning the arraignment against the superintendent and the camp management, but also against important Nazi figures such as Franz Kubinger and the district superintendent Stefan Schachermayer. The charges that were approved by the ministry of Justice in Berlin consisted of the following:

- Manslaughter
- Gross physical abuse
- Confinement of individuals under the age of 18
- Confinement of individuals that couldn't be declared as “reluctant to work”

The Labor-Education-Camp Weyer was closed in the beginning of January 1941 in view of the impending lawsuit. Some of the prisoners were discharged in exchange for a vow of silence; others were transferred to concentration camps.

The efforts of the Gauleitung for an abolishment of the lawsuit proved to be successful. The charge against a total of five defendants was dismissed on April 16, 1942, by authorization of Hitler himself.

=== The Gypsy Detention Center ===
From January 19, 1941, after the rushed closing of the Labor Education Camp, the district authorities detained more than 350 Austrian Sinti and Romanies in Weyer. The camp St. Pantaleon was now called "Gypsy Detention Camp" (Zigeunerlager), similar to the camp Lackenbach in Burgenland, that had been established at about the same time. The camp staff was replaced, one gendarmerie leader and ten police reservists formed the supervisory staff, and an officer of the criminal investigation department Linz was appointed camp commander. The SA-Sturmführer Gottfried Hamberger remained administrator.

The prisoners in St. Pantaleon were meant to continue with the drainage and regulation activities, however, more than half of the detainees were women and children. Whereas in the Labor Education Camp the camp physician reported death to the registrar, it was now the camp commander or administrator who assumed this duty. The mentioned cause of death is often exceedingly strange: “life-weakness” or “heart failure” with children, "Herzfleischentartung" with an elderly lady. The dead bodies of the Sinti were – according to consistent testimonies of contemporary witnesses – for the time being deposited between shovels and pots in the gravedigger's cell at the cemetery Haigermoos, and then buried during the night – without discernible gravesite.

The camp was closed down on November 4, 1941, the inmates were loaded into cattle cars and – after a three-day stop over in Lackenbach, Burgenland – were brought, together with 4,700 other people, to the Gypsy Camp of the Ghetto Litzmannstadt in Łódź, Poland. No one ever returned from there.

== Repercussions ==
After the war, a People's Court Lawsuit was initiated against the people in charge. However, it dragged on up until 1952 because of the flight of two of the main defendants. The lawsuits ended in convictions, the sentences ranged between 15 months and 15 years of prison. The lawsuit against the camp commander August Steininger ended in 1952 with two years and six months of imprisonment. The “Gypsy Detention Camp” was not even mentioned in the trials of the People's Court after 1945. Even in the lawsuit against Gottfried Hamberger, also an administrator in the camp, the Camp II was not mentioned. And already in April 1955, all convicts were released on the occasion of the amnesty for the ten-year existence of the Second Republic. As from 1949, the Austrian political parties courted for the benevolence of former Nazis at national elections, and from 1950, they often were integrated into community politics.

As in many other cases of the same subject matter, this period of history was suppressed or deliberately avoided. So, for example, in the chronicles of the municipality of St. Pantaleon, which were published in 1979 on the occasion of the anniversary of the “Innviertel by Austria”, and in which still only the soldiers killed in the war were mentioned.

== The memorial ==
Only in the late 1980s, people started to concern themselves with the history of the camp. Ludwig Laher, an author living in St. Pantaleon, and Andreas Maislinger, a historian who was born in the neighboring parish Sankt Georgen bei Salzburg, initiated the erection of a memorial site. It was designed by the artist Dieter Schmidt coming from Fridolfing, Bavaria and inaugurated in 2000. The memorial site is maintained by the municipality St. Pantaleon and the society Memorial Site Camp Weyer.

Through the memorial, the municipality Sankt Pantaleon commemorates also its own responsibility as the then competent administration. It is situated within the boundaries of today's municipality Sankt Pantaleon, and not on the premises of the Weyer concentration camp, which belong to today's municipality Haigermoos.

== Pictures ==
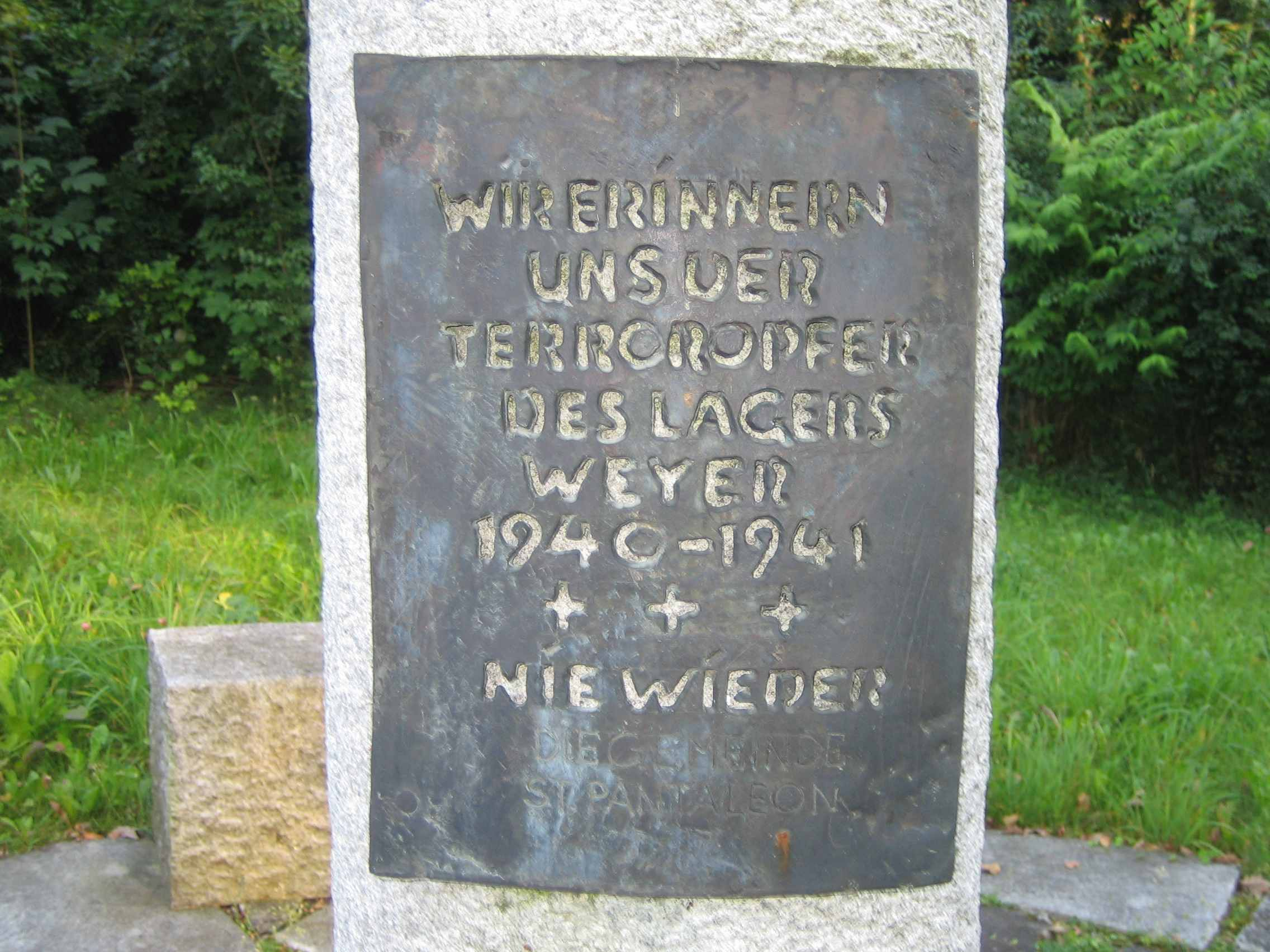
Memorial Site

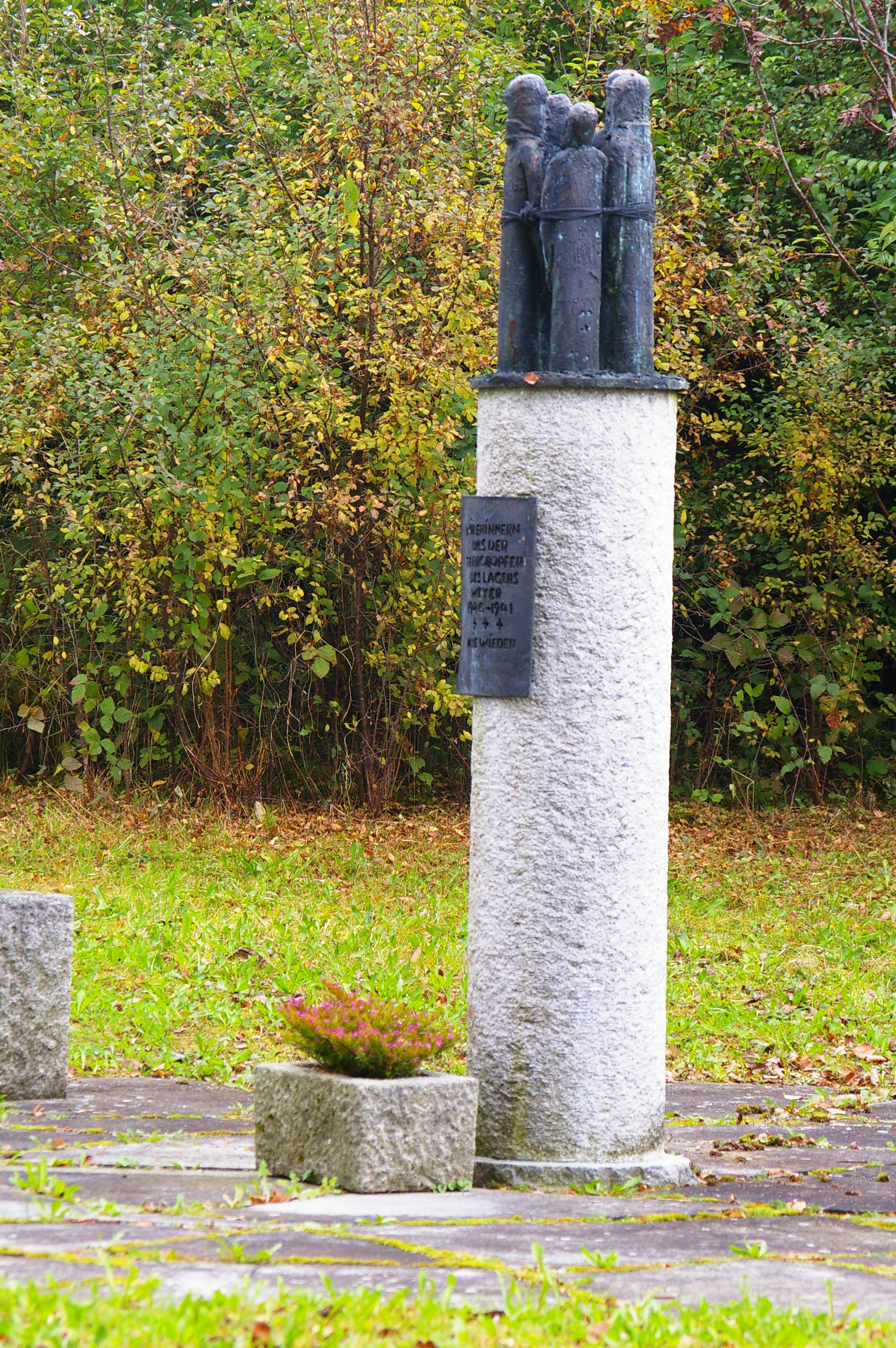
Memorial Site at the river Moosach

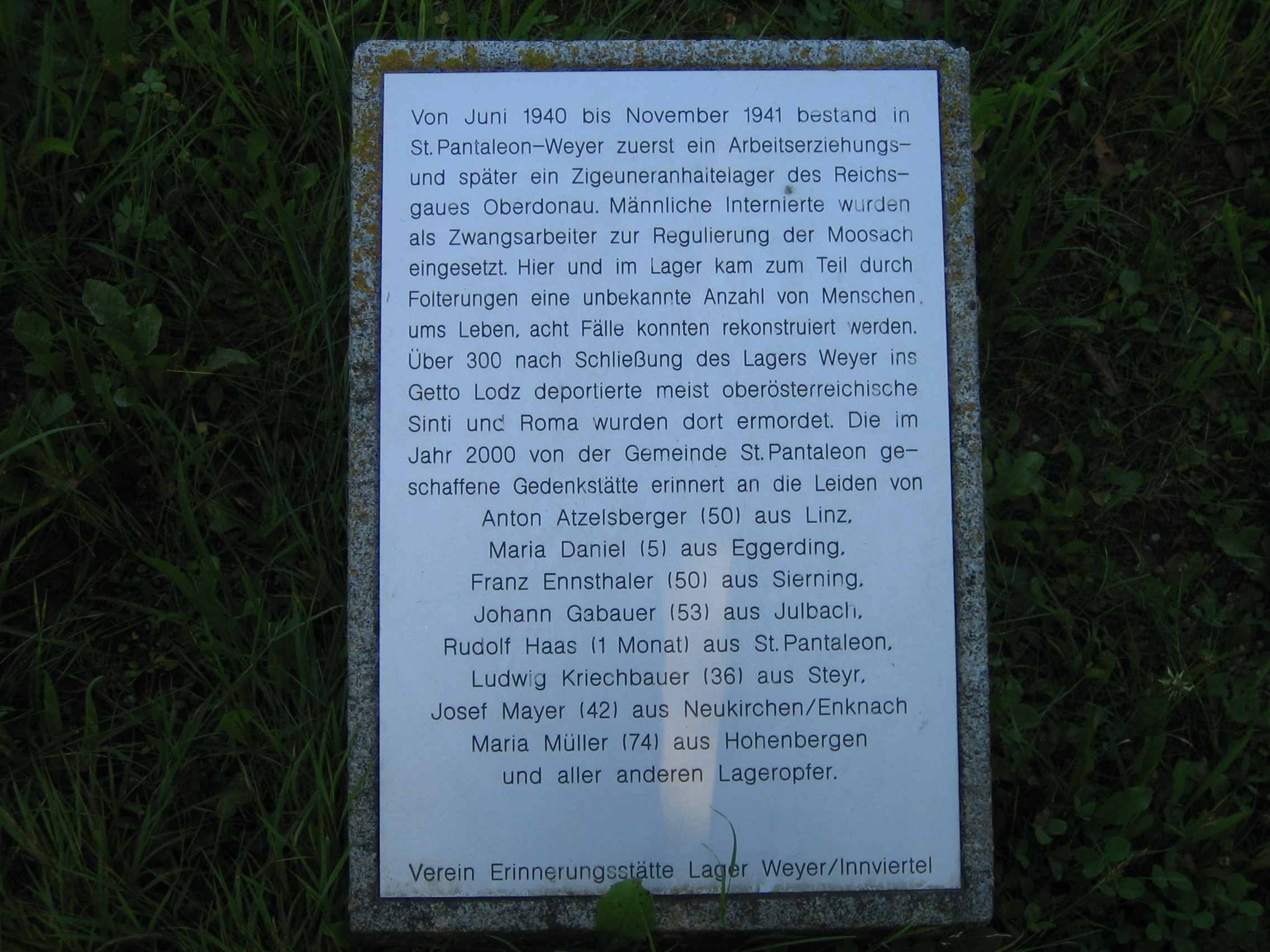
Information Board at the Memorial Site

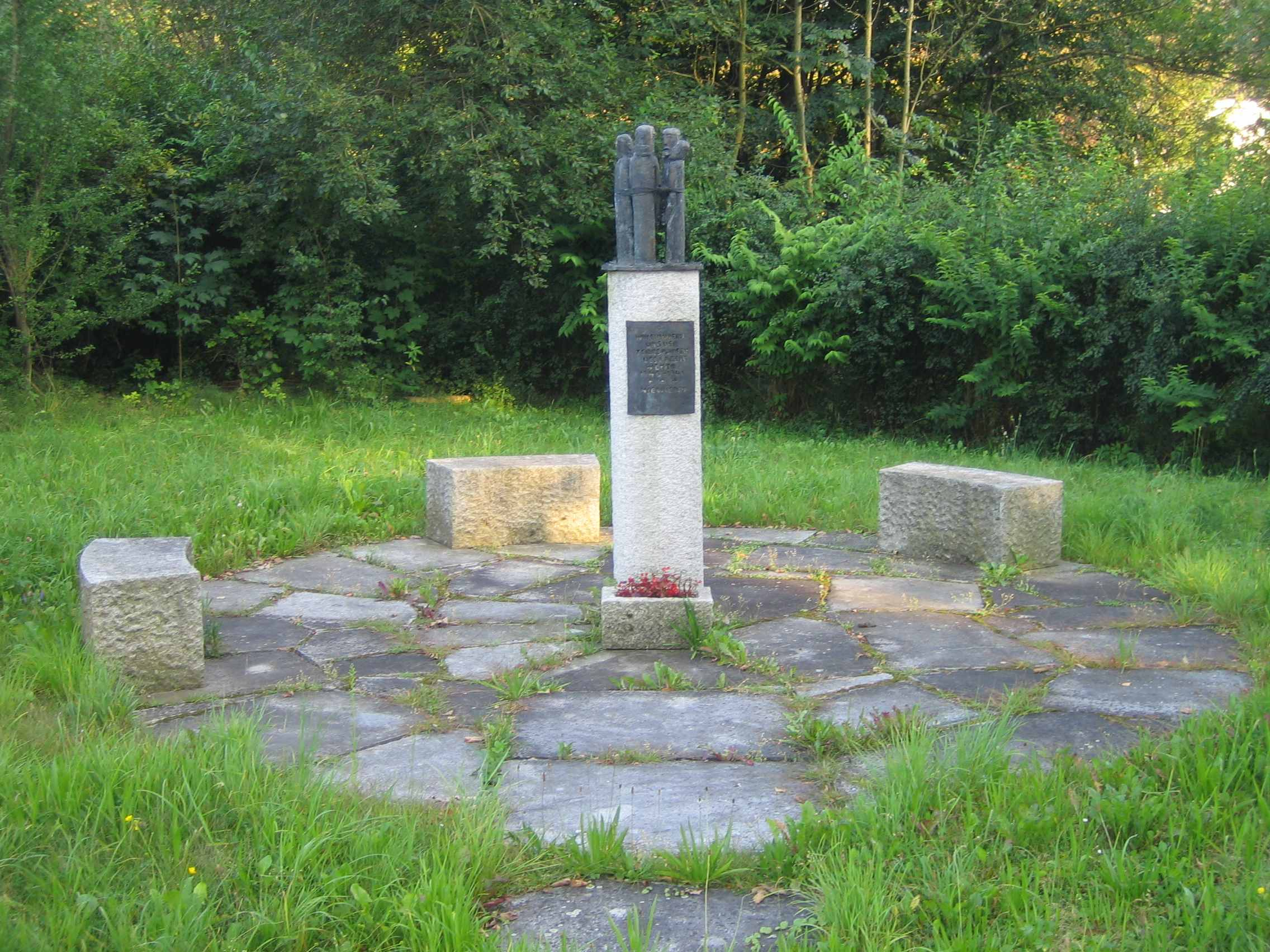
Memorial Site

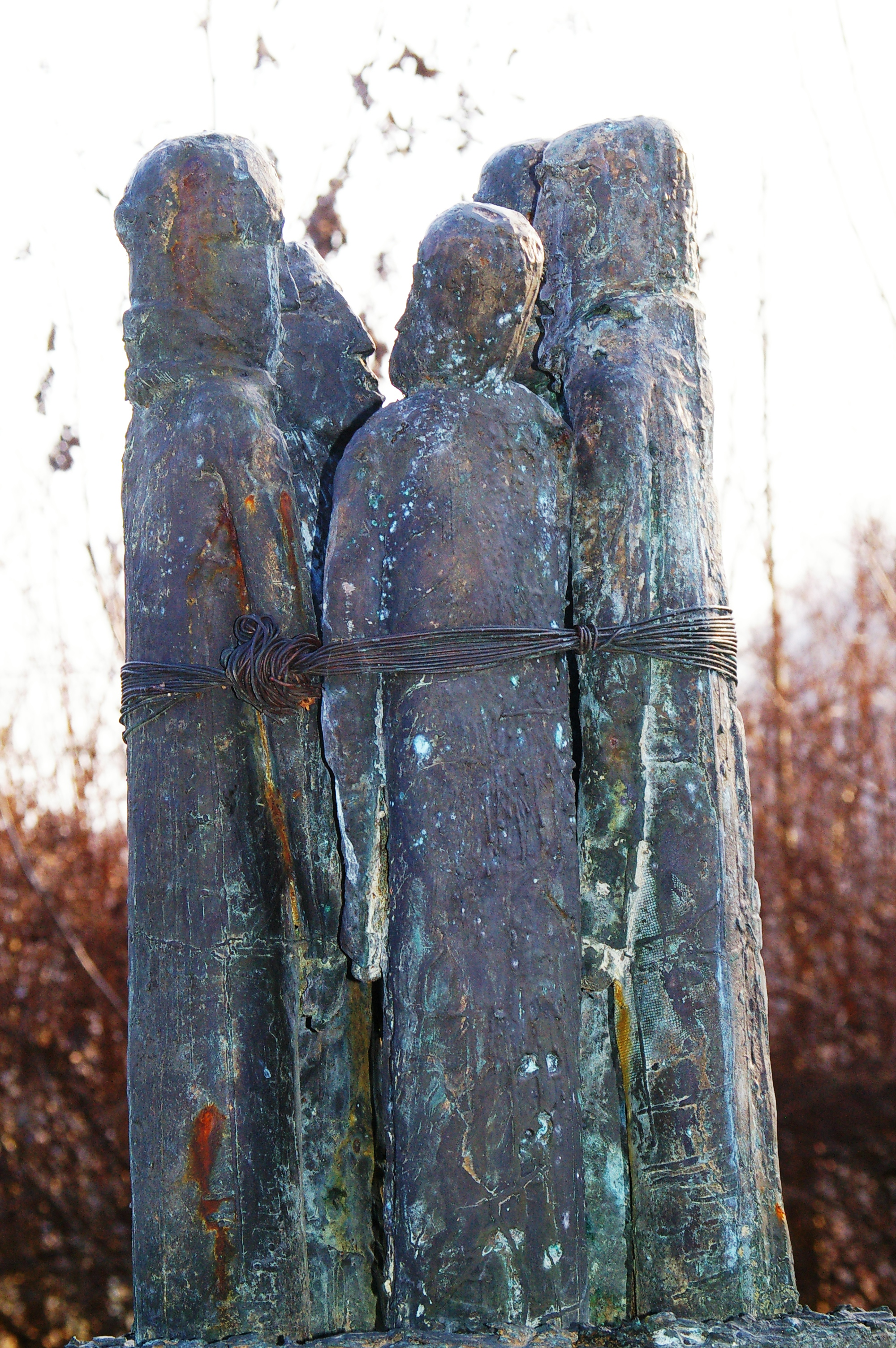
Memorial Site sculpture group by Dieter Schmidt (Fridolfing)

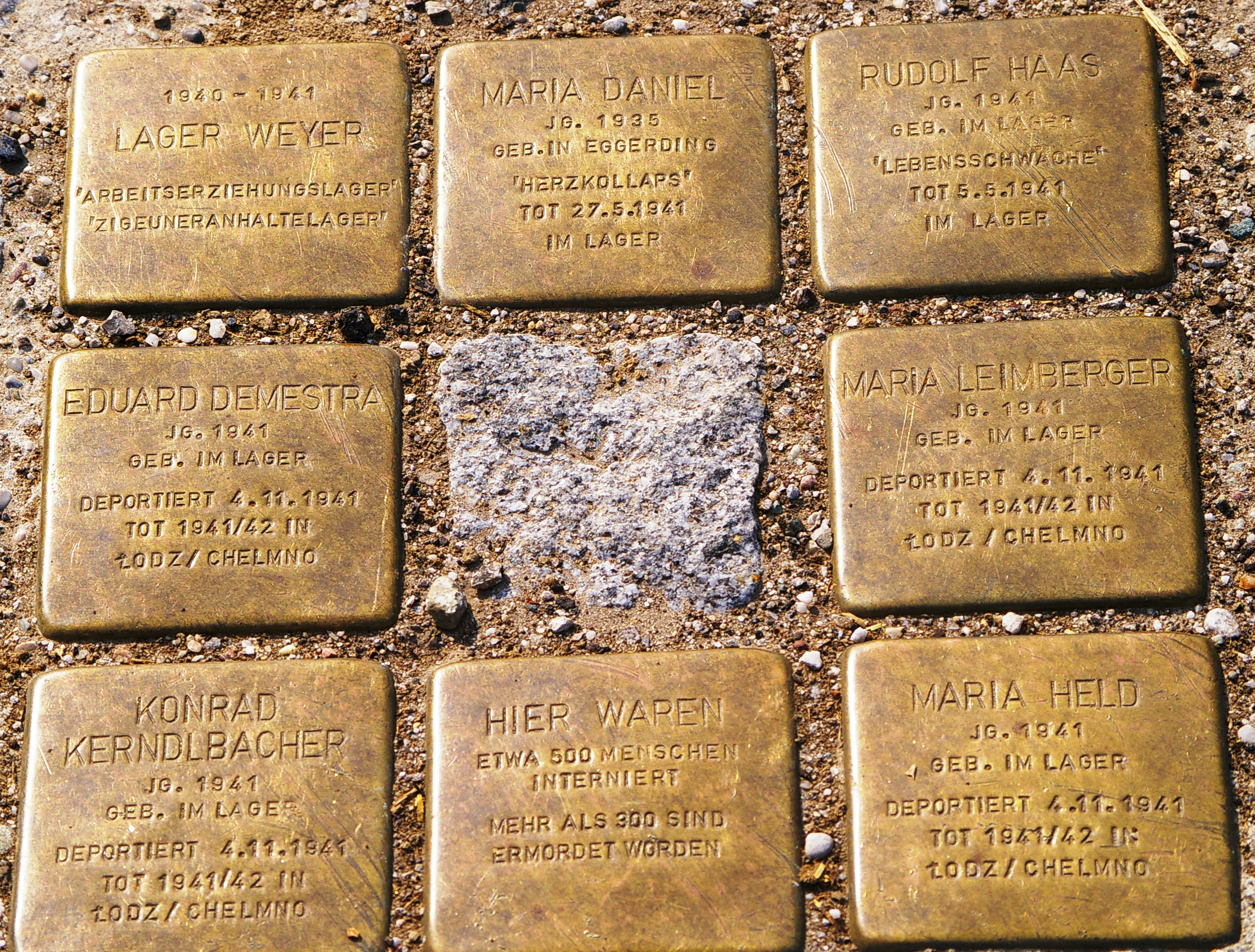
All Stolpersteine, "stumbling blocks"
