= Sándor Wolf =

Hungarian Jewish merchant (1871-1946)

- Born: Nathan Wolf; 21 December 1871; Kismarton, Kingdom of Hungary, Austria-Hungary (now Eisenstadt, Austria)
- Died: 2 January 1946 (aged 74); Haifa, Mandatory Palestine
- Other names: Alexander Wolf; Nathan Wolf
- Occupations: Wine merchant, collector, art collector, museum founder, patron
- Known for: Wolf Museum; co-founder of the Burgenland Regional Museum

Sándor Wolf (German: Alexander Wolf; registered in the Jewish birth register as Nathan Wolf; 21 December 1871 – 2 January 1946) was a Hungarian Jewish wine merchant, collector, patron and museum founder from Kismarton, then in the Kingdom of Hungary within Austria-Hungary and now Eisenstadt, Austria. He belonged to the old Kismarton wine-trading Wolf family and became one of the most important collectors of archaeological, historical and Jewish heritage material in the region later known as Burgenland. His private collection and the Wolf Museum became one of the foundations of the regional museum collection institutionalised in Kismarton in 1926, later the Burgenland Regional Museum (Landesmuseum Burgenland).

Wolf's collecting activity was closely connected with the Jewish heritage of Kismarton, the Siebengemeinden and the wider Hungarian Jewish cultural world. He collected documents, ritual objects, family papers, books, archaeological finds and works of art, and helped preserve the material memory of the Kismarton Jewish quarter. After the Anschluss in 1938, Wolf was persecuted as a Jew: he was arrested by the Gestapo, dispossessed, forced to surrender his collection and driven into exile. He fled via Italy to Mandatory Palestine, where he died in Haifa in 1946. In a letter written from Haifa in 1945, he described the destruction of his family, business and social world during the Holocaust, including the murder and deportation of relatives and close friends in Hungary, and stated that neither he nor his nephew wished to return to Austria except under financial necessity.

== Names ==
The Österreichisches Biographisches Lexikon gives his name as “Wolf, Sándor (Alexander, Nathan)”. A genealogy article based on the Jewish birth registers of Kismarton notes that the register contains an entry for “Nathan Wolf” dated 30 December 1871, with Ignaz Wolf and Hermine Neubrunn as parents. The article suggests that the date may refer to the circumcision rather than the actual birth date, while identifying Nathan as Wolf's Jewish name. In Hungarian-language sources he was generally referred to as Wolf Sándor; in German-language contexts the form Alexander Wolf was also used.

== Life and family background ==
Wolf was born in Kismarton, then in the Kingdom of Hungary, as the son of the wine merchant Ignaz Wolf and Hermine Wolf, née Neubrunn. His father headed Leopold Wolf's Söhne, a wine-wholesale business that had grown into one of the important firms of its kind in the Habsburg monarchy.

The Wolf family belonged to the old, prosperous and publicly active Jewish families of Kismarton. A local Hungarian report from 1898 mentioned Sándor Wolf as a member of the firm Wolf Lipót fiai and described the family as enjoying general esteem in the town.

Wolf attended the Commercial Academy in Vienna and was later an extraordinary student of art history at the University of Vienna. In 1901 he took over the paternal firm together with his brother.

== Wine trade ==
The Wolf family wine business, Leopold Wolf's Söhne, traced its origins to the late eighteenth century. According to a 1922 article in Borászati Lapok, the firm was founded in Kismarton around 1790 by Joachim Wolf, primarily to connect the wines of western Hungary with Vienna and western markets.

During the nineteenth century the firm sold Hungarian wines to Vienna, Bohemia and Moravia, Austrian and Prussian Silesia, southern Germany and Russian Poland. The name Leopold Wolf's Söhne dated from the 1850s, when Leopold Wolf's sons Adolf and Ignatz joined the business as partners. From 1901 the owners of the firm were Ernő Wolf, the elder Lipót Wolf and Sándor Wolf.

The firm also participated in the reconstruction of local vineyards after the phylloxera crisis. The 1922 account stated that it planted vines grafted onto American rootstock and owned vineyards in Ruszta, Kismarton, Darázsfalva, Újléta, Debrecen and Mád.

The Wolf cellars were themselves a local sight. A 1912 report from Sopron stated that the cellars of the firm extended under eight houses in three streets of Kismarton and held more than a thousand barrels, including a large barrel of 843 hectolitres.

== Archaeology and collecting ==
Wolf's interest in archaeology was shaped in part by a business-related study trip to Dalmatia. According to László Koncsek, the family firm sent him there as a young man to study the handling of coastal wines, but Wolf spent much of his time in Spalato, today Split, where large-scale excavations were then taking place. After his return to Kismarton in 1901, he leased the so-called Gölbesäcker field on the outskirts of the town and had it excavated because Roman antiquities were often brought to the surface there by ploughing.

The Österreichisches Biographisches Lexikon adds that, around the same time, the acquisition of a Roman denarius helped ignite his passion for collecting. Contemporary newspapers reported on his archaeological work from the early twentieth century. In 1903, Magyar Szó wrote that Wolf had begun excavations south of the park of the military lower secondary school in Kismarton and that, after a few days of work, the walls of a Roman bath had been uncovered.

According to Koncsek, Wolf entrusted the excavation of the Gölbesäcker field to Lajos Bella, a teacher and archaeologist from Sopron. The material uncovered there became one of the archaeological foundations of the later Wolf Museum.

Wolf was also connected with archaeological institutions in Sopron County. A 1903 report on the general meeting of the Sopron County and Sopron Archaeological Society recorded his presence and mentioned him among those who actively supported archaeology in Kismarton. A 1905 report stated that Wolf had organised excavations in Kismarton and Szárazvám and had sent photographs of the excavated graves to the society.

His collection also appeared in wider Hungarian cultural contexts. In 1914, Vasárnapi Újság identified a painted barrel head in the historical section of a wine and cellar-equipment exhibition as belonging to Sándor Wolf in Kismarton.

== Wolf Museum ==
Wolf's private collection was already a recognised Kismarton attraction in the 1910s. A 1912 portrait in Múlt és Jövő referred to the Wolf Museum and Wolf Library as already functioning institutions and described Wolf as making the Jewish past of Kismarton, local archives and the material remains of the disappearing Jewish quarter accessible to scholars, artists and writers.

According to the present-day Landesmuseum Burgenland, Wolf made his private collection publicly accessible in the former Leinner House. In 1926, after his appointment as honorary regional conservator, he made the former Leinner House available for the establishment of the Burgenland Regional Museum. The Österreichisches Biographisches Lexikon likewise states that Wolf was appointed honorary regional conservator for Burgenland in 1925 and was a co-founder of the Burgenland Regional Museum in 1926.

The collection was based on Wolf's archaeological excavations, local-history and art collecting, and the material and written heritage of the Jewish communities of Kismarton and western Hungary. Contemporary accounts mentioned prehistoric and Roman finds, Greek and Italian antiquities, ornamental vessels, Celtic and Roman coins, medieval decorative arts, old books, Haydn memorabilia, Jewish historical documents and art objects as part of the collection.

The museum was one of the sights visited by travellers to Kismarton. A 1911 excursion report from Sopron described a visit to Wolf's collection at Alsókismartonhegy and emphasised the order of the collection and the expertise of its owner. A 1912 account called Wolf's “beautiful and rich museum” one of the highlights of a Kismarton excursion and stated that the owner personally guided visitors with expert explanations.

After the creation of Burgenland, Wolf extended the scope of his collecting to the history of the new Austrian province and especially to the Jewish history of the region. The already existing Wolf collection and private museum became an important basis for the regional museum collection institutionalised in Kismarton/Eisenstadt in 1926, later the Burgenland Regional Museum.

By around 1930, the museum holdings comprised about 6,000 objects, with a focus on archaeology, art and applied arts, and Judaica. Another account states that by 1932, without counting the archaeological items, the collection already comprised more than 5,800 objects. The collection continued to grow, notably with purchases from a major auction at Plankenwarth Castle (Schloss Plankenwarth).

The museum also had significant Haydn and Fanny Elssler holdings. A 1933 article in Pesti Tőzsde mentioned valuable Haydn relics and letters and other memorabilia of Fanny Elssler in the Wolf Museum. In 1935, the art historian Endre Csatkai wrote in Színházi Élet that the surprise of the Viennese Elssler exhibition had been the material of the Wolf Museum, collected by Sándor Wolf over three decades and surpassing the Viennese and foreign collections in richness.

Csatkai was closely connected with the Wolf Museum. Contemporary press reports referred to him as a guide, curator or organiser of exhibitions associated with the museum; in 1937, for example, he organised an Akiva Eger memorial exhibition there.

== Preservation of Jewish heritage in Kismarton ==
Wolf played an important role in preserving the material and written heritage of the Jewish quarter of Kismarton, the local Jewish community and the Siebengemeinden. The 1912 portrait in Múlt és Jövő described him as founding and maintaining a museum and library, organising excavations, enabling scholars to study the Kismarton archives, encouraging artists to record the endangered remains of the Jewish quarter, and marking buildings connected with local Jewish history with marble plaques.

According to the same portrait, Wolf collected the documents, business books, tax books, guild charters, objects and family papers of the Kismarton Jewish community. The article specifically mentioned the Wolf Museum, the Wolf Library and an iron archive in which documents relating to the community's past were preserved.

In the 1912 Kismarton issue of Múlt és Jövő, Wolf himself published an essay entitled A kismartoni gettó művészete (“The Art of the Kismarton Ghetto”). The essay discussed the artistic and decorative heritage of Jewish houses, interiors, synagogue objects and domestic objects in Kismarton, and stressed the need to locate, describe and preserve Jewish art objects in Hungary.

A 1912 review in the Sopron newspaper Sopron wrote that Wolf had “discovered” the art of the Kismarton Jewish quarter for writers, artists and scholars. The article praised his accompanying texts for presenting the centuries-old life and material culture of the Jews of Kismarton in a clear and sober manner.

In 1922, Múlt és Jövő published Aladár Fürst's review of a work on the gravestones of the old Jewish cemetery of Kismarton. The article presented Wolf as a patron whose support made possible the scholarly documentation of the Jewish heritage of Kismarton.

In 1930, the Hungarian Jewish newspaper Egyenlőség reported that the Burgenland authorities had placed the Kismarton Jewish Street under monument protection, together with its buildings and traditions.

In 1931, Múlt és Jövő referred to Wolf as a state conservator and archaeological adviser appointed by the Austrian government. The same report stated that Wolf had marked the birthplace of Rabbi Akiva Eger in the Kismarton Jewish Street with a marble plaque and planned to establish an Eger room containing the archive of the Kismarton Jewish community and historical documents of the Seven Communities.

A later Akiva Eger memorial exhibition was also held in the Wolf Museum. According to a 1937 article in Múlt és Jövő, the exhibition was arranged by Endre Csatkai and brought together relics, works, manuscripts and family memorabilia connected with Eger.

Wolf also took part in the protection of ritual objects from the Kismarton synagogue. In 1935, Hétfő reported that, at Wolf's initiative, the synagogue treasury had been placed in a compartment protected against burglary and fire. When rumours spread that a valuable glass cup had entered the art trade, Wolf, described by the paper as a conservator of Jewish monuments in Burgenland, inspected the treasury together with Csatkai and established that the object was still intact.

In 1930/31, Wolf began establishing a Jewish Central Archive for Burgenland, working with Leopold Moses and Karl Halaunbrenner.

== Patronage and public activity ==
Wolf supported local historical, educational and charitable initiatives in Kismarton. According to a 1903 report in Sopron, carriages provided by Sándor Wolf, described as a wine merchant, waited for a group of about thirty members of the Transdanubian Tourist Association at Szárazvám. In Kismarton the group was received by several leaders of the local section then being organised.

Wolf also supported the preservation of other local historical memories. In 1931, he marked the former Kismarton residence of Ferenc Bizonfy with a memorial plaque. According to Soproni Hírlap, Wolf delivered the memorial speech at the unveiling, while Bizonfy's biography was written by Endre Csatkai.

Wolf supported the educational and cultural institutions of the Kismarton Jewish community. A 1907 report stated that the foundations of the new building of the Kismarton Jewish school had been created by the Wolf family through financial and land donations.

In 1916, Egyenlőség reported that, thanks to Wolf, pupils of the Kismarton Israelite elementary school had received one Hungarian acre of land for practical agricultural work as early as 1914. The children cultivated garden produce, sold the surplus and used the income to expand the school library.

In 1917, Múlt és Jövő reported that Sándor Wolf of Kismarton had donated 500 crowns to the Hungarian Jewish Museum and described him as a well-known generous patron of cultural causes.

Wolf also took part in local charitable life. In 1920, he was listed among those who made additional payments at a dance evening held for the benefit of the Kismarton Kindergarten Association.

Wolf had international Jewish connections as well. In 1937, Hétfő reported that Arthur Yellin, deputy mayor of Jerusalem, stayed at Wolf's house in Kismarton and was visiting the town for the third time.

== Literary reception ==
Wolf's museum and household were also encountered by visitors from the German-language literary world. Alma Mahler-Werfel recalled an excursion with Franz Werfel, Schalom Asch and others to the Neusiedler See and Eisenstadt, describing it as a journey to the “former Hungary”.

According to Der Transkribierer, Werfel visited the Wolf Museum after his marriage to Alma Mahler-Werfel and was lastingly impressed by Wolf. In Werfel's later novel fragment Cella oder Die Überwinder, written in 1938/39, the world of the Seven Communities and especially that of the Jews of Eisenstadt is reflected in literary form; the same article identifies Wolf as the model for Baron Jaques Emanuel Weil.

== Persecution, exile and death ==
Early in 1938, Austria was incorporated into Nazi Germany in the Anschluss. Wolf, who was Jewish, was arrested by the Gestapo and forced under coercion to “voluntarily” surrender his assets and his collection. The Österreichisches Biographisches Lexikon states that he had to emigrate in 1938, that his collection was confiscated, later restituted to his heirs and auctioned in Lucerne in 1958.

Together with his sister Frida Löwy-Wolf, Wolf fled via Fiume and Trieste to Mandatory Palestine, where he settled in Haifa. A University of Vienna memorial biography notes that Wolf had continued to attend art-history courses at the university shortly before his persecution and exile.

The fate of the collection after the Nazi takeover became uncertain. In 1939, A Magyar Zsidók Lapja wrote that Wolf had gathered the disappearing communal records, books and objects of the Seven Communities and neighbouring kehillot, but that the museum had become “homeless”. The article stated that it was unclear what had happened to the treasures of the museum, and reported that its library and archive were said to have been used to enrich the Jewish Museum in Munich.

In a letter written from Haifa in the summer of 1945 to Irma and Emilio Stock in Trieste, Wolf wrote that his Austrian wine businesses could not be restored. He described a 150-year-old commercial enterprise as destroyed: wine stocks had disappeared, barrels had probably been burned, customers had died or no longer wanted dealings with Jews, and the largely Jewish staff had been scattered around the world.

In the same letter, Wolf stated that neither he nor his nephew Hans Wolf wished to return to Austria, except if their remaining money ran out and no transferable assets could be recovered from Austria or Hungary. He wrote that love of homeland had been beaten out of them and that they had learned to love their “new-old homeland”.

The letter also recorded extensive Holocaust losses among Wolf's relatives and friends. He wrote that his niece Rosa Schmidek, her husband and her grandson Andris Ney had been murdered in Budapest, although he had sent them Palestinian certificates in June 1943. He also wrote that cousins in Budapest, Győr and Szombathely had been murdered in Pest and that whole families from the provinces had been deported to Auschwitz. He described the deportation of his close friend Dr. Sándor Schwarz, a lawyer from Sopron, as almost the heaviest blow to him.

Wolf also wrote that he had no direct news from Kismarton because the town was under Soviet occupation, but that Dr. Ignaz Friedmann had informed him that his museum was only slightly damaged. If this was true, Wolf hoped that at least parts of the museum might be brought to Haifa, depending on the consent of Austria and the Soviet authorities.

Wolf died in Haifa on 2 January 1946.

== Post-war fate of the collection ==
After Wolf's death, his sister Frida Löwy-Wolf was his principal heir. According to László Koncsek's 1962 account in Soproni Szemle, she had been not only Wolf's heir but also his helper in collecting, and she was especially familiar with the embroidery and lace material in the museum.

Koncsek wrote that Frida Löwy-Wolf first offered the collection to the Austrian government for a modest sum, hoping that it would remain in Kismarton and be united with the provincial museum. Negotiations, however, dragged on for years, and she eventually sold the collection to Galerie Fischer in Lucerne. According to the Österreichisches Biographisches Lexikon, the confiscated collection was later restituted to Wolf's heirs and auctioned in Lucerne in 1958; large parts came to the Burgenland Regional Museum.

The Lucerne auctions dispersed major parts of the collection into the international art trade. Koncsek reported that some Burgenland-related archaeological material, Haydn and Liszt manuscripts and other regionally relevant items were purchased back for Burgenland, but that much of the wider collection was scattered among dealers, private collectors and museums.

== Legacy ==
In Eisenstadt, the historic Wolf-Haus or Wolf-Museum forms part of the Burgenland Regional Museum building. Parts of the former Wolf collection are displayed in the Wolf-Haus section of the museum.

A street in Eisenstadt is named after him as Alexander-Wolf-Gasse. The Wolf family mausoleum is located in the so-called Wolfsgarten in the city's Oberberg quarter.

Wolf is remembered in present-day Burgenland primarily as a founder and patron of the Burgenland Regional Museum. Hungarian and Jewish sources from his own lifetime, however, also present him as a Kismarton and western Hungarian Jewish collector, patron and preserver of the material memory of the local Jewish community, the Seven Communities and the wider Hungarian Jewish cultural sphere.

== Works ==
- Sándor Wolf: A kismartoni gettó művészete. Múlt és Jövő, 1912.
- Sándor Wolf: Die Entwicklung des jüdischen Grabsteines und die Denkmäler des Eisenstädter Friedhofs. In: Bernhard Wachstein, Die Grabschriften des alten Judenfriedhofes in Eisenstadt, 1922.
- Sándor Wolf: Das heutige Eisenstädter Ghetto.
