= Leo Veigelsberg =

Hungarian publicist

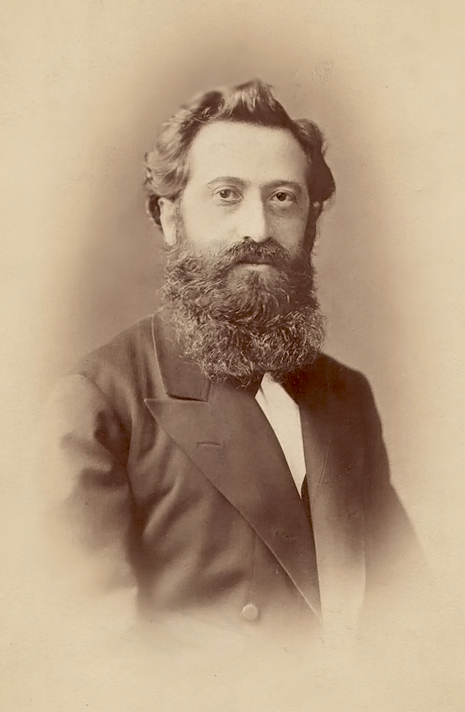
Veigelsberg Leó

Leó Veigelsberg (26 January 1839, in Frauenkirchen – 31 October 1907, in Budapest) was a Hungarian publicist.

Leó Veigelsberg was born at Frauenkirchen, Burgenland and was educated at Kiskőrös, Budapest, and Vienna. For a short time he taught in the Jewish public school in Kecskemét, where he wrote noteworthy political articles for several newspapers, especially the "Politik" of Prague; in 1867 he became a member of the editorial staff of the "Neuer Freier Lloyd," and in 1872 he became editor-in-chief of the Pester Lloyd. His political leaders, usually signed with two asterisks, always attracted great attention. His services as a publicist were recognized by Franz Joseph I, who conferred upon him the decoration of the Order of the Iron Crown (3rd class) on 9 July 1904.

His son Hugó Veigelsberg was a significant author of the subsequent generation.
