= Seven Communities =

Seven Communities may refer to:

- Sette Comuni, seven Cimbrian comuni in Veneto, north-east Italy
- Siebengemeinden, seven former Jewish communities in Eisenstadt, Austria
