= Endre Csatkai =

Hungarian art historian and museologist

- Csatkai Endre
- Born: 13 August 1896; Darufalva, Kingdom of Hungary, Austria-Hungary (now Draßburg, Austria)
- Died: 12 March 1970 (aged 73); Sopron, Hungary
- Other names: Andreas Csatkai; André Csatkai
- Education: Pázmány Péter University; University of Vienna
- Occupations: Art historian, music historian, museologist, museum director, writer, journalist
- Awards: Kossuth Prize (1954)

Endre Csatkai (Hungarian: Csatkai Endre; also appearing in German-language sources as Andreas Csatkai or André Csatkai; 13 August 1896 – 12 March 1970) was a Hungarian art historian, music historian, museologist, museum director, writer and journalist. His career was rooted in the historical west-Hungarian cultural region around Sopron and Kismarton. He was born in Darufalva, a village of former Sopron County located between Sopron and Kismarton, and later worked for years in Kismarton while remaining closely connected with Sopron. His research focused mainly on the monuments, art history, music history and cultural life of Sopron, Kismarton and their surrounding region. He received the Kossuth Prize in 1954 for his work on the monument topography of Sopron and its surroundings.

== Early life and education ==
Csatkai was born in Darufalva, Sopron County, then part of the Kingdom of Hungary, in the multilingual border region between Sopron and Kismarton. Darufalva lay in the same historical county and regional cultural sphere as both towns, which later became central to Csatkai's scholarly and museum work. His father, Ignác Csatkai, was the district physician of Darufalva. Csatkai came from a Jewish family originally named Krausz; Ignác changed the family name from Krausz to Csatkai in 1888. Later accounts emphasise that Endre Csatkai grew up in a multilingual environment, which shaped his later interest in the art, monuments and cultural history of the Sopron–Kismarton region.

He completed his secondary-school studies at the Lutheran Lyceum in Sopron in 1914 and then enrolled at the Faculty of Humanities of Pázmány Péter University in Budapest, where he studied Hungarian and German. His studies were repeatedly interrupted by illness and by the political circumstances of the war and post-war years. Several later biographical accounts connect his Vienna studies with the numerus clausus restrictions then in force at Hungarian universities, but the precise effect of these restrictions on his own studies is unclear. He returned to Budapest before the 1928 amendment of the law and received his doctorate from Pázmány Péter University in 1925. Between 1920/1921 and 1922/1923 he studied art history and history at the University of Vienna, where he attended lectures by Julius von Schlosser, Max Dvořák and Hans Tietze. His dissertation dealt with Ferenc Kazinczy and the visual arts.

== Early journalism and regional art history ==
Already during the First World War, Csatkai published art-historical and museum-related articles in the Sopron press. In 1917 he argued for guided art walks and excursions to regional sites such as Eszterháza, Kismarton and Fraknó, and proposed temporary local exhibitions as a way to develop public taste, collecting and art-historical research. In 1918 he published a series on painters from Sopron and Sopron County, treating the old county as a single cultural region that included towns and villages later divided by the Austrian-Hungarian border.

His early writing also included articles on monument preservation and museum education. In 1920 he contributed to the series Amit el akarnak venni tőlünk with an essay on Kismarton, in which he described the town as part of the endangered west-Hungarian cultural inheritance and already referred to the Wolf Museum as evidence of the Roman-period culture of the town. In 1922 Sopronvármegye announced his daily Soproni Naptár column and described him as a staff member and diligent researcher of Sopron's past.

In the early 1920s Csatkai was a frequent contributor to the Sopron daily press, especially Sopronvármegye, where he published local-historical, art-historical and cultural articles at high frequency. From the mid-1920s his publication activity became less concentrated in the local daily press and increasingly extended to national newspapers and cultural journals. In 1925 he published historical and cultural-historical articles in national Hungarian newspapers, including the Nemzeti Újság and Magyarság, while his art-historical study Canova magyar mecénásai appeared in the national art journal Magyar Művészet.

In October 1925 he organised a public cultural matinée in Sopron with projected images, lectures and musical illustrations. The programme dealt with the Renaissance and Baroque spirit, the three Sopron decades of Kristóf Lackner and a Sopron musical manuscript from 1689. He was also active in the German-language cultural public sphere of Sopron: in 1925 the Oedenburger Zeitung announced a lecture by "Dr. Andreas Csatkai" at the Oedenburger Kunstverein on the old guilds of Sopron.

By the mid-1930s his work had moved further into national cultural journalism. In 1935 the Sopron press reported that the Budapest-based journal Tükör had invited him to become a regular contributor; the notice added that this did not mean that he was leaving Sopron. In 1939 he was admitted to the Journalists' Section of the National Hungarian Press Chamber, reflecting the fact that his work had long extended beyond museum scholarship into journalism and cultural writing.

== Wolf Museum and regional work around Sopron and Kismarton ==
From the mid-1920s Csatkai worked for the private museum and library of the collector and patron Sándor Wolf in Kismarton. This work belonged to his wider activity in the Sopron–Kismarton region, where his birthplace, schooling, museum work and later scholarship all overlapped. His early articles on the art history of his west-Hungarian homeland helped bring him into contact with Wolf. Wolf employed him to catalogue and process his art collection; after a period of convalescence in Italy, Csatkai began working in Kismarton in August 1926 and thereafter spent several months a year there. The Wolf Museum became an important centre of his professional work. By the 1930s the museum had grown to include 26 rooms, including a Haydn memorial room and later a Liszt room.

Csatkai's work in Kismarton also connected him with the commemoration of earlier local intellectuals. In 1931 Sándor Wolf had a memorial plaque placed at his own expense on the former Kismarton residence of Franz Bizonfy, delivered the memorial speech, and Csatkai wrote Bizonfy's biography for the occasion.

The Burgenland provincial museum and heritage-preservation framework was still in formation during these years. A 1926 contemporary account of the newly opened Landesmuseum in Eisenstadt stated that its origins went back only a few years and credited the understanding of several members of the Burgenland provincial government and the initiative of Alexander Wolf. Wolf made a building belonging to his firm, the Wolf-Leiner property near the Esterházy palace, available to the provincial government free of charge. Csatkai's work in Kismarton and on the Eisenstadt-Rust monument topography therefore belonged to this emerging museum and heritage-preservation activity rather than to a long-established Burgenland institutional framework. Together with the Viennese art historian Dagobert Frey, he contributed to the Austrian monument-topography volume Die Denkmale des politischen Bezirkes Eisenstadt und der Freien Städte Eisenstadt und Rust, published as part of the Österreichische Kunsttopographie series in 1932.

In the late 1920s and 1930s Csatkai became an active contributor to the emerging Burgenland scholarly and museum milieu. His studies appeared in Burgenland periodicals devoted to local history, monument preservation and museum work, including articles on Eisenstadt cemetery art, the musical culture of Eisenstadt, Haydn-related material in the Wolf Collection and Liszt iconography.

Contemporary Burgenland reviews also treated his research on Sopron as relevant for Burgenland. A 1931 review of his book on Sopron goldsmiths described him as a well-known art historian through his Eisenstadt research and emphasised the presence of Sopron goldsmiths' works in several Burgenland localities. In 1934 the Sopron county archive recorded that Csatkai, described as an art historian, had donated interesting Kismarton printed materials to the archive.

In 1928 he helped prepare the Sopron special issue of the journal Magyar Művészet. In Kismarton he organised a Joseph Haydn exhibition in 1932 and a Franz Liszt exhibition in 1936. He published in both Hungarian and Austrian periodicals, including Magyar Művészet, Soproni Szemle, Burgenländische Heimatblätter and the Mitteilungen des Burgenländischen Heimatschutzvereins.

Csatkai also used national cultural periodicals to present material from the Wolf Museum. In 1935 he published an illustrated article in Színházi Élet on Fanny Elssler's connections with Kismarton, based on the Wolf Museum's Elssler collection. The article described the museum's Elssler room as preserving the local cult of the dancer, whose family had long-standing ties to Kismarton. The Wolf Museum also formed part of a wider Jewish historical and archival project in Kismarton. Contemporary Jewish press coverage described Wolf's creation of the Jüdisches Zentralarchiv für das Burgenland, established with the consent of the Bundesdenkmalamt to collect records from the former Seven Communities of western Hungary/Burgenland.

Csatkai was also involved in the Haydn memorial work in Eisenstadt. At the formal opening of the newly arranged Haydn Museum in the former house of Joseph Haydn in Eisenstadt in 1935, contemporary press reports listed Csatkai among those thanked for their contribution to the establishment of the museum.

== Return to Sopron and the Second World War ==
After the Anschluss in March 1938, Csatkai's work in Kismarton and the Wolf Museum milieu came to an abrupt end. According to later biographical accounts, as a Jew he left Burgenland hurriedly to avoid possible arrest and, as he also held Hungarian citizenship, returned to Sopron, which became his permanent professional centre thereafter. Contemporary Jewish press accounts from 1939 described the Wolf Museum as having lost its original function after 1938, and reported uncertainty over the fate of its collections, library and archive.

During the interwar years Csatkai had largely worked as a freelance scholar and writer, supporting himself through the Wolf commission, private teaching and publication fees. In Sopron he continued his monument-topographical work, visiting monuments in the town and county, collecting local and archival data, and later publishing material on the monuments of Sopron County at his own expense.

In 1938 Csatkai converted to Catholicism, but the anti-Jewish laws in Hungary continued to affect him. During the Second World War he was called up for labour service, a form of unarmed military service in the Royal Hungarian Army to which Jewish men and other groups excluded from regular armed service were assigned. Before his call-up, he placed his books and notes for safekeeping in the town archive of Sopron. He passed through several labour-service camps before being liberated near Kópháza, close to Sopron, in a severely weakened condition. His legs had been damaged by frostbite during labour service, which made walking difficult for the rest of his life, and his hearing was also seriously impaired.

== Sopron Museum and later career ==
After the war Csatkai resumed scholarly work almost immediately. He was appointed to the leadership of the Sopron Museum, whose buildings and collections had suffered during the war, and directed the institution until his retirement in 1963. Later accounts describe the appointment as a turning point in his life: it gave him a stable position, official accommodation and regular research opportunities after the precarious freelance years of the interwar period.

Under his direction the activity of the museum expanded considerably. He organised numerous temporary and special exhibitions, many of them based on his own scholarly processing of the material; by his retirement he had prepared 81 special exhibitions. Alongside museum work he also gave public lectures for youth organisations, apprentices, factory workers and schools, and was described by later accounts as an active popular educator.

The archaeologist Gyula László, a close friend of Csatkai, later emphasised his distinctive museological approach. László recalled that Csatkai guided students through Sopron and its museum by bringing old houses, interiors and everyday objects to life through anecdotes, local stories and small material details. In his view, Csatkai was a scholar of minor objects and everyday traces, and the furnished rooms and even the reconstructed tavern in the Sopron Museum reflected this interest in the material culture of daily life.

In 1949 Csatkai obtained a private-docent qualification in art history at the University of Szeged. In 1951 he became a member of the Art History Committee of the Hungarian Academy of Sciences, and in 1952 he received the degree of Candidate of Sciences. In 1954 he and Dezső Dercsényi received the Kossuth Prize for the volume Sopron és környéke műemlékei.

From 1955 until his death he edited the relaunched Soproni Szemle. He recruited contributors, supported younger researchers with archival and bibliographical information, and in some cases helped students financially until they could complete their studies. His scholarly output was extensive: later biographical accounts describe nearly 500 publications, while other summaries refer to around a dozen books, nearly 200 studies and more than a thousand newspaper articles.

Csatkai retired in 1963, partly because the expansion of the museum brought increasing administrative and organisational burdens that became difficult for him in poor health. He did not break his connection with the museum, however, and continued to use his office there for research. In retirement he devoted much of his time to publication and to Soproni Szemle, renewed his Austrian professional contacts, published in specialist journals and gave lectures on Vienna radio. In 1967, on the centenary of the Sopron Museum, he received the Gold Grade of the Order of Merit of Labour for his work in museum affairs, and his art-historical work was also recognised with the Ipolyi Arnold Memorial Medal. Csatkai died in Sopron on 12 March 1970 and was buried in the Old Saint Michael Cemetery there.

== Selected works ==
- Szépítő törekvések Sopron múltjában. Sopron, 1921.
- A soproni muzsika története. Sopron, 1925.
- Canova magyar mecénásai. Magyar Művészet, 1925.
- A XIX. század soproni festészetének és a Soproni Képzőművészeti Kör történetének vázlata. Sopron, 1927.
- A Soproni Városszépítő Egyesület évkönyve és története, 1869–1929. Sopron, 1929.
- Soproni ötvösök a XV–XIX. században. Sopron, 1931.
- Die Denkmale des politischen Bezirkes Eisenstadt und der Freien Städte Eisenstadt und Rust. Vienna, 1932. With Dagobert Frey.
- Sopron környékének műemlékei. Sopron, 1932.
- Régi soproni házak, régi soproni családok. Sopron, 1936.
- Idegenek a régi Sopronról. Sopron, 1938.
- Petőfi Sopronban. Sopron, 1948.
- Sopron és környéke műemlékei. Budapest, 1953. Edited with Dezső Dercsényi.
- Sopron. Budapest, 1954.
- A soproni képzőművészet története, 1848–1948. Sopron, 1962.
- Kazinczy és a képzőművészetek. Budapest, 1983.

== Legacy ==
Csatkai's private library, correspondence and research materials entered the collection of the Liszt Ferenc Museum in Sopron after his death. His grave was declared protected by the National Committee for Memorials and Piety in 2004.

The Csatkai Endre Prize was established for young researchers of the history of Sopron and was first awarded in 1973. A street in Sopron has borne his name since 1987, and memorial plaques mark his former home in Sopron and his birthplace in Draßburg.
