= Siebengemeinden =

Seven historic Jewish communities in western Hungary, now Burgenland, Austria

The Siebengemeinden (Hebrew: Sheva Kehillot, שֶבַע קְהִלּוֹת; Hungarian: Hét község or Hét hitközség; English: Seven Communities) were seven historic Jewish communities in western Hungary, in the territory of present-day Burgenland, Austria. Until 1921 the communities belonged to the Kingdom of Hungary and were closely connected with the western Hungarian estates of the Esterházy family. The seven communities were Kismarton / Eisenstadt, Nagymarton / Mattersdorf, later Mattersburg, Kabold / Kobersdorf, Lakompak / Lackenbach, Boldogasszony / Frauenkirchen, Köpcsény / Kittsee and Németkeresztúr or Sopronkeresztúr / Deutschkreutz.

The formation of the communities was connected with several waves of Jewish displacement and resettlement in western Hungary and Central Europe. One early background was the expulsion of Jews from Sopron in the sixteenth century, after which some Jews excluded from the jurisdiction of the royal free town found room to settle on nearby noble estates, especially in the direction of Kismarton/Eisenstadt. A later and decisive factor was the settlement of Jews expelled from Vienna and other Austrian territories around 1670–1671, who found new opportunities in the western counties of the Kingdom of Hungary, especially under Esterházy protection.

The communities were predominantly associated with Orthodox Judaism and maintained synagogues, schools, cemeteries, ritual baths and rabbinical institutions. Their history belongs at once to the history of Hungarian Jewry, the regional history of western Hungary, the Orthodox Jewish religious tradition, and the memory of Jewish life in present-day Burgenland.

== Name ==
The German name Siebengemeinden and the Hebrew name Sheva Kehillot both mean "Seven Communities". In Hungarian the group is known as Hét község or Hét hitközség. The term "community" did not refer merely to seven settlements, but to organised Jewish communal bodies functioning under the legal and social conditions of the early modern and estate-based order.

In the early period Lajtaújfalu / Neufeld an der Leitha was also connected with this group of Jewish settlements. German-language accounts describe Neufeld as an original eighth community that was dissolved by an estate decree in 1739; the expression "Eight Communities" did not become established in the documentary record. From the eighteenth century the name Siebengemeinden therefore referred to the seven remaining Jewish communities under Esterházy protection.

== Meaning of "community" ==
In the context of the Siebengemeinden, the word Gemeinde or község referred not only to a locality but also to an organised Jewish community and congregation. In early modern and estate-based Hungary, communities living on a landlord's estate, including Hungarian, German or Croatian villages, had their own local leaders, internal rules, collective obligations and payments towards the estate. The Jewish communities of the Siebengemeinden functioned within a similar estate framework, but their internal organisation was based on religious and confessional structures.

Jewish communal self-government within such pre-modern frameworks was not unique to the Siebengemeinden. Jewish communities across Central and Eastern Europe commonly had internal leaders and institutions for religious, educational, charitable, disciplinary and fiscal affairs. The distinctive feature of the Siebengemeinden was rather that seven historically connected western Hungarian Jewish communities became institutionalised within the Esterházy estates and were known for generations as a regional group.

The leaders of the Jewish communities dealt both with the estate authorities and with their own community members. Their tasks included the management of collective payments, the maintenance of religious and social institutions, and the handling of internal communal affairs. The Siebengemeinden thus represented not simply seven places where Jews lived, but seven organised Jewish communities operating within the estate-based order, with their own religious and communal institutions.

After the revolutions of 1848 and the decline of feudal-estate structures, this legal and administrative framework lost its original meaning. The Jewish congregations continued to exist as religious and communal institutions, but the term Siebengemeinden increasingly referred to a historical group of communities rather than to a living estate-administrative category.

== The seven communities ==
The Siebengemeinden consisted of the following western Hungarian Jewish communities:

- Kismarton / Eisenstadt – in historic Sopron County; one of the best-known centres of the Siebengemeinden. Its Jewish quarter was the Unterberg, Hungarian Alsókismartonhegy.
- Nagymarton / Mattersdorf, later Mattersburg – in historic Sopron County; an important Orthodox Jewish community and centre of rabbinical learning.
- Kabold / Kobersdorf – in historic Sopron County; its historic Jewish cemetery is one of the surviving remains of the community.
- Lakompak / Lackenbach – in historic Sopron County; a Jewish community connected with the Esterházy estates.
- Boldogasszony / Frauenkirchen – in historic Moson County; one of the northern communities of the group.
- Köpcsény / Kittsee – in historic Moson County; a Jewish community on the western borderland of historic Hungary.
- Németkeresztúr or Sopronkeresztúr / Deutschkreutz – in historic Sopron County; a community with a significant Orthodox Jewish tradition.

== History ==
=== Expulsions from Sopron and Austrian territories ===
The formation of the Siebengemeinden was not the result of a single event, but of several waves of Jewish displacement and resettlement that differed in date, scale and legal context. Among the western Hungarian precedents was the expulsion of Jews from Sopron in the sixteenth century. This took place in the unsettled aftermath of the Battle of Mohács in 1526, when the Kingdom of Hungary entered a period of dynastic conflict and civil war between the supporters of Ferdinand of Habsburg and John Zápolya, while facing the continuing threat of Ottoman expansion. In this environment of political fragmentation, military insecurity and financial strain, Sopron acted to remove its Jewish community, partly in defence of its own urban jurisdiction and financial interests.

In his 1896 history of the Jews of Sopron, Rabbi Miksa Pollák devoted a chapter to "The expulsion of the Jews from Sopron, 1526–1534" and to the later fate of Jews who had fled the town.

The expulsion from Sopron was primarily an exclusion from the jurisdiction of a royal free town. The Jews were driven out of Sopron's urban legal sphere, but they did not necessarily leave the legal-political framework of the Kingdom of Hungary. According to Pollák, some of the Jews who left Sopron fled towards Kis-Marton, that is Kismarton/Eisenstadt. This process can be seen as one of the early western Hungarian precedents of the later Siebengemeinden: Jews excluded from urban jurisdiction found a new framework for communal life on nearby noble estates, especially in the Kismarton region connected with the Esterházy family.

The seventeenth-century expulsions from Austrian territories differed in both scale and legal meaning. After the expulsion of Jews from Vienna and Lower Austria in 1670–1671, several Jewish families did not simply move from one urban jurisdiction to a neighbouring estate, but crossed from the Austrian hereditary lands into the western counties of the Kingdom of Hungary. In the history of the Siebengemeinden, the Sopron precedent is therefore best understood as a local western Hungarian urban-to-estate shift, whereas the Austrian expulsion represented a cross-border wave of flight and resettlement.

The later Siebengemeinden developed against this double background: Jews excluded from western Hungarian towns and Jews expelled from Austrian territories both found opportunities for settlement and communal life on noble estates, especially those of the Esterházy family.

=== Esterházy protection and estate status ===
The growth of the communities was closely tied to Esterházy estate protection. In the conditions of early modern estate society this protection provided a legal and social framework for settlement and communal life. The rights, duties and financial obligations of the Jewish communities were regulated by letters of protection, contracts and estate regulations. This system involved dependence on the landlord, but also gave the communities room to maintain their own religious and communal institutions.

The inhabitants of the communities paid protection fees and other dues to the Esterházy lords. In German-language scholarship they are described as having referred to themselves as Hochfürstlich Esterházy Schutzjuden, or princely Esterházy protected Jews. The term illustrates that, within the estate-based order of the period, dependence on the landlord was also a legally recognised status that provided a framework for settlement and communal life.

The communities had a degree of internal self-government. Their representatives met from time to time in Kismarton/Eisenstadt to discuss, among other matters, the distribution of taxes and payments imposed on the communities and the defence of their legal position. According to the Jewish Virtual Library, the Esterházy letter of protection granted to the Jewish community of Eisenstadt in 1690 was later extended to all seven communities and formed an important basis of their autonomy.

The communities maintained synagogues, cemeteries, schools, ritual baths and rabbinates. They were particularly important in the history of Orthodox Judaism in western Hungary, and several of them developed strong traditions of rabbinical learning.

=== After 1848 ===
The revolutions of 1848 and the abolition of feudal-estate structures transformed not only the Esterházy protection system but also the administrative and social framework in which the Siebengemeinden had originally been meaningful. With the development of modern civil administration, estate-based communities with collective rights and obligations lost their earlier administrative role. The Jewish congregations continued as religious and communal institutions, but the Siebengemeinden as an estate-based community group tied to the Esterházy estates lost its original legal and administrative meaning. The name survived mainly as a historical, religious and memorial term.

Until 1921 the communities were located within the Kingdom of Hungary. Their primary legal, administrative and social framework was therefore Hungarian, although their religious, family and commercial connections extended across the wider Central European Ashkenazi world. After the post-First World War border changes under the Treaty of Trianon and the creation of Burgenland as an Austrian province, the communities became part of Austria in territorial and administrative terms.

== Related southern Jewish communities ==
The Siebengemeinden are often distinguished from Jewish communities that developed in the area of present-day southern Burgenland, usually under the protection of the Batthyány family. Such communities included Városszalónak / Stadtschlaining, Rohonc / Rechnitz and Németújvár / Güssing. Some Jewish historical summaries also include Felsőpulya / Oberpullendorf and Gáta / Gattendorf in this wider network, although Gattendorf is not geographically part of southern Burgenland and also appears historically in connection with the Esterházy sphere.

These communities did not form part of the Siebengemeinden in the narrow sense of the seven Esterházy-protected communities, but belonged to the wider Jewish settlement network of western Hungary and later Burgenland. According to the Jewish Virtual Library, Neufeld, Gattendorf, Güssing, Rechnitz, Rust and Schlaining were also significant Jewish communities in the region, while the community of Sopron, under Hungarian administration, maintained close links with the Seven Communities.

== Hungarian institutional and archival context ==
The history of the Siebengemeinden is preserved to a significant extent in Hungarian archival, communal and administrative contexts. The Magyar–Zsidó Oklevéltár published documents relating to the Seven Communities and their connection with the city of Sopron and the Jewish population of Sopron. A review in Levéltári Közlemények described the relevant volume as containing material on Kismarton, Nagymarton, Kabold, Lakompak, Sopronkeresztúr, Boldogasszony and Köpcsény, including legal and municipal records from the period 1600–1740.

Nineteenth-century Jewish vital records from several of the communities also appear in Hungarian archival inventories. An inventory of microfilmed church and religious registers lists, among others, Jewish registers for Köpcsény from 1835 to 1895, Lakompak from 1833 to 1895, and Nagymarton from 1827 to 1895.

The communities and their rabbis also appear in the records of Hungarian Jewish national institutions. The registers of the National Israelite Office include, for example, references to matters concerning Nagymarton, Lakompak and Köpcsény, illustrating the continued connection of the communities with Hungarian Jewish institutional administration in the late nineteenth and early twentieth centuries.

The Hungarian context of the Siebengemeinden is also visible in their rabbinical, family and confessional links. For several generations the communities belonged to the institutional and religious network of Hungarian Orthodox Jewry, while their geographical position also connected them with Vienna, Pressburg/Pozsony, Pest and other Central European Jewish centres.

== Religious and cultural significance ==
The Siebengemeinden were one of the important centres of Orthodox Jewish life in western Hungary. Their communal life was shaped by traditional Ashkenazi institutions, including synagogues, cemeteries, schools, ritual baths, charitable institutions and rabbinates. Several of the communities were known for their rabbis and yeshivas. Nagymarton/Mattersdorf and Németkeresztúr/Deutschkreutz were especially important centres of Orthodox learning.

The cultural and linguistic world of the communities was multilingual. Hebrew and Yiddish were central in religious life; German and regional German dialects were important in everyday life; and Hungarian became increasingly present in administration and public life during the nineteenth century. By the late nineteenth and early twentieth centuries the communities also participated in Hungarian state, administrative, press and Jewish institutional frameworks.

=== Rabbis and rabbinical connections ===
Several important Orthodox rabbis were connected with the Siebengemeinden. Moses Sofer, known as the Hatam Sofer, served as rabbi in Nagymarton before becoming the leading rabbinical authority of Pressburg/Pozsony. Kismarton was associated with figures such as Samson Wertheimer, Meir Eisenstadt, Akiva Eger and Azriel Hildesheimer. Kabold was connected with Abraham Zwebner, and Lakompak with Shalom Ullmann.

The rabbinical families of the communities were not only local figures but formed part of wider Hungarian and Central European Jewish networks. A local information board at the Jewish cemetery of Kabold/Kobersdorf mentions several local religious figures, including Rabbi Samuel Chajim, who died in 1792, Rabbi David Alt, also known as Eibnitz, who died in 1830, and Rabbi Elieser Wolf Alt, who died in 1895. The same board states that the wife of Rabbi David Alt was the daughter of Rabbi Moshe Kunitz, a well-known dayan of Pest. This family connection illustrates links between the rabbinical families of Kabold and one of the major Jewish religious centres of the Kingdom of Hungary.

== Notable people and associated families ==
Several religious, cultural and public figures were connected with the Siebengemeinden and the wider western Hungarian Jewish settlement network. Joseph Joachim (Hungarian: Joachim József), violinist, conductor and composer, was born in Köpcsény/Kittsee and became one of the leading figures of nineteenth-century European musical life. Karl Goldmark (Hungarian: Goldmark Károly) is also often mentioned in the wider musical and cultural memory of western Hungarian Jewry, although he was born in Keszthely rather than in one of the Seven Communities.

Sándor Wolf was a Jewish collector and museum founder from Kismarton/Eisenstadt whose collection played an important role in preserving Jewish and regional material heritage in Burgenland. Julius Deutsch, an Austrian Social Democratic politician and state secretary for military affairs in the First Austrian Republic, was born in Lakompak/Lackenbach.

Hebrew-language Jewish memorial literature also connects further persons with the Seven Communities or the wider Jewish environment of Burgenland. These include Avigdor Esch, a writer born in Kismarton/Eisenstadt; Moshe Shmuel Neuman, a Hungarian poet; Moritz Benedikt, a neurologist and professor in Vienna; and the father of Alfred Adler, who was connected with the community of Köpcsény/Kittsee.

== The Holocaust and the end of the communities ==
After the Anschluss of Austria in 1938, the situation of the Jews of Burgenland deteriorated rapidly. An important role in the Nazi transformation of Burgenland was played by Tobias Portschy, a National Socialist politician from the southern Burgenland region, historically part of the multi-ethnic western Hungarian borderland. Portschy had served as illegal Gauleiter of Burgenland from 1935 to 1938 and headed the Burgenland provincial government from March to October 1938. The liquidation of Jewish life in Burgenland was particularly rapid: community members were expelled, property was confiscated or "Aryanised", and many were forced to Vienna, from where they later faced further persecution, emigration or deportation.

The communal and religious life of the communities came to an end; their synagogues, houses, cemeteries and material heritage were destroyed, damaged or dispersed. Of the former synagogues, only a few remains survived, including the building of the synagogue in Kobersdorf and a private synagogue preserved in the Austrian Jewish Museum in Eisenstadt.

The destruction of the Siebengemeinden meant not only the disappearance of local Jewish congregations, but also the end of a centuries-old western Hungarian Jewish social and religious world. Local Orthodox Jewish continuity in these communities was essentially broken after 1938.

== Memory and heritage ==
The memory of the Siebengemeinden is today preserved primarily in Burgenland, through Austrian museums, local history projects and Jewish heritage institutions. This creates a particular memorial situation: the surviving cemeteries, buildings and sites are located in Austria, while the pre-1921 history of the communities belongs to the Kingdom of Hungary and to the history of Hungarian Jewry, especially Hungarian Orthodox Jewry.

Although Orthodox Jewish religious life exists in Austria today, it is concentrated mainly in Vienna and does not represent a direct local institutional continuation of the former Orthodox communities of Burgenland. In interpreting the Siebengemeinden, it is therefore necessary to distinguish between present-day Austrian Jewish institutional life and the interrupted local tradition of the historic western Hungarian Orthodox communities.

The communities occupy a border position in institutional memory. Their surviving cemeteries, buildings and memorial sites are maintained and interpreted primarily within Austrian and Burgenland frameworks. Historically, however, their archival material, communal connections, rabbinical tradition and pre-1921 legal-administrative context are closely connected with Hungarian Jewry and especially with the history of Hungarian Orthodox Judaism. For this reason, Hungarian Orthodox Jewish institutional and memorial contexts are important for the interpretation of the Siebengemeinden.

The visibility of the Hungarian language and the Hungarian historical context is also an issue in the presentation of the communities. Until the early twentieth century the Siebengemeinden functioned within Hungarian state, administrative and Jewish institutional frameworks, and by the turn of the twentieth century parts of the communities were connected with Hungarian-language public life. In many present-day memorial, museum and local historical presentations in Burgenland, however, the Hungarian language is less visible than German, Hebrew or English interpretive frameworks. This can make the Hungarian Jewish historical context of the Siebengemeinden less apparent in the contemporary memorial landscape.

The memory of the Siebengemeinden also survived in Israel. In Jerusalem, the name of the Haredi neighbourhood Kiryat Sheva Kehillot, meaning "Seven Communities", preserves the memory of the group. In practice, the names Kiryat Mattersdorf and Kiryat Unsdorf are especially used. In Hebrew-language Jewish memory the Siebengemeinden appear primarily as an Orthodox religious and rabbinical tradition, partly differing from Hungarian administrative and confessional-historical approaches.

== Sándor Wolf ==
Sándor Wolf was a Jewish wine merchant, collector and museum founder from Kismarton/Eisenstadt. His collection included archaeological, artistic, applied-art and Judaica objects, and played an important role in the formation of the Burgenland provincial museum collection.

Wolf is significant for the memory of the Siebengemeinden because his collecting and museum work connected local Jewish heritage, western Hungarian regional history and the preservation of material culture before the destruction of the communities. After the Anschluss in 1938 his property was confiscated, and he fled to Palestine, where he died in 1946.

Wolf's work is one of the key points in the Hungarian and Burgenland memory history of the Siebengemeinden. Through his museum and collecting activity he helped preserve material and archival traces that are important for the study of the family, religious and regional networks of the communities.

== Census data ==
According to the 1910 Hungarian census, the following numbers of inhabitants were recorded as belonging to the Israelite religion in settlements connected with the Siebengemeinden. In the Hungarian census context this was a religious-confessional category, not an ethnic nationality category.

- Alsókismartonhegy / Unterberg, now part of Eisenstadt: 276 inhabitants of the Israelite religion, 79.3% of the local population
- Lakompak / Lackenbach: 464 inhabitants of the Israelite religion, 27.8%
- Kabold / Kobersdorf: 256 inhabitants of the Israelite religion, 20.2%
- Sopronkeresztúr / Deutschkreutz: 621 inhabitants of the Israelite religion, 18.6%
- Boldogasszony / Frauenkirchen: 412 inhabitants of the Israelite religion, 15.1%
- Nagymarton / Mattersdorf, now Mattersburg: 511 inhabitants of the Israelite religion, 13.5%
- Kismarton / Eisenstadt: 168 inhabitants of the Israelite religion, 5.5%
- Felsőkismartonhegy / Oberberg, now part of Eisenstadt: 58 inhabitants of the Israelite religion, 4.4%
- Köpcsény / Kittsee: 92 inhabitants of the Israelite religion, 2.9%

This distinction is important because Hungarian census practice separated religious affiliation from nationality or mother tongue. In the Hungarian context, including later Hungarian usage, Jewish religious affiliation and national or linguistic identity were distinct categories rather than automatically identical ones.

== See also ==
- History of the Jews in Hungary
- History of the Jews in Austria
- Orthodox Judaism
- Oberlander Jews
- Austrian Jewish Museum
- Kiryat Mattersdorf
