= Ignotus =

Hungarian editor and writer

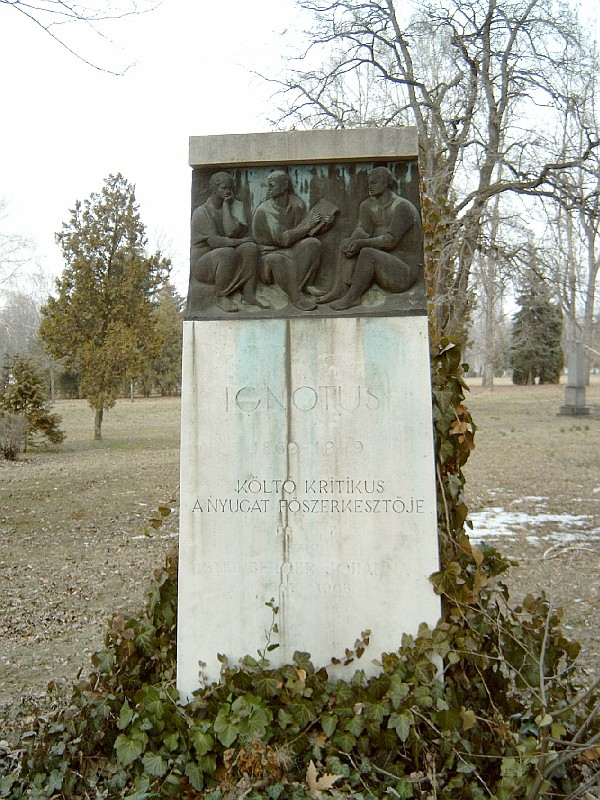
Grave of Ignotus, born Hugó Veigelsberg, in Budapest, Kerepesi Cemetery: 24/1-2-72.

Hugó Veigelsberg (2 November 1869, Pest – 3 August 1949, Budapest) was a Hungarian editor and writer who usually published under the pen name Ignotus (Latin for "unknown"). He was known for the lyric individuality of his poems, stories, and sociological works. In addition to "Ignotus", he also wrote under the pseudonyms "Dixi," "Pató Pál," and "Tar Lorincz".

His works include A Slemil Keservei (1891), Versek (1894), Vallomások (1900), and Végzet, a translation of a novel by the Dutch author Louis Couperus. He also founded the literary magazine Nyugat. His father was the journalist Leó Veigelsberg, and his son Pál (Paul) Ignotus (1901–1978) was a journalist and writer who worked for the BBC during World War II.
