= Franz Bizonfy =

Hungarian physician and lexicographer

Franz Bizonfy (Hungarian: Bizonfy Ferenc; originally Franz Maschitz; 12 March 1828 – 19 August 1912) was a Hungarian physician, writer, linguist, lexicographer and former Honvéd officer of the Hungarian Revolution of 1848–49, of Croatian descent.

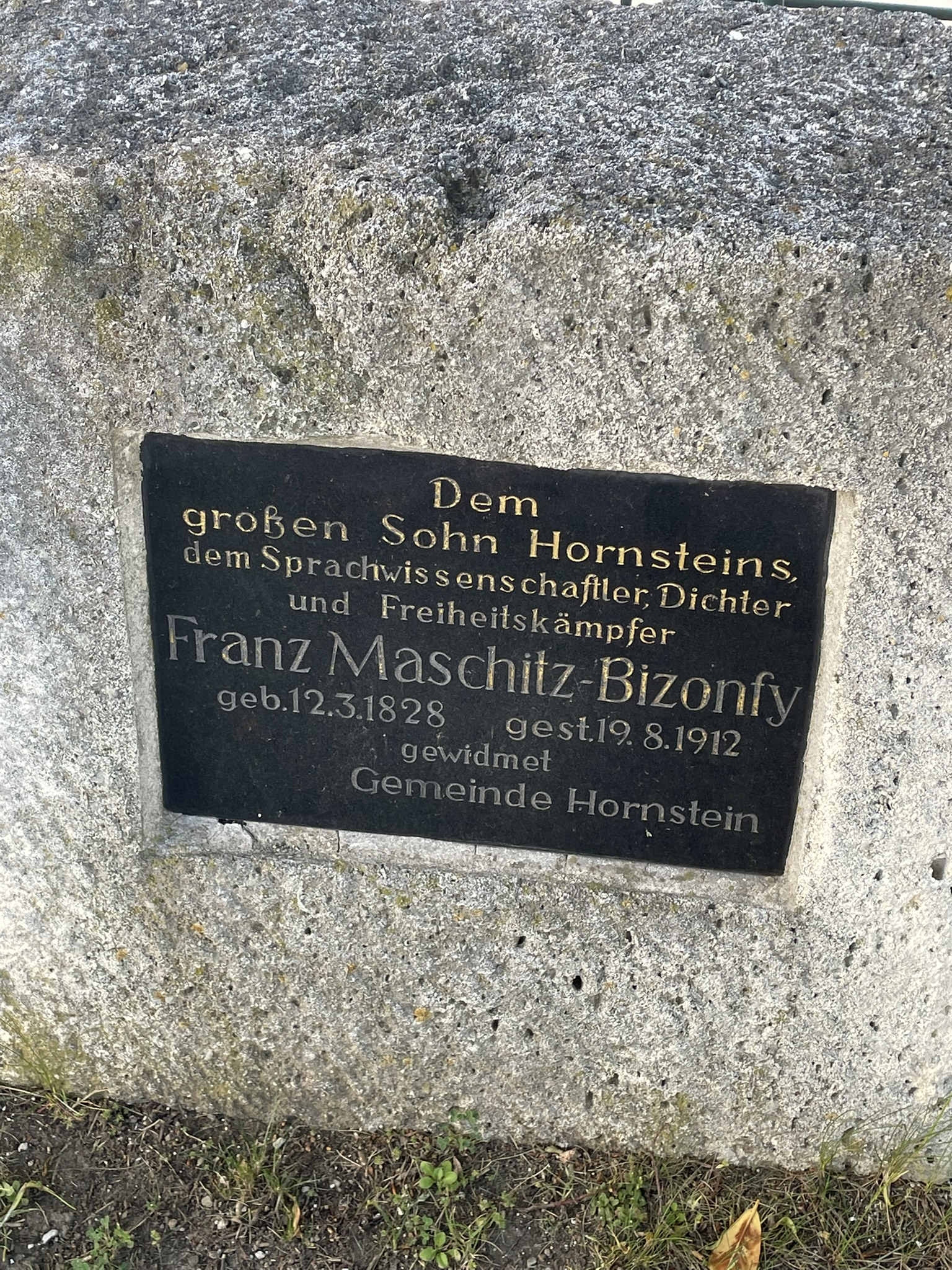
Memorial plaque of Franz Maschitz-Bizonfy in Szarvkő

== Life ==
Bizonfy was born as Franz Maschitz in Szarvkő, then in the western part of Sopron County in the Kingdom of Hungary. According to a later article by the historian Endre Csatkai, he was born to Croatian parents. He completed his secondary studies in Magyaróvár and Sopron. According to the Österreichisches Biographisches Lexikon, he was originally intended for a theological career, but later turned to medical studies.

During the Hungarian Revolution of 1848–49, Bizonfy served as a Honvéd officer. Csatkai wrote that he was studying medicine in Pest when the revolution reached him, and that he enlisted together with friends from Kismarton and Kishöflány. According to the same account, he rose to the rank of first lieutenant while still a young man. After the defeat at Világos, he chose exile rather than imprisonment or service in the Austrian army.

In 1851 he was in London, where he taught at a military school established for younger refugee Honvéd officers, alongside Bishop Jácint Rónay and Colonel Zsigmond Thaly. The school closed after a few months, after which he continued his studies at the universities of Leipzig, Berlin, Heidelberg and Zurich.

The matriculation records of the University of Zurich state that he enrolled in the Faculty of Law in 1852 and left the university after Easter 1854. The same record identifies him as originating from Hungary and states that he lived in exile between 1848 and 1867 in Germany, Switzerland and England. Its additional biographical information describes him as a writer, a physician in London, and a linguist who published the first Hungarian–English dictionary in 1878.

Contemporary and later accounts connected Bizonfy with European intellectual circles of the mid-nineteenth century. Csatkai's 1938 article states that, while passing through Frankfurt, Bizonfy visited Arthur Schopenhauer, whose work he already knew. The article quotes a letter by Schopenhauer to his friend Frauenstädt in which Schopenhauer described Bizonfy as a tall and handsome young man who appeared to have knowledge of Oriental languages and who claimed that he would spread Schopenhauer's doctrines in Zurich. Csatkai also wrote that Bizonfy came into contact with Richard Wagner, Georg Herwegh and Heinrich Heine.

Bizonfy later moved to Hamburg, where he practised medicine. According to Csatkai, he married Therese Gravenhorst, a wealthy woman who died soon afterwards. He then moved to London, where he continued his medical practice and worked as a writer. According to Szinnyei's biographical lexicon, his articles appeared mainly in foreign newspapers. He wrote cultural-historical leading articles for the English newspaper The Star, which he also edited until the death of Lucas, and his writings were also published in The Times. He also contributed to the Pester Lloyd during Rothfeld's editorship. The Österreichisches Biographisches Lexikon likewise states that he wrote for The Times while living in England.

In London he was also connected with the Beringer family, a German émigré family, and married one of its female members. After the Austro-Hungarian Compromise of 1867, he returned to Hungary with his wife.

After his return, Bizonfy attempted to find a place in Hungarian public and academic life but did not obtain a permanent post. Csatkai wrote that he stood as a parliamentary candidate in Nagymarton but was defeated. According to an anecdote preserved by Csatkai, in one Croatian village his supporters advised him to address the voters in their mother tongue, but the absent-minded Bizonfy spoke to them in English instead.

Bizonfy also hoped for a university position. According to Csatkai, his wife actively supported his efforts and even accused Ferenc Deák of not doing enough on his behalf. Deák replied that the matter depended on the minister of religion and education. After the death of József Eötvös, his successor Ágoston Trefort did not promise an appointment.

According to the Österreichisches Biographisches Lexikon, Bizonfy returned to his homeland in 1867 and later lived in Lorettom (today Loretto), Vimpác (today Wimpassing an der Leitha) and finally Kismarton (today Eisenstadt). Other biographical sources state that he returned in 1868, left the country again and settled in Düsseldorf, where he edited a newspaper for a time, before finally returning to Hungary in the late 1870s.

In Lorettom and Vimpác, Bizonfy worked on linguistic writings, including English–Hungarian grammar and dictionary projects. Csatkai related that a small volume of Bizonfy's aphorisms, published in Pest in the 1870s, later came into the hands of the ruler of Württemberg, who wished to obtain further information about its author. This episode, according to Csatkai, led to Bizonfy's rediscovery after a period of obscurity.

Bizonfy eventually moved to Kismarton, where he lived for about twenty years. Csatkai wrote that his language lessons were in practice broad educational conversations ranging from natural history and poetry to ancient languages and philosophical questions.

As a linguist and lexicographer, Bizonfy became known above all for his Angol–magyar szótár (English–Hungarian Dictionary), published in 1878, and his Magyar–angol szótár (Hungarian–English Dictionary), published in 1881. Austrian biographical literature and the Zurich matriculation record both identify him with the first significant Hungarian–English dictionary.

Bizonfy died in Kismarton on 19 August 1912.

== Commemoration and legacy ==
Bizonfy remained a remembered figure in Kismarton's local civic culture. In 1931, the Soproni Hírlap reported that the collector and patron Sándor Wolf had placed a memorial plaque on the house where Bizonfy had lived. Wolf also delivered the commemorative speech, while Bizonfy's biography was written by Endre Csatkai.

Csatkai's 1927 article stated that Bizonfy's correspondence, library and writings had been deposited in the Wolf Museum in Kismarton and were then being arranged. The same article mentioned a large amount of material relating to Sanskrit. In 1938 Csatkai wrote that Bizonfy's widow had returned to England after her husband's death and had destroyed much of his estate before leaving. The remaining material was deposited in the Wolf Museum; some of the letters addressed to Bizonfy had already been published, while a large body of philosophical and linguistic manuscripts still awaited scholarly processing.

== Works ==
- Bizonfys Aperçus und Reflexionen. Pest, 1871.
- Angol–magyar szótár (English–Hungarian Dictionary). Budapest, 1878. 2nd expanded edition: Budapest, 1886. Online edition
- Magyar–angol szótár (Hungarian–English Dictionary). Budapest, 1881. 2nd expanded edition: Budapest, 1886. Online edition
- Angol és magyar beszélgetések (English and Hungarian Conversations). Budapest, 1885.
