= Haigermoos =

- Municipality
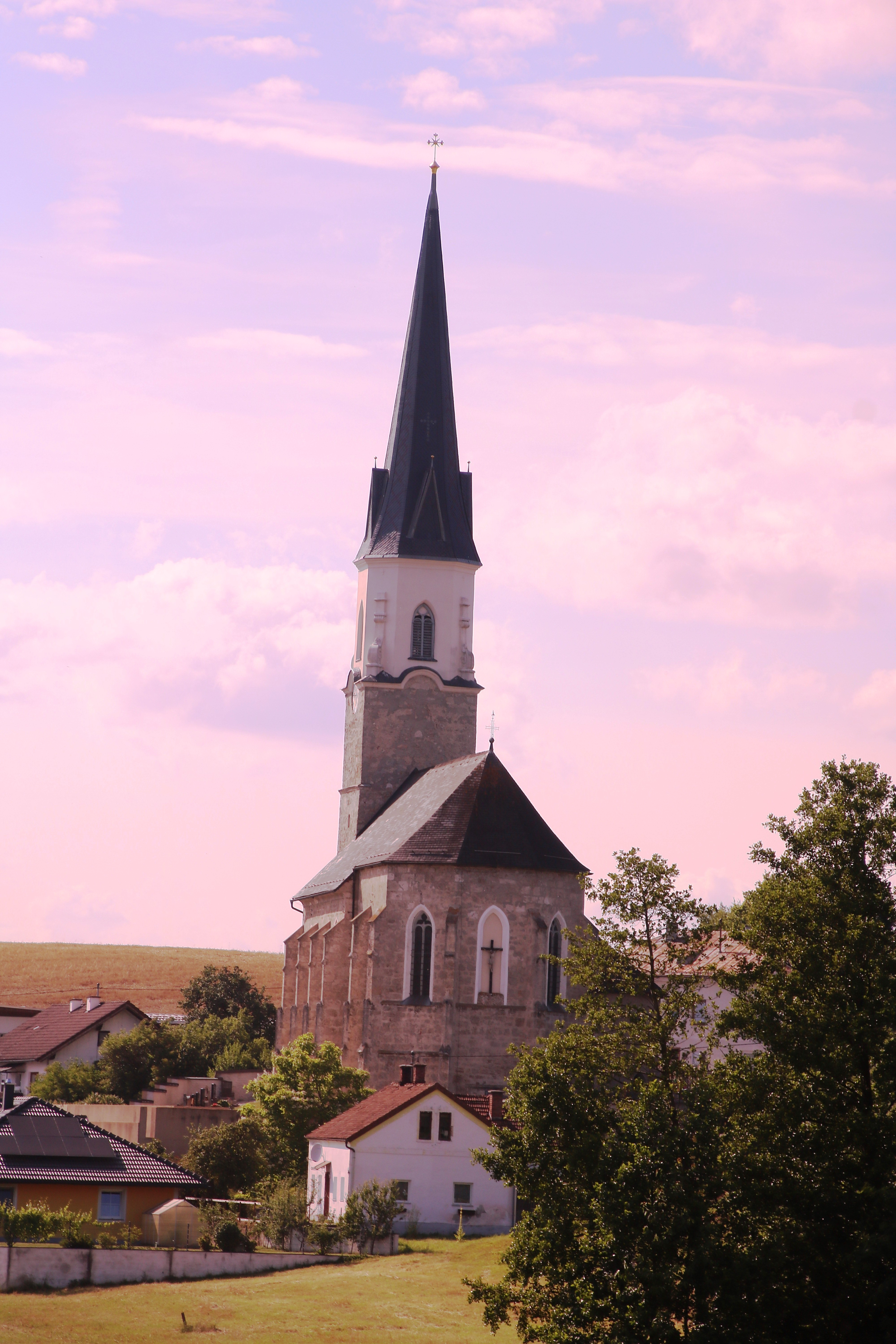
- Pfarrkiche Church in Haigermoos

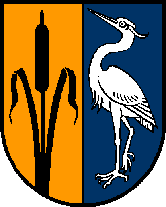
- Coat of arms

- Location within Austria
- Coordinates: 48°02′41″N 12°52′58″E
- Country: Austria
- State: Upper Austria
- District: Braunau am Inn

Government
  - Mayor: Johann Schwankner (ÖVP)

Area
  - Total: 7.45 km^{2} (2.88 sq mi)
- Elevation: 470 m (1,540 ft)

Population (2018-01-01)
  - Total: 610
  - Density: 82/km^{2} (210/sq mi)
- Time zone: UTC+1 (CET)
  - Summer (DST): UTC+2 (CEST)
- Postal code: 5120
- Area code: 06277
- Vehicle registration: BR
- Website: www.haigermoos.at

Haigermoos is a municipality in the district of Braunau am Inn in the Austrian state of Upper Austria. Today nothing remains of the infamous Weyer concentration camp for Roma placed here before 1945.

== Geography ==
Haigermoos lies in the upper Innviertel halfway between Salzburg and Braunau am Inn.
