= Lackenbach =

- Municipality
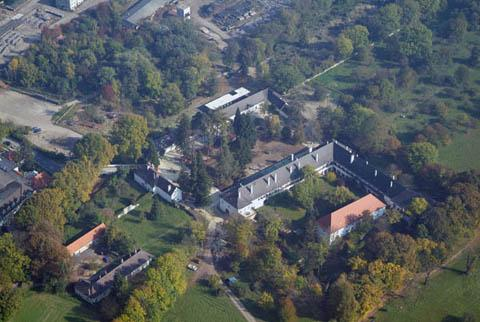
- Aerial view

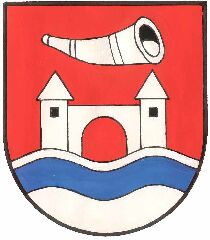
- Coat of arms

- Location within Austria
- Coordinates: 47°35′22″N 16°27′46″E
- Country: Austria
- State: Burgenland
- District: Oberpullendorf

Government
  - Mayor: Christian Weninger (SPÖ)

Area
  - Total: 18.11 km^{2} (6.99 sq mi)
- Elevation: 313 m (1,027 ft)

Population (2018-01-01)
  - Total: 1,167
  - Density: 64.44/km^{2} (166.9/sq mi)
- Time zone: UTC+1 (CET)
  - Summer (DST): UTC+2 (CEST)
- Postal code: 7322
- Area code: 02619
- Vehicle registration: OP

Lackenbach (Hungarian: Lakompak, Croatian: Lakimpuh) is an Austrian municipality in the District of Oberpullendorf, Burgenland.

== Geography ==
Lackenbach lies in the Oberpullendorf District, the Middle Burgenland and is not divided into any districts.

== History ==
Between 1548 and 1552, Lackenbach was developed as a fort. After 1670-71 many Jews from Vienna settled there. From the 18th century, Lackenbach belonged to Prince Esterházy's Siebengemeinden where the Jews had their own autonomous administration.

The town, like the rest of Burgenland, belonged to the Kingdom of Hungary until 1920–21. After the end of the First World War, the western border area of Hungary was awarded to Austria by the Treaties of St. Germain and Trianon. Since 1921, the town has belonged to the newly founded State of Burgenland.

In 1940, a "Gypsy-Anhaltelager" (Zigeunerlager) was established on municipal territory at a former estate of the Esterházys. The inmates, mainly Romani from Burgenland, were made to do forced labor and, starting in 1943, were partially deported to Auschwitz-Birkenau where they were murdered. At the end of March 1945, the camp's administrators fled the approaching Red Army, so there were never any evacuation marches.

== Politics ==
Lackenbach's mayor is Ing. Heinrich Dorner of the SPÖ, and its vice-mayor is Gerhard Wukovits of the ÖVP. The chief officer is Christian Janitsch.

The mandate assignments in the Municipal Council (19 seats) are SPÖ 11, ÖVP 8, FPÖ 0, Grüne 0, and other lists 0.

== Notable residents ==
- Julius Deutsch, Austrian politician born here
- Tobias Jakobovits, rabbi, historian, and librarian
- Rudolf Sarközi, Romani community leader, born in the Lackenbach concentration camp
- Shalom Ullmann, Bavaria-born rabbi, lived and died here

== Gallery ==
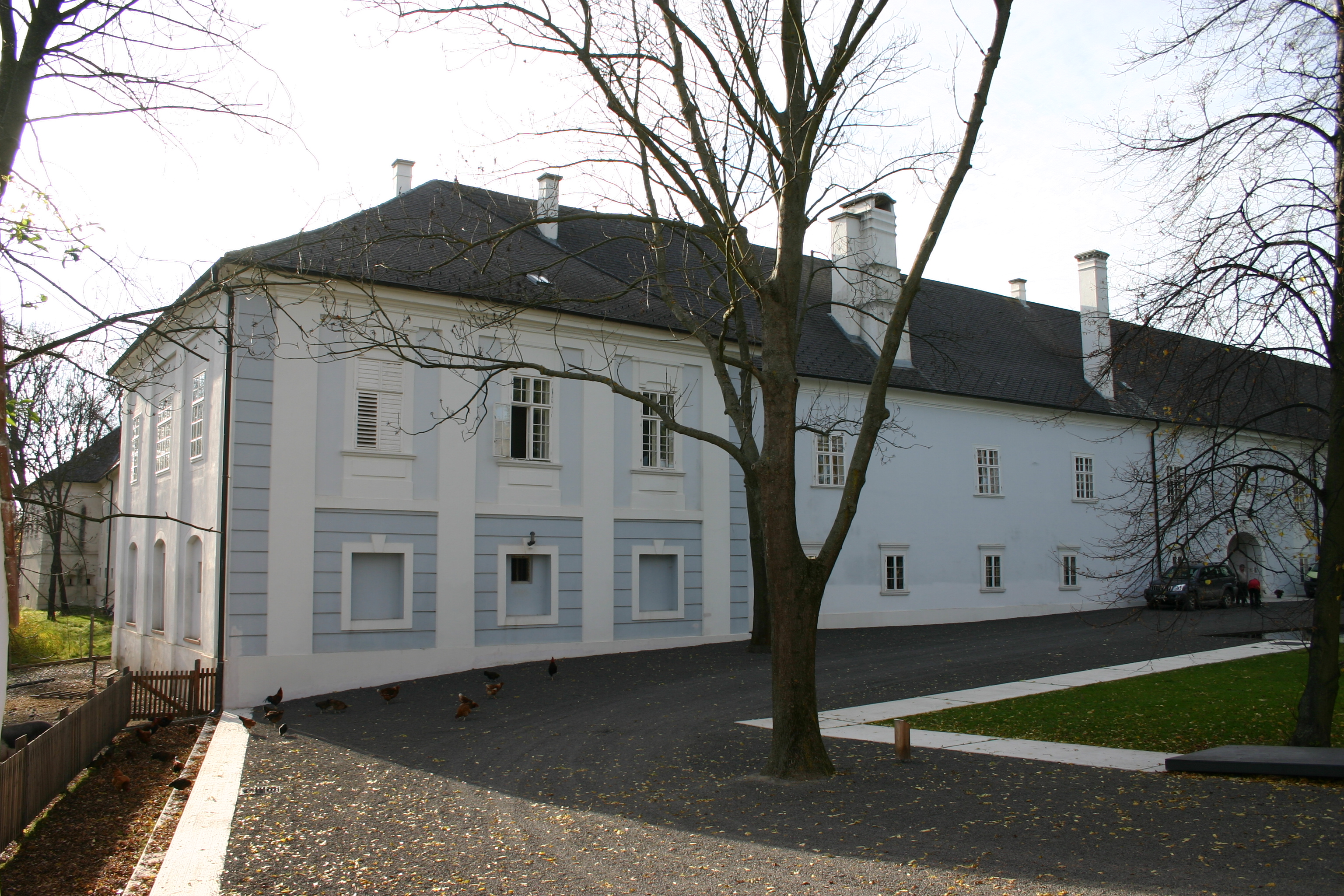

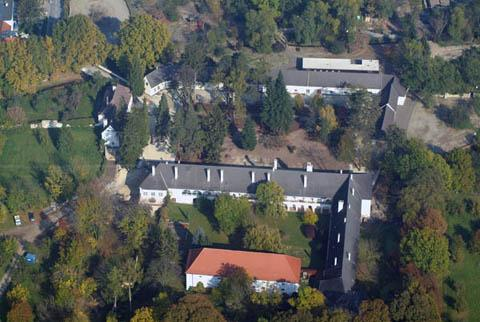

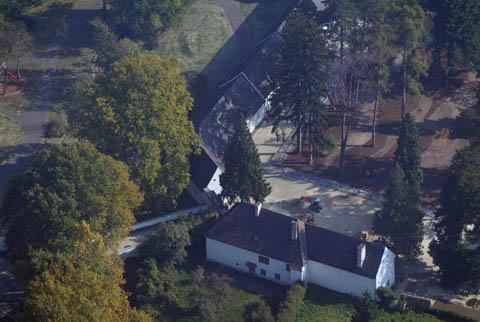

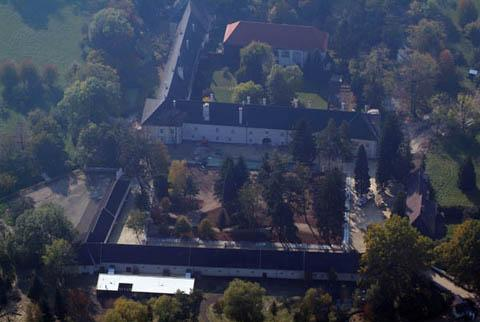

== See also ==
- Siebengemeinden
- Weyer concentration camp
