= Rudolf Sarközi =

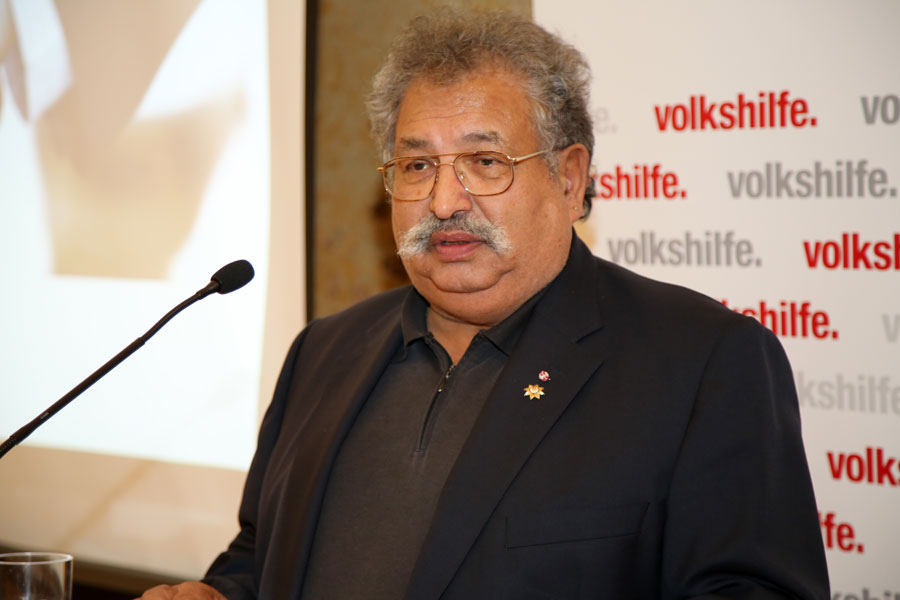
Rudolf Sarközi-1784

Rudolf Sarközi (11 November 1944 – 12 March 2016) was the chairman of the Austrian Romani association Kulturverein.

Sarközi was born in the Lackenbach concentration camp in Burgenland, Austria. After the liberation of the camp, he returned with his mother to her home in Burgenland. At the age of 14 he started working, and in 1964 married Helga, moving with her to her home town of Vienna.

After a career in electronics, Sarközi founded the Austrian Romani Cultural Society and achieved legal recognition for the Romani minority in Austria. He retired in 1997 to concentrate on his work for the Society and died in 2016 at the age of 71.
