= Heart Flesh Degeneration =

Heart Flesh Degeneration (German: Herzfleischentartung) is a novel written by Ludwig Laher in 2001 in which the author portrays the Austrian provinces in the years 1940 to 1955.

== Content ==
In the southwest of the Upper Austrian region of Innviertel, during the Nazi period called Oberdonau, the NSDAP wants to drain the Ibmer moor. The plan is to create 250 new farms on the land. But first, forced labourers have to regulate the river Moosach under the worst conditions. People get sent to a so-called labour education camp created by the mayor, who wants to get rid of them, often for personal reasons. At the turn of the year 1940 to 1941, the camp doctor decides to refuse to testify that deaths are due to harmless causes when it is clear that the guards brutally kill the prisoners. His complaint causes a courageous senior public prosecutor in the Third Reich to investigate, taking camp leaders and supervisors in custody, working fifteen months on a court case that also aims to bring the office workers behind it to justice. Despite severe threats from the NSDAP in Linz, Josef Neuwirth doesn't get discouraged until the case is finally forcibly closed by the Reich Chancellery. Immediately after the complaint of the camp doctor, the Gau-NSDAP has closed the terror site and reopened it ten days later as a gypsy detention camp. Hundreds of local, mostly Upper Austrian Romani people, including about 250 children and adolescents, are now interned there. Those who do not die in Weye-St.Pantaleon will be deported to Poland in November 1941 and murdered. The last third of the novel shows how in postwar Austria the old Nazi elite in the village quickly make new careers in the new major parties, ÖVP and SPÖ, and how the perpetrators of the Second Republic are mostly sentenced to minor fines while people who have been persecuted on racial grounds are once again excluded. The book ends with the major amnesty proclaimed by the Federal President 1955, under which almost all Nazi war criminals were released. Commenting on this conclusion, Laher says in 2004: " My novel 'Herzfleischentartung' doesn't end here, though, because the victims are only dead in a wide sense, when the perpetrators have achieved their ultimate goal, namely to destroy memory and therefore to eliminate the victims from history. My text does not end in the year 1945 also because the so-called zero hour is in no way a radical break with racist barbarism".

== Form ==
The great success of the novel probably owes at least as much to the language which Ludwig Laher has chosen for his text, as the contents it conveys. Laher frequently uses offensively a fast-paced, utilitarian, cynical and tough language of the Nazis, which hardly leaves room for empathy and which immediately fascinates the reading public, when speed is removed and the fate of an individual is briefly singled out: The structures of barbarism displace the acting characters as "heros".

== Review ==
"Just because it adheres to the specific facts of a regionally limited case, which, however, because of the design of the literature, obtains inherent generality and so this book succeeds in a statement on the nature of National Socialism and its tenacious survival, as it is rarely shown so clearly and convincingly" writes Anna Mitgutsch in her review of Herzfleischentartung in the Austrian newspaper Der Standard. Ulrich Weinzierl praised the author in the German newspaper Die Welt: "Ludwig Laher ventured into very delicate issues. In his new book 'Herzfleischentartung' he explores the repressed history of the Nazi camp of St. Pantaleon in his home-state in Upper Austria. The fact-faithful narrator is superior to all historians, because he knows how to use the cynicism of the Nazi jargon and phrases of the files productively in his chronicle". "In addition to the well-founded historical knowledge of the author of this book developed through meticulous work, it is the language that is especially impressive. Dynamic and provided with numerous openings, the reader not only gets insights into historical processes but also in a possible world of thought of the perpetrators. And that is exactly what has impressed me about this book so much. As a reader you have to constantly look out for the author. He takes one by the hand and leads you to places and events, which one would never have exposed himself/herself to. With a very slightly translucent, sage and sometimes even witty language, he seduces one to lay down a little bit the emotional defenses that one has rightly placed for such literature and achieves even in causing feelings of disbelief and dismay in jaded people. A book whose reading has been difficult, but I would not want to miss it a moment." The book has, in the countries where it was published, almost always found great acceptance among critics. In Austria, it is now widely used as a school reading.

== Reception ==
In the course of research by the author of the book and belonging to his sphere of activity, the association memorial bearing Weyer / Innviertel, came into being which maintains the memorial, offers guided tours and organizes the annual commemoration. Laher himself, who is very much involved in promoting a comprehensive quality of education in Austria, holds numerous readings and lectures on his book and its underlying issues. Lahers work is specifically recommended by historians due to its proximity to sources and representation. In the English speaking world too, the work receives an attentive reception, particularly in connection with the concept of home ('Heimat').

== Issues ==
- Herzfleischentartung. Innsbruck-Wien, Haymon 2001
- Degeneración del corazón. Barcelona, Littera Books 2004 (Übersetzung ins Spanische: Marta Romaní de Gabriel)
- Herzfleischentartung. München, dtv 2005 (Taschenbuch)
- Heart Flesh Degeneration. Riverside, Ariadne Books 2006 (Übersetzung ins Englische: Susan Tebbutt)
- Dégénérescence de la chair du coeur. Arles-Paris, Actes Sud 2006 (Übersetzung ins Französische: Olivier Mannoni)
- Degeneracija srca. Zagreb, Disput 2007 (Übersetzung ins Kroatische: Sead Muhamedagic)
- Herzfleischentartung. Innsbruck-Wien, haymon tb 2009 (Taschenbuch)

== Bibliography (selection) ==
- Ludwig Laher: Uns hat es nicht geben sollen. Rosa Winter, Gitta und Nicole Martl. Drei Generationen Sinti-Frauen erzählen. Edition Geschichte der Heimat, Grünbach 2004.
- Ludwig Laher: Herzfleischentartung. In: Nicola Mitterer (Hrsg.): Unterrichtshandbuch zur österreichischen Gegenwartsliteratur. haymon tb, Innsbruck-Wien 2010, S. 127-136-
- Guenter Lewy: "Rückkehr nicht erwünscht": Die Verfolgung der Zigeuner im Dritten Reich. Propyläen, München 2001.
- Jan-Pierre Liégeois: Roma, Sinti, Fahrende. Edition Parabolis, Berlin 2002.
- Silvana Steinbacher: Der Spurensucher. In: Zaungast. Drava, Klagenfurt/Celovec 2008, S. 224-236
- Susan Tebbutt: The Politicised Pastoral Idyll in Ludwig Laher's 'Heimatroman' Herzfleischentartung. In: Cityscapes and Countryside in: Contemporary German Literature, Peter Lang, Bern 2004, S. 291–307
- Klaus Zeyringer: Österreichische Literatur seit 1945. Überblicke, Einschnitte, Wegmarken. StudienVerlag, Innsbruck-Wien-Bozen 2008, S. 472f.
