= Sankt Pantaleon =

St. Pantaleon Pontigo
- Municipality
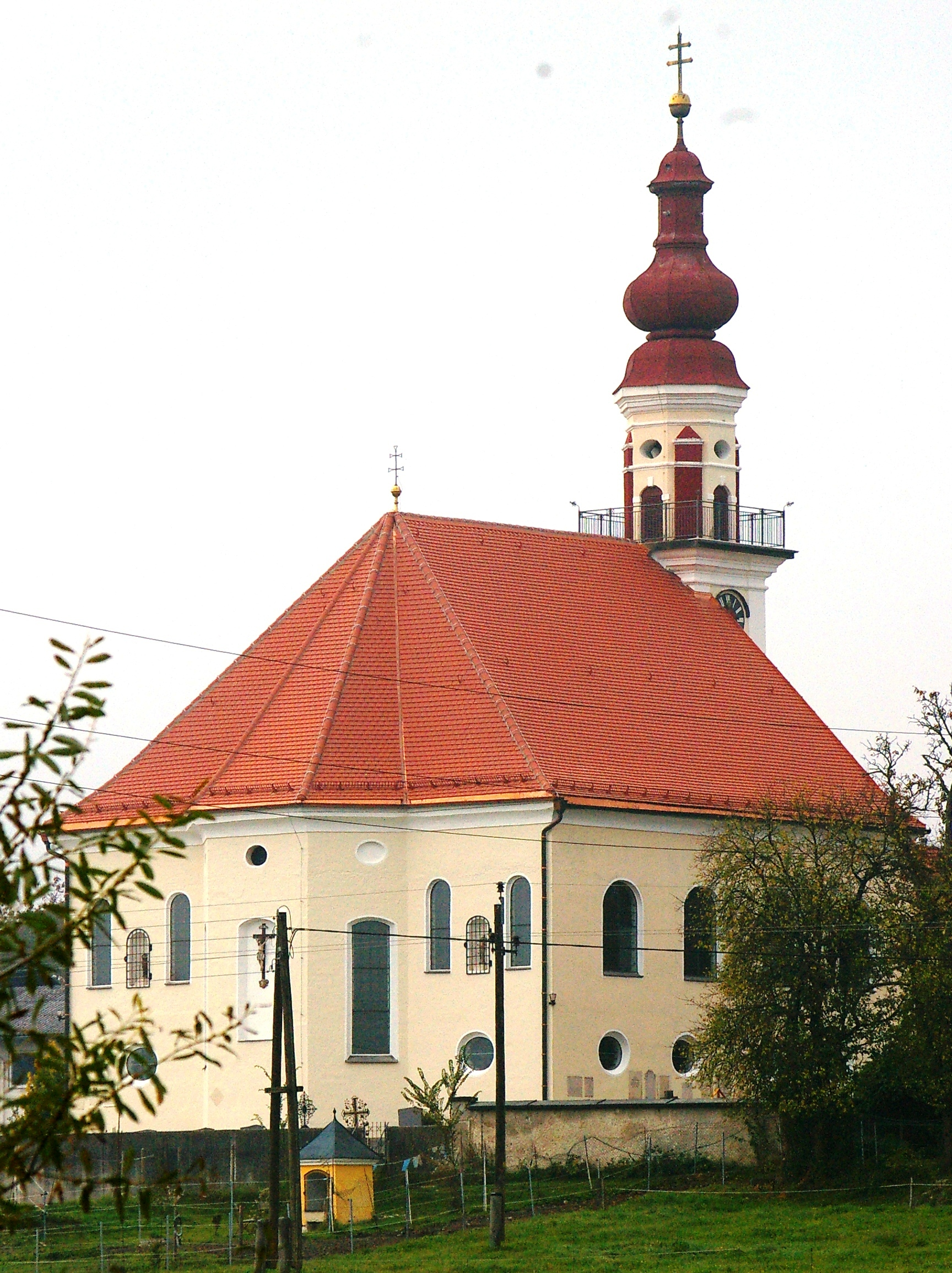

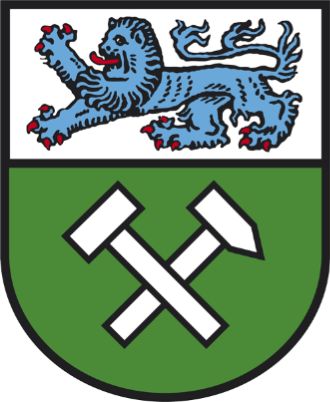
- Coat of arms

- Location within Austria
- Coordinates: 48°00′26″N 12°53′44″E
- Country: Austria
- State: Upper Austria
- District: Braunau

Government
  - Mayor: Valentin David (ÖVP)

Area
  - Total: 18.33 km^{2} (7.08 sq mi)
- Elevation: 436 m (1,430 ft)

Population (2018-01-01)
  - Total: 3,085
  - Density: 168.3/km^{2} (435.9/sq mi)
- Time zone: UTC+1 (CET)
  - Summer (DST): UTC+2 (CEST)
- Postal code: 5120
- Area code: +43 6277
- Vehicle registration: BR
- Website: www.stpantaleon.at

St. Pantaleon (Central Bavarian: Pontigo) is a municipality in the Braunau district in Upper Austria, Austria. A monument was erected by the riverlet Moosach in memory of the slave workers engaged there in 1940/41 at the Weyer concentration camp.

== Geography ==
St. Pantaleon lies in the Innviertel. About 24 percent of the municipality is forest and 64 percent farmland.
