= Shalom Ullmann =

Shalom Charif Ullmann (German: Schalom Ullmann, Salomon-Schalom Ullmann, February 27, 1755 in Fürth – March 6, 1825 in Lackenbach) was a Hungarian Talmudist, who flourished in the beginning of the 19th century. He was a rabbi in Fürth, and later at Boldogasszony (Frauenkirchen), a small town in the county of Wieselburg. He was the author of Dibre Rash (1826), a work containing notes on various Talmudic treatises. He had two sons, Shlomo Zalman (1792 - January 2, 1863) and Avraham (1791 - August 12, 1848). Shalom Charif Ullmann's son, Avraham, and grandson, David, also served as Rabbis of Lackenbach.
