= Ludwig Laher =

Austrian writer (born 1955)

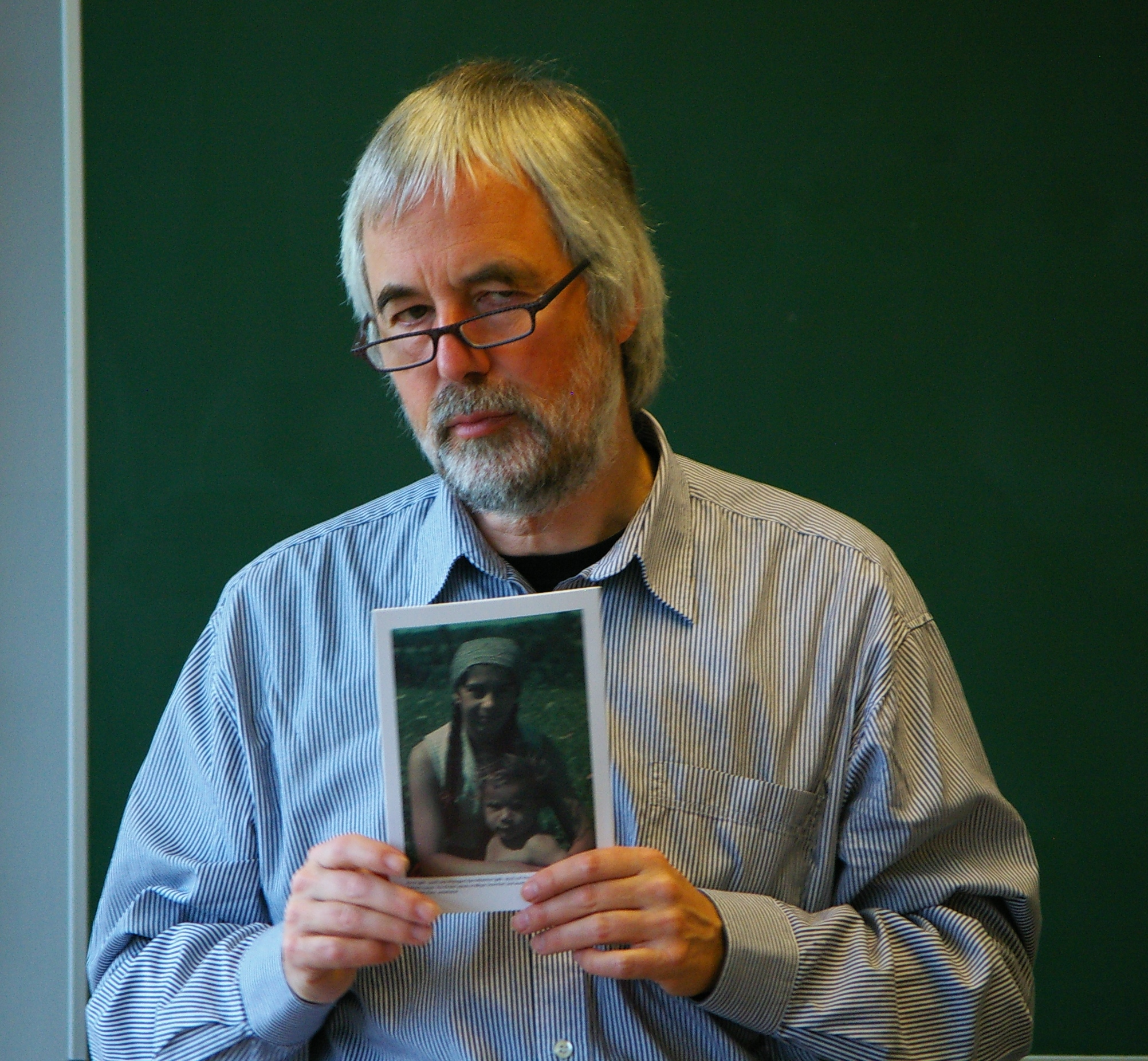

Ludwig Laher (born 11 December 1955 in Linz) is an Austrian writer.

== Life ==
Ludwig Laher studied German, English and American Studies, as well as Classical Studies and graduated with a PhD. He then worked as a high school teacher at the Christian-Dopper high school in Salzburg, Austria. In 1993, Laher moved to St. Pantaleon, Upper Austria and has worked as an independent writer since 1998. He has published prose, lyrical poetry, essays, translations, scientific papers, radio plays and screenplays and received numerous literary prizes and scholarships.

His novel Heart Flesh Degeneration has been praised by critics as well as by historians.
