= Frauenkirchen =

- Municipality
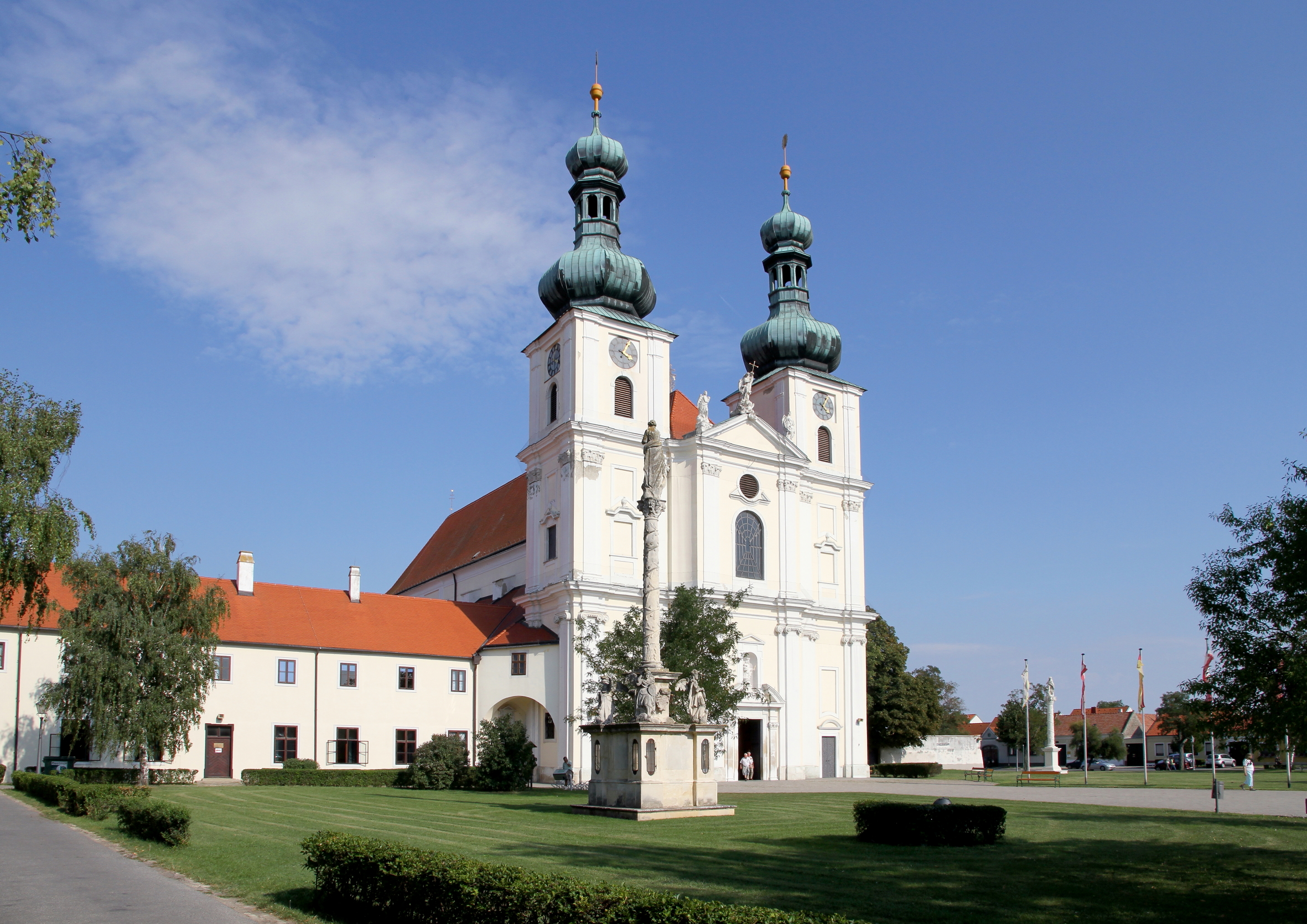
- Basilica church with the Franciscan monastery

- Coat of arms

- Location within Austria
- Coordinates: 47°50′N 16°55′E
- Country: Austria
- State: Burgenland
- District: Neusiedl am See

Government
  - Mayor: Josef Ziniel (SPÖ)

Area
  - Total: 31.95 km^{2} (12.34 sq mi)

Population (2018-01-01)
  - Total: 2,862
  - Density: 89.58/km^{2} (232.0/sq mi)
- Time zone: UTC+1 (CET)
  - Summer (DST): UTC+2 (CEST)
- Postal code: 7132
- Website: www.frauenkirchen.net

Frauenkirchen (Hungarian: Boldogasszony, Fertőboldogasszony, Fertő-Boldogasszony) is an Austrian town in the district of Neusiedl am See, Burgenland.

== History ==
The first mentioning of Frauenkirchen was in 1324 as "Szent Maria". During the Siege of Vienna (1529) and the Battle of Vienna, the village and the church were destroyed by Ottoman forces. Under Paul I, Prince Esterházy, reconstruction of the village would begin.

Around the basilica built from 1695 to 1702, as well as the Franciscan Monastery in the city, the mostly German speaking town would gradually develop into a trading centre from the late 17th century. Since 1897, Frauenkirchen would be connected to the Austro-Hungarian railway network with the Neusiedler Seebahn.

After 1898, the Hungarian name Fertőboldogasszony (or simply "Boldogasszony") would be forcefully used due to Magyarization policies.

The community of Frauenkirchen, like the rest of Burgenland, belonged to Hungary (German-West Hungary) until 1920/21. After the end of the First World War, the territory of German-West Hungary was given to Austria by the Treaties of St. Germain and Trianon. Since 1921, the town has belonged to the newly founded State of Burgenland.

Frauenkirchen was once one of the so-called seven communities (Siebengemeinden) of Jews in Burgenland. The Jews of Burgenland (along with the Roma and Sinti) were persecuted and wiped out by the Nazis between 1938 and 1945. A Jewish cemetery in the village memorializes the presence of a Jewish community here prior to the Holocaust.

Frauenkirchen has been a municipality since 1982 (through VO 5).

== Population ==
Historical population
Year	Pop.	±%
1869	2,571	—
1880	2,902	+12.9%
1890	2,789	−3.9%
1900	2,829	+1.4%
1910	2,732	−3.4%
1923	2,846	+4.2%
1934	3,311	+16.3%
1939	2,850	−13.9%
1951	2,979	+4.5%
1961	2,812	−5.6%
1971	2,749	−2.2%
1981	2,668	−2.9%
1991	2,634	−1.3%
2001	2,856	+8.4%
2011	2,831	−0.9%

== Politics ==
Mayor Hannes Schmid is a member of the SPÖ, Vice-Mayor Martina Kettner is of the ÖVP, and the Chief Officer is Erika Siebler.

The mandate assignments in the Municipal Council (23 seats) is SPÖ 14, ÖVP 6, FPÖ 0, Grüne 0, and other lists 3, as of 2008.

== Notable people ==
- Frauenkirchen is the birthplace of the composer Mihály Mosonyi.
- Shalom Ullmann, Jewish rabbi, lived here
- Hans Niessl, Governor of Burgenland and a regional MP used to be the mayor.
