= Draßburg =

- Municipality
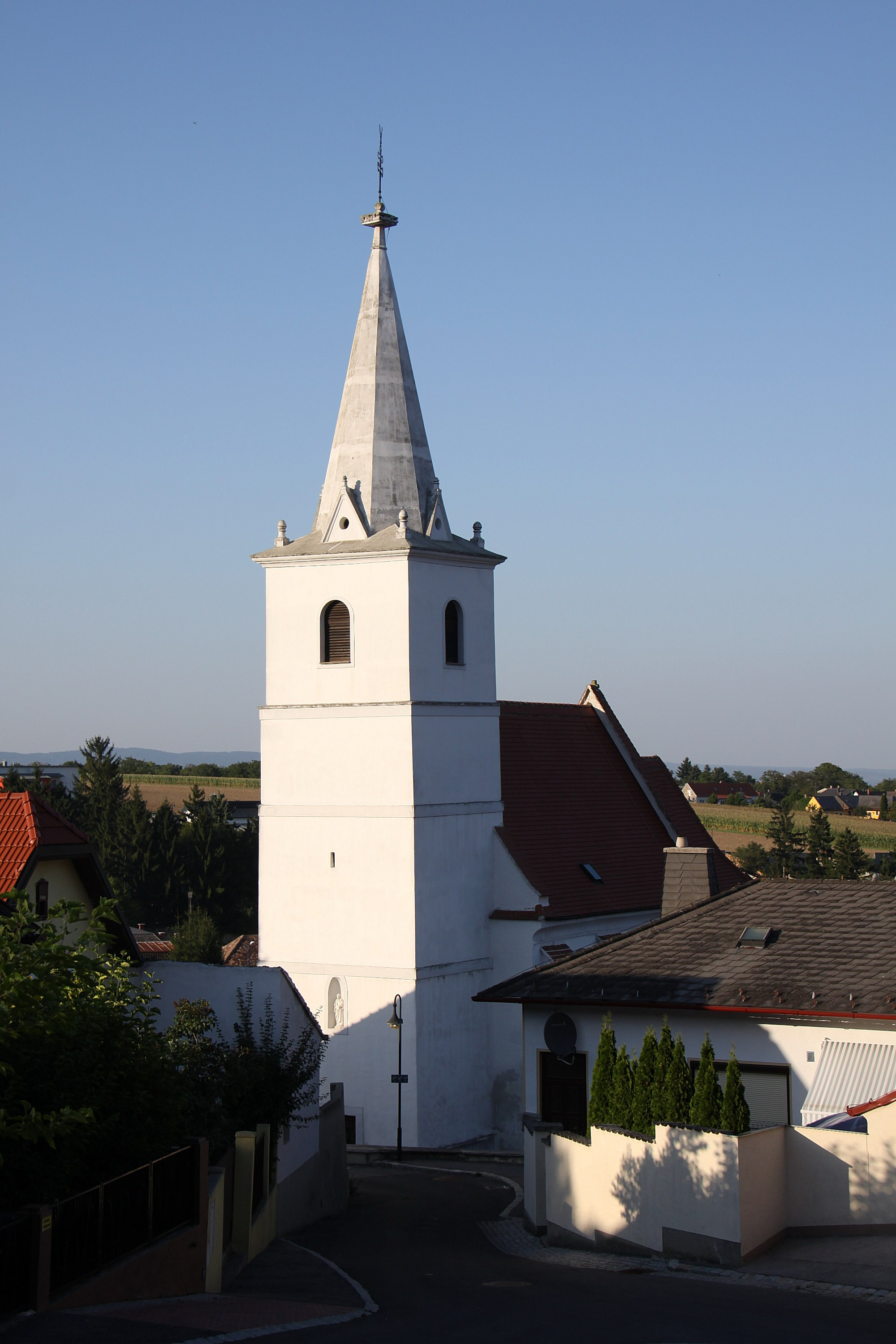
- Draßburg parish church

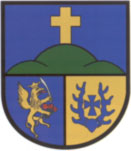
- Coat of arms

- Location within Austria
- Coordinates: 47°45′N 16°29′E
- Country: Austria
- State: Burgenland
- District: Mattersburg

Government
  - Mayor: Christoph Haider

Area
  - Total: 9.67 km^{2} (3.73 sq mi)
- Elevation: 223 m (732 ft)

Population (2018-01-01)
  - Total: 1,199
  - Density: 124/km^{2} (321/sq mi)
- Time zone: UTC+1 (CET)
  - Summer (DST): UTC+2 (CEST)
- Postal code: 7021
- Website: www.drassburg.at

Draßburg (Hungarian: Darufalva, Daru-Falva, Croatian: Rasporak) is a town in the district of Mattersburg in the Austrian state of Burgenland. There are numerous members of the Burgenland-Croatian minority in the village.

== History ==
In 1933 the Venus von Drassburg was found in Drassburg, a 9.5 cm large Neolithic sherd that was stylistically assigned to the Linear Pottery Culture. It is thus an indication of settlement activity in the 5th millennium of Christ. In the Iron Age, the area was part of the Celtic kingdom of Noricum and belonged to the area surrounding the Celtic hilltop settlement of Burg on the Schwarzenbacher Burgberg. Later under the Romans, today's Drassburg was in the province of Pannonia.

On a terrace of the Taborac, the foothills of a range of hills west of Drassburg, which is up to 370 m above sea level. M., in 1904 finds from the La Tène period were discovered alongside Neolithic, Roman and medieval finds. The most important object was a La Tène bangle with pseudo-filigree decorations. Between 1933 and 1934, further objects from this period were discovered during excavations by the Burgenland State Museum. All objects found were buried in the Neolithic soil layer. In 1955 further objects from the late La Tène period were found. The traces of settlement on the Taborac are for the period from the second half of the 1st century BC. to the first half of the 1st century AD.

On the site of Taborac there was a ring wall fortification in the early Middle Ages, which was destroyed in the 11th century. The name "Taborac" refers to the Hussites who named their war camps "Tabor" in the 15th century. More recent sources show that Hussite mercenaries were present in Drassburg. So the name Taborac is right. The Hussites go back to the Czech reformer Jan Hus. He was burned as a heretic in 1415. He denied the infallibility of the pope, "criticized the wealth of the church and only accepted the Bible as valid for questions of faith." The death sentence triggered protests and a freedom movement in Bohemia and beyond, which also spread to the Burgenland-West Hungarian region. The Hussites were socially revolutionary, involved in numerous feuds and plundering, and one of the Hussite mercenary groups under the mercenary leader Georg (Jörg) von Lichtenberg und Vöttau used the Draßburg fortifications as a fortified camp, as Tabor. "Around 1465 the Drassburg Tabor was probably abandoned and evacuated by the Hussites." Drassburg was partially deserted in the 15th century; the Croats, who settled in the village in the 16th century, used the diminutive "Taborac" for Tabor, which was adopted by the remaining German population and has been preserved to this day.

== Population ==
Historical population

Year	Pop.	±%
1869	1,107	—
1880	1,139	+2.9%
1890	1,114	−2.2%
1900	1,258	+12.9%
1910	1,232	−2.1%

Year	Pop.	±%
1923	1,244	+1.0%
1934	1,334	+7.2%
1939	1,209	−9.4%
1951	1,293	+6.9%
1961	1,219	−5.7%

Year	Pop.	±%
1971	1,214	−0.4%
1981	1,157	−4.7%
1991	1,119	−3.3%
2001	1,055	−5.7%
2011	1,127	+6.8%

== Sport ==
- ASV Rasporak, football club of Burgenland Croats
