= Liszthaus Raiding =

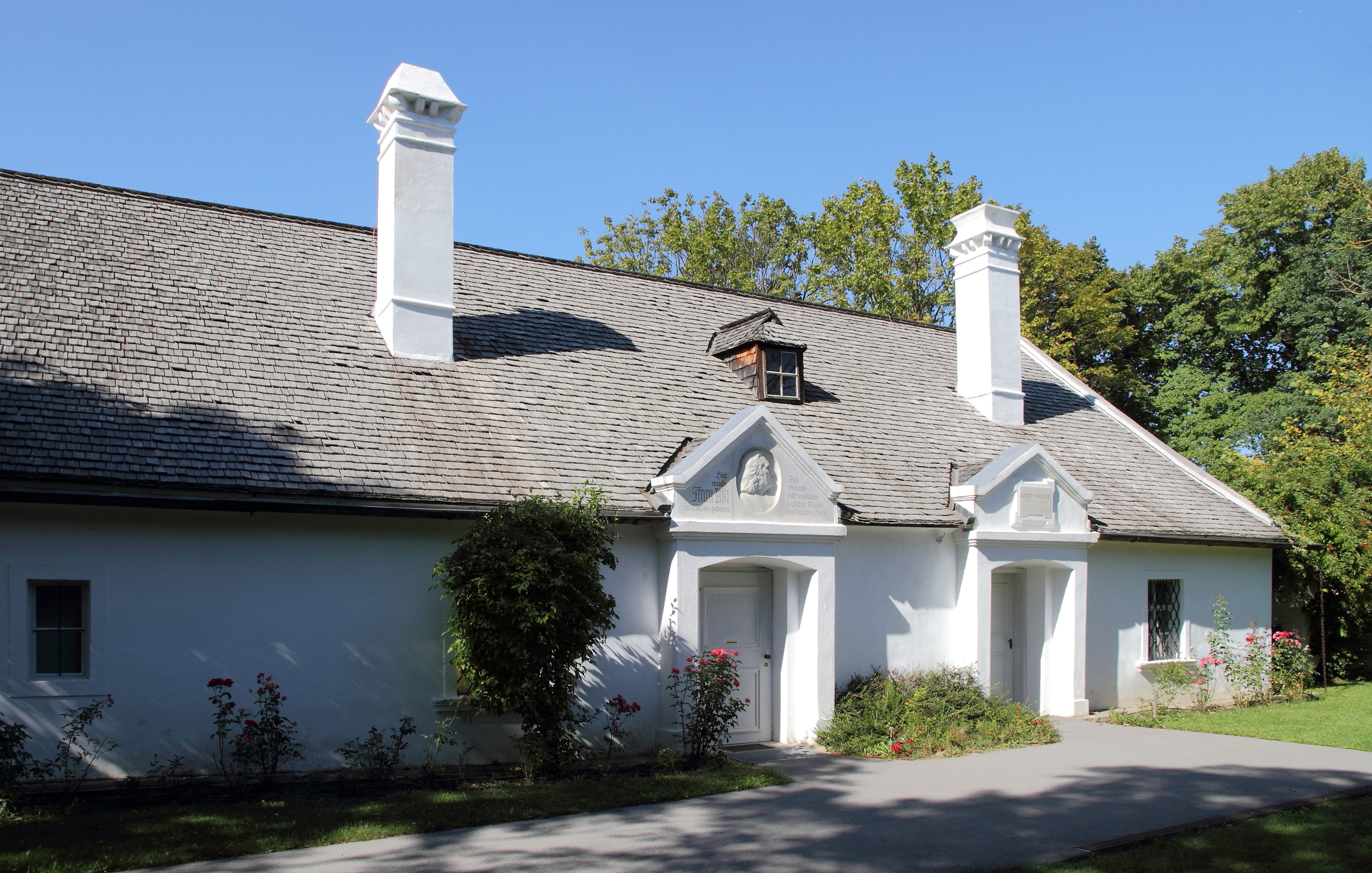

General information
- Location: Lisztzentrum Raiding; Lisztstraße 46; 7321 Raiding, Raiding, Austria
- Coordinates: 47°34′1″N 16°31′45″E
- Completed: 16th century

Website
- http://liszt-haus.at/

The Liszthaus Raiding is the building where Franz Liszt was born in 1811 which has been a museum since 1979. It is located in Raiding, a town in Burgenland province of Austria.

A concert hall next to the house was opened in 2006.

== History ==
=== Liszt's time and earlier ===
The stone building was built in the 16th century; it was part of an estate created by von Guniafalva, a noble, and extended in the mid-17th century by his son-in-law Johann Illesy. The estate was bought in 1805 by the Esterházy family.

At that time, Raiding (Hungarian name Doborján) was in the Kingdom of Hungary. The building had a roof of wooden shingles, and had six rooms, a kitchen and a room for wine fermentation. Adam Liszt, father of the composer, was steward of the sheep on the Esterházy estate; he was also a musician, playing cello in Prince Esterházy's orchestra.

The future composer, only son of Adam Liszt and his wife Maria Anna, was born here on 22 October 1811. He was baptized the following day in the neighbouring town of Unterfrauenhaid. Franz received music lessons from his father from the age of six. Adam was unable to obtain funds for Franz's education from the Esterházy family, and the Liszts moved to Vienna in 1822.

=== Recent years ===
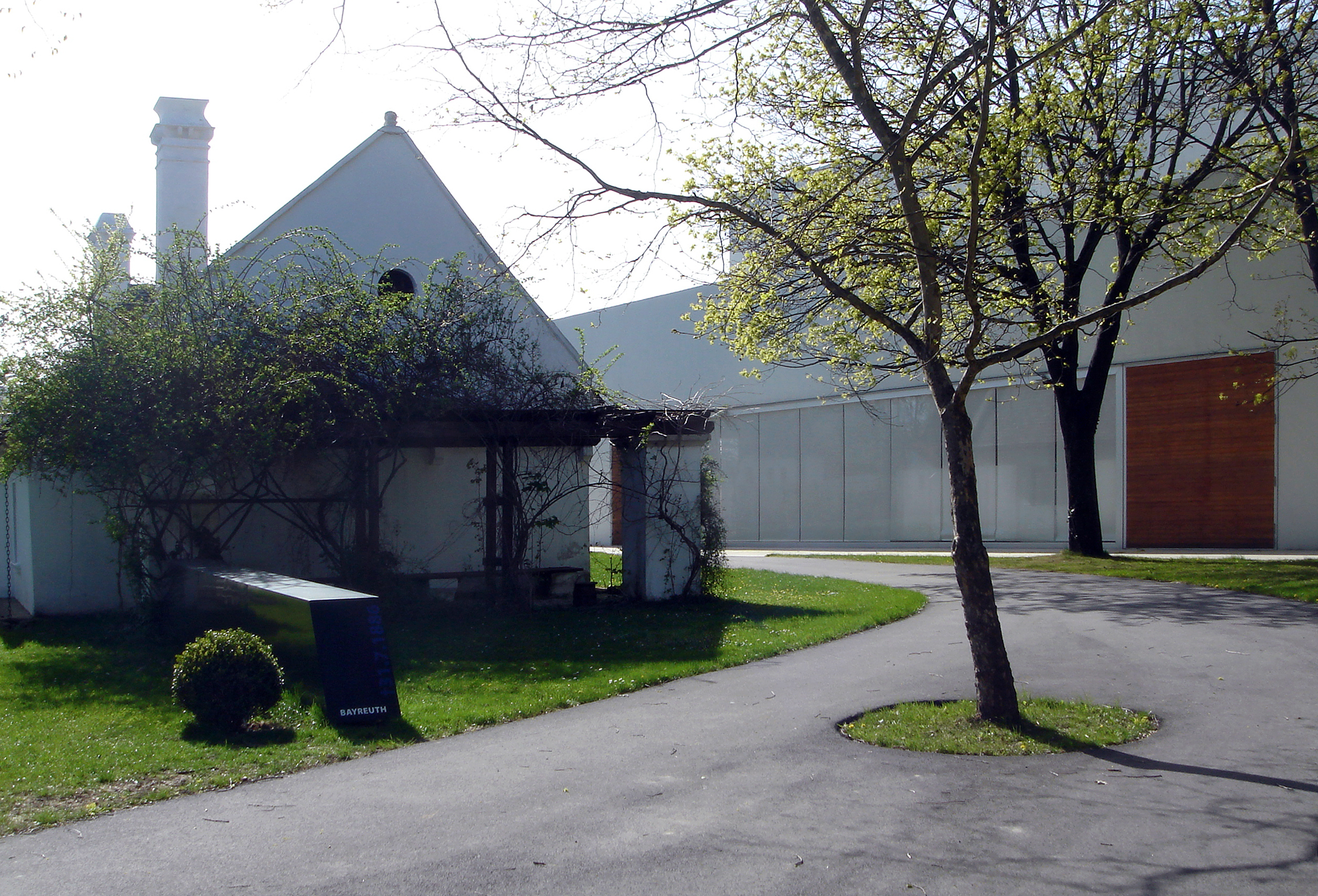
Liszt's birthplace and the adjacent concert hall

In 1951, after renovation lasting two years, the building, called a Gedächtnisstätte (place of remembrance) was officially opened. In 1971 Paul Esterházy, the last owner from the Esterházy family, gave the building to the town of Raiding.

In 1979 the building was re-opened as a museum. The concert hall, next to the house, the Lisztzentrum Raiding, was opened in 2006. Its capacity is about 580, and it is the home of the Raiding Liszt Festival.

The hall's acoustics make it popular for professional CD recordings.

== See also ==
- List of music museums
