= Raiding, Austria =

Raiding
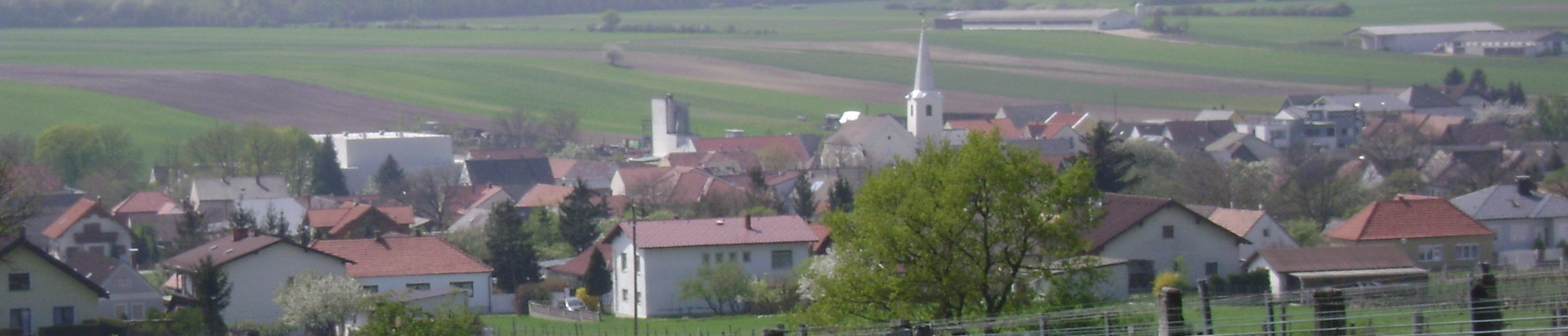

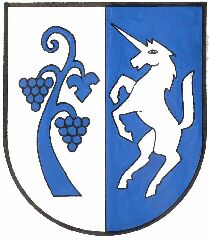
- Coat of arms

- Location within Austria Raiding (Austria)
- Coordinates: 47°34′N 16°32′E
- Country: Austria
- State: Burgenland
- District: Oberpullendorf

Government
  - Mayor: Markus Landauer

Area
  - Total: 13.07 km^{2} (5.05 sq mi)
- Elevation: 253 m (830 ft)

Population (2018-01-01)
  - Total: 865
  - Density: 66.2/km^{2} (171/sq mi)
- Time zone: UTC+1 (CET)
  - Summer (DST): UTC+2 (CEST)
- Postal code: 7321
- Website: raiding-online.at

Raiding (German pronunciation: [ˈʁaɪdɪŋ]; Hungarian: Doborján, pronounced [ˈdoborjaːn]; Croatian: Rajnof) is a small Austrian market town in the district of Oberpullendorf in Burgenland. It is the birthplace of Franz Liszt.

== Geography ==
The municipality lies on Raiding Creek in Middle Burgenland; Raiding is the only borough in the municipality.

== History ==
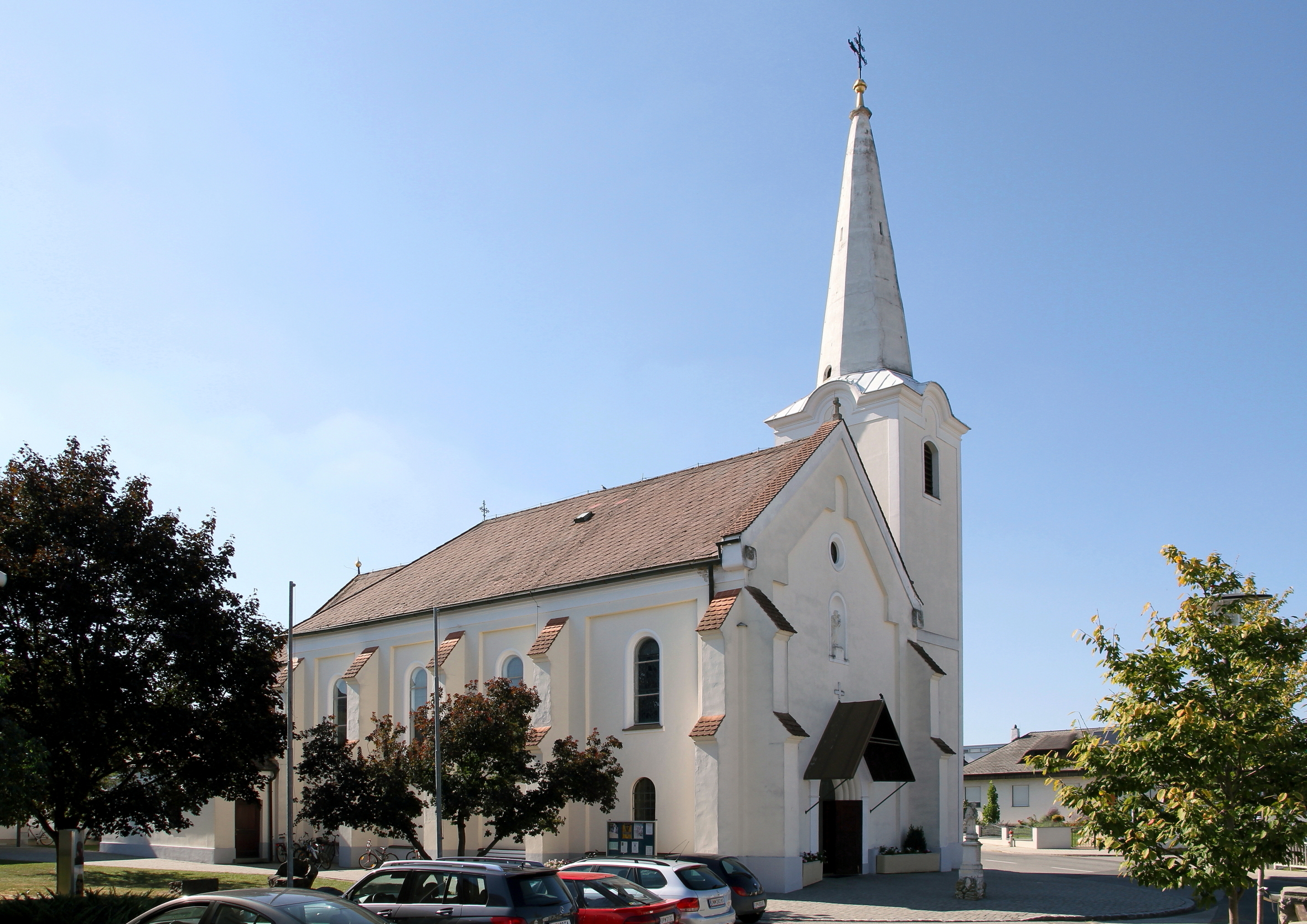
The Church of Saint Anthony of Padua

Raiding was first documented in 1425 as Dobornya.

Like the rest of Burgenland, Raiding belonged to Hungary from c. 900 to 1920/21. After the end of the First World War, Western Hungary was given to Austria with the Treaties of St. Germain and Trianon; there it formed the new province of Burgenland.

In 1971, Raiding was merged with Unterfrauenhaid and Lackendorf into a larger municipality, which was later dissolved. Raiding has been a market town since 1990.

== Population ==
Historical population
Year	Pop.	±%
1869	713	—
1880	736	+3.2%
1890	880	+19.6%
1900	928	+5.5%
1910	928	+0.0%
1923	976	+5.2%
1934	1,076	+10.2%
1939	994	−7.6%
1951	964	−3.0%
1961	872	−9.5%
1971	846	−3.0%
1981	801	−5.3%
1991	854	+6.6%
2001	836	−2.1%
2011	836	+0.0%

== Politics ==
The municipal council has 15 seats with party mandates as follows: SPÖ 9, ÖVP 6, FPÖ 0, Grüne 0, and other lists 0.

== Culture and landmarks ==
- Franz Liszt's birthplace

== Business and infrastructure ==
Viticulture is the main business in Raiding. Other industries there include metal construction and soda water production.

== Personalities ==
- Paul Iby, Bishop of Eisenstadt
- Adam Liszt ∞ Anna Liszt
  - Franz Liszt, composer and musician

== Image gallery ==
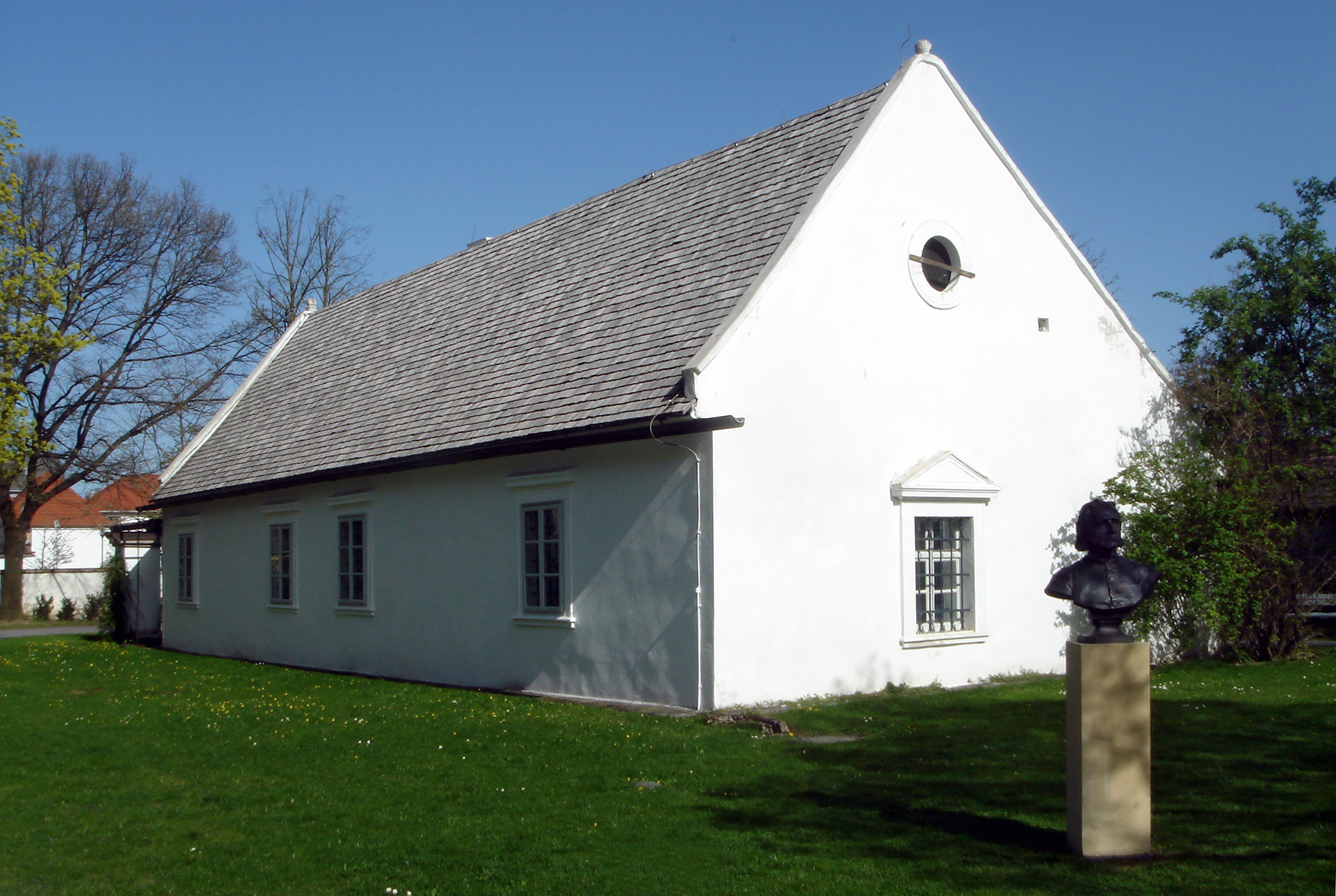
Birthplace of Franz Liszt in Raiding.

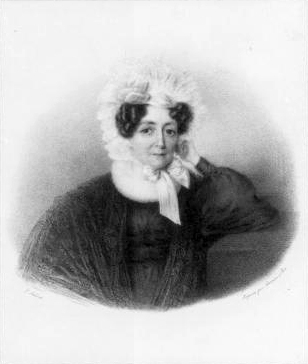
Anna Liszt, mother of Franz Liszt (portrait between 1826 and 1837)

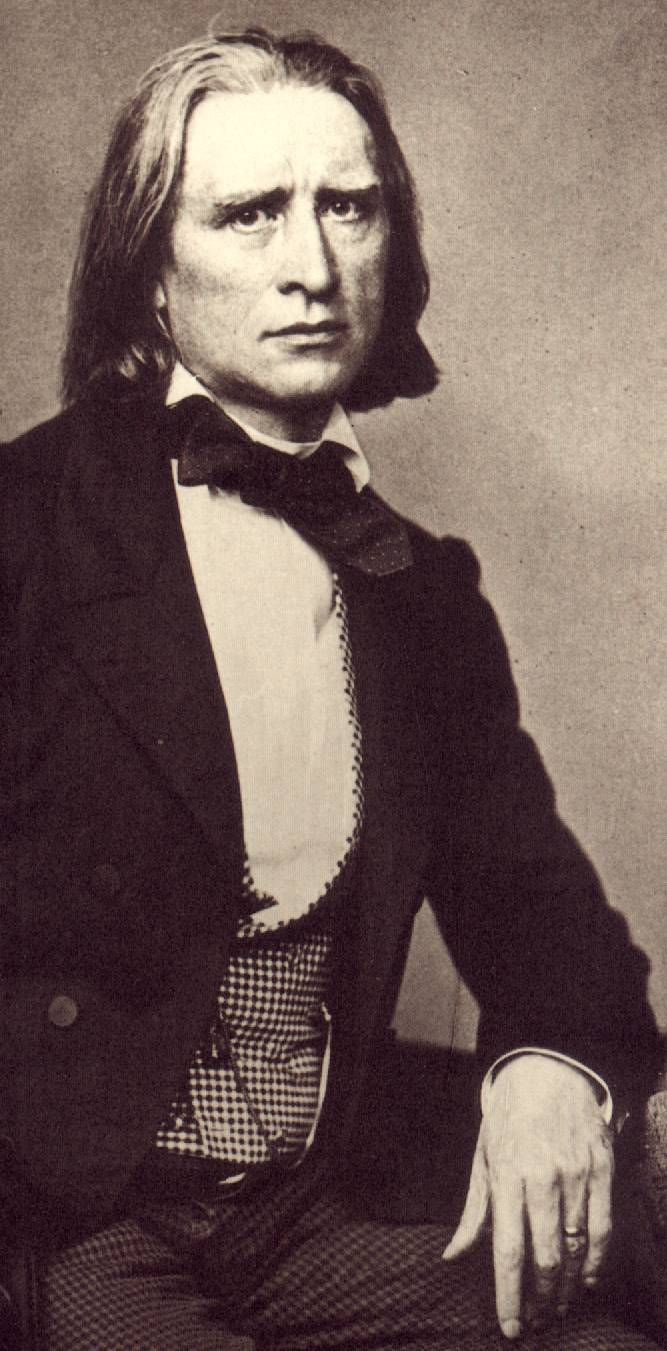
Franz Liszt
