= Eisenstadt =

- Statutory city
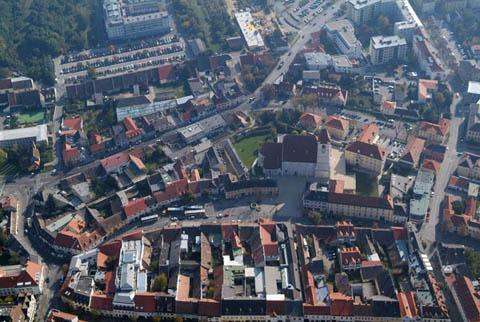
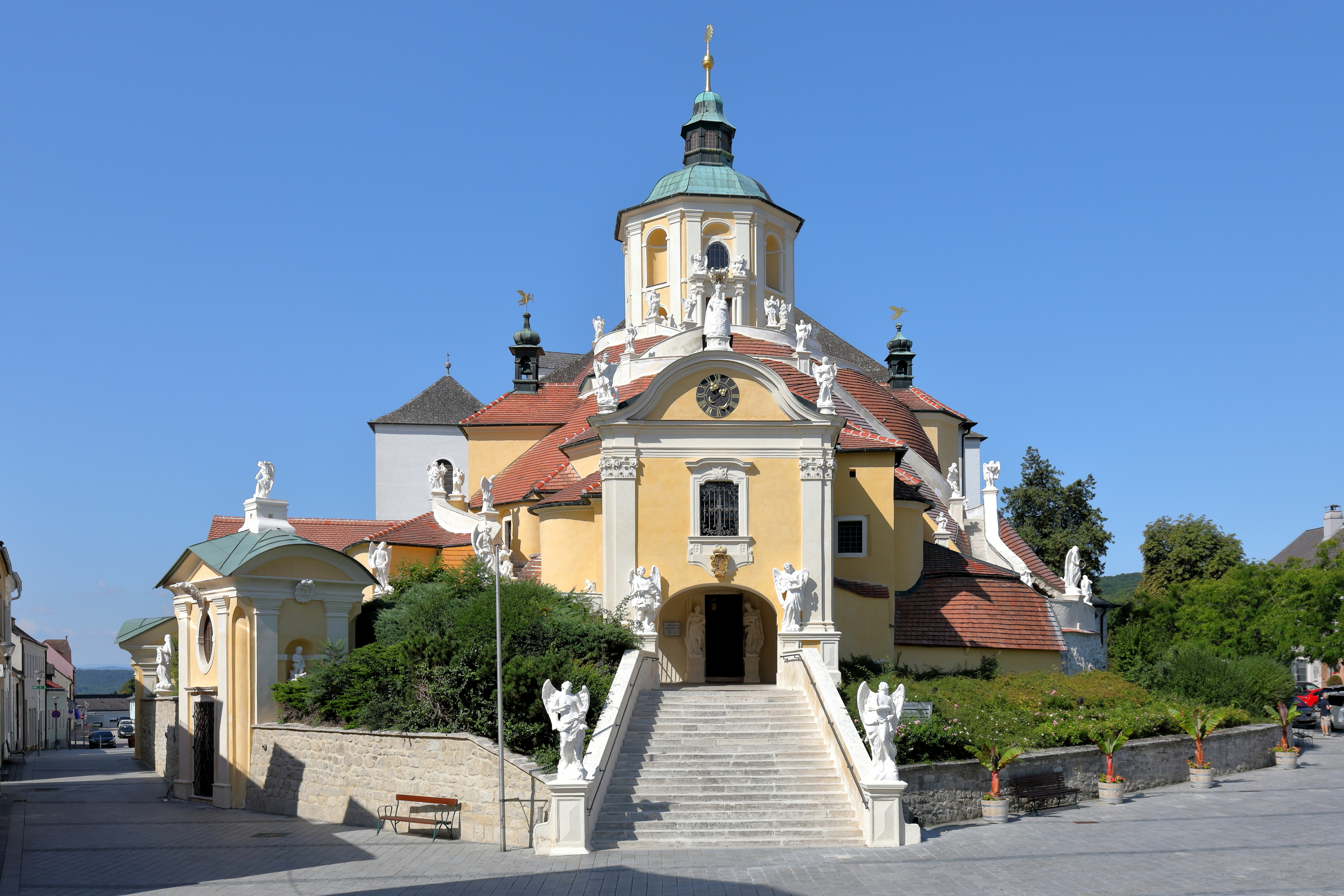
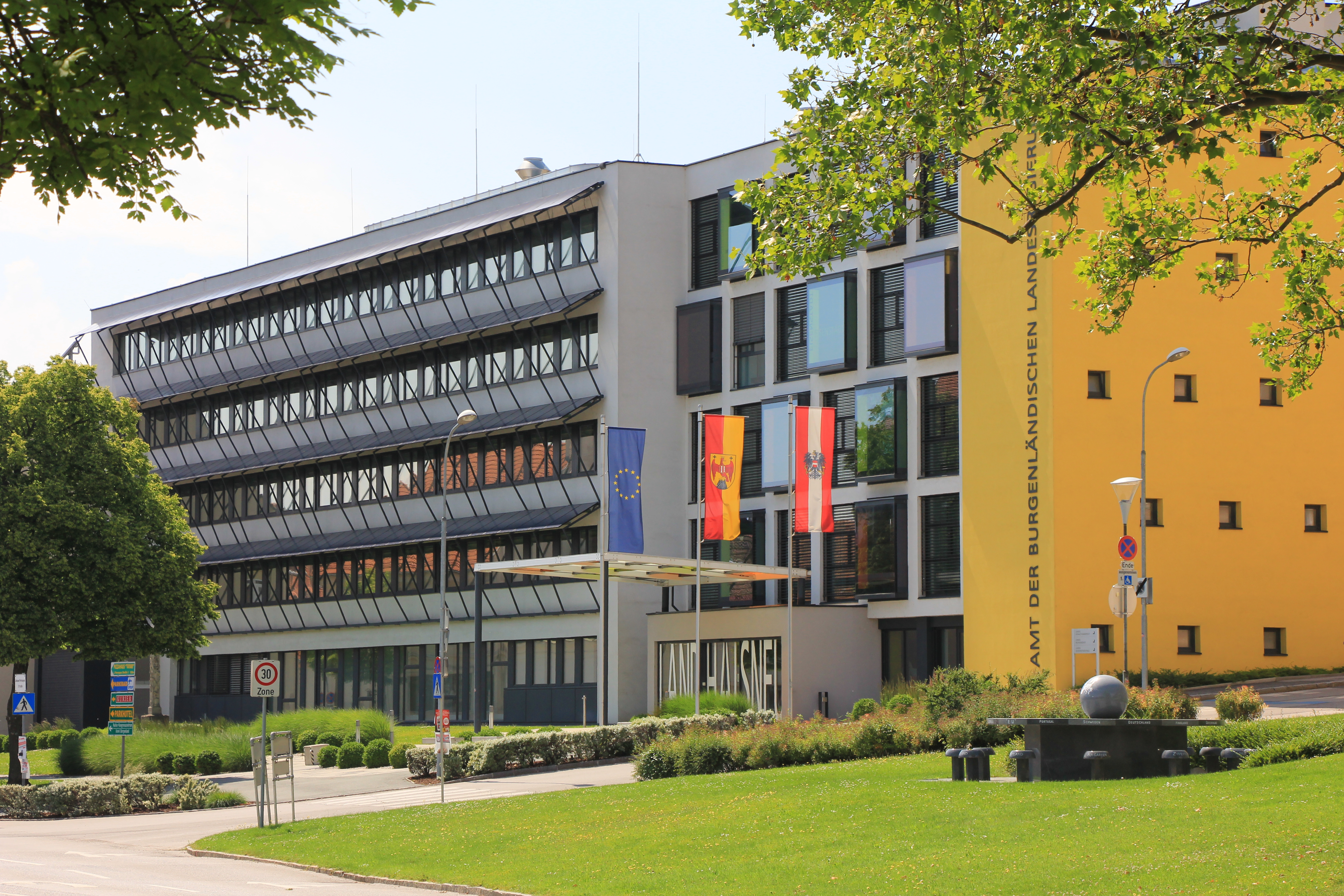
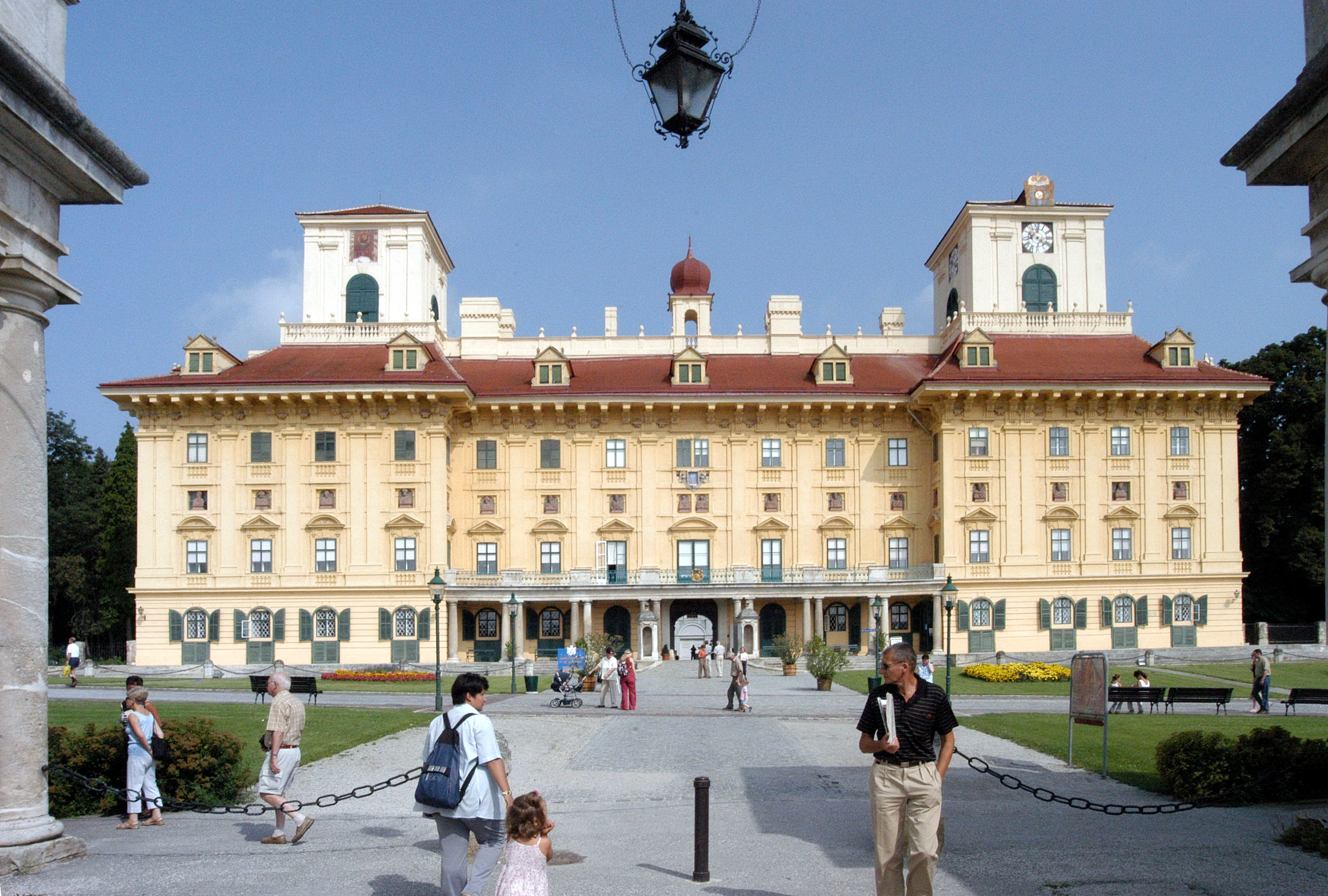
- Clockwise from top: aerial view of the city, state government building, Schloss Esterházy, calvary with Bergkirche

- Flag Coat of arms

- Location within Burgenland Location within Austria
- Coordinates: 47°51′N 16°31′E
- Country: Austria
- State: Burgenland
- District: Statutory city

Government
  - Mayor: Thomas Steiner (ÖVP)

Area
  - Total: 42.88 km^{2} (16.56 sq mi)
- Elevation: 182 m (597 ft)

Population (2018-01-01)
  - Total: 14,476
  - Density: 337.6/km^{2} (874.4/sq mi)
- Time zone: UTC+1 (CET)
  - Summer (DST): UTC+2 (CEST)
- Postal code: 7000
- Area code: 02682
- Vehicle registration: E
- Budget: €42.256 million (2021)
- Expenditure: €42.255 million (2021)
- Website: www.eisenstadt.gv.at

Eisenstadt (Austrian German pronunciation: [ˈaɪzn̩ʃtat]; Austro-Bavarian: Eisnstod; Hungarian: Kismarton; Croatian: Željezni grad or Željezno; Slovene: Železno) is the capital city of the Austrian state of Burgenland. With a population of 16,118 (as of 2025), it is the smallest state capital and the 38th-largest city in Austria overall. It lies at the foot of the Leitha Mountains.

From 1648 to 1921, Kismarton/Eisenstadt was part of the Habsburg Empire's Kingdom of Hungary and the seat of the Hungarian noble family Eszterházy. During this time, the composer Joseph Haydn lived and worked in Eisenstadt as a court musician under the patronage of the Esterházy family. After the cession of Burgenland to Austria in 1921, the city became the province's capital in 1925. As the state capital of Burgenland, it functions as a center of public administration and services and is the seat of three institutes of higher education.

== Geography ==
Eisenstadt lies on a plain leading down to the river Wulka, at the southern foot of the Leitha Mountains, about 12 kilometres (7 miles) from the Hungarian border.

=== Subdivisions ===
Eisenstadt is divided into three districts (Ortsteile):

- Eisenstadt-Stadt (Eisenstadt proper)
- Kleinhöflein im Burgenland (Hungarian: Kishöflány; Croatian: Mala Holovajna) – a town that lies to the west of Eisenstadt proper
- St. Georgen am Leithagebirge (Lajtaszentgyörgy; Svetojurje) – a town that lies to the east of Eisenstadt proper

Furthermore, Eisenstadt is divided into five Katastralgemeinden:

- Eisenstadt-Stadt
- Oberberg, or Oberberg-Eisenstadt (Hungarian: Felsőkismartonhegy; Croatian: Željezno Brig) – the northern area of Eisenstadt starting beyond the Jewish quarter
- Unterberg, or Unterberg-Eisenstadt (Alsókismartonhegy; Željezno Donji Brig) – the southern area of Eisenstadt starting beyond the Kalvarienbergplatz & the Ruster Straße and including the Jewish quarter
- Kleinhöflein im Burgenland
- St. Georgen am Leithagebirge

Other informal areas of the city include Wiesäcker and Lobäcker, which lie south of the Eisbach, a tributary of the Wulka. The city is surrounded by the district (Bezirk) of Eisenstadt-Umgebung.

The city previously included the districts (Ortsteile) of Eisenstadt-Stadt, Eisenstadt-Oberberg, Eisenstadt-Unterberg, and Eisenstadt-Schloßgrund (Kismartonváralja).

=== Nearby municipalities ===
- Großhöflein, Müllendorf, Steinbrunn, Neufeld/Leitha and Ebenfurth
- Hornstein
- Wulkaprodersdorf, Trausdorf/Wulka (on the Wulka and Eisbach)

=== Climate ===
Climate data for Eisenstadt (1981–2010)
Month	Jan	Feb	Mar	Apr	May	Jun	Jul	Aug	Sep	Oct	Nov	Dec	Year
Record high °C (°F)	20.5 (68.9)	21.1 (70.0)	24.1 (75.4)	27.2 (81.0)	33.2 (91.8)	36.1 (97.0)	38.7 (101.7)	38.4 (101.1)	33.7 (92.7)	28.0 (82.4)	21.9 (71.4)	19.8 (67.6)	38.7 (101.7)
Mean daily maximum °C (°F)	3.1 (37.6)	5.3 (41.5)	10.4 (50.7)	16.1 (61.0)	21.1 (70.0)	24.0 (75.2)	26.7 (80.1)	26.1 (79.0)	20.9 (69.6)	15.0 (59.0)	8.3 (46.9)	3.5 (38.3)	15.0 (59.0)
Daily mean °C (°F)	−0.1 (31.8)	1.3 (34.3)	5.5 (41.9)	10.7 (51.3)	15.7 (60.3)	18.8 (65.8)	21.0 (69.8)	20.2 (68.4)	15.5 (59.9)	10.2 (50.4)	4.9 (40.8)	0.8 (33.4)	10.4 (50.7)
Mean daily minimum °C (°F)	−2.8 (27.0)	−1.7 (28.9)	1.8 (35.2)	6.0 (42.8)	10.5 (50.9)	13.7 (56.7)	15.7 (60.3)	15.5 (59.9)	11.5 (52.7)	6.9 (44.4)	2.3 (36.1)	−1.6 (29.1)	6.5 (43.7)
Record low °C (°F)	−21.6 (−6.9)	−19.8 (−3.6)	−19.2 (−2.6)	−2.8 (27.0)	1.2 (34.2)	3.7 (38.7)	6.9 (44.4)	6.8 (44.2)	2.1 (35.8)	−5.9 (21.4)	−12.3 (9.9)	−17.8 (0.0)	−21.6 (−6.9)
Average precipitation mm (inches)	38 (1.5)	34 (1.3)	59 (2.3)	52 (2.0)	77 (3.0)	90 (3.5)	77 (3.0)	91 (3.6)	78 (3.1)	53 (2.1)	57 (2.2)	51 (2.0)	758 (29.8)
Average snowfall cm (inches)	13 (5.1)	10 (3.9)	6 (2.4)	0 (0)	0 (0)	0 (0)	0 (0)	0 (0)	0 (0)	0 (0)	5 (2.0)	12 (4.7)	46 (18)
Average relative humidity (%) (at 14:00)	70.5	62.6	56.5	50.4	52.9	53.5	50.2	51.4	56.0	62.3	70.6	74.7	59.3
Mean monthly sunshine hours	73	107	145	204	246	245	272	254	188	139	72	53	1,999
Percentage possible sunshine	27.7	38.3	41.0	51.8	55.2	54.4	59.7	60.1	51.8	42.7	26.6	21.1	44.2
Source: Central Institute for Meteorology and Geodynamics

Climate data for Eisenstadt (1971–2000)
Month	Jan	Feb	Mar	Apr	May	Jun	Jul	Aug	Sep	Oct	Nov	Dec	Year
Record high °C (°F)	18.8 (65.8)	19.7 (67.5)	27.4 (81.3)	27.2 (81.0)	30.8 (87.4)	36.1 (97.0)	36.4 (97.5)	37.0 (98.6)	33.7 (92.7)	26.4 (79.5)	21.9 (71.4)	19.8 (67.6)	37.0 (98.6)
Mean daily maximum °C (°F)	2.8 (37.0)	5.3 (41.5)	10.4 (50.7)	15.3 (59.5)	20.6 (69.1)	23.4 (74.1)	25.9 (78.6)	25.7 (78.3)	20.9 (69.6)	14.8 (58.6)	7.7 (45.9)	4.0 (39.2)	14.7 (58.5)
Daily mean °C (°F)	−0.4 (31.3)	1.3 (34.3)	5.5 (41.9)	9.9 (49.8)	15.1 (59.2)	18.1 (64.6)	20.2 (68.4)	19.8 (67.6)	15.3 (59.5)	9.8 (49.6)	4.3 (39.7)	1.1 (34.0)	10.0 (50.0)
Mean daily minimum °C (°F)	−2.9 (26.8)	−1.6 (29.1)	1.9 (35.4)	5.5 (41.9)	10.1 (50.2)	13.2 (55.8)	15.2 (59.4)	15.1 (59.2)	11.4 (52.5)	6.5 (43.7)	1.7 (35.1)	−1.2 (29.8)	6.2 (43.2)
Record low °C (°F)	−21.6 (−6.9)	−19.8 (−3.6)	−19.2 (−2.6)	−4.0 (24.8)	−1.6 (29.1)	3.7 (38.7)	6.2 (43.2)	3.8 (38.8)	2.1 (35.8)	−5.3 (22.5)	−12.3 (9.9)	−17.8 (0.0)	−21.6 (−6.9)
Average precipitation mm (inches)	33.7 (1.33)	29.7 (1.17)	45.1 (1.78)	51.9 (2.04)	62.6 (2.46)	71.2 (2.80)	66.7 (2.63)	59.8 (2.35)	58.8 (2.31)	43.7 (1.72)	53.6 (2.11)	41.2 (1.62)	618.0 (24.33)
Average snowfall cm (inches)	12.0 (4.7)	8.8 (3.5)	6.4 (2.5)	0.8 (0.3)	0.0 (0.0)	0.0 (0.0)	0.0 (0.0)	0.0 (0.0)	0.0 (0.0)	0.0 (0.0)	5.0 (2.0)	14.1 (5.6)	47.1 (18.5)
Average precipitation days (≥ 1.0 mm)	6.1	5.9	8.1	7.7	8.5	9.3	8.5	8.2	7.0	5.9	7.8	6.9	89.9
Average relative humidity (%) (at 14:00)	72.8	65.1	57.0	51.7	52.8	53.4	50.7	51.1	56.2	61.8	71.2	74.5	59.9
Mean monthly sunshine hours	68.9	105.8	136.1	188.0	237.1	232.5	252.3	244.0	176.2	136.3	70.4	50.1	1,897.7
Percentage possible sunshine	26.2	37.9	38.6	47.7	53.5	52.1	55.8	57.8	48.4	41.8	25.9	20.3	42.2
Source: Central Institute for Meteorology and Geodynamics

== Names and etymology ==
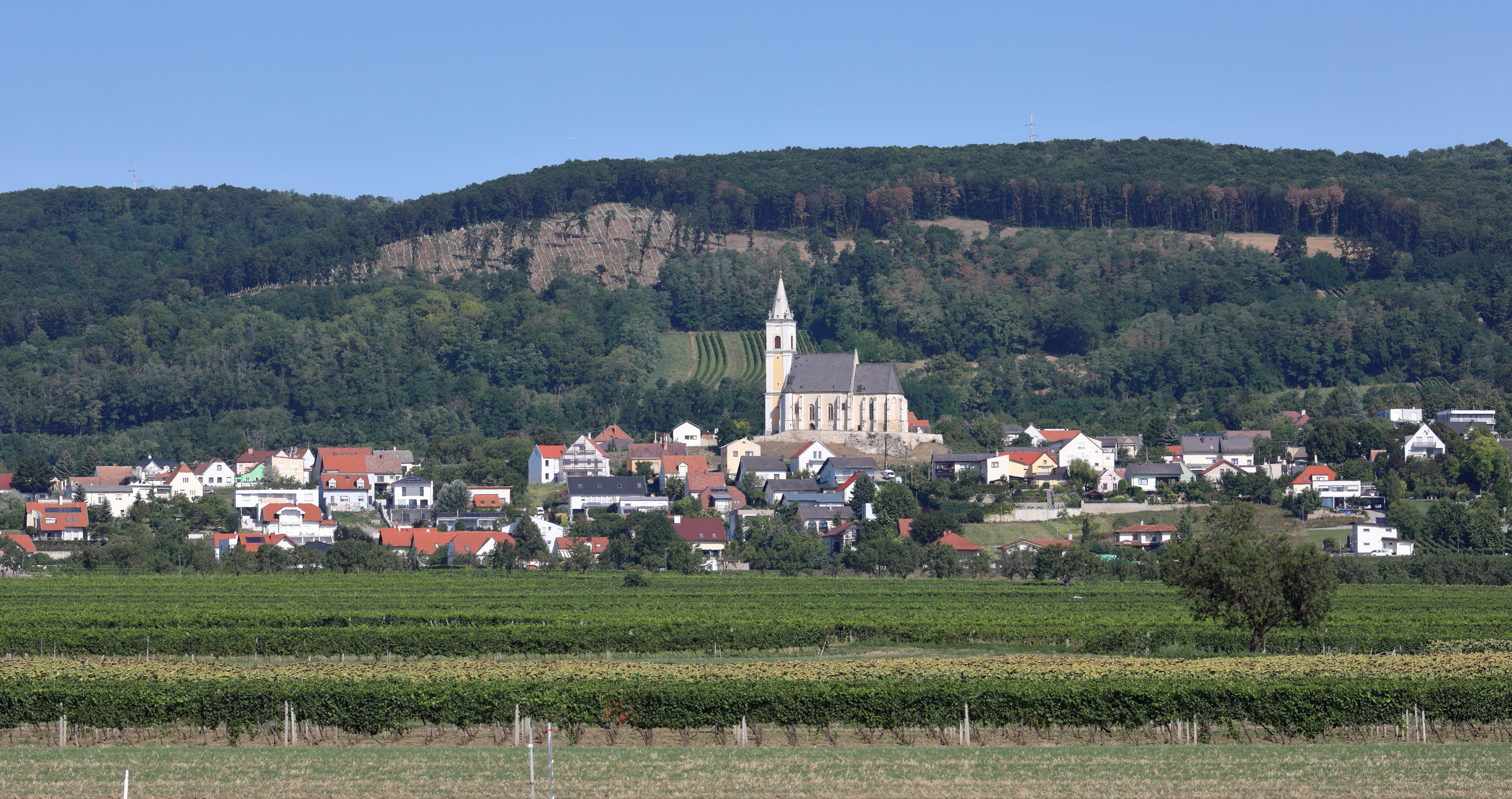
Kleinhöflein im Burgenland at the foot of the Leitha Mountains

The city's name means "Iron City" and was first recorded in 1118 as Castrum ferrum, referring to the history of iron mining and iron trade in the area. The first written mention of the town is from 1264 as "minor Mortin", matching the Hungarian name, Kismarton, which recalls Martin of Tours, the patron saint of the main church.

== History ==
Archaeological finds prove that the Eisenstadt area was already settled in the Hallstatt period. Celts and Romans settled somewhat later. During the Migration Period, the area was settled by different Germanic tribes and the Huns. Around 800, during the reign of Charlemagne, settlement by the Bavarii began. The territory became part of the Kingdom of Hungary in the 11th century.

The fortress built on the original earth works was destroyed by the troops of Margrave Leopold III of Austria. In 1241, it was destroyed by the Mongol invaders. In 1373, the town came into the possession of the Kanizsai family, who rebuilt the walls surrounding the town and built a fortress at the site of the present day castle between 1388 and 1392. In 1388, Eisenstadt was given the right to hold markets by Emperor Sigismund.

From 1440 Archduke Albert VI of Austria held the town as collateral for a loan. In 1451, Matthias Corvinus ceded it to Frederick III, Holy Roman Emperor in return for the Holy Crown of Hungary. Matthias Corvinus reconquered it by force in 1482, but Maximilian I acquired it again in 1490. It remained under Habsburg rule until 1622; however, the Ottoman Empire briefly conquered Kismarton in 1529 and 1532 during their advances on the city of Vienna (see Ottoman wars in Europe). It was destroyed by fire in 1589.

In 1648, it passed under the rule of the Esterházy family. These Hungarian princes permanently changed the face of the city due to their extensive construction, especially on their castle, Schloss Esterházy. During this period, the city was captured by the army of Imre Thököly in 1683, and it saw the defeat of the rebel kuruc army of Sándor Károlyi by the Habsburgs in 1704. It was again destroyed by fire in 1776.

The appointment of Joseph Haydn as the prince's Hofkapellmeister (court orchestra director, composing and performing music) began the great artistic period in the city's history. In 1809, Eisenstadt was occupied by French troops during the Napoleonic Wars; in 1897, it was joined to the railway network.

Until the end of World War I, it was the seat of Kismarton district in Sopron county in the Kingdom of Hungary. Without plebiscite, in 1921 the city and the entire Hungarian territory of Burgenland (with the exception of the city of Sopron and 11 other villages in which referendums were held) was annexed to Austria by the Saint-Germain and Trianon treaties. Since 30 April 1925, Eisenstadt has been the seat of the Burgenland state government and thus the state capital. During World War II, Eisenstadt was heavily bombarded. On 2 April 1945, it was captured by Soviet troops of the 3rd Ukrainian Front in the course of the Vienna Offensive, and the city remained under Soviet occupation until 1955. In 1960, it became the see of the Roman Catholic Diocese of Eisenstadt.

== Demographics ==
Historical population
Year	Pop.	±%
1869	6,696	—
1880	7,035	+5.1%
1890	7,351	+4.5%
1900	7,387	+0.5%
1910	7,073	−4.3%
1923	6,796	−3.9%
1934	8,897	+30.9%
1939	9,005	+1.2%
1951	7,568	−16.0%
1961	9,315	+23.1%
1971	10,062	+8.0%
1981	10,102	+0.4%
1991	10,349	+2.4%
2001	11,334	+9.5%
2011	13,101	+15.6%
2021	15,220	+16.2%
Source: Statistics Austria

The ethnic and linguistic structure of the population changed significantly after Burgenland was incorporated into Austria. In 1910, the proportion of the Magyar population was still around 27%; by 1934, however, the share of Hungarian-speaking residents had fallen to about 5%. On the one hand, this change can be attributed to the return of many Magyar civil servants, military personnel, and others to Hungary; on the other hand, it also reflects the inhabitants’ linguistic and national self-identification.

At the last census, Eisenstadt (excluding outlying districts) recorded a share of 2.7% Hungarian-speaking and 4.0% Croatian-speaking population (resident population with Austrian citizenship). The latter is mainly due to inward migration from surrounding Croatian-speaking or mixed-language municipalities over recent decades.

The confessional composition of the population also changed. The number of Evangelicals rose from 52 in 1890 to 493 in 1961. The number of Jews stood at 906 in 1836 and then declined steadily to 445 by 1923, with emigration occurring primarily toward Vienna. Of the more than 400 Jews in Eisenstadt, about 250 survived the Holocaust. Only two Jews from Eisenstadt returned after 1945.

As of 1 January 2025, the continuously growing provincial capital had a population of 16,118.

== Politics ==
The current mayor of Eisenstadt is Thomas Steiner (ÖVP).

The district council is composed as follows (as of 2022):

- Austrian People's Party (ÖVP): 17 seats
- Social Democratic Party of Austria (SPÖ): 8 seats
- Austrian Green Party (Grüne): 3 seats
- Freedom Party of Austria (FPÖ): 1 seat

The total annual city budget of Eisenstadt in 2021 is €42.256.600 with total expenditure of €42.255.800.

== Main sights ==
=== Secular buildings ===
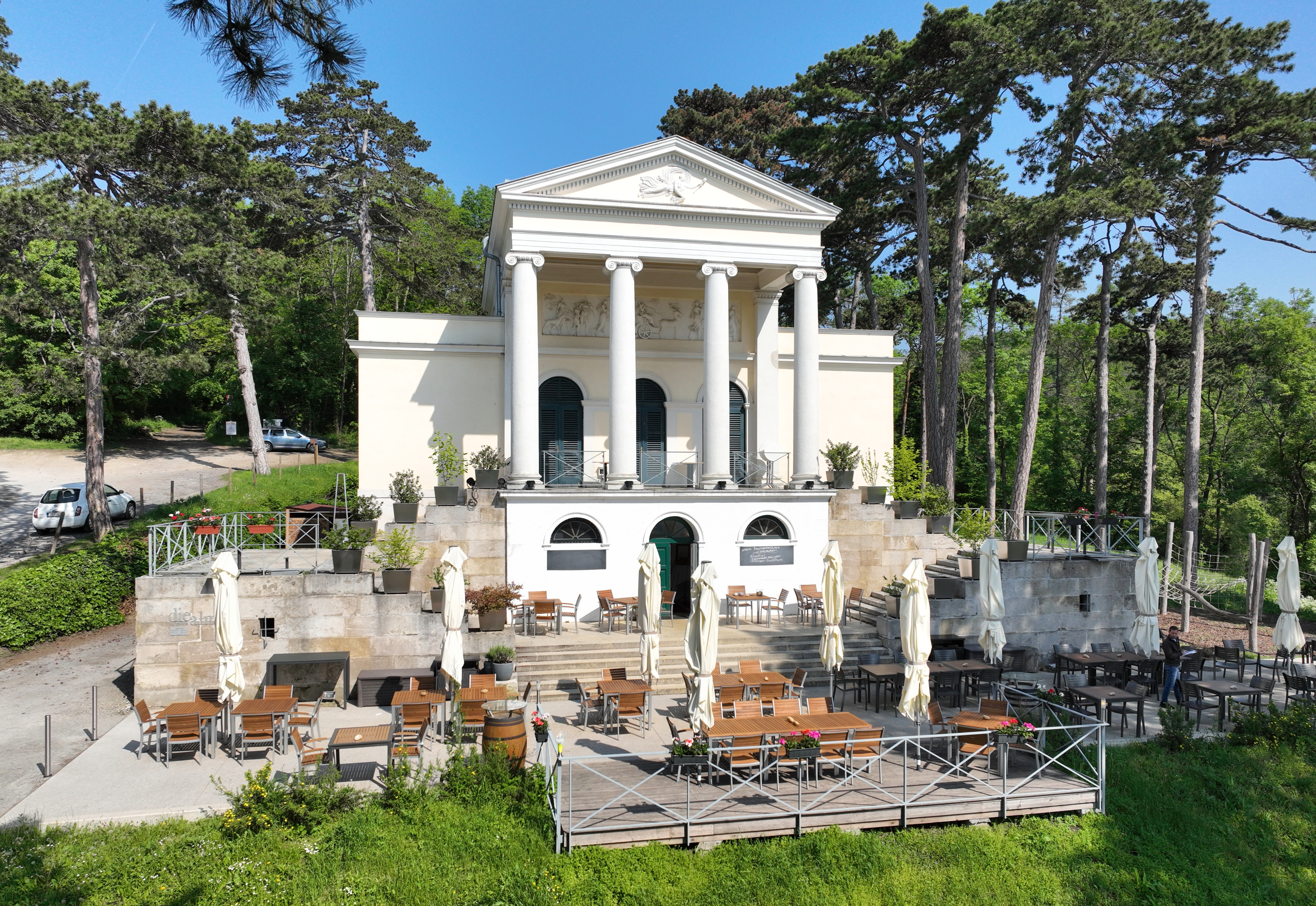
Gloriette

- Schloss Esterházy
  - Schlosspark
  - Orangerie
  - Leopoldinentempel
- Gloriette, the former Esterházy hunting lodge.
- City Hall
- Cathedral Bastion and Powder tower
- Martinkaserne, 19th-century military barracks

=== Religious buildings and districts ===
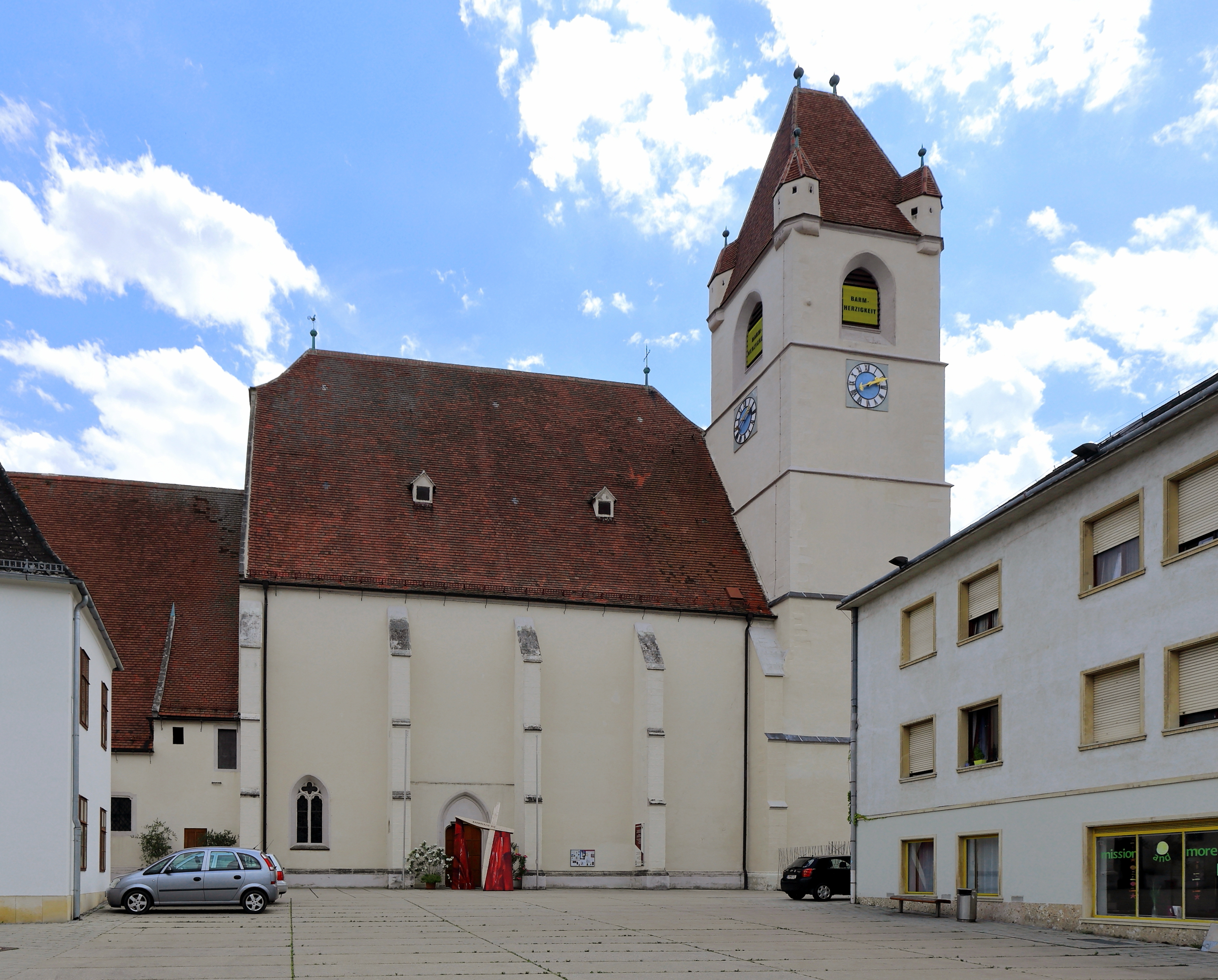
Eisenstadt Cathedral

- Bergkirche, housing Haydn's tomb
- Eisenstadt Cathedral, late Gothic church dedicated to Saint Martin
- Franziskanerkirche, baroque Franciscan church containing the crypt of the Esterházy family
- Krankenhaus Barmherzige Brüder and Barmherzigenkirche Hl. Antonius von Padua, baroque hospital and church dedicated to Anthony of Padua
- Jewish quarter (1732–1938, 1945–)
  - Private synagogue located within the Austrian Jewish Museum
  - Old and new Jewish cemetery

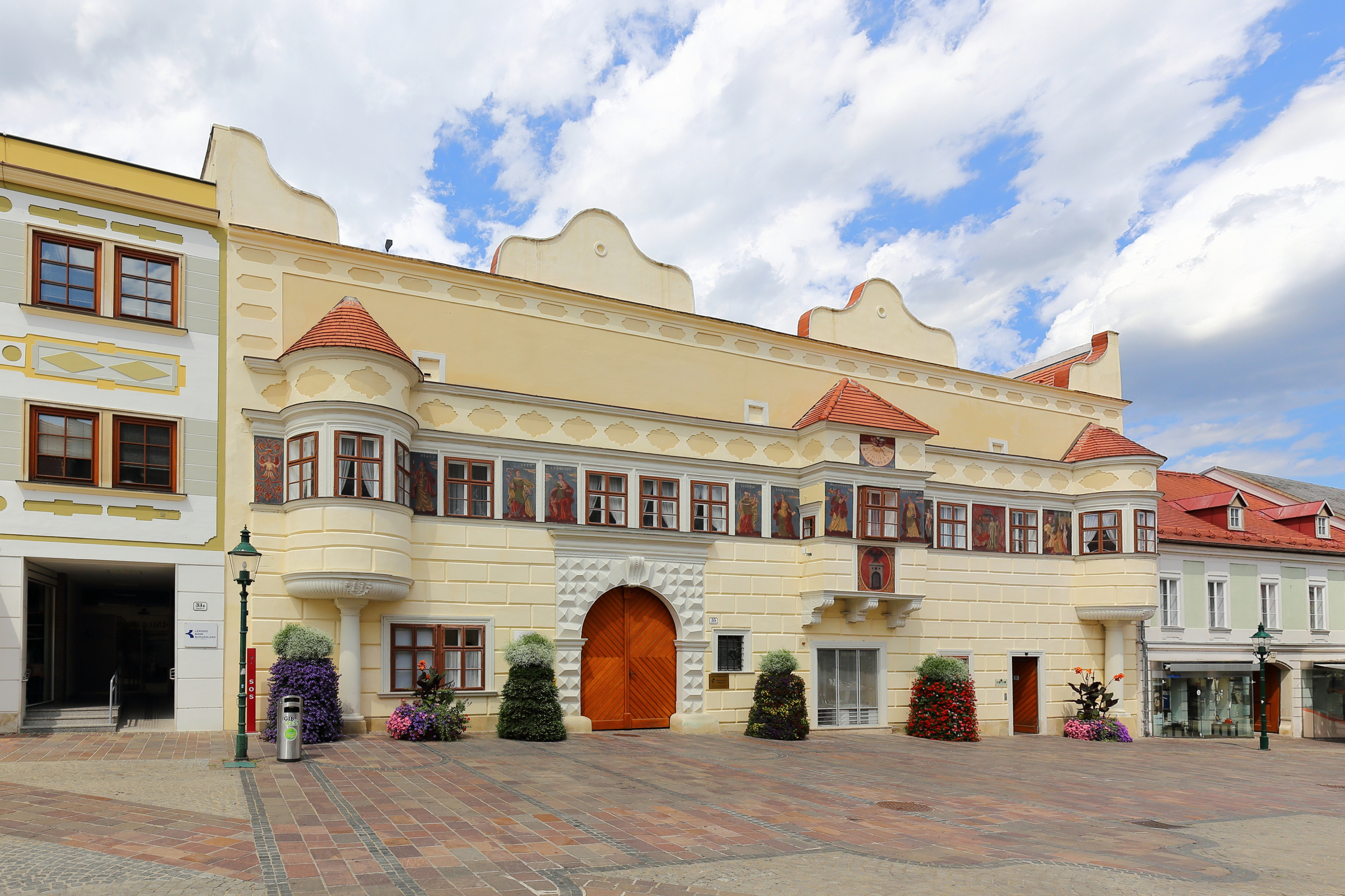
City Hall

=== Museums ===
- Haydnmuseum, a museum dedicated to Joseph Haydn, who lived in the building between 1766 and 1778.
- Landesmuseum, regional museum
- Austrian Jewish Museum
- Diözesanmuseum, museum of the local Roman Catholic diocese
- Feuerwehrmuseum, museum of the fire department

== Education ==
Eisenstadt is the seat of the university of applied sciences FH Burgenland, the college of education PH Burgenland, and the music school Joseph-Haydn-Privathochschule Burgenland.

== Transport ==
The Pannonia Railway had a station in the community.

== Culture ==
Eisenstadt formerly hosted a Joseph Haydn festival, the Haydn Festspiele, a viniculture festival, the Fest der 1000 Weine, and a tournament of the World Athletics Continental Tour, the Austrian Open.

== Twin towns – sister cities ==
Eisenstadt is twinned with:

- Bad Kissingen, Bavaria, Germany, (1978)
- Colmar, Haut-Rhin, Grand Est, France, (1983)
- Sanuki, Japan, (1993)
- Sopron, Hungary, (2002)

== Notable people ==
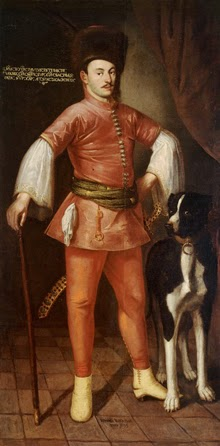
Paul I, 1655

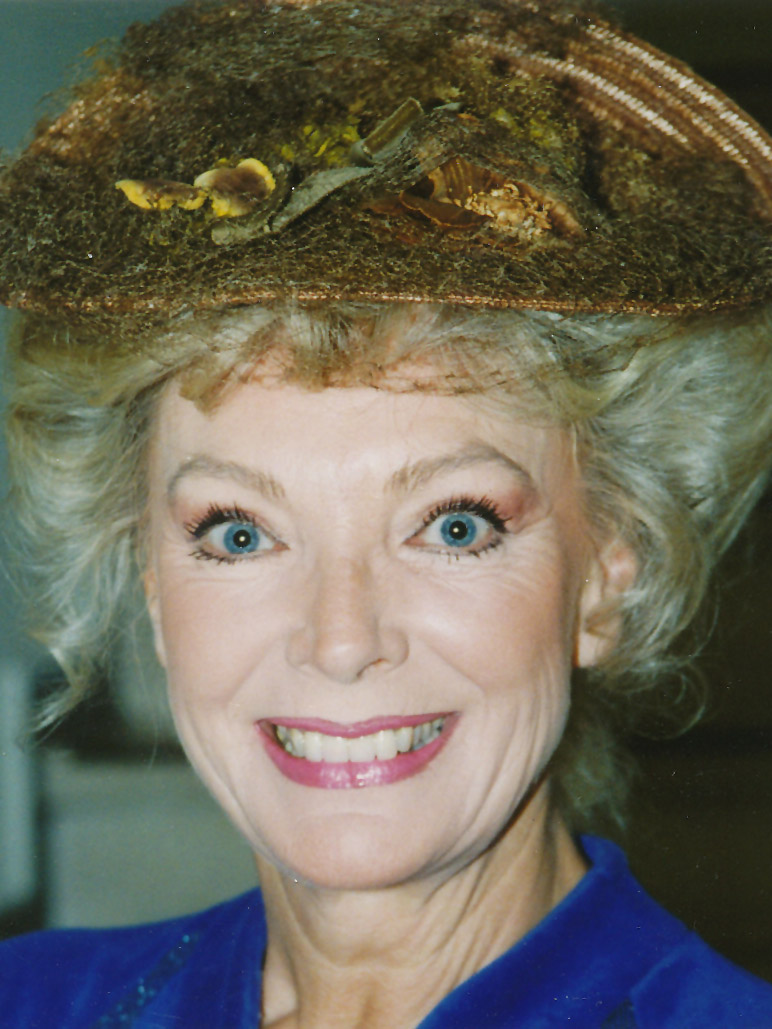
Maria Perschy, 2010

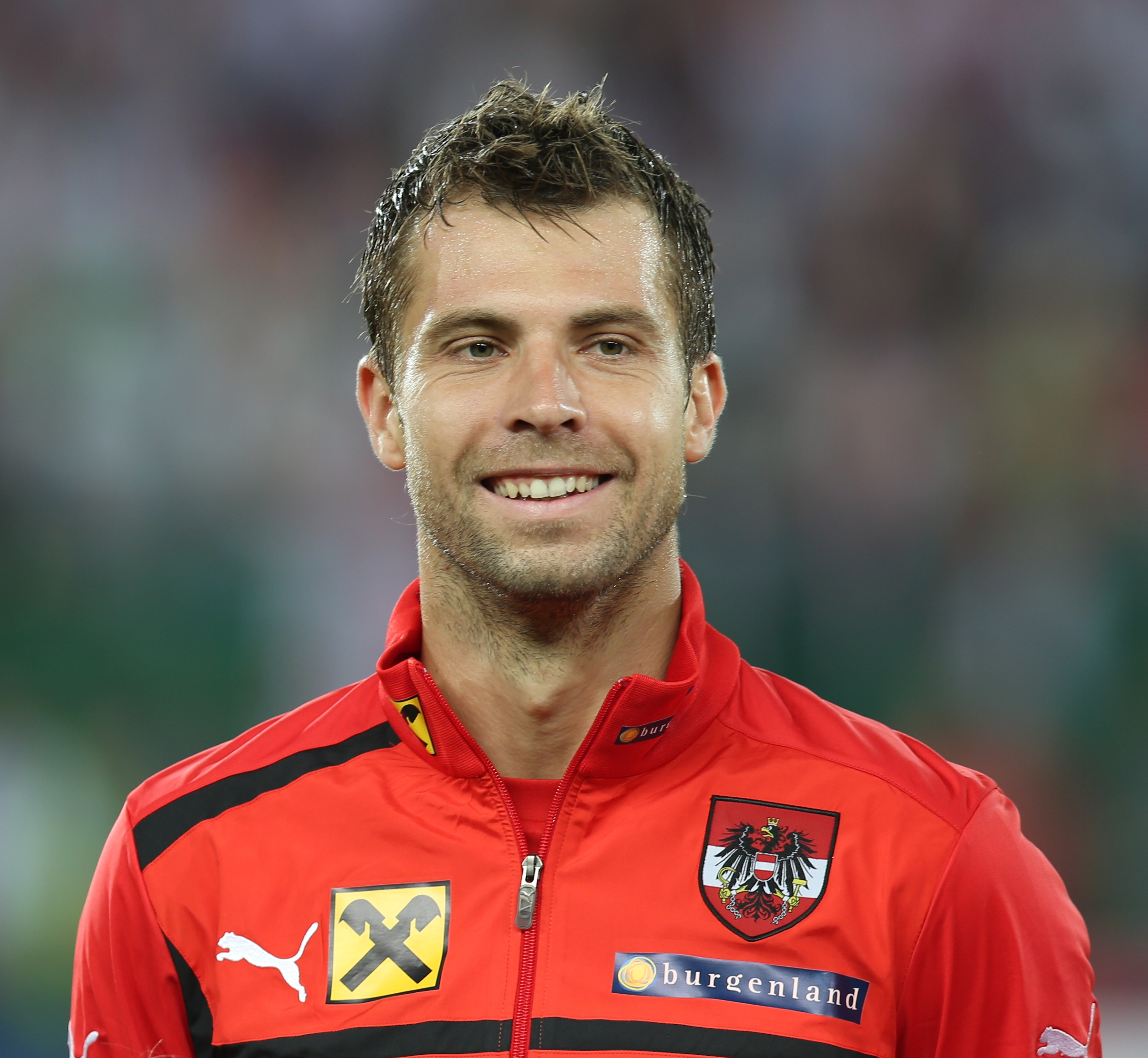
Andreas Ivanschitz, 2012

=== Natives ===
- Paul I, Prince Esterházy (1635–1713), the first Prince Esterházy of Galántha from 1687 to 1713,
- Paul II Anton, Prince Esterházy, (1711–1762), a Hungarian prince, soldier and patron of music
- Isaiah Berlin (1719 or 1725 – 1799), a German Talmudist and rabbi.
- Joseph Franz Weigl (1740–1820), cellist, father of Joseph Weigl
- Joseph Weigl (1766–1846), composer and conductor
- Friedrich Bridgetower (1782-1813), composer, cellist, brother of George Bridgetower
- Ferdinand von Rosenzweig (1812–1892), an Austrian military officer and architect, worked in Mexico.
- Josef Hyrtl (1810–1894), anatomist.
- Ferenc Markó (1832–1874), a Hungarian painter of landscapes; usually with figures
- Moritz Benedikt (1835–1920), neurologist
- Sándor Wolf (1871-1946), wine trader and collector of antiquities
- Ferenc Farkas de Kisbarnak (1892–1980), Chief Scout of the Hungarian Boy Scouts
- Gyula Farkas (1894–1958), a Hungarian literary historian and Finno-Ugric linguist
- Stefan Billes, (DE Wiki) (1909, Kleinhöflein – 2002), politician (SPÖ).
- Josef Kirchknopf, (DE Wiki) (born 1930, Kleinhöflein), politician (ÖVP)
- Martin Vukovich (born 1944), diplomat
- Maria Perschy (1938–2004), film and TV actress
- Rudolf Simek (born 1954), an Austrian philologist and religious studies scholar
- Andrea Fraunschiel (1955–2019), politician (ÖVP), and local mayor
- Johann Luif (born 1959, Kleinhöflein), an Austrian politician and military officer.

==== Sport ====
- Johann Dihanich (born 1958), football player, played over 330 games and 10 for Austria
- Thomas Mandl (born 1979), football player, played over 250 games and 13 for Austria
- Michael Mörz (born 1980), football player, played over 322 games and 12 for Austria
- Andreas Ivanschitz (born 1983), football player, played over 420 games and 69 for Austria
- Philipp Hosiner (born 1989), an Austrian footballer who has played over 280 games and 5 for Austria
- Marko Daňo (born 1994), Slovak ice hockey player, won team bronze at the 2022 Winter Olympics

=== Other residents ===
Joseph Haydn, 1791

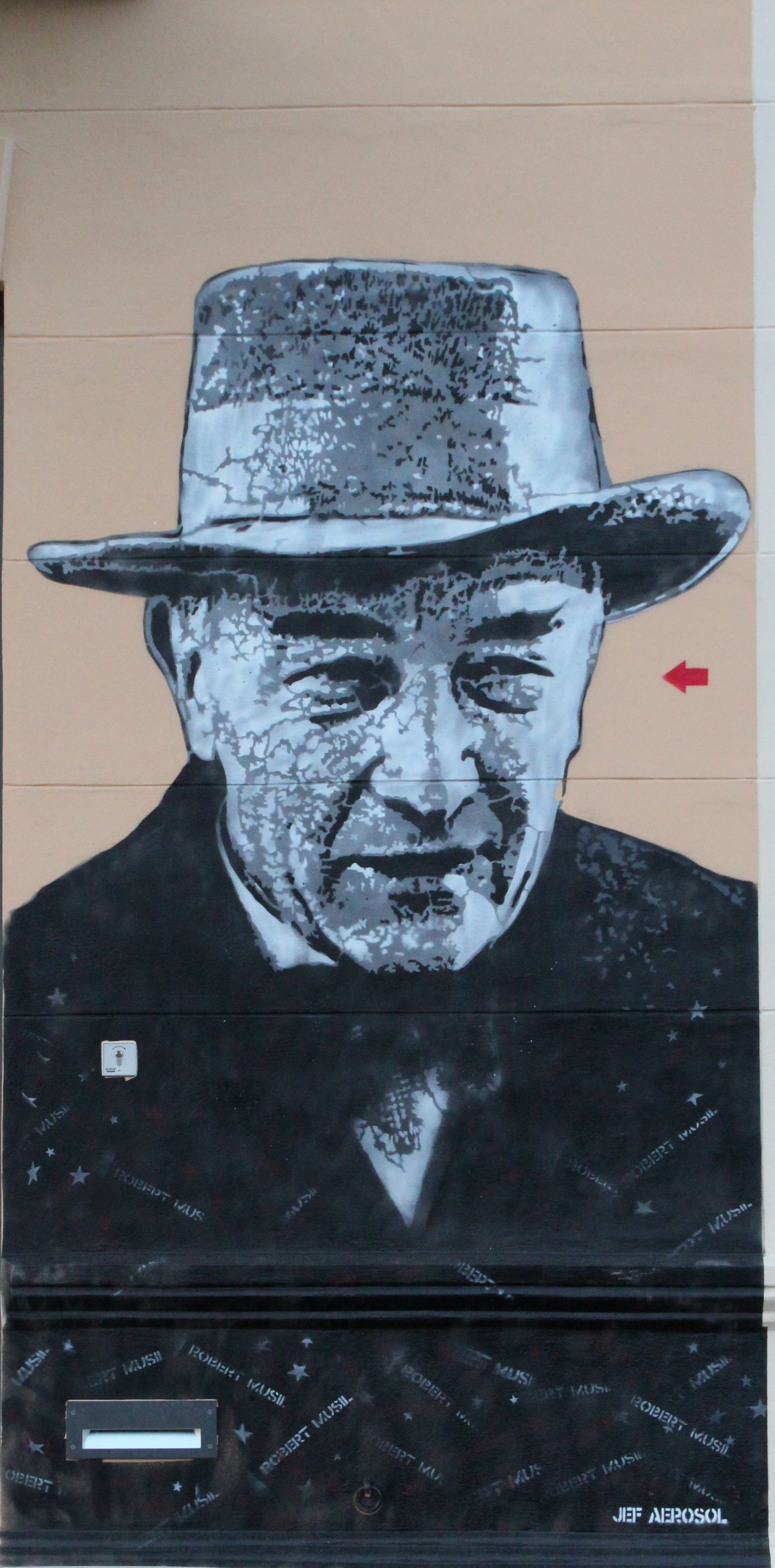
depiction of Robert Musil in Musil-Haus, Klagenfurt

- Mordecai Mokiach (ca. 1650–1724), a Jewish Sabbatean prophet and Messiah claimant
- Samson Wertheimer (1658–1724), chief rabbi of Hungary and Moravia, and rabbi of Eisenstadt.
- Meir Eisenstadt (1670–1744) rabbi of the Siebengemeinden, died locally
- Joseph Haydn (1732–1809), musician, born in Rohrau.
- Ignaz Pleyel (1757–1831), composer, from 1772 he became the pupil of Joseph Haydn in Eisenstadt.
- Akiva Eiger (1761–1837), rabbi and champion of Orthodox Judaism.
- Adam Liszt (1776–1827), musician, father of Franz Liszt, played cello under the direction of Joseph Haydn.
- Johann Nepomuk Hummel (1778–1837), an Austrian composer and virtuoso pianist.
- Leopold Löw (1811–1875), born in Černá Hora, Moravia, studied at the yeshiva of Eisenstadt
- Samuel Löw Brill (1814–1897), rabbi and Talmudical scholar; born in Budapest; attended yeshiva
- Isaac Hirsch Weiss (1815–1905), talmudist; born at Velké Meziříčí, Moravia; studied at yeshiva
- Azriel Hildesheimer (1820–1899), German rabbi, founded Torah im Derech Eretz; from 1851 Rabbi of Eisenstadt
- Markus Horovitz (1844–1915), German rabbi and historian; rabbinical studies at the yeshiva
- Aaron Wise (1844–1896), rabbi, born in Eger, Hungary, studied at yeshiva; father of Stephen Samuel Wise
- Emanuel Schreiber (1852–1932), American rabbi, born in Lipník nad Bečvou, Moravia; attended local yeshiva
- Robert Musil (1880–1942), an Austrian philosophical writer.
- Fritz Spiegl (1926–2003), musician, journalist, broadcaster and humorist, attended the Gymnasium in Eisenstadt
- Paul Iby (born 1935), a reformist bishop at the Roman Catholic Diocese of Eisenstadt

=== As a surname ===
Eisenstadt (also Ajzenstat, Eisenstaedter, Asch, etc.), a Jewish surname, derives from this city. Some people with this surname or its variants include:

- Alfred Eisenstaedt {1898–1995), an American photographer and photojournalist.
- Meir Eisenstadt (ca. 1670 in Poznań – 1744 in Eisenstadt) author of rabbinic literature.
- Shmuel Eisenstadt (1923–2010), Israeli sociologist
- Stuart E. Eizenstat (born 1943), an American diplomat and attorney.
- Moses Asch (1905–1986), an American recording engineer and record executive
