= Eisenstadt Cathedral =

Church building in Burgenland, Austria

Coordinates: 47°50′43″N 16°31′31″E

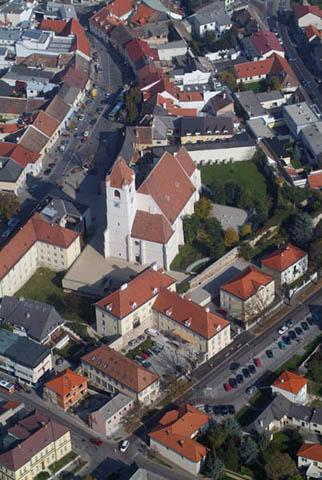
Eisenstadt Cathedral from the air

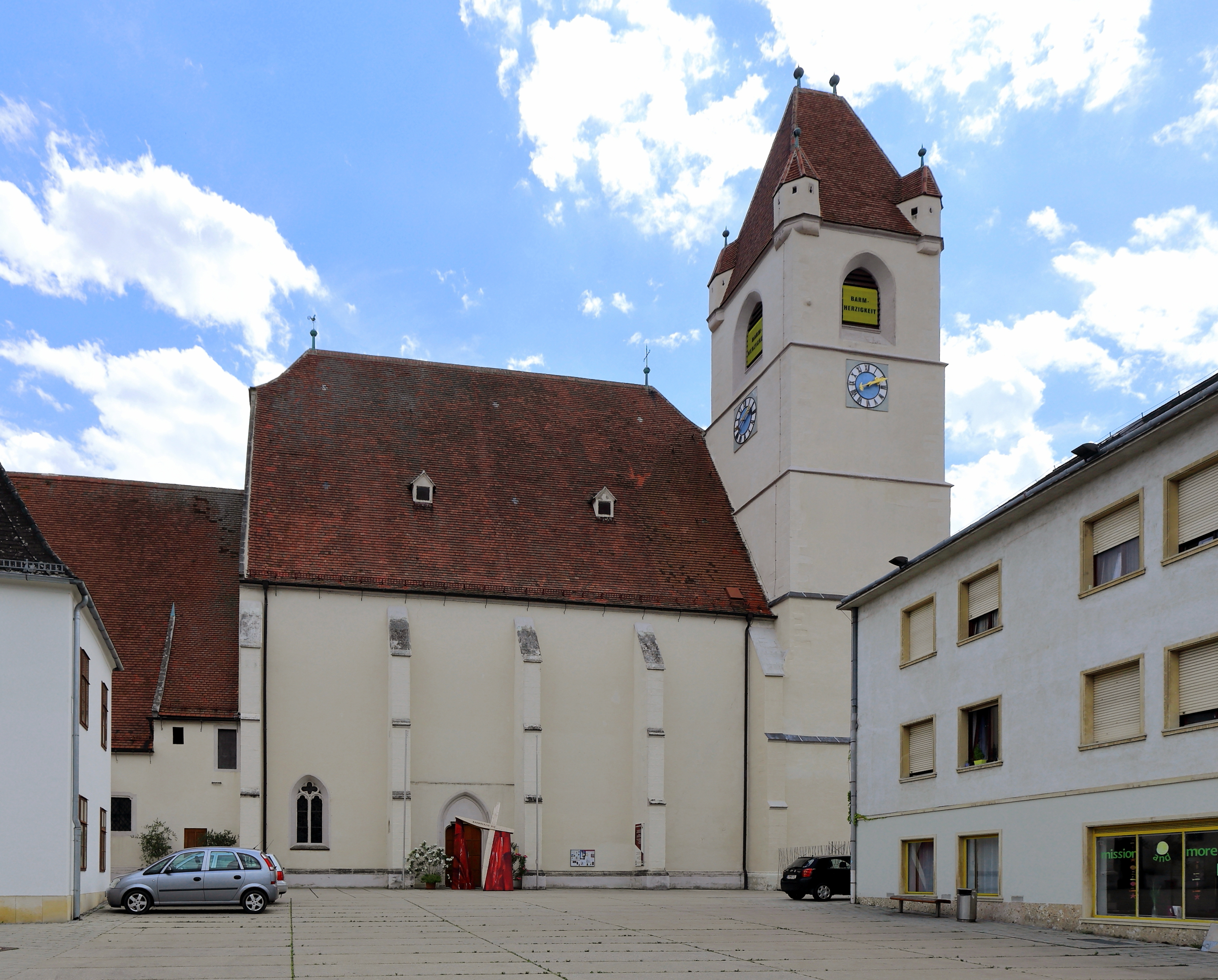
The cathedral from the cathedral square

Eisenstadt Cathedral, otherwise St. Martin's Cathedral, previously St. Martin's Church (German: Dom St. Martin in Eisenstadt), is a Roman Catholic cathedral in Eisenstadt, Burgenland, Austria, dedicated to Saint Martin. It has been the seat of the Bishop of Eisenstadt since the creation of the diocese in 1960.

== History ==
The first reference to a chapel dedicated to Saint Martin of Tours occurs in 1264, when Eisenstadt received its original name, in Latin: minor Martin, in German: Kleinmartinsdorf and in Hungarian: Kismarton ("Little Martin's village").

From this chapel there are still remains of a Romanesque foundation in the area of the present choir. In the 13th century the chapel was extended by the addition of an early Gothic choir. In the 14th century a chapel for lay people was added. In 1460 the church was rebuilt under the town captain Johann Siebenhirter as a fortified or defensive church, as an attack by the Turks was expected after the Fall of Constantinople in 1453.

The Gothic building was finished in 1522. After the great fire of 1589 almost 30 years passed before construction of the severely damaged church took place, between 1610 and 1629.

In 1777 a large altarpiece by Stefan Dorffmeister was added, depicting "The Transfiguration of St. Martin". In the following year the Viennese organ builder Malleck installed an organ to instructions from Joseph Haydn.

After the creation of the Diocese of Eisenstadt, St. Martin's Church was elevated to the rank of cathedral in 1960. Saint Martin became the patron saint of the diocese and the Land. Under Bishop Stephan László in 1960 the interior and windows were renewed.

In 2003 under Bishop Paul Iby the cathedral was remodelled to designs by the architects Lichtblau-Wagner. The service of consecration on 12 April 2003 and the dedication of the altar marked the end of the renovation after a year's construction work.

== Works of art ==
The architecture of the interior was altered in 1960 to plans by Jakob Adelhart. The windows of the presbytery reflect the theme of Christ the King and are by Franz Deéd. The windows of the nave depict motifs from the Revelation of St John the Divine and are by Margret Bilger.

In 1980 Thomas Resetarits created a figure of the Virgin of Mercy, which was set on the main portal. Gilbert Bretterbauer made the carpet in 2003, which matches the colours of the windows. The altar space was re-designed by Brigitte Kowanz in 2003, and is marked by its use of glass.

== Church music ==
The cathedral is famous for its church music. Concerts of the annual Haydn Festival also take place here.

The organ was built in 1778 by Johann Gottfried Malleck from Vienna thanks to an endowment by the widow Theresia Frigl. A new build was necessary as the old organ had been badly damaged during earlier repairs. Significant alterations to the organ were carried out in 1944 by the organ builders Karl Schuke of Berlin: the range of the pedals and of the first manual were extended, and a register was added. The last restoration, also by Schuke, took place in 1973, during which all the additions from 1944 were removed and re-constructed, together with the pedal windchest, the pedal woodwind register and the façade. A particular feature of the instrument is that while it still retains Baroque elements, there is much that anticipates the sound aesthetic which finally prevailed in the early 19th century.
