= Austrian Jewish Museum =

Coordinates: 47.84627°N 16.51657°E

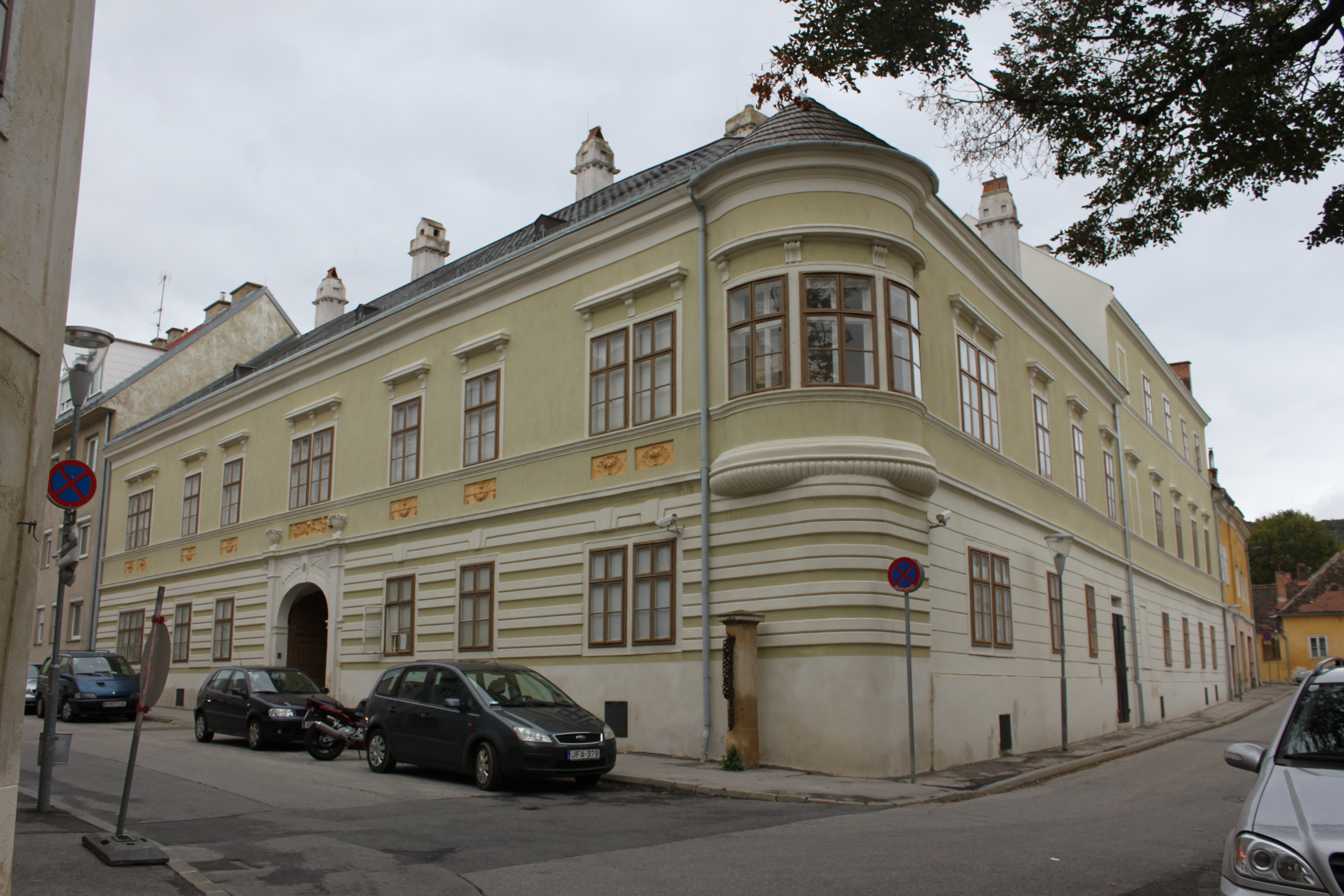
Austrian Jewish Museum

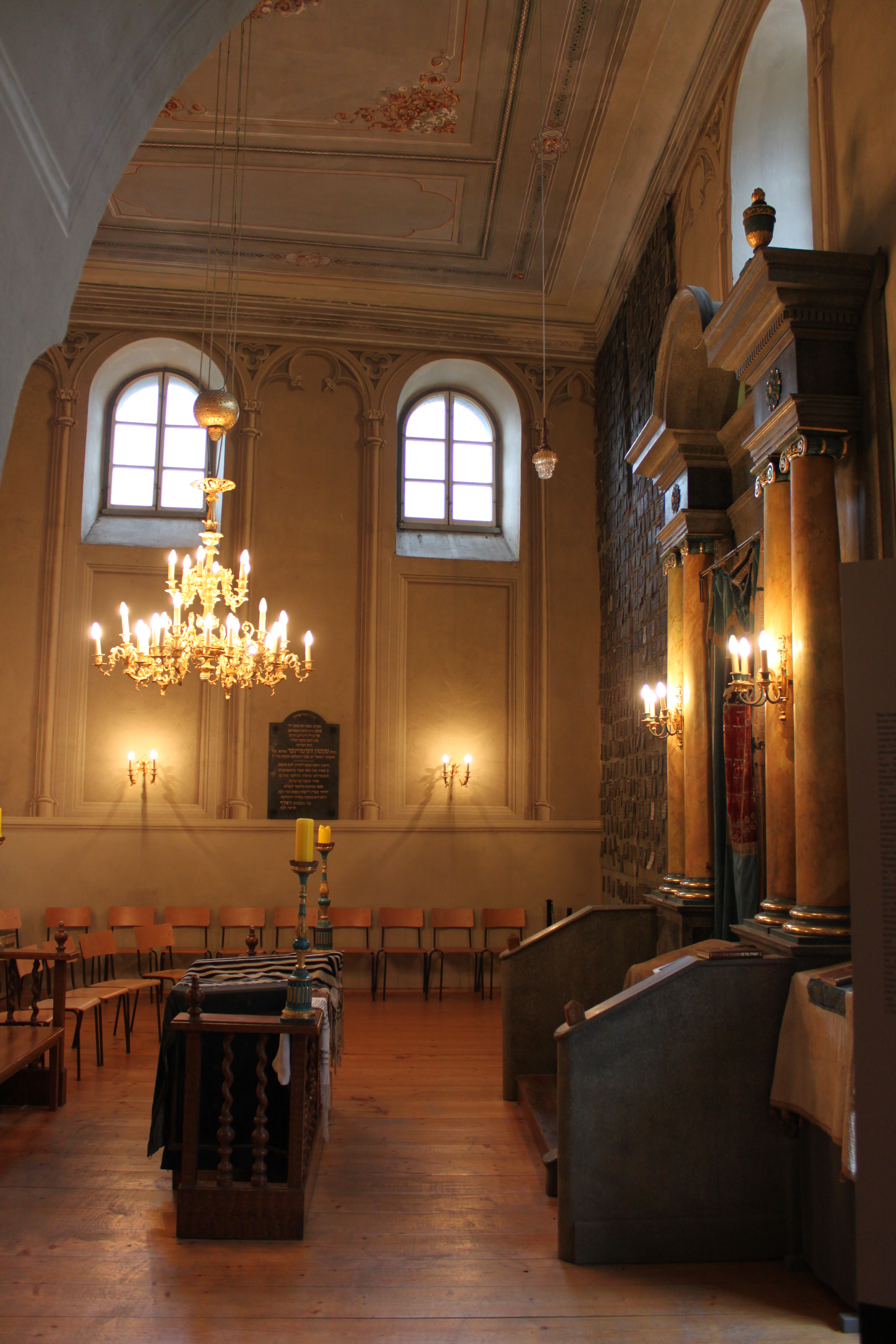
Samson Wertheimer´s private synagogue

The Austrian Jewish Museum is located on Unterbergstraße 6 in Eisenstadt, Austria. The museum was founded in 1972 by Kurt Schubert, and was the first Jewish museum to open in Austria after 1945.

== History ==
Schubert was a Catholic professor who chaired the Judaic studies department at the University of Vienna during the post-World War II era. Due to the climate in Austria following the war, many projects regarding Judaism were private enterprises, as was the museum. It was situated in Eisenstadt, rather than Vienna, due to budgetary constraints. It catered to an academic clientele, rather than the general public, and initially were focused around annual symposiums held by the museum. Its creation paved the way for later museums in Austria dealing with Jewish topics, such as the Jewish Museum Vienna.

The museum is housed today in the Wertheimerhaus, also called the Wertheimer'schen Freihaus, which was commissioned and financed by Esterhazy family and built by Samson Wertheimer in 1719, who earned the commission through service to the aristocratic family. Wertheimer was an important businessman and served both the court in Vienna and the high rabbi in Hungary. This house was built in Eisenstadt during his own service as a high rabbi and housed a private synagogue with a separate room for women only. The synagogue is part of the museum exhibition.
