= St. Georgen am Leithagebirge =

Town in Burgenland, Austria

Coordinates: 47°51′11″N 16°32′52″E

St. Georgen am Leithagebirge (Lajtaszentgyörgy; Svetojurje) is a town in Burgenland, Austria. It is one of the three districts of Eisenstadt.
