= Edelstal =

- Municipality
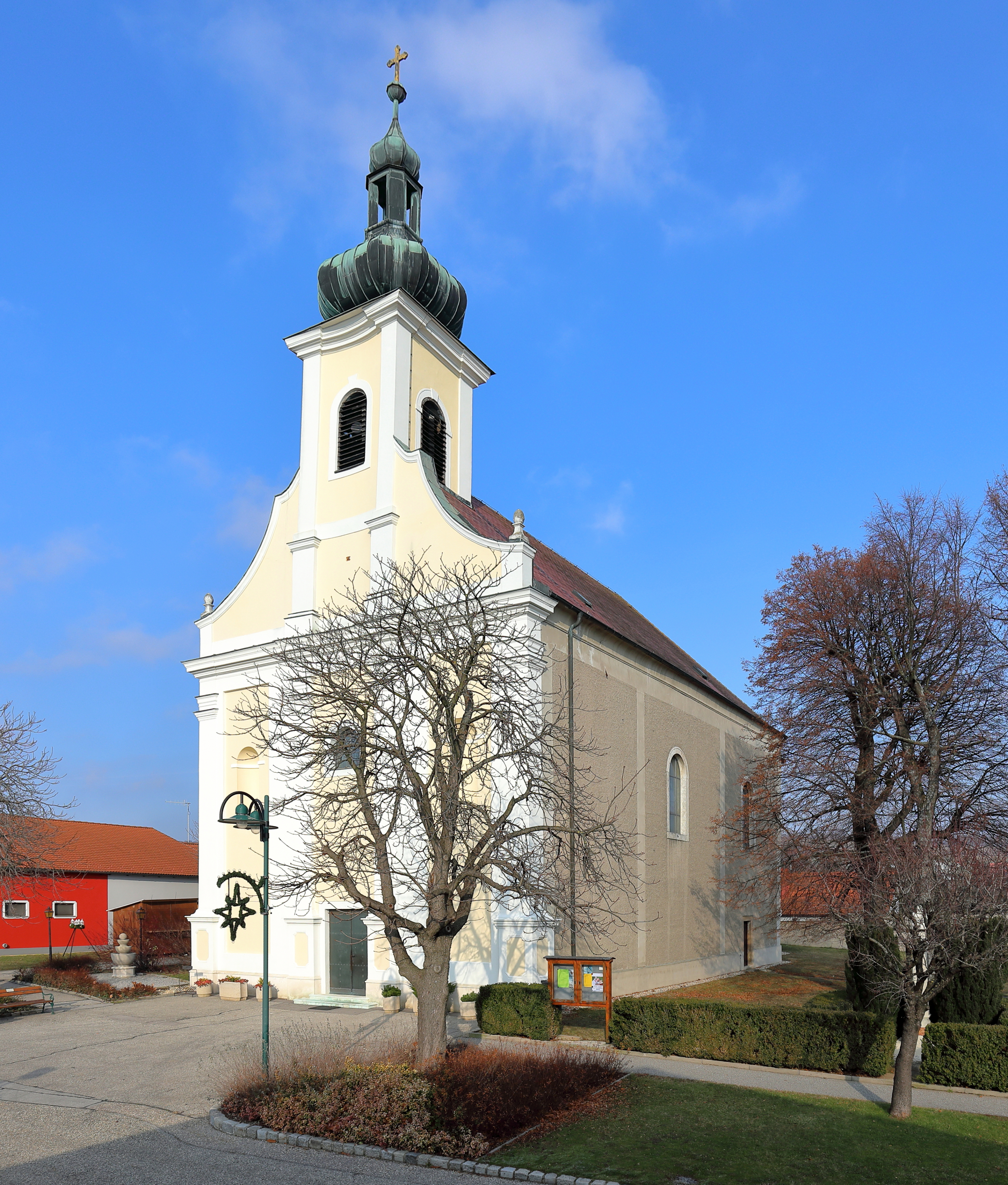
- Church of Saint Stephen, King of Hungary

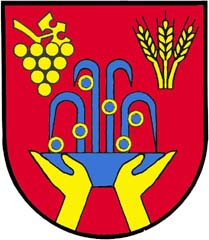
- Coat of arms

- Location within Austria
- Coordinates: 48°6′N 16°59′E
- Country: Austria
- State: Burgenland
- District: Neusiedl am See

Government
  - Mayor: Gerald Handig (ÖVP)

Area
  - Total: 5.9 km^{2} (2.3 sq mi)

Population (2018-01-01)
  - Total: 747
  - Density: 130/km^{2} (330/sq mi)
- Time zone: UTC+1 (CET)
  - Summer (DST): UTC+2 (CEST)
- Postal code: 2413
- Website: www.gemeinde-edelstal.at

Edelstal (Hungarian: Nemesvölgy) is a township in the district of Neusiedl am See, in the Austrian state of Burgenland.

== History ==
There was a 9th-century Avar settlement on its borders, it is near the Roman fortress Carnuntum.

The town was destroyed in 1529 and 1683 by the Turks.

Before the Treaty of Trianon it was in the Rajka district (Hungarian: Jaras) of Moson county (comitatus) in the Kingdom of Hungary.

== Population ==
Historical population
Year	Pop.	±%
1869	644	—
1880	667	+3.6%
1890	683	+2.4%
1900	702	+2.8%
1910	759	+8.1%
1923	705	−7.1%
1934	677	−4.0%
1939	649	−4.1%
1951	690	+6.3%
1961	625	−9.4%
1971	573	−8.3%
1981	530	−7.5%
1991	544	+2.6%
2001	607	+11.6%
2011	615	+1.3%

== Personalities ==
In 1785 the List (later Liszt) family moved from here to Kittsee (Köpcsény), Adam Liszt (the composer's father) was born here.

== Sights ==
It has a Roman Catholic church dating from 1740 dedicated to Saint Stephen.

== Economy ==
The mineral water from the nearby Römerquelle springs has been bottled since 1890.

== Politics ==
The township's mayor is Anton Moritz of the Sozialdemokratische Partei Österreichs (SPÖ), the vice-mayor is Gerald Handig of the Österreichische Volkspartei (ÖVP) and the chief civil servant is Ulrike Ingrid Handig.

In the local council of thirteen seats, the SPÖ holds seven seats, the ÖVP five, and the Freiheitliche Partei Österreichs (FPÖ) one.
