= Adam Liszt =

Father of composer and pianist Franz Liszt

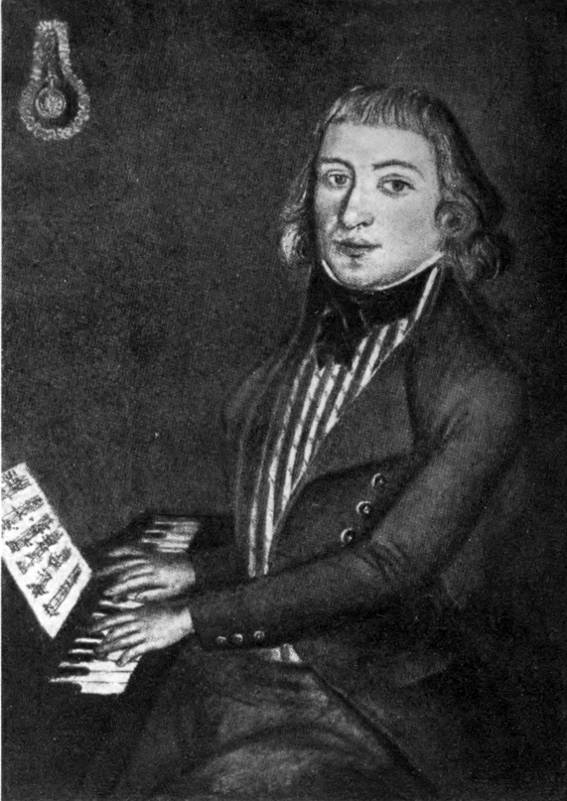
Adam Liszt in January 1817

Adamus List (Hungarian: Liszt Ádám; 16 December 1776 – 28 August 1827) was the father of composer and pianist Franz Liszt.

== Family background ==
As the second child of Georg Adam Liszt and Katharina (née Baumann), he was born in Nemesvölgy (today Edelstal, Austria), a village close to the Austrian border in the Kingdom of Hungary. His family was partly of Danube Swabian German descent. There are Germanic, Slavic and Magyar claims of the Liszt family. They lived in Márcz, Nagymarton and also Malacka, Kingdom of Hungary (today Marz, Mattersburg in Austria and Malacky in Slovakia).

Georg was in service for the Hungarian Nikolaus II, Prince Esterházy and both he and his son, Adam, were Hungarian citizens. The family lived mostly in the German-speaking parts of Hungary, which is why they had only rudimentary knowledge of Hungarian. Franz tried to learn the common tongue of his kingdom in the 1870s, but in spite of his great language skills he could not reach fluency level.

In his youth, Adam changed his surname "List" to the spelling "Liszt", according to Hungarian pronunciation. In his lifetime, Latin, not Hungarian, was the administrative language of the multi-ethnic Kingdom of Hungary, hence the recorded Latinised name "Adamus". After the great success of his son Franz, the father Georg also started to use the surname Liszt in the 1820s. Other family members also adapted this form, e.g. Adam's brother, Eduard, father of Franz von Liszt.

== Youth with musical career ==
As a teenager, Liszt played cello in the House of Eszterházy summer orchestra under the direction of Joseph Haydn. He was also an amateur pianist, and played the organ and violin and sang in a choir. His brother Eduard and one sister Barbara also showed great musical talents, as did their father Georg, who worked as an organist and played the piano and violin, but they had few resources for musical education other than within the family. After graduating from the Archigymnasium Regium Posoniense (today Gamča, Slovakia), in Pressburg (Pozsony, today's Bratislava), Liszt entered the Franciscan Order, but two years later, by his petition in 1797, was released from the order. He still kept a close relationship with the order, which probably gave him the inspiration to name his son Franz.

== Adult work life ==
An attempt by Liszt to continue as a student of philosophy at the Royal Academy in Pressburg (today Bratislava) ended in the first year due to financial reasons. He had to look for a job, and in 1798 became a clerk at the Esterházy estate in Fraknóváralja (today Forchtenstein, Austria). After two years, Liszt was transferred to Kapuvár where he was missing the musical atmosphere at Kismarton (today Eisenstadt, Austria). He started to compose music and dedicate it to the Prince in order to be transferred back to the Western part of Sopron County. Only in 1805 did he finally succeed in getting a job at the court in Kismarton. The years in Kismarton were his happy years. In his spare time, he played cello in the orchestra led by Johann Nepomuk Hummel, the successor of Haydn, and had the opportunity to work with many musicians who came to Kismarton to perform, including Cherubini and Beethoven. This happy time ended when Liszt was transferred to the Esterházy estate of Doborján (today Raiding, Austria) in 1809, as an overseer of the herd of about 50,000 sheep (Rentmeister der Fürstlich Esterházyschen Schäferei). Doborján, only 30 miles from Kismarton, was a rather provincial place.

== Marriage ==
While visiting his father in Nagymarton (today Mattersburg, Austria) in the summer of 1810, Liszt met Anna Lager, daughter of baker Matthias Lager (1715–1796) and his second wife Francisca Lager, nee Schumann (1751–1797), who had recently moved from Vienna to Nagymarton. Their marriage took place in the parish of Lók (today Unterfrauenhaid, Austria) on 11 January 1811.

The only child of the couple, Franz Liszt, was born on 22 October 1811. Liszt's father Georg wrote to prince Esterházy in 1812 that Adam had three more children, but there is no other documentation about this, and it seems unlikely.

== Raising Franz Liszt ==
At his house in Doborján, Liszt staged chamber concerts. When Franz was 5, Adam started to teach him music. When his fame grew, sponsors could finance private education in Vienna for the young Franz. Franz's father stayed close to his son throughout his travels to Vienna and Paris, where they settled in 1823. The purpose was to let Franz study at the famous Conservatoire de Paris, but Cherubini told them that foreigners were not admitted. (Long after this piece of unintentional satire, Liszt would always scorn the conservatoires and their products). So Liszt continued to teach his son, with a rigid schedule of practicing Bach and other composers on the piano, with transposition of fugues and other daily technique improving exercises. After resigning from the Esterhazys' service Liszt spent most of his time as the manager of his son's career, with tours in many European countries. Franz found his father's supervision quite demanding. (He may also have become the main breadwinner through giving lessons and concerts). Liszt was a skillful business manager. It is possible that the father wanted the opportunities for his son that service with the Esterhazys had blocked for him. Liszt secured him lessons with Paer (composition), Salieri (singing) and, mainly, Czerny (piano). Liszt had known Czerny and Beethoven from his own musical days. Through Czerny, Liszt secured his son a meeting with Beethoven and Czerny seems to have persuaded his master to go to a concert where the young man was playing. Franz was devastated by his father's death and withdrew to a monastery for a time. His mother, Anna Lager came to look after him in Paris where she remained until her death in the 1860s. He soon became an established performer and teacher who was able to introduce Chopin to the musical world on his arrival in Paris in 1830.

The elder Liszt was the main influence on Franz in his early years, as both teacher and manager. Franz's full musical maturity was reached after his father died, when he heard the works of such composers as Mendelssohn, Schubert and Schumann. The big influence on his performing style after his father's death came from his meetings with the forty-year-old Paganini. Though he always honored the memory of Adam Liszt, who had been accused by the French gutter press of exploiting the child prodigy, he never visited his grave at Boulogne-sur-Mer.

== Death ==
Liszt died in 1827 in Boulogne-sur-Mer at the age of 50 when Franz was 15 years old. The two were staying at a retreat centre for Franz to rest after a physician's order; however, the father became fatally ill with typhoid fever, died, and was buried there. Franz composed a funeral piece for his father's funeral service.

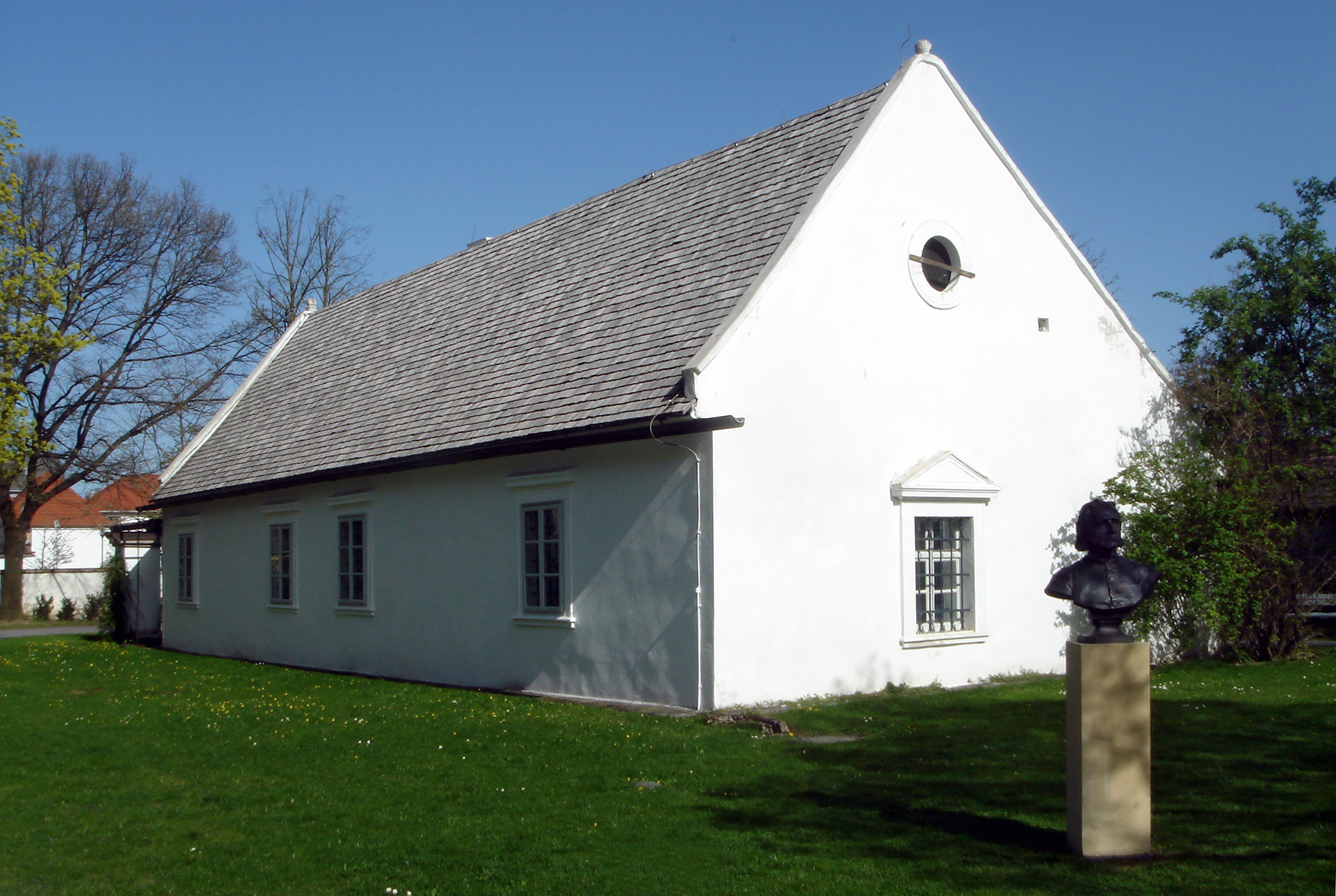
The house in Raiding, birthplace of Franz Liszt

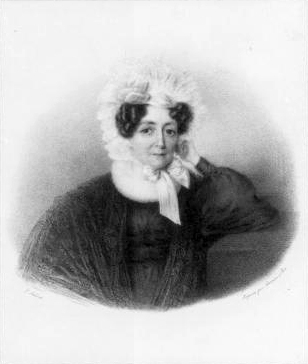
Maria Anna Lager, Adam's wife (portrait made by Julius Ludwig Sebbers between 1826 and 1837)
