= Leitha Mountains =

Range of hills in Austria

- German: Leithagebirge
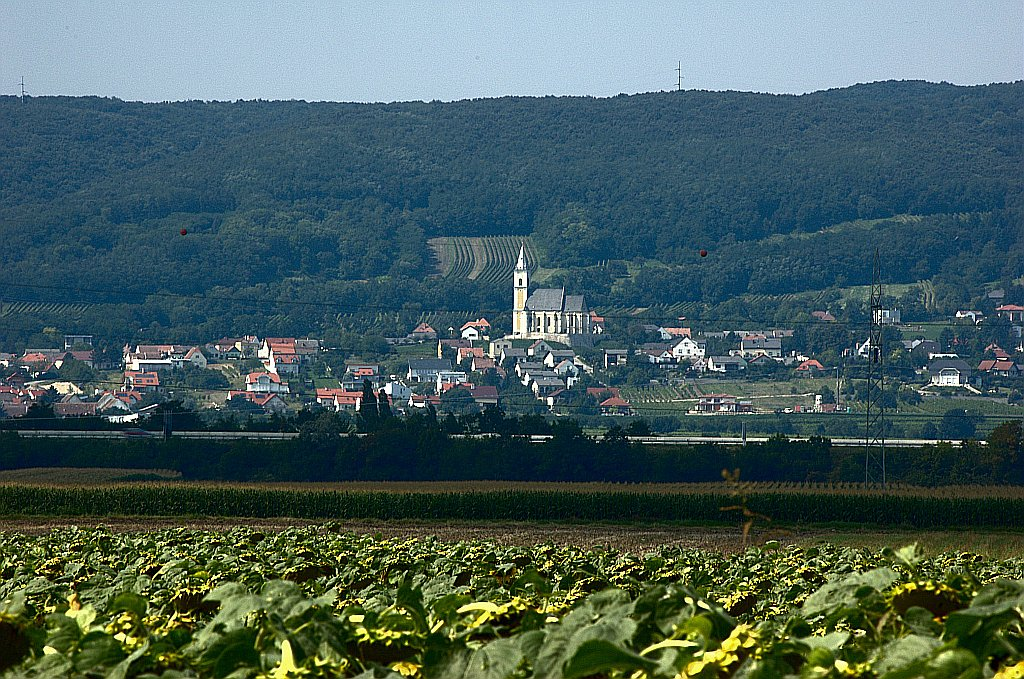
- The Leitha mountains near Kleinhöflein im Burgenland, Eisenstadt

Highest point
- Peak: Sonnenberg
- Elevation: 484 m (1,588 ft)
- Coordinates: 47°52′32″N 16°28′32″E

Geography
- Country: Austria
- States: Burgenland and Lower Austria
- Parent range: Alps

Geology
- Rock type: Sedimentary

The Leitha Mountains or, less frequently, Leitha Hills (German: Leithagebirge; Hungarian: Lajta-hegység), are a range of hills in Austria lying on the boundary between Lower Austria and Burgenland.

The range is an offshoot of the Alps and forms a connection to the Carpathians to the north. It is a ridge about 35 km long and 5–7 km wide along the southeastern edge of the Vienna Basin from Brucker Pforte in the northeast to Wiener Neustädter Pforte (Ödenburger Pforte) in the southwest. The range lies to the southeast of the Leitha River and is considered part of the Randgebirge östlich der Mur division of the Eastern Alps. Its highest peak, Sonnenberg (Hungarian: Nap-hegy), is 484 m above sea level.

The ridge is heavily forested with deciduous trees such as oak, hornbeam, and beech predominating.
