= Diocese of Eisenstadt =

Catholic diocese in Austria

Coordinates: 47.8452°N 16.5250°E

Diocese of Eisenstadt Dioecesis Sideropolitana Diözese Eisenstadt

Catholic
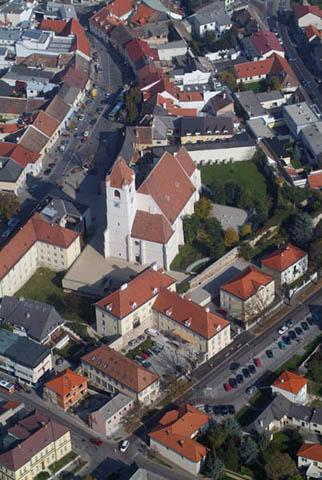
- Eisenstadt Cathedral

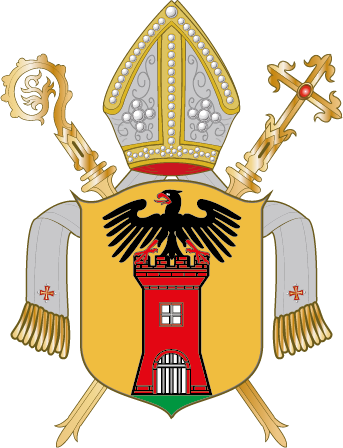
- Coat of arms

Location
- Country: Austria
- Territory: Burgenland
- Ecclesiastical province: Vienna
- Metropolitan: Archdiocese of Vienna

Statistics
- Area: 3,966 km^{2} (1,531 sq mi)
- Population: Total; Catholics: (as of 2019); 289,535; 191,164 (66%)

Information
- Denomination: Roman Catholic
- Rite: Roman Rite
- Established: August 15, 1960
- Cathedral: Cathedral of St Martin and St Rupert
- Patron saint: Saint Martin

Current leadership
- Pope: Leo XIV
- Bishop: Ägidius Zsifkovics
- Metropolitan Archbishop: Christoph Schönborn
- Bishops emeritus: Paul Iby

Map
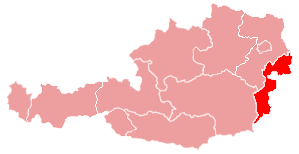

Website
- Website of the Diocese

The Diocese of Eisenstadt (Latin: Dioecesis Sideropolitana) is a Latin Church diocese of the Catholic Church located in the city of Eisenstadt in the ecclesiastical province of Vienna in Austria. The episcopal seat is in Eisenstadt Cathedral.

== History ==
- May 18, 1922: Established as Apostolic Administration of Burgenland from the Diocese of Győr, Hungary and Diocese of Szombathely, Hungary
- August 15, 1960: Promoted to Diocese of Eisenstadt

== Special churches ==
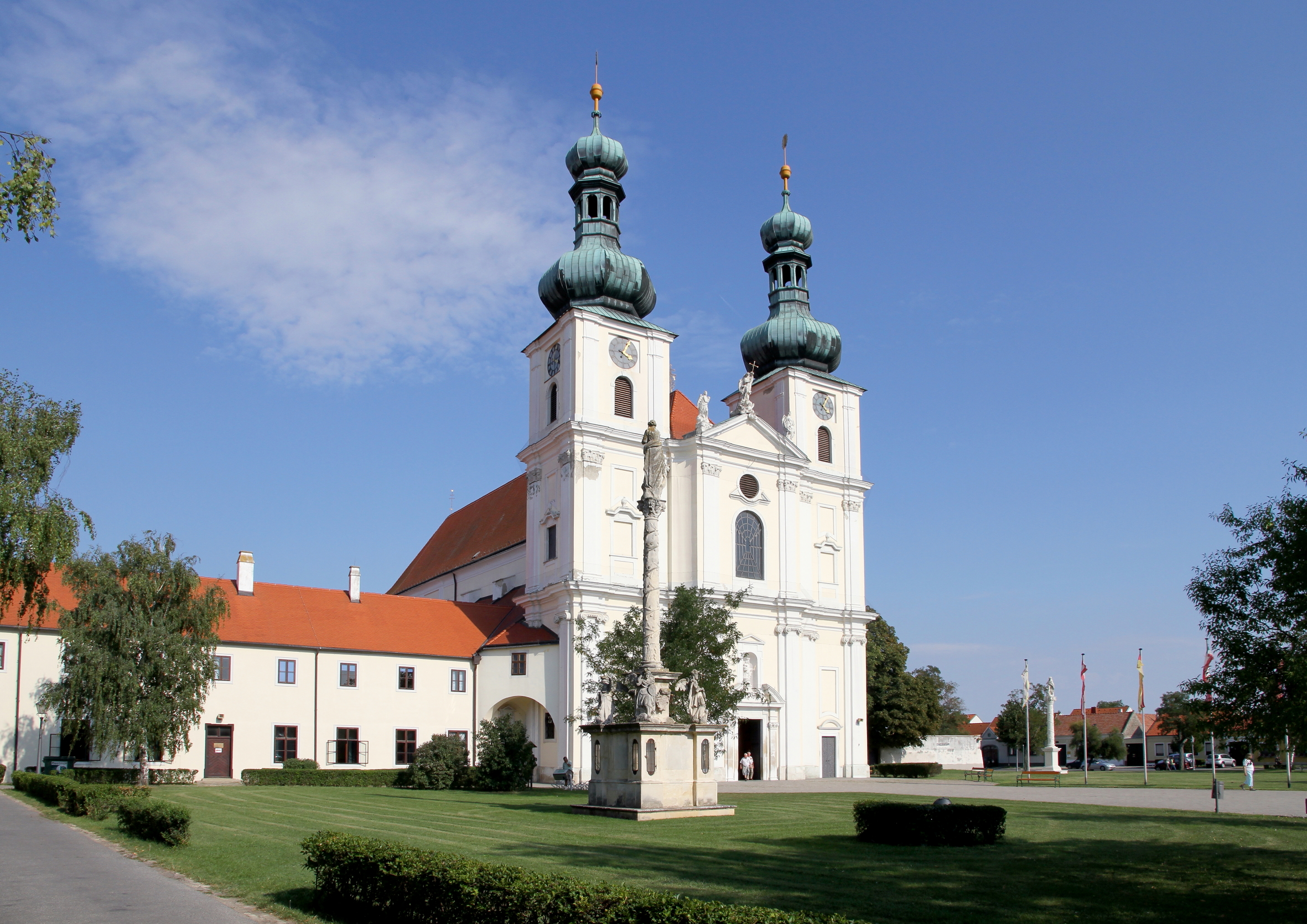
Church of the Ascension of the Blessed Virgin Mary (Mariä Himmelfahrt)

- Minor Basilicas:
  - Basilica of Maria Loretto, Loretto, Burgenland
  - Church of the Ascension of the Blessed Virgin Mary (Mariä Himmelfahrt), Frauenkirchen, Burgenland

== Leadership ==
- Bishops of Eisenstadt (Roman rite)
  - Bishop Ägidius Zsifkovics (proclaimed 2010.07.09)
  - Bishop Paul Iby (1992.12.28 – 2010.07.09)
  - Bishop Štefan László (1960.08.15 – 1992.12.28)
- Apostolic Administrators of Burgenland (Roman rite)
  - Bishop Štefan László (1954.01.30 – 1960.08.15)
  - Archbishop Josef Schoiswohl (1949.11.11 – 1954.01.18)
  - Cardinal Theodor Innitzer (1932 – 1949.11.11)
  - Cardinal Friedrich Gustav Piffl, C.R.S.A. (1922 – 1932.04.21)

== See also ==
- Roman Catholicism in Austria
- List of Roman Catholic dioceses in Austria
