= Paul Iby =

- Bishop Emeritus of Eisenstadt
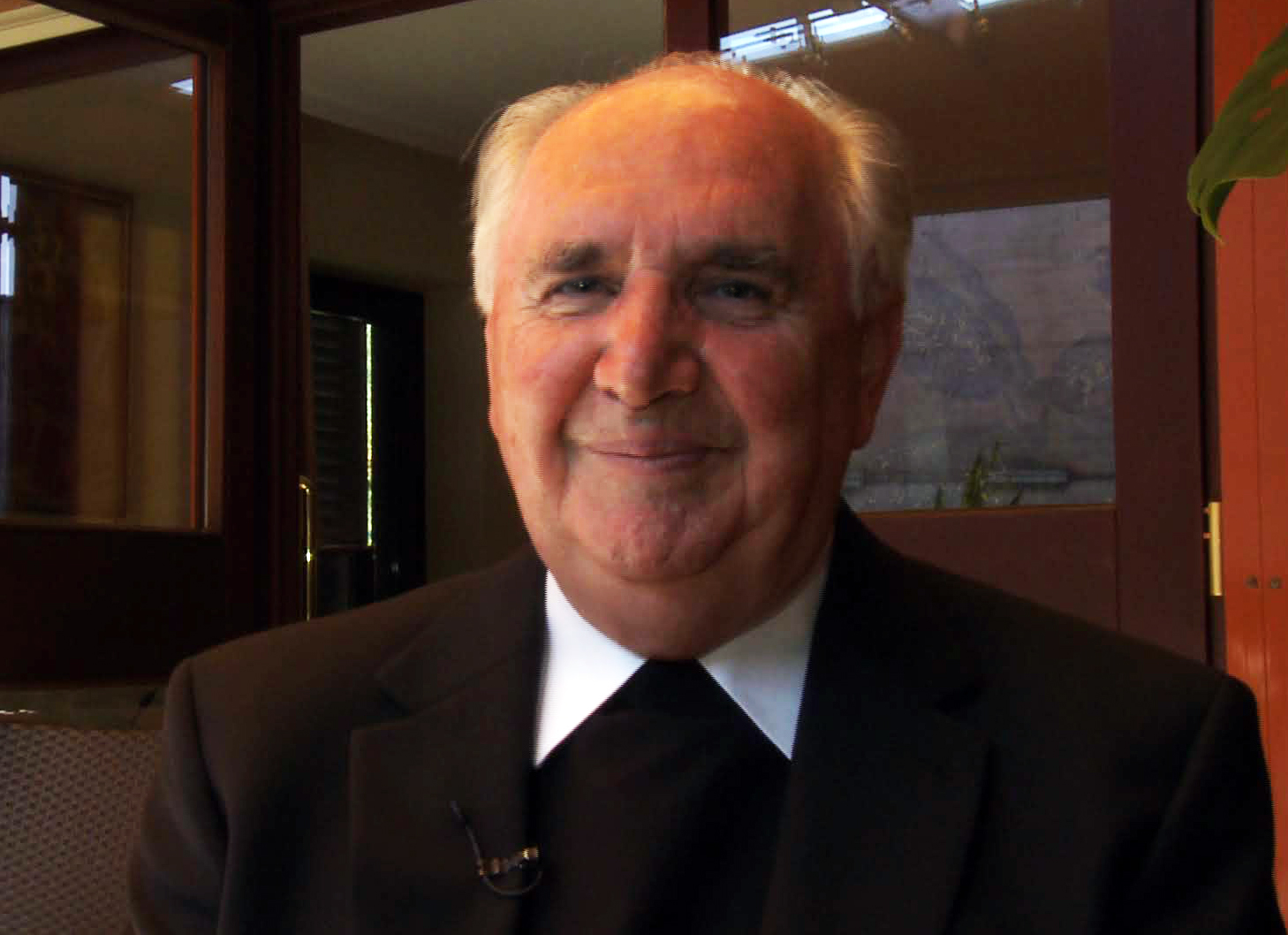
- Native name: Pál Iby
- Church: Catholic Church
- Diocese: Diocese of Eisenstadt
- In office: 28 December 1992 – 9 July 2010
- Predecessor: Stephan László
- Successor: Ägidius Zsifkovics

Orders
- Ordination: 29 June 1959
- Consecration: 24 January 1993 by Stephan László

Personal details
- Born: 23 January 1935 (age 91) Raiding, Federal State of Austria
- Coat of arms

Paul Iby (Hungarian: Iby Pál, born on 23 January 1935 in Doborján (German: Raiding)) is Bishop Emeritus of the Roman Catholic Diocese of Eisenstadt, Austria.

== Views ==
=== Clerical celibacy ===
Bishop Iby is convinced the Catholic church should drop its celibacy requirement for priests. It should be up to priests to decide whether they want to live a celibate life. "It should be at the discretion of every priest whether to live in voluntary celibacy or in a family," Die Presse quoted Iby as saying.

He would also welcome it if married men could be ordained.

=== Ordination of women ===
Bishop Iby also said that eventually the ordination of women should be considered.
