= Unterfrauenhaid =

- Municipality
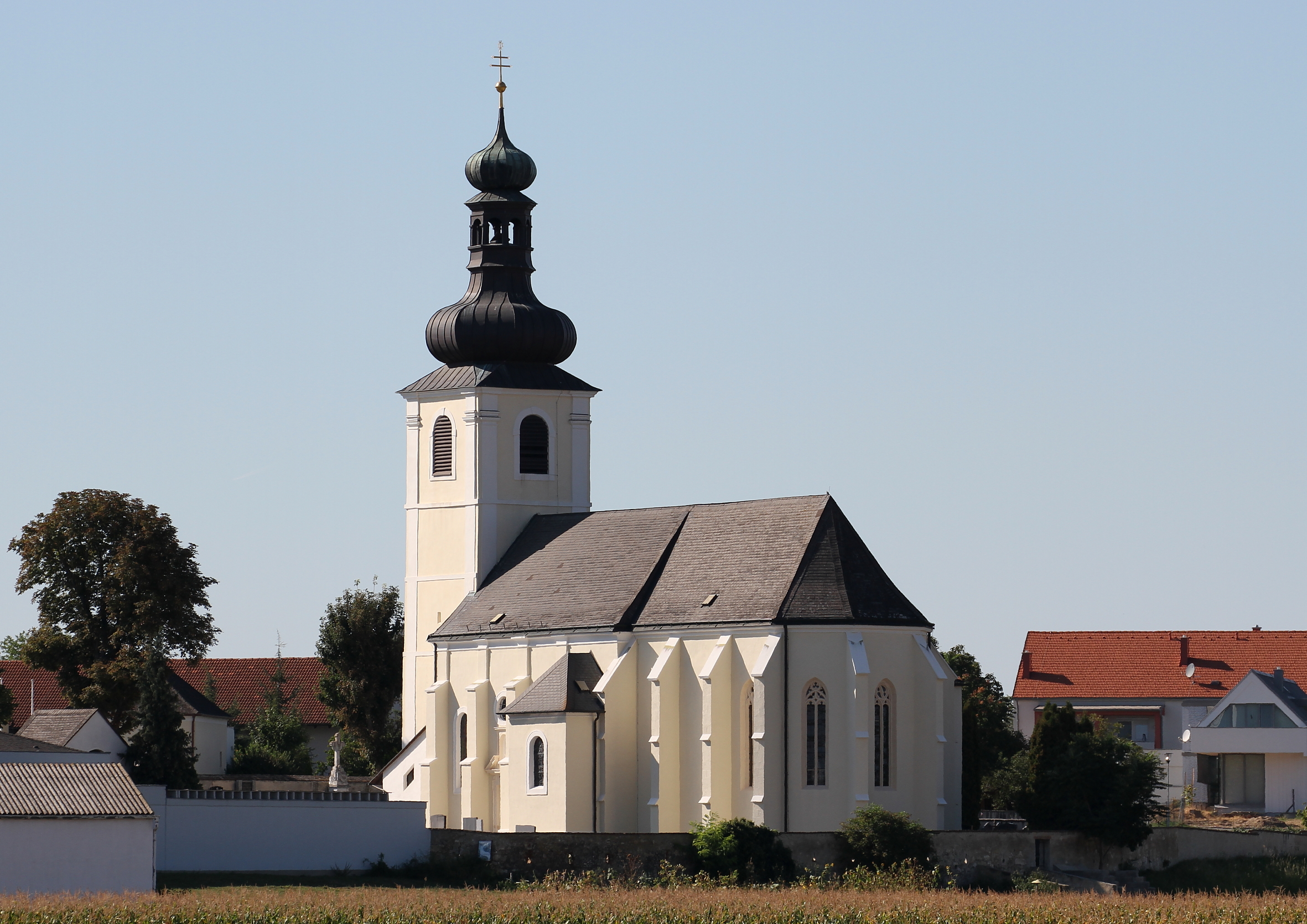
- Church of the Assumption of the Virgin Mary

- Coat of arms

- Location within Austria
- Coordinates: 47°34′N 16°30′E
- Country: Austria
- State: Burgenland
- District: Oberpullendorf

Government
  - Mayor: Friedrich Kreisits (SPÖ)

Area
  - Total: 10.97 km^{2} (4.24 sq mi)

Population (2018-01-01)
  - Total: 681
  - Density: 62.1/km^{2} (161/sq mi)
- Time zone: UTC+1 (CET)
  - Summer (DST): UTC+2 (CEST)
- Postal code: 7321

Unterfrauenhaid (Croatian: Svetica, Hungarian: Lók) is a town in the district of Oberpullendorf in the Austrian state of Burgenland.

== Population ==
Historical population
Year	Pop.	±%
1869	528	—
1880	556	+5.3%
1890	491	−11.7%
1900	565	+15.1%
1910	599	+6.0%
1923	686	+14.5%
1934	713	+3.9%
1939	667	−6.5%
1951	683	+2.4%
1961	681	−0.3%
1971	615	−9.7%
1981	685	+11.4%
1991	691	+0.9%
2001	759	+9.8%
2011	664	−12.5%
2023	652	−1.8%
