= 2025 Burgenland state election =

← 2020	19 January 2025	Next →

All 36 seats in the Landtag of Burgenland 19 seats needed for a majority
- Turnout: 197,145 (78.7%) ▲3.8%
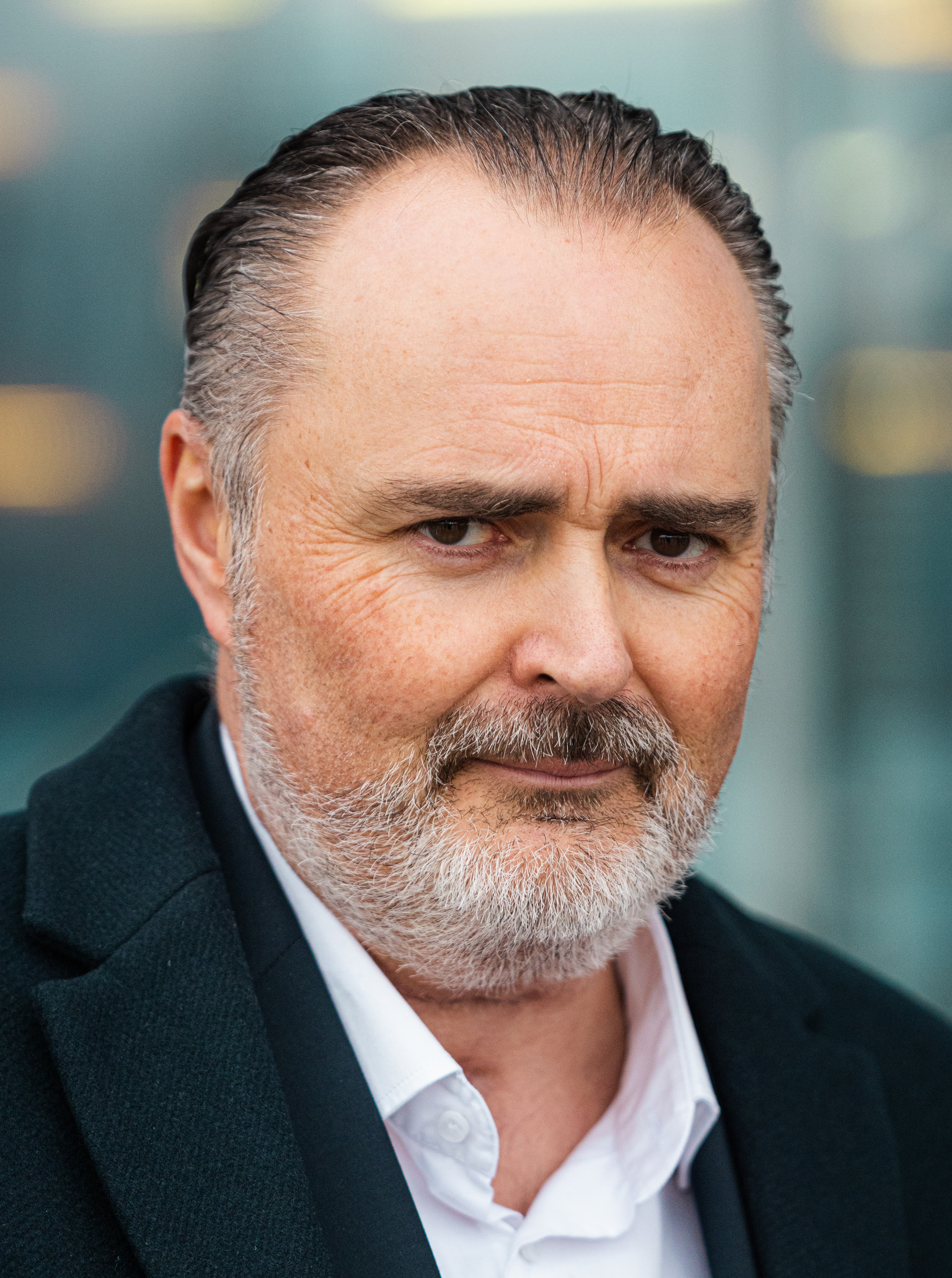

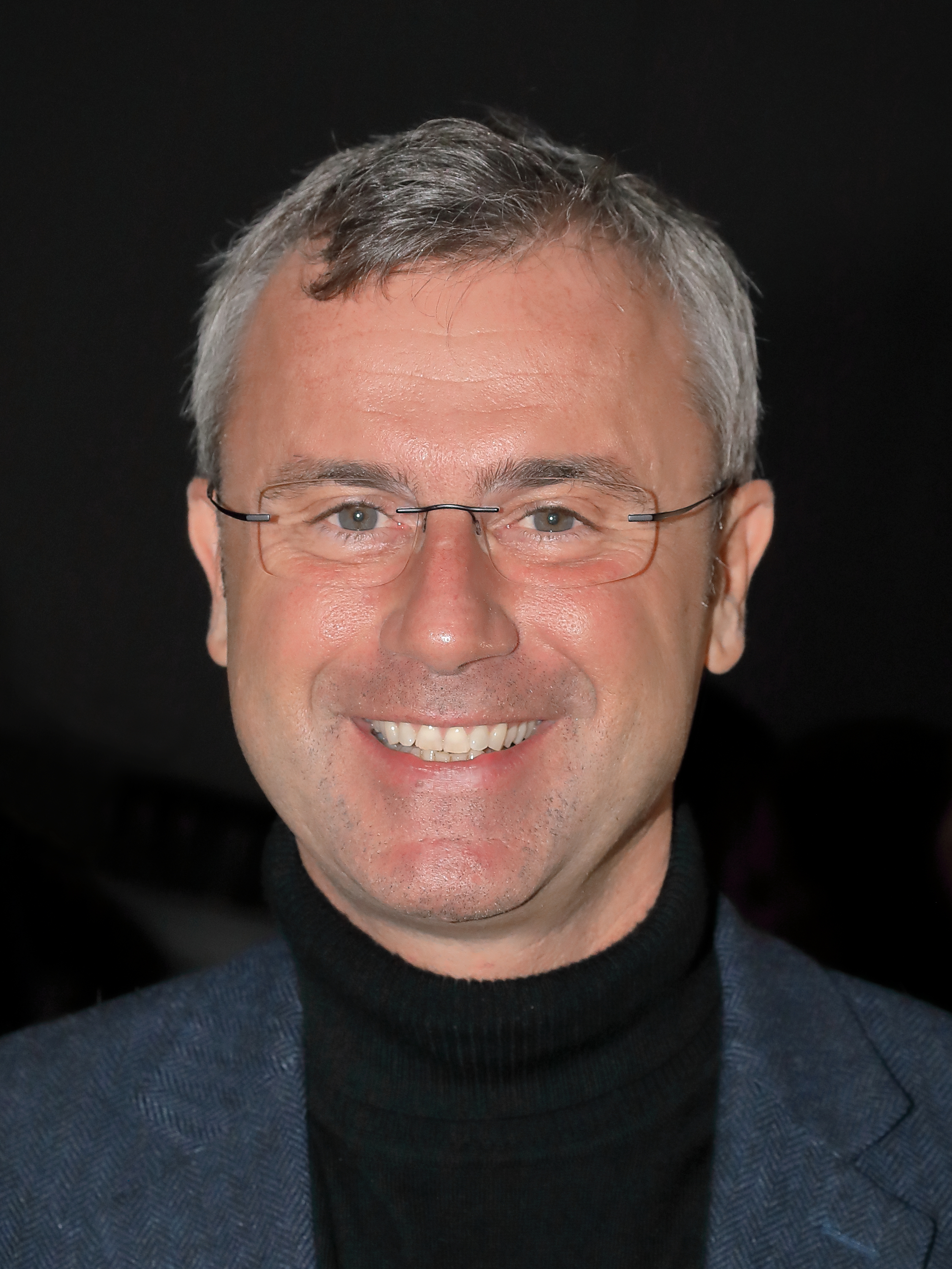

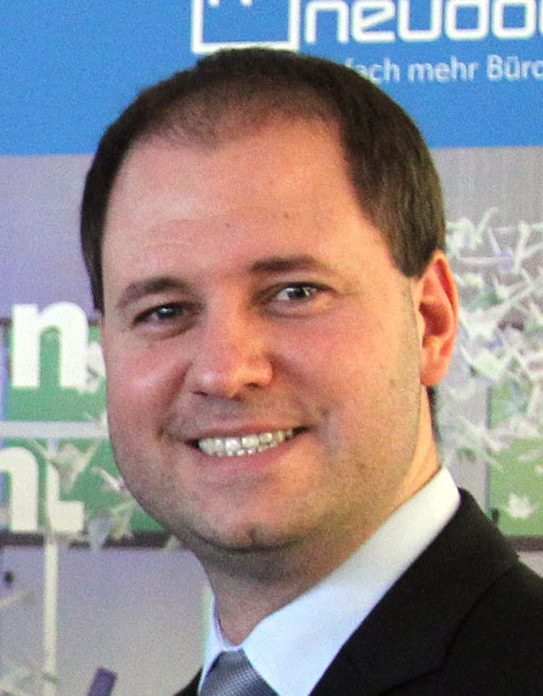

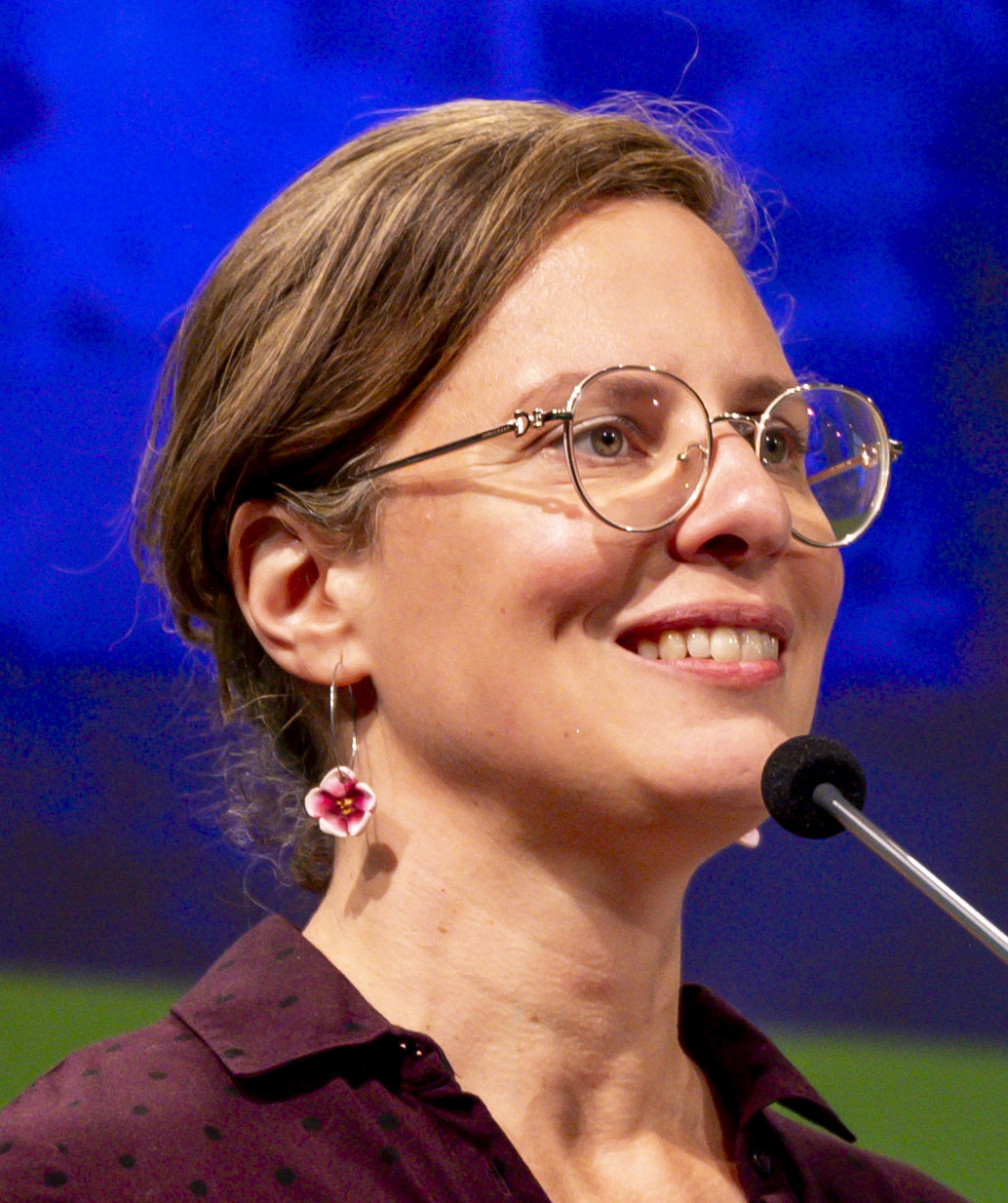
	First party	Second party
Leader	Hans Peter Doskozil	Norbert Hofer
Party	SPÖ	FPÖ
Last election	19 seats, 49.9%	4 seats, 9.8%
Seats won	17	9
Seat change	▼2	▲5
Popular vote	90,606	45,110
Percentage	46.4%	23.1%
Swing	▼3.6pp	▲13.3pp
	Third party	Fourth party
Leader	Christian Sagartz	Anja Haider-Wallner
Party	ÖVP	Greens
Last election	11 seats, 30.6%	2 seats, 6.7%
Seats won	8	2
Seat change	▼3	0
Popular vote	42,923	11,062
Percentage	22.0%	5.7%
Swing	▼8.6pp	▼1.1pp
Governor before election
Hans Peter Doskozil
SPÖ
Elected Governor
Hans Peter Doskozil
SPÖ

The 2025 Burgenland state election took place on 19 January 2025. The governing Social Democrats (SPÖ) lost their absolute majority and needed a coalition partner to govern. The People's Party (ÖVP) lost significantly and received its worst result ever in the state. Conversely, the Freedom Party (FPÖ) more than doubled its share and received its best result ever. The Green Party (GRÜNE) remained in the Landtag while slightly reducing its vote share. NEOS failed once again to enter the state parliament. Turnout was at almost 79% – an increase of four percent compared to the last election.

== Background ==
In the 2020 state election, the SPÖ gained 8.0 percentage points to 49.9% of the vote and, with 19 out of 36 mandates, achieved an absolute majority for the first time since the 2010 state election, when it lost it. With 30.6%, the ÖVP came in second place. Despite an increase of about 1.5 percentage points, the vote share corresponded to its second-worst state election in Burgenland since 1945. This was followed by the FPÖ and the Greens with 9.8% and 6.7% respectively, with the FPÖ suffering losses of 5.3 percentage points and the Greens recording a slight increase of 0.3 percentage points – the best result in Burgenland state elections since the Greens first run. The NEOS and the alliance Liste Burgenland did not manage to enter or re-enter the state parliament with 1.7% and 1.3% respectively due to the barrier clause. For state elections in Burgenland, a 4% electoral threshold applies.

After the election, an SPÖ sole government was formed under Governor Hans-Peter Doskozil. It was confirmed on 17 February 2020 with 35 out of 36 votes, i.e. with votes from all parties represented in the newly elected Burgenland state parliament including one invalid vote.

In May 2024, the FPÖ state party executive committee initially elected Alexander Petschnig as FPÖ top candidate. However, in October 2024 the FPÖ state party executive committee agreed on Norbert Hofer as FPÖ top candidate. For the Greens, state spokeswoman Anja Haider-Wallner was elected top candidate. The ÖVP top candidate is Christian Sagartz. In November 2024, NEOS elected state spokesman Christoph Schneider as the top candidate.

The former FPÖ politician Géza Molnár announced a candidacy with his own Liste Hausverstand ("Common Sense List").

== Electoral system ==
The 36 seats of the Landtag of Burgenland are elected via open list proportional representation in a two-step process. The seats are distributed between seven multi-member constituencies, corresponding to the seven districts of Burgenland (the statutory cities of Eisenstadt and Rust are combined with Eisenstadt-Umgebung District). Apportionment of the seats is based on the results of the most recent census.

For parties to receive any representation in the Landtag, they must either win at least one seat in a constituency directly, or clear a 4 percent state-wide electoral threshold. Seats are distributed in constituencies according to the Hare quota, with any remaining seats allocated using the D'Hondt method at the state level, to ensure overall proportionality between a party's vote share and its share of seats.

In addition to voting for a political party, voters may cast preferential votes for specific candidates of that party, but are not required to do so. These additional votes do not affect the proportional allocation based on the vote for the party or list, but can change the rank order of candidates on a party's lists at the state and constituency level. Voters may cast one preferential vote at the state level, or three at the constituency level. A voter may not cross party-lines to cast a preference vote for a candidate of another party; such preference votes are invalid.

== Contesting parties ==
Name		Ideology	Leader	2020 result	
Name		Ideology	Leader	Votes (%)	Seats
SPÖ	Social Democratic Party of Austria; Sozialdemokratische Partei Österreichs	Social democracy	Hans Peter Doskozil	49.9%	19 / 36
ÖVP	Austrian People's Party; Österreichische Volkspartei	Christian democracy Liberal conservatism	Christian Sagartz	30.6%	11 / 36
FPÖ	Freedom Party of Austria; Freiheitliche Partei Österreichs	National conservatism Right-wing populism Euroscepticism	Norbert Hofer	9.8%	4 / 36
GRÜNE	The Greens – The Green Alternative; Die Grünen – Die Grüne Alternative	Green politics Progressivism	Anja Haider-Wallner	6.7%	2 / 36
NEOS	NEOS – The New Austria and Liberal Forum; NEOS – Das Neue Österreich und Liberales Forum	Liberalism; Pro-Europeanism	Christoph Schneider	2.3%	0 / 36

In addition to the parties already represented in the Landtag, one party collected enough signatures to be placed on the ballot:

- Liste Hausverstand (Common Sense List)

== Opinion polls ==
Polling firm	Fieldwork date	Sample size	SPÖ	ÖVP	FPÖ	Grüne	NEOS	MFG	Others	Lead
2025 state election	19 Jan 2025	–	46.4	22.0	23.1	5.7	2.1	–	0.8 (Note: Liste Hausverstand at 0.8%)	23.3
IFDD/BVZ	13 Nov–6 Dec 2024	800	47	21	25	4	2	–	1	22
Peter Hajek/SPÖ Burgenland	1–21 Apr 2022	600	54	23	10	6	3	4	–	32
Peter Hajek/SPÖ Burgenland	26 Nov–7 Dec 2020	503	53	23	9	8	3	4	–	11
Peter Hajek/SPÖ Burgenland	3–14 Sep 2020	600	51	25	14	7	2	1	–	8–12
Peter Hajek/SPÖ Burgenland	March 2020	–	51	29	9	8	–	3	–	17
2020 state election	26 Jan 2020	–	49.9	30.6	9.8	6.7	1.7	–	1.3 (Note: LBL at 1.3%)	19.3

== Results ==
Party	Votes	%	+/−	Seats	+/−
Social Democratic Party of Austria (SPÖ)	90,606	46.38	–3.55	17	–2
Freedom Party of Austria (FPÖ)	45,110	23.09	+13.30	9	+5
Austrian People's Party (ÖVP)	42,923	21.97	–8.61	8	–3
The Greens – The Green Alternative (GRÜNE)	11,062	5.66	–1.06	2	±0
NEOS – The New Austria (NEOS)	4,018	2.06	+0.34	0	±0
Liste Hausverstand (incl. LBL)	1,622	0.83	–0.43	0	New
Invalid/blank votes	1,804	–	–	–	–
Total	197,145	100	–	36	0
Registered voters/turnout	250,400	78.73	+3.79	–	–
Source: Burgenland Government

Popular vote
SPÖ	46.38%
FPÖ	23.09%
ÖVP	21.97%
GRÜNE	5.66%
NEOS	2.06%
HAUS	0.83%

Landtag seats
SPÖ	47.22%
FPÖ	25.00%
ÖVP	22.22%
GRÜNE	5.56%

Results by constituency

Constituency	SPÖ		FPÖ		ÖVP		Grüne		NEOS		Total seats	Turnout
Constituency	%	S	%	S	%	S	%	S	%	S	Total seats	Turnout
Eisenstadt	36.3		19.6		26.4		12.2		3.6			76.2
Eisenstadt-Umgebung	49.8		20.4		20.2		6.1		2.6			79.5
Güssing	44.2		23.3		26.4		4.2		1.4			80.9
Jennersdorf	46.8		28.2		18.4		4.5		1.4			76.3
Mattersburg	47.7		23.5		19.7		6.0		2.3			78.5
Neusiedl am See	45.5		23.2		22.3		5.9		2.3			77.0
Oberpullendorf	47.0		20.5		24.5		5.4		1.7			79.8
Oberwart	46.7		25.7		20.7		4.7		1.6			79.7
Rust	44.9		26.8		16.9		6.6		3.4			79.1
Remaining seats												
Total	46.4	17	23.1	9	22.0	8	5.7	2	2.1	0	36	78.7
Source: orf.at Burgenland Government

== Aftermath ==
After losing the absolute majority in the Landtag, Governor Doskozil (SPÖ) did not initially state a preference for a future coalition partner, but said he and his team will first talk with the other three parties (FPÖ, ÖVP and GRÜNE). He announced he will then choose the party as partner with the most overlapping support on the various issues facing the state of Burgenland. On 27 January, Doskozil declared that the SPÖ and GRÜNE would negotiate a governing coalition. The new SPÖ-GRÜNE government was sworn into office on 6 February.
