= 2010 Burgenland state election =

← 2005	30 May 2010	2015 →

All 36 seats in the Landtag of Burgenland 19 seats needed for a majority All 7 seats in the state government
- Turnout: 192,246 (77.3%) ▼4.1%
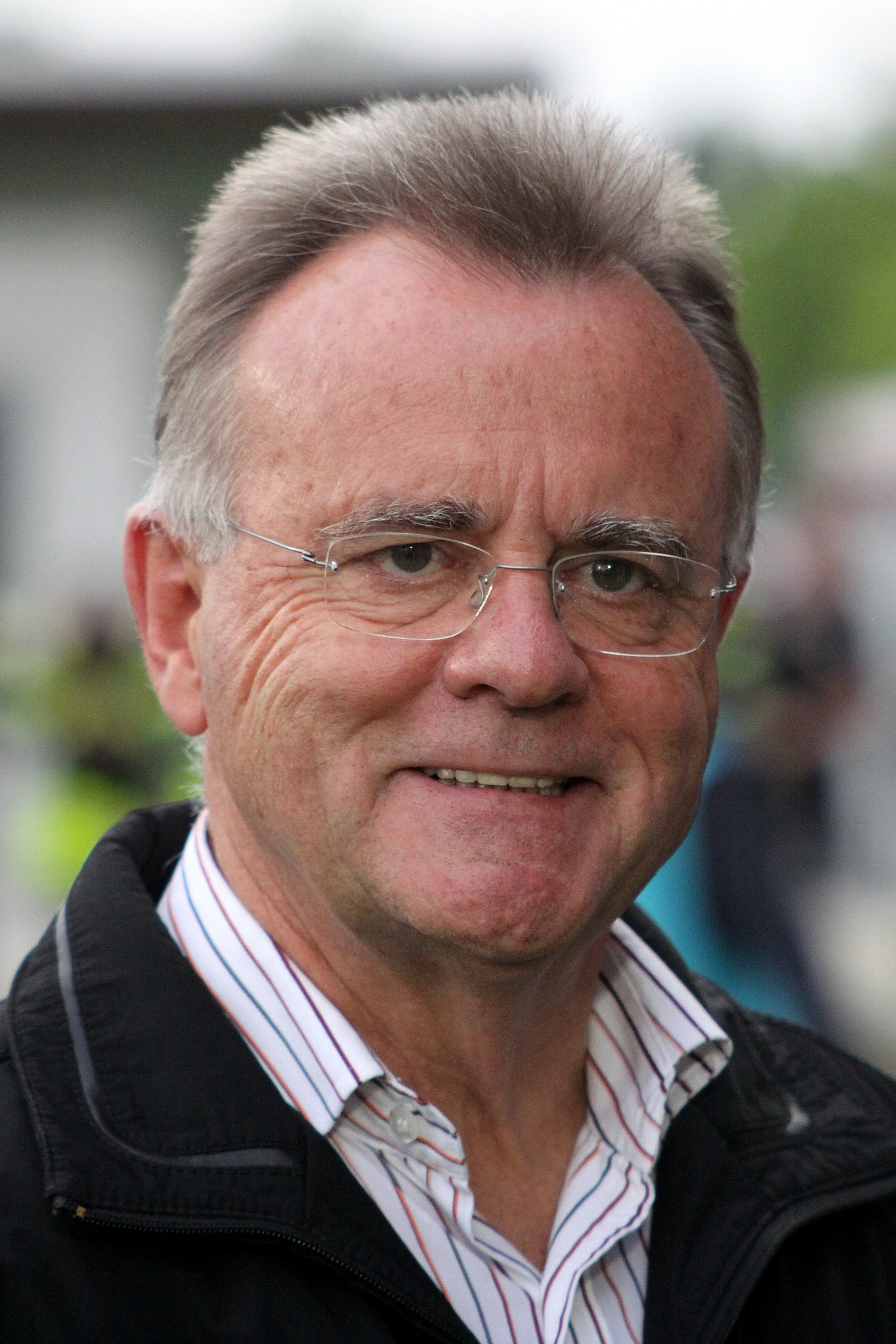

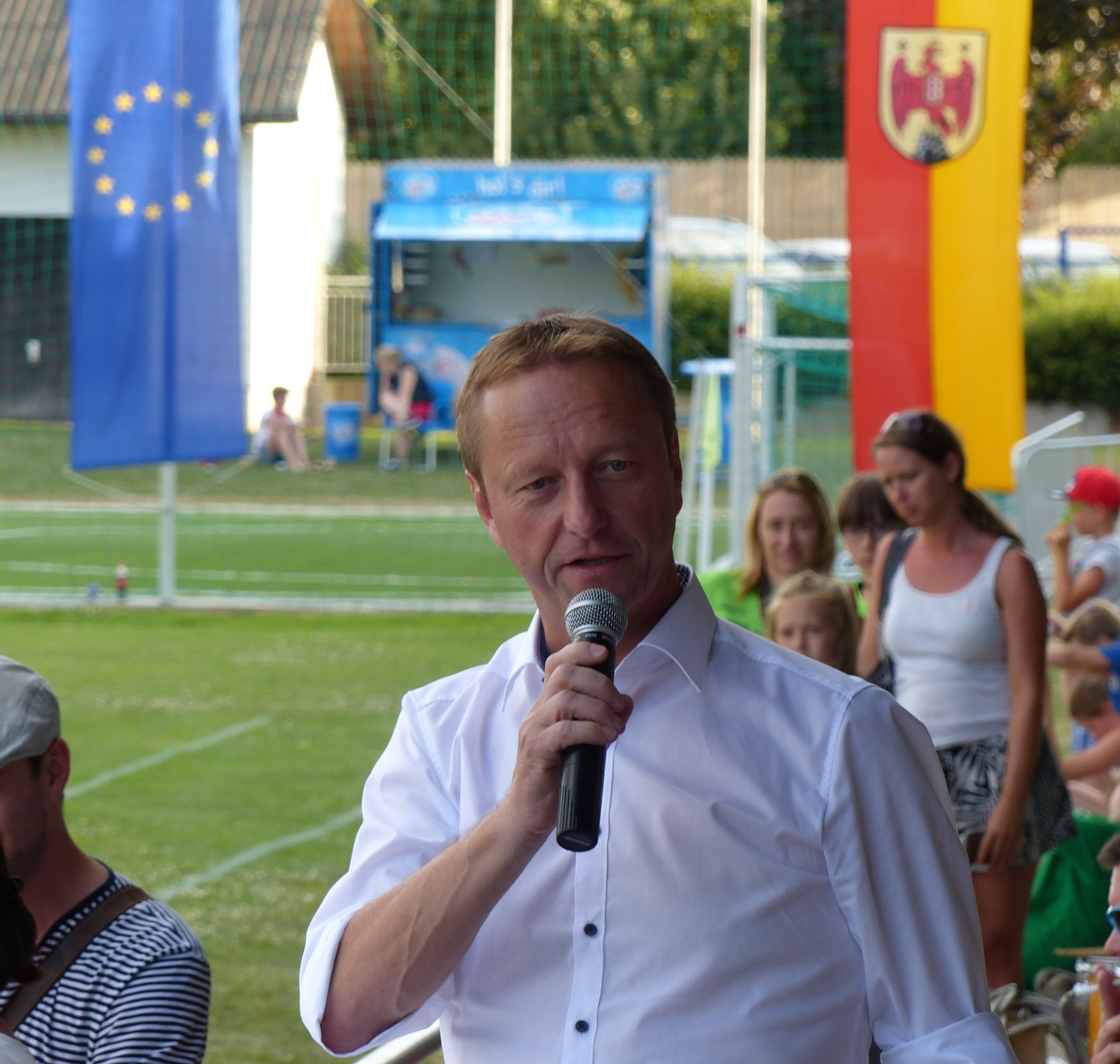

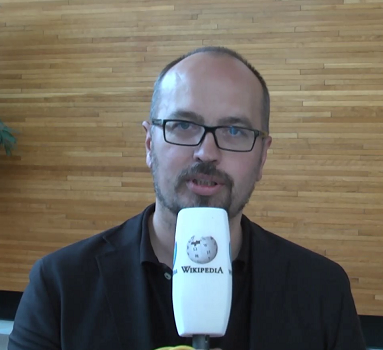
	First party	Second party	Third party
Leader	Hans Niessl	Franz Steindl	Johann Tschürtz
Party	SPÖ	ÖVP	FPÖ
Last election	19 seats, 52.2%	13 seats, 36.4%	2 seats, 5.8%
Seats won	18	13	3
Seat change	▼1	0	▲1
Popular vote	91,185	65,411	16,970
Percentage	48.3%	34.6%	9.0%
Swing	▼3.9%	▼1.8%	▲3.2%
	Fourth party	Fifth party
Leader	Michel Reimon	Manfred Kölly
Party	Greens	LBL
Last election	2 seats, 5.2%	Did not exist
Seats won	1	1
Seat change	▼1	▲1
Popular vote	7,835	7,559
Percentage	4.1%	4.0%
Swing	▼1.1%	New party
Governor before election
Hans Niessl
SPÖ
Elected Governor
Hans Niessl
SPÖ

The 2010 Burgenland state election was held on 30 May 2010 to elect the members of the 20th Landtag of Burgenland.

The governing Social Democratic Party of Austria (SPÖ) narrowly lost its majority, while the Freedom Party of Austria (FPÖ) and List Burgenland (LBL) made gains. Governor Hans Niessl was returned for a third term.

== Background ==
Prior to amendments made in 2014, the Burgenland constitution mandated that cabinet positions in the state government (state councillors, German: Landesräten) be allocated between parties proportionally in accordance with the share of votes won by each; this is known as Proporz. As such, the government was a perpetual coalition of all parties that qualified for at least one state councillor.

In the 2005 election, the SPÖ won an absolute majority with 52.2% of votes.

== Electoral system ==
The 36 seats of the Landtag of Burgenland are elected via open list proportional representation in a two-step process. The seats are distributed between seven multi-member constituencies, corresponding to the seven districts of Burgenland (the statutory cities of Eisenstadt and Rust are combined with Eisenstadt-Umgebung District). Apportionment of the seats is based on the results of the most recent census.

For parties to receive any representation in the Landtag, they must either win at least one seat in a constituency directly, or clear a 4 percent state-wide electoral threshold. Seats are distributed in constituencies according to the Hare quota, with any remaining seats allocated using the D'Hondt method at the state level, to ensure overall proportionality between a party's vote share and its share of seats.

In addition to voting for a political party, voters may cast preferential votes for specific candidates of that party, but are not required to do so. These additional votes do not affect the proportional allocation based on the vote for the party or list, but can change the rank order of candidates on a party's lists at the state and constituency level. Voters may cast one preferential vote at the state level, or three at the constituency level. A voter may not cross party-lines to cast a preference vote for a candidate of another party; such preference votes are invalid.

== Contesting parties ==
Name		Ideology	Leader	2005 result		
Name		Ideology	Leader	Votes (%)	Seats	Councillors
SPÖ	Social Democratic Party of Austria; Sozialdemokratische Partei Österreichs	Social democracy	Hans Niessl	52.2%	19 / 36	4 / 7
ÖVP	Austrian People's Party; Österreichische Volkspartei	Christian democracy	Franz Steindl	36.4%	13 / 36	3 / 7
GRÜNE	The Greens – The Green Alternative; Die Grünen – Die Grüne Alternative	Green politics	Regina Petrik	5.2%	2 / 36	
FPÖ	Freedom Party of Austria; Freiheitliche Partei Österreichs	Right-wing populism Euroscepticism	Johann Tschürtz	5.8%	2 / 36	

In addition to the parties already represented in the Landtag, one party collected enough signatures to be placed on the ballot.

- List Burgenland (LBL)

== Results ==
Party	Votes	%	+/−	Seats	+/−	Coun.	+/−
Social Democratic Party of Austria (SPÖ)	91,185	48.26	–3.92	18	–1	4	±0
Austrian People's Party (ÖVP)	65,411	34.62	–1.76	13	±0	3	±0
Freedom Party of Austria (FPÖ)	16,970	8.98	+3.23	3	+1	0	±0
The Greens – The Green Alternative (GRÜNE)	7,835	4.15	–1.06	1	–1	0	±0
List Burgenland (LBL)	7,559	4.00	New	1	New	0	New
Invalid/blank votes	3,286	–	–	–	–	–	–
Total	192,246	100	–	36	0	7	0
Registered voters/turnout	248,694	77.30	–4.08	–	–	–	–
Source: Burgenland Government

Popular vote
SPÖ	48.26%
ÖVP	34.62%
FPÖ	8.98%
GRÜNE	4.15%
LBL	4.00%

Landtag seats
SPÖ	50.00%
ÖVP	36.11%
FPÖ	8.33%
GRÜNE	2.78%
LBL	2.78%

=== Results by constituency ===
Constituency	SPÖ		ÖVP		FPÖ		Grüne		LBL		Total seats	Turnout
Constituency	%	S	%	S	%	S	%	S	%	S	Total seats	Turnout
Neusiedl	52.2	3	32.5	2	9.0		3.8		2.5		5	75.0
Eisenstadt	46.1	3	34.6	2	8.5		5.9		4.8		5	76.5
Mattersburg	50.7	2	28.4	1	10.7		4.2		6.1		3	77.1
Oberpullendorf	48.5	2	35.3	1	5.7		3.3		7.3		3	80.9
Oberwart	48.5	3	34.0	2	11.4		3.7		2.3		5	77.2
Güssing	44.5	1	43.7	1	7.1		3.0		1.6		2	80.0
Jennersdorf	41.9		39.6		10.8		5.1		2.6		0	74.6
Remaining seats		4		4		3		1		1	13	
Total	48.3	18	34.6	13	9.0	3	4.1	1	4.0	1	36	77.3
Source: Burgenland Government
