= Johann Tschürtz =

Austrian politician (born 1967)

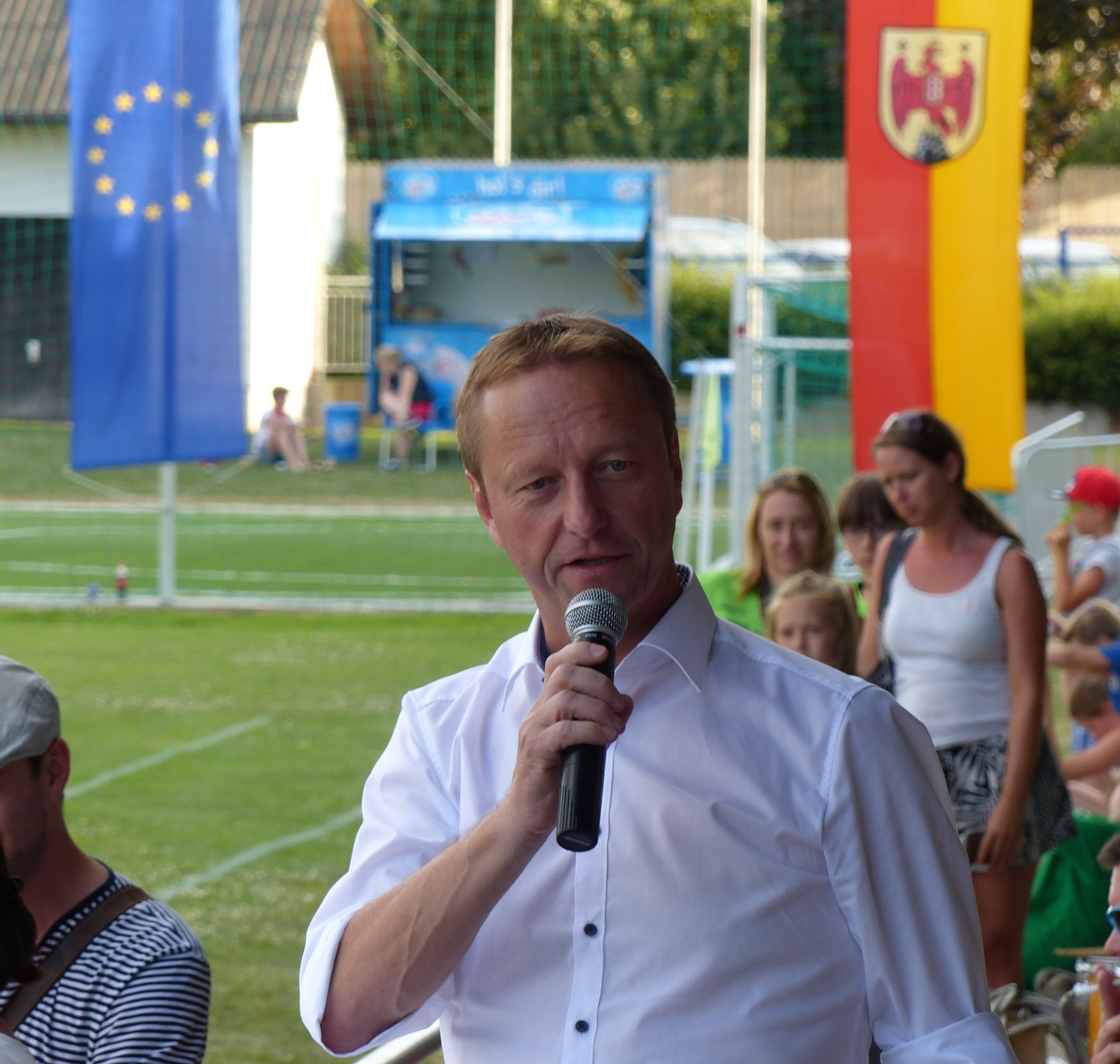
- Tschürtz in 2016

Deputy Governor of Burgenland
- In office 9 July 2015 – 7 February 2020
- Succeeded by: Astrid Eisenkopf

Leader of the Freedom Party of Austria in Burgenland
- In office 16 January 2005 – 28 January 2020
- Succeeded by: Alexander Petschnig

Member of the Landtag of Burgenland
- Incumbent
- Assumed office 26 January 2020
- In office 6 November 1997 – 9 July 2015

Personal details
- Born: Johann Tschürtz; 12 December 1959 (age 66)
- Party: Freedom Party of Austria

Johann "Hans" Tschürtz (born 27 January 1967) is an Austrian politician of the Freedom Party of Austria (FPÖ). He served as deputy governor of the state of Burgenland from 2015 to 2020, and leader of the FPÖ in Burgenland from 2005 to 2020.

== Personal life ==
Tschürtz first attended elementary and secondary school and completed an apprenticeship as a locksmith at the police school in Vienna. From 1981, Tschürtz worked there as an executive officer. During his time in the military, Tschürtz was also stationed in the Golan Heights as part of a United Nations mission.

== Political career ==
Tschürtz has been an active member of the FPÖ since the 1990s; he founded a local party branch in his home town of Loipersbach in 1992. The same year, he was elected district party chairman for the Mattersburg District. He became regional manager of FPÖ Burgeland in July 1996, and became a member of the state Landtag in November 1997. He was not elected in the 2000 state election, but nonetheless returned after Wolfgang Rauter did not take his seat.

Tschürtz was elected deputy chairman of the FPÖ Burgenland in May 2002, and took on the role of executive chairman after Stefan Salzl withdrew from the party leadership. On 16 January 2005, he was elected FPÖ regional chairman with 91.9% of votes at a state party conference in Eisenstadt, and went into the 2005 state election as the lead candidate. The FPÖ suffered a substantial defeat, losing half its voteshare and winning only two seats. Tschürtz became chairman of the parliamentary group.

In August 2006, Tschürtz was re-elected party chairman with 84% of votes. After a series of internal disputes, former leader Wolfgang Rauter left the party and joined expelled member Manfred Kölly to form the List Burgenland, which drew support from the FPÖ.

In the 2015 state election, Tschürtz once again ran as lead candidate. The party won 15.0% and six seats, its best ever result in Burgenland. After negotiations, the FPÖ entered into a coalition with the FPÖ, and Tschürtz was elected Deputy Governor on 9 July 2015. He resigned from the Landtag to join cabinet, and was succeeded by Gerhard Kovasits as group chairman.

The coalition was terminated by the SPÖ after the Ibiza affair, and the FPÖ suffered losses in the subsequent 2020 election. The SPÖ won an absolute majority, and the FPÖ was excluded from government. Tschürtz resigned as party leader shortly afterwards, and was succeeded by Alexander Petschnig, but remained a member of the Landtag.
