= Thomas Steiner (politician) =

Austrian politician (born 1967)

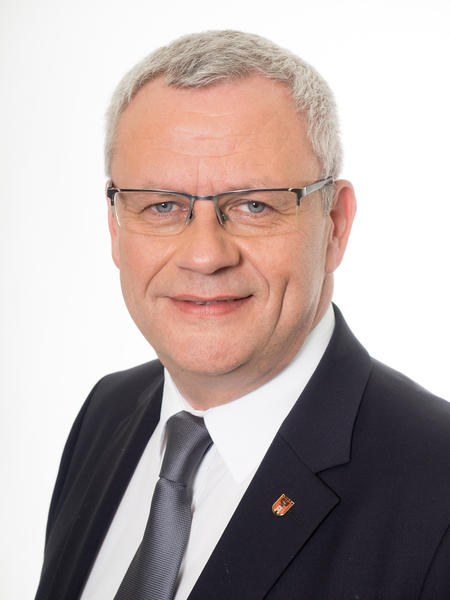
- Steiner in 2017

Mayor of Eisenstadt
- Incumbent
- Assumed office November 2011
- Preceded by: Andrea Fraunschiel

Leader of the Austrian People's Party in Burgenland
- In office 4 June 2015 – 21 February 2020
- Preceded by: Franz Steindl
- Succeeded by: Christian Sagartz

Member of the Landtag of Burgenland
- Incumbent
- Assumed office 30 May 2010

Personal details
- Born: Thomas Steiner; 27 January 1967 (age 59)
- Party: Austrian People's Party
- Children: 1

Thomas Steiner (born 27 January 1967) is an Austrian politician of the Austrian People's Party (ÖVP). He has served as Mayor of Eisenstadt, the capital of the state of Burgenland, since 2011. He was chairman of the state ÖVP branch from 2015 to 2020, and was the party's lead candidate in the 2020 state election.

== Personal life ==
Steiner is the son of primary school director Matthias Steiner and his wife Magdalena (née Karner). He grew up with five siblings in Podersdorf and Loretto, where he attended elementary school, before moving to Eisenstadt. He attended the Bundesrealgymnasium there and passed his Matura in 1985. Steiner then studied at the Law Faculty of the University of Vienna (Juridicum Vienna) and graduated in 1991. After completing his studies, he did his military service in the Austrian Armed Forces.

After successfully completing his law studies, Steiner entered the service of the Burgenland state government as a contract employee in 1991.

Steiner lives in Eisenstadt. he has been married to Andrea Steiner since 1992 and has one son.

On 7 April 2017, Steiner was an eyewitness to the 2017 Stockholm truck attack, in which five people were killed and 15 injured.

== Political career ==
Steiner began his political career in 1990 as chairman of the Young People's Party. Between 1991 and 1996 he was secretary of the ÖVP group in the state Landtag, and from 1996 to 2000 he worked in the office of the provincial governor's deputy. From 2000 to 2010, Steiner headed the office of Deputy Governor Franz Steindl.

Steiner was elected to the local council of Eisenstadt in 2007, and in the same year he became deputy district chairman of the Eisenstadt branch of the Austrian Workers' and Employees Union, the ÖVP's affiliated workers association. In 2008, he became local ÖVP chairman and party group chairman in the city council. Steiner was elected to the Landtag of Burgenland in the 2010 state election. He served as spokesman for administration and constitution, then from 2015 for transport and infrastructure.

In November 2011, Steiner succeeded Andrea Fraunschiel as mayor of Eisenstadt. In the local and mayoral elections on 1 October 2017, Steiner was re-elected with 60.3% of votes.

=== State ÖVP leadership ===
On 4 June 2015, Steiner was appointed state party chairman of the ÖVP Burgenland, and was officially elected at a party conference in November, winning 97.6% of votes. He replaced Franz Steindl.

The Proporz system was abolished in Burgenland in 2014, and after the 2015 election the ÖVP was relegated to opposition for the first time since 1945. Under Steiner's leadership, in 2018 the party joined the new course spearheaded by federal leader Sebastian Kurz, branding itself the "New People's Party" (German: Neue Volkspartei) and changing its colour to turquoise.

Steiner was the ÖVP's lead candidate in the 2020 Burgenland state election. The party recorded a small swing in its favour, but did not recover the losses it had suffered in 2015; to the contrary, the SPÖ won an absolute majority, while the ÖVP failed to gain any seats. Steiner resigned as leader after the election, and was succeeded by Christian Sagartz.
