= Christian Drobits =

Austrian politician (born 1968)

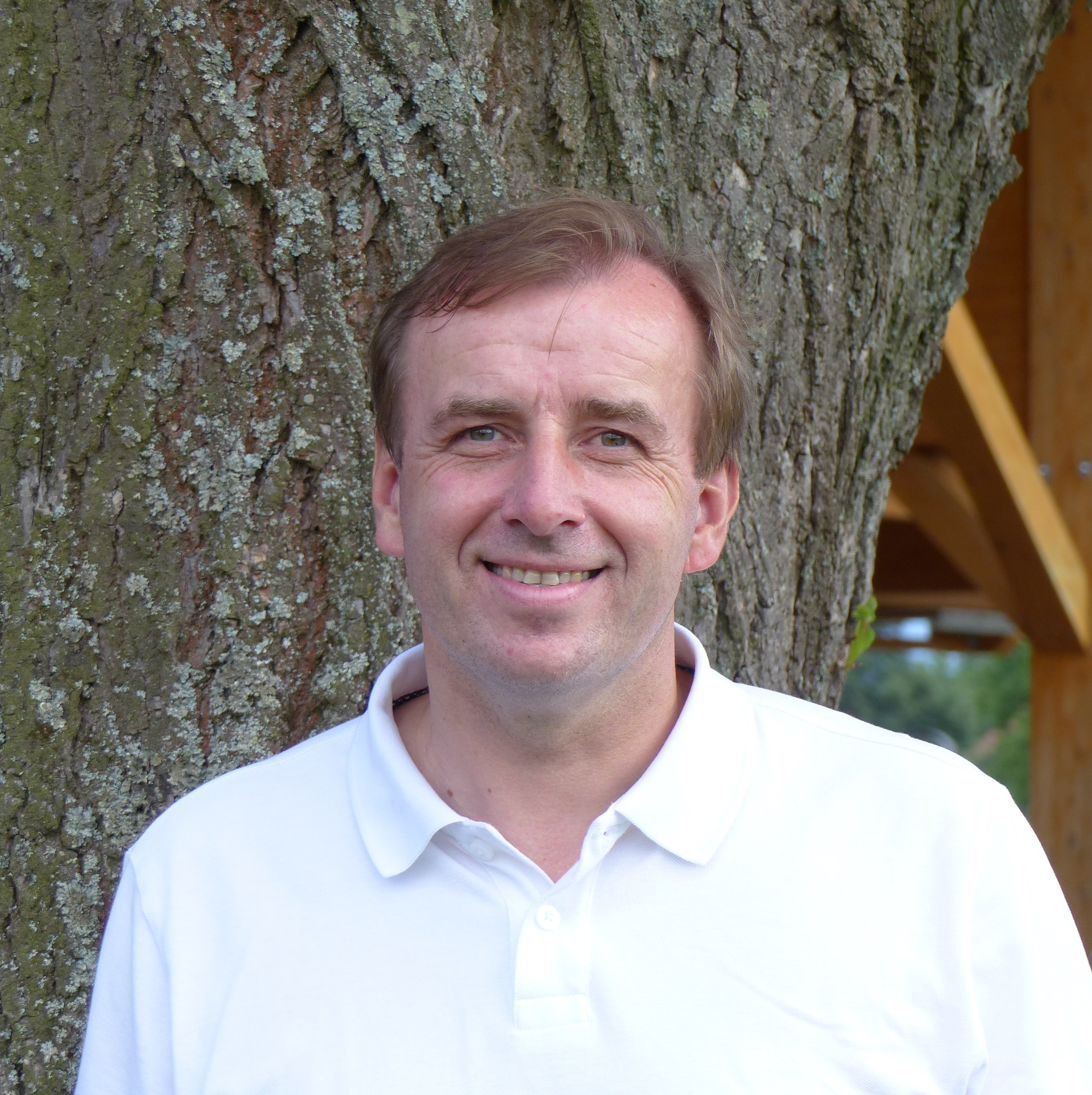
- Drobits in July 2017

Member of the National Council
- Incumbent
- Assumed office 23 October 2019
- Constituency: Burgenland

Member of the Landtag Burgenland
- In office 9 July 2015 – 14 October 2019
- Succeeded by: Doris Prohaska
- Constituency: Oberwart

Personal details
- Born: 7 February 1968 (age 58) Oberwart, Austria
- Party: Social Democratic Party
- Education: University of Vienna

Christian Drobits (born 7 February 1968) is an Austrian politician and member of the National Council. A member of the Social Democratic Party, he has represented Burgenland since October 2019. He was a member of the Landtag Burgenland from July 2015 to October 2019.

Drobits was born on 7 February 1968 in Oberwart. He has a degree in law from the University of Vienna. He has been a lawyer for the Chamber of Labour (Arbeiterkammer) in Burgenland since 2003. He has held various positions in the Burgenland branch of the Social Democratic Party (SPÖ) since 2015. He has been a member of the municipal council in Rotenturm an der Pinka since 2000. He was elected to the Landtag Burgenland at the 2015 state election. He was elected to the National Council at the 2019 legislative election. He subsequently resigned from the Landtag in October 2019 and was replaced by Doris Prohaska in Oberwart electoral district.

Electoral history of Christian Drobits
| Election | Electoral district | Party | Votes | % | Result |
|---|---|---|---|---|---|
| 2013 legislative | Burgenland South | Social Democratic Party | 5,246 | 15.41% | Not elected |
| 2013 legislative | Burgenland | Social Democratic Party | 1,175 | 1.67% | Not elected |
| 2015 state | Oberwart | Social Democratic Party | 3,350 | 23.26% | Elected |
| 2019 legislative | Burgenland South | Social Democratic Party | 8,600 | 32.96% | Not elected |
| 2019 legislative | Burgenland | Social Democratic Party | 2,415 | 4.39% | Elected |
