= 2005 Burgenland state election =

← 2000	9 October 2005	2010 →

All 36 seats in the Landtag of Burgenland 19 seats needed for a majority All 7 seats in the state government
- Turnout: 197,127 (83.4%) ▼1.3%
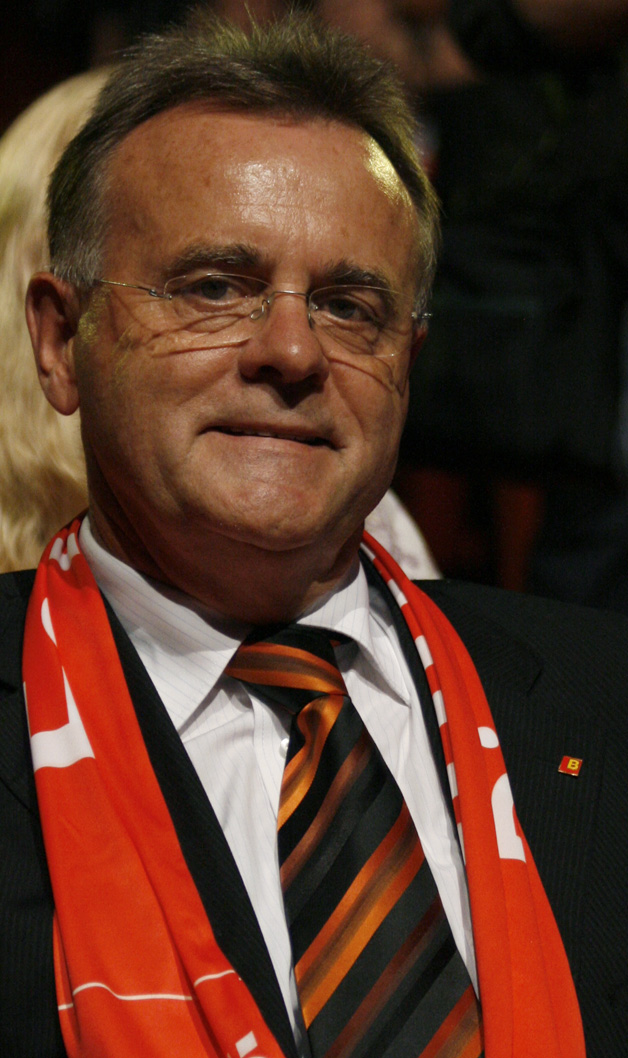

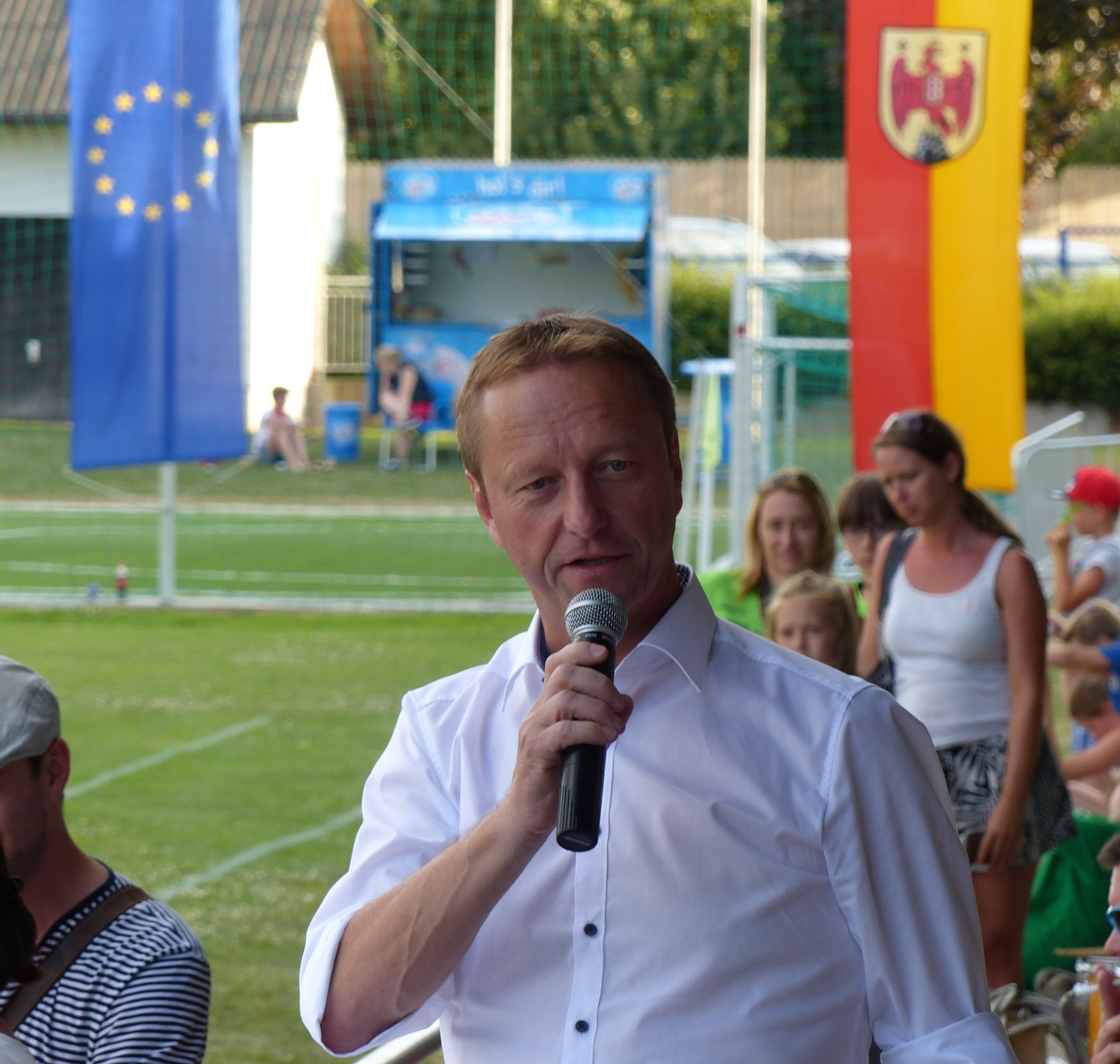
	First party	Second party
Leader	Hans Niessl	Franz Steindl
Party	SPÖ	ÖVP
Last election	17 seats, 46.5%	13 seats, 35.3%
Seats won	19	13
Seat change	▲2	0
Popular vote	100,497	70,057
Percentage	52.2%	36.4%
Swing	▲5.6%	▲1.1%
	Third party	Fourth party
Leader	Johann Tschürtz	Margarethe Krojer
Party	FPÖ	Greens
Last election	4 seats, 12.6%	2 seats, 5.5%
Seats won	2	2
Seat change	▼2	0
Popular vote	11,077	10,043
Percentage	5.8%	5.2%
Swing	▼6.9%	▼0.3%
Governor before election
Hans Niessl
SPÖ
Elected Governor
Hans Niessl
SPÖ

The 2005 Burgenland state election was held on 9 October 2005 to elect the members of the 19th Landtag of Burgenland.

The governing Social Democratic Party of Austria (SPÖ) won in a landslide, securing an absolute majority for the first time since 1982. This came to the detriment of the Freedom Party of Austria (FPÖ), which conversely suffered its worst result since 1982. The Austrian People's Party (ÖVP) stayed level on 13 seats.

The SPÖ could have governed alone thanks to its majority, but chose to renew its coalition with the ÖVP. Niessl was sworn in as Governor for a second term.

== Background ==
Prior to amendments made in 2014, the Burgenland constitution mandated that cabinet positions in the state government (state councillors, German: Landesräten) be allocated between parties proportionally in accordance with the share of votes won by each; this is known as Proporz. As such, the government was a perpetual coalition of all parties that qualified for at least one state councillor.

In the 2000 election, the SPÖ remained the largest party with 17 seats. The Greens entered the Landtag for the first time with two seats, while the ÖVP and FPÖ lost one each. The SPÖ formed a coalition with the ÖVP.

== Electoral system ==
The 36 seats of the Landtag of Burgenland are elected via open list proportional representation in a two-step process. The seats are distributed between seven multi-member constituencies, corresponding to the seven districts of Burgenland (the statutory cities of Eisenstadt and Rust are combined with Eisenstadt-Umgebung District). Apportionment of the seats is based on the results of the most recent census.

For parties to receive any representation in the Landtag, they must either win at least one seat in a constituency directly, or clear a 4 percent state-wide electoral threshold. Seats are distributed in constituencies according to the Hare quota, with any remaining seats allocated using the D'Hondt method at the state level, to ensure overall proportionality between a party's vote share and its share of seats.

In addition to voting for a political party, voters may cast preferential votes for specific candidates of that party, but are not required to do so. These additional votes do not affect the proportional allocation based on the vote for the party or list, but can change the rank order of candidates on a party's lists at the state and constituency level. Voters may cast one preferential vote at the state level, or three at the constituency level. A voter may not cross party-lines to cast a preference vote for a candidate of another party; such preference votes are invalid.

== Contesting parties ==
Name		Ideology	Leader	2000 result		
Name		Ideology	Leader	Votes (%)	Seats	Councillors
SPÖ	Social Democratic Party of Austria; Sozialdemokratische Partei Österreichs	Social democracy	Hans Niessl	46.5%	17 / 36	5 / 8
ÖVP	Austrian People's Party; Österreichische Volkspartei	Christian democracy	Franz Steindl	35.3%	13 / 36	3 / 8
FPÖ	Freedom Party of Austria; Freiheitliche Partei Österreichs	Right-wing populism Euroscepticism	Johann Tschürtz	12.6%	4 / 36	
GRÜNE	The Greens – The Green Alternative; Die Grünen – Die Grüne Alternative	Green politics	Margarethe Krojer	5.5%	2 / 36	

In addition to the parties already represented in the Landtag, one party collected enough signatures to be placed on the ballot.

- Austrian Citizens and Business Party (ÖBWP) – on the ballot in all constituencies except Oberpullendorf

== Results ==
Party	Votes	%	+/−	Seats	+/−	Coun.	+/−
Social Democratic Party of Austria (SPÖ)	100,497	52.18	+5.63	19	+2	4	–1
Austrian People's Party (ÖVP)	70,057	36.38	+1.05	13	±0	3	±0
Freedom Party of Austria (FPÖ)	11,077	5.75	–6.88	2	–2	0	±0
The Greens – The Green Alternative (GRÜNE)	10,043	5.21	–0.28	2	±0	0	±0
Austrian Citizens and Business Party (ÖBWP)	916	0.48	New	0	New	0	New
Invalid/blank votes	4,537	–	–	–	–	–	–
Total	197,127	100	–	36	0	7	–1
Registered voters/turnout	242,218	81.38	–1.34	–	–	–	–
Source: Burgenland Government

Popular vote
SPÖ	52.18%
ÖVP	36.38%
FPÖ	5.75%
GRÜNE	5.21%
ÖBWP	0.48%

Landtag seats
SPÖ	52.78%
ÖVP	36.11%
FPÖ	5.56%
GRÜNE	5.56%

=== Results by constituency ===
Constituency	SPÖ	ÖVP	FPÖ	Grüne	Other	Turnout
Constituency	%	%	%	%	%	Turnout
Neusiedl	55.1	34.6	5.1	4.7	0.4	80.5
Eisenstadt	49.5	36.5	6.2	7.1	0.7	81.8
Mattersburg	56.3	30.3	7.1	5.5	0.8	81.4
Oberpullendorf	51.1	37.1	7.2	4.7		83.2
Oberwart	53.7	35.8	5.7	4.2	0.6	80.9
Güssing	49.1	44.4	3.0	3.2	0.4	82.5
Jennersdorf	45.8	41.1	4.3	8.2	0.5	78.6
Total	52.2	36.4	5.8	5.2	0.5	81.4
Source: Vorarlberg Government
