= 2020 Burgenland state election =

Austrian state election

- 26 January 2020

All 36 seats in the Landtag of Burgenland 19 seats needed for a majority
- Turnout: 187,497 (74.9%) ▼1.1%
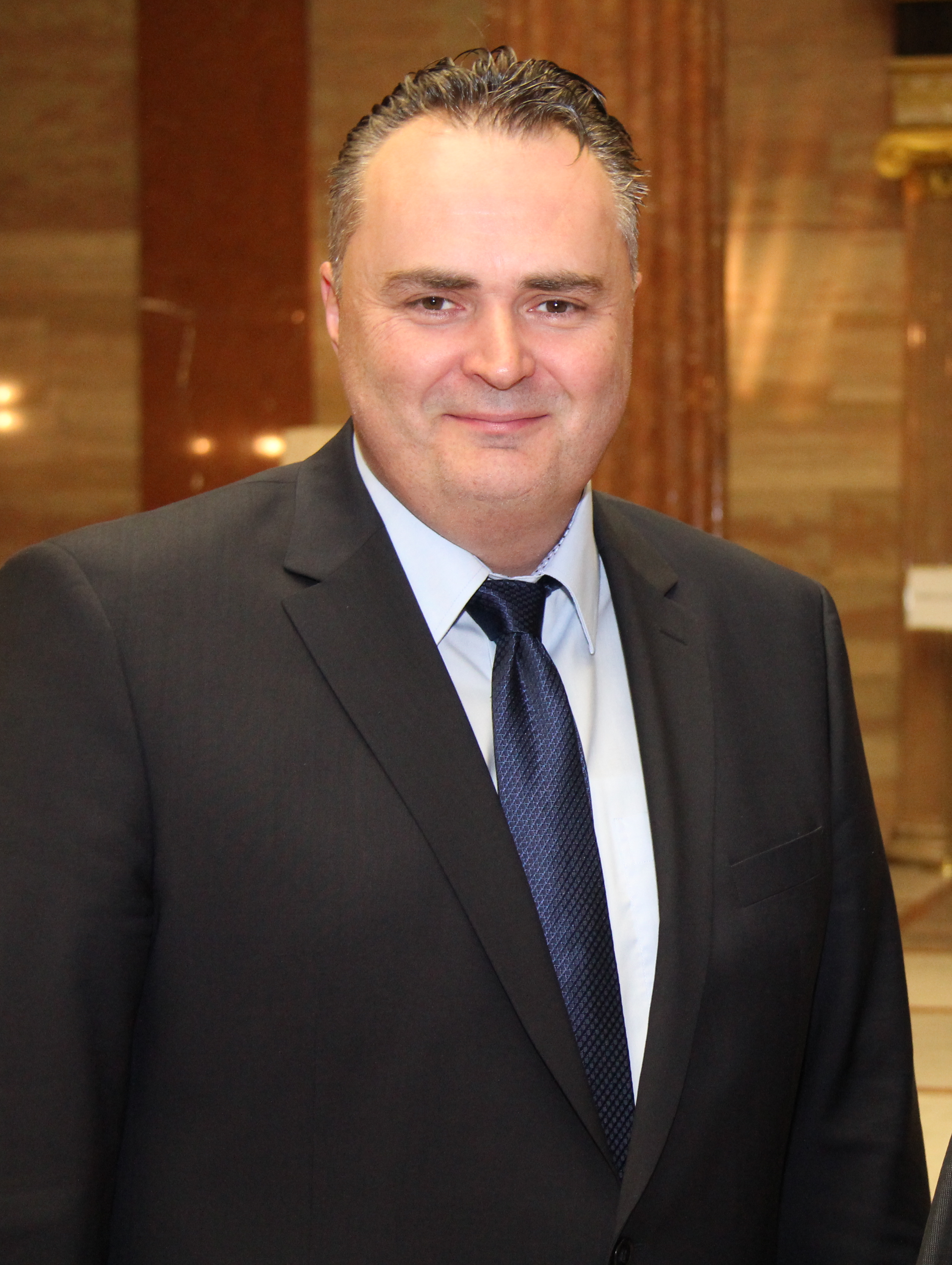

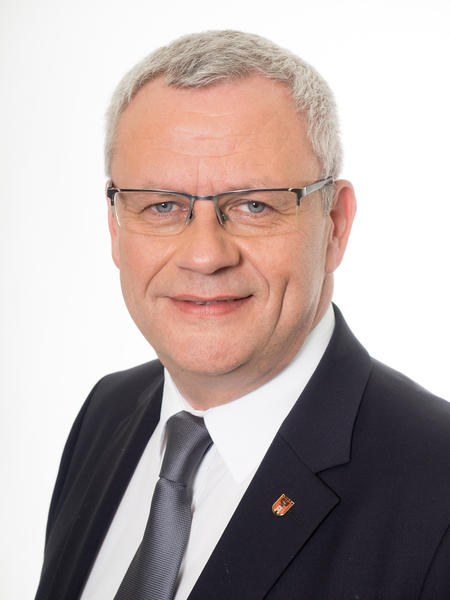

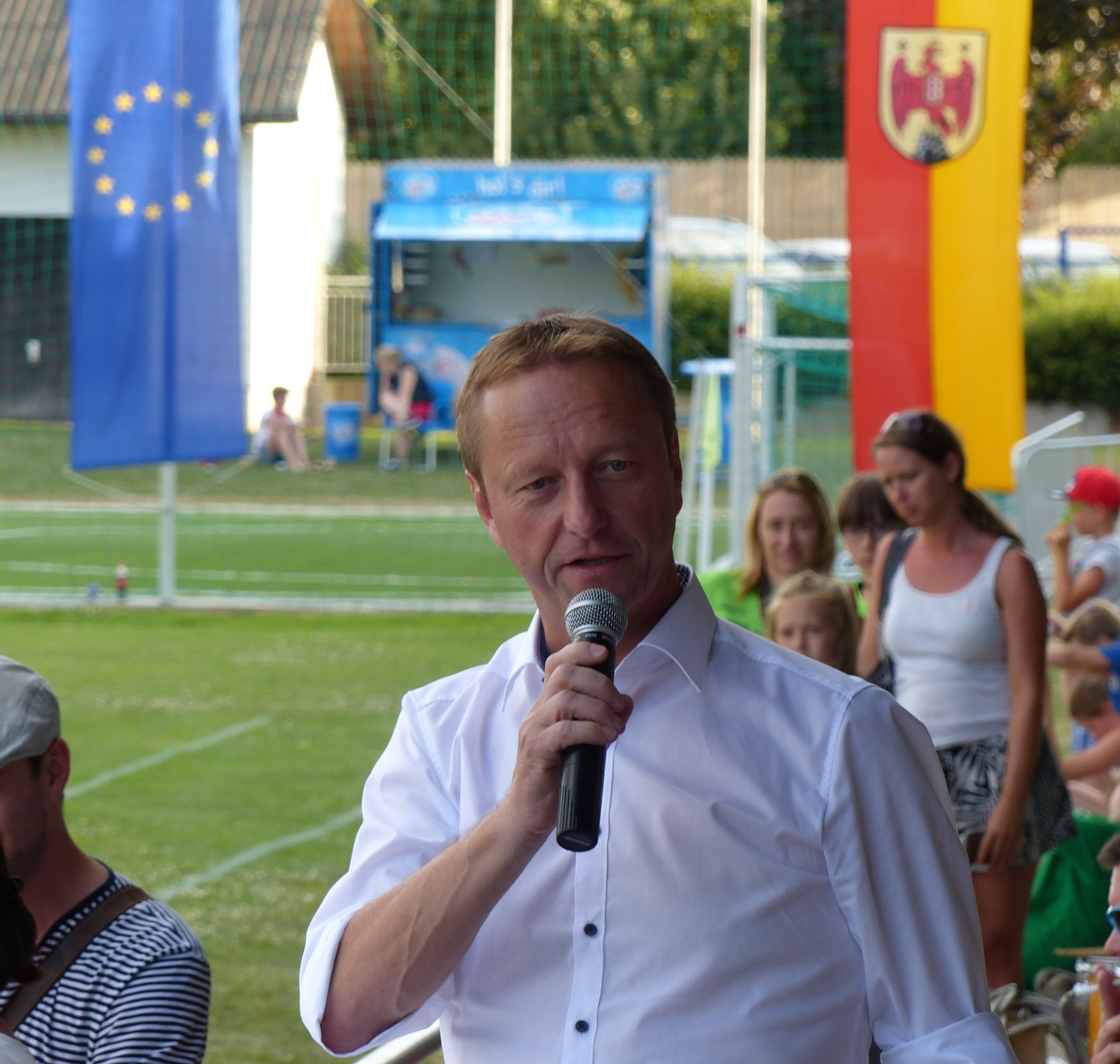
	First party	Second party	Third party
Leader	Hans Peter Doskozil	Thomas Steiner	Johann Tschürtz
Party	SPÖ	ÖVP	FPÖ
Last election	15 seats, 41.9%	11 seats, 29.1%	6 seats, 15.0%
Seats won	19	11	4
Seat change	▲4	0	▼2
Popular vote	92,633	56,728	18,160
Percentage	49.9%	30.6%	9.8%
Swing	▲8.0pp	▲1.5pp	▼5.2pp
	Fourth party	Fifth party
Leader	Regina Petrik	Manfred Kölly
Party	Greens	LBL
Last election	2 seats, 6.4%	2 seats, 4.8%
Seats won	2	0
Seat change	0	▼2
Popular vote	12,466	2,336
Percentage	6.7%	1.3%
Swing	▲0.3pp	▼3.6pp
- Results by municipality.
Governor before election
Hans Peter Doskozil
SPÖ
Elected Governor
Hans Peter Doskozil
SPÖ

The 2020 Burgenland state election was held on 26 January 2020 to elect the members of the 22nd Landtag of Burgenland. The snap election was called in the wake of the Ibiza affair in May 2019, which caused the Social Democratic Party of Austria (SPÖ) to terminate its coalition with the Freedom Party of Austria (FPÖ).

The centre-left SPÖ achieved its best result since 2005, winning an absolute majority on a swing of eight percentage points. The conservative Austrian People's Party (ÖVP) improved on its 2015 result, but did not gain any seats. The FPÖ lost a third of its votes, falling to 9.8% and four seats. The Greens stayed level, while List Burgenland (LBL) lost most of its votes and both of its seats. The net result was a shift of four seats to the SPÖ.

The SPÖ's unexpectedly strong result came after a string of election losses since 2017, including its worst-ever result in the 2019 federal election result three months earlier. Commentators attributed this to the conservative positions on immigration and national security taken by Governor Hans Peter Doskozil. Burgenland is a traditional stronghold of the SPÖ, who have governed the state continuously since 1964.

Due to its Landtag majority, the SPÖ did not seek a coalition partner, and entered government alone. Doskozil was sworn in as Governor for a second term on 17 February. Fellow SPÖ member Astrid Eisenkopf became Deputy Governor, the first woman to hold the position in Burgenland.

== Electoral system ==
The 36 seats of the Landtag of Burgenland are elected via open list proportional representation in a two-step process. The seats are distributed between seven multi-member constituencies, corresponding to the seven districts of Burgenland (the statutory cities of Eisenstadt and Rust are combined with Eisenstadt-Umgebung District). Apportionment of the seats is based on the results of the most recent census.

For parties to receive any representation in the Landtag, they must either win at least one seat in a constituency directly, or clear a 4 percent state-wide electoral threshold. Seats are distributed in constituencies according to the Hare quota, with any remaining seats allocated using the D'Hondt method at the state level, to ensure overall proportionality between a party's vote share and its share of seats.

In addition to voting for a political party, voters may cast preferential votes for specific candidates of that party, but are not required to do so. These additional votes do not affect the proportional allocation based on the vote for the party or list, but can change the rank order of candidates on a party's lists at the state and constituency level. Voters may cast one preferential vote at the state level, or three at the constituency level. A voter may not cross party-lines to cast a preference vote for a candidate of another party; such preference votes are invalid.

== Contesting parties ==
Name		Ideology	Leader	2015 result	
Name		Ideology	Leader	Votes (%)	Seats
SPÖ	Social Democratic Party of Austria; Sozialdemokratische Partei Österreichs	Social democracy	Hans Peter Doskozil	41.9%	15 / 36
ÖVP	Austrian People's Party; Österreichische Volkspartei	Christian democracy	Thomas Steiner	29.1%	11 / 36
FPÖ	Freedom Party of Austria; Freiheitliche Partei Österreichs	Right-wing populism Euroscepticism	Johann Tschürtz	15.0%	6 / 36
GRÜNE	The Greens – The Green Alternative; Die Grünen – Die Grüne Alternative	Green politics	Regina Petrik	6.4%	2 / 36
LBL	List Burgenland; Liste Burgenland	Regionalism	Manfred Kölly	4.8%	2 / 36
NEOS	NEOS – The New Austria and Liberal Forum; NEOS – Das Neue Österreich und Liberales Forum	Liberalism; Pro-Europeanism	Eduard Posch	2.3%	0 / 36

== Opinion polling ==
Polling firm	Fieldwork date	Sample size	SPÖ	ÖVP	FPÖ	Grüne	LBL	NEOS	Others	Lead
2020 state election	26 Jan 2020	–	49.9	30.6	9.8	6.7	1.3	1.7	–	19.3
Karmasin Research	January 2020	500	43.0	32.0	10.0	9.0	2.0	3.0	1.0	11.0
Hajek	29 Nov–16 Dec 2020	800	41–43	31–33	10–12	7–9	1–2	4	3–4	8–12
Hajek	March–April 2017	?	43.0	26.0	17.5	6.5	4.5	2.5	–	17.0
2015 state election	31 May 2015	–	41.9	29.1	15.0	6.4	4.8	2.3	0.4	12.8

== Results ==
Party	Votes	%	+/−	Seats	+/−
Social Democratic Party of Austria (SPÖ)	92,634	49.94	+8.02	19	+4
Austrian People's Party (ÖVP)	56,726	30.58	+1.50	11	±0
Freedom Party of Austria (FPÖ)	18,161	9.79	–5.25	4	–2
The Greens – The Green Alternative (GRÜNE)	12,466	6.72	+0.29	2	±0
NEOS – The New Austria (NEOS)	3,177	1.71	–0.62	0	±0
List Burgenland (LBL)	2,336	1.26	–3.56	0	–2
Invalid/blank votes	1,997	–	–	–	–
Total	187,497	100	–	36	0
Registered voters/turnout	250,181	74.94	–1.10	–	–
Source: Burgenland Government

Popular vote
SPÖ	49.94%
ÖVP	30.58%
FPÖ	9.79%
GRÜNE	6.72%
NEOS	1.71%
LBL	1.26%

Landtag seats
SPÖ	52.78%
ÖVP	30.56%
FPÖ	11.11%
GRÜNE	5.56%

=== Results by constituency ===
Constituency	SPÖ		ÖVP		FPÖ		Grüne		NEOS		LBL		Total seats	Turnout
Constituency	%	S	%	S	%	S	%	S	%	S	%	S	Total seats	Turnout
Neusiedl	48.9	3	31.5	2	10.2	0	6.0	0	1.6	0	0.7	0	5	73.9
Eisenstadt	46.5	3	32.7	2	9.2	0	8.9	0	1.8	0	1.0	0	5	75.1
Mattersburg	52.9	2	26.6	1	11.1	0	6.8	0	1.7	0	0.8	0	3	74.0
Oberpullendorf	50.4	2	31.2	1	7.3	0	5.7	0	1.3	0	4.0	0	3	78.1
Oberwart	53.6	3	28.1	1	10.5	0	5.4	0	1.9	0	0.5	0	4	75.8
Güssing	48.0	1	34.5	1	9.0	0	5.7	0	2.1	0	0.7	0	2	77.3
Jennersdorf	48.3	1	29.8	0	12.6	0	6.8	0	1.5	0	1.0	0	1	72.0
Remaining seats		4		3		4		2		0		0	13	
Total	49.9	19	30.6	11	9.8	4	6.7	2	1.7	0	1.3	0	36	74.9
Source: Burgenland Government

=== Preference votes ===
Alongside votes for a party, voters were able to cast a preferential votes for a candidate on the party list. The ten candidates with the most preferential votes on a state level were as follows:

Party	Pos.	Candidate	Votes
SPÖ	1	Hans Peter Doskozil	57,045
ÖVP	1	Thomas Steiner	16,655
FPÖ	1	Johann Tschürtz	7,948
GRÜNE	1	Regina Petrik	2,865
SPÖ	2	Astrid Eisenkopf	1,423
ÖVP	18	Patrik Fazekas	1,403
ÖVP	14	Walter Temmel	1,298
ÖVP	8	Christian Sagartz	1,270
ÖVP	3	Carina Laschober-Luif	1,218
ÖVP	6	Rudolf Strommer	1,207
