= 2015 Burgenland state election =

Austrian election

← 2010	31 May 2015	2020 →

All 36 seats in the Landtag of Burgenland 19 seats needed for a majority
- Turnout: 190,556 (76.0%) ▼1.3%
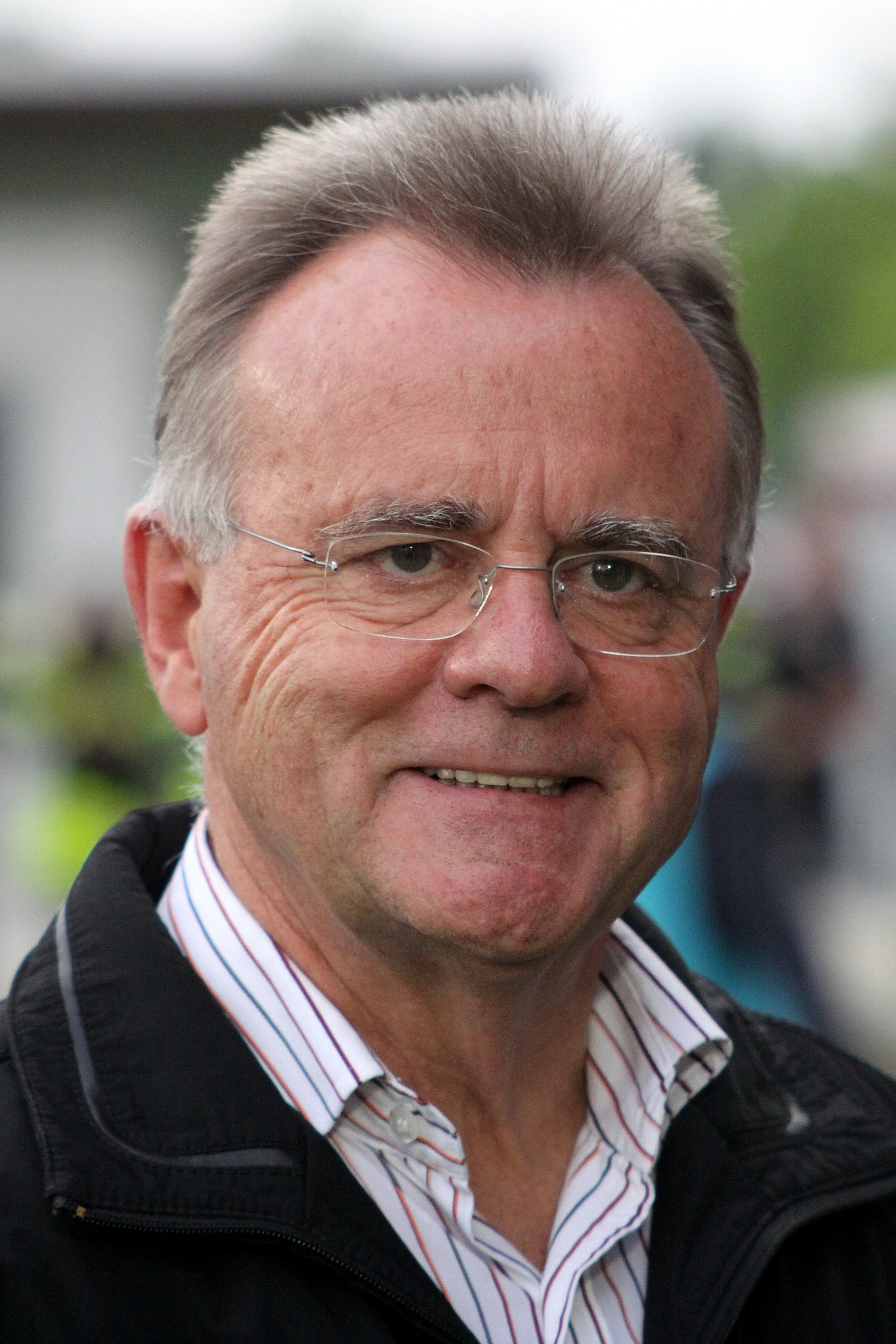

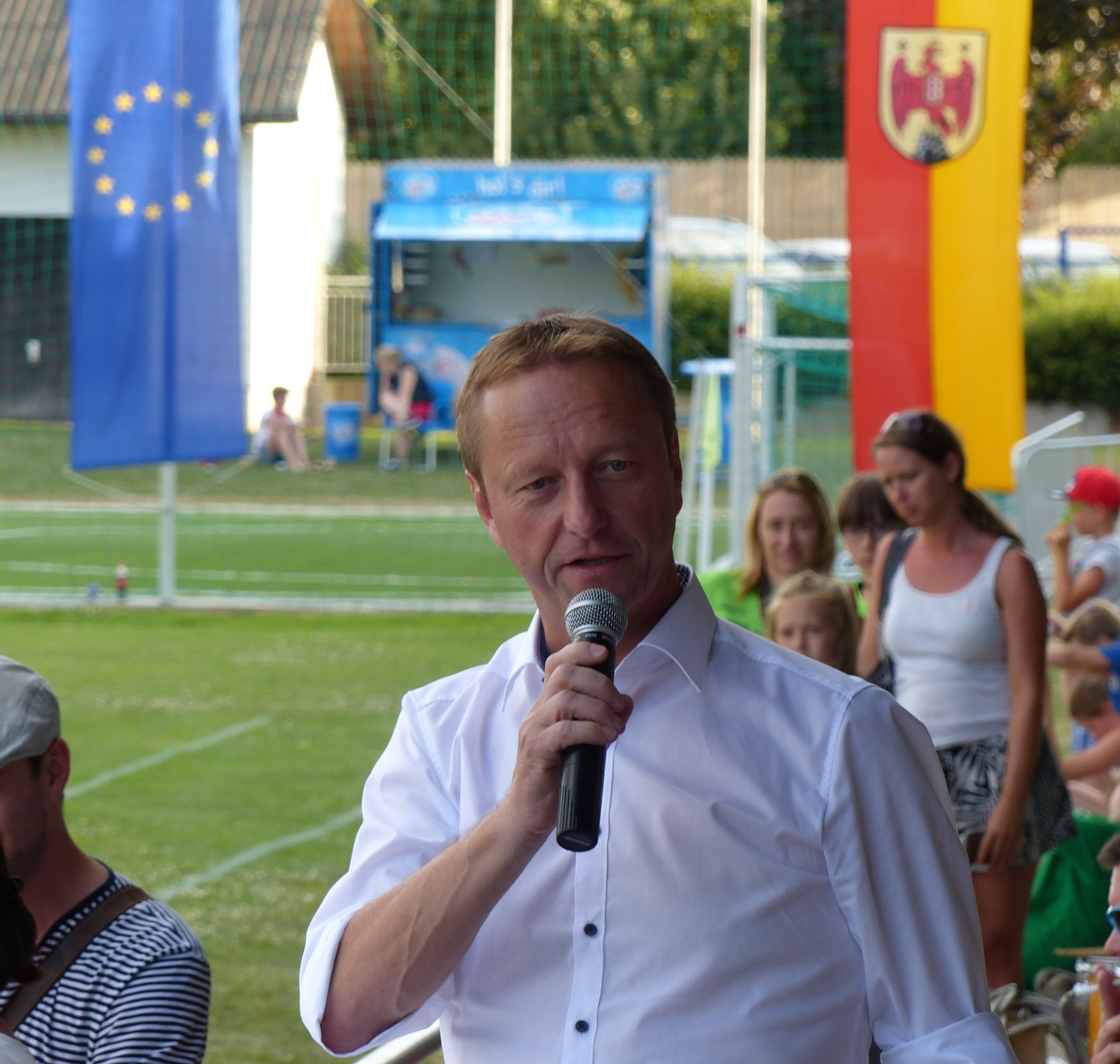
	First party	Second party	Third party
Leader	Hans Niessl	Franz Steindl	Johann Tschürtz
Party	SPÖ	ÖVP	FPÖ
Last election	18 seats, 48.3%	13 seats, 34.6%	3 seats, 9.0%
Seats won	15	11	6
Seat change	▼3	▼2	▲3
Popular vote	77,947	54,082	27,963
Percentage	41.9%	29.1%	15.0%
Swing	▼6.3%	▼5.5%	▲6.1%
	Fourth party	Fifth party
Leader	Regina Petrik	Manfred Kölly
Party	Greens	LBL
Last election	1 seat, 4.1%	1 seat, 4.0%
Seats won	2	2
Seat change	▲1	▲1
Popular vote	11,964	8,970
Percentage	6.4%	4.8%
Swing	▲2.3%	▲0.8%
Governor before election
Hans Niessl
SPÖ
Elected Governor
Hans Niessl
SPÖ

The 2015 Burgenland state election was held on 31 May 2015 to elect the members of the 21st Landtag of Burgenland.

The two major parties, the governing Social Democratic Party of Austria (SPÖ) and Austrian People's Party (ÖVP), both lost votes. The three minor parties made gains and each doubled their representation in the Landtag.

With the SPÖ falling substantially short of a majority, they required a coalition partner to govern. They subsequently formed a coalition with the Freedom Party of Austria (FPÖ), violating the party's federal directive not to work with FPÖ in government. The decision was subject to backlash and protests, but the coalition took office regardless.

== Background ==
In the 2010 election, the SPÖ won 48.3% of votes and fell one seat short of an absolute majority. They thus negotiated a working agreement with the ÖVP.

Before amendments made in 2014, the Burgenland constitution required that cabinet positions in the state government be distributed proportionally among parties based on their share of the votes received. This practice is commonly referred to as Proporz. As such, the government was a perpetual coalition of all parties that qualified for at least one cabinet position. In December 2014, the SPÖ and ÖVP voted to amend the constitution to remove this requirement. As such, the 2015 election was the first in post-war Burgenland history in which conventional coalition formation could take place.

== Electoral system ==
The 36 seats of the Landtag of Burgenland are elected via open list proportional representation in a two-step process. The seats are distributed between seven multi-member constituencies, corresponding to the seven districts of Burgenland (the statutory cities of Eisenstadt and Rust are combined with Eisenstadt-Umgebung District). Apportionment of the seats is based on the results of the most recent census.

For parties to receive any representation in the Landtag, they must either win at least one seat in a constituency directly, or clear a 4 percent state-wide electoral threshold. Seats are distributed in constituencies according to the Hare quota, with any remaining seats allocated using the D'Hondt method at the state level, to ensure overall proportionality between a party's vote share and its share of seats.

In addition to voting for a political party, voters may cast preferential votes for specific candidates of that party, but are not required to do so. These additional votes do not affect the proportional allocation based on the vote for the party or list, but can change the rank order of candidates on a party's lists at the state and constituency level. Voters may cast one preferential vote at the state level, or three at the constituency level. A voter may not cross party lines to cast a preference vote for a candidate of another party; such preference votes are invalid.

== Contesting parties ==
Name		Ideology	Leader	2010 result		
Name		Ideology	Leader	Votes (%)	Seats	Councillors
SPÖ	Social Democratic Party of Austria; Sozialdemokratische Partei Österreichs	Social democracy	Hans Niessl	48.3%	18 / 36	4 / 7
ÖVP	Austrian People's Party; Österreichische Volkspartei	Christian democracy	Franz Steindl	34.6%	13 / 36	3 / 7
FPÖ	Freedom Party of Austria; Freiheitliche Partei Österreichs	Right-wing populism Euroscepticism	Johann Tschürtz	9.0%	3 / 36	
GRÜNE	The Greens – The Green Alternative; Die Grünen – Die Grüne Alternative	Green politics	Regina Petrik	4.1%	1 / 36	
LBL	List Burgenland; Liste Burgenland	Regionalism	Manfred Kölly	4.0%	1 / 36	

In addition to the parties already represented in the Landtag, four parties collected enough signatures to be placed on the ballot.

- NEOS – The New Austria and Liberal Forum (NEOS)
- Christian Party of Austria (CPÖ)

== Opinion polling ==
Polling firm	Fieldwork date	Sample size	SPÖ	ÖVP	FPÖ	Grüne	LBL	NEOS	Lead
2015 state election	31 May 2015	–	41.9	29.1	15.0	6.4	4.8	2.3	12.8
Gallup	21–23 Apr 2015	400	44	31	13	6	3	3	13
Hajek	April 2015	1,000	46	30	12	6	3	3	16
2010 state election	30 May 2010	–	48.3	34.6	9.0	4.1	4.0	–	13.7

== Results ==
Party	Votes	%	+/−	Seats	+/−
Social Democratic Party of Austria (SPÖ)	77,947	41.92	–6.34	15	–3
Austrian People's Party (ÖVP)	54,082	29.08	–5.54	11	–2
Freedom Party of Austria (FPÖ)	27,963	15.04	+6.06	6	+3
The Greens – The Green Alternative (GRÜNE)	11,964	6.43	+2.28	2	+1
List Burgenland (LBL)	8,970	4.82	+0.82	2	+1
NEOS – The New Austria (NEOS)	4,337	2.33	New	0	New
Christian Party of Austria (CPÖ)	699	0.38	+0.38	0	±0
Invalid/blank votes	4,594	–	–	–	–
Total	190,556	100	–	36	0
Registered voters/turnout	250,607	76.04	–1.26	–	–
Source: Burgenland Government

Popular vote
SPÖ	41.92%
ÖVP	29.08%
FPÖ	15.04%
GRÜNE	6.43%
LBL	4.82%
NEOS	2.33%
CPÖ	0.38%

Landtag seats
SPÖ	41.67%
ÖVP	30.56%
FPÖ	16.67%
GRÜNE	5.56%
LBL	5.56%

=== Results by constituency ===
Constituency	SPÖ		ÖVP		FPÖ		Grüne		LBL		NEOS		Others	Total seats	Turnout
Constituency	%	S	%	S	%	S	%	S	%	S	%	S	%	Total seats	Turnout
Neusiedl	44.5	3	28.0	1	15.9	1	6.0		2.5		2.6		0.5	5	73.9
Eisenstadt	39.4	2	30.7	2	13.3		8.6		5.1		2.6		0.4	4	76.2
Mattersburg	46.5	2	22.5	1	15.9		6.4		6.0		2.5		0.3	3	75.0
Oberpullendorf	42.5	2	30.7	1	10.2		5.7		9.4		1.9			3	79.1
Oberwart	41.6	2	27.6	1	18.0	1	6.3		3.6		2.3		0.5	4	75.8
Güssing	39.9	1	35.0	1	14.7		5.2		3.0		1.8		0.4	2	78.6
Jennersdorf	35.3		32.2		19.2		6.4		4.5		2.0		0.4	0	74.2
Remaining seats		3		4		4		2		2		0		15	
Total	41.9	15	29.1	11	15.0	6	6.4	2	4.8	2	2.3	0	0.4	36	76.0
Source: Burgenland Government

=== Preference votes ===
Alongside votes for a party, voters were able to cast a preferential votes for a candidate on the party list. The ten candidates with the most preferential votes on a state level were as follows:

Party	Pos.	Candidate	Votes
SPÖ	1	Hans Niessl	33,607
ÖVP	1	Franz Steindl	13,707
FPÖ	1	Johann Tschürtz	9,048
LBL	1	Manfred Kölly	3,468
GRÜNE	1	Regina Petrik	3,215
FPÖ	2	Ilse Benkö	2,365
ÖVP	6	Walter Temmel	2,199
ÖVP	14	Patrik Fazekas	2,010
SPÖ	4	Verena Dunst	1,962
ÖVP	2	Michaela Resetar	1,496
