= Andrea Fraunschiel =

Austrian politician (1955–2019)

- Fraunschiel in 2016

Mayor of Eisenstadt
- In office 2007–2011
- Succeeded by: Thomas Steiner

Member of the Landtag of Burgenland
- In office 2005–2007

Member of the Federal Council of Austria
- In office 2004–2005

Personal details
- Born: 8 May 1955 Eisenstadt, Austria
- Died: 4 August 2019 (aged 64) Eisenstadt, Austria
- Party: Austrian People's Party
- Education: University of Vienna

Andrea Fraunschiel (8 May 1955 – 4 August 2019) was an Austrian politician who was a member of the Federal Council of Austria, member of the Landtag of Burgenland, and mayor of Eisenstadt.

== Politics ==
On 10 November 1992, Fraunschiel was first elected to the city council of her home town of Eisenstadt. From 2002 she held the office of deputy mayor, and on 24 January 2007 she was elected mayor of the city.

From 2004 to 2005 Fraunschiel was a member of the Federal Council, and was then elected to the state parliament of Burgenland in the 2005 elections.

Fraunschiel was a member of the Austrian People's Party (ÖVP). Starting in 2011 she led the ÖVP women's organisation in Burgenland.

She remained mayor of Eisenstadt until November 2011, when she was succeeded by Thomas Steiner. In 2015, the city honoured Fraunschiel by naming her an honorary citizen.

== Personal life ==
Fraunschiel was born in Eisenstadt in 1955. She studied English and history at the University of Vienna from 1973 to 1978. She worked in adult education.

Fraunschiel died on 4 August 2019 at the age of 64.
