= Michel Reimon =

Austrian politician

Michel Reimon MEP
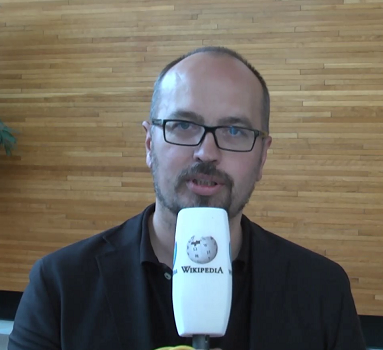

Member of the European Parliament
- In office 1 July 2014 – 2019
- Constituency: Austria

Personal details
- Born: 11 July 1971 (age 55) Eisenstadt, Burgenland, Austria
- Party: Austrian; The Greens-The Green Alternative; EU; European Green Party
- Education: University of Augsburg; Johns Hopkins University; Columbia University
- Website: www.reimon.net

Michel Reimon (born 11 July 1971) is an Austrian politician who has been serving as a member of the National Council since 2019. He is a member of The Greens-The Green Alternative, part of the European Green Party.

== Political career ==
Reimon served as a Member of the European Parliament (MEP) from 2014 until 2019. In parliament, he was a member of the Committee on Industry, Research and Energy (ITRE) and the delegation for relations with the Mashreq countries.

In addition to his committee assignments, Reimon has been a member of the Austrian delegation to the Parliamentary Assembly of the Council of Europe (PACE) since 2020, where he serves on the Committee on Legal Affairs and Human Rights.
