= List Burgenland =

Political party in Austria, operating in the federal state of Burgenland

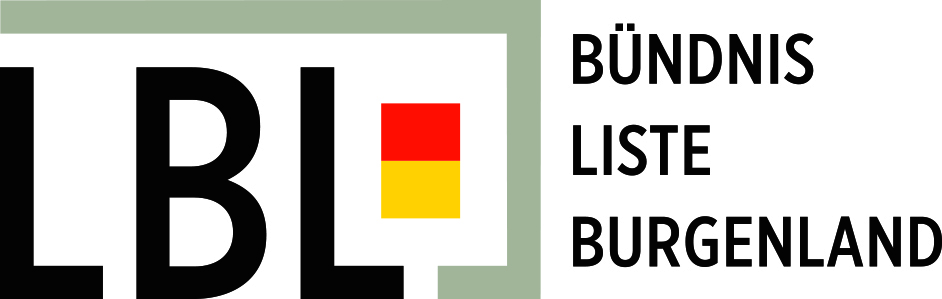
- Leader: Manfred Kölly
- Founded: January 17, 2010
- Split from: Freedom Party of Austria
- Ideology: Civic nationalism Decentralisation; Direct democracy Right-wing populism
- Political position: Right-wing
- National affiliation: Free List Austria
- State Parliament of Burgenland: 0 / 36

The List Burgenland (German: Liste Burgenland, LBL) is a political party in Austria, operating in the federal state of Burgenland. It was founded in 2010 with support of the Free Citizens' List (FBL).

At the 2010 state election, the List Burgenland got 4.0% of the popular vote and 1 out of 36 seats. They increased their proportion of the vote to 4.8% at the next election, winning 2 seats.

In the 2020 state election, the party lost both its 2 seats partially due to the Ibiza-gate scandal which had negatively impacted right wing party support.

== Election results ==
=== Landtag ===
Year	Votes	%	+/-	Seats	+/-	Notes
2010	7,559	4.0%	New	1 / 36	New	
2015	8,970	4.8%	▲0.8%	2 / 36	▲1	with Team Stronach
2020	2,336	1.26%	▼3.56%	0 / 36	▼2	
2025	1,622	0.83%	▼0.43%	0 / 36	Steady	with Liste Hausverstand

=== Nationalrat ===
Year	Votes	%	+/-	Notes
2008	2,443	1.26%	New	with Citizens' Forum Austria
2017	229	0.13%	▼1.13%	with Free List Austria
2024	156	0.08%	▼0.05%	with The Yellows
