= Burgenland South (National Council electoral district) =

Parliamentary electoral district in Austria

- Burgenland Süd; Gradišće južno
- Electoral District for the National Council
- Location of Burgenland South within Austria
- District: List: Güssing; Jennersdorf; Oberpullendorf; Oberwart
- State: Burgenland
- Population: 136,293 (2024)
- Electorate: 109,467 (2019)
- Area: 2,173 km^{2} (2023)

Current Electoral District
- Created: 1994
- Seats: List: 3 (2002–present); 4 (1994–2002)
- Members: Nikolaus Berlakovich (ÖVP)

Burgenland South (German: Burgenland Süd; Croatian: Gradišće južno), also known as Electoral District 1B (German: Wahlkreis 1B), is one of the 39 multi-member regional electoral districts of the National Council, the lower house of the Austrian Parliament, the national legislature of Austria. The electoral district was created in 1992 when electoral regulations were amended to add regional electoral districts to the existing state-wide electoral districts and came into being at the following legislative election in 1994. It consists of the districts of Güssing, Jennersdorf, Oberpullendorf and Oberwart in the state of Burgenland. The electoral district currently elects three of the 183 members of the National Council using the open party-list proportional representation electoral system. At the 2019 legislative election the constituency had 109,467 registered electors.

== History ==
Burgenland South was one 43 regional electoral districts (regionalwahlkreise) established by the "National Council Electoral Regulations 1992" (Nationalrats-Wahlordnung 1992) passed by the National Council in 1992. It consisted of the districts of Güssing, Jennersdorf, Oberpullendorf and Oberwart in the state of Burgenland. The district was initially allocated four seats in May 1993. Electoral regulations require the allocation of seats amongst the electoral districts to be recalculated following each national census and in September 2002 the number of seats allocated to Burgenland South was reduced to three based on the population as at the 2001 national census.

== Electoral system ==
Burgenland South currently elects three of the 183 members of the National Council using the open party-list proportional representation electoral system. The allocation of seats is carried out in three stages. In the first stage, seats are allocated to parties (lists) at the regional level using a state-wide Hare quota (wahlzahl) (valid votes in the state divided by the number of seats in the state). In the second stage, seats are allocated to parties at the state/provincial level using the state-wide Hare quota (any seats won by the party at the regional stage are subtracted from the party's state seats). In the third and final stage, seats are allocated to parties at the federal/national level using the D'Hondt method (any seats won by the party at the regional and state stages are subtracted from the party's federal seats). Only parties that reach the 4% national threshold, or have won a seat at the regional stage, compete for seats at the state and federal stages.

Electors may cast one preferential vote for individual candidates at the regional, state and federal levels. Split-ticket voting (panachage), or voting for more than one candidate at each level, is not permitted and will result in the ballot paper being invalidated. At the regional level, candidates must receive preferential votes amounting to at least 14% of the valid votes cast for their party to over-ride the order of the party list (10% and 7% respectively for the state and federal levels). Prior to April 2013 electors could not cast preferential votes at the federal level and the thresholds candidates needed to over-ride the party list order were higher at the regional level (half the Hare quota or 1/6 of the party votes) and state level (Hare quota).

== Election results ==
=== Summary ===
Election	Communists KPÖ+ / KPÖ			Social Democrats SPÖ			Greens GRÜNE			NEOS NEOS / LiF			People's ÖVP			Freedom FPÖ		
Election	Votes	%	Seats	Votes	%	Seats	Votes	%	Seats	Votes	%	Seats	Votes	%	Seats	Votes	%	Seats
2019	328	0.37%	0	26,093	29.72%	0	6,029	6.87%	0	3,540	4.03%	0	34,557	39.36%	1	15,982	18.21%	0
2017	294	0.32%	0	29,884	32.59%	1	1,666	1.82%	0	2,202	2.40%	0	30,637	33.42%	1	23,985	26.16%	0
2013	378	0.42%	0	34,037	37.61%	1	5,296	5.85%	0	1,995	2.20%	0	25,501	28.18%	0	15,287	16.89%	0
2008	337	0.36%	0	37,326	39.71%	1	4,755	5.06%	0	795	0.85%	0	28,946	30.79%	1	14,685	15.62%	0
2006	457	0.49%	0	41,023	44.32%	1	4,682	5.06%	0				35,182	38.01%	1	7,570	8.18%	0
2002	220	0.23%	0	42,390	44.81%	1	3,934	4.16%	0	334	0.35%	0	41,951	44.35%	1	5,771	6.10%	0
1999	199	0.22%	0	38,392	41.67%	1	3,048	3.31%	0	1,405	1.52%	0	29,654	32.18%	1	18,921	20.53%	0
1995	100	0.11%	0	40,979	43.88%	1	2,168	2.32%	0	2,673	2.86%	0	31,249	33.46%	1	15,687	16.80%	0
1994	79	0.08%	0	40,831	43.72%	1	3,156	3.38%	0	2,417	2.59%	0	31,443	33.67%	1	14,970	16.03%	0

=== Detailed ===
==== 2010s ====
===== 2019 =====
Results of the 2019 legislative election held on 29 September 2019:

Party		Votes per district					Total votes	%	Seats
Party		Güs- sing	Jen- ners- dorf	Ober- pullen- dorf	Ober- wart	Voting card	Total votes	%	Seats
Austrian People's Party	ÖVP	7,357	4,526	10,416	12,172	86	34,557	39.36%	1
Social Democratic Party of Austria	SPÖ	4,935	2,669	8,077	10,356	56	26,093	29.72%	0
Freedom Party of Austria	FPÖ	2,828	2,366	3,628	7,101	59	15,982	18.21%	0
The Greens – The Green Alternative	GRÜNE	1,087	890	1,519	2,435	98	6,029	6.87%	0
NEOS – The New Austria and Liberal Forum	NEOS	636	460	1,024	1,381	39	3,540	4.03%	0
JETZT	JETZT	147	147	257	392	12	955	1.09%	0
KPÖ Plus	KPÖ+	59	58	91	119	1	328	0.37%	0
Der Wandel	WANDL	39	30	53	73	2	197	0.22%	0
Christian Party of Austria	CPÖ	21	11	33	40	1	106	0.12%	0
Valid Votes		17,109	11,157	25,098	34,069	354	87,787	100.00%	1
Rejected Votes		227	166	406	506	5	1,310	1.47%	
Total Polled		17,336	11,323	25,504	34,575	359	89,097	81.39%	
Registered Electors		21,151	14,311	30,701	43,304		109,467		
Turnout		81.96%	79.12%	83.07%	79.84%		81.39%		

The following candidates were elected:

- Personal mandates - Nikolaus Berlakovich (ÖVP), 10,736 votes.

===== 2017 =====
Results of the 2017 legislative election held on 15 October 2017:

Party		Votes per district					Total votes	%	Seats
Party		Güs- sing	Jen- ners- dorf	Ober- pullen- dorf	Ober- wart	Voting card	Total votes	%	Seats
Austrian People's Party	ÖVP	6,568	3,878	9,345	10,757	89	30,637	33.42%	1
Social Democratic Party of Austria	SPÖ	5,631	3,136	9,214	11,785	118	29,884	32.59%	1
Freedom Party of Austria	FPÖ	4,372	3,710	5,655	10,164	84	23,985	26.16%	0
Peter Pilz List	PILZ	405	326	591	861	32	2,215	2.42%	0
NEOS – The New Austria and Liberal Forum	NEOS	400	287	573	909	33	2,202	2.40%	0
The Greens – The Green Alternative	GRÜNE	310	244	454	622	36	1,666	1.82%	0
My Vote Counts!	GILT	101	87	162	207	8	565	0.62%	0
Communist Party of Austria	KPÖ	40	47	80	119	8	294	0.32%	0
Free List Austria	FLÖ	12	14	77	41	0	144	0.16%	0
The Whites	WEIßE	11	19	29	32	1	92	0.10%	0
Valid Votes		17,850	11,748	26,180	35,497	409	91,684	100.00%	2
Rejected Votes		160	99	276	368	2	905	0.98%	
Total Polled		18,010	11,847	26,456	35,865	411	92,589	84.10%	
Registered Electors		21,329	14,381	30,965	43,420		110,095		
Turnout		84.44%	82.38%	85.44%	82.60%		84.10%		

The following candidates were elected:

- Personal mandates - Nikolaus Berlakovich (ÖVP), 7,916 votes.
- Party mandates - Klaudia Friedl (SPÖ), 1,639 votes. (Note: SPÖ: 1st placed candidate Hans Peter Doskozil renounced his mandate.)

===== 2013 =====
Results of the 2013 legislative election held on 29 September 2013:

Party		Votes per district					Total votes	%	Seats
Party		Güs- sing	Jen- ners- dorf	Ober- pullen- dorf	Ober- wart	Voting card	Total votes	%	Seats
Social Democratic Party of Austria	SPÖ	6,423	3,641	10,588	13,309	76	34,037	37.61%	1
Austrian People's Party	ÖVP	5,598	3,094	7,977	8,767	65	25,501	28.18%	0
Freedom Party of Austria	FPÖ	2,676	2,407	3,706	6,450	48	15,287	16.89%	0
Team Stronach	FRANK	1,281	973	1,384	2,098	22	5,758	6.36%	0
The Greens – The Green Alternative	GRÜNE	952	816	1,373	2,085	70	5,296	5.85%	0
NEOS – The New Austria	NEOS	375	259	523	803	35	1,995	2.20%	0
Alliance for the Future of Austria	BZÖ	320	271	383	700	17	1,691	1.87%	0
Communist Party of Austria	KPÖ	71	60	98	146	3	378	0.42%	0
Pirate Party of Austria	PIRAT	53	58	117	111	3	342	0.38%	0
Christian Party of Austria	CPÖ	37	35	68	75	1	216	0.24%	0
Valid Votes		17,786	11,614	26,217	34,544	340	90,501	100.00%	1
Rejected Votes		346	270	603	688	6	1,913	2.07%	
Total Polled		18,132	11,884	26,820	35,232	346	92,414	83.00%	
Registered Electors		21,803	14,705	31,252	43,578		111,338		
Turnout		83.16%	80.82%	85.82%	80.85%		83.00%		

The following candidates were elected:

- Personal mandates - Norbert Darabos (SPÖ), 7,332 votes.

Substitutions:

- Norbert Darabos (SPÖ) resigned on 8 July 2015 and was replaced by Jürgen Schabhüttl (SPÖ) on 15 July 2015.

==== 2000s ====
===== 2008 =====
Results of the 2008 legislative election held on 28 September 2008:

Party		Votes per district					Total votes	%	Seats
Party		Güs- sing	Jen- ners- dorf	Ober- pullen- dorf	Ober- wart	Voting card	Total votes	%	Seats
Social Democratic Party of Austria	SPÖ	6,887	3,999	11,263	14,854	323	37,326	39.71%	1
Austrian People's Party	ÖVP	6,589	3,592	8,404	10,111	250	28,946	30.79%	1
Freedom Party of Austria	FPÖ	2,666	2,065	3,438	6,346	170	14,685	15.62%	0
Alliance for the Future of Austria	BZÖ	1,061	964	956	1,985	58	5,024	5.34%	0
The Greens – The Green Alternative	GRÜNE	824	790	1,221	1,774	146	4,755	5.06%	0
Fritz Dinkhauser List – Citizens' Forum Tyrol	FRITZ	134	95	766	252	15	1,262	1.34%	0
Liberal Forum	LiF	145	102	211	300	37	795	0.85%	0
Independent Citizens' Initiative Save Austria	RETTÖ	88	60	183	154	7	492	0.52%	0
Communist Party of Austria	KPÖ	74	50	96	111	6	337	0.36%	0
The Christians	DC	60	28	119	126	1	334	0.36%	0
Left	LINKE	5	5	20	18	0	48	0.05%	0
Valid Votes		18,533	11,750	26,677	36,031	1,013	94,004	100.00%	2
Rejected Votes		503	379	681	949	11	2,523	2.61%	
Total Polled		19,036	12,129	27,358	36,980	1,024	96,527	86.41%	
Registered Electors		22,149	14,717	31,178	43,666		111,710		
Turnout		85.95%	82.41%	87.75%	84.69%		86.41%		

The following candidates were elected:

- Personal mandates - Franz Glaser (ÖVP), 5,689 votes; and Erwin Kaipel (SPÖ), 7,120 votes.

===== 2006 =====
Results of the 2006 legislative election held on 1 October 2006:

Party		Votes per district					Total votes	%	Seats
Party		Güs- sing	Jen- ners- dorf	Ober- pullen- dorf	Ober- wart	Voting card	Total votes	%	Seats
Social Democratic Party of Austria	SPÖ	7,412	4,535	11,615	16,385	1,076	41,023	44.32%	1
Austrian People's Party	ÖVP	7,830	4,462	9,729	12,142	1,019	35,182	38.01%	1
Freedom Party of Austria	FPÖ	1,100	1,041	2,272	2,919	238	7,570	8.18%	0
The Greens – The Green Alternative	GRÜNE	778	707	1,068	1,657	472	4,682	5.06%	0
Alliance for the Future of Austria	BZÖ	321	314	268	680	46	1,629	1.76%	0
Hans-Peter Martin's List	MATIN	293	233	401	618	52	1,597	1.73%	0
Communist Party of Austria	KPÖ	103	77	91	157	29	457	0.49%	0
Initiative 2000	IVE	22	16	326	47	16	427	0.46%	0
Valid Votes		17,859	11,385	25,770	34,605	2,948	92,567	100.00%	2
Rejected Votes		412	359	484	818	32	2,105	2.22%	
Total Polled		18,271	11,744	26,254	35,423	2,980	94,672	86.94%	
Registered Electors		21,676	14,439	30,333	42,450		108,898		
Turnout		84.29%	81.34%	86.55%	83.45%		86.94%		

The following candidates were elected:

- Personal mandates - Franz Glaser (ÖVP), 7,870 votes; and Erwin Kaipel (SPÖ), 10,139 votes.

===== 2002 =====
Results of the 2002 legislative election held on 24 November 2002:

Party		Votes per district					Total votes	%	Seats
Party		Güs- sing	Jen- ners- dorf	Ober- pullen- dorf	Ober- wart	Voting card	Total votes	%	Seats
Social Democratic Party of Austria	SPÖ	7,697	4,635	12,164	16,904	990	42,390	44.81%	1
Austrian People's Party	ÖVP	9,118	5,606	11,518	14,463	1,246	41,951	44.35%	1
Freedom Party of Austria	FPÖ	974	914	1,422	2,282	179	5,771	6.10%	0
The Greens – The Green Alternative	GRÜNE	609	516	960	1,387	462	3,934	4.16%	0
Liberal Forum	LiF	64	46	72	127	25	334	0.35%	0
Communist Party of Austria	KPÖ	39	33	62	82	4	220	0.23%	0
Valid Votes		18,501	11,750	26,198	35,245	2,906	94,600	100.00%	2
Rejected Votes		272	225	421	578	20	1,516	1.58%	
Total Polled		18,773	11,975	26,619	35,823	2,926	96,116	89.74%	
Registered Electors		21,393	14,204	29,875	41,632		107,104		
Turnout		87.75%	84.31%	89.10%	86.05%		89.74%		

The following candidates were elected:

- Personal mandates - Franz Glaser (ÖVP), 9,572 votes; and Erwin Kaipel (SPÖ), 9,799 votes.

==== 1990s ====
===== 1999 =====
Results of the 1999 legislative election held on 3 October 1999:

Party		Votes per district					Total votes	%	Seats
Party		Güs- sing	Jen- ners- dorf	Ober- pullen- dorf	Ober- wart	Voting card	Total votes	%	Seats
Social Democratic Party of Austria	SPÖ	7,234	4,275	10,906	14,873	1,104	38,392	41.67%	1
Austrian People's Party	ÖVP	6,628	3,638	8,693	9,998	697	29,654	32.18%	1
Freedom Party of Austria	FPÖ	3,509	2,949	4,582	7,378	503	18,921	20.53%	0
The Greens – The Green Alternative	GRÜNE	444	394	730	1,238	242	3,048	3.31%	0
Liberal Forum	LiF	192	163	369	516	165	1,405	1.52%	0
The Independents	DU	63	56	186	196	24	525	0.57%	0
Communist Party of Austria	KPÖ	38	19	54	80	8	199	0.22%	0
Valid Votes		18,108	11,494	25,520	34,279	2,743	92,144	100.00%	2
Rejected Votes		287	226	421	609	57	1,600	1.71%	
Total Polled		18,395	11,720	25,941	34,888	2,800	93,744	87.34%	
Registered Electors		21,558	14,097	30,174	41,509		107,338		
Turnout		85.33%	83.14%	85.97%	84.05%		87.34%		

The following candidates were elected:

- Party mandates - Erwin Kaipel (SPÖ), 6,327 votes; and Paul Kiss (ÖVP), 4,327 votes.

===== 1995 =====
Results of the 1995 legislative election held on 17 December 1995:

Party		Votes per district					Total votes	%	Seats
Party		Güs- sing	Jen- ners- dorf	Ober- pullen- dorf	Ober- wart	Voting card	Total votes	%	Seats
Social Democratic Party of Austria	SPÖ	7,429	4,546	11,783	16,064	1,157	40,979	43.88%	1
Austrian People's Party	ÖVP	6,846	3,800	9,285	10,499	819	31,249	33.46%	1
Freedom Party of Austria	FPÖ	2,965	2,492	3,660	6,096	474	15,687	16.80%	0
Liberal Forum	LiF	420	279	676	986	312	2,673	2.86%	0
The Greens – The Green Alternative	GRÜNE	307	260	529	781	291	2,168	2.32%	0
No – Civic Action Group; Against the Sale of Austria	NEIN	100	55	151	206	21	533	0.57%	0
Communist Party of Austria	KPÖ	15	13	27	44	1	100	0.11%	0
Valid Votes		18,082	11,445	26,111	34,676	3,075	93,389	100.00%	2
Rejected Votes		405	293	614	854	43	2,209	2.31%	
Total Polled		18,487	11,738	26,725	35,530	3,118	95,598	88.79%	
Registered Electors		21,608	13,976	30,573	41,513		107,670		
Turnout		85.56%	83.99%	87.41%	85.59%		88.79%		

The following candidates were elected:

- Party mandates - Erwin Kaipel (SPÖ), 4,338 votes; and Paul Kiss (ÖVP), 3,378 votes.

===== 1994 =====
Results of the 1994 legislative election held on 9 October 1994:

Party		Votes per district					Total votes	%	Seats
Party		Güs- sing	Jen- ners- dorf	Ober- pullen- dorf	Ober- wart	Voting card	Total votes	%	Seats
Social Democratic Party of Austria	SPÖ	7,386	4,629	12,032	15,940	844	40,831	43.72%	1
Austrian People's Party	ÖVP	7,050	3,992	9,122	10,648	631	31,443	33.67%	1
Freedom Party of Austria	FPÖ	2,988	2,279	3,591	5,723	389	14,970	16.03%	0
The Greens – The Green Alternative	GRÜNE	505	358	822	1,195	276	3,156	3.38%	0
Liberal Forum	LiF	422	253	606	911	225	2,417	2.59%	0
No – Civic Action Group; Against the Sale of Austria	NEIN	75	47	120	183	9	434	0.46%	0
Communist Party of Austria	KPÖ	19	9	27	20	4	79	0.08%	0
United Greens Austria – List Adi Pinter	VGÖ	5	8	18	18	0	49	0.05%	0
Citizen Greens Austria – Free Democrats	BGÖ	0	1	7	8	2	18	0.02%	0
Valid Votes		18,450	11,576	26,345	34,646	2,380	93,397	100.00%	2
Rejected Votes		349	283	578	725	18	1,953	2.05%	
Total Polled		18,799	11,859	26,923	35,371	2,398	95,350	88.07%	
Registered Electors		21,726	14,091	30,819	41,625		108,261		
Turnout		86.53%	84.16%	87.36%	84.98%		88.07%		

The following candidates were elected:

- Party mandates - Erwin Kaipel (SPÖ), 5,602 votes; and Paul Kiss (ÖVP), 5,027 votes.
