= 2000 Burgenland state election =

Austrian election

- December 3, 2000
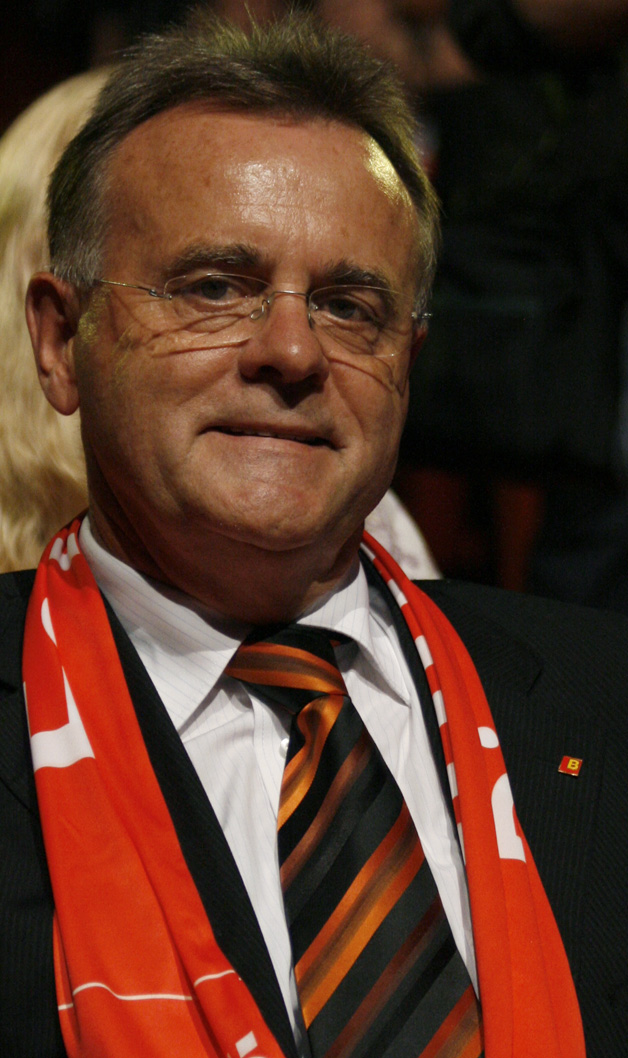
	First party	Second party	Third party
Leader	Hans Niessl	Franz Steindl
Party	SPÖ	ÖVP	FPÖ
Last election	17 seats, 44.5	14 seats, 36.1%	5 seats, 14.6%
Seats before	17	14	5
Seats after	17	13	4
Seat change	±0	▼1	▼1
Percentage	46.6%	35.3%	12.6%
Swing	▲2.1%	▼0.8%	▼2.0%
	Fourth party
Party	Greens
Last election	0 seats, 2.5%
Seats before	0
Seats after	2
Seat change	▲2
Percentage	5.5%
Swing	▲3.0%

The Burgenland state election of 2000 was held in the Austrian state of Burgenland on 3 December 2000.

The Social Democratic Party of Austria (SPÖ) won the election, with Hans Niessl returning as state governor (Landeshauptmann). He had previously taken over the office in late 2000 from Karl Stix.

Party	Votes in %	Seats	Change
Social Democratic Party of Austria (SPÖ)	46.6%	17	+0
Austrian People's Party (ÖVP)	35.3%	13	-1
Freedom Party of Austria (FPÖ)	12.6%	4	-1
The Greens – The Green Alternative (Grüne)	5.5%	2	+2
Others	0.1%	0	+0

Popular Vote
SPÖ	46.55%
ÖVP	35.33%
FPÖ	12.63%
GRÜNE	5.49%

Landtag seats
SPÖ	47.22%
ÖVP	36.11%
FPÖ	11.11%
GRÜNE	5.56%
