= Alexander Petschnig =

Austrian politician (born 1973)

Member of the National Council
- Incumbent
- Assumed office 24 October 2024

Personal details
- Born: 29 March 1973 (age 53)
- Party: Freedom Party

Alexander Petschnig (born 29 March 1973) is an Austrian politician of the Freedom Party. He was elected member of the National Council in the 2024 legislative election, and has served as leader of the Freedom Party in Burgenland since 2020.
