= Christian Sagartz =

Austrian politician (born 1981)

Christian Sagartz MEP
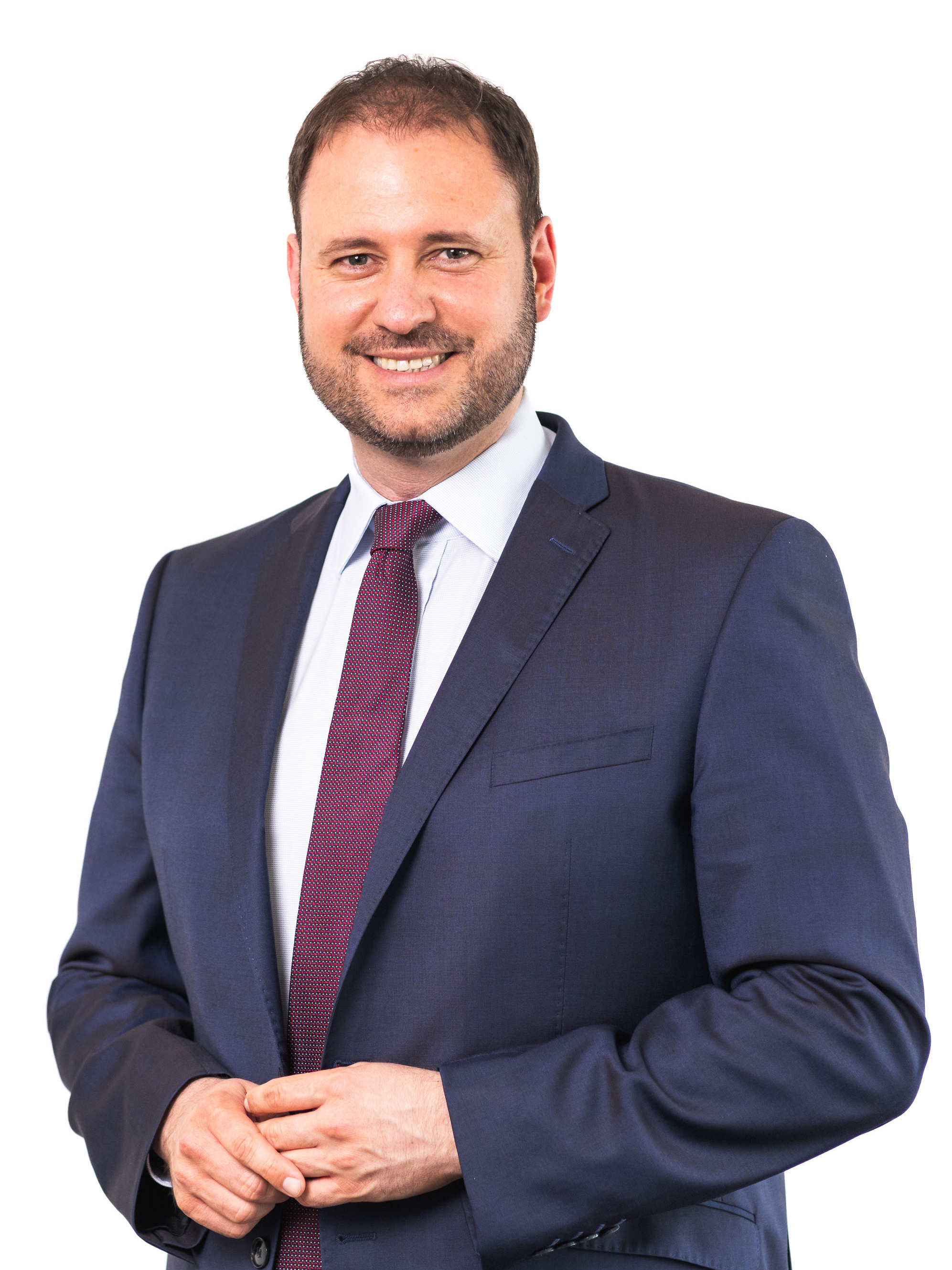

Member of the Burgenland State Parliament
- Incumbent
- Assumed office 6 February 2025

Member of the European Parliament for Austria
- In office 23 January 2020 – 15 July 2024

Member of the Burgenland State Parliament
- In office 25 October 2005 – 22 January 2020

Personal details
- Born: 16 January 1981 (age 45)
- Party: Austrian People's Party; European People's Party

Christian Sagartz (born 16 January 1981) is an Austrian politician of the Austrian People's Party (ÖVP) who has been serving as Member of the European Parliament from 2020 to 2024. He is currently a Member of the Burgenland State Parliament (Landtag).

== Early life and education ==
Sagartz attended the University of Vienna, where he earned a BA in political science (2006–2010) and a master's degree in political consultancy (2010–2012).

== Political career ==
Sagartz has served as a municipal councillor in Pöttsching since 2002 to 2022 and held the office of vice-mayor for eight years. He was the Burgenland chairman of Young People's Party from 2002 to 2008. He became a Member of the Burgenland State Parliament (Landtag) on 25 October 2005. He remained a Member of the State Parliament until he moved to the European Parliament in 2020. Since 2018, he has served as State Chairman of the Österreichischer Arbeitnehmerinnen- und Arbeitnehmerbund (Austrian Union of Employees and Workers) in the state of Burgenland. He served as state party chairman of the Austrian People's Party in Burgenland from 2020 to 2025. Since 6 February 2026, he has once again been a member of the Burgenland State Parliament.

=== Member of the European Parliament, 2020–2024 ===
Sagartz was a Member of the European Parliament from 2020 to 2024. In Parliament, he served on the Committee on Development, the Committee on Employment and Social Affairs, and the Special Committee on Beating Cancer. He was also vice-chair of the Subcommittee on Human Rights.

In addition to his committee assignments, Sagartz was a substitute member of the delegations to the EU–Albania Stabilisation and Association Parliamentary Committee, the EU–Montenegro Stabilisation and Association Parliamentary Committee, the ACP–EU Joint Parliamentary Assembly, and for relations with South Africa.

His parliamentary work focused on combating cancer, addressing illegal migration, and strengthening EU–Western Balkans relations. He was also responsible for the Parliament's annual report on North Macedonia. Sagartz served as a member of the European Parliament’s Delegation for relations with Central Asia. He led a European Parliament delegation to Kazakhstan following the Kazakhstan unrest in January 2022, engaging with political stakeholders on the ground. He also participated in delegation visits to Kyrgyzstan and Tajikistan.

In addition, he undertook several working visits to the United Nations in New York City, focusing on migration, human rights, and multilateral cooperation.

Sagartz has been particularly active in fostering European networking and cooperation with the Western Balkans. He initiated exchange programmes for young political leaders. He also organized workshops in Brussels aimed at providing practical insights into the functioning of European institutions.

A further focus of his work has been on security cooperation. Sagartz facilitated exchanges between Austrian and international emergency services, including meetings of fire brigade officers in Brussels and exchanges with delegations from North Macedonia at an international fire brigade exhibition in Oberwart.

In the field of migration and internal security, he hosted a summit titled “Combating Illegal Migration Together”, bringing together representatives of the Austrian police and armed forces as well as EU ambassadors from Albania, Montenegro and North Macedonia. He also organized business delegations to Western Balkan countries with the aim of strengthening economic ties.

In the area of health policy, he launched the initiative “Fighting Cancer Together”, within which he organized an international four-country conference to promote cooperation in cancer research and treatment.

Under the motto “Bringing Europe to the regions”, Sagartz initiated numerous visitor programmes to the European Parliament in Brussels, enabling more than 1,000 participants from Burgenland to gain first-hand insights into European policymaking.

In 2025, Christian Sagartz founded the Austrian Western Balkans Academy, a mentoring and exchange programme for young decision-makers from the Western Balkans. The initiative aims to strengthen ties with Austria, provide insights into European institutions, and foster political and economic dialogue.
