= Landtag of Burgenland =

State parliament of Burgenland, Austria

State Diet of Burgenland Burgenländischer Landtag
- 22nd Landtag of Burgenland
- Established: 1922

Leadership
- President: Robert Hergovich, SPÖ

Structure
- Seats: 36
- Political groups: Government (19): SPÖ (17); GRÜNE (2); Opposition (17): FPÖ (9); ÖVP (8)
- Length of term: 5 years

Elections
- Last election: 19 January 2025
- Next election: 2030

Meeting place
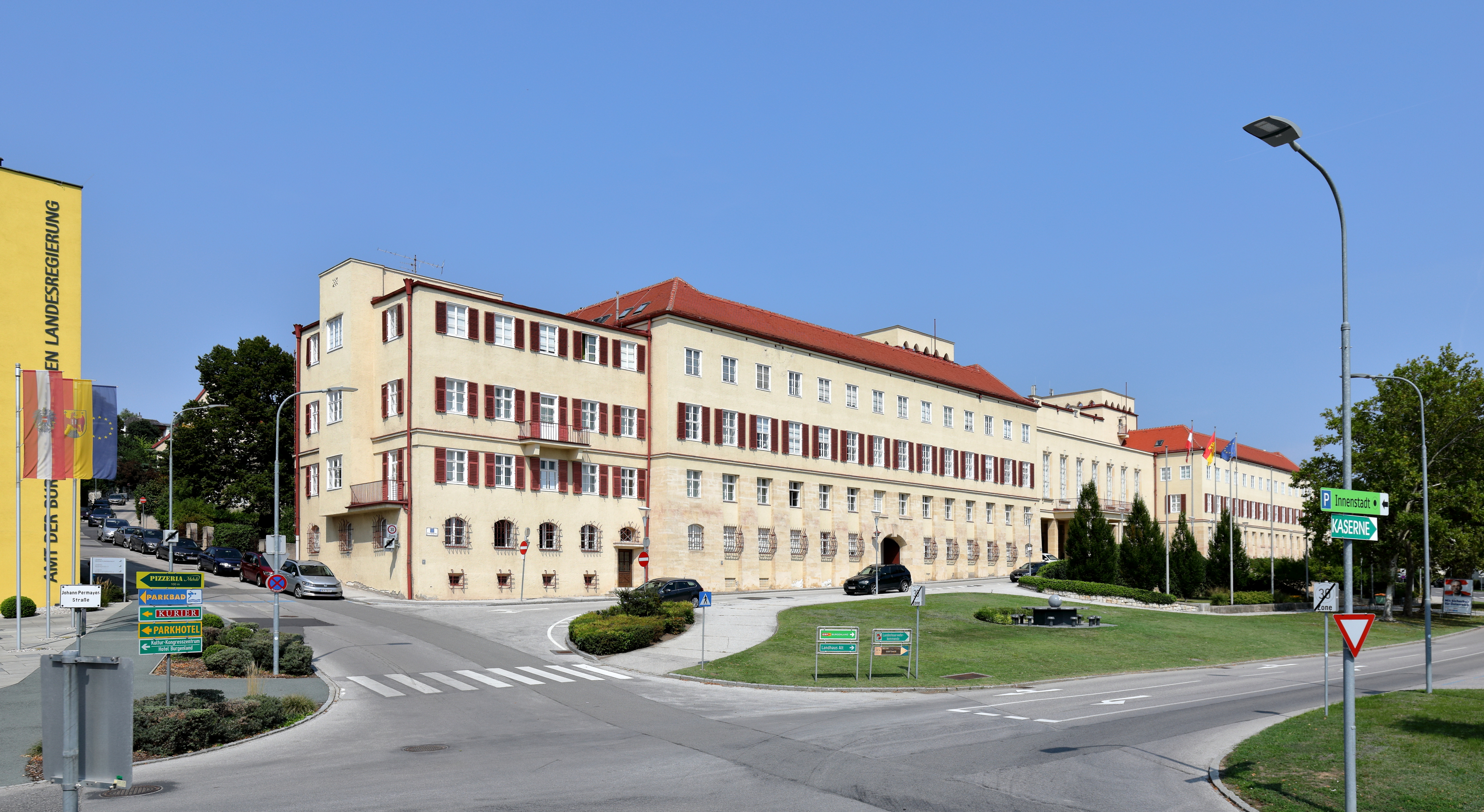

The Landtag of Burgenland is the 36-member unicameral elected parliament of Burgenland, a federal state of Austria. The most recent election happened in 2025.
