= Hans Niessl =

Austrian politician

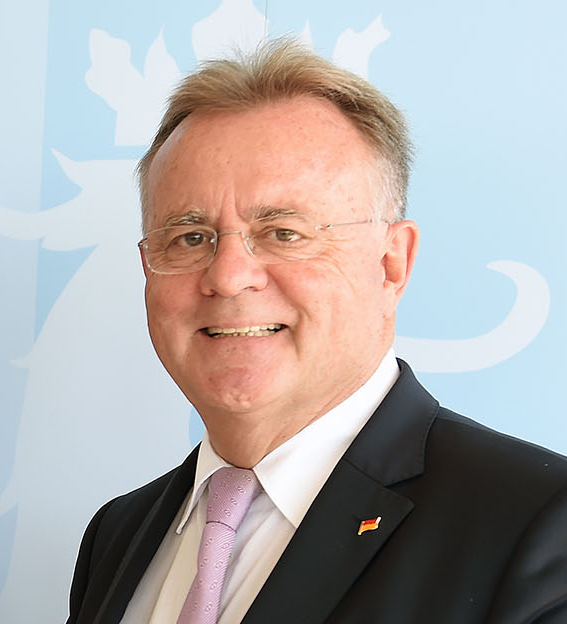

Governor of Burgenland
- In office 28 December 2000 – 28 February 2019
- Preceded by: Karl Stix
- Succeeded by: Hans Peter Doskozil

Personal details
- Born: 12 June 1951 (age 75) Zurndorf, Austria

Hans Niessl (in official documents, his surname is spelled Nießl, born 12 June 1951) is an Austrian politician, member of the Social Democratic Party of Austria and former governor of Burgenland. In 2026, he announced that he will be a candidate for President of Austria at the next election.

Niessl was born in Zurndorf. From 1987 till 2000, he was mayor of Frauenkirchen; he has been a member of the parliament of Burgenland since 1996.
