= Rust, Burgenland =

Rust
- Statutory city
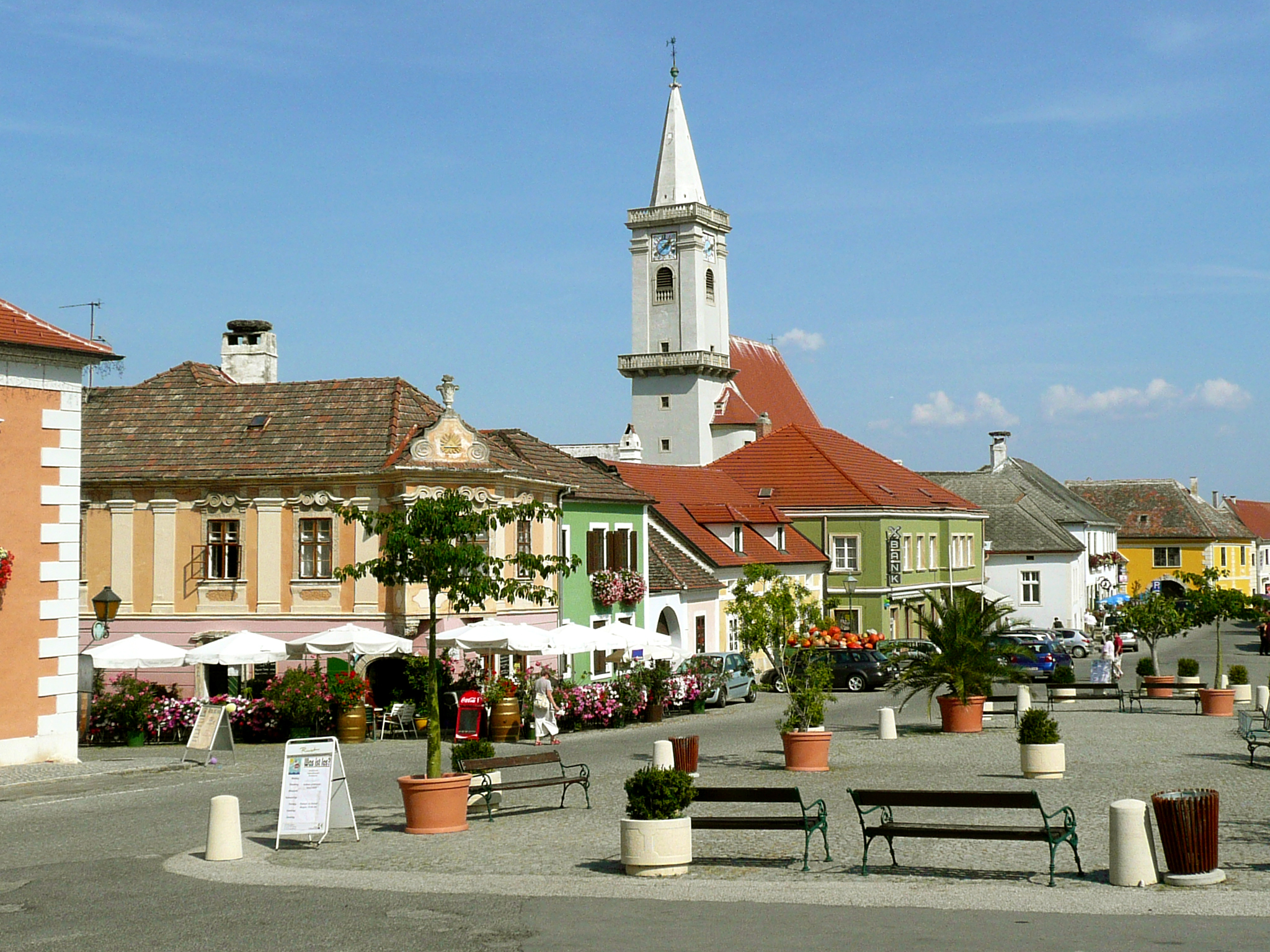
- Main square in Rust

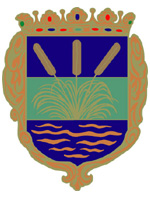
- Coat of arms

- Location within Austria Rust (Austria)
- Coordinates: 47°48′0″N 16°40′0″E
- Country: Austria
- State: Burgenland
- District: Statutory city

Government
  - Mayor: Gerold Stagl (SPÖ)

Area
  - Total: 20.01 km^{2} (7.73 sq mi)
- Elevation: 123 m (404 ft)

Population (2022-01-01)
  - Total: 1,984
  - Density: 99.15/km^{2} (256.8/sq mi)
- Time zone: UTC+1 (CET)
  - Summer (DST): UTC+2 (CEST)
- Postal code: 7071
- Area code: 02685
- Vehicle registration: E
- Website: www.freistadt-rust.at

Rust (Austrian German pronunciation: [rʊst]; Croatian: Rušta; Hungarian: Ruszt) is a city in the Austrian state of Burgenland, located on the western shore of Lake Neusiedl near the border with Hungary. With only about 1,900 inhabitants, it is the country's smallest statutory city, as it was endowed with the rights of a royal free city by the Hungarian crown in 1681. As a Statutarstadt, it also forms an administrative district (Bezirk) in its own right. The city is famous for its wines, especially for Beerenauslese, ice wine and - especially - Ruster Ausbruch.

== History ==
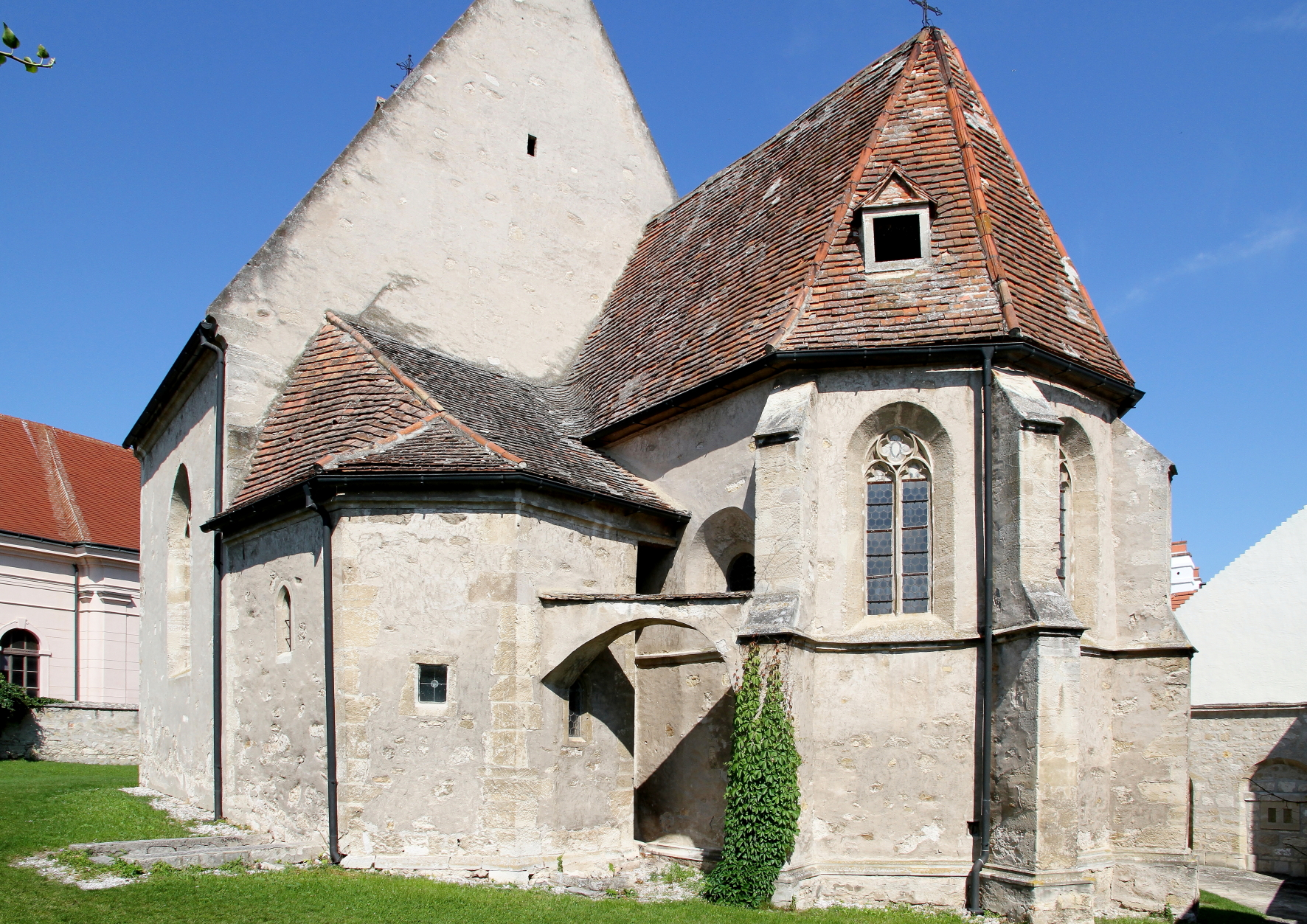
Fishermen's Church

The settlement was first mentioned as Ceel in a 1317 deed issued by King Charles I of Hungary, its name derived from Hungarian szil for Elm, later translated into German Rüster or Rusten. The present-day Hungarian name Ruszt is again a translation from the German term. Rust's citizens received market rights in 1470 and the privilege to mark the corks of their wine barrels with the famous 'R' brand in 1524. The affluent town finally gained independence at the 1681 diet at Sopron by the order of Emperor Leopold I, King of Hungary.

With the Burgenland region, Rust passed from Hungary to the Republic of Austria in 1921.

== Politics ==
Seats in the municipal assembly (Gemeinderat) as of 2007 elections:

- Social Democratic Party of Austria (SPÖ): 10
- Austrian People's Party (ÖVP): 8
- Freedom Party of Austria (FPÖ): 1

== Twin towns ==
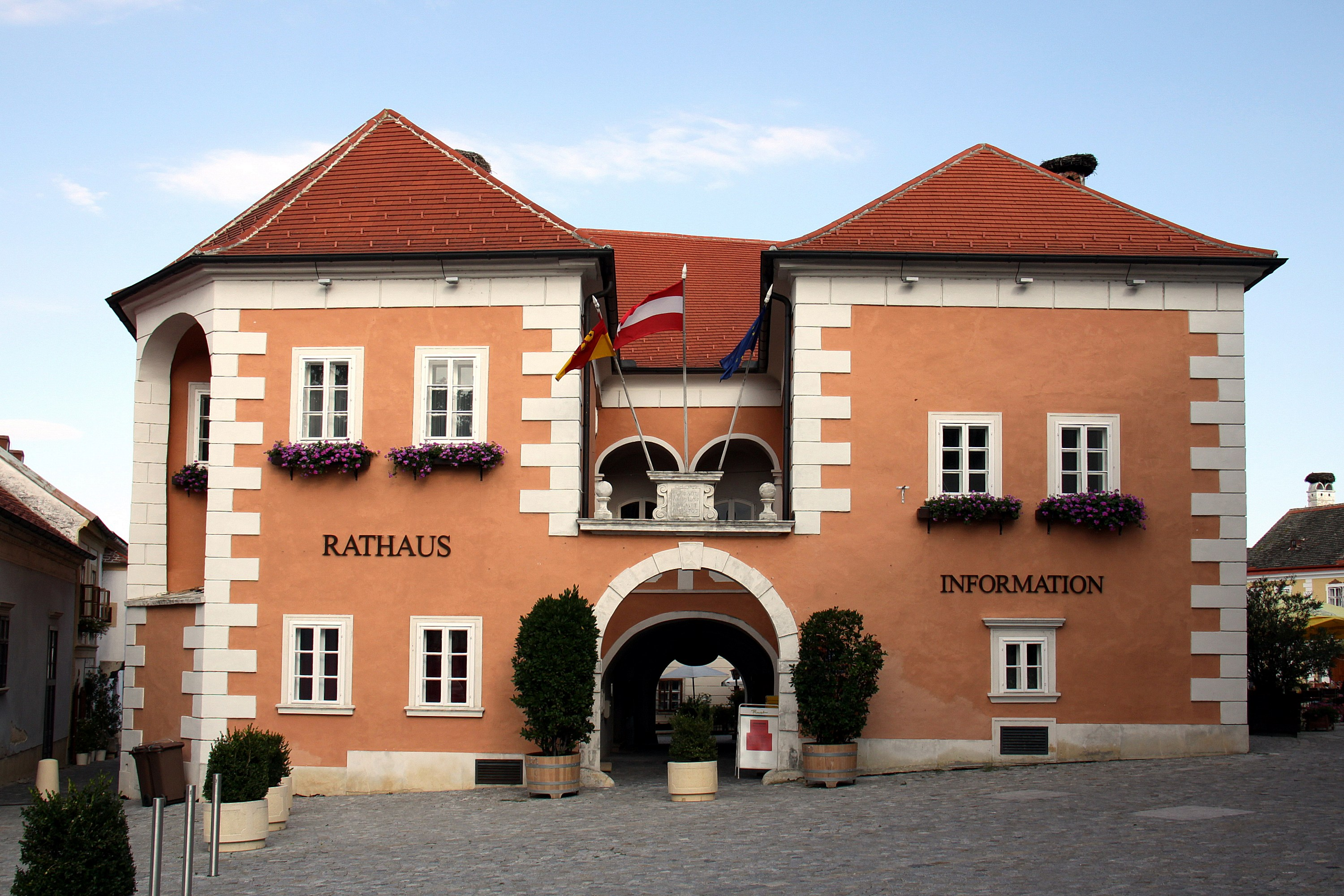
Town hall

Rust is twinned with:

- Kulmbach, Germany, since 1981.
- Tokaj, Hungary, since 2006.
