= List of governors of Burgenland =

This is a list of governors of the Austrian state of Burgenland:

== List of governors ==
No.	Portrait	Name	Term			Party	Source	Period
No.	Portrait	Name	Took office	Left office	Duration	Party	Source	Period
1		Robert Davy as Landesverwalter	10 March 1921	5 March 1922	360 days	Independent		First Republic (1921–1934)
2		Alfred Rausnitz	5 March 1922	14 July 1923	1 year, 131 days	Independent		First Republic (1921–1934)
3		Alfred Walheim	14 July 1923	4 January 1924	174 days	Greater German		First Republic (1921–1934)
4		Josef Rauhofer	4 January 1924	10 January 1928	4 years, 6 days	Christian Social		First Republic (1921–1934)
5		Anton Schreiner	10 January 1928	24 July 1929	1 year, 195 days	Christian Social		First Republic (1921–1934)
6		Johann Thullner	24 July 1929	10 December 1930	1 year, 139 days	Christian Social		First Republic (1921–1934)
(5)		Anton Schreiner	10 December 1930	25 November 1931	350 days	Christian Social		First Republic (1921–1934)
(3)		Alfred Walheim	25 November 1931	22 February 1934	2 years, 89 days	Landbund		First Republic (1921–1934)
7		Hans Sylvester	22 February 1934	11 March 1938	4 years, 17 days	Fatherland's Front		Austrofascism (1934–1938)
8		Tobias Portschy	11 March 1938	15 October 1938	218 days	NSDAP		Nazi Germany (1938–1945)
On 15 October 1938, Burgenland was dissolved and its territory divided among the Reichsgaue of Lower Danube and Styria. Portschy was appointed Gauleiter of Styria.								Nazi Germany (1938–1945)
9		Ludwig Leser	1 October 1945	4 January 1946	95 days	SPÖ		Second Republic (1945–present)
10		Lorenz Karall	4 January 1946	22 June 1956	10 years, 170 days	ÖVP		Second Republic (1945–present)
11		Johann Wagner	22 June 1956	8 August 1961	5 years, 47 days	ÖVP		Second Republic (1945–present)
12		Josef Lentsch	8 August 1961	12 June 1964	2 years, 309 days	ÖVP		Second Republic (1945–present)
13		Hans Bögl	12 June 1964	28 June 1966	2 years, 16 days	SPÖ		Second Republic (1945–present)
14		Theodor Kery	28 June 1966	30 October 1987	21 years, 124 days	SPÖ		Second Republic (1945–present)
15		Johann Sipötz	30 October 1987	18 July 1991	3 years, 261 days	SPÖ		Second Republic (1945–present)
16		Karl Stix	18 July 1991	27 December 2000	9 years, 162 days	SPÖ		Second Republic (1945–present)
17		Hans Niessl	28 December 2000	28 February 2019	18 years, 62 days	SPÖ		Second Republic (1945–present)
18		Hans Peter Doskozil	28 February 2019	Incumbent	7 years, 115 days	SPÖ		Second Republic (1945–present)
