= Gusztáv Léderer =

Executed Hungarian soldier, murderer and possible serial killer

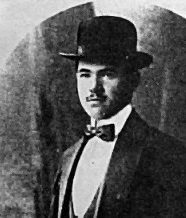
- Gusztáv Léderer in 1918
- Born: July 20, 1893; Pozsony, Austria-Hungary
- Died: November 12, 1926 (aged 33); Margit Boulevard Military Prison, Budapest, Kingdom of Hungary
- Cause of death: Execution by hanging
- Status: Executed
- Convictions: Murder; Robbery; Fraud
- Penalty: Death

Details
- Victims: 9+
- Span of crimes: 1919–1925
- Country: Hungary, possibly Czechoslovakia
- States: Budapest and elsewhere
- Date apprehended: January 10, 1925

Gusztáv Léderer (July 20, 1893 – November 12, 1926) was a Hungarian army lieutenant and member of Pál Prónay's paramilitary combat unit, and later on, a serial killer. Following the collapse of the Hungarian Soviet Republic, he performed several killings as part of the White Terror, earning a sizeable fortune for himself. Despite this, he continued killing, participating in one of the most scandalous killing of the two World Wars, and possibly others as well.

== Biography ==
=== Before the First World War ===
Gusztáv Léderer was born on July 20, 1893, into a small civic Lutheran family in Pozsony (today Bratislava, Slovakia), the son of a military officer János and his wife, Zsuzsanna (née Preisinger). Originally, Léderer planned to pursue a career as a bank clerk, but at the outbreak of World War I, he voluntarily enlisted in the army. After a year of voluntary service, he became acquainted with a young cashier of Styrian origin named Mária Schwartz. A young blonde girl of striking beauty, Schwartz was often courted by local men, but the presence of love rivals seemingly did not bother Léderer. For the next few years, he was dispatched as a food officer in the hinterland, providing fellow soldiers with food rations, and thus avoiding frontline service and active combat. After Austria-Hungary lost the war, Léderer returned home to Bratislava and married Mária.

=== Participation in the White Terror ===
After the Czechs occupied Bratislava, Gusztáv and his brother Sándor fled to the countryside, where they planned to enlist in the Hungarian Red Army. However, they soon left and went to Szeged, where Léderer joined the officer corps of Gyula Gömbös's Army Corps, again as a food officer. Soon after he joined the army, he became a notorious figure amongst his contemporaries, who claimed that he had carried out a number of political assassinations against suspected communists or people who were simply disliked in the city. In the summer of 1919, in the areas around Szeged and Tisza, corpses tangled in wires began to appear. On one occasion, when one such body was discovered along a country road near Röszke, Léderer is said to have appeared from a nearby car and angrily instructed investigators to leave the crime scene. Due to his activities in Szeged, the lieutenant was jokingly referred to as "főúsztató". When the Hungarian Soviet Republic collapsed, Léderer was part of the officer corps who crossed the front lines against the French troops occupying Szeged, striking down on those who collaborated with the communist authorities. On August 5, he took part in the Szatymaz Massacre near the village's train station, and a day later, in a similar event in Sándorfalva.

On August 18, 1920, Léderer hanged two people in Dunaföldvár, followed by another three in Kecel. In Előszállás, he hanged a man with his own waist belt, and in Bölcske, he shot a merchant and beat another man to death. He would later take part in the executions at Tahitótfalu, the Orgovány massacre and the torture and execution of prisoners abducted from the Kecskemét prison. Léderer later admitted to taking joy in torturing people.

Aside from his military duties, Léderer used his political ties to amass a personal fortune. In August 1919, he stole numerous goods, horses, pigs and other valuables worth more than 300,000 koronas from Marcali. An investigation in 1925 later revealed that Léderer had also been involved in the robbery of Batthyány Castle, from which valuable furniture and furnishings were stolen and later found in his apartment.

=== Move to Budapest ===
After the consolidation of the right-wing state, Miklós Horthy ordered than the paramilitary units operating in the Great Plains and Transdanubia to withdraw to the capital's barracks. Soon after, due to the Treaty of Trianon being signed, most of the officers serving in the army were fired from their respective posts. This included Léderer, whom luckily managed to join the gendarmerie and seve in Csepel. The lieutenant later bought a large apartment on Soroksári Street in Budapest, where he moved in with his wife. From there, he commuted to work easily, in addition to frequently visiting a nearby coffeehouse, where he spent time with his former officer buddies. However, his meager salary wasn't enough to maintain the high standard of living, and soon after, the couple found themselves in financial trouble.

=== The Kodelka Murder ===
It is unclear when the Léderer couple met Ferenc Kodelka, who ran a network of butcher shops and was considered one of Budapest's wealthiest citizens. What is certain is that Kodelka was attracted to the beauty of Mária and began courting her, which she did not refuse, as it was necessary to keep up the couple's lavish lifestyle. Eventually, the Léderers decided to cheat the butcher out of his money and then kill him. The first attempt occurred in November 1924, when Kodelka was knocked unconscious and stabbed while visiting the pair. He survived his injuries, with Léderer explaining later on that the cuts were a result from a shattered glass. The second, successful attempt took place in January 1925: under the pretext of conducting a business transaction, a large sum of money was stolen from Kodelka, who was then shot in his sleep at the apartment with Léderer's service weapon. After Léderer and his wife cleaned up the crime scene, he proceeded to dismember the body over the next few hours, stuffing the body parts in suitcases.

The couple set off to dispose of the remains on the banks of the Danube River in Csepel, but were discovered by a watchman for a nearby factory, who, to their misfortune, was familiar with them. He didn't believe the Léderer couple's explanation that they were going to throw a dead dog into the river, and he quickly notified the gendarmerie. While searching through the couple's apartment, Léderer was not at home, but several body parts belonging to the missing butcher were found in the attic. The gendarmes arrested and interrogated Mária when she returned home, and the woman immediately confessed to helping kill and dismember Kodelka. Within a few hours, Léderer was arrested as well.

=== Trial and execution ===
The murder of Ferenc Kodelka sparked a huge outrage. Fearing that this and his previous crimes would compromise the entire state, the government officials ordered a full-scale investigation into his crimes. Although a group of Budapest detectives presented viable evidence that Léderer might be connected to the murder the so-called "Wine Murder" (see below), the accused was not handed over by the military prosecutor's office to the civilian authorities, so his possible other killings were left behind and eventually went cold.

In May 1925, Gusztáv Léderer was sentenced to hang by the military tribunal for fraud, robbery and murder. His wife Mária was sentenced to life in prison. In spite of his lawyer's wishes, Léderer refused to appeal his sentence and accepted his punishment. So, instead of a pardon, his lawyer requested that he be executed by firing squad. However, as Léderer was wanted for questioning as a witness in his wife's trial, his execution was postponed until a verdict was announced. While awaiting execution, Léderer trusted that the governor would save him due to his efforts in the counter-revolutionary forces, but in complete contrast, Horthy not only did not pardon him, he also rejected his request to be executed by firing squad (this method of execution was available only for soldiers who committed crimes during service). After the governor rejected his request, Gusztáv Léderer was hanged in the courtyard of the Margit Boulevard Military Prison on November 12, 1926.

Mária was released on parole after serving 15 years in prison. She died in 1943 .

== Unproven murders ==
- While investigating the Kodelka murder, it was speculated that Léderer migh ha've committed the 1921 "Wine Murder", during which the body of a furniture factory manager, István Boros, was found in the Danube by his wife. His killer, who signed himself as "Béla Kun", had left behind a letter in the man's pocket, stating that Boros had been killed because he had recognized him. A few days after the discovery, the supposed killer sent another letter to the investigators. It would later be confirmed by the couple's housekeeper and a police officer that they knew about Boros, with the former testifying that István had visited them shortly before his death. In addition, the police officer mentioned that Boros had been seen slapping a young blonde woman shortly before his disappearance, whose husband apparently was a gendarme and lived on the same street as the Léderers.
- In addition to this, it was also suggested that the couple might have been involved in the disappearance of an elderly Viennese gentleman with whom they had been acquainted, so much so that he had been invited to their wedding in Bratislava, where he was introduced as Gusztáv's uncle. Shortly after, the man mysteriously vanished, with the Czechoslovak police only being able to locate his signature walking cane, which was presented to the Budapest authorities in the 1925 investigation.
- According to contemporary accounts, Mária Léderer had had a child from a previous liaison, but no trace of it was found after she had married Gusztáv.

== In modern culture ==
The developments in the Kodelka case were accompanied by great interest in the press, with author Gyula Krúdy taking a particular interest in it. A rhyme from that era also kept the case in the public mind: "Lady, what's in the basket?" Kodelka's hands, head, legs...!"

The figure of an aggressive right-wing soldier who harassed and then committed atrocious acts was ideal for those who wanted to portray the Horthy government in a bad light. During the rule of the Hungarian People's Republic, Léderer became a well-known and recurring figure in folklore and articles commemorating the White Terror. A book titled The Famous Crimes of the Century (A század nevezetes bűnügyei), published in 1966, devoted a whole chapter to the Léderers, and the lieutenant's likeness appears in a 1968 drama by László Kálmán. In 2009, Éva Jankovics documented the Kodelka murder, and in 2018, film director János Szász's film A hentes, a kurva és a félszemű was released, which is based upon the Léderers and the Kodelka murder.

== See also ==
- List of serial killers by country
