= Iván Héjjas =

Hungarian counter-revolutionary and commander

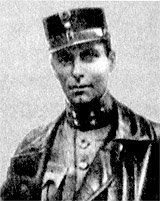
- Iván Héjjas around 1918
- Born: 19 January 1890; Kecskemét, Austria-Hungary
- Died: December 1950 (aged 60); Vigo, Spain
- Burial place: Valhalla Memorial Park Cemetery, North Hollywood, Los Angeles, U.S.
- Military career
- Allegiance: (Principality of Albania) Albania; Austria-Hungary; Hungary; Lajtabánság
- Service years: 1916–1925
- Rank: First Lieutenant
- Nickname: "Padre Esteban"
- Unit: First Army of the Rongyos Gárda
- Conflicts: Balkan Wars; Peasant Revolt in Albania; World War I White Terror; 1919–1921 Counter-revolution; Invasion of Carpatho-Ukraine

Iván Héjjas (19 January 1890 – December 1950) was a Hungarian anti-communist soldier and paramilitary commander in the years following the First World War. He played an eminent role in the anti-communist and antisemitic purges and massacres during the White Terror in the period between 1919 and 1921. As a member of various far-right groups and parties, he was a member of parliament from 1927 to 1931.

== Early life (1890–1918) ==
Iván Héjjas was born into a wealthy peasant family with Transylvanian roots in Kecskemét on 19 January 1890, as a son of Mihály Héjjas (1860–1928) and Teréz Battlay (1866–1950). Iván had five brothers (Mihály Jr., Aurél, Tibor, Endre and Elek) and three sisters. Iván finished his secondary studies at the Higher Commercial School of Arad in 1909. Due to the influence of his godfather, he got a job as a bank clerk at the local branch of the People's Bank (Hungarian: Népbank). He worked as an assistant accountant at the Nagykőrös Economic Bank Ltd. in 1910. He was employed in the same position by the Kecskemét Commercial and Industrial Credit Institute in 1913.

The left-wing emigrant newspaper Bécsi Magyar Újság claimed in a 1921 article that Héjjas, according to an alleged police file, committed embezzlement against his mistress, a much older Jewish woman in 1911. According to the article, she died under suspicious circumstances soon afterwards. To avoid being charged with embezzlement, Héjjas fled to the Balkan Peninsula and fought in the Balkan Wars. Just prior to the First World War, Héjjas entered the service of Wilhelm, Prince of Albania in 1914, becoming his adviser. During his stay in Albania, Héjjas became familiar with the guerrilla warfare during the peasant revolt. Historian Balázs Kántás considered he was involved in the attempts of Austria-Hungary and the German Empire to colonize the Balkans. Héjjas reached the rank of major within the Albanian army.

Héjjas left Albania and returned to Austria-Hungary in 1916 to join the Austro-Hungarian Armed Forces as a volunteer with dozens of Bosnian and Albanian militiamen. He was enlisted to the Imperial and Royal 68th Infantry Regiment. He was promoted to the rank of reserve first lieutenant in November 1916. By the end of the First World War, he was a fighter pilot at the Austro-Hungarian Aviation Troops.

== Paramilitary leader (1918–1925) ==
=== First steps ===
Even before the defeat in the war, Héjjas returned to his birthplace Kecskemét. In November 1918, he was a member of a military delegation, which offered their service to the newly installed Mihály Károlyi government after the Aster Revolution. Héjjas and his companions proposed to establish national guards along the eastern and southern borders of the disintegrating Kingdom of Hungary, but the Károlyi government pursued a pacifist policy on the basis of the Fourteen Points. Héjjas quickly became disillusioned with the new system. Under his leadership, 350 reserve officers gathered in Kecskemét on 19 November 1918, to demand the government to pay their substantial cash allowance and integrate them to the labor market. Héjjas and his soldiers also supported the division of large estates.

Following the formation of the Hungarian Soviet Republic in the spring of 1919, Héjjas began to organize his detachment – its core consisted of former members of the Aviation Troops – in his family's estate in the countryside near Kecskemét to overthrow the Communist government led by Béla Kun. The detachment later was known as Brigade of the Hungarian Plain (or Alföld Brigade, Hungarian: Alföldi Brigád). In the presence of approximately 300 men, Héjjas issued the so-called Kecskemét Manifesto, an important document of the Hungarian radical right-wing ideology in the interwar period. Héjjas rejected the Soviet Republic and the former pacifist policy too, intended to protect the "thousand-year borders" against the neighboring countries and demanded the division of large estates in favor of the WW1 veterans. Beside that, Héjjas also became one of the founders of the proto-fascist Association of Awakening Hungarians (ÉME). Alongside Pál Prónay, Gyula Gömbös, Gyula Ostenburg-Moravek and Károly Csörgey, Héjjas was also a member (and, allegedly, deputy commander) of the quasi-state secret service Double-Cross Blood Alliance (KKVSz). Héjjas' first rebellion broke out against the Soviet Republic in late April 1919. The insurgents planned to take over the military base located on the outskirts of Kecskemét, occupy the weapons warehouse in Orgovány, and then remove the Communists in the local government from power. The local authorities arrested 81 members of Héjjas' group (including Tibor, brother of Iván) on 22 April 1919. Subsequently, a brief skirmish took place between the insurgents and the local branch of the Red Guard. The rebellion was quickly suppressed, many leaders fled and hid in the surrounding farmsteads, including Iván Héjjas, Mihály Francia Kiss and Béla Liszka. The advancing Red Guard plausibly ransacked and looted Héjjas' farmstead, torturing his father and some of his siblings.

=== Role in the White Terror ===
Héjjas subsequently moved to Szeged, centre of counter-revolutionary activity. There, he negotiated with Károly Soós, chief of staff of Miklós Horthy, the Commander of the National Army. Soós, on behalf of Horthy, ordered him to "make order" in and around Kecskemét. Héjjas returned to his birthplace in July 1919, where he acted as a local military representative of the counter-revolutionary government. There, he organized a national guard with the consent of the Romanian Army's general staff, after the Romanians began to occupy the southern part of the Great Hungarian Plain. Becoming the de facto military governor of Kecskemét and the Danube–Tisza Interfluve, Héjjas ordered the internment and execution of those who allegedly collaborated with the former Communist regime. Héjjas and his militia received significant logistical and material support from the Romanian army in the following months. In October–November 1919, the Héjjas detachment murdered approximately 100 persons (including six police officers), moreover looting of their properties, whose participation in the Red Terror was not proven at all, according to an investigation conducted by Győző Drozdy, a member of parliament. In late 1919, the police chief of Kecskemét forwarded a document to government commissioner Gedeon Ráday, according to which Héjjas' paramilitary organization was responsible for the death or disappearance of 50 people in the area. Héjjas and his militia (including Mihály Francia Kiss) usually transferred the abducted persons from the prison of Kecskemét to the forest of Orgovány, where they were tortured and executed. Historian Béla Bodó calculated the number of the victims to 300 in the period between late September and early December 1919 in the region Danube–Tisza Interfluve.

About a third of the victims were Jewish. Beside anti-communism and antisemitism, Héjjas and his men were motivated by a mixture of material gain, desire for revenge and religious hatred. The detachment usually organized antisemitic pogroms in the region, the most notorious is the one in Izsák on 17 November 1919, where hundreds of Jews were physically assaulted, robbed and forcibly displaced. Bodó argued the main motivation was pure common law robbery. Houses of wealthy Jews were looted in Kecskemét during the months. In late December 1919, Héjjas drove a Fiat, confiscating it from a Jewish entrepreneur, while he gifted another automobile to his father from the prey in early 1920. Héjjas paid his men by allowing free robberies. For the intercession of Pál Prónay, his father, Mihály Héjjas was contracted as the main wine supplier for the National Army in 1920. According to a female witness, Iván Héjjas considered himself a soldier, who "carried out Horthy's orders, thus his conscience is clear". He added, "today, they might still think of us as just murderers. However, history will prove that we are heroes". Héjjas was surrounded by a cult of personality within his brigade. After the Romanian army – which prevented Iván Héjjas and his militia from committing crimes in several cases – withdrew from the areas east of river Tisza in April 1920, the Alföld Brigade extended its area of operation to the liberated areas as well. Bodó argued Héjjas and his men murdered 400 people between December 1920 and December 1921.

Héjjas' paramilitary career was patronized by Pál Prónay, the most infamous commander during the White Terror. Héjjas and his 17 men were admitted to the Rongyos Gárda in November 1919. Around the same time, dozens of bodies were dug up in the forest of Orgovány. Justice minister István Bárczy ordered a preliminary investigation of the crimes within the National Army, but Miklós Horthy and the military command refused his request. Soon, Héjjas and his closest companions left Kecskemét for the Ferdinand military base in Budapest. In early 1920, Héjjas chose a new headquarter for his brigade, the Britannia Hotel on the Grand Boulevard. Iván and Aurél Héjjas had important role in recruiting 2,000 men to the Rongyos Gárda at the turn of 1919 and 1920. According to Drozdy, the Héjjas brothers threatened the left-wing journalist Béla Somogyi not to write any more articles about the crimes of right-wing paramilitary groups in countryside, shortly before Somogyi's murder committed by then detachment of Gyula Ostenburg-Moravek.

The rise of Héjjas and the actions of his men worried the conservative political and military elite more and more, after Horthy was elected as Regent of Hungary and Hungary sought to stabilize its international relations in March 1920. Agricultural minister Gyula Rubinek initiated the dissolution of the ÉME in April 1920. In May, the government leaked Héjjas' police file (see above), and partly the socialist Népszava and partly the bourgeois radical Világ aired the affairs of Héjjas and his men. In response, Héjjas published an article in the columns of the Magyar Kurír in June, in which he threatened the government and the parliament on behalf of ÉME. In the same month, the government ordered the disbandment of the Alföld Brigade. Under his signature, several anti-government and antisemitic pamphlets were scattered throughout the capital. Since his range of motion gradually narrowed in the Danube–Tisza Interfluve, Héjjas and several of his soldiers moved to Western Transdanubia to join Prónay's efforts to hinder the incorporation of those territories (later known as Burgenland) to the First Austrian Republic, which Hungary had lost in accordance with the Treaty of Trianon. In July 1920, the Héjjas detachment attacked and looted an arsenal near Fürstenfeld (Fölöstöm). The acquired weapons were distributed among the men of Prónay and Héjjas in Hungary. According to a police report, 2–3,000 people were under Héjjas' command in Budapest. Héjjas and his men took part in the uprising in West Hungary, which led to the establishment of the short-lived breakaway state Lajtabánság in the autumn of 1921. Political differences soon drove a wedge between Prónay and Héjjas. The latter was young and ambitious military officer who was not determined to dedicate his life and career to the isolating Prónay – who aimed to overthrow the Hungarian government – and his crude idea of an independent Burgenland. In contrast to Prónay, Héjjas did not support Charles IV of Hungary's attempts to retake the throne. Consequently, he refused to join the legitimist (royalist) forces against the Horthy regime despite the negotiations with Count Antal Sigray. In late October 1921, Héjjas's detachment occupied Sopron. After Charles IV recruited an army, Héjjas and his soldiers fled Western Hungary and swore allegiance to Regent Miklós Horthy.

=== Disbandment of militias ===
Under social pressure, the Hungarian government entrusted Deputy Crown Prosecutor Albert Váry to investigate the crimes committed by nationalist paramilitary units during the White Terror. A government decree drafted by Váry in June 1920 stated that all military detachments were to cease all atrocities against civilians immediately. Although Váry was soon dismissed from his position due to the right-wing parties' distrust, the newly appointed Prime Minister István Bethlen was committed to the liquidation of paramilitary units and their integration into the regular army. In November 1920, the Héjjas militia killed a police officer József Soltra during a firefight in Oktogon in Budapest. Subsequently, the police raided several hotels in the capital, capturing dozens of Héjjas' men. Another members of his unit murdered Adolf Léderer, a Jewish resident of Solt in August 1921. Bethlen commissioned Váry to investigate the crime, in addition to the atrocities in the region Danube–Tisza Interfluve since the fall of the Hungarian Soviet Republic. Váry conducted an on-site investigation lasted from August 1921 to June 1922. In his report, Váry stated the alleged communist sympathies and/or Jewish ancestry of the victims, for instance in the case of Adolf Léderer and three residents of Izsák – Zoltán Pánczél, Sándor Beck and Árpád Schmiedt – was merely a pretense to get their property, and these were ordinary robbery-murders. Horthy's amnesty decree from November 1921 – because of Héjjas' role in the prevention of King Charles' return – and the passivity of a military tribunal made it completely impossible to prosecute the members of the Héjjas detachment. Regarding the murders in Izsák, Héjjas was questioned only as a witness during a trial in June 1922, despite the fact that two perpetrators – János Zbona and Mihály Danics – claimed that the three men were killed on his orders. In a published statement, Héjjas justified his actions and those of his squad on moral grounds and denied the need for an amnesty to protect him. In the summer of 1922, he recruited soldiers to launch a second uprising in Western Hungary, for which he was briefly detained.

His role in Western Hungary and his pro-Horthy standpoint during the king's attempt to retake his throne saved Héjjas' paramilitary and political career, while Prónay and Gyula Ostenburg-Moravek were marginalized. Héjjas found a new patron in the person of Gyula Gömbös, leader of the Hungarian National Defence Association (MOVE). Meanwhile, István Bethlen re-structured the organization of ÉME, pushing Héjjas and his supporters into the background in the second half of 1922. Héjjas joined the far-right Hungarian National Independence Party, led by Gömbös, in 1923. His person, among others, was linked to numerous bombings in the 1920s, for instance regarding a grenade attack against a liberal political club in Erzsébetváros in April 1922, where eight people were killed, a failed attack against the French embassy in the autumn of 1923, and bombing at a charity event of the Jewish Women's Association in Csongrád in December 1923, where three people were killed. On Bethlen's instructions, the police, among others, interrogated Héjjas regarding the bombing and the existence of secret societies. The patronage of Horthy and Gömbös, however, protected Héjjas from prosecution. The final disbandment of the right-wing militias took place in 1924–1925. The Alföld Brigade, the ÉME and others were integrated under the supervision of the ministry-controlled Office of National Labour Protection, but the social network connections remained within the movements and lived on in the various departments of the Ministry of the Interior.

== Political career (1925–1944) ==
As a politician of the Hungarian National Defence Association, Héjjas was elected a Member of the House of Representatives for Kunszentmiklós constituency in the 1926 parliamentary election. Only Gömbös and Héjjas obtained mandates from their party. Local intellectuals protested against Héjjas' mandate because of his paramilitary past. Newspapers reported abuses and government backlash surrounding his election. Gömbös decided to disband his party and re-joined the governing Unity Party in 1928, thus Héjjas also became an MP of the ruling party thereafter. As a member of the Hungarian delegation, Héjjas participated in the unveiling of the statue of Lajos Kossuth in New York City in March 1928. Protests took place against the delegation by the local Hungarian community. Héjjas, along with e.g. Gömbös and his brother Aurél, were inducted to the Order of Vitéz in June 1929.

Héjjas remained MP until the 1931 parliamentary election. He took on board membership in his family's wine producers and agricultural companies in the 1930s. He was employed as a government official by the Ministry of Trade and Transport since 1932. He was promoted to retired Captain sometime in the 1930s. Following the death of Prime Minister Gyula Gömbös in 1936, Héjjas lost his political patron, thus his career could no longer advance in a political sense. He founded an extra-parliamentary far-right party National Association of Hungarian Racial Defenders in 1938. The party received only 1,288 votes in the 1939 parliamentary election. Héjjas and the Rongyos Gárda took part in the Hungarian invasion of Carpatho-Ukraine in March 1939. He was appointed head of aviation affairs department within the ministry in 1940. Beside that, he was also a board member of the state-owned Malert (Magyar Légiforgalmi Rt.). Héjjas played a role in the development of the Hungarian Air Force. He was involved in the so-called Malert v. Ministry of Trade. A memorandum issued by leaders of the company discussed Héjjas' political ineptitude and the general poor technical condition of the aircraft. According to the memoir of Mátyás Pirity, Héjjas threatened the terminated pilots with a statutory court in view of the Second World War.

Despite being a far-right politician, Héjjas kept himself away the Arrow Cross Party and the other pro-Nazi parties and remained a supporter of Miklós Horthy and the conservative elite. He campaigned for the election of István Horthy as Deputy Regent in early 1942. Héjjas rebranded his minor party as the National Defense Association in 1942. His party had close ties with the various intelligence agencies, connecting to the propaganda activities of the Horthy regime. He was granted the state award Cross of National Defense in the same year. During the end phase of the WW2, Horthy appointed Héjjas to supervise the organization of an irregular paramilitary unit of 5,000 people in the summer of 1943, which they intended to deploy against the Wehrmacht after a successful withdrawal from the Axis powers. Héjjas' militia did not take part in the military defense of the country, and it was disbanded in the fall of 1944.

== Later life (1944–1950) ==
Héjjas retired from the ministry with the title of honorary state secretary in February 1944. He returned to Kecskemét after the Operation Margarethe, when the Third Reich occupied Hungary in March 1944. At the end of 1944, he became the commander of the labour services in Nagykőrös and Kecskemét. Before the advancing Soviet Army, Héjjas fled from Hungary dressed as a Spanish Franciscan friar called Father Esteban and moved to Graz, Austria (then part of Nazi Germany) in late 1944 or early 1945. After the war, he settled down in Vigo in Francoist Spain. His wife lived and worked in Paris, while other members of the Héjjas family (including his elderly mother) remained in Austria. His brother Jenő moved to the United States.

In his absence, the People's Court of Hungary sentenced him to death in August 1949 for his eminent role in the 1919–1921 White Terror (primarily the mass murders at the forest of Orgovány). After complications from stomach surgery, Iván Héjjas died of long lasting peptic ulcer or stomach cancer in December 1950 in Vigo, Spain. His ashes were transferred to the United States by his relatives in 1971, where he was buried in the Valhalla Memorial Park Cemetery in North Hollywood, Los Angeles under the pseudonym Padre Esteban.

== Personal life ==
Iván Héjjas married Sarolta Papp, a daughter of György Papp, the former police chief of Kecskemét. They were engaged since 1920, but their marriage took place only in November 1938, after, according to his old oath, Héjjas intended to marry only after the first annexed territory since the Treaty of Trianon (i.e. Carpathian Ruthenia under the First Vienna Award) had returned to Hungary. In the second half of 1920, he had extra-marital affair with actress Ilona Rulf.

Héjjas obtained a doctorate of law, after defending his academic thesis on aviation law at the Faculty of Economics of the Royal Hungarian Pázmány Péter University (present-day Eötvös Loránd University) in 1933. He received the title of private university teacher there in 1934. He was a board member of the Association of Hungarian Vineyards and Mountain Communities. He was granted the Officer of the Order of the Crown of Italy in April 1943.

== Sources ==
- Bodó, Béla (2010). "Héjjas Iván. Egy ellenforradalmár élete [Iván Héjjas. The Life of a Counter-Revolutionary]". 2000 (in Hungarian). 22 (10). Mentor Irodalmi Alapítvány: 9–27. ISSN 0864-800X.
- Bodó, Béla (2019). The White Terror. Antisemitic and Political Violence in Hungary, 1919–1921. Routledge. ISBN 978-1138579521.
- Domonkos, László (2018). A Héjjas-nyárfa árnyékában [In the Shade of the Héjjas' Aspen] (in Hungarian). Kairosz Kiadó. ISBN 978-963-662-937-3.
- Kántás, Balázs (2022). Héjjas Iván. Vázlat egy magyar radikális jobboldali katonatiszt-politikus életrajzához és kapcsolatrendszeréhez [A Draft on Iván Héjjas [1890–1950], a Radical Right-Wing Hungarian Military Officer and Politician of the 20th Century and His Controversial Career] (in Hungarian). Hungarovox Kiadó. ISBN 978-963-534-139-9.
- Romsics, Ignác (1982). A Duna-Tisza köze hatalmi-politikai viszonyai 1918–19-ben [Power-Political Relations in the Danube–Tisza Interfluve in 1918–1919] (in Hungarian). Akadémiai Kiadó. ISBN 963-05-2769-3.
