= Győző Drozdy =

Hungarian politician (1885–1970)

- Born: 1 October 1885; Bajta, Kingdom of Hungary (today: Bajtava, Slovakia)
- Died: 2 November 1970 (aged 85); Budapest, Hungary

Győző Drozdy (English: Victor Drozdy, Bajtava, October 1, 1885 – Budapest, November 2, 1970) was a Hungarian teacher, journalist, and politician.

== Family and early life ==
His father was Gyula Drozdy the community's Roman Catholic cantor-teacher, father of five children. He attended grade school in Esztergom, later he continued his studies by completing the training school after which he studied special needs education in Budapest. Between 1907 and 1919 he worked as a teacher. During this period he started journalism, his first column being published in Ottokár Prohászka’s newspaper titled 'Esztergom'.

He entered into compulsory military service at the outbreak of the World War I. After returning from the front in 1917 he became the managing editor of the ‘Budai Újság (Newspaper of Buda)’. He started his political career in 1918 as the secretary of the Independence and 48 Party. He was also a journalist for Mihály Károlyi’s newspaper ‘Magyarország (Hungary)’ while also publishing in the ‘Alkotmány (Constitution)’.

In 1918 during the Aster Revolution he was part of the negotiations revolving around the head of state with King-Emperor Charles IV, and came to be scrivener of the Hungarian National Council.

== Political career ==
After the military collapse in World War I the surrounding countries invaded the historical lands of the Hungarian state. Drozdy returned to his home county in Upper Hungary where he organized the local populace into a militia and fought the advancing Czech troops. Meanwhile, in January 1919 he became the secretary general of the National Smallholders and Agrarian Workers Party led by István Szabó de Nagyatád.

On the elections in January 1920 for the Hungarian National Diet he was running in the county of Zala, as a candidate for the National Smallholders and Agrarian Workers Party. But before the second round the gendarmerie seized him, accusing him of collaborating with the communists and for his subversive actions in the Hungarian Soviet Republic era. Nevertheless, Drozdy won the elections with great majority. In one of his first speech's he strongly confronted the White Terror. He was one of the nine members of parliament who voted against making Miklós Horthy regent. He also spoke up against the Numerus clausus law.

The parliament shortly after revoked his membership. On the elections that followed he nominated himself yet again and won decisively. He became one of the lead speakers for the opposition. In one of his significant speeches in parliament he rises up against the government's lack of action in pursuing the murderers and culprits of the White Terror, in particular mass murders committed by Iván Héjjas and his counter-revolutionary task-force.

On the next elections in 1922, István Bethlen the Prime Minister personally precepts the Ministry of Internal Affairs to sabotage his election, but regardless Drozdy gains a mandate. The government's intervention finally brings him down on the elections of 1926.

== Immigration ==
On April 4, 1927 he and his entire family flee the country, due to political persecution, and seek asylum in the United States of America, and settle down in Chicago. He continues to be politically active and works in the American League for Revision of the Trianon Peace Treaty of Hungary as the executive vice president. At first he is lead journalist for ‘Szabadság (Liberty)’, and later founds his own newspaper ‘Az Írás (Scripture)’, where he works as the editor-in-chief.

== Return to Hungary ==
He returned to Hungary in 1932 and becomes the editor-in-chief of the newspaper ‘Magyar Falu (Hungarian Village)’. He runs on the 1935 elections as an unofficial candidate (against the favored official one) of the Hungarian Unity Party led by Gyula Gömbös, and wins.

He bolts from the Unity Party in November 1938 with those members, who oppose the appointment of Béla Imrédy to be Prime Minister and the ruling parties’ far right legislation. Drozdy becomes a member of the committee who is tasked with presenting the “Second Anti-Jewish Law” and he opposed submittal and suggests several amendments. One of these which passes legislation is the exemption of descendants of fallen I. World War Jewish soldiers, or “war orphans”.

On the 1939 elections he tried to runs as a candidate of the Independent Smallholders and Agrarian Workers Party in Zala county, but does not gain a seat, due to the administrative hurdles set before him.

From September 1, 1939 to January 1944 he works as the CEO of the ‘Esti Kurír (Evening Courier)’ which was renown for its liberal, anti-German, pro-Anglo-Saxon and pro-Jewish politics.

On March 19, 1944, since he is high ranked on the wanted list occupying Nazi troops he escapes capture by the requesting front duty. During his military service he speaks up against the war and tries to convince the officer corps of ending the war. For his activity he is brought to military court, but escapes. He organizes an armed resistance against the Nazis and on October 15, 1944 after the Coup d’état of the Arrow Cross Party he is joined by Endre Bajcsy-Zsilinszky. The two politicians hide together in the western part of the Cserhát hills and create their partisan company in the forest near Naszály. Due to the capture of Endre Bajcsy-Zsilinszky and the increased presence of Nazi troops they have limited success. Drozdy returns to Budapest just before the encirclement is complete in the siege of Budapest. He returns to politics immediately after the siege and starts reorganizing the Independent Smallholders and Agrarian Workers Party, and yet again gains a seat in parliament.

== After World War II ==
In the National Assembly Drozdy belongs to the right wing of the Smallholders Party, which meant that he strongly opposed the initiatives of the Hungarian Communist Party. In his speech in July 1946 he voices warnings and strong opposition of the Communistic One-party state. No wonder that he is the first victim of the Salami tactics of the Hungarian Communist Party, and is among the first politicians forced out of his own party on March 10. 1946.

After the estoppel the expelled party members found a new party called the Hungarian Freedom Party. Dezső Sulyok presents the party's program on July 24, 1946. The cornerstone of the program is maintaining neutrality of the country (and independence), and ensuring the democratic rights and principles of parties. There is increased friction between the Freedom Party and Smallholders Party as the latter is increasingly becoming controlled by the Communist Party.

The Hungarian Freedom party becomes the most diligent opponent, trying to shed light on the antidemocratic actions of the Communist Party. Mátyás Rákosi instructs Mihály Farkas to start a conflict of interest procedure in the autumn of 1946, targeting to remove him from parliament. The proceedings fail at their attempt as Drozdy presents hard evidence including the testimony of Endre Bajcsy-Zsilinszky's widow and other documents of his anti-fascist and anti-German actions and the absurdity of the case.

Due to constant pressure from the Communist Party the Hungarian Freedom party declares its dissolution on July 22, 1947. Many of its members including Dezső Sulyok flee the country and immigrate. When Drozdy finally gives in to the motion he is too late and he is arrested on the Jugoslav border and is taken to Andrássy út 60 by the State Protection Authority. He escapes by getting a message to his contacts by slipping a message to the doctor who is called in to prevent him from dying in his suicide attempt, before signing false documents.

His properties and assets are seized and nationalized, he is forced to work as a semi-skilled worker, from painting and by-work. He is asked to play a political part in the 1956 revolution, but turns it down due to his old age and for the sake his young boy's safety. He dies in 1970.

== Works ==
- Amerika (útleírás), Bp. 1924.
- Az ezüstkócsag (színmű), Bp. 1934.
- Aurora borealis. Államregény, de nem utópia (regény), Bp. 1937.
- A demokrácia Politikai tanulmány, Bp. 1946.
