= Vera Renczi =

Romanian serial killer (1903–1960)

- Born: 1903; Bucharest, Romania
- Died: 1939 (aged 35–36); Zrenjanin, Yugoslavia (now Serbia)
- Other name: The Black Widow
- Citizenship: Romanian
- Occupation: Housewife
- Spouse: Karl Schick
- Criminal charge: Murder
- Penalty: Life imprisonment

Details
- Victims: Lovers/husbands
- Span of crimes: 1920–1930
- Country: Romania; Yugoslavia; Hungary (alleged)
- Killed: 35
- Weapon: Arsenic

Vera Renczi (dubbed the Black Widow, Ms. Poison or Chatelaine of Berkerekul), was a Romanian serial killer who was charged with poisoning 35 individuals including her two husbands, multiple lovers, and her son with arsenic during the 1920s.

Journalist Otto Tolischus published the earliest known related article in the United States in May 1925 based on letters from the readers without naming any reference. Renczi's story has surfaced repeatedly, but without traceable details such as specific dates of her birth, marriages, arrest, conviction, incarceration or death.

Most sources place the murders at Berkerekul, Yugoslavia (present-day Serbia), or Bečkerek, which was renamed Zrenjanin in 1946; however, the spelling "Berkerekul" is unknown for this city. In 1972, the Guinness Book of World Records found no authoritative sources to support the claim that 35 people were killed by Renczi in early 20th-century Austro-Hungarian Empire.

== Early life ==
According to some accounts, Renczi was born in Bucharest in 1903, but in view of the dates of her alleged crimes, a date in the late 19th century would be more appropriate. The accounts of her life are lacking in verifiable documentary supporting evidence. Her mother died when she was 13 and she moved with her father to Nagybecskerek (today Zrenjanin, Serbia) where she attended a boarding school. Her father began to neglect her. By the age of fifteen, she had become increasingly unmanageable and had frequently run away from home with numerous boyfriends, many of whom were significantly older than she was.

Shortly before the age of twenty, her first marriage was to a wealthy Austrian banker named Karl Schick, many years her senior. They had a son named Lorenzo. Renczi poisoned Schick's wine with arsenic after she discovered that Schick may have been cheating on her. After approximately a year of "mourning", she then declared that she had heard word of her supposedly estranged husband's death in a car accident.

== Subsequent murders ==
Shortly after allegedly hearing the news of her first husband's "automobile accident", Renczi remarried, this time to a man nearer her own age. However, the relationship was a tumultuous one and Renczi was again plagued by the suspicion that her new husband was involved in extramarital affairs. After only months of marriage, the man vanished and Renczi then told friends and family that he had abandoned her. After a year had passed, she then claimed to have received a letter from her husband proclaiming his intentions of leaving her forever. This was her last marriage.

Although Renczi did not remarry, she spent the next several years carrying out a number of affairs, some clandestine with married men, and others openly. The men came from an array of backgrounds and social positions. All vanished within months, weeks, and in some cases, even days after becoming romantically involved with her. When connected to men she was openly having an affair with, she invariably concocted stories of them being "unfaithful" and having "abandoned her".

She was caught after having poisoned her last lover, a bank officer named Milorad; his wife reported his disappearance to the police, who ignored her. Nevertheless, she pursued her own investigation and rapidly found that Vera was her husband's mistress. She went back to the police, who sent two inspectors to the chateau. She admitted to them that Milorad had been her lover, but claimed he had quit her. Impressed by her beauty, wealth, and excellent reputation, the police abandoned their search. The wife went back to the police and started to ask questions which should have been asked long before: where was her husband Joseph? Where was their son? What happened to the numerous other men who people knew were her lovers and had also disappeared? The police went back to see her; not only did she then deny that Milorad was her lover, which she had admitted before, but the police had proof, a love letter sent by her to her lover. The police got a search warrant and discovered a locked round cellar underground. In it were 35 spaces, each with a zinc-lined coffin inside. In the middle of the cellar were a red armchair, a big church candle, and an empty bottle of champagne. She told them that the coffins contained family members, but they insisted on opening one coffin. Inside, they found the decomposed body of a man; upon opening the rest, they found the same thing. After she was arrested, she confessed that she had poisoned all of them with arsenic when she suspected they had been unfaithful to her or when she believed their interest in her was waning. She also confessed that on occasion she liked to sit in the armchair, surrounded by the coffins of all her former lovers.

She was convicted of 35 murders and sentenced to death, but Yugoslavia did not execute women at that time. She was instead condemned to life in prison. During her trial, she started showing signs of schizophrenia. In prison, she began to talk to her victims. She died in 1939.

=== Personality ===
Early childhood friends described Renczi as having an almost pathological desire for constant male companionship and possessing a highly jealous and suspicious nature. Renczi did not socialize much, and only interacted with "gentlemen" that she invited over for dinner or to have sex with. According to Hannah Scott, Renczi was considered "a tragic figure in the community who could not keep a husband or a lover".

== In culture ==
Some have speculated that Renczi's story may have inspired Joseph Kesselring's play Arsenic and Old Lace, yet this is incorrect. It was the Amy Archer-Gilligan case which the playwright used as his model.

In 2005, The Discovery Channel's three-part series Deadly Women recounted the history of Renczi, portrayed through reenactments and commentaries from FBI agents, a criminal profiler Candice DeLong, and a forensic pathologist. Renczi was featured in the series' first episode titled "Obsession", where she is described as having killed her victims in the "1930s in Bucharest, Romania". As for her motivation, the voice-over says "modern analysis suggests she was simply looking for love."

On 17 March 2012, a depiction of Renczi appeared in the Daily Mirror, but it was proved to be a misidentified 2004 photograph, and an apology was printed.

== See also ==
- Baba Anujka
- Béla Kiss
- List of serial killers by number of victims
- List of serial killers by country
