= Lajtabánság =

1921 unrecognised Hungarian state in modern Austria

Banate of Leitha Lajtabánság
- October 4 – November 10, 1921
- Flag Coat of arms

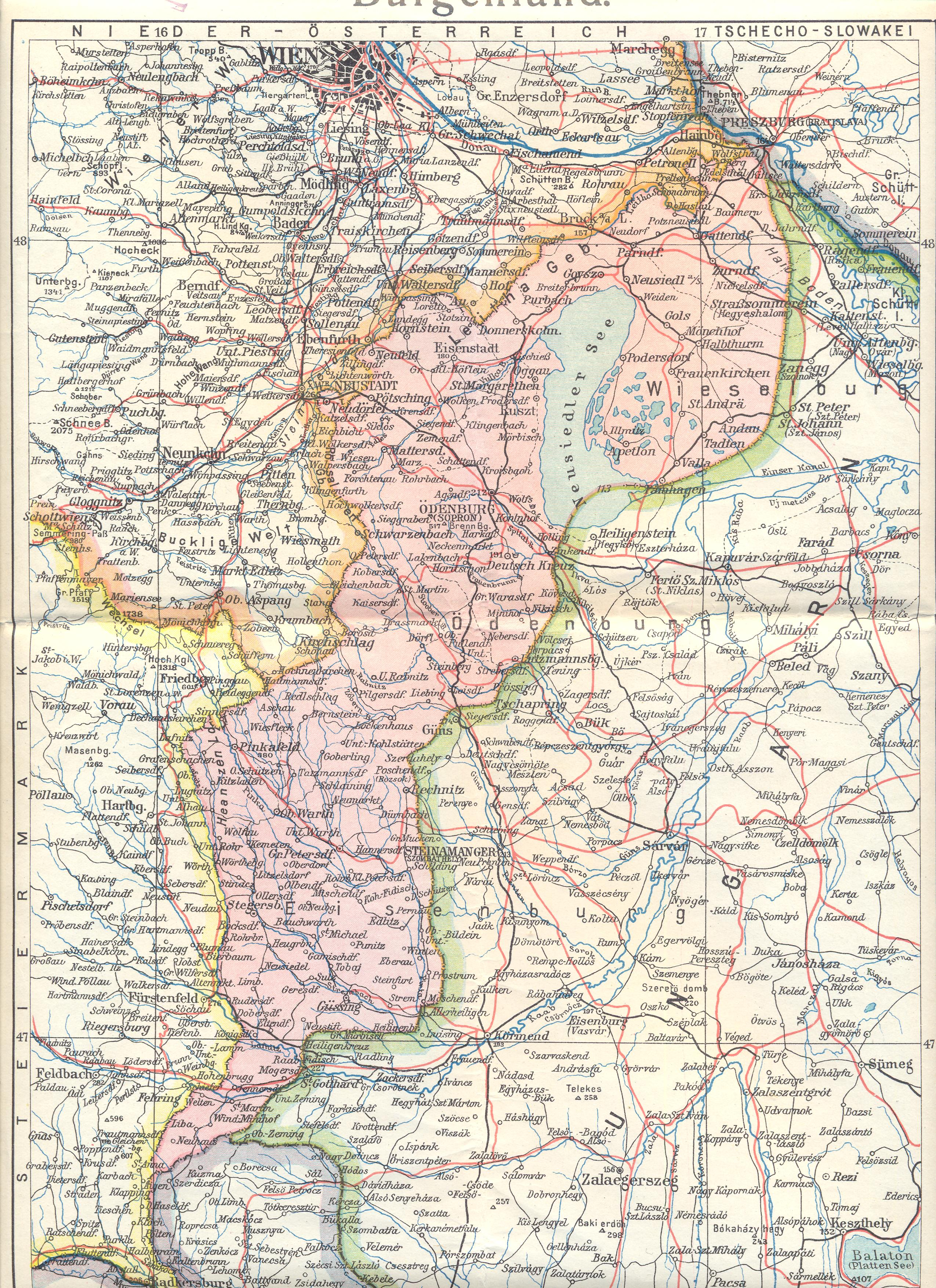
- Austrian territorial claims in West-Hungary, the region where the short-lived Hungarian occupied and governed Lajtabánság existed.
- Status: Unrecognized state
- Capital: Oberwart
- Government: Provisional government
- Leaders
- Historical era: Interwar period
  - Established: 4 October 1921
  - Disestablished: 10 November 1921
Preceded by	Succeeded by
Kingdom of Hungary (1920–1946)	First Austrian Republic; Kingdom of Hungary (1920–1946)

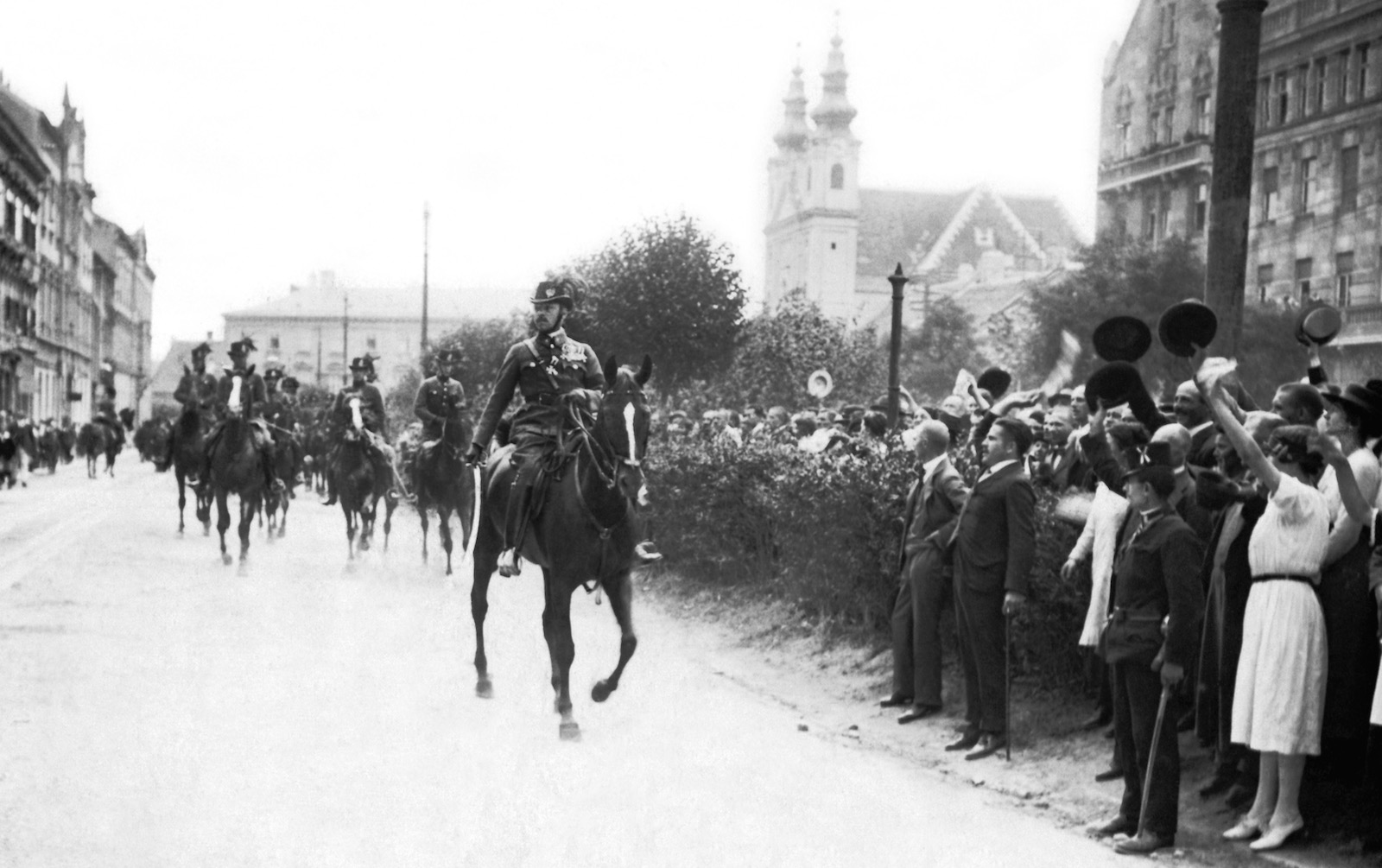
In 1921, Major Gyula Ostenburg-Moravek leads a detachment of mounted gendarmes through Sopron in support of the West-Hungarians who are protesting the Trianon Treaty which would turn over West Hungary to Austria.

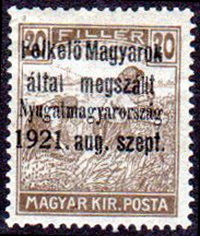
A provisional 20 forint stamp, issued on 12 October 1921

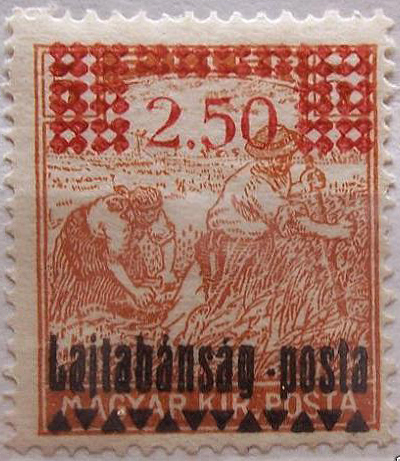
A provisional 2.5 forint stamp

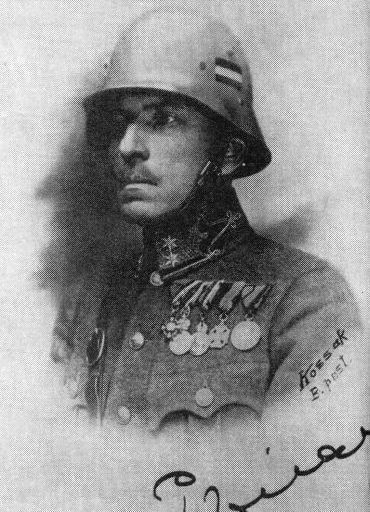
Pál Prónay, leader of the Rongyos Gárda

Lajtabánság (Hungarian pronunciation: [ˈlaɪtɒbaːnʃaːɡ]; German: Leitha-Banschaft), or the Banate of Leitha, was a short-lived western Hungarian state in the region that today forms the Austrian state of Burgenland. It existed between 4 October and 10 November 1921, following the Treaty of Trianon and the departure of the rump Kingdom of Hungary's army and after the Sopron plebiscite was held in the area according to the Venice Protocol.

The principal leaders of the state were Pál Prónay, Count Gyula Ostenburg-Moravek and former Hungarian prime minister István Friedrich. Its military was the Rongyos Gárda ("Ragged Guards" or "Scrubby Guards"), recruited from former army soldiers, peasants and students devoted to retaining the region rather than surrender it to Austria.

== Etymology ==
Lajta (or Leitha in German) refers to the Leitha River, which the region of Lajtabánság was East of. Leitha originated from Old High German lît, which was possibly derived from the Pannonian word for mud. Bánság refers to the lands held by a Ban (regional administrator), a word generally seen to be borrowed from Turkic languages by Slavs and used in Hungary and Croatia.

== Geography and people ==
Burgenland is a flat area, with some swamps and big settlements divided by large tracts of land. It was predominantly German, with the local Germans identifying themselves as Hungarians, known as Hungarus in German. In 1920, Burgenland was 75% Austrian German, 15% Croat, and 8% Hungarian, most of which were concentrated in the ethnic exclaves of Oberpullendorf and Oberwart. According to a 1918 census, Burgenland also had a 1.2% Jewish population.

According to the Austrians, Burgenland was historically, ethnically, and religiously Austrian German. The area was mostly Catholic, and German monks were important in shaping the culture and people of Burgenland. Geologist Hans Mohr of the technical college in Graz argued, in 1920, that:

According to language, habits, origin, and faith, the inhabitants of Burgenland belong to us. They are settlers originating from German core areas who, constituted as a kind of bold advanced guard, left the unfriendly mountains in the west behind them and migrated to [Burgenland's] fertile plains. Because they have not lived with us in one unified political unit since then, the location and development of their true country can only be discovered through geographical investigations.

Hungarian-born Austrian teacher Benno Immendörfer argued for the integration of Burgenland into Austria to secure Austria's supply of food, stating that:

The annexation of German Western Hungary to German Austria is a matter of life and death for German Austria, because this is the only way to ensure that Vienna, Lower Austria, and Eastern Styria are reliably supplied with foodstuffs and different agricultural products.

However, according to Hungarians, there were no antecedents for an Austrian takeover and integration of Burgenland. It was argued that places in Burgenland like Kismarton/Eisenstadt and Fraknó/Forchenstein had been Hungarian royal domains for centuries. Burgenland had only been partly Germanized due to Austrian influence, and the original ancestors of its inhabitants were Hungarians, sent to protect the Hungarian borderlands. Until the Treaty of Trianon, Burgenland had been a part of Hungary.

== History ==
=== After the Hungarian Soviet Republic ===
After the fall of the Hungarian Soviet Republic, Pál Prónay formed a small army of decommissioned officers and soldiers. These soldiers were responsible for the torture and execution of left-wing figures and people in the Hungarian capital, Budapest, as well as the Central Hungarian countryside (known as the White Terror) in response to the actions of the Lenin Boys led by Tibor Szamuely (known as the Red Terror). This band of soldiers was a predecessor of the Rongyos Gárda.

Soon, former admiral Miklós Horthy rose to the rank of Regent. The last King of Hungary IV. Karoly (Karl I of Austria) returned to Hungary and attempted to restore himself to the throne, but due to the ban on Habsburg restoration placed by the victorious Allied Powers, Horthy did not comply. Many Habsburg legitimists wanted his return, especially in Western Hungary, which would lead to the foundation of the Karlist faction in Lajtabánság.

=== Burgenland after the Treaty of Trianon ===
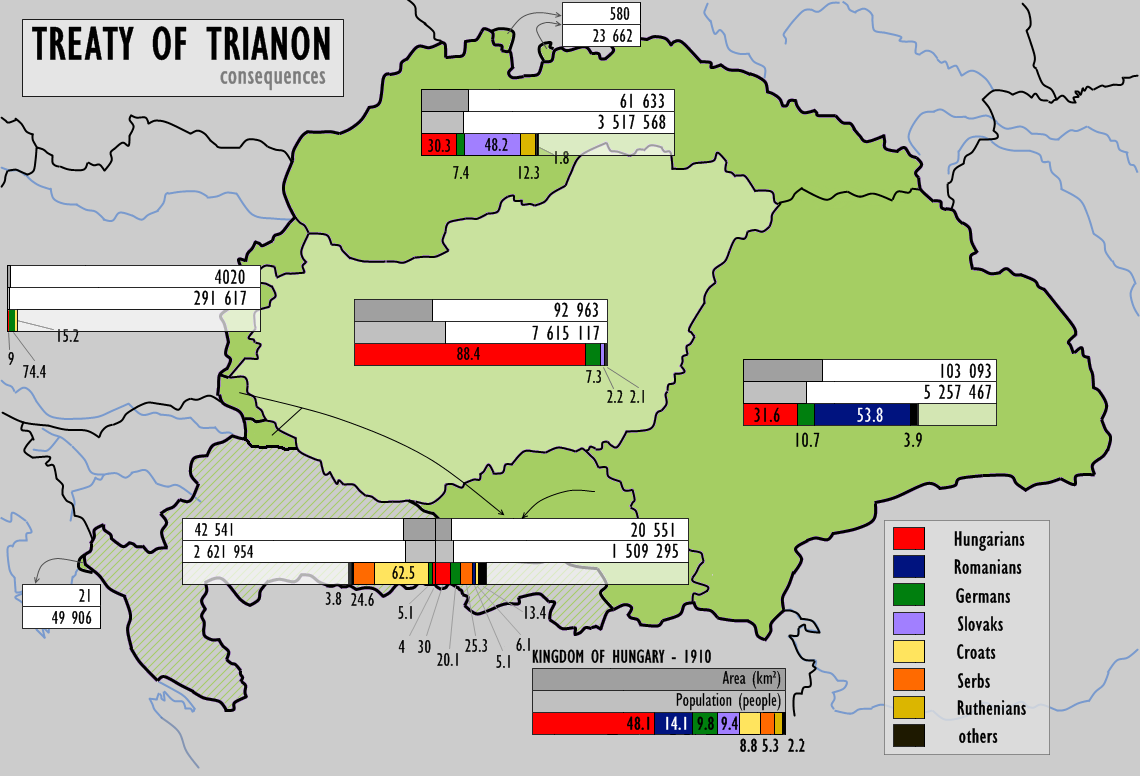
Map of the Treaty of Trianon

According to the Treaty of Trianon and the Treaty of Saint-Germain, several territories of Western Hungary were to be taken from the Kingdom of Hungary by Austria on 19 August 1921. In order to retain his position and power, Horthy was forced to accept the terms of the treaty. The Hungarian government hoped that they would be able to change the treaty and settle the hand-over by referendum, but their proposals were rejected by Austrian Chancellor Karl Renner multiple times. In January 1921, the Austrian National Assembly agreed to integrate the newly granted West Hungarian territory into Austria as Burgenland, a new federal state ((Bundes)land).

=== Creation of the Rongyos Gárda ===
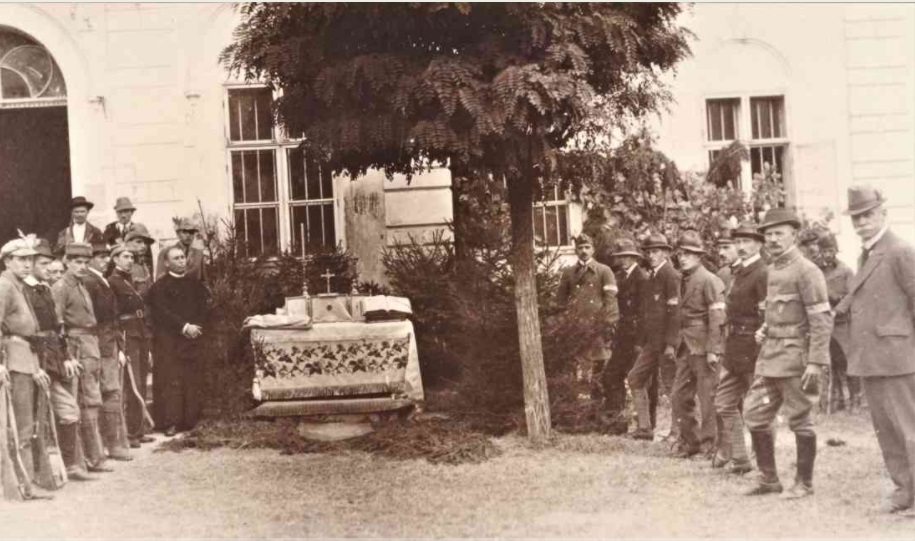
Members of the Rongyos Gárda on the proclamation of Lajtabánság in Oberwart

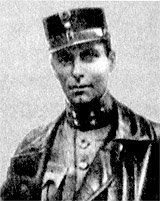
Iván Héjjas, one of the leaders of the Rongyos Gárda

In 1921, Pál Prónay started to organize a new paramilitary force - the Rongyos Gárda (Tattered/Scrubby Guard). The guard was organized (some sources say that it was organized in secret) and worked with the tacit consent of the Hungarian government. The insurgents were civilians, replacing military caps with a hood, the rim of which was fastened to the top of the hat with a cockade in the national colors of Hungary. The Rongyos Gárda consisted of peasants, college students, decommissioned military officers and Bosnian-Albanian Muslims who fought for the Kingdom of Hungary before Trianon (among them was Major Durics Hilmi Huszein, with nearly 300 associates). Aside from Prónay, Iván Héjjas was also a major figure and leader of the Rongyos Gárda. Young people from all over Hungary joined the Rongyos Gárda to fight for Western Hungary, but hardly any of them were actually from the region.

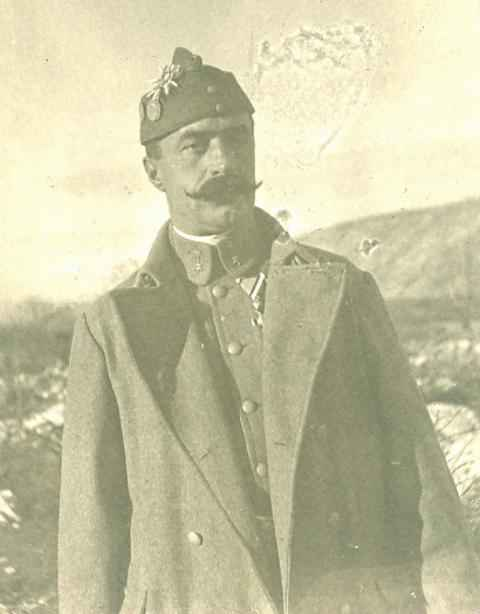
A Rongyos Gárda uniform (worn by Francia Kiss Mihály)

In 1921, Count Gyula Ostenburg-Moravek's hunter-battalion was stationed in Sopron. This unit did not belong to the Rongyos Gárda, but was a part of the Hungarian Army. It was available to be controlled by the Entente committee in Sopron, helping them to control the evacuation and surrender of the area. Aside from this battalion, the Hungarian army did not have any presence in the territory.

=== West Hungarian Uprising ===
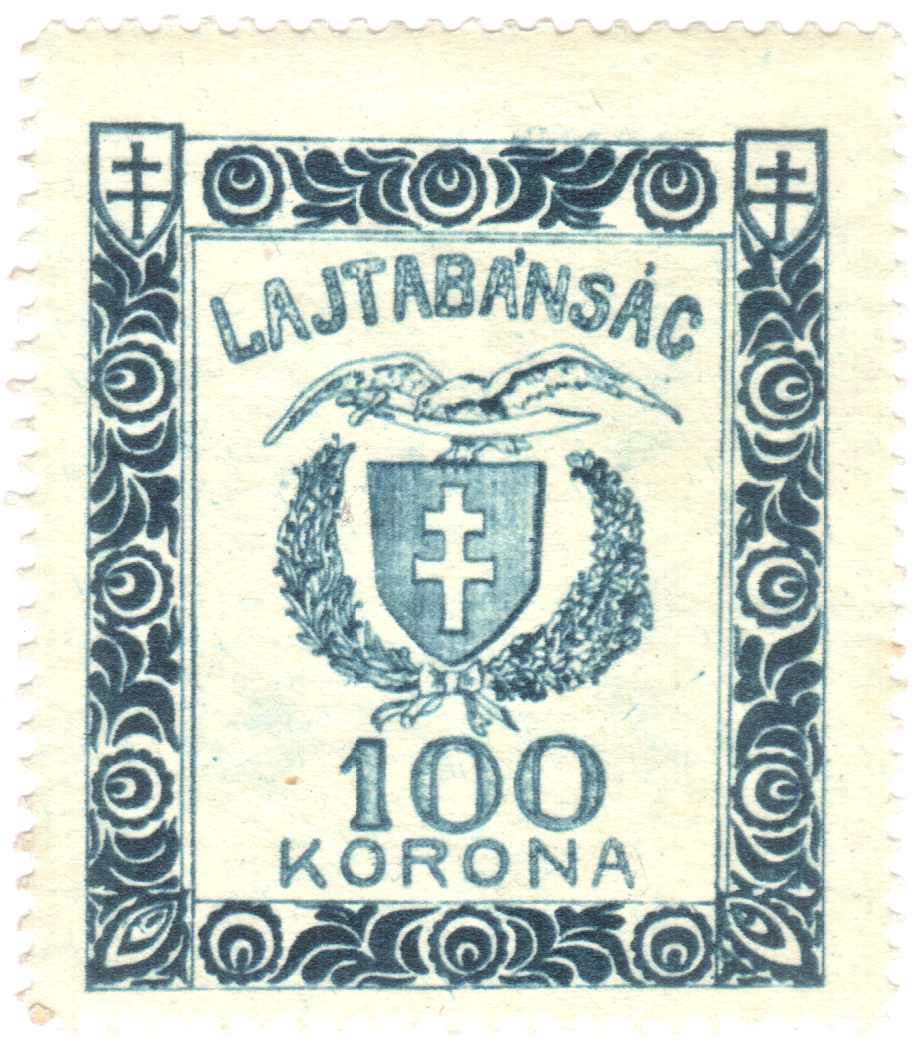
Lajtabánság 100 korona stamp

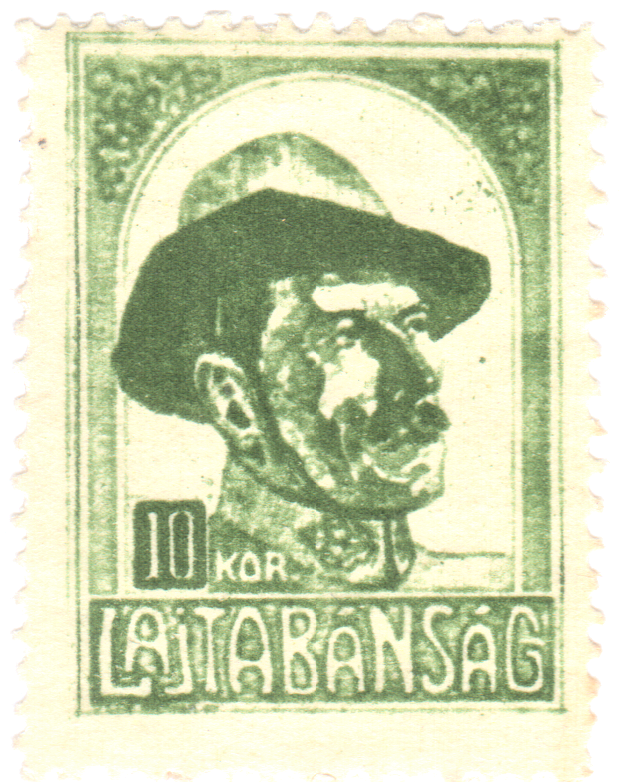
Lajtabánság 10 korona stamp, featuring Prónay's face

On 19 August 1921 the area was supposed to be handed over, but it was not, due to military resistance from the Rongyos Gárda. On August 28, an uprising started, with the Rongyos Gárda engaging in battle with the Austrian gendarmerie and a firefight starting at Ágfalva between the Austrians and 120 of Héjjas's men (the Great Plain Brigade). The Hungarian forces fought a guerrilla war against the Austrians, making it virtually impossible for Austria to take the territory. To the East of Sopron, there were rebels in every village. The Royal Hungarian Army had to evacuate due to the post-war treaties, and the Hungarian government had little control over the Rongyos Gárda. Former Prime Minister István Friedrich was involved, leading guerrillas at Kismarton (Eisenstadt).

Horthy appointed Gyula Gömbös as a regional commander in Western Hungary, with the task of regulating the Rongyos Gárda. However, both Héjjas and Friedrich refused to answer to Gömbös, retaining their autonomous actions. Prónay's main goal was to implement the Sigray-Lingauer Plan, formulated by Count Antal Sigray according to which, if the Hungarian government agreed with Austria in renouncing Western Hungary, the rebels would create an independent state called the Lajub. The title of Ban would have been given to Sigray or Archduke Albrecht Franz, Duke of Teschen. However, a referendum was in reach, so the Prime Minister dissuaded Sigray from his plan.

On 3 October 1921 Burgenland came under the de jure jurisdiction of the Entente (they had previously handed over control to the Austrians). On 4 October the Republic of Lajtabánság was declared in Felsőőr (Oberwart), which issued its own stamps and identification. Prónay's goal was now eventually rejoin Hungary after a plebiscite, writing in his memoirs that "In order to save Western Hungary, I have created an independent Lajtabánság." Trains between Austria and Hungary had to pay customs duties in the form of goods being taken off carriages. A total of 79 postage stamps and 6 postage due stamps were issued, which initially did not have watermarks. A Diocesan bishop also established a Vicariate in the area as the Dean of St. Michael at Güssing.

=== Downfall ===
The Republic of Lajtabánság was not permanent, and divides slowly started to show. A dispute started between the "free King-electors", who wanted to elect a monarch, which was the faction Prónay and Héjjas belonged to, and the Karlists, who supported the restoration of the Austrian Emperor and Hungarian King Karl I, which was the faction István Friedrich belonged to. Additionally, the Hungarian government also exerted pressure on Lajtabánság to avoid sanctions from the Allied Powers. The "Operetta-state" ended with the departure of the guerrillas on 10 November 1921, and the final engagement of the Austrian gendarmerie.

Previously, to solve the situation, on 11 and 12 October 1921, the Austrians began negotiations with Hungary in Venice. According to this agreement, the referendum must be held in Sopron, as well as 8 other villages as a condition for Lajtabánság to be dissolved. Prime Minister István Bethlen issued a letter to Sopron to order a withdrawal of the insurgents, which read:

Commander of all Public Security Offices in Western Hungary - Sopron. 1080 Issue 1921.

Majestic br. Pón Prónay m. kir. Lieutenant Colonel, Felsőőr.

Sopron, 18 September 1921.

At the behest of the Prime Minister Count Bethlen, I urge the Lieutenant Colonel to leave the territory of Western Hungary immediately, which would be transferred to Austria under the Treaty of Trianon..

Pál Prónay altb. s. k

The fate of Sopron and the surrounding areas were handled by referendum and Lajtabánság was dissolved.

Prónay later formed extremist right-wing organizations. On 20 March 1945 the Soviets captured him and took him away from Hungary. The place and time of his death are unknown.

== Government ==
Felsőőr became the center and capital of Lajtabánság, as it had a majority Hungarian population. Lajtabánság's independence was declared before the Felsőőr church. Prónay became the leader of the revolt. Captain László Apáthy was appointed chairman of the board of governors and rapporteur on religious affairs, Ferenc Lévay was lecturer on foreign affairs and Justice Lieutenant, Captain Béla Bárdos was attorney-at-law, Lieutenant György Hir, member of the Hungarian National Assembly was lecturer on economic affairs. The government needed money, but there was little to hope for in tax collection, as the area declared self-sufficient was small and the rebels had already looted it. However, tax collectors paid a hefty price for stamps printed at printing houses in Pest.

Lajtabánság was not the first uprising in the region: previously, the 1918 Republic of Heinzenland and the 1919 Republic of Prekmurje were declared as independent countries by regional forces.

== Legacy ==
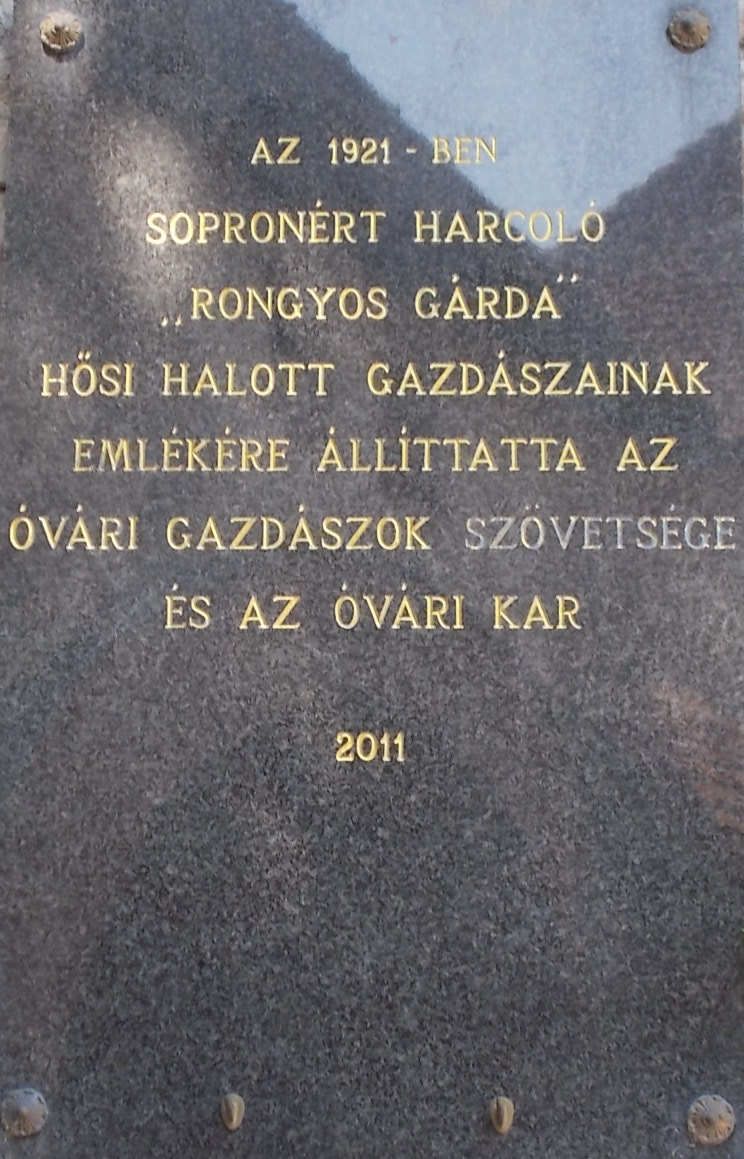
Memorial plaque dedicated to the Rongyos Gárda at the Széchenyi István University in Mosonmagyaróvár. The plaque reads "'Rongyos Gárda' (cca. 'Scrubby Guard', a group of soldiers who fought for Sopron in 1921)"

Aside from stamps and 2 issues of an official journal, the Executive Council has left nothing behind. Some documents have been preserved in the Hungarian National Archives, some of which were partially destroyed in 1945. Prónay found about 15 letters of correspondence between Gyula Gömbös and the leading council of the Etelközi Szövetség. Some of these letters are in the Austrian State Archives, and the text is only preserved because of Prónay's transcripts of his memoirs.

In the Trianon Museum in Várpalota, Lajtabánság and Prónay have a room dedicated to them.

On 3 October 2010 supporters of the Hungarian party Jobbik held a commemorative ceremony for Lajtabánság in Oberwart, which was approved by the Austrian authorities, resulting in an inquiry from the Green MP Karl Öllinger in the Austrian National Council.

== See also ==
- Rongyos Gárda
- Burgenland
- Uprising in West Hungary
