= Uprising in West Hungary =

1921 conflict after the Treaty of Trianon

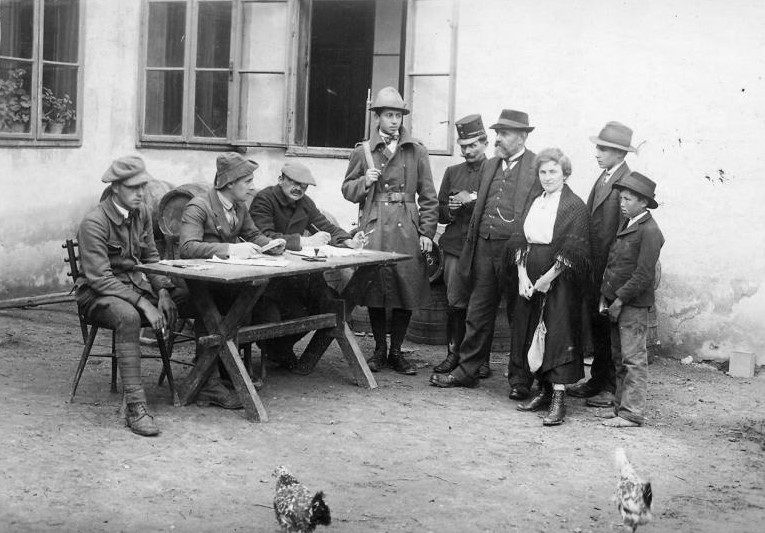
- Members of the Rongyos Gárda issuing Leithan travel documents to local residents, 1921
| Date | 28 August 1921 – 27 July 1922 (10 months, 4 weeks and 1 day) |
| Location | West Hungary (Sopron County, Moson County, Vas County) (today part of: Burgenland, Austria and Hungary) |
| Result | Hungarian victory: Referendum called |
| Territorial changes | Sopron and its area remained in Hungary |

Belligerents
| Austria; Hungary (Note: Disarmament of the rebels in 1922); Czechoslovakia (Note: Small border conflicts); France (Note: Non-combatant military mission) | Rongyos Gárda; Banate of Leitha; Bosniak volunteers; Albanian volunteers; Supported by: Hungary (Note: Covertly; until 1922) |

Commanders and leaders
| Johannes Schober; Robert Davy; Anton Petzt; Rudolf Plenert | Pál Prónay; Iván Héjjas; Mihály Francia Kiss; Antal Sigray; György Hir; Gyula Ostenburg-Moravek; Husein Hilmi Durić |

Strength
| ~500 Austrian police officers and gendarmeries | ~500–600 |

Casualties and losses
| 12 killed 46 wounded | 24 killed |

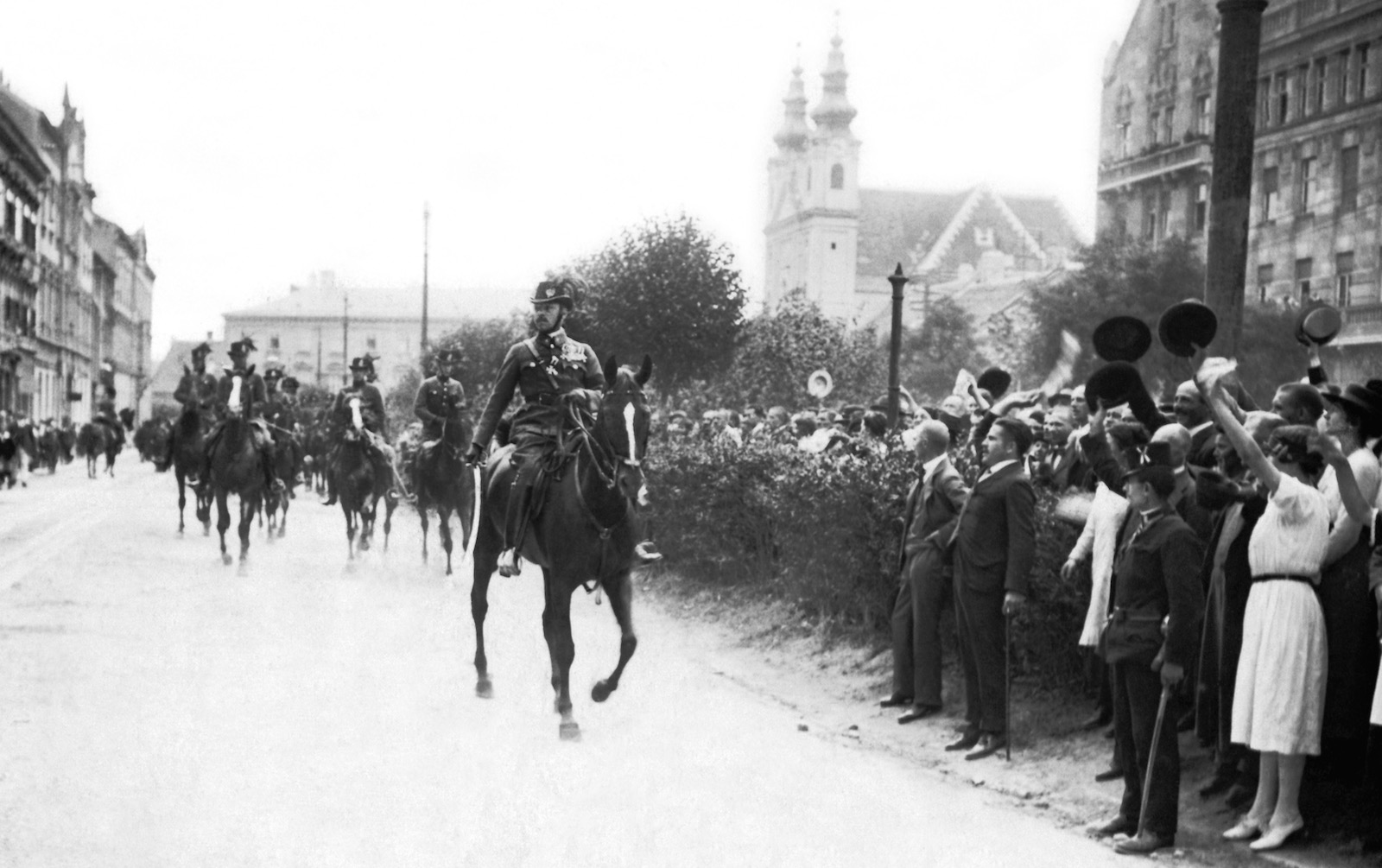
In 1921, Major Gyula Ostenburg-Moravek led a detachment of mounted gendarmes through Sopron in support of the West-Hungarians who were protesting the Trianon Treaty, which would turn over West Hungary to Austria.

According to the Treaty of Trianon, the city of Sopron in western Hungary and its surroundings were assigned to Austria. After an uprising in 1921 in this region, a referendum was held and 65.08% of the votes were in favor of belonging to Hungary. This referendum was accepted by the major powers and the transition of Sopron and its surrounding 8 villages from Austria to Hungary was the only serious territorial revision in the years following the Treaty of Trianon.

== In literature ==
- Gyula Somogyvári („Gyula diák”): És mégis élünk (novel)
- Dr. Jenő Héjjas: A Nyugat-magyarországi felkelés. Budapest, 1929.

== See also ==
- Lajtabánság

== Sources ==
- József Botlik. "A második nyugat-magyarországi felkelés". Vasiszemle.hu. Archived from the original on 22 October 2010.
- Sándor Sarkady, Jr. "Tüzek a végeken". w3.sopron.hu.
