= Rongyos Gárda =

1921 and 1938 Hungarian paramilitary unit

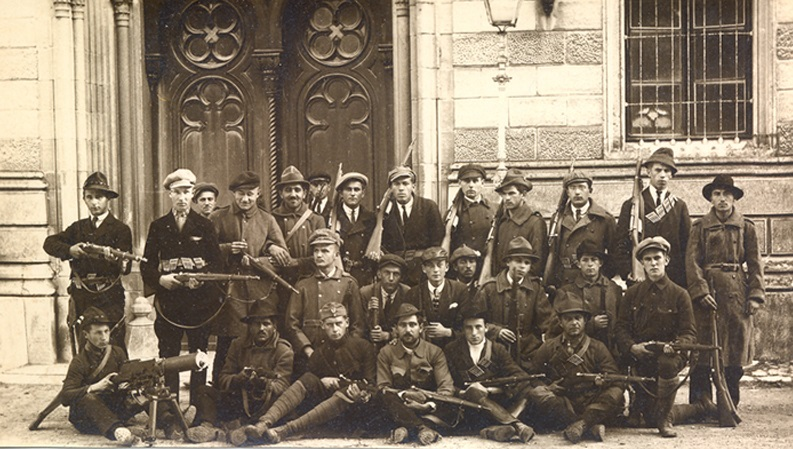
A squad of the Rongyos Gárda in Sopron (autumn, 1921)

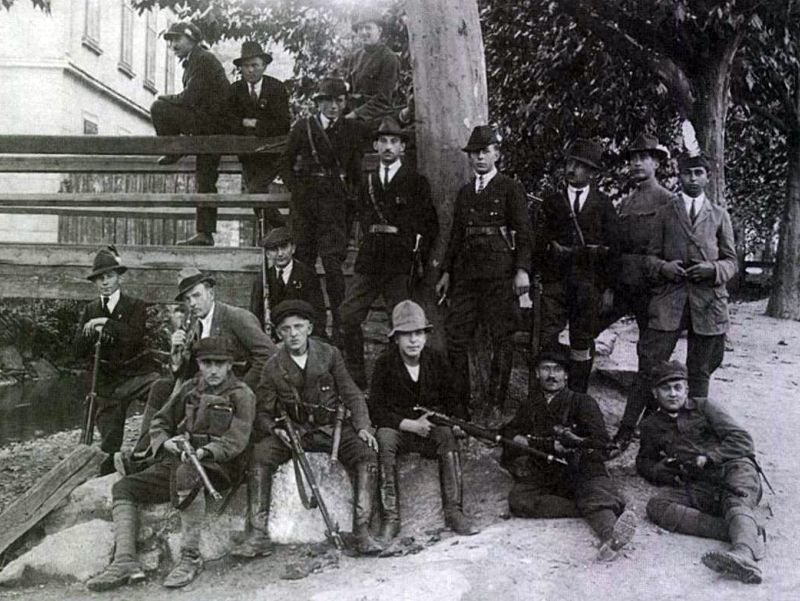
The fighters of the Rongyos Gárda in Eisenstadt

The "Rongyos Gárda" (Hungarian pronunciation: [ˈroɲɟoʃ ˈɡaːrdɒ], Scrubby or Ragged Guards) were a non-regular paramilitary unit in Hungary, active in 1921 then reestablished in 1938.

The Treaties of Trianon and Saint-Germain, which concluded the First World War, awarded a stretch of land (Burgenland) with mixed Hungarian but mainly ethnic German population to Austria. However, during August 1921 when Austrian police and customs officers attempted to occupy the area, their efforts were thwarted by armed resistors organised by the Rongyos Gárda. The Guards were a militia of Hungarian volunteers, many of them former soldiers of the anti-communist detachments that fought alongside Horthy's National Army. They were led by captain Pál Prónay. The name Scrubby Guards reflected the fact that they were a non-governmental force.

The Guards' primary goal was to reduce the land loss after the 1920 Treaty of Trianon. First they proclaimed a new country between Austria and Hungary, the Lajtabánság, supposedly ruled by their commander, Pál Prónay. At the same time they launched a series of attacks to oust the Austrian forces that entered the area. After the clashes, Sopron's status as part of Hungary (along with that of the surrounding eight villages) was decided by a local plebiscite held on December 14, 1921, with 65% voting for Hungary. Since then Sopron has been called Civitas Fidelissima ("The Most Loyal Town", Hungarian: A Leghűségesebb Város), and the anniversary of the plebiscite is a city holiday.

The Guards were reorganised in 1938 on the eve of Hungarian-Czechoslovak negotiations, which took place between October 9 and October 13, 1938, in Komárno aiming to resolve the territorial conflict between the two sides. The guerillas began to infiltrate into southern Slovakia and Ruthenia. The military pressure contributed to the decision of the Czechoslovak government to accept an international arbitration to solve the territorial dispute.

The historic role of the Scrubby Guards is disputed. Some historians claim they were saviors of Hungarian land, the only ones fighting the Trianon Peace Pact's dictations. During the communist rule they were depicted as savage terrorists, who killed innocent people. Parts from Pál Prónays diary were published during the 1960s in order to disseminate these views. The first books about their activity were only published after 1989. The existence of the Guards was rarely mentioned in Hungarian textbooks before the millennium.

== Notable members ==
- Dénes Egyedy Balázs
- György Endresz
- István Éhn
- Mihály Francia Kiss
- Imre Füvessy, jr.
- Gyula Füvessy
- Pál Gebhardt
- Ferenc Gyulai Molnár
- Iván Héjjas
- Károly Kaszala
- Imre Kémeri Nagy
- Miklós Kozma
- Viktor Maderspach
- Ferenc Pehm
- Pál Prónay
- Elemér Székely
- Árpád Taby
- László Vannay
- Hilmi Huszein Durics (of Bosniak origins)

== See also ==
- Uprising in West-Hungary
- Hungary during World War II
