= Vladimirovac =

Vladimirovac may refer to:

- Vladimirovac, Serbia, a village near Alibunar
- Vladimirovac, Croatia, a village near Gradina, Virovitica-Podravina County
