= Béla Kiss =

Hungarian serial killer

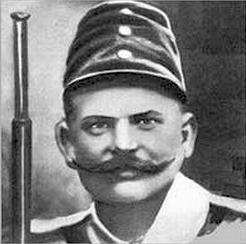
- Sketch of Béla Kiss
- Born: Kiss Béla c. 1877; Izsák, Austria-Hungary
- Disappeared: 4 October 1916
- Other names: Bela Kish, Monster of Cinkota
- Spouse(s): Júlia Peschadik (1905/1906–?); Mária (?–1912)
- Children: 2

Details
- Victims: 24+
- Span of crimes: 1900–1914
- Country: Hungary

Béla Kiss (/kɪʃ/; Hungarian: [ˈbeːlɒ ˈkiʃ]; c. 1877 – disappeared 4 October 1916) was a Hungarian serial killer. He is thought to have murdered at least 23 young women and one man, and conserved their corpses in large metal drums that he kept on his property.

== Early life ==
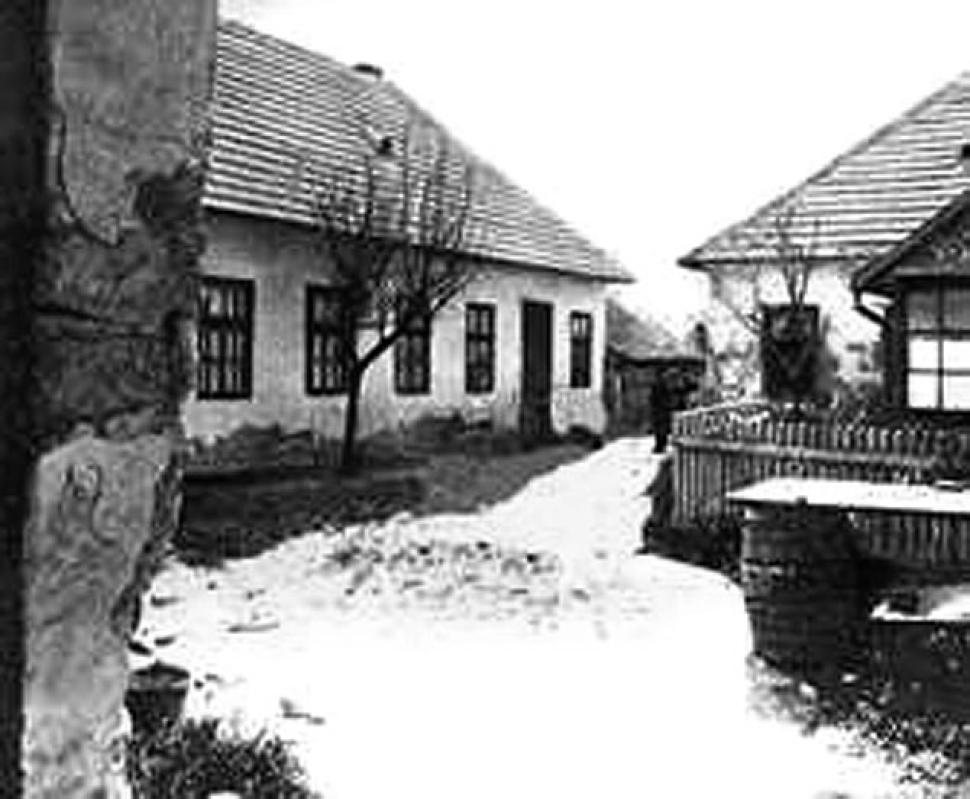
Béla Kiss' home (left)

Béla Kiss was born circa 1877 in Izsák, Austria-Hungary, to János Kiss and Verona Varga.

Kiss moved to Cinkota (then a town near Budapest, now a neighbourhood of the 16th district within the city itself) in 1900. According to Magyar Nemzet in 1907: "Béla Kiss, a tinsmith in Cinkota, unmarried, lives in a furnished apartment, has his own business as a tinsmith, is regularly employed by his business partners. He is of good character, he is not in debt, he was not insolvent, he always fulfils his obligations, his lifestyle is solid, can be offered for credit."

In 1912, Kiss hired a housekeeper, Mrs. Jakubec. She noticed that Kiss corresponded with a number of women, typically through advertisements he would place in newspapers offering his services as either a matrimonial agent or a fortune teller, and sometimes brought the women individually to his home. However, his housekeeper had little contact with the women.

Kiss was never on intimate terms with his neighbours, even though he was well-liked. Townsfolk also noticed that Kiss had collected a number of metal drums. When the town police questioned him about the drums, he told them that he filled them with fuel in order to prepare for rationing in the oncoming war.

When World War I began in 1914, he was conscripted and left his house in Jakubec's care. He fought in Serbia before being captured.

== Criminal case ==
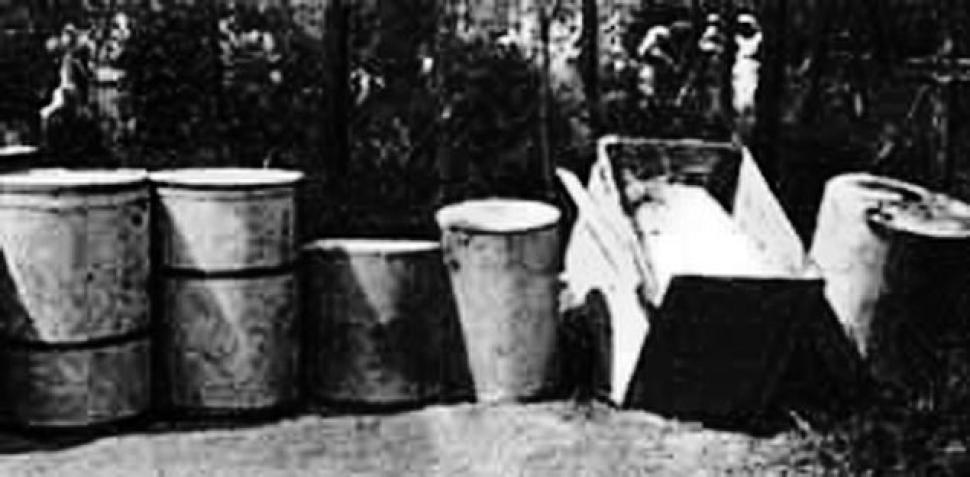
When Béla Kiss' landlord poked a hole in one of his tenant's barrels, he was overwhelmed by the "smell of death".

According to an article published in Népszava on 10 May 1916, referring to a "police inspector's report", Márton Kresinszky, the owner of the house rented by Kiss, wanted to renovate the building, so he went to Cinkota, where Kiss's neighbour, an old acquaintance of Kresinszky, pharmacist Béla Takács, told him that Kiss had gone to war in 1914 and supposedly died in 1915. In search of material for redecoration, the two men went to the chamber next to Kiss's workshop, where Takács said there had been a large quantity of reeds. In the chamber they found seven tin drums, stacked one metre long and fifty centimetres wide. After they pried the airtight lead-sealed lid of the top barrel open with an axe, a terrible stench emanated from it. The lid was removed and a bag was found, which was pulled out of the cylinder. A woman's body was found inside the bag. After opening another barrel, again a corpse smell emanated and a lock of blonde hair fell out. Kresinszky and Takács then informed the authorities. The chief notary Gyula Huszka, together with police officers, found a female body in each of the seven barrels. A search of Kiss' property resulted in a total of 24 bodies. Famed Austria-Hungarian author Frigyes Karinthy was present and described the following:

I stood there in the cemetery in Czinkota, in front of the tin barrels, and watched one by one as the contents of the opened barrels were poured out onto the autopsy table. Tin barrels of different heights: equally tinned, precisely, with conscientious work. Those who opened the first barrel did not doubt for a moment that the other contents were the same, although this assumption meant an unimaginable horror. And those of us who were there at the opening, all of us took it for granted that a small woman fell to the ground from the smaller barrel, and a larger one from the larger one. And after the second barrel, we also knew how to turn the barrel, how deep to reach, and where to grab the string on the neck of the emerging female head, where the loop would be, how it leads down to the legs, and it is knotted. This is how a proper, precise collector works, one who understands his craft and "likes order."

Charles Nagy, head of detectives in Budapest, informed the military that they should arrest Kiss immediately, if he was still alive; there was also a possibility that he was a prisoner of war. His name, unfortunately, was very common. Nagy also arrested Jakubec and asked the postal service to hold any possible letters to Kiss, in case he had an accomplice who could warn him. Nagy initially suspected that Jakubec might have had something to do with the murders, especially since Kiss had left her money in his will. Jakubec assured police that she knew absolutely nothing about the murders. She showed them a secret and locked room that Kiss had told her never to enter. The room was filled with bookcases and had a desk, which held a number of letters, Kiss' correspondence with 74 women, and a photo album. Many of the books were about poisons or strangulation. From the letters, Nagy discerned several things. The oldest of the letters were from 1903, and it became clear that Kiss was defrauding the women —usually middle-aged— who had been looking for marriage. He had placed ads in the marriage columns of several newspapers and had selected mainly women who had no relatives living nearby and knew no one who would quickly notice their disappearance. He wooed them and convinced them to send him money. Police also found old court records that indicated that two of his victims had initiated court proceedings, because he had taken money from them. Both women had disappeared, and the cases had been dismissed.

Each woman who came to the house was strangled. Kiss conserved their corpses in alcohol inside sealed airtight metal drums. Police found that the bodies had puncture marks on their necks and that their bodies were drained of blood, which led them to believe that Kiss may have been practicing vampirism.

== Escape ==
On 4 October 1916, Nagy received a letter that stated that Kiss was treated in a Serbian hospital. However, Nagy arrived at the hospital too late; Kiss had fled and left the corpse of another soldier in his bed. Nagy alerted all the Hungarian police, but all the alleged sightings police investigated were false.

== Sightings ==
On several later occasions, speculation arose that Kiss had perhaps faked his death by exchanging identities during the war with a dead soldier named Mackaree. He was reportedly sighted numerous times in the following years. Various rumours circulated as to his actual fate, including that he had been imprisoned for burglary in Romania or he had died of yellow fever in Turkey. In 1920, a soldier in the French Foreign Legion reported on another legionnaire named Hoffman, the name Kiss had used in some of his letters, who had boasted how good he was at using a garrote and who fit Kiss' description. "Hoffman" deserted before police could reach him.

The last known supposed sighting occurred in 1932 in New York City, US. That year, homicide detective Henry Oswald was certain he had observed Kiss emerging from the New York City Subway at Times Square. There were also rumours that Kiss was living in the city and working as a janitor, although these could not be verified. When the police went to interview the janitor, he had already left.

Kiss' eventual fate and exact number of victims remain unknown.

== In popular culture ==
- The play Thirty-Two by Antonin Artaud was inspired by the case.
- The second half of David Kuhnlein's book Bloodletter was inspired by Béla Kiss. The stories "Béla Kiss Goes to the Theatre" and "Béla Kiss Goes to War" are excerpts from his novella.
- The German horror movie Bela Kiss: Prologue (English: The Kiss of a Killer) by director Lucien Förstner released in 2013 is based on Kiss' biography.
- The novel Hill House by Gopi Kottoor was inspired by the true events in the life of Béla Kiss.
- The band Bela Kiss, a metal/hardcore band from Long Island, US, named themselves after the murderer.
- The UK band Bela kiss, a death metal/grindcore band from London
- Songs inspired by the Béla Kiss murder case:
  - "The Alphabet Serial Song" by Amoree Lovell lists Béla Kiss as the B
  - "Bela Kiss" by Bloodsucking Zombies from Outer Space
  - "Bela Kiss" by Gazpacho
  - "Bella Kiss" by John 5
  - "Bella's Kiss" by Funke and the Two Tone Baby
  - In Israel, a famous Serial Killer inspired podcast hosted by Maya Gazit, had evolved into a Live session offering. The Podcast had various serial killers, but the live sessions have been centered around Bella Kiss. The shows have consistently sold out and received very well across all audiences.

== See also ==
- List of serial killers by country
- List of serial killers by number of victims
- List of fugitives from justice who disappeared
- Elizabeth Báthory
- Vera Renczi
