= Republic of Heinzenland =

European country (1918)

Republic of Heinzenland Republik Heinzenland Republik Hoanznlaund (local dialect) Hiénc Köztársaság
- 1918
- Status: Unrecognized state
- Capital: Mattersburg
- Government: Republic
- Historical era: World War I
  - Established: December 5, 1918
  - Disestablished: December 7, 1918
Preceded by	Succeeded by
Austria-Hungary	First Austrian Republic; Kingdom of Hungary (1920–46)

The Republic of Heinzenland (German: Republik Heinzenland; German pronunciation: [ʁepuˈbliːk 'haɪntsn̩lant]) was a short-lived and unrecognized nation in the region that is now known as the Austrian federal state of Burgenland. It was aimed at protecting the German-speaking population in Western Hungary. The state was a direct result of the disputes in Central Europe following the First World War on whether the future of Burgenland would be under Austrian or Hungarian control. Its main leader was the Social Democratic politician Hans Suchard. Its short life has made it known as the "Two-Day Republic". It was one of many unrecognized successor states in the region, including Lajtabánság and the Republic of Prekmurje.

== Etymology ==
The name "Heinzenland" is derived from the German name for Western Hungary, Heanzenland, Hianzenland, or Hoanzenland (Heinzenland in Standard German). The name "Heanzen" or any variation of it in local dialects referred to German settlers in Western Hungary (west of Sopron), who immigrated from Bavaria and other parts of Germany to Hungary while keeping their dialects (hence the variation between the names).

There are different theories as to why the Heinzen was used. It may have been used to mock this group of German-speakers for their deviation from the Bavarian hiaz (now), instead using hianz. It might also have been derived from the common name Heinz, or from the followers of Henry II, Duke of Bavaria, Henry I Kőszegi, or Henry IV, Holy Roman Emperor, under whose reigns the settlers came.

== Background ==
The formation of the First Hungarian Republic and the Republic of German-Austria during the fall of Austria-Hungary had the governments of the two nations in a precarious situation. They suffered from an economic and social crisis that included heavy problems with food and coal supplies. Both Austrians and Hungarians found themselves in new countries that sprung out of the demise of Austria-Hungary - importantly, the Germans of Western Hungary. In November 1918, the Hungarian National Council set up branches in the region, but they quickly realized the problem that Burgenland was to become. The Austrian government, or Staatsrat, officially claimed the territories of Moson, Sopron, Vas, and Bratislava on November 12. In accordance with the Austrian idea that any German-speaking population could and should voluntarily form a union (in the form of Austria), the Austrian government formed the Westungarische Kanzlei, or West Hungary Council to accelerate the disintegration of Hungarian power in the region, push popular opinion towards a union with Austria, and prepare for an annexation of the territory. Staatsrat member Raimund Neunteufel and the Verein zur Erhaltung des Deutschtums in Ungarn also played a role in the push for the annexation of the region by Austria.

Soon after, Austrians working for the Austrian government began to distribute propaganda in the region. The first to protest against Hungarian rule were the locals of Mattersburg, who were against the teaching of Hungarian in schools. On November 17, locals from Bad Sauerbrunn and Pöttsching declared their desire for annexation by Austria. Weapons shipments started in December - On December 5, a truck carrying 300 rifles from Wiener Neustadt bound towards Burgenland was intercepted by the Hungarian police at Neufeld an der Leitha. Another shipment on the same day, also of 300 guns, successfully reached its destination of Mattersburg. Rifles were distributed among the locals, who prepared to take the town and its environs.

== The Two-Day Republic ==
On December 5, 1918 (some sources claim the Republic was actually proclaimed on December 6), two weeks after the Staatsrat demanded the self-determination of German-speaking settlements in Western Hungary, Social Democratic politician Hans Suchard, with the help of workers and local Social Democrats in Mattersburg, proclaimed the Republic of Heinzenland. This was done, apparently, without sufficient knowledge of power relations in the region. The Republic was formed with the intention of preparing the annexation of the region by Austria.

However, one day later, an armored train and a machine gun squad sent by the Hungarian military, helped by vigilantes from Sopron, put an end to the Republic, quickly occupying its territory without bloodshed. When interrogated, the rebels claimed they had been connected to the Austrian government. However, the Austrian government denied any association with the Republic - they sought to avoid any conflict with Hungary.
