= Maria Swanenburg =

Dutch serial killer

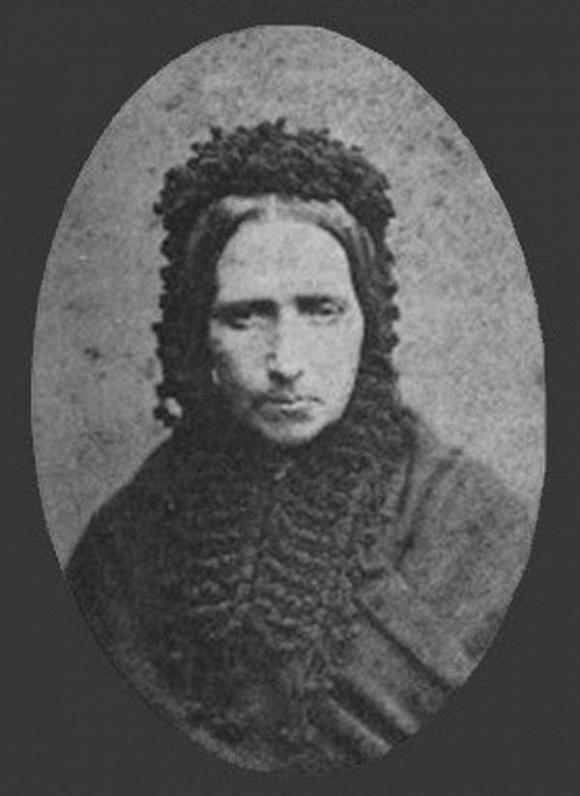
- Born: Maria Catherina Swanenburg; 9 September 1839; Leiden, Netherlands
- Died: 11 April 1915 (aged 75); Gorinchem, Netherlands
- Other name: "Goeie Mie"

Criminal details
- Motive: Life insurance payout
- Method: Arsenic poisoning
- Victims: 27 confirmed, more than 90 suspected
- Crime span: 1880–1883
- Apprehended: December 1883
- Conviction: Murder (three counts)
- Sentence: Life imprisonment

Maria Catherina van der Linden-Swanenburg (9 September 1839 – 11 April 1915) was a Dutch serial killer who murdered at least 27 people and was suspected of killing more than 90 people.

== Early life ==
Maria Swanenburg was the daughter of Clemens Swanenburg and Johanna Dingjan. After Swanenburg's first two daughters died at a young age, she married Johannes van der Linden on 13 May 1868. The result of this marriage was five sons and two daughters. The marriage lasted until 29 January 1886.

Her nickname was "Goeie Mie" ("Good Mie"), bestowed because of her amiable, neighbourly assistance with babysitting and taking care of the poor, sick, and elderly in Leiden, where she herself lived.

== Murders ==
Her first victim was her mother Johanna, in 1880; not long thereafter, she poisoned her father, Clemens.

It was established with certainty that Swanenburg poisoned at least 102 people with arsenic between 1880 and 1883. Twenty-seven of her victims died, of whom 16 were her relatives. The investigation included more than 90 suspicious deaths. 45 survivors sustained chronic health issues after having ingested the poison.

Swanenburg's motive was the payout of her victims' insurance or their inheritance. She had secured most of the insurance policies herself.

=== Capture and imprisonment ===
Swanenburg was caught after she poisoned the Frankhuizen family in December 1883. Her trial began on 23 April 1885. Swanenburg was found guilty of having killed at least three victims, and she was sentenced to life imprisonment in a correctional facility, where she died in 1915.

== See also ==
- List of serial killers by country
- Baba Anujka

The True Crime Podcast In Search of Lost Crime did an episode on Goeie Mie

Technical University Delft TV made an episode about the minerals used in the killing, watch it here.
