= Vladimirovac, Serbia =

Village in Serbia

Vladimirovac Владимировац
- Village (Selo)
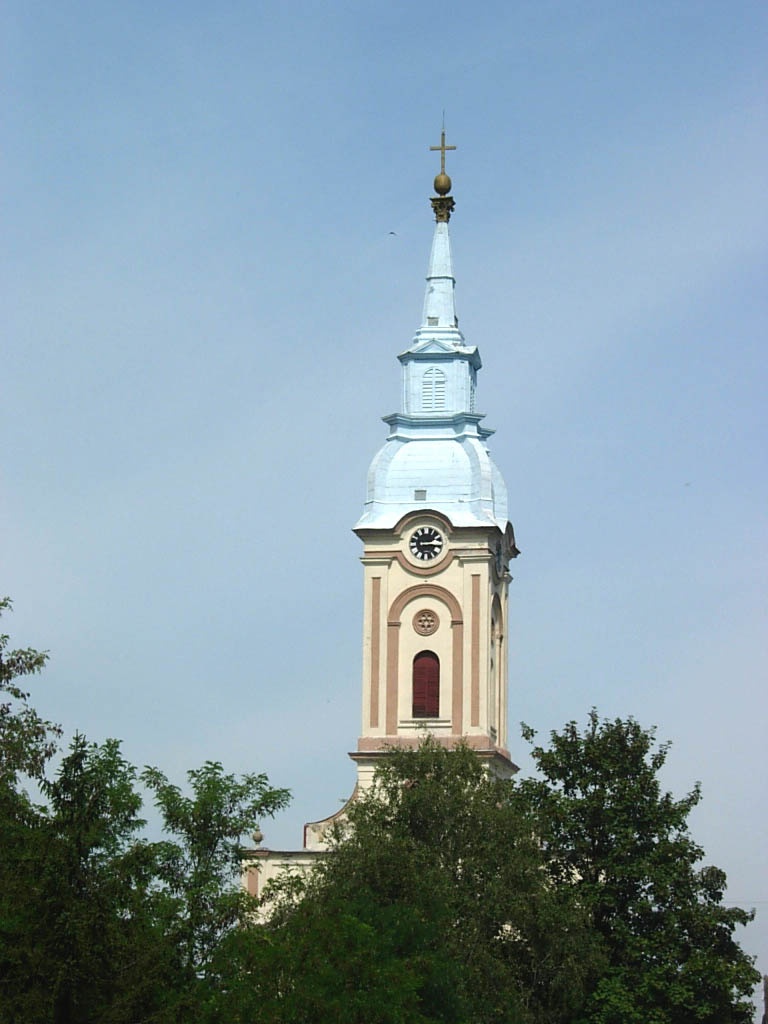
- The Romanian Orthodox church

- Location of Vladimirovac within Serbia Vladimirovac (Serbia) Vladimirovac (Europe)
- Coordinates: 45°02′50″N 20°52′56″E
- Country: Serbia
- Province: Vojvodina
- District: South Banat
- Municipality: Alibunar
- Elevation: 146 m (479 ft)

Population (2022)
  - Vladimirovac: 3,237
- Time zone: UTC+1 (CET)
  - Summer (DST): UTC+2 (CEST)
- Postal code: 26315
- Area code: +381(0)13
- Car plates: PA

Vladimirovac (Serbian Cyrillic: Владимировац) is a village in Serbia. It is situated in the Alibunar municipality, in the South Banat District, Vojvodina province. The village has a Serb ethnic majority and a population of 3,237 people (2022 census).

== Name ==
In Serbian, the village is known as Vladimirovac or Владимировац; in Romanian as Pătrovăsâla or/also spelled "Petrovăsâla;" in German as Petersdorf; and in Hungarian as Petre (named after the Napoleonic-era general Peter Duka von Kadar).

== Ethnic groups (2002 census) ==
- Serbs = 2,259 (54,95%)
- Romanians = 1,424 (34.63%)
- Roma = 110 (2.67%)
- others.

== Historical population ==
Historical population
| Year | Pop. | ±% |
|---|---|---|
| 1961 | 4,750 | — |
| 1971 | 4,583 | −3.5% |
| 1981 | 5,106 | +11.4% |
| 1991 | 4,539 | −11.1% |
| 2002 | 4,111 | −9.4% |
Source: 1991

== Sites ==
Wells at street intersections in Vladimirovac date back from the first decade of the 19th century. As an example of the beginning of a modern organized water supply of the settlement, they are a protected cultural monument of great importance.

The present Romanian Orthodox Church was built from 1859 to 1863, in the neoclassical style, with 63m tall tower that dominates the surrounding landscape.

On 8 December 1894, a railway station for rail Vršac - Kovin was opened, and on 26 August 1896 the Pančevo rail opened as well.

== Notable people ==
- Dejan Dražić, footballer
- Baba Anujka, serial killer

== See also ==
- List of places in Serbia
- List of cities, towns and villages in Vojvodina

== Gallery ==
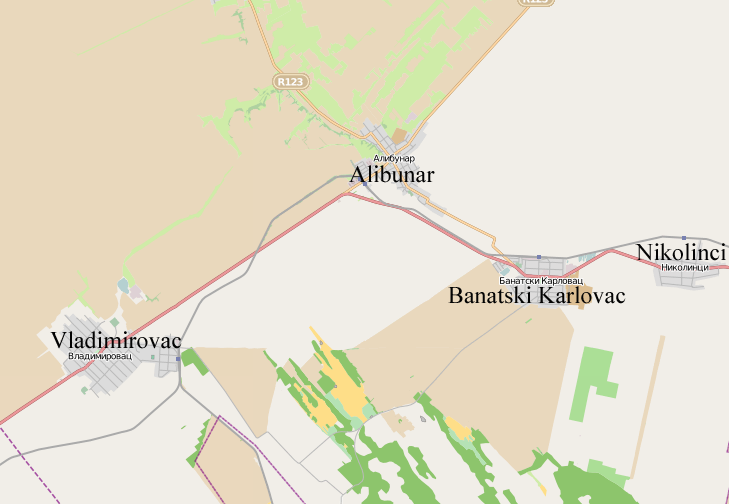
Map of Vladimirovac and other settlements in the neighborhood
