= Bajtava =

Bajtava Bajta
- Municipality
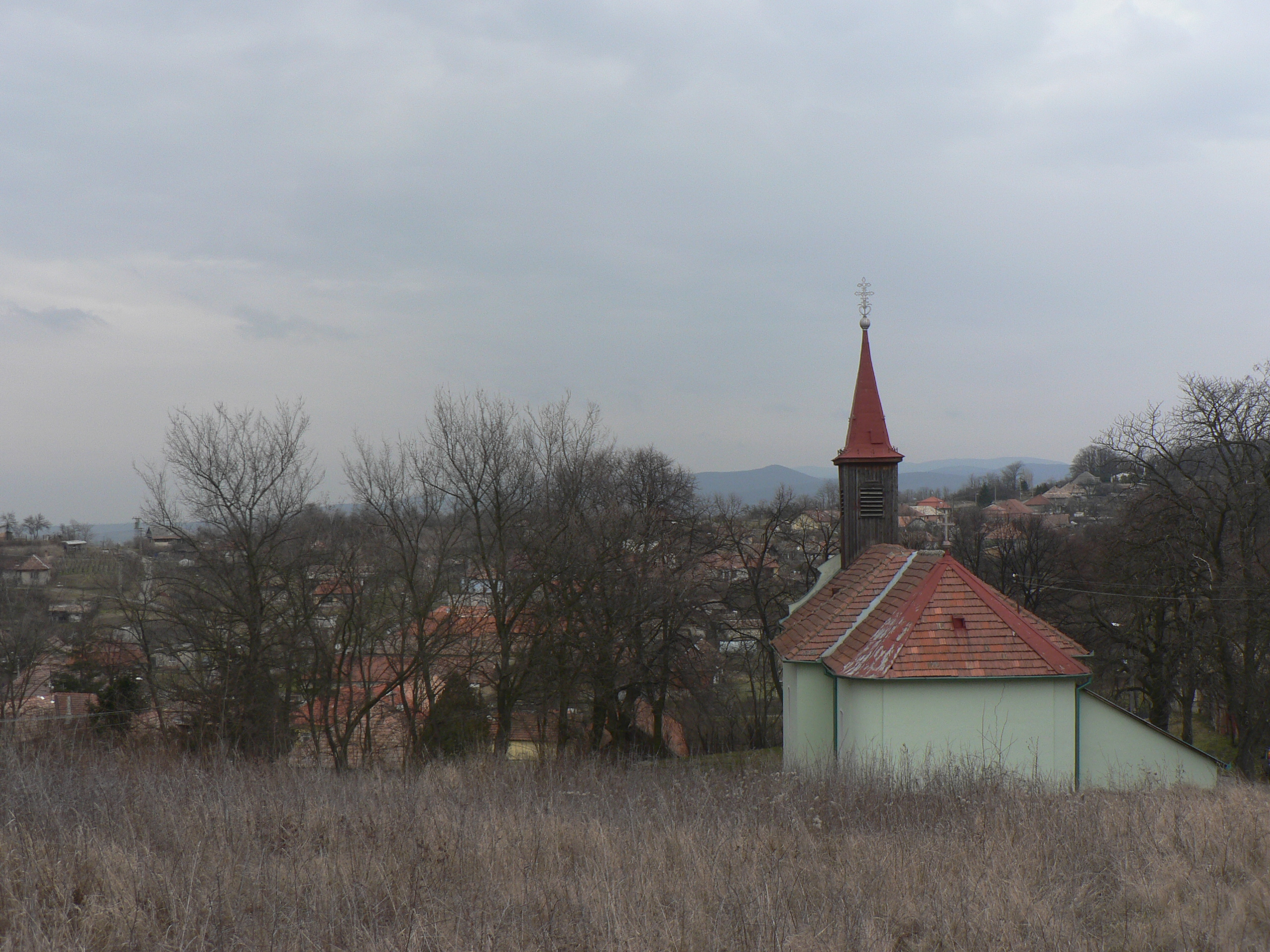

- Flag

- Location of Bajtava in the Nitra Region Location of Bajtava in Slovakia
- Coordinates: 47.85°N 18.75°E
- Country: Slovakia
- Region: Nitra Region
- District: Nové Zámky District
- First mentioned: 1261

Area
  - Total: 9.32 km^{2} (3.60 sq mi)
- Elevation: 174 m (571 ft)

Population (2025)
  - Total: 384
- Time zone: UTC+1 (CET)
  - Summer (DST): UTC+2 (CEST)
- Postal code: 943 65
- Area code: +421 36
- Vehicle registration plate (until 2022): NZ
- Website: bajtava.sk

Bajtava (Hungarian: Bajta) is a municipality and village in the Nové Zámky District in the Nitra Region of south-west Slovakia.

== History ==
In historical records the village was first mentioned in 1261.

== Geography ==
The municipality lies at an altitude of 174 metres (571 ft) and covers an area of 9.32 km^{2} (3.60 sq mi) (2025).

== Population ==
Population statistic (10 years)
Year	1995	2005	2015	2025
Count	410	393	404	384
Difference		−4.14%	+2.79%	−4.95%

Population statistic
Year	2024	2025
Count	384	384
Difference		+0%

It has a population of 384 people (31 December 2025).

=== Ethnicity ===
Census 2021 (1+ %)
Ethnicity	Number	Fraction
Hungarian	317	80.86%
Slovak	57	14.54%
Not found out	51	13.01%
Romani	4	1.02%
Total	392	

In year 2021 was 392 people by ethnicity 317 as Hungarian, 57 as Slovak, 51 as Not found out, 4 as Romani and 1 as Czech.

Note on population: The difference values of population numbers in the table "Population statistic" and in the sections "Ethnicity" & "Religion" is caused by the use of various statistical methods.

=== Religion ===
Census 2021 (1+ %)
Religion	Number	Fraction
Roman Catholic Church	290	73.98%
None	50	12.76%
Not found out	39	9.95%
Calvinist Church	6	1.53%
Total	392	

In year 2021 was 392 people by religion 290 from Roman Catholic Church, 50 from None, 39 from Not found out, 6 from Calvinist Church, 2 from Christian Congregations in Slovakia, 1 from Old Catholic Church, 1 from Other and not ascertained christian church, 1 from Jehovah's Witnesses, 1 from Islam and 1 from Greek Catholic Church.

== Ethnicity ==
The population is about 91% Hungarian and 6% Slovak.

== Genealogical resources ==
The records for genealogical research are available at the state archive in Nitra (Slovak: Štátny archív v Nitre).

- Roman Catholic church records (births/marriages/deaths): 1718-1787 (parish B), 1837-1895 (parish A)
- Census records 1869 of Bajtava are not available at the state archive.

== See also ==
- List of municipalities and towns in Slovakia
