= Izsák, Hungary =

Izsák
- Town
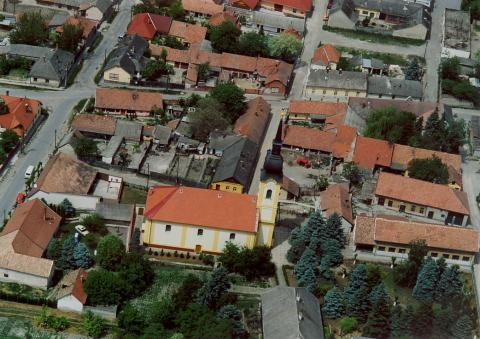
- Aerial photograph of Izsák

- Flag Coat of arms

- Location within Hungary
- Coordinates: 46.80047°N 19.35961°E
- Country: Hungary
- County: Bács-Kiskun
- District: Kiskőrös

Area
  - Total: 113.76 km^{2} (43.92 sq mi)

Population (2015)
  - Total: 5,622
  - Density: 49.42/km^{2} (128.0/sq mi)
- Time zone: UTC+1 (CET)
  - Summer (DST): UTC+2 (CEST)
- Postal code: 6070
- Area code: (+36) 76
- Website: www.izsak.hu

Izsák is a town in Bács-Kiskun county, Hungary.

== Famous residents ==
- Béla Kiss (28 July 1877 – 5 February 1915), Hungarian serial killer

== Twin towns – sister cities ==
Izsák is twinned with:

- Strullendorf, Germany
