= Baba Anujka =

Romanian serial killer

- Баба Анујка
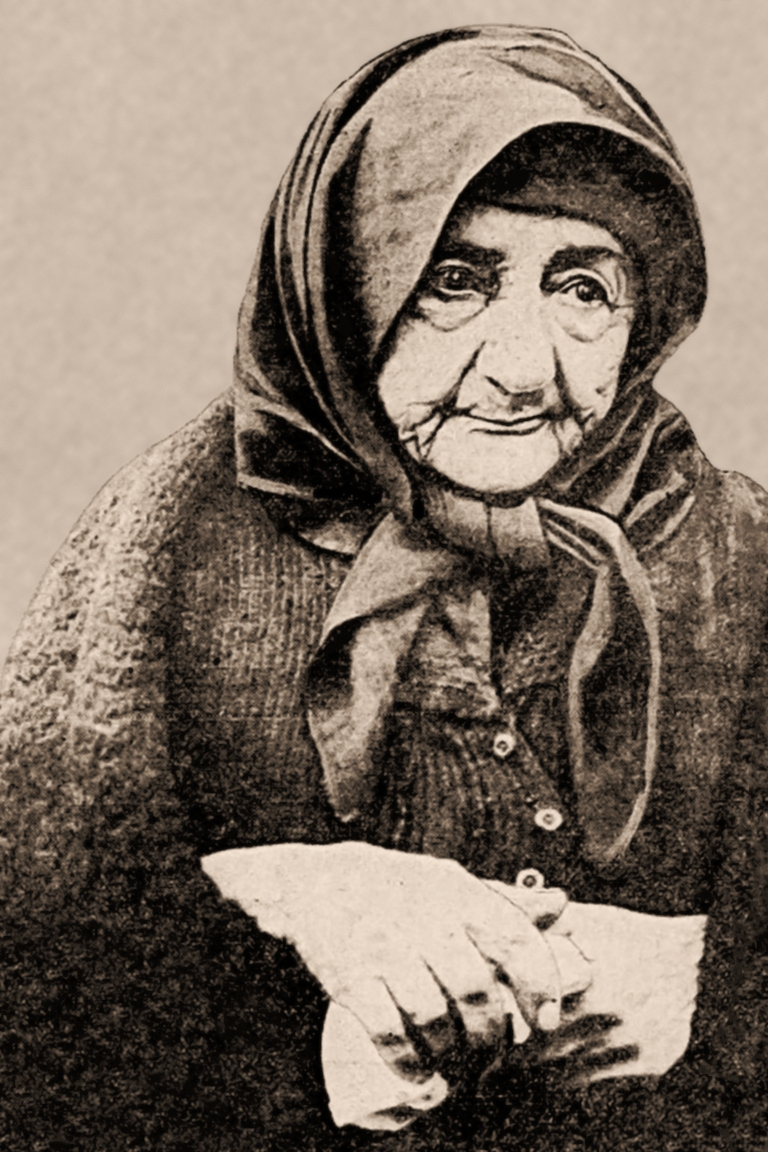
- Baba Anujka during the 1929 trial
- Born: Ana Drakšin; 1 July 1838; Romania
- Died: 1 September 1938 (aged 100); Vladimirovac, Yugoslavia
- Other names: The Banat Witch; The Witch of Vladimirovac
- Status: Deceased
- Conviction: Murder
- Penalty: 15 years imprisonment with hard labour

Details
- Victims: 50–150
- Country: Kingdom of Yugoslavia
- Date apprehended: June 1928

Ana di Pištonja, (Note: Also known as Anna Pistova, Anujka de Poshtonja, or Anyuka Dee in English sources, and Anuica di Piștonea in Romanian sources, and nicknamed by the media the Banat Witch, The Witch of Vladimirovac, and Little Mother Anjuschka.) (née Drakšin or Draxin) better known as Baba Anujka, (Note: "Baba" means "grandmother" in Serbo-Croatian, while "Anujka" (Anuica) is the Romanian diminutive form of the name Ana. "Baba Anujka" translates literally to "Grandmother Annie".) (Serbian Cyrillic: Баба Анујка; 1 July 1838 – 1 September 1938) was a Serbo-Romanian convicted serial killer and amateur chemist from the village of Vladimirovac, which was during her life part of the Austrian Empire, Austria-Hungary and eventually Yugoslavia. She poisoned at least 50 people and possibly as many as 150 in the late 19th and early 20th centuries. She was apprehended in 1928 at age 90 and sentenced to 15 years in prison in 1929 as an accomplice in two murders. She was released due to old age after spending eight years in prison.

== Early life and marriage ==
Data is scarce and unreliable about Anujka's early life. According to some sources, she was born in 1838 in Romania (which at the time was actually the Principality of Wallachia, the Principality of Moldavia, and might also be referring to some other areas then in the Austrian Empire) to a rich cattleman and moved to Vladimirovac in the Banat Military Frontier province of the Austrian Empire around 1849. However, she claimed that she was born in 1836. She attended private school in Pančevo with children from rich families, and later lived in her father's house. She allegedly became a misanthropist at age 20 after being seduced by a young Austrian military officer; she contracted syphilis from him before he left her broken-hearted. After that, she sought seclusion and started to show interest in medicine and chemistry. She spoke five languages. She later married a landowner named Pistov or di Pištonja with whom she had 11 children, only one of whom survived to adulthood. Her husband was much older than she, and died after 20 years of marriage. She continued to pursue her chemistry studies after his death.

== Experiments in herbalism ==
Anujka made a laboratory in one wing of her house after her husband died, and she earned a reputation as a healer and herbalist in the late 19th century. She was popular with wives of farmers who sought her help for health problems, and she earned a respectable income which enabled her to live comfortably. She produced medicines and mixtures which would make soldiers ill enough to escape military service, and she also sold poisonous mixtures which she branded "magic water" or "love potions". She sold the so-called "magic water" mostly to married women; they would give the concoction to their husbands, who would usually die after about eight days.

Anujka's "love potion" contained arsenic in small quantities and certain plant toxins that were difficult to detect. When told about a marriage problem, Anujka would ask her client, "How heavy is that problem?", which meant, "What does he weigh?" She was then able to calculate the dose needed. Anujka's victims were usually men, typically young and healthy. Her clients claimed at her trial that they did not know that her "magic water" contained poison, but that they believed that she had some kind of supernatural powers to kill people using magic. Anujka's potions killed between 50 and 150 people.

In the 1920s, Anujka had her own "sales agent", a woman named Ljubina Milankov, whose job was to find potential clients and take them to Anujka's house. The price of Anujka's "magic water" fluctuated between 2,000 and 10,000 Yugoslav dinars.

== Momirov murders ==
Anujka sold her "magic water" to Stana Momirov in January 1924 for 2,300 dinars. Stana was a previous client and Anujka had provided her with herbal medicines on other occasions. Stana gave the mixture to her husband Lazar Ludoški, and he fell ill and died after a few days. Stana later married another man from the same village. A rich uncle of her second husband died under similar circumstances within a few months. The police questioned Stana, and she incriminated Anujka.

Anujka then sold her magic water in December 1926 to Sima Momirov and his wife Sofija, who intended to kill Sima's 70-year-old father, Nikola Momirov. Their motive involved a family quarrel. According to their claim, Nikola was an alcoholic and abusive towards his children and grandchildren. Sofija heard about Anujka from a woman named Danica Stojić (or Stajić), and they contacted Anujka who sold them her magic water for 5,000 dinars. Sofija gave it to 16-year-old Olga Sturza, Nikola's granddaughter, and ordered her to ensure that Nikola drank it. Nikola drank the potion, fell ill, and died after 15 days.

== Trials ==
Anujka's first trial was in June 1914 in Bela Crkva for providing poison for murders, but she was acquitted. She was arrested again on 15 May 1928 at age 90. Stana, Sofija, and Sima Momirov, Ljubina Milankov, Danica Stojić and Olga Sturza were arrested as well and charged with the murders of Nikola Momirov and Lazar Ludoški. The authorities exhumed the bodies of the victims for autopsies performed at the University of Belgrade.

The trial began in June 1929 at the District Court in Pančevo, and the hearings took place on 18 and 19 June. The trial continued on 1 July when results were available from chemical testing of samples found in Anujka's house, at which time the prosecutor and defence attorneys gave closing statements. The prosecutor sought the death penalty for all defendants except Sturza, who was a minor at the time of the murder and for whom he sought a prison sentence.

Sofija and Sima Momirov defended themselves at the trial. They claimed that they didn't know that the "magic water" contained poison; they believed that it was just water and that the death came as a result of Anujka's supernatural powers. Stana Momirov claimed that she only wanted the magic water to heal her husband from alcoholism and that she was not aware that it would kill him. During the trial, Anujka constantly denied charges, claiming that she never sold any magic water and that the whole case against her was fabricated by Ljubina Milankov, who wanted to blame Anujka for her own crimes. Sturza defended herself, claiming that she was still a child at the time of the murder and that she was not aware that the water would kill her grandfather; but Sofija testified that Sturza was well aware of the whole plot. Dr. Branko Vurdelja, expert witness, testified that traces of arsenic were found in the bodies of both victims.

The verdict was delivered on 6 July 1929. Anujka was sentenced to 15 years in prison for the role of accomplice in both murders. Stana and Sofija Momirov were sentenced to life in prison as the main perpetrators. Sima Momirov was sentenced to 15 years, and Ljubina Milankov to 8 years. Olga Sturza and Danica Stojić were acquitted.

=== Appeal ===
Both the prosecutor and the defendants appealed the verdict to the Appellate Court in Novi Sad, and that trial took place on 29 and 30 November 1929. The prosecutor demanded capital punishment for all defendants. After some cross-examination, Sima and Sofija Momirov admitted that they knew about the poison from the start, but all defendants stood by their previous statements otherwise. The verdict was delivered on 30 November 1929. Anujka was re-sentenced to 15 years in prison with hard labour, and Stana and Sofija Momirov were re-sentenced to life in prison. Sima Momirov's sentence was increased from 15 years to life, and Ljubina Milankov's sentence was increased from 8 to 10 years. Sturza and Stojić were again acquitted.

Anujka then appealed to the Court of cassation in Novi Sad. The trial at the Court of cassation was held on 5 March 1930, and the court upheld Anujka's sentence.

=== Sentence ===
Anujka spent her sentence in the women's prison in Požarevac. She was visited there in May 1934 by a group of law students and journalists. She was held in the prison hospital at that time.

She was released from prison in 1936 due to old age, after spending 8 years there. When visited by journalists after her release, Anujka maintained innocence and denied participating in poisonings. She died two years later in her house in Vladimirovac, on 1 September 1938, at the age of 100.

== See also ==
- Angel Makers of Nagyrév
- List of serial killers by country
- List of serial killers before 1900
- Maria Swanenburg
