= White Terror (Hungary) =

1919–1921 repressive period in Hungary

- Part of Revolutions and interventions in Hungary (1918–1920) and Hungary in the interwar period
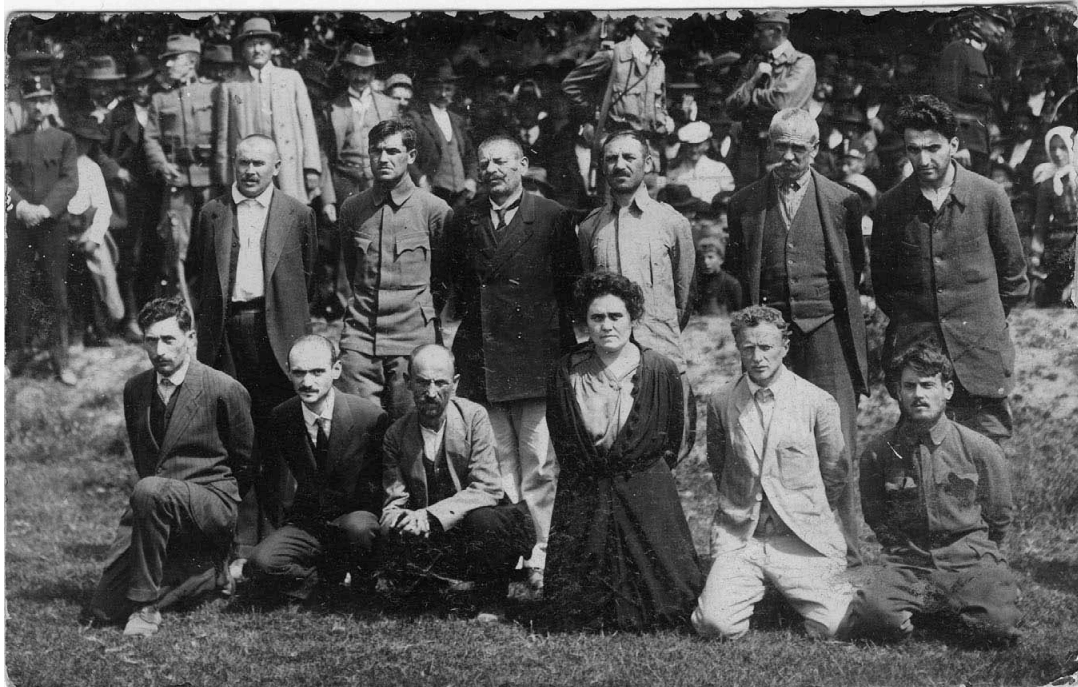
- Political prisoners in Transdanubia before execution
- Native name: Fehér Terror
- Time: 1919–1921
- Perpetrators: National army of Hungary, Hungarian Republic
- Deaths: 1,500–6,000

The White Terror (Hungarian: Fehér Terror) was a two-year period (1919–1921) of repressive violence in Hungary carried out by counter-revolutionary soldiers against the real and alleged supporters of the short-lived Hungarian Soviet Republic and its Red Terror, especially against the Jews perceived as its main supporters. Tens of thousands were imprisoned without trial. Estimates for the number murdered between 1919 and 1921 range from 1,500 to 6,000. Assuming all Jews were traitors and communists, far-right militias robbed and massacred them.

== Background ==
At the end of World War I, the political configuration of the Hungarian state was forced into swift and radical change. The Austro-Hungarian Empire, of which Hungary had been a powerful member, collapsed. The victorious Entente powers took steps to carve out Hungary's ethnically mixed border regions and grant them to the Kingdom of Serbs, Croats and Slovenes, Czechoslovakia, and Romania – efforts which resulted in Hungary's losing two thirds of its land area and one third of its Hungarian-speaking nationals. These losses, together with the postwar socioeconomic upheaval, catalysed deep feelings of humiliation and resentment among many Hungarians.

In this volatile atmosphere, the nation's fledgling efforts to form a single stable government failed. In March 1919, a government of communists, taking over from a Social Democrat-Communist coalition, established the Hungarian Soviet Republic. The Party of Communists in Hungary, led by Béla Kun, had the most influence in the republic, although the government was ostensibly led by the Social Democratic-Communist coalition. Kun's government lasted less than four months, eventually ending upon the Romanian invasion. During this period, heightened political tension and suppression led to arrests and executions in what came to be known as the Red Terror. This led to a decline in support for the government. Hungary attempted to retain Slovakia and Transylvania, but Romanian troops invaded Hungary, eventually reaching Budapest in August 1919. Upon the invasion, most Hungarian communists, including Kun, went into exile.

== First phase (1919) ==
In the south of the country, an alternative government was formed to replace the Hungarian Soviet Republic. Leading the armed wing of this new government, the "National Army", was Admiral Miklós Horthy, the last commander of the erstwhile Austro-Hungarian Navy.

Among the officers who answered Horthy's call were ultra-nationalist soldiers who mounted a campaign of atrocities in a retaliation to the Red Terror; to eliminate communist supporters and frighten the population into obedience to the new order.

The pogroms and mass murders were carried out by units of the "National Army" commanded by Mihály Horthy; paramilitary organisations also committed killings, especially during the "Hungarian Awakening".

These units, commonly known as the "White Guard," carried out a campaign of murder, torture, and humiliation. Summary executions of people suspected of communist allegiance were common; these victims were often hanged in public places to serve as a warning to others. But the White Guard's definition of who was an enemy of the state was a broad one. They also preyed upon peasants, upon the politically liberal, and very often upon Jews, who were broadly blamed for the revolution because most leaders of the communist repression had been Jewish.

The most notorious of unit commanders was Pál Prónay, whose battalion engaged in sadistic violence against its enemies. Others included Gyula Ostenburg-Moravek, Anton Lehár, and Iván Héjjas, who focused his efforts on the Hungarian plain around the town of Kecskémet. Their detachments were part of the National Army, but tended to function as personal battalions, following a fanatical loyalty to their commanders. Their atrocities included torture, rape, summary execution, and desecration of the corpses for public display.

Hardest hit were the regions of Transdanubia, the wider area of Horthy's headquarters in Siófok, and in the lowlands between the Danube and the Theiss rivers, where mass murders which aroused international attention were committed in Kecskémet and Orgovány.

== Second phase (post-1919) ==
The National Army invaded Budapest in November 1919, and four months later Horthy became Regent of the newly established Kingdom of Hungary. But, far from discontinuing their campaigns, the reactionary units expanded and continued terrorising their targets for almost two more years; politically motivated violence devolved into grudge-murders and kidnappings for profit. White Guard officers began to vie for power among themselves and plotted one another's assassinations. Horthy's biographer, Thomas L. Sakmyster, concluded that Horthy looked the other way in 1919 while the White Guard officers raged through the countryside.

== End of the White Terror ==
By 1920, the terror had receded noticeably. In 1921, Pál Prónay was prosecuted for crimes related to the White Terror. After Prónay joined a failed attempt to restore the Habsburg king, Charles I of Austria to Hungary's throne, his battalion was disbanded.

Despite the disbandment of the Prónay battalion, in subsequent years, sporadic attacks occurred.

== See also ==
- Red Terror (Hungary)
- Revolutions and interventions in Hungary (1918–1920)
