= Pál Prónay =

Hungarian reactionary and commander (1874–1947/48)

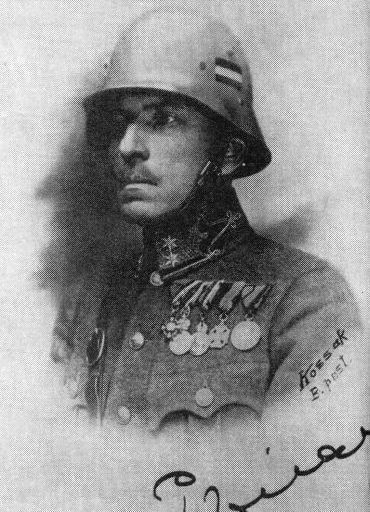
- Pál Prónay, commander during the White Terror in Hungary. His name is synonymous with the cruelty and lawlessness after the failed Communist coup d'état.
- Born: Pál Prónay de Tótpróna et Blatnicza; November 2, 1874; Romhány, Austria-Hungary
- Died: 1947 or 1948 (aged 72/73/74); Soviet Union

Pál Prónay de Tótpróna et Blatnicza (November 2, 1874 – 1947 or 1948) was a Hungarian reactionary and paramilitary commander in the years following the First World War. He is considered to have been the most brutal of the Hungarian National Army officers who led the White Terror that followed Hungary's brief 1919 Communist coup d'état.

== Background ==
Prónay was born in 1874 to an old and distinguished aristocratic family in the town of Romhány, Nógrád County, in northern Hungary. He attended the Lahne Military Institute, but advanced slowly in his officer's career, in part because he was abusive and violent toward his own men.

The Hungarian people considered themselves humiliated and dismembered by the victors of the First World War. The Allies stripped away two-thirds of the nation's territory and awarded them to Hungary's neighbors. With the lands went one-third of the country's Hungarian-speaking nationals.

Humiliation was inflamed by political instability. The first post-war attempt at a democratic government, under prime minister Mihály Károlyi, floundered and was overthrown in March 1919 by a Communist coup. Its leader, Béla Kun, had Jewish roots and Soviet training. Popular at first, Kun's so-called Hungarian Soviet Republic quickly lost the approval of the people, principally because of its failed economic policies, its inept military efforts to reclaim lost Hungarian lands from Czechoslovakia and Romania, and the Red Terror, in which Bolshevik-style gangs of young leather-clad thugs beat and murdered hundreds of the regime's “bourgeois” or counter-revolutionary opponents.

== National Army ==
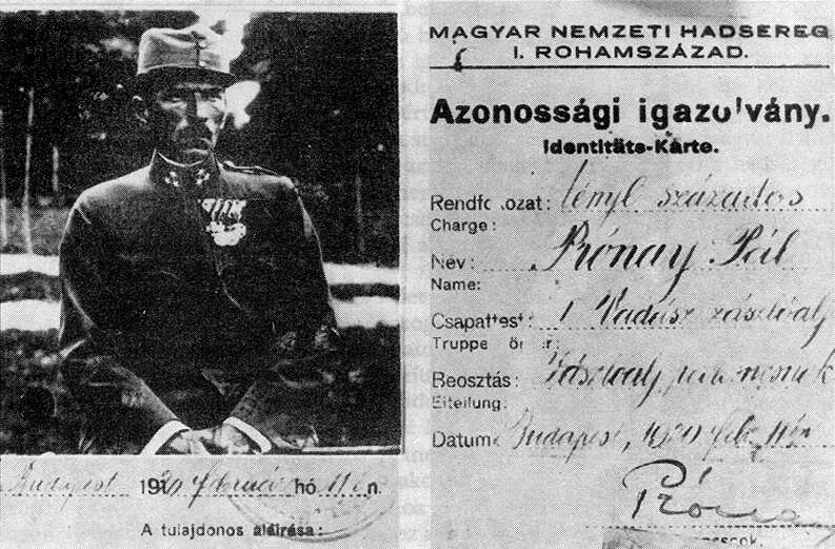
Prónay's military identity card

An alternative government struggled to form in the south of Hungary and secure the approval of the Allied powers; military affairs were placed in the hands of the former commander of the Austro-Hungarian fleet, Admiral Miklos Horthy, who forged a counter-revolutionary force and called it the National Army.

After Kun's coup d'état, Prónay considered emigrating, but instead he traveled to Szeged in the south, where he joined Horthy, taking command of the admiral's bodyguards. He was one of the first officers to join Horthy. He also began a close association with Gyula Gömbös, the right-wing politician and future prime minister.

In the summer of 1919, Prónay formed the first partisan militia of what would later be called the “White Guard.” As the National Army moved through the countryside and gathered momentum, Prónay and other officers began a two-year campaign of anti-Communist reprisals which are now known as the White Terror. Their goals were to exact revenge for the Communists’ transgressions – and to frighten a restless and volatile population into submitting to the counter-revolutionary government's control. Prónay also sought to “restore the traditional good relations between the landlords and estate servants,” which in essence meant enforcing obedience by the Hungarian servant class.

== The White Terror ==
Prónay's name is essentially synonymous with the cruelty of the worst White Terror reprisals. He selected his targets from among Communists, Social Democrats (Hungary's second Marxist political party), peasants, and Jews, whom many in the National Army blamed wholesale for the failed and bloody Communist coup d'état because 55–75% of its leaders were Jewish. Unlike some agents of terror, Prónay never saw any need to disguise or mitigate his acts of torture and humiliation, and in his later writings, he described them with undimmed relish. His unit kidnapped and blackmailed Jewish merchants and hacked off the breasts of peasant and Jewish women. They slashed off the ears of their victims to keep as trophies, and fed the boiler of the battalion's armored train with the bodies of their prisoners, some of them alive.

Prónay and his men liked to bring a demonic creativity to their humiliations. They sprinkled powdered sugar onto the battered and swollen faces of the men they bludgeoned, so as to attract hundreds of flies; they fastened leashes of string to their prisoners’ genitals and then whipped them to run in circles; and they tied their victims into stables and forced them to eat hay.

Although technically soldiers in the National Army, Prónay's men did not follow the standard chain of command. Prónay demanded, and received, suicidal loyalty to himself; soldiers were expected to follow the most brutal orders without hesitation, and those who had no stomach for these activities were expunged from the unit.

The Soviet Republic collapsed in August 1919, as the invading Romanian army (supported by French occupational troops) reached the Hungarian capital, Budapest. Kun and his allies fled, and the White Terror intensified.

The savagery of the White Terror cannot be blamed on Prónay alone. Other commanders, notably Iván Héjjas, Gyula Ostenburg-Moravek and Anton Lehár, led similar squadrons and committed similar brutalities. But Prónay seems to have outdone these colleagues in both fanaticism and cruelty.

In November 1919, Romanian troops withdrew. When Horthy and the National Army consolidated their control over the capital and the nation, Prónay installed his unit in Hotel Britannia, where the group grew to battalion level. The program of vicious attacks continued; their plan included a citywide pogrom until Horthy put a stop to it. In his diary, Prónay reported that Horthy

"...reproached me for the many Jewish corpses found in the various parts of the country, especially in the Transdanubia. This, he emphasized, gave the foreign press extra ammunitions against us. He told me that we should stop harassing small Jews; instead, we should kill some big Jews such as Somogyi or Vazsonyi – these people deserve punishment much more… in vain, I tried to convince him that the liberal papers would be against us anyway, and it did not matter that we killed only one Jew or we killed them all.."

== End of Prónay's career ==
After the establishment of the Kingdom of Hungary, the terror continued. But tolerance for the reactionary violence was waning in the corridors of power. The White Guard units, particularly Prónay's, were increasingly difficult to control, behaving less like army units and more like self-serving renegade gangs. Their savagery was outraging Hungary's upper class, and drawing negative international press; it may also have hardened the feelings of the Allied powers toward Hungary at a crucial moment, just before the ratification of the Trianon Treaty.

Nevertheless, it was at least another year before the terror died down. In the summer of 1920, Horthy's government took measures to rein in and eventually disperse the reactionary battalions. Prónay managed to undermine these anti-White Guard measures, but only for a short time.

After Prónay's men were implicated in the murder of a Budapest policeman in November 1920, his bosses' permissiveness declined sharply. The following summer, Pronay was put on trial for extorting a wealthy Jewish politician, and for “insulting the President of the Parliament” by trying to cover up the extortion. Found guilty on both charges, Prónay was now a liability and an embarrassment. His command was revoked, and he was denounced as a common criminal on the floor of the Hungarian parliament.

After serving short sentences, Prónay tried to convince Horthy to restore his battalion command. The regent turned him down. Furious with his former patron, whom he now condemned as a useless windbag, Prónay moved to the Austrian border, where he continued his atrocities, and proclaimed himself Supreme Leader of a buffer state, the Banat of Leitha. Finally, in the fall of 1921, Prónay joined in the second failed attempt to oust Horthy and restore the Habsburg Charles IV, to the throne. Horthy at last permanently severed his ties with Prónay.

The Prónay Battalion lingered for a few months more under the command of a junior officer, but the government officially dissolved the unit in January 1922 and expelled its members from the army.

Prónay entered politics as a member of the government's right-wing opposition. In the 1930s, he sought and failed to emulate the Nazis by generating a Hungarian fascist mass movement. In 1932, he was charged with incitement, sentenced to six months in prison and stripped of his rank of lieutenant colonel.

In October 1944, as Budapest descended into chaos at the end of the Second World War, 69-year-old Prónay assembled a death squad and resumed his hunt for Hungarian Jews. He vanished in the war's final weeks, and was formerly believed to have fallen during the siege of Budapest. The opening of the Soviet archives revealed that Prónay was captured on 20 March 1945, held as a POW, sentenced by the Soviet authorities to twenty years forced labour on charges of sabotage and espionage, and died in the Gulag in either 1947 or 1948.

== Awards and decorations ==

| 1st row | Military Merit Cross (Austria-Hungary) 3rd class with war decoration and swords | Silver Military Merit Medal on war ribbon with swords | Bronze Military Merit Medal on war ribbon with swords | Karl Troop Cross |
| 2nd row | Wound Medal (Austria-Hungary) | Hungarian World War I Commemorative Medal | | |

== Sources ==
- Magyar életrajzi lexikon (in Hungarian)

Written by Pál Prónay

Bodó und Fogarassy: Original diary in the archive of the National Security Service in Budapest, very difficult access for scholars. Text selected by Prónay for the public in the 1930s and 1940s.

1. volume: lost

Accessible: written with the typewriter and handwritten additions und photo-illustrations.

2. volume: End of Oktober 1918 bis August 31, 1922

3. volume: Subsequently, until the end of 1922

4. volume: Fogarassy supposes existence, but never found.

Accessible for the public:

Selection of his memoirs Pál Prónay, A hatában a Halál kaszál (übersetzt mit "Death mows at the border"), with preface and notes of Agnes Szabó and Ervin Pamlényi, Budapest 1963, especially about the White Terror

Short English selections: Béla Bodó, Prónay, The Carl Beck Papers in Russian and East European Studies, Nr. 2101, Pittsburgh 2011, S. 1 ff im gesamten Text verteilt

German summary of his texts about the Lajtabánság: Lászlo Fogarassy, Paul Prónays Erinnerungen an das 'Lajta-Banat', in: Burgenländische Heimatblätter, 52. Jahrgang, Heft 1, Eisenstadt 1990

About Pál Prónay

Béla Bodó, Prónay, The Carl Beck Papers in Russian and East European Studies, Nr. 2101, Pittsburgh 2011

Lászlo Fogarassy, Paul Prónays Erinnerungen an das 'Lajta-Banat', in: Burgenländische Heimatblätter, 52. Jahrgang, Heft 1, Eisenstadt 1990
