= Orgovány =

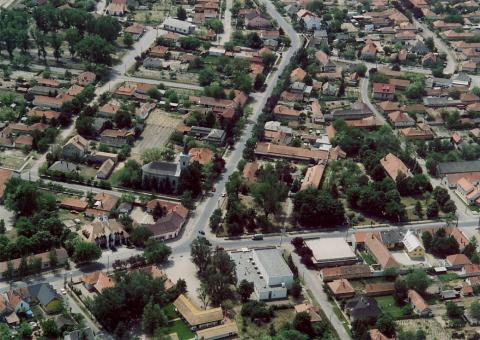
- Aerial photograph of Orgovány

- Location within Hungary
- Coordinates: 46°45′N 19°28′E
- Country: Hungary
- County: Bács-Kiskun

Area
  - Total: 99.19 km^{2} (38.30 sq mi)

Population (2015)
  - Total: 3,368
  - Density: 34/km^{2} (88/sq mi)
- Time zone: UTC+1 (CET)
  - Summer (DST): UTC+2 (CEST)
- Postal code: 6077
- Area code: 76

Orgovány is a village in Bács-Kiskun county, in the Southern Great Plain region of southern Hungary.

== Geography ==
It covers an area of 99.19 km^{2} (38 sq mi) and had a population of 3,368 in 2015.
