= Rotenturm an der Pinka =

- Municipality
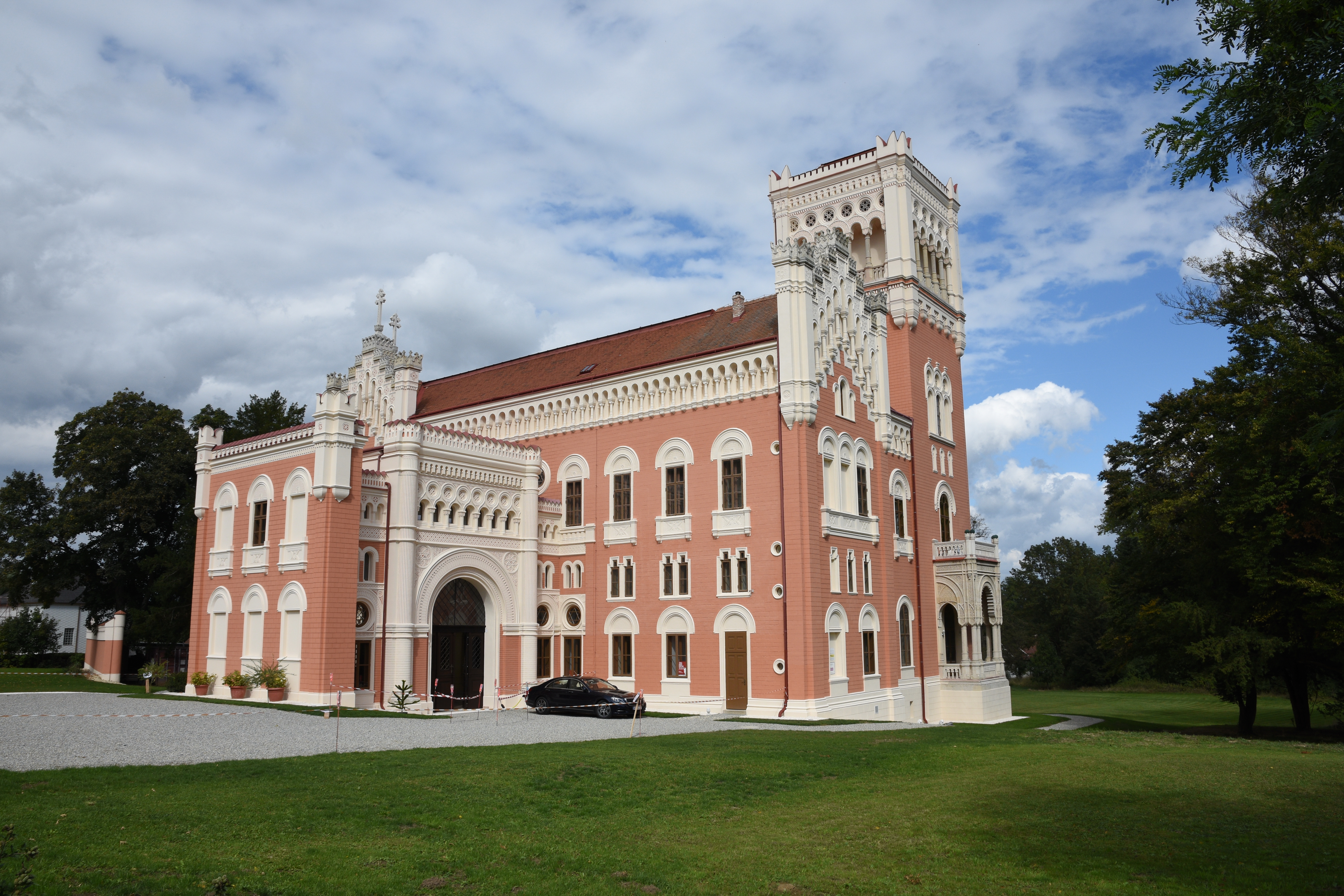
- Rotenturm Castle

- Coat of arms

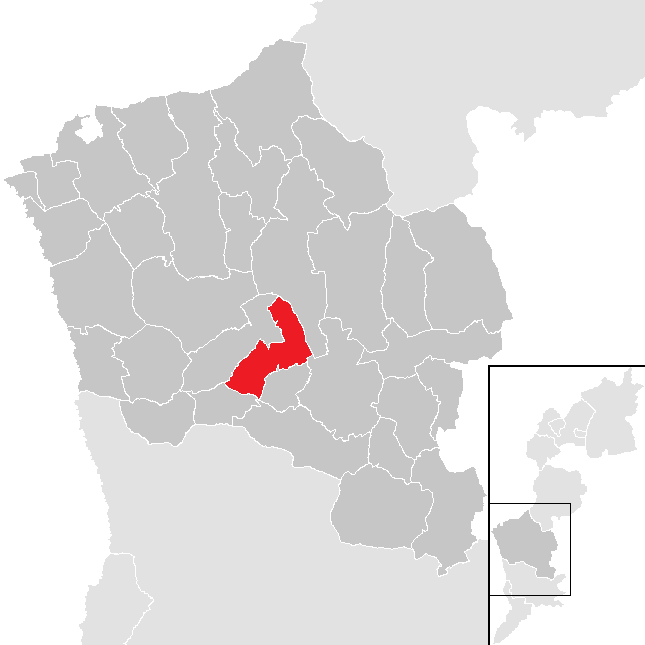
- Location within Oberwart district

- Location within Austria
- Coordinates: 47°15′N 16°15′E
- Country: Austria
- State: Burgenland
- District: Oberwart

Government
  - Mayor: Josef Halper (since 2017) (SPÖ)

Area
  - Total: 17.04 km^{2} (6.58 sq mi)
- Elevation: 295 m (968 ft)

Population (2024)
  - Total: 1,455
  - Density: 85.39/km^{2} (221.2/sq mi)
- Time zone: UTC+1 (CET)
  - Summer (DST): UTC+2 (CEST)
- Postal code: 7501
- Area code: +43 3352

Rotenturm an der Pinka (Hungarian: Vasvörösvár, Croatian: Verešvar) is a municipality in the Austrian state of Burgenland on the banks of the Pinka River. Administratively the village belongs to the district of Oberwart. Rotenturm is almost merged with the neighbouring Unterwart. The small Hungarian-speaking village of Siget in der Wart (Őrisziget) is part of the municipality of Rotenturm an der Pinka.

The municipality's main sight is Schloss Rotenturm, a castle built for István Erdödy in 1860-1862 by Anton Weber.

== Population ==
Historical population
Year	Pop.	±%
1869	1,871	—
1880	1,928	+3.0%
1890	1,857	−3.7%
1900	1,754	−5.5%
1910	1,703	−2.9%
1923	1,673	−1.8%
1934	1,559	−6.8%
1939	1,409	−9.6%
1951	1,365	−3.1%
1961	1,342	−1.7%
1971	1,386	+3.3%
1981	1,457	+5.1%
1991	1,410	−3.2%
2001	1,378	−2.3%
2011	1,434	+4.1%
2016	1,436	+0.1%
2024	1,455	+1.3%
