= Upper Őrség =

Ethnographic region in Burgenland, Austria

Upper Őrség (Hungarian: Felső-Őrség, [ˈfɛlsøː ˈøːrʃeːɡ]; German: Wart) is a traditional ethnographic region and a small Hungarian language island in southern Burgenland, Austria. It consists of the town of Oberwart (Hun: Felsőőr) and the two villages of Unterwart (Hun: Alsóőr) and Siget in der Wart (Hun: Őrisziget). The population of the three settlements was 7694 according to the 2001 census, of whom 1922 people (25%) belonged to the ethnic Hungarian minority. The economic and cultural center of the microregion is Oberwart/Felsőőr.

== History ==
In the 11th century the region was part of the border zone (gyepű) of the Kingdom of Hungary. The mainly uninhabited frontier was defended by free border guard communities called őrök és lövők (guards and archers). In contemporary Latin documents they are called spiculatores and sagittarii. They were probably related to the border guards of the eastern frontier, the Székelys.

The descendants of the guards are still living in the villages of the Upper Őrség (and in the Lower Őrség or simply Őrség in present-day Hungary). The archers later assimilated into the German population. They lived around the villages of Alsólövő (now Unterschützen) and Felsölövő (now Oberschützen). There were also other border guard communities elsewhere.

In the early Middle Ages the gyepű became part of the county of Vas. Upper Őrség belonged to this county until 1921.

The community of the őrs were granted the privileges of nobility by King Charles I of Hungary at the beginning of the 14th century. They were free of serfdom and taxation. These privileges were acknowledged by Rudolph I in 1582.

Their nobility differentiated the őrs from the people of the neighbouring villages, and was important in the formation of their distinct identity. Some families kept track of their noble origins even in the 20th century. In the village of Alsóőr/Unterwart several families trace back their origin to medieval times, for example the Balikó, Balla, Benedek, Benkő, Deáki, Farkas, Gaál, Gangoly, Gyáki, Györög, Heritz, Kelemen, Leéb, Moór, Német, Paál, Palank, Seper, Szabó, Takács and Zarka families.

Upper Őrség became a language island in the 16th century. At that time the neighbouring territories were already populated with Germans. After the devastating Ottoman war in 1532 Croatian settlers arrived. The őrs became an isolated community in this new situation. They spoke their distinct dialect and practised strict endogamy until at least the middle of the 20th century.

The őrs took part in the Hungarian wars of independence against the Habsburgs in the Rákóczi Uprising (1703-1711) and in the Revolutionary war of 1848–49.

=== 20th century: decline ===
At the end of the 19th century the community began to dwindle, due to the decline of small crafts and the frittering away of the noble properties between the children. Several new Hungarian civil servants and intellectuals arrived in Felsőőr which was the centre of local government but the newcomers remained "strangers" to the original population. After the absorption into Austria in 1921 most of them left Burgenland.

After World War I a small German-speaking area in the west of Hungary was awarded to the Republic of Austria by the Treaty of Trianon. The people of Upper Őrség protested against the decision but their attempt to establish an independent micro-state (see Lajtabánság) failed.

As an ethnic minority the őrs tried to maintain their identity in the first decades of the new republic. After the Anschluss the policy of Germanization severely affected the ethnic minorities. Hungarian schools were closed and the use of native language strongly discouraged. During World War II the Hungarian population of Burgenland halved (in 1934 10,442 Hungarians lived in the province, in 1951 only 5251).

After World War II the remaining őrs were totally separated from the mother country by the Iron Curtain. In the 1960s Oberwart became a small industrial town with a German majority. Assimilation accelerated, although there were attempts to keep alive the sense of identity, for example by the formation of cultural groups and associations. The Reformed Church played an important part of this process, especially in Oberwart/Felsőőr. In 1976 the Hungarians were officially recognised as a minority group by the Austrian state. The Austrian policy against ethnic minorities changed very slowly in the last decades of the 20th century, but today minority rights are accepted.

After the democratic change in Hungary in 1989 and the accession to the EU in 2004 the remaining Hungarian population of the region had an opportunity to re-establish cultural and economic connections with Hungary.

== Language ==
The Hungarians of Upper Őrség have a distinct dialect, probably related to the Székelys of Transylvania. Typical phonetical differences compared to the standard Hungarian language:

- /ɟ/ becomes /dʒ/ for example the word gyerek (child) is pronounced as dzserek
- /c/ becomes /tʃ/ for example the word bátyám (uncle) is pronounced as bácsám
- /v/ becomes /b/ for example the word szarvas (deer) is pronounced as szarbas
- /n/ becomes /ɲ/ for example the word szappan (soap) is pronounced as szoppany
