= Siget in der Wart =

Coordinates: 47°16′N 16°17′E

Siget in der Wart or Őrisziget (German: Siget in der Wart; Hungarian: Őrisziget) is a small village in Burgenland, Austria, in the district of Oberwart (Hun: Felsőőr). The village lies on the banks of the Zicken Bach (Szék-patak) and administratively belongs to the neighbouring town of Rotenturm an der Pinka (Hun: Vasvörösvár). According to the 2001 census it had a population of 274. They are almost exclusively ethnic Hungarians. Siget/Őrisziget is part of the Upper Őrség or Wart microregion together with Oberwart (Hun: Felsőőr) and Unterwart (Hun: Alsóőr).

== History ==
The village was established in the early Middle Ages in the borderzone of the Kingdom of Hungary (gyepű). It was first mentioned in historical documents in 1352 under the name Zygeth ('sziget' means island in Hungarian). The population was made up of Hungarian frontier guards (őr), probably related to the Székelys of Transylvania. The guards constituted a free, privileged community. Őrisziget belonged to the old county of Vas until 1921.

In the 14th century the rights of the villagers were confirmed and they were ranked among the nobles. Sziget was placed under the protection of the town of Kőszeg (Güns) until 1441. Although later the guards lost their military significance, the noble őrs kept their privileges. They were confirmed again in the early 17th century by King Mátyás II of Hungary. Most of the village people converted to Lutheran faith in the Age of Reformation. In the end of the 19th century Őrisziget was famous for its knife-makers (their products were called őri bicska).

Historically, the settlement had a Hungarian population. According to the last Hungarian census in 1910 Őrisziget had a population of 333 people (exclusively Hungarians). The village was given to Austria according to the Treaty of Trianon in 1921. In the second half of the 20th century the population decreased. In 1991 only 272 people lived in Siget (82 percent ethnic Hungarians). The village remained a small, secluded agricultural community until the end of the 20th century. It was merged with Rotenturm an der Pinka (formerly Vasvörösvár) in 1971.

== Sights ==
- Church of St. Ladislaus

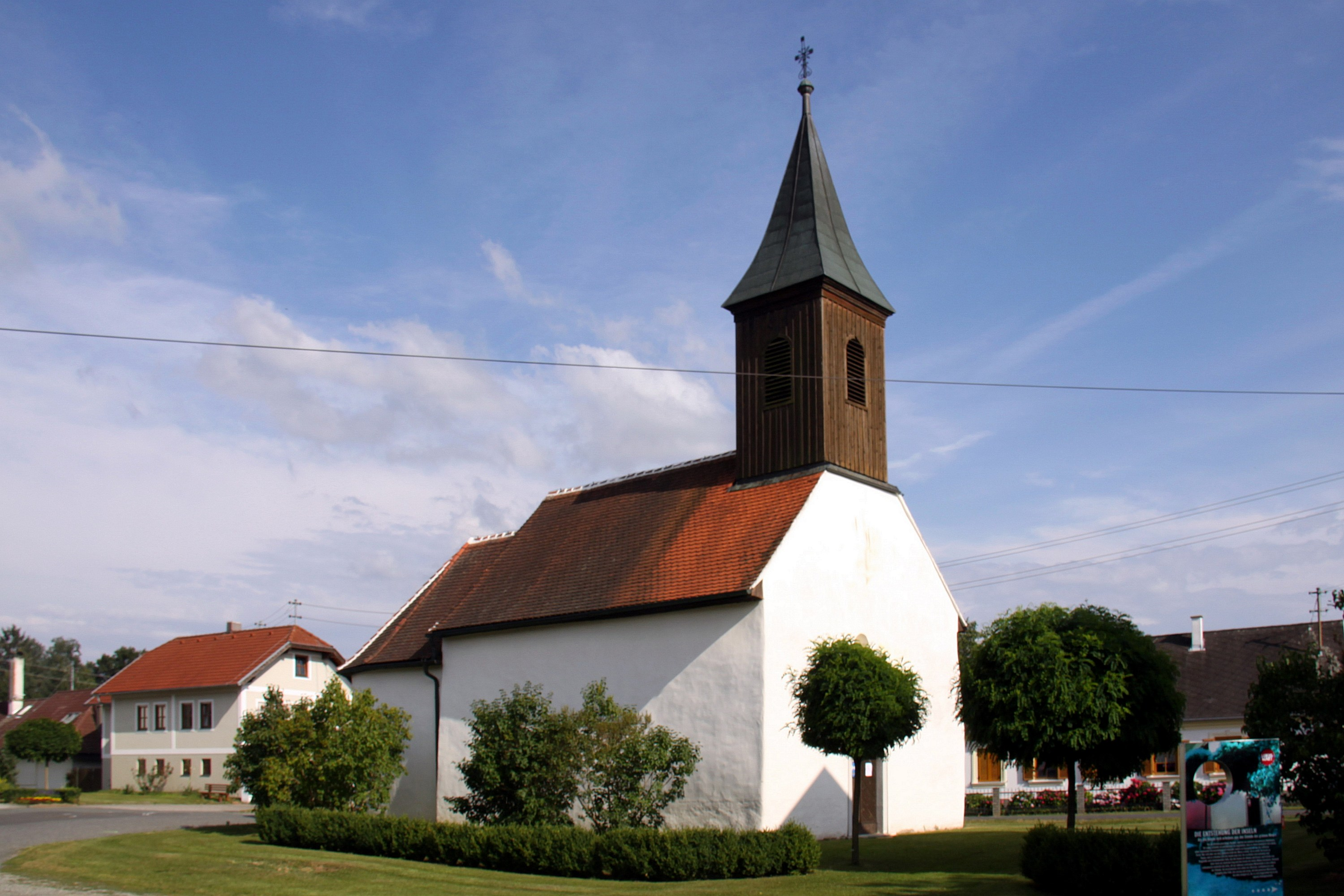
The Roman Catholic church

The Roman Catholic church named after King Ladislaus I of Hungary (Hun: Szent László) was built in the 13th century in Roman style. It was first mentioned in 1368. Later it was enlarged in the 16th century. In 1979 restoration revealed 16th century nonfigurative frescoes from the Age of Reformation. There is a wooden ceiling and gallery, and a stone pulpit (probably medieval). The 18th-century altar is decorated with a painting of Patrona Hungariae. The Virgin Mary is portrayed in old Hungarian attire.

- Lutheran Church

It was built in 1792–94 in late Baroque style. The bell tower is a later addition from 1820. There is a Hungarian inscription above the door: "Erős vár nékünk az Isten" (A Mighty Fortress Is Our God). The typical Lutheran altar-pulpit was made around 1800 for the Lutheran Church of Stadtschlaining (Városszalónak) but it was brought to Őrisziget twenty years later. The altar painting is a copy of Peter Paul Rubens: Golgotha.

- Lutheran Rectory

The Old Rectory (No. 53) behind the church was built in the second half of the 18th century. It is an interesting example of the local folk-architecture with an arched porch. The charter of the village given by King Mátyás II of Hungary is kept in the Rectory. The Old School from the 19th century was converted to a bilingual Magyar-German kindergarten.

- Old peasant houses

A lot of old peasant houses survived in the village, all typical examples of the folk-architecture of the Felső-Őrség in the 19th century. No.78 and 82. are particularly nice with arched porches.
