= List of Austrian states by Human Development Index =

Map of Austrian states by Human Development Index in 2017. Legend: > 0.930 0.920 – 0.930 0.900 – 0.920 0.890 – 0.900 < 0.890

This is a list of Austrian states by Human Development Index as of 2023.

Rank	State	HDI (2023)
Very high human development
1	Vienna	0.952
2	Salzburg	0.948
3	Tyrol	0.941
–	Austria	0.930
4	Styria	0.926
5	Upper Austria	0.921
5	Vorarlberg	0.920
7	Carinthia	0.916
8	Lower Austria	0.896
9	Burgenland	0.894

== Development 1995–2015 ==
Human Development Index of Austrian states since 1995.

Rank	State	HDI 1995	HDI 2000	HDI 2005	HDI 2010	HDI 2015	Improvement 1995–2015
1	Vienna	0.857	0.877	0.894	0.914	0.923	▲0.066
2	Salzburg	0.832	0.853	0.867	0.899	0.912	▲0.080
3	Tyrol	0.827	0.848	0.864	0.890	0.904	▲0.077
4	Styria	0.811	0.831	0.849	0.874	0.888	▲0.077
5	Upper Austria	0.804	0.824	0.841	0.869	0.882	▲0.078
6	Vorarlberg	0.802	0.822	0.840	0.866	0.881	▲0.079
7	Carinthia	0.803	0.823	0.847	0.870	0.877	▲0.074
8	Lower Austria	0.778	0.798	0.815	0.843	0.858	▲0.080
9	Burgenland	0.775	0.795	0.808	0.839	0.856	▲0.081
–	Austria (average)	0.816	0.837	0.853	0.880	0.893	▲0.077

== See also ==
- List of countries by Human Development Index
