= Centrope =

Multinational region in Central Europe

- Metropolitan region
- Centrope consists of regions that lie on either side of the northern and eastern borders of Austria
- Country: Austria; Slovakia; Czech Republic; Hungary
- Largest Cities: Vienna (1,931,593); Bratislava (475,503); Brno (401,000)

Area
  - Metro: 44,500 km^{2} (17,200 sq mi)

Population
  - Metro: 7,100,000
  - Metro density: 160/km^{2} (410/sq mi)
- Time zone: UTC+1 (CET)

Centrope is an Interreg IIIA project to establish a multinational region in four Central European states: Slovakia, Austria, Hungary and the Czech Republic. The population of Centrope is 7,450,270.

Centrope is a joint initiative of the Austrian federal states of Vienna, Lower Austria and Burgenland, the Czech region of South Moravia, the Slovak regions of Bratislava and Trnava, and the Hungarian counties of Győr-Moson-Sopron and Vas. On the basis of the Kittsee Declaration of 2003, they work jointly towards the creation of the Central European Region in this four-country quadrangle.

== Economy ==
In 2023 Centrope had a GDP of around €310 billion.

== See also ==
- Economy of Europe
