= Pinka =

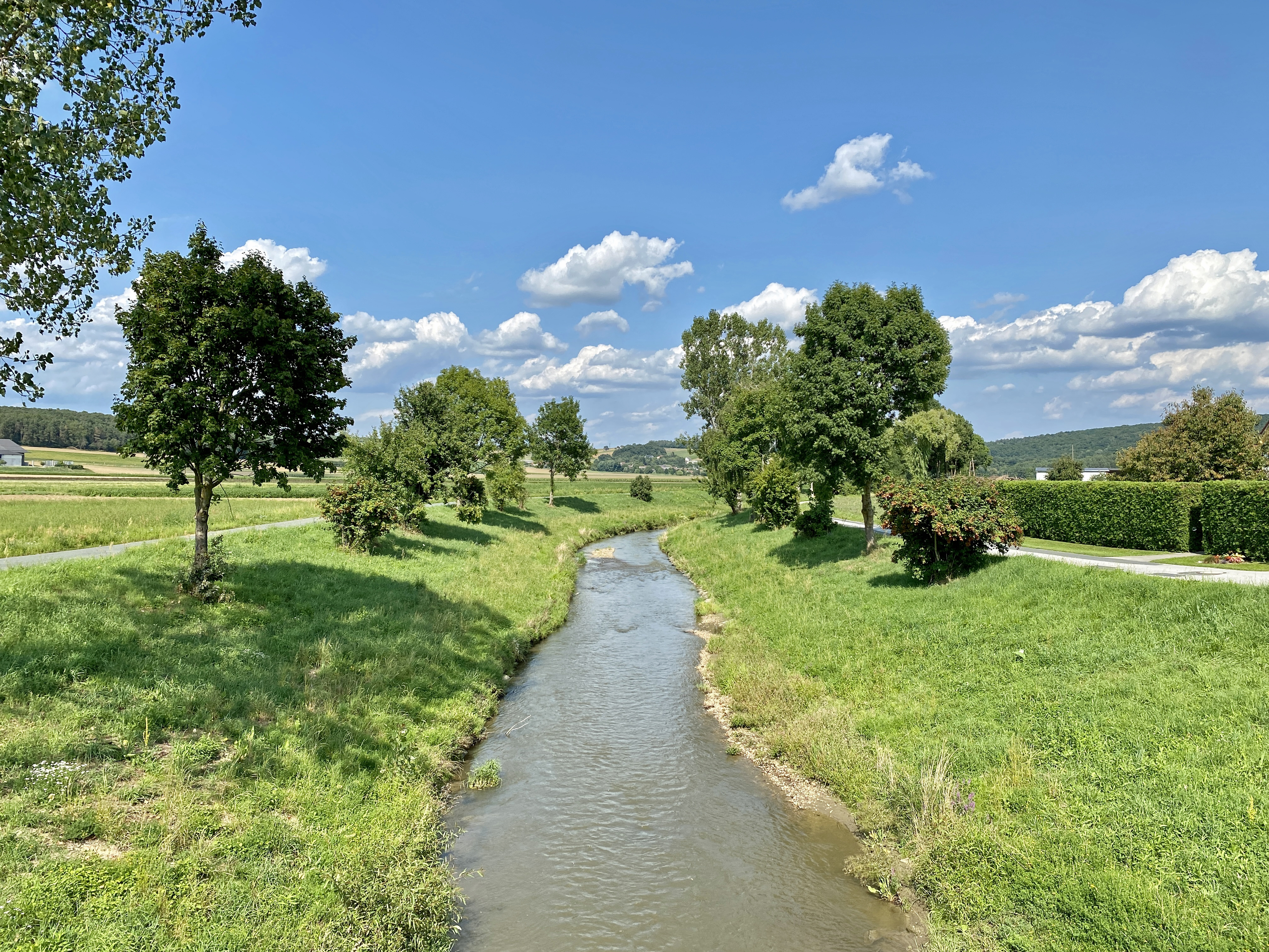

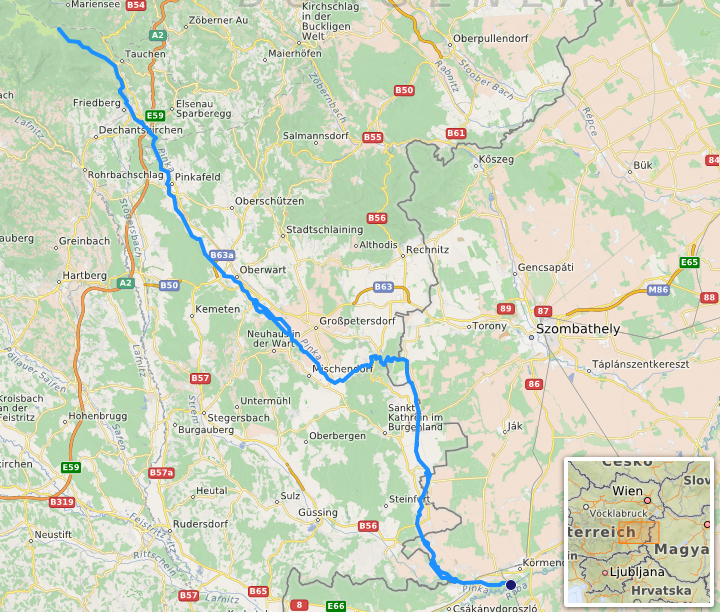

Location
- Countries: Austria and Hungary

Physical characteristics
- Mouth
  - location: Rába near Körmend
  - coordinates: 46.9991°N 16.5897°E
- Length: 99.8 km (62.0 mi)
- Basin size: 1,299 km^{2} (502 sq mi)

Basin features
- Progression: Rába→ Danube→ Black Sea

The Pinka (German pronunciation: [ˈpɪŋka]) is a river in Central Europe with a length of approximately 100 km (60 mi). Its basin area is 1,299 km^{2} (502 sq mi). Its source is located in Styria, eastern Austria, next to the provincial border of Burgenland. It passes into Hungary between the villages of Burg and Felsőcsatár, and crosses the Austrian-Hungarian border five times. Further, it flows into the Rába river, itself a tributary of the Danube, near Körmend. Its main tributaries are the Strem, the Zickenbach and the Tauchenbach.

Important towns on its course are Pinkafeld and Oberwart, as well as Pinggau, Riedlingsdorf, Rotenturm an der Pinka and Eberau in Austria and Horvátlövő, Pinkamindszent and Körmend in Hungary.

== Ecology ==
The river provides an important habitat to a number of different animal species, including the river trout, European bullhead, grey heron and mallard, as well as a variety of dragonflies. Otters have also been recorded along the river.
