= Sieggraben =

- Municipality
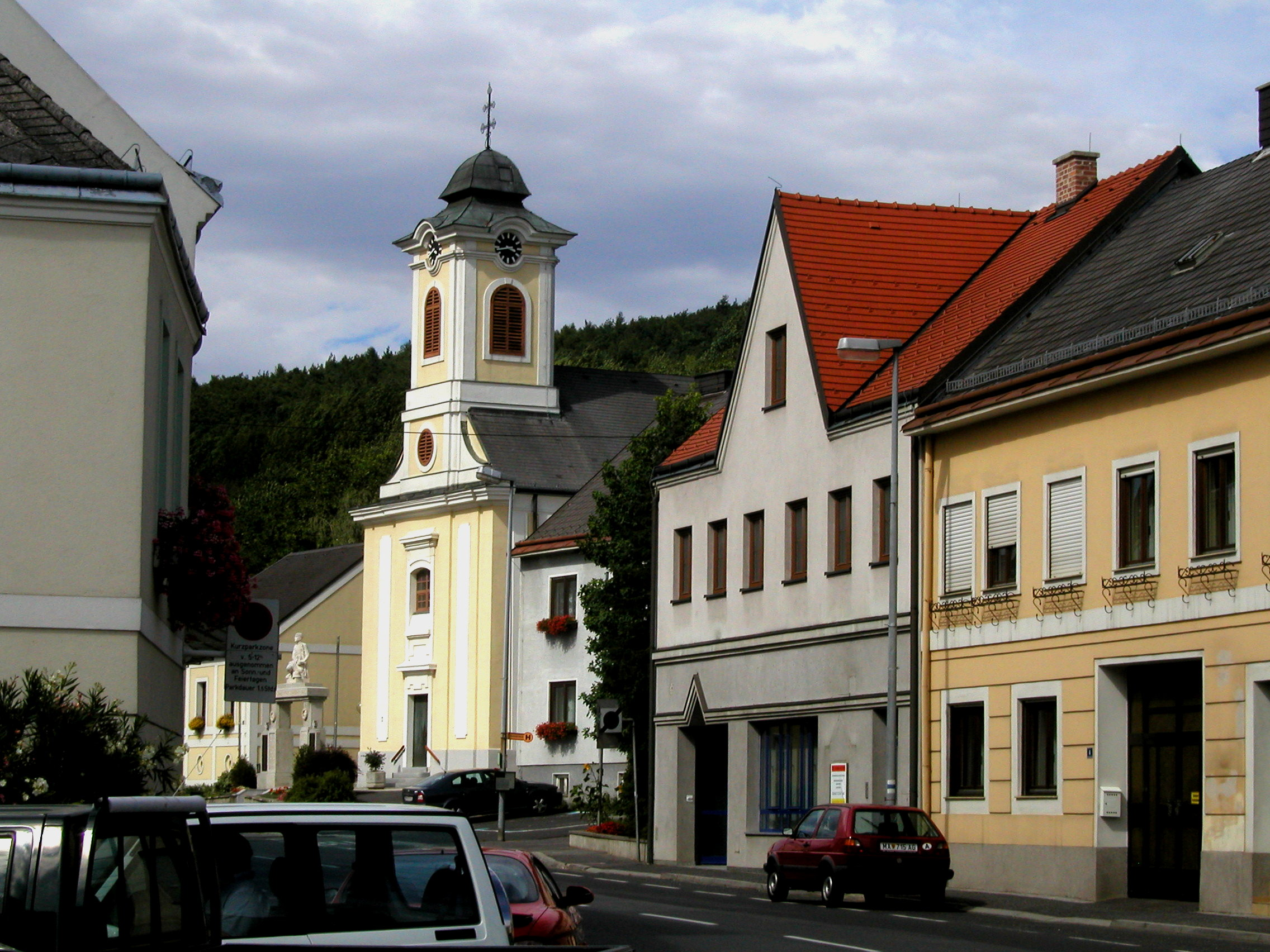
- Main street in Sieggraben

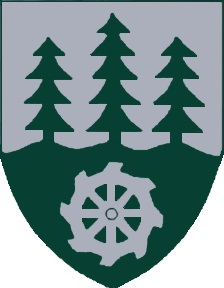
- Coat of arms

- Location within Austria Sieggraben (Austria)
- Coordinates: 47°39′N 16°23′E
- Country: Austria
- State: Burgenland
- District: Mattersburg

Government
  - Mayor: Andreas Gradwohl (SPÖ)

Area
  - Total: 17.7 km^{2} (6.8 sq mi)
- Elevation: 450 m (1,480 ft)

Population (2018-01-01)
  - Total: 1,248
  - Density: 70.5/km^{2} (183/sq mi)
- Time zone: UTC+1 (CET)
  - Summer (DST): UTC+2 (CEST)
- Postal code: 7223

Sieggraben (Croatian: Sigrob, Hungarian: Szikra) is a village in the district of Mattersburg in the Austrian state of Burgenland. It is the narrowest part of the state.

== Population ==
Historical population
Year	Pop.	±%
1869	729	—
1880	814	+11.7%
1890	792	−2.7%
1900	887	+12.0%
1910	964	+8.7%
1923	1,046	+8.5%
1934	1,227	+17.3%
1939	1,233	+0.5%
1951	1,276	+3.5%
1961	1,270	−0.5%
1971	1,288	+1.4%
1981	1,333	+3.5%
1991	1,393	+4.5%
2001	1,295	−7.0%
2011	1,279	−1.2%
