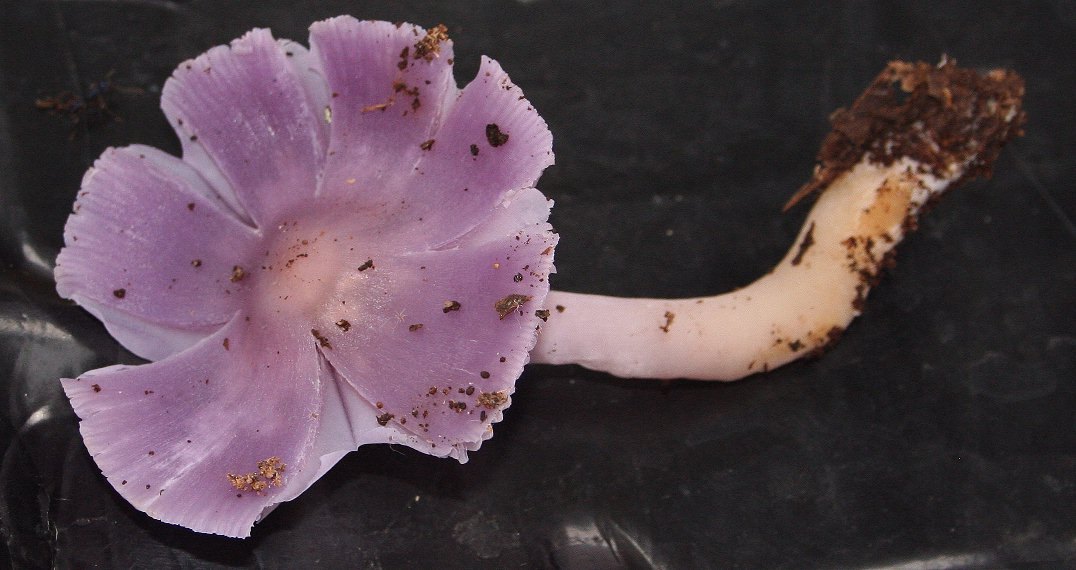
- Porpolomopsis lewelliniae Hazelbrook, New South Wales

Scientific classification
- Domain: Eukaryota
- Kingdom: Fungi
- Division: Basidiomycota
- Class: Agaricomycetes
- Order: Agaricales
- Family: Hygrophoraceae
- Genus: Porpolomopsis
- Species: P. lewelliniae

Binomial name
- Porpolomopsis lewelliniae (Kalchbr.) Lodge, Padamsee & S.A. Cantrell (2013)

Synonyms
- Hygrophorus lewellinae Kalchbr. (1883); Hygrocybe lewellinae (Kalchbr.) A. M. Young (1997); Humidicutis lewelliniae (Kalchbr.) A.M. Young (2005) Mycena rimosacuta Corner (1994)

= Porpolomopsis lewelliniae =

Species of fungus

Porpolomopsis lewelliniae Mycological characteristics
- Gills on hymenium
- Cap is umbonate
- Hymenium is adnexed
- Stipe is bare
- Spore print is white
- Ecology is saprotrophic
- Edibility is unknown

Porpolomopsis lewelliniae, commonly known as the mauve splitting wax-cap, is a gilled fungus of the waxcap family found in wet forests of eastern Australia and New Zealand. The small mauve- or lilac-coloured mushrooms are fairly common and appear in moss or leaf litter on the forest floor in autumn, and are biotrophic. The key distinguishing feature is the splitting of the cap dividing down the middle of the individual gills.

== Taxonomy ==
It was initially described as Hygrophorus lewelliniae by Hungarian mycologist Károly Kalchbrenner in 1882, and later as Hygrocybe lewelliniae by Brittlebank in 1940, before being placed in the genus Humidicutis by Australian mycologist Tony Young in 1997. Kalchbrenner named this species in honour of the collector of the type specimen, Madeline Lewellin. A molecular phylogenetics study found it to be more closely related to the type species of the genus Porpolomopsis, Porpolomopsis calyptriformis so it was transferred to Porpolomopsis. The original holotype specimen had been collected on 14 June 1880 in the vicinity of Western Port in Victoria by a Miss M.R. Lewellin and sent by Ferdinand von Mueller to Kalchbrenner in Budapest. It was likely destroyed in the First World War, although a watercolour of it by the collector survives and is located in the National Herbarium of Victoria. It has been compared with collections made by E. J. H. Corner of a Mycena rimosacuta in Borneo and found to be the same species. It may be that Humidicutis mavis is merely a white-coloured form of this species.

== Description ==
The mauve splitting waxcap is a small mushroom with an umbonate cap 3–6.5 centimetres (1 1/3–2 1/2 in) in diameter, initially conical and later flattening to almost flat. It is smooth and mauve or lilac in colour with a greyish boss. The cap is textured with radial fibres, along which it may split, with the gills dividing between the split. The lilac stipe is 3–7 cm (1 1/3–2 1/2 in) high and 0.4–0.8 cm thick and may be tinged yellow at the base. The lilac gills are adnexed or free, and thick or distant with even margins. The spore print is white and the hyaline spores are more or less oval, measuring around 5.5 x 9 μm.

== Distribution and habitat ==
Saprotrophic, this species is fairly common. Fruiting bodies appear in autumn and winter (March to August) with some records from October, in moss or among leaf litter in wet sclerophyll forest or rainforest in temperate, subtropical or tropical climates. It also appears in sandy areas. It has been recorded from southeastern Queensland, eastern New South Wales, Victoria and Tasmania, as well as New Zealand and from Mount Kinabalu in Sabah. Although not recorded from North Queensland, it is predicted to occur there.
