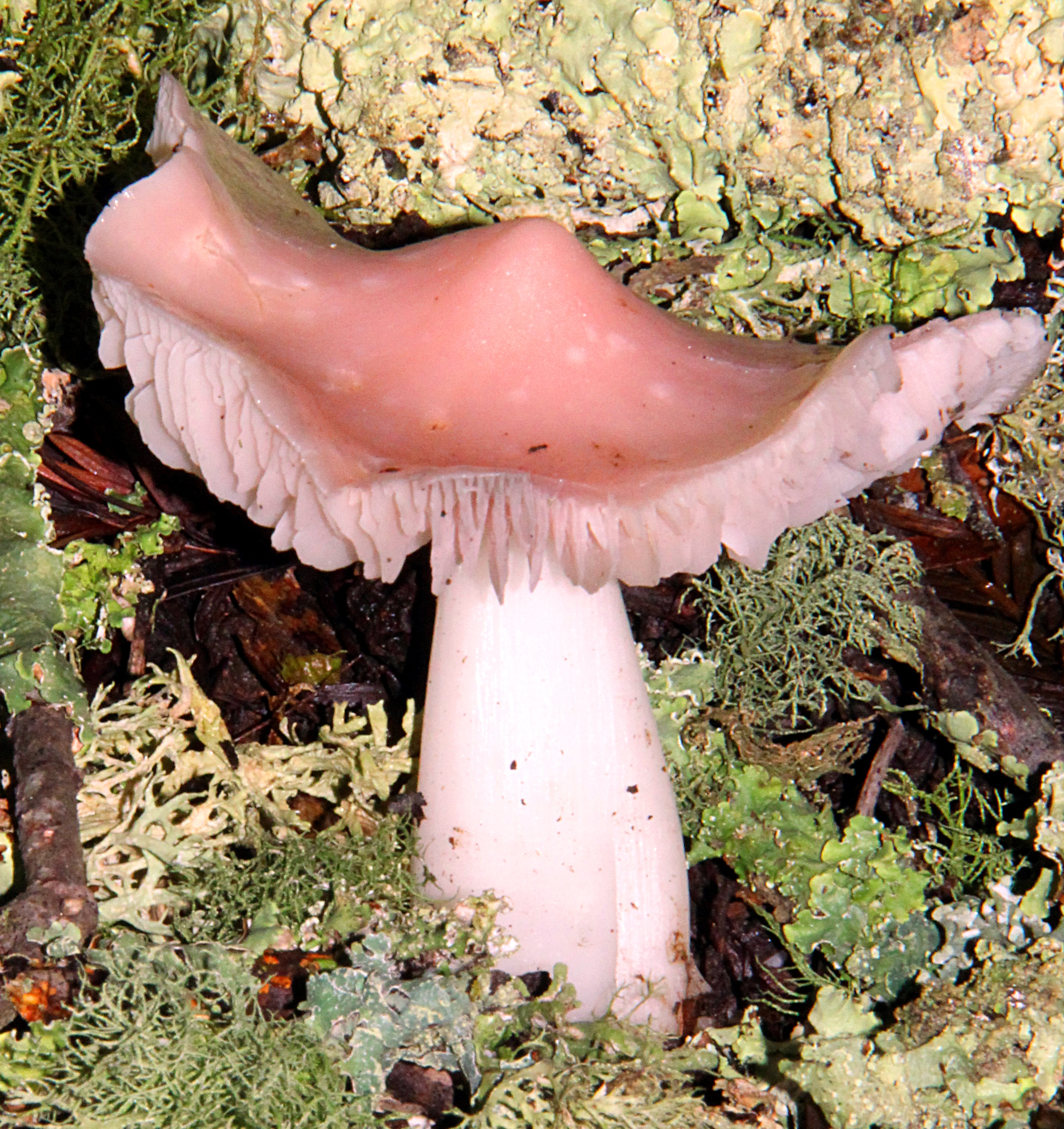
- Porpolomopsis calyptriformis

Scientific classification
- Domain: Eukaryota
- Kingdom: Fungi
- Division: Basidiomycota
- Class: Agaricomycetes
- Order: Agaricales
- Family: Hygrophoraceae
- Genus: Porpolomopsis; Bresinsky (2008)

Type species
- Porpolomopsis calyptriformis (Berk.) Bresinsky (2008)

Species
- P. calyptriformis P. lewelliniae

= Porpolomopsis =

Genus of fungi

Porpolomopsis is a genus of fungi in the family Hygrophoraceae. It was circumscribed in 2008 by Andreas Bresinsky to contain P. calyptriformis. Bresinsky separated it from the genus Hygrocybe based on its color and the absence of DOPA pigments. P. lewelliniae was transferred to the genus based on DNA and morphology. Three undescribed species also belong in the genus. Species of Porpolomopsis have also formerly been placed in the genus Humidicutis, to which they are closely related but differ in having narrowly attached or free gills and the shape of the hyphae in their cap. Species of Porpolomopsis are found in Europe, North America, Asia, Australia and New Zealand.

== See also ==
- List of Agaricales genera
