= 1992 New Year Honours (New Zealand) =

Annual awards for New Zealanders

The 1992 New Year Honours in New Zealand were appointments by Elizabeth II on the advice of the New Zealand government to various orders and honours to reward and highlight good works by New Zealanders. The awards celebrated the passing of 1991 and the beginning of 1992, and were announced on 31 December 1991.

The recipients of honours are displayed here as they were styled before their new honour.

== Knight Bachelor ==
- Barry John Curtis JP – of Manukau City. For services to local government and the community.
- Dr Colin James Maiden – of Auckland. For services to education and business management.
- Patrick William Eisdell Moore OBE – of Auckland. For services to otolaryngology.
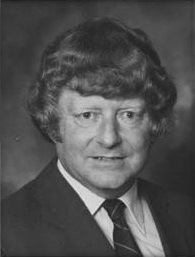
Sir Barry Curtis

== Order of Saint Michael and Saint George ==
=== Companion (CMG) ===
- Graham Keith Ansell – of Paraparaumu; lately Secretary of External Relations and Trade.
- The Honourable William Lambert Young JP – of Wellington. For public services.
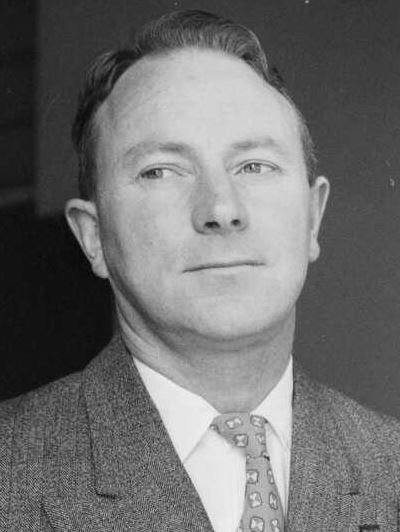
Bill Young

== Order of the British Empire ==
=== Commander (CBE) ===
Civil division

- Robert James Charles OBE – of Oxford. For services to golf.
- Emeritus Professor Ian Edward Coop OBE – of Christchurch. For services to farming.
- Patrick Hogan – of Cambridge. For services to Thoroughbred racing.
- David Livingstone Holmes MBE JP – of Chatham Islands. For services to the people of the Chatham Islands.
- Professor John Desmond Hunter – of Wānaka. For services to medicine.
- Ian William Lawrence – of Wellington. For services to local government and the community.
- Dr Donald Rees Llewellyn JP – of Hamilton. For services to education and the community.
- Raymond Francis Smith OBE ED – of Rotorua. For services to the newspaper industry.
- The Honourable Maxwell Helier Vautier QC – of Auckland. For services to the law.
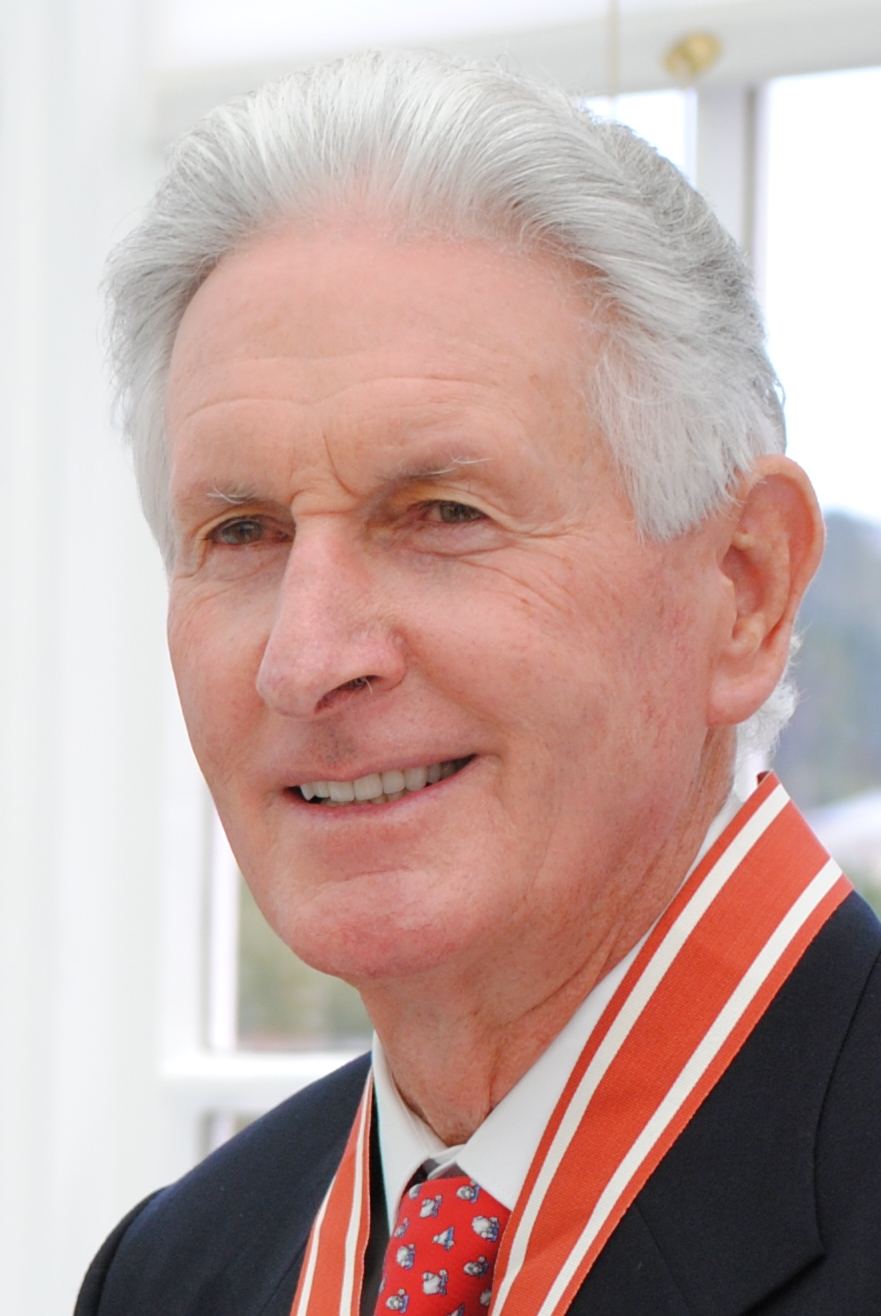
Bob Charles

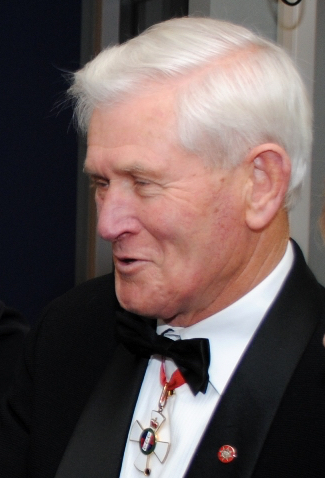
Patrick Hogan

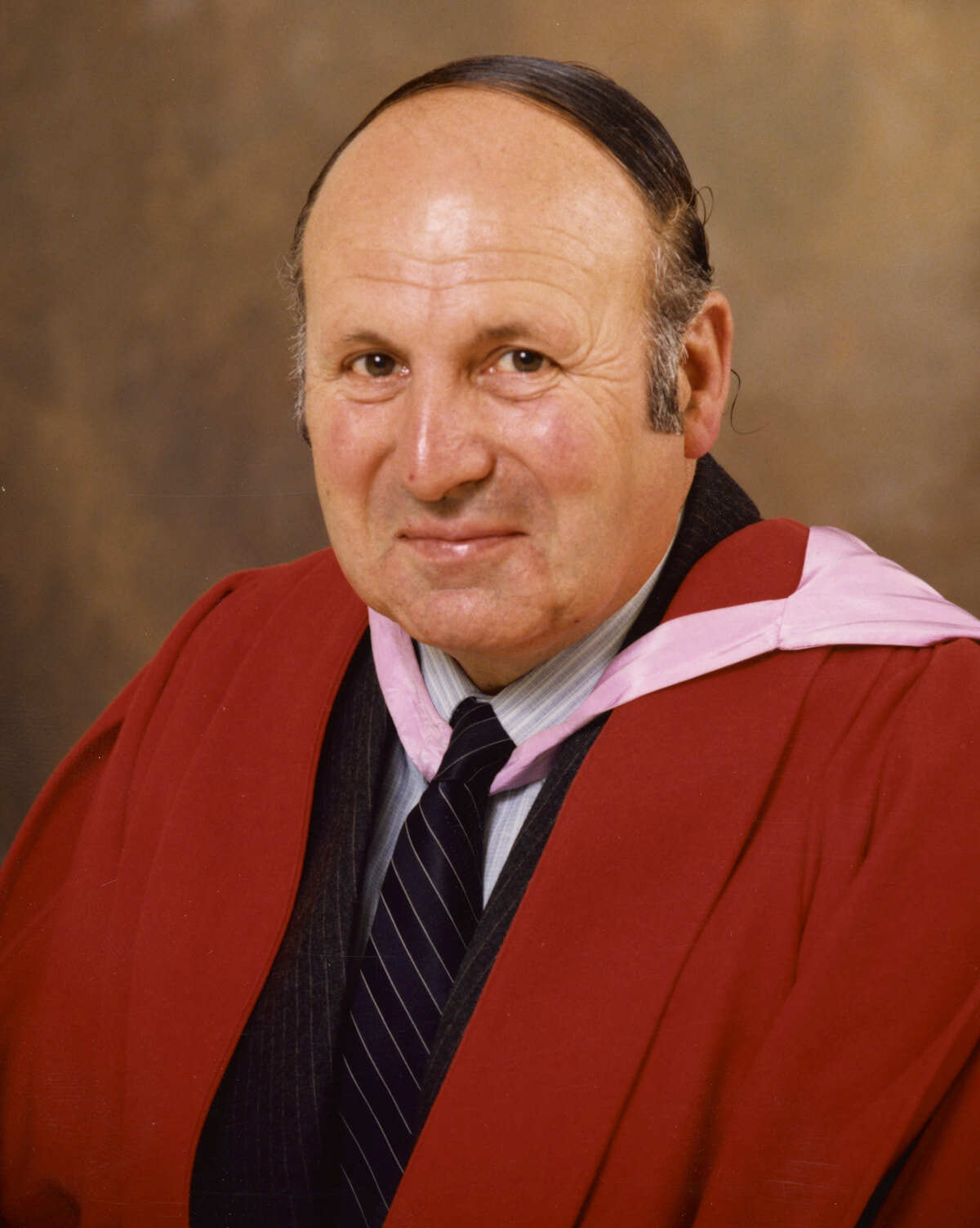
John Hunter

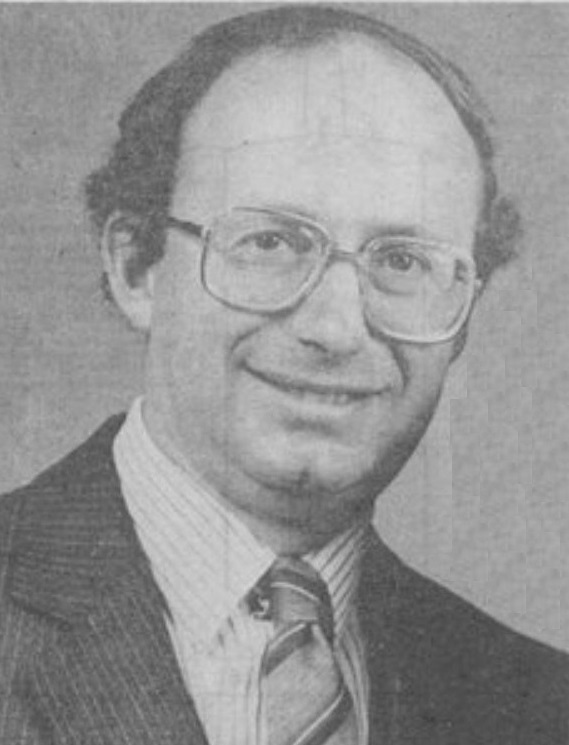
Ian Lawrence

=== Officer (OBE) ===
Civil division

- Alfred Charles Cleaver – of Reefton. For services to local-body and community affairs.
- Maurice Cleland JP – of New Plymouth. For services to technical education and the community.
- Cassia Joy Cowley – of Picton. For services to children's literature.
- Mavis Melville Davidson – of Warkworth. For services to science and mountaineering.
- Emeritus Professor Frank Foster Evison – of Wellington. For services to seismology.
- Robert Murray Gough – of Lower Hutt. For services to the dairy industry.
- Howard William Hunter – of Wellington. For services to surveying.
- Colwell Francis Alston Keen JP – of Parahaki, Whangārei. For services to the dairy industry and the community.
- The Honourable Henry Robert Lapwood – of Rotorua. For public services.
- Peter McNee – of Auckland. For services to humanitarian and welfare work.
- John Duncan McRae – of Auckland. For services to television drama.
- Peter Garth Mander – of Christchurch. For services to yachting.
- Jean Sampson JP – of Auckland. For services to local-body and community affairs.
- Thomas Donald Stanley – of Matamata. For services to local government and swimming.
- James Franklin Stirton – of Lower Hutt. For services to the insurance industry.
- Dr Barbara Mary Stone – of Wanganui. For services to medicine and the community.
- Angus McMillan Tait – of Christchurch. For services to manufacturing and export.
- Horace Charles Warnes – of Nelson. For services to the raspberry industry.

Military division

- Commander Peter Molesworth McHaffie – Royal New Zealand Navy.
- Group Captain James Edward Scutter – Royal New Zealand Air Force (Retired).
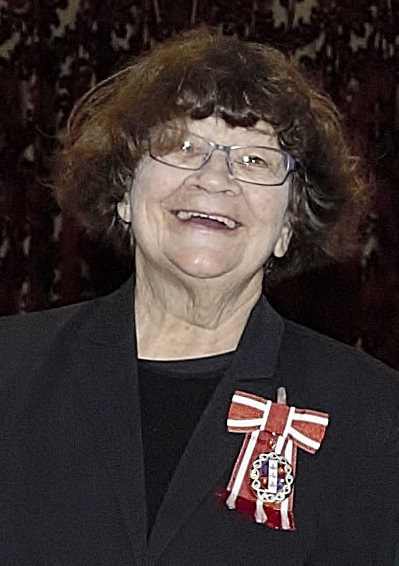
Joy Cowley

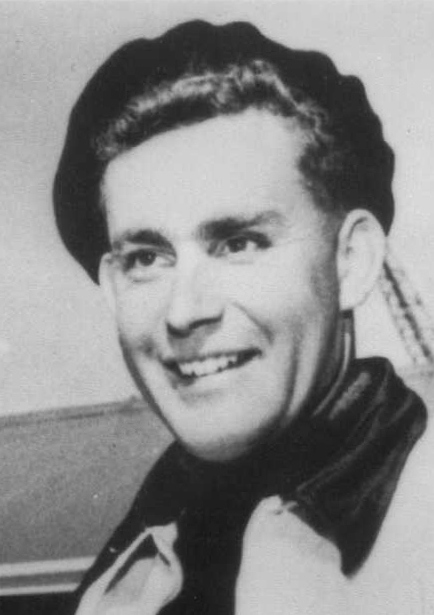
Peter Mander

=== Member (MBE) ===
Civil division

- Barbara Frances Leslie Bagley – of Middlemarch. For services to the community.
- Norma Elizabeth Bates – of Kaikohe. For services to education and youth.
- Sandra Lee Blewett – of Auckland. For services to marathon swimming.
- Martin David Crowe – of Wellington. For services to cricket.
- Malcolm Edward Dick JP – of Blenheim. For services to local government.
- Edwin Glass – of Ashburton. For services to farming.
- Patricia Joan Hill – of Oamaru. For services to paraplegics.
- Henry Brennan Ray Kerr – of Hamilton. For services to epileptics.
- The Reverend Waka Kukutai – of Tuakau. For services to the community.
- Nola Hazel Lyon – of Auckland. For services to bowls.
- Carolyn Ngaire Whylma McCondach – of Auckland. For services to welfare work.
- Martin Philip (Peter) McDermott – of Orewa. For services to the community.
- John Narey McGowan – of Hamilton. For services to the handicapped.
- Owen James Morgan JP – of Waihi. For services to local-body and community affairs.
- Laurence Arthur John O'Keefe – of Eltham. For services to athletics.
- Barry Ian Purdy – of Wellington. For services to the retail industry.
- Dr Patrick Philip Eric Savage ED – of Auckland. For services to mental health.
- Minnie Aldred Stewart – of Dunedin. For services to welfare work.
- Michael Joseph Sullivan JP – of Hokitika. For services to local government.
- Waimarama Taumaunu – of Wellington. For services to netball.
- James Thompson Thwaites – of Manaia. For services to the dairy industry.
- Iritana Terangi Tāwhiwhirangi – of Featherston; general manager, Te Kōhanga Reo National Trust.
- George Edward Wright JP – of Sheffield. For services to local government, the potato industry and the community.
- Neville Berkeley Trendle – Assistant Commissioner, New Zealand Police.

Military division

- Lieutenant Commander John Hugh Williams – Royal New Zealand Naval Volunteer Reserve.
- Major Ian Donald Shepherd Civil ED – Royal New Zealand Army Medical Corps.
- Warrant Officer Class One Paul Brendan O'Connor – Royal Regiment of New Zealand Artillery.
- Squadron Leader Malcolm John Derek Fuller – Royal New Zealand Air Force.
- Warrant Officer Geoffrey William Ford – Royal New Zealand Air Force.
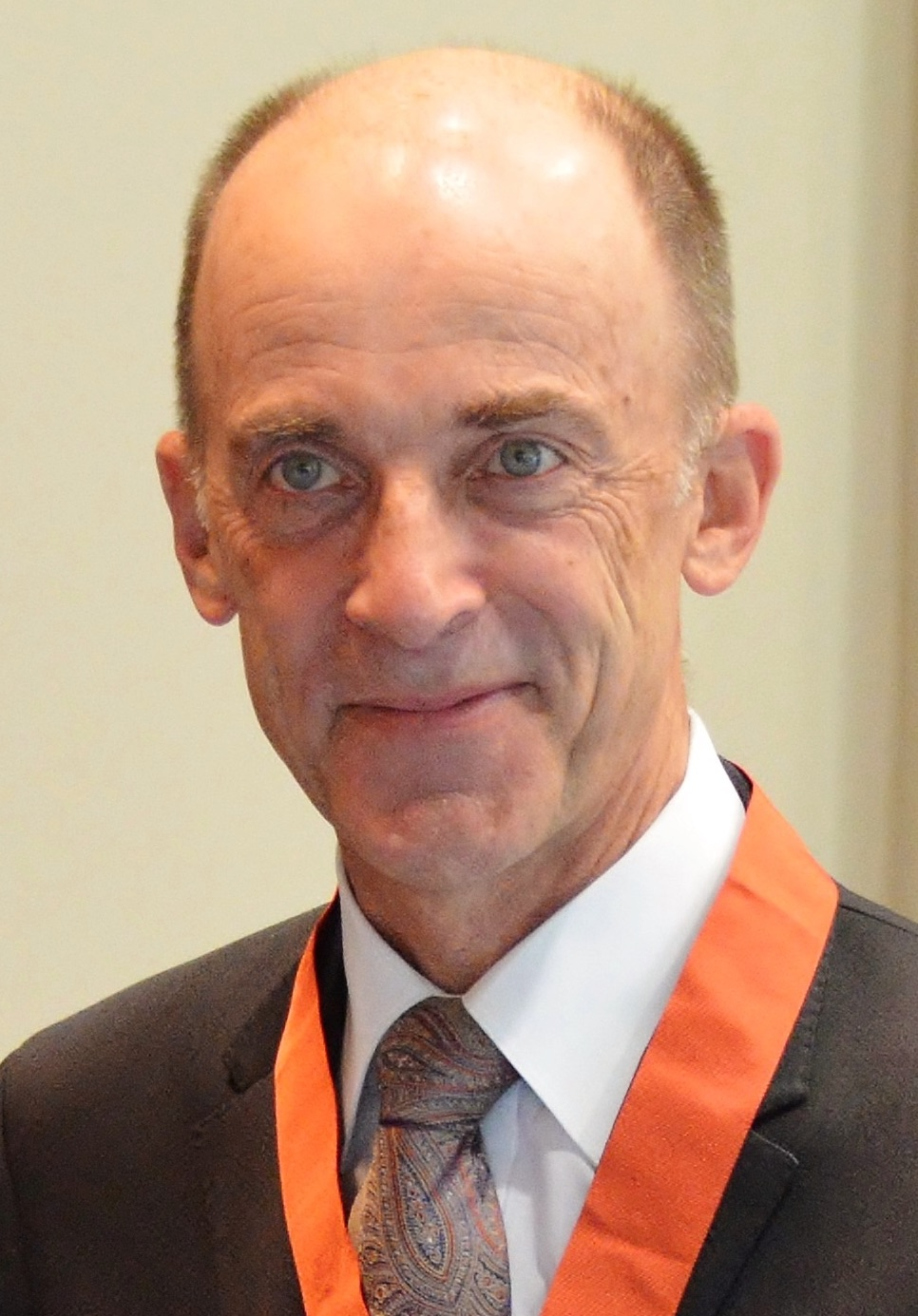
Ian Civil

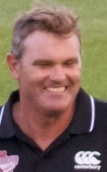
Martin Crowe

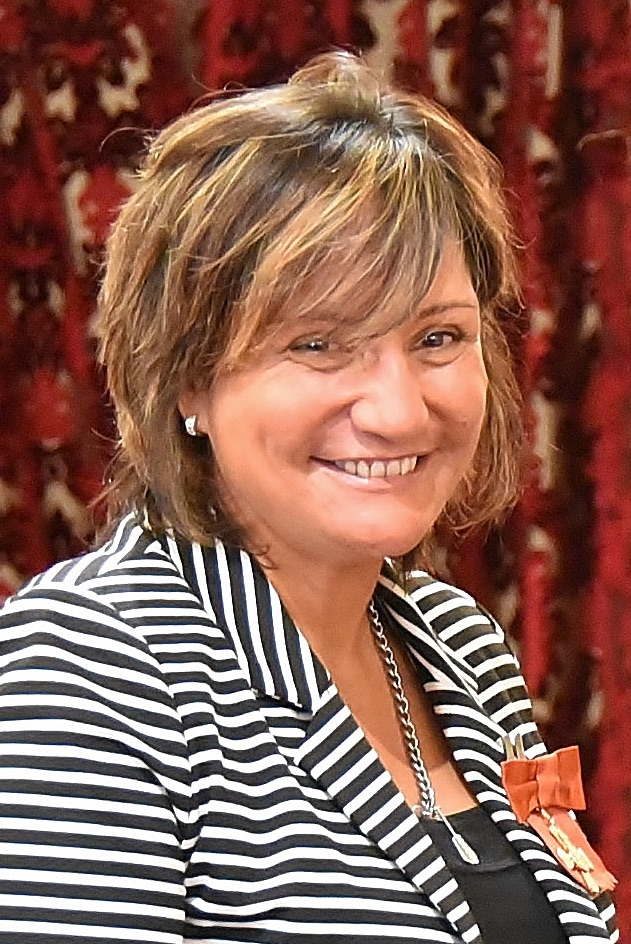
Waimarama Taumaunu

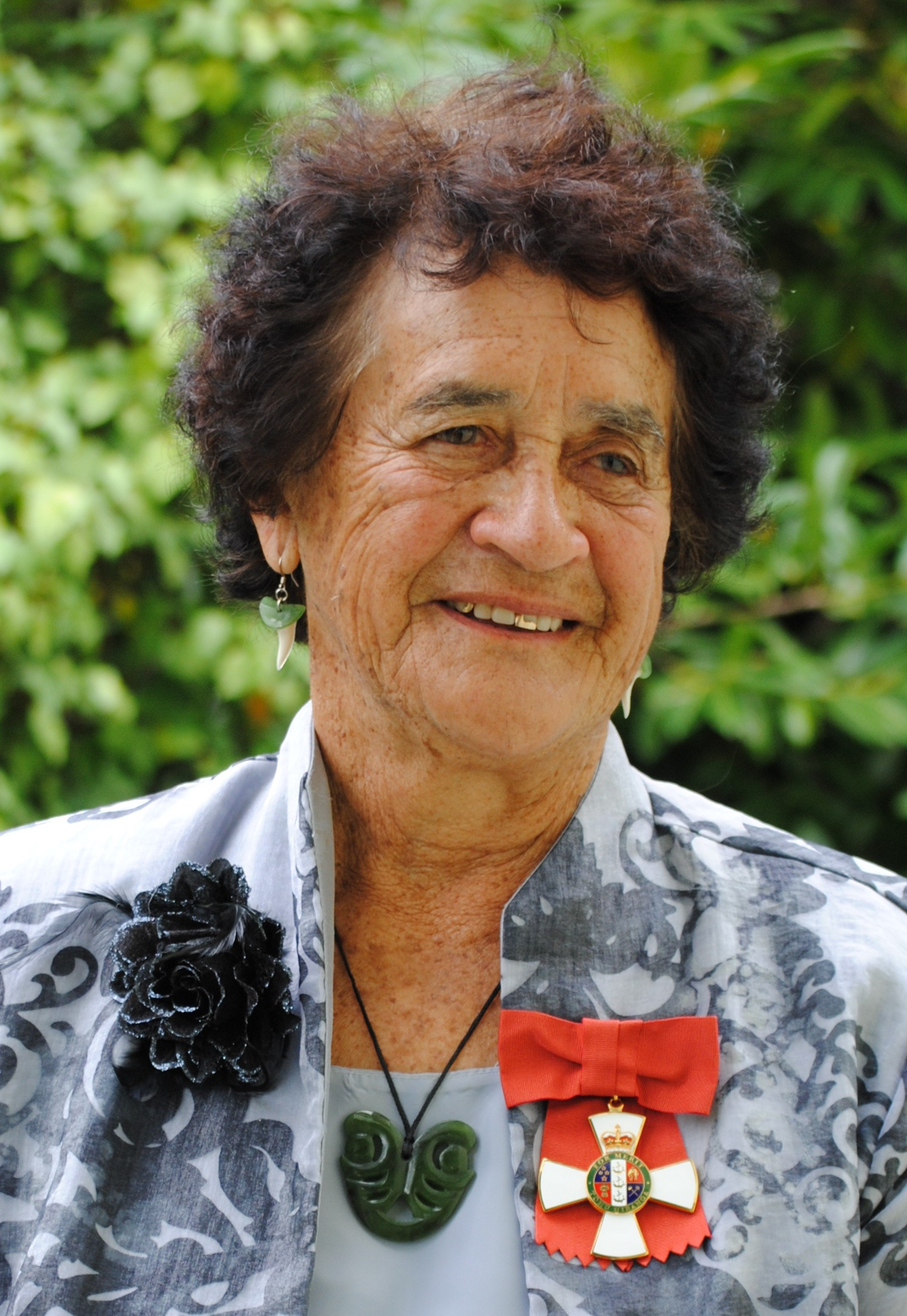
Iritana Tāwhiwhirangi

== British Empire Medal (BEM) ==
Military division

- Leading Writer Constantin Papadopoulos – Royal New Zealand Navy.
- Staff Sergeant Christopher Archibald Campbell – Royal New Zealand Infantry Regiment.
- Sergeant William Thomas McDougall – Royal New Zealand Infantry Regiment (Territorial Force).

== Companion of the Queen's Service Order (QSO) ==
=== For community service ===
- Joan Elizabeth Beale – of Christchurch.
- Eric Roy Grainger – of Auckland.
- Norman David Hardie – of Christchurch.
- Arthur Stanley Helm MBE – of Wellington.
- Frederic Hardwicke Knight – of Dunedin.
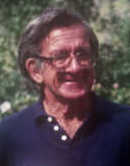
Norman Hardie

=== For public services ===
- The Right Honourable Fraser MacDonald Colman – of Wainuiomata.
- (William) Bryce Harland – of Surrey, United Kingdom; lately New Zealand High Commissioner to the United Kingdom.
- Ngaire Louisa Kilpatrick – of Tapanui.
- The Honourable Arthur Ellis Kinsella – of Paraparaumu.
- Michael Neville Mayman – of Timaru.
- William John Mitchell – of Auckland; lately District Court judge.
- Paul Warren Rieger JP – of Palmerston North.
- Patricia Josephine Taylor – of Masterton.
- The Honourable Hugh Campbell Templeton – of Wellington.
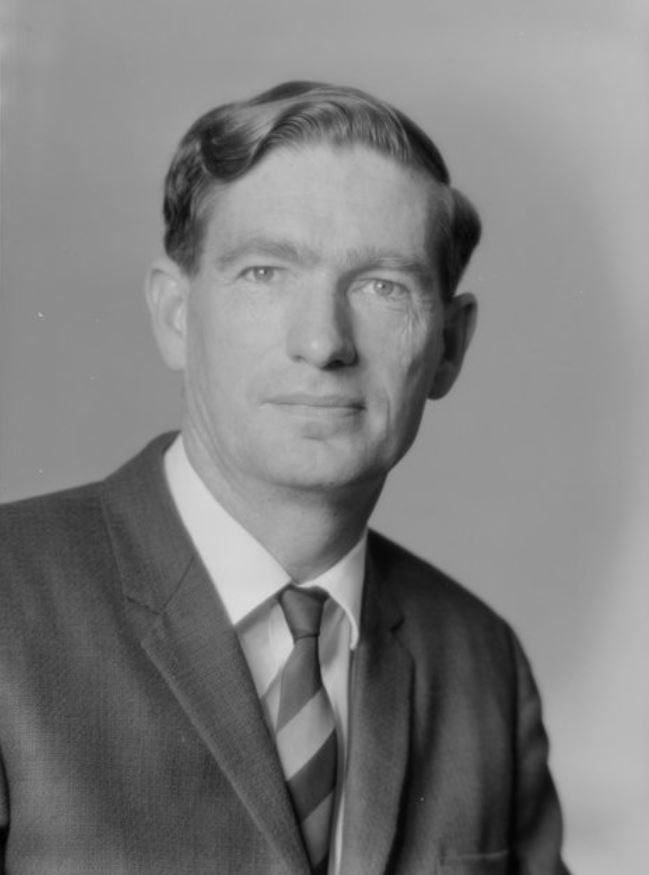
Fraser Colman

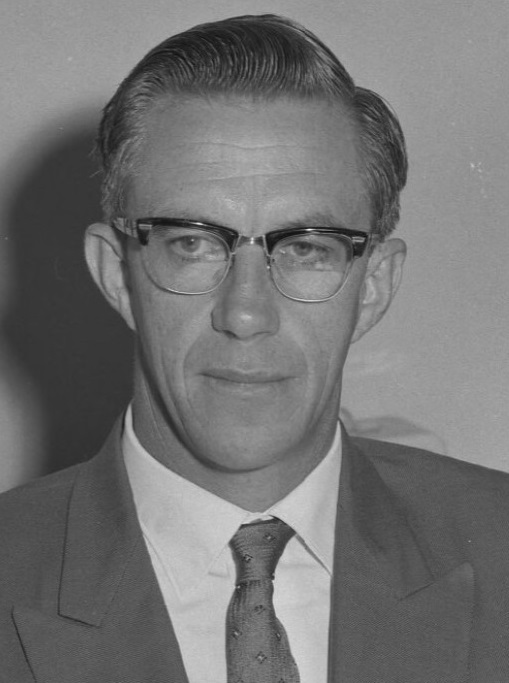
Arthur Kinsella

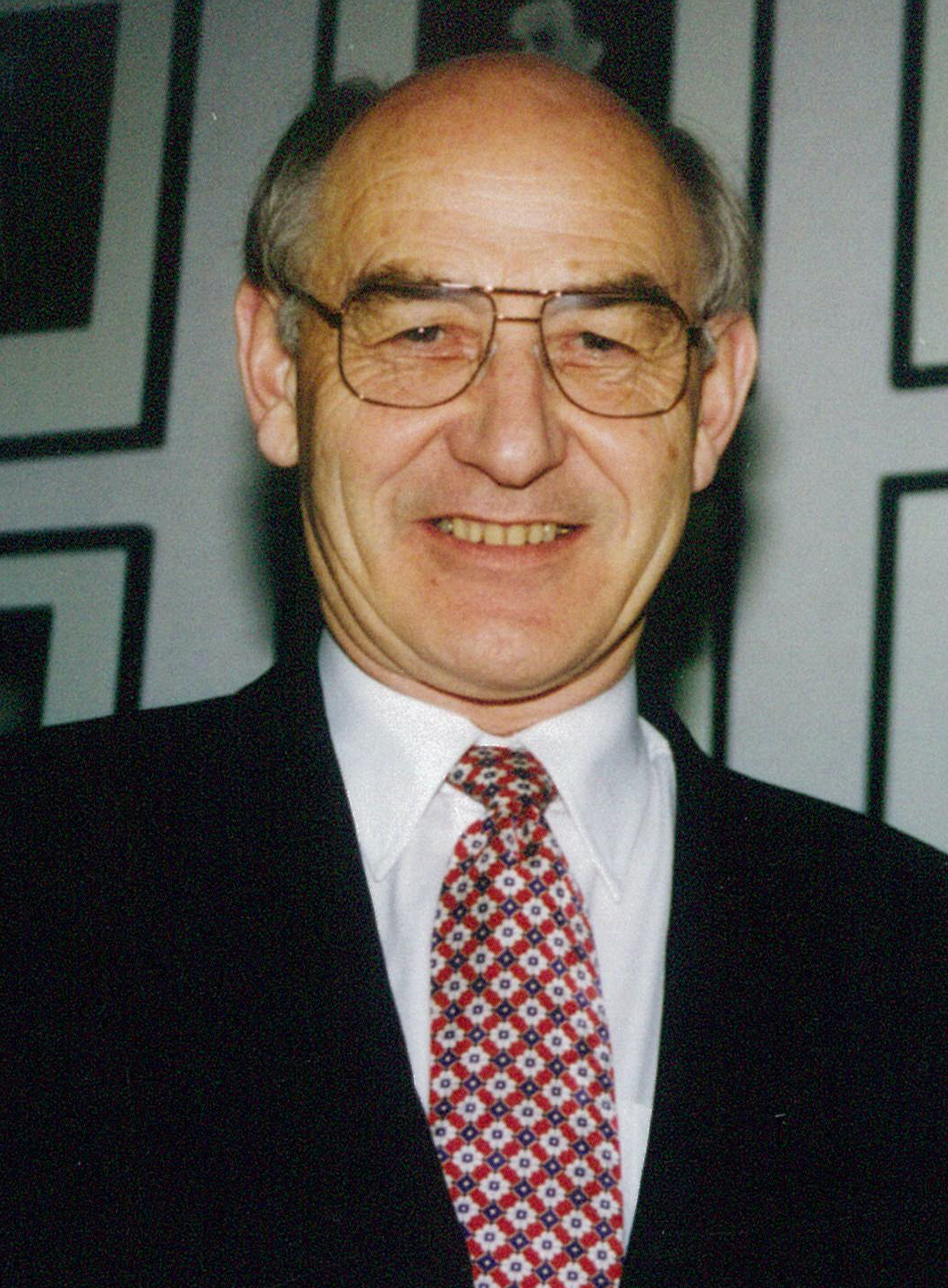
Paul Rieger

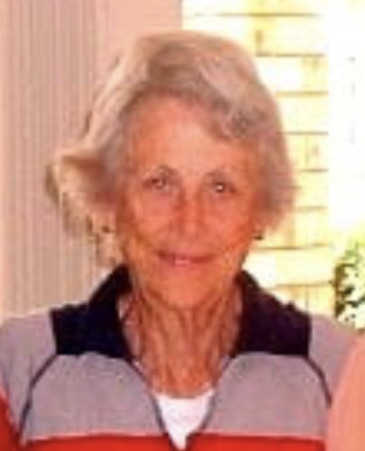
Trish Taylor

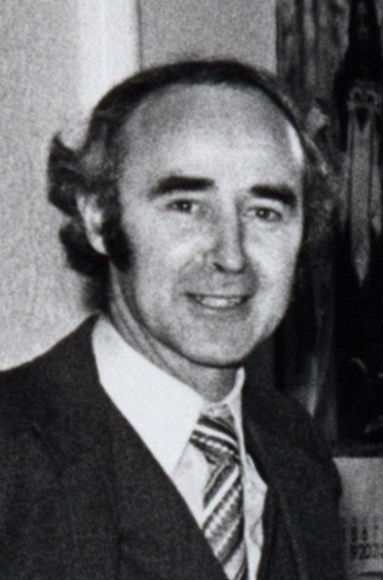
Hugh Templeton

== Queen's Service Medal (QSM) ==
=== For community service ===
- Leslie Arthur Andrews – of Auckland.
- Vavaura Aukino – of Auckland.
- Douglas John Baker JP – of Katikati.
- Herbert Kenneth Barwell – of Rangiora.
- Thomas Ralph Benny – of Ashburton.
- Nellie Charles – of Wellington.
- Pamela Helen Coe – of Waikanae.
- Sidney Birch Creagh – of Christchurch.
- Kathleen Alma Des Forges – of Taupiri.
- Elizabeth Suzanne Dickens – of Taupō.
- Ross Montague Fryer – of Gisborne.
- Maud Emily (Melody) Grant – of Auckland.
- Cyril Stanley Hall – of Havelock North.
- Raymond Anthony Harriss – of Wellington.
- Joyce Mildred Louisa Hirst – of Takanini.
- Catherine Mary Holmes JP – of Christchurch.
- Josephine Marguerite Elaine Knox-Thompson – of Taupō.
- Richard John Littlejohn – of Whakatāne.
- Thelma Beatrice Rosemary Justina Reid Loibl – of Wellington.
- Joan Miller McCall – of Gore.
- Margaret Mary Macnamara – of Invercargill.
- Elizabeth Nancy McConnell – of Auckland.
- Nellie Elizabeth Macown – of Auckland.
- Ross William Malyon – of Auckland.
- Basil Keith Marsh – of Tauranga.
- Nancie Le Morna Marsh – of Upper Hutt.
- Joan Morrell – of Wellington.
- John Edmond O'Neill – of Wanganui.
- Judith Anne O'Sullivan – of Rotorua.
- Nancy Margaret Pickmere – of Kerikeri.
- Dawn Jane Sanders – of Wellington.
- Materita Mamae Hemi (Rita) Smallman – of Tūrangi.
- John Hoani (Nick) Wall – of Taupō.
- Te Aho-o-te-rangi Kathleen Welsh – of Rotorua.
- Wikitoria Te Huruhuru Whatu – of Porirua.
- Bruce John Williams – of Orewa.
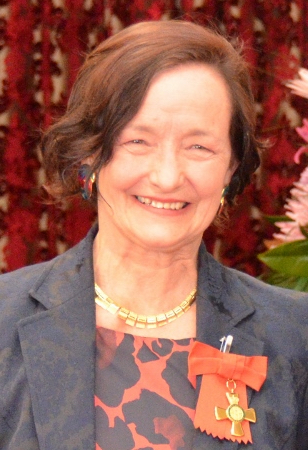
Dawn Sanders

=== For public services ===
- Madge Harkness A'Court – of Cobden.
- Hector Frank Allan – of Nelson.
- Aubrey Gordon Amos Baigent JP – of Hamilton.
- Nancy Barnett – of Rotorua.
- Frederick Sydney Blogg – of Christchurch.
- Cedric Hunter Cochrane JP – of Putāruru.
- Peter Anstie Cornford – of Wellington.
- Francis Thomas Croft JP – of Upper Hutt.
- Doreen Rose Doolan JP – of Petone.
- Rollo George Edkins JP – of Te Kūiti.
- Stuart Charles Eunson JP – of Wyndham.
- Jonathan Ernest Gadsby – of Christchurch.
- Margaret Adam Gardiner – of Dunedin.
- John Roger Gower – senior constable, New Zealand Police.
- Anthony Michael Healy – of Ōtaki.
- Brian Francis Jaques JP – of Kaiwaka.
- Marion Elizabeth Judge – of Christchurch.
- Alistair Newton Lane – of Wellington.
- Colin Francis McMillan – of Hamilton.
- David Alexander McPhail – of Christchurch.
- Pauline Margaret Meads – of Te Kūiti.
- Buddy Haami Netana – senior constable, New Zealand Police.
- Charles Vernon Owen – of Ōtorohanga.
- Margaret Mark Plank – of Auckland.
- Robert Sell – of Auckland.
- Dr Allan Henderson Stewart – of Akaroa.
- Wallace Sutherland – of Ōhope Beach.
- Hendrik Willem (Bill) Ten Hove – of Matamata.
- Henare Raumoa te Ua – of Auckland.
- Rangitane Donald Kakaho Tipene – of Pōrangahau.
- Denise Udy – of Levin.
- Jacobus Petrus (Jack) van der Hulst – of Pukekohe.
- Marjorie (Peggy) Young – of Rai Valley.

== Queen's Fire Service Medal (QFSM) ==
- Robert Andrew McInnes Baillie – fire force commander, No. 6 Region (Dunedin), New Zealand Fire Service.
- Frederick John Kirkwood – firefighter, Balclutha Volunteer Fire Brigade, New Zealand Fire Service.
- Alexander Weir JP – chief fire officer, Raetihi Volunteer Fire Brigade, New Zealand Fire Service.

== Queen's Police Medal (QPM) ==
- Neville John Stokes – detective superintendent, New Zealand Police.
