= Károly Kalchbrenner =

Hungarian mycologist

- Born: 5 May 1807; Pöttelsdorf, Sopron County, Kingdom of Hungary (present-day Austria)
- Died: 6 June 1886 (aged 79); Spišské Vlachy, Kingdom of Hungary (present-day Slovakia)
- Citizenship: Hungarian
- Known for: Papers and descriptions of more than 400 fungi from Europe, Asia, Australia and South America
- Awards: Genus Kalchbrenneriella named in his honour
- Scientific career
- Fields: Mycology
- Author abbrev. (botany): Kalchbr.

Károly Kalchbrenner (born 5 May 1807 in Pöttelsdorf, died 6 June 1886 in Spišské Vlachy) was a Hungarian mycologist. He trained in theology early in life and became a priest in Spišské Vlachy, nowadays at north-eastern Slovakia. His contributions include the publication of 60 papers and description of more than 400 fungi from Europe, Asia, Australia and South America. He wrote and illustrated the Icones Selectae Hymenomycetum Hungariae. Among those he later collaborated with are Ferdinand von Mueller in Victoria, Australia, John Medley Wood in South Africa, Mordecai Cubitt Cooke in England and Felix von Thümen in Austria. He was elected a full member of the Hungarian Academy of Sciences, and a corresponding member of the Linnean Society of New South Wales.

== Taxa named ==
The genus Kalchbrenneriella was named in his honour.

Kalchbrenner's descriptions were included in Mueller's Fragmenta Phytographiae Australiae, and several papers in the Proceedings of the Linnean Society of New South Wales, "Definitions of new fungi" and new descriptions of Western Australian Agaricus in 1882, and further descriptions of new fungi species in 1883.

- Amanita effusa
- Humidicutis lewelliniae
- Lepista caffrorum
- Uredo commelinae

== Publications ==
- Complete bibliography on Worldcat
