= Mavis Davidson =

New Zealand zoologist, biologist and mountaineer

Mavis Davidson OBE
- Born: Mavis Melville Gedye; 10 February 1910; Te Karaka, New Zealand
- Died: 27 May 2004 (aged 94); Leigh, New Zealand
- Education: Wairoa High School; Victoria University College
- Known for: Research into red deer and sika deer
- Spouse: Bill Davidson (m. 1939; died 1990)
- Scientific career
- Fields: Zoology and biology
- Workplaces: New Zealand Forest Service

Mavis Melville Davidson OBE (née Gedye; 10 February 1910 – 27 May 2004) was a New Zealand zoologist, biologist and mountaineer.

== Biography ==
Davidson was born in Te Karaka, Poverty Bay, the seventh of nine children of Thomas James and Dagmar Martha Melville Gedye (née Hansen). She attended primary school in Gisborne and then Wairoa High School, followed by a year at a commercial college in Auckland. After completing her studies, she worked in Auckland and Wellington as a shorthand typist and clerk. During World War II, she served in the Women's Royal Army Corps as a subaltern for four years.

In June 1948, Davidson collected a mushroom specimen from the forest floor of Mount Taranaki. This was later identified as a novel species by Greta Stevenson in 1962, who decided to name the species Hygrophorus mavis (now known as Humidicutis mavis) in Davidson's honour.

Davidson studied at Victoria University College and graduated with a master's degree in zoology in 1950, specialising in forestry and deer ecology. She worked in the zoology department at Victoria as a demonstrator and junior lecturer between 1946 and 1950, then in 1958 Davidson was appointed a biologist with the New Zealand Forest Service. She initially worked on red deer, then later moved on to study sika deer in the Kaimanawa and Kaweka Ranges of the central North Island.

Davidson was also a mountaineer, although the New Zealand Alpine Club and the Tararua Tramping Club did not allow her to join their mountaineering trips to the Southern Alps. Instead, she organised her own trips, and in 1953 she led the first all-women group of climbers to ascend Aoraki / Mount Cook. She also led all-women groups to climb Mount Aspiring / Tititea and Mount Avalanche. In 1971, she joined a party that climbed to the base of Mount Everest.

Davidson retired from the Forest Service and moved to Leigh, in Northland, in 1983. In about 1999, she had one of her legs amputated above the knee, and in 2004 was told that her other leg would also require amputation. She died on 27 May that year, before a decision was made.

=== Recognition ===
In the 1992 New Year Honours, Davidson was appointed an Officer of the Order of the British Empire, for services to science and mountaineering. She also received a gold badge of honour from the Internationale Gessellschaft Sikawild (International Sika Society) for her research on sika deer. She was appointed a Fellow of the New Zealand Institute of Foresters.

== Personal life ==
Davidson married Bill (William) Davidson in 1939. He died in November 1990.
