= Sandra Blewett =

New Zealand swimmer (1949–2024)

Sandra Blewett MBE
Personal information
- Born: 16 September 1949
- Died: 1 January 2024 (aged 74)

Sport
- Sport: Swimming

Sandra Lee Blewett MBE (16 September 1949 – 1 January 2024) was a New Zealand swimmer and coach.

== Career ==
Since 1971, Blewett was an advanced swimming instructor and coach for non-disabled and disabled swimmers. She was also an athlete in her own right. She held records of 44 hours for endurance swimming from Whangarei to Auckland, 33 hours for a double crossing of Lake Taupō and a 25-hour swim in a heated 25 metre swimming pool.

Blewett worked in the development of Parasports in New Zealand for over 25 years in many roles including in NZ Para swimming and Parafed Auckland. After this she was a member of the board of Paralympics New Zealand from 2001 to 2008. Blewett operated the Sandra Blewett Learn to Swim School.

Blewett was awarded an MBE in the 1992 New Year Honours. In 2022, Paralympics New Zealand awarded her the PNZ Order of Merit for outstanding service.
