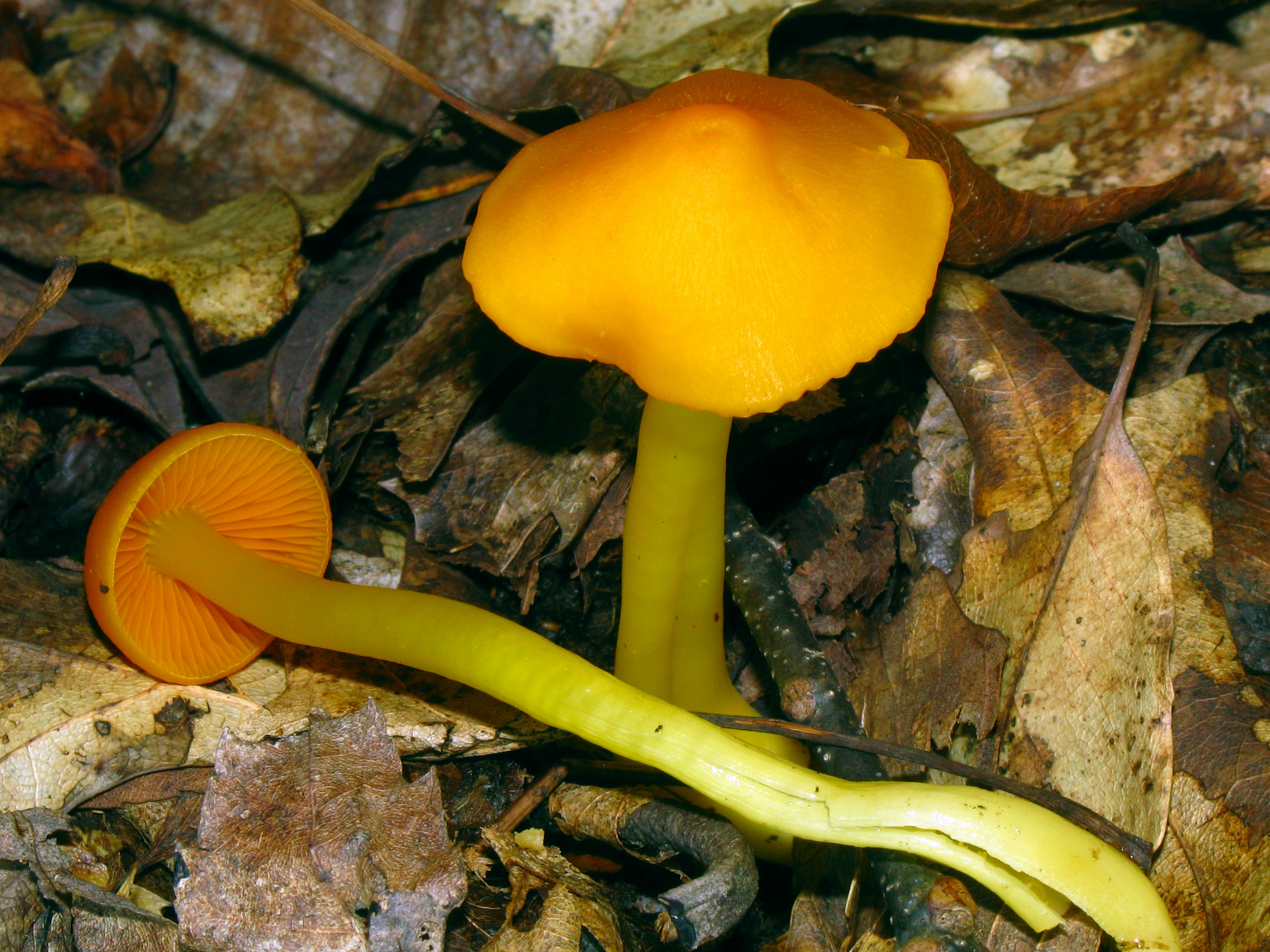

Scientific classification
- Kingdom: Fungi
- Division: Basidiomycota
- Class: Agaricomycetes
- Order: Agaricales
- Family: Hygrophoraceae
- Genus: Humidicutis
- Species: H. marginata

Binomial name
- Humidicutis marginata (Peck) Singer

Synonyms
- Hygrophorus marginatus Peck; Hygrocybe marginata (Peck) Murrill; Tricholoma marginatum (Peck) Singer

= Humidicutis marginata =

Humidicutis marginata
- Mycological characteristics
- Gills on hymenium
- Cap is umbonate
- Hymenium is adnexed
- Stipe is bare
- Spore print is white
- Ecology is saprotrophic
- Edibility is not recommended

Humidicutis marginata is a gilled fungus of the waxcap family.

== Taxonomy ==
The species was first described as Hygrophorus marginatus by Charles Horton Peck in 1876. William Alphonso Murrill called it Hygrocybe marginata in 1916. It was transferred to the new genus Humidicutis by Rolf Singer in 1958, who had previously placed it in Tricholoma.

== Description ==
The orangish cap is up to 4 centimetres (1 1/2 in) wide and the yellowish stipe 9 cm (3 1/2 in) long. The spore print is white.

== Distribution and habitat ==
It is found in North America under trees. In the Pacific Northwest, var. olivacea often grows under western redcedar. However, it is rare.

== Edibility ==
Some sources consider it edible with a pleasant taste, but one guide says it is "not worthwhile". Another source lists its edibility, specifically that of var. olivacea, as unknown.
