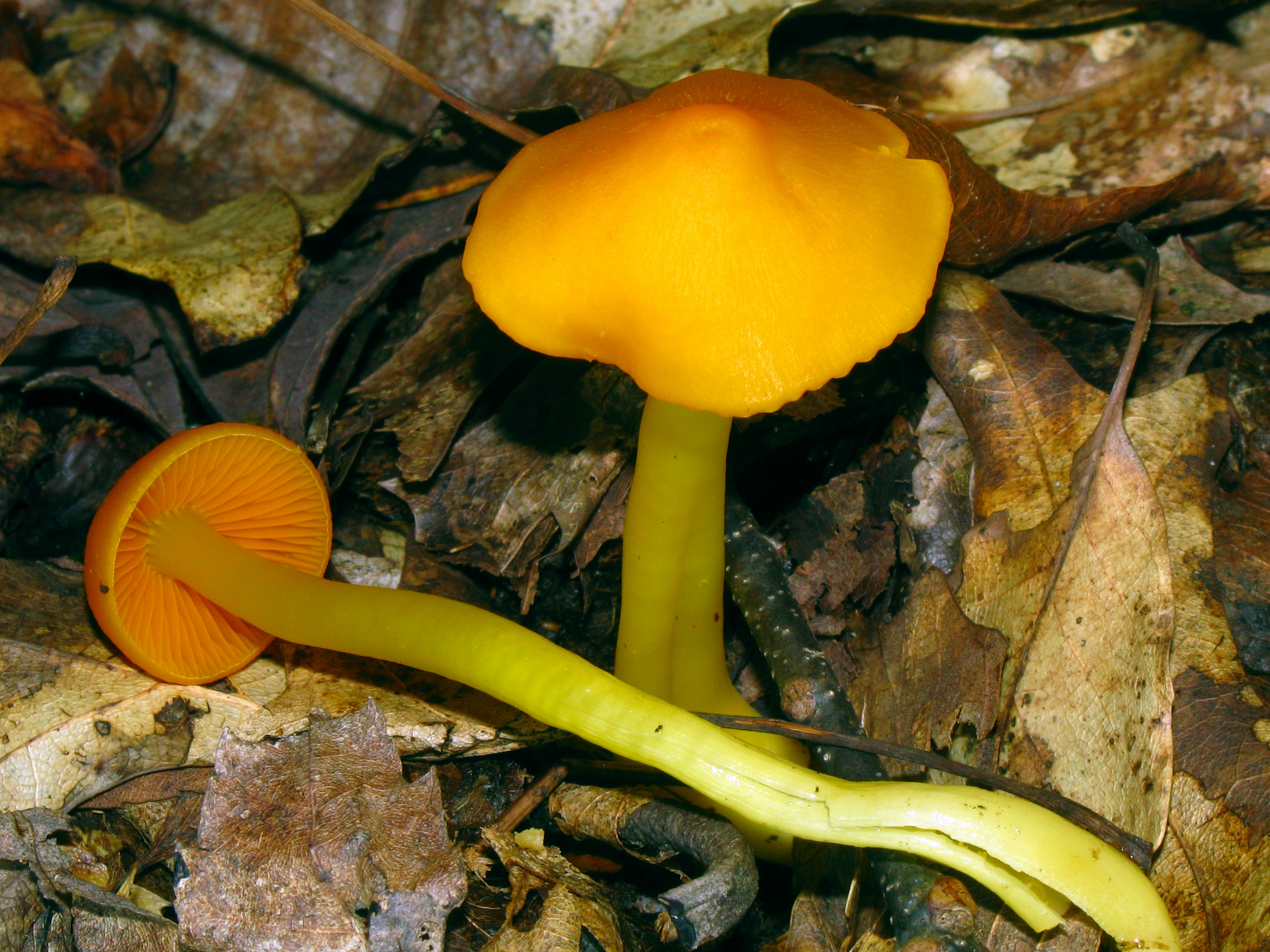
- Humidicutis marginata

Scientific classification
- Kingdom: Fungi
- Division: Basidiomycota
- Class: Agaricomycetes
- Order: Agaricales
- Family: Hygrophoraceae
- Genus: Humidicutis; Singer (1959)

Type species
- Humidicutis marginata (Peck) Singer (1959)

Synonyms
- Tricholoma subgen. Humidicutis Singer (1948)

= Humidicutis =

Genus of fungi

Humidicutis is a small genus of brightly coloured agarics, the majority of which are found in Eastern Australia. They were previously described as members of Hygrocybe. The genus Porpolomopsis is closely related, and the species in it were once placed in Humidicutis. The genus was described by mycologist Rolf Singer in 1959.

The generic name derives from the Latin humidus "moist" and cutis "skin", referring to their moist caps.

== Species ==
- Humidicutis arcohastata
- Humidicutis auratocephala
- Humidicutis bagleyi
- Humidicutis brunneovinacea
- Humidicutis calyptriformis
- Humidicutis conspicua
- Humidicutis czuica
- Humidicutis helicoides
- Humidicutis lilacinoviridis
- Humidicutis luteovirens
- Humidicutis marginata
- Humidicutis mavis
- Humidicutis multicolor
- Humidicutis peleae
- Humidicutis poilena
- Humidicutis pura
- Humidicutis rosella
- Humidicutis roseorubra
- Humidicutis taekeri
- Humidicutis viridimagentea
- Humidicutis woodii

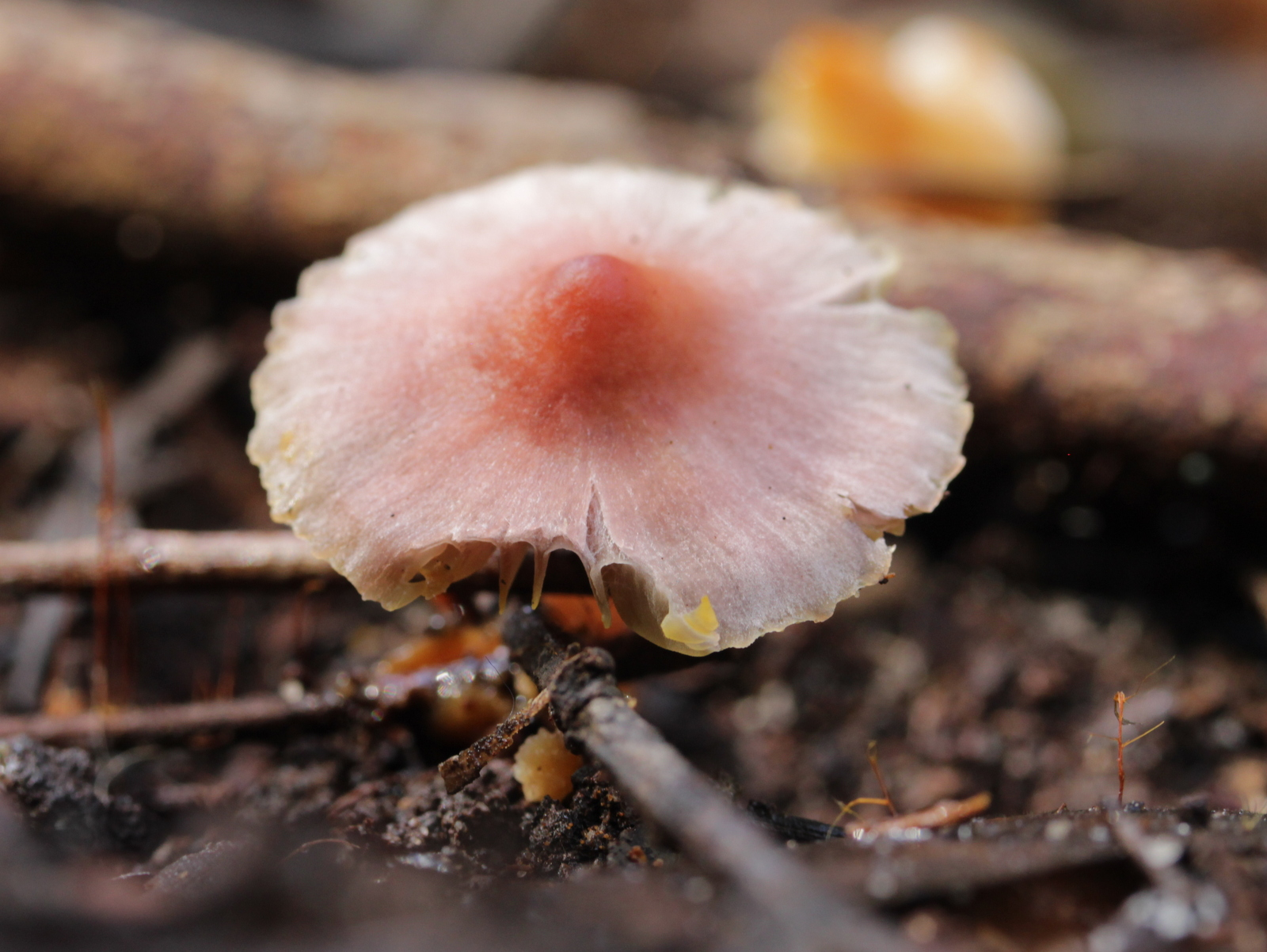
undescribed Humidicutis at Ferndale Park, Australia

== See also ==
- List of Agaricales genera
