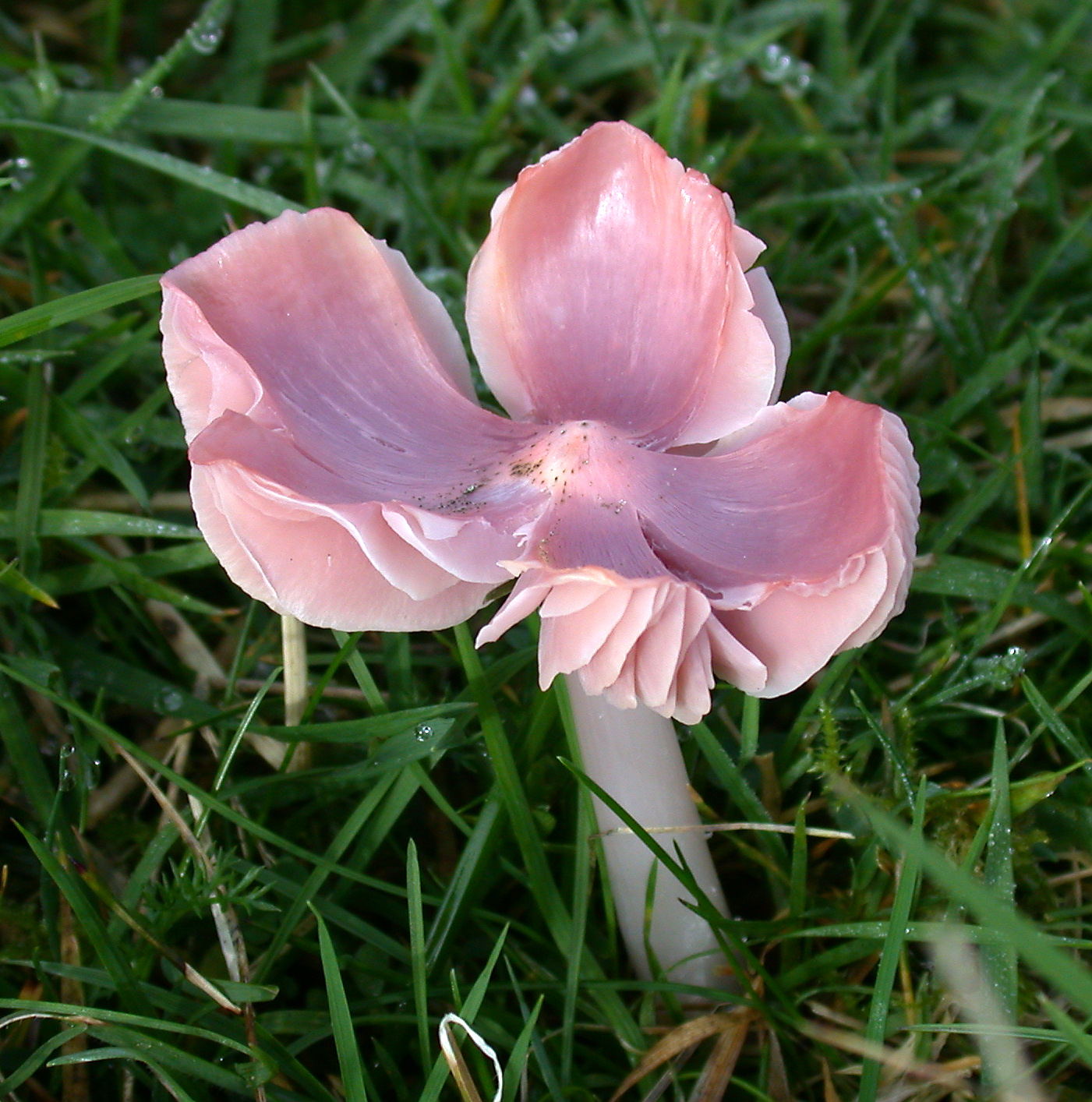
- In England

Conservation status
- Vulnerable (IUCN 3.1)

Scientific classification
- Kingdom: Fungi
- Division: Basidiomycota
- Class: Agaricomycetes
- Order: Agaricales
- Family: Hygrophoraceae
- Genus: Porpolomopsis
- Species: P. calyptriformis

Binomial name
- Porpolomopsis calyptriformis (Berk.) Bresinsky (2008)

Synonyms
- Agaricus calyptriformis Berk. (1838); Hygrophorus calyptriformis (Berk.) Berk. (1860); Hygrocybe calyptriformis (Berk.) Fayod (1889); Godfrinia calyptriformis (Berk.) Herink (1958); Porpoloma calyptriformis (Berk.) Bresinsky (2003)

= Porpolomopsis calyptriformis =

Species of fungus

Porpolomopsis calyptriformis, commonly known as the pink wax cap, ballerina waxcap or salmon waxy cap, is a species of agaric (gilled mushroom) in the family Hygrophoraceae. The species has a European distribution, occurring mainly in agriculturally unimproved grassland. Threats to its habitat have resulted in the species being assessed as globally "vulnerable" on the IUCN Red List of Threatened Species. A similar but as yet unnamed species occurs in North America.

== Taxonomy ==
The species was first described in 1838 by the Rev. Miles Joseph Berkeley as Agaricus calyptraeformis (so spelt), based on specimens he collected locally in England. In 1889, Swiss mycologist Victor Fayod moved it to the genus Hygrocybe. The specific epithet comes from Greek καλὐπτρα (= a woman's veil) + Latin forma (= shape), hence "veil-shaped".

In 2008, Bresinsky proposed the genus Porpolomopsis to accommodate the species. Recent molecular research, based on cladistic analysis of DNA sequences, found that P. calyptriformis does not belong in Hygrocybe sensu stricto and confirmed its removal to Porpolomopsis.

== Description ==
The basidiocarps are agaricoid, the cap narrowly conical at first, retaining an acute umbo when expanded, up to 7.5 centimetres (3 in) across, often splitting when expanded, the margins turning upwards. The cap surface is smooth to fibrillose, slightly shiny or greasy, pale rose-pink to lilac-pink (rarely white). The lamellae (gills) are widely spaced, waxy, cap-coloured or whiter. The stipe (stem) is up to 16 cm (6 1/4 in) long, smooth, white to pale cap-coloured, lacking a ring. The spore print is white, the spores (under a microscope) smooth, inamyloid, ellipsoid, c. 6.5 to 8.0 by 4.5 to 5.5 μm.

The species can normally be distinguished in the field, thanks to its shape and colour. No other European waxcap is pink with a pointed cap.

== Distribution and habitat ==
The Pink Waxcap is widespread but generally rare throughout Europe, with its stronghold in the United Kingdom, where it is not uncommon. Like other waxcaps it occurs in old, agriculturally unimproved short-sward grassland (pastures and lawns). The species has been reported from North America, but specimens that have been DNA-sequenced are not the same as the European P. calyptriformis.

Recent research suggests waxcaps are neither mycorrhizal nor saprotrophic but may be associated with mosses.

== Conservation ==
Porpolomopsis calyptriformis is typical of waxcap grasslands, a declining habitat due to changing agricultural practices. As a result, the species is of global conservation concern and is listed as "vulnerable" on the IUCN Red List of Threatened Species. It is also one of 33 larger fungi proposed for international protection under the Bern Convention. Porpolomopsis calyptriformis also appears on the official or provisional national red lists of threatened fungi in several European countries, including Austria, Bulgaria, the Czech Republic, Denmark, France, Germany (Bavaria), Hungary, Italy, Poland, Slovakia, Spain, and Switzerland.

Porpolomopsis calyptriformis
- Mycological characteristics
- Gills on hymenium
- Cap is conical
- Hymenium is adnate or free
- Stipe is bare
- Spore print is white
- Edibility is edible

== Uses ==
The species is reportedly edible.
