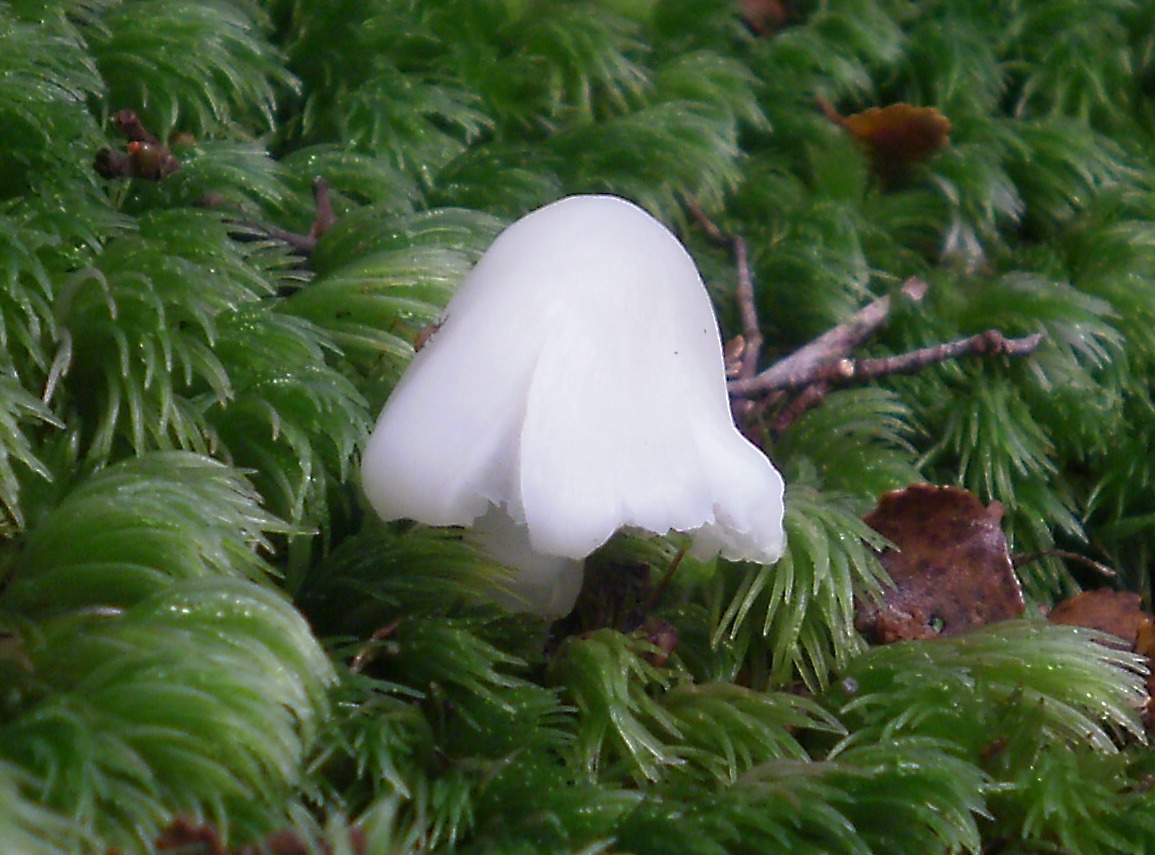

Scientific classification
- Domain: Eukaryota
- Kingdom: Fungi
- Division: Basidiomycota
- Class: Agaricomycetes
- Order: Agaricales
- Family: Hygrophoraceae
- Genus: Humidicutis
- Species: H. mavis

Binomial name
- Humidicutis mavis (G.Stev.) A.M.Young (2005)

Synonyms
- Hygrophorus purus Hygrocybe mavis (G.Stev.) E.Horak; Hygrophorus mavis G.Stev; Humidicutis pura

= Humidicutis mavis =

Species of fungus

Humidicutis mavis is a gilled fungus of the waxcap family. It is found in Australia, Borneo, and New Zealand where the translucent white fungi grows from the ground to a height of 80 mm and a width of 50 mm.

== Taxonomy ==
It was initially described as Hygrophorus mavis by New Zealand mycologist Greta Stevenson in 1962, later as Hygrocybe mavis by Egon Horak in 1971, before being placed in the genus Humidicutis by Australian Tony Young in 1997. The generic name derives from the Latin humidus "moist" and cutis "skin", referring to its moist cap. The species epithet refers to mountaineer Mavis Davidson, who collected the first known specimen of the fungus on Mount Taranaki on 17 June 1948.

The original holotype specimen was collected on 18 June 1949 in New Zealand by T. Levin. It has been compared with collections made by E. J. H. Corner of a Mycena rimosacuta variety alba in Borneo and found to be the same species. It is closely related to Humidicutis lewelliniae and may merely be a white-coloured form of this species.

== Description ==
Humidicutis mavis is a small mushroom with an umbonate cap 4–5 centimetres (1.6–2.0 inches) in diameter, initially conical and later flattening to almost flat. It is smooth and ivory- to pure white in colour with an ivory umbo. The cap is textured with radial fibres, along which it may split, with the gills dividing between the split. The hollow white stipe is 5–6 cm (2–2.5 in) high and 0.3–0.6 cm thick and may be swollen at the base. The white gills are adnexed or free, and thick or distant with even margins. The spore print is white and the hyaline spores are more or less oval, measuring around 6–9 x 4.5–6 μm.

== Distribution and habitat ==
Fruit bodies appear singly or in groups over autumn and winter (April to July) in moss or among leaf litter in wet sclerophyll forest or rainforest in temperate, subtropical or tropical climates. It has been uncommonly recorded from Queensland, New South Wales and Victoria, but is common in Tasmania, and is also found in Borneo and New Zealand, where it has been recorded from Gisborne, Wellington, Nelson and Westland provinces.
