= Eburonian =

Glacial complex in the Calabrian age of the Pleistocene epoch

The Eburonian (German: Eburon or Eburonium), or, much less commonly, the Eburonian Stage, is a glacial complex in the Calabrian age of the Pleistocene epoch and lies between the Tegelen and the Waalian interglacial. The transition from the Tegelen to the Eburonian started about 1.78 million years ago, lasted 480,000 years (to 1.3 million years ago). In geologic strata, at its base, from its startpoint, the Neogene underlies different Gelasian deposits starkly in much of the Netherlands.

== Discovery ==
As early as the 1920s, the names of the three well known glaciations - the Elster, the Saale and the Weichselian - had become established at the recommendation of Konrad Keilhack and Paul Woldstedt. After Penck & Brückner successfully identified a fourth glaciation in the Alps, there were many attempts to find traces of this ice age in the northern Central Europe. Investigations in the Netherlands, into both sedimentology and vegetation, revealed that the number of cold and warm periods must have been considerably greater. In 1957 Zagwijn expanded the hitherto known glacials and interglacials (the Weichselian, Eemian, Saalian, Holstein, Elster and Cromer) by the Menapian glacial, Waalian interglacial, Eburonian glacial, Tegelen interglacial and Pre-Tegelen glacial. After the initial view that there had been continuous warm or cold periods, it quickly became clear that we were looking at "complexes" that included both warm and cold periods. The Eburonian was subdivided into four cold periods, each separated from one another by warmer periods.

== Climate & vegetation ==
Very little is known about the development of the climate and vegetation during the Eburonian. The cold period is subdivided into 7 climatic sections, which differ in their average temperatures. As in the cold periods of the Menapian glacial and the Tegelen interglacial, the average temperature of the Eburonian in summer was about ca. 10 °C and the average annual temperature was -6 to -4 °C. During the warmer sections of the Eburonian, the land was covered by cool coniferous forests; during the cold periods the vegetation was open and treeless.

== See also ==
- Pleistocene, which covers:

Historical names of the "four major" glacials in four regions.
Region	Glacial 1	Glacial 2	Glacial 3	Glacial 4
Alps	Günz	Mindel	Riss	Würm
North Europe	Eburonian	Elsterian	Saalian	Weichselian
British Isles	Beestonian	Anglian	Wolstonian	Devensian
Midwest U.S.	Nebraskan	Kansan	Illinoian	Wisconsinan

Historical names of interglacials.
Region	Interglacial 1	Interglacial 2	Interglacial 3
Alps	Günz-Mindel	Mindel-Riss	Riss-Würm
North Europe	Waalian	Holsteinian	Eemian
British Isles	Cromerian	Hoxnian	Ipswichian
Midwest U.S.	Aftonian	Yarmouthian	Sangamonian

== Literature ==
- Ehlers, Jürgen: Allgemeine und historische Quartärgeologie / Stuttgart: Ferdinand Enke Verlag, 1994 ISBN 3-432-25911-5
- Liedtke, Herbert: Eiszeitforschung / Darmstadt: Wissenschaftliche Buchgesellschaft, 1990 ISBN 3-534-05063-0
