= Beestonian stage =

Early Pleistocene stage used in the British Isles

The Beestonian Stage is an early Pleistocene stage in the geological history of the British Isles. It is named after Beeston Cliffs near West Runton in Norfolk where deposits from this stage are preserved.

The Beestonian precedes the Cromerian Stage and follows the Pastonian Stage. This stage consists of alternating glacial and interglacial phases instead of being a continuous glacial epoch. It is equivalent to Marine isotope stages 22 to (60?). The Beestonian Stage and Marine Isotope Stage 22 ended about 866,000 years ago.

The Beestonian corresponds temporally to the Danube Stage in the glacial history of the Alpine region. Based on findings in the Low Countries, the corresponding timespan in northern continental Europe is divided into four stages, the Bavelian, Menapian, Waalian, and Eburonian.

The Beestonian had also been equated to the Nebraskan glaciation in North America. However, the Nebraskan Stage, along with the Kansan and Aftonian Stages, have been abandoned by North American Quaternary geologists and merged into the Pre-Illinoian Stage. As of 2011, the Beestonian stage is correlated with the period of time that includes the Pre-Illinoian F, Pre-Illinoian G, and Pre-Illinoian H glaciations of North America.

Historical names of the "four major" glacials in four regions.
Region	Glacial 1	Glacial 2	Glacial 3	Glacial 4
Alps	Günz	Mindel	Riss	Würm
North Europe	Eburonian	Elsterian	Saalian	Weichselian
British Isles	Beestonian	Anglian	Wolstonian	Devensian
Midwest U.S.	Nebraskan	Kansan	Illinoian	Wisconsinan

Historical names of interglacials.
Region	Interglacial 1	Interglacial 2	Interglacial 3
Alps	Günz-Mindel	Mindel-Riss	Riss-Würm
North Europe	Waalian	Holsteinian	Eemian
British Isles	Cromerian	Hoxnian	Ipswichian
Midwest U.S.	Aftonian	Yarmouthian	Sangamonian

== See also ==
- Ice age
- Glacial period
- Timeline of glaciation
