= Wisconsin glaciation =

Glaciation in North America during the Last Glacial Period

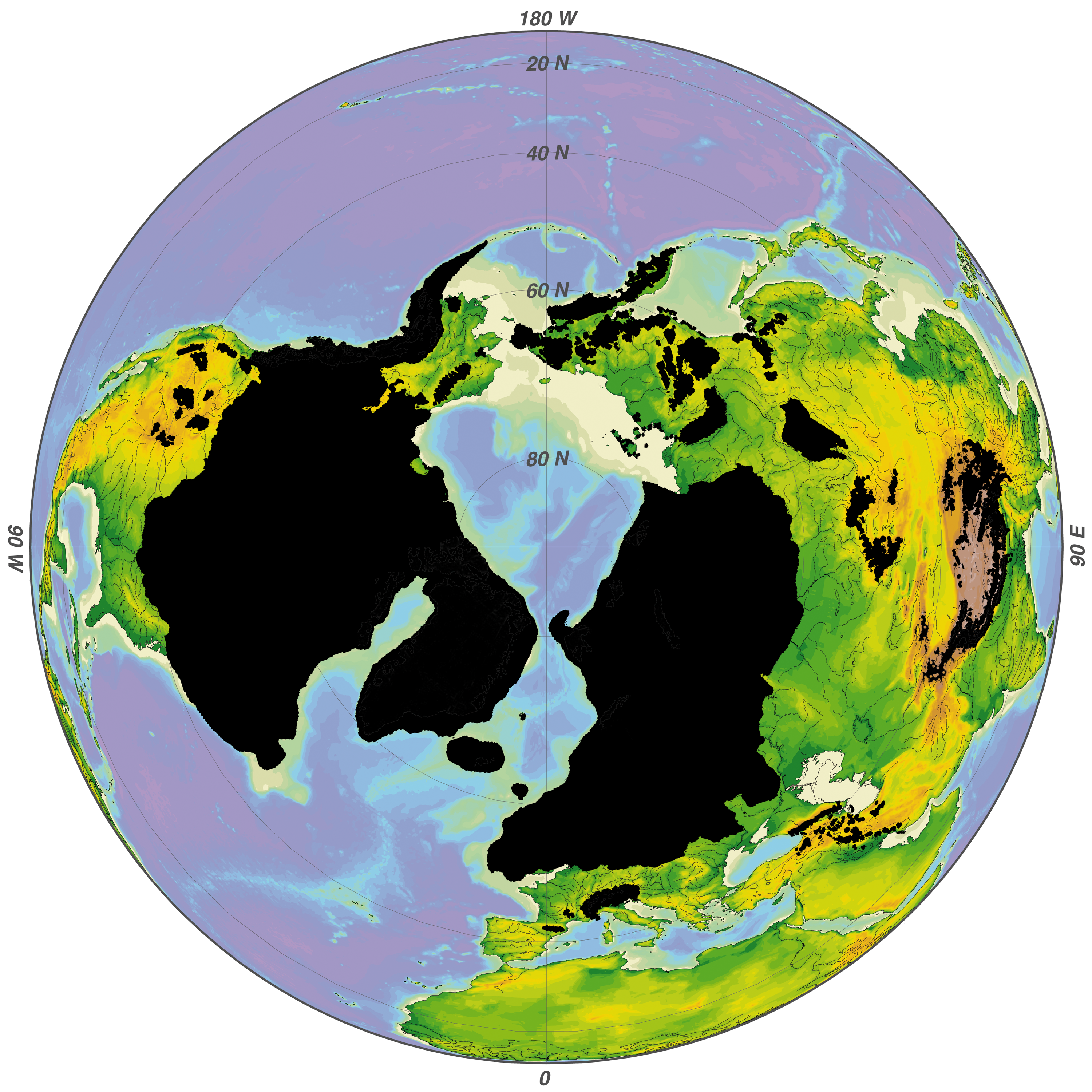
Maximum glaciation of the Northern Hemisphere (black) during the Quaternary climatic cycles

The Wisconsin glaciation, also called the Wisconsin glacial episode, was the most recent glacial period of the North American ice sheet complex, peaking more than 20,000 years ago. This advance included the Cordilleran Ice Sheet, which nucleated in the northern North American Cordillera; the Innuitian ice sheet, which extended across the Canadian Arctic Archipelago; the Greenland ice sheet; and the massive Laurentide Ice Sheet, which covered the high latitudes of central and eastern North America. This advance was synchronous with global glaciation during the last glacial period, including the North American alpine glacier advance, known as the Pinedale glaciation. The Wisconsin glaciation extended from about 75,000 to 11,000 years ago, between the Sangamonian Stage and the current interglacial, the Holocene. The maximum ice extent occurred about 25,000–21,000 years ago during the last glacial maximum, also known as the Late Wisconsin in North America.

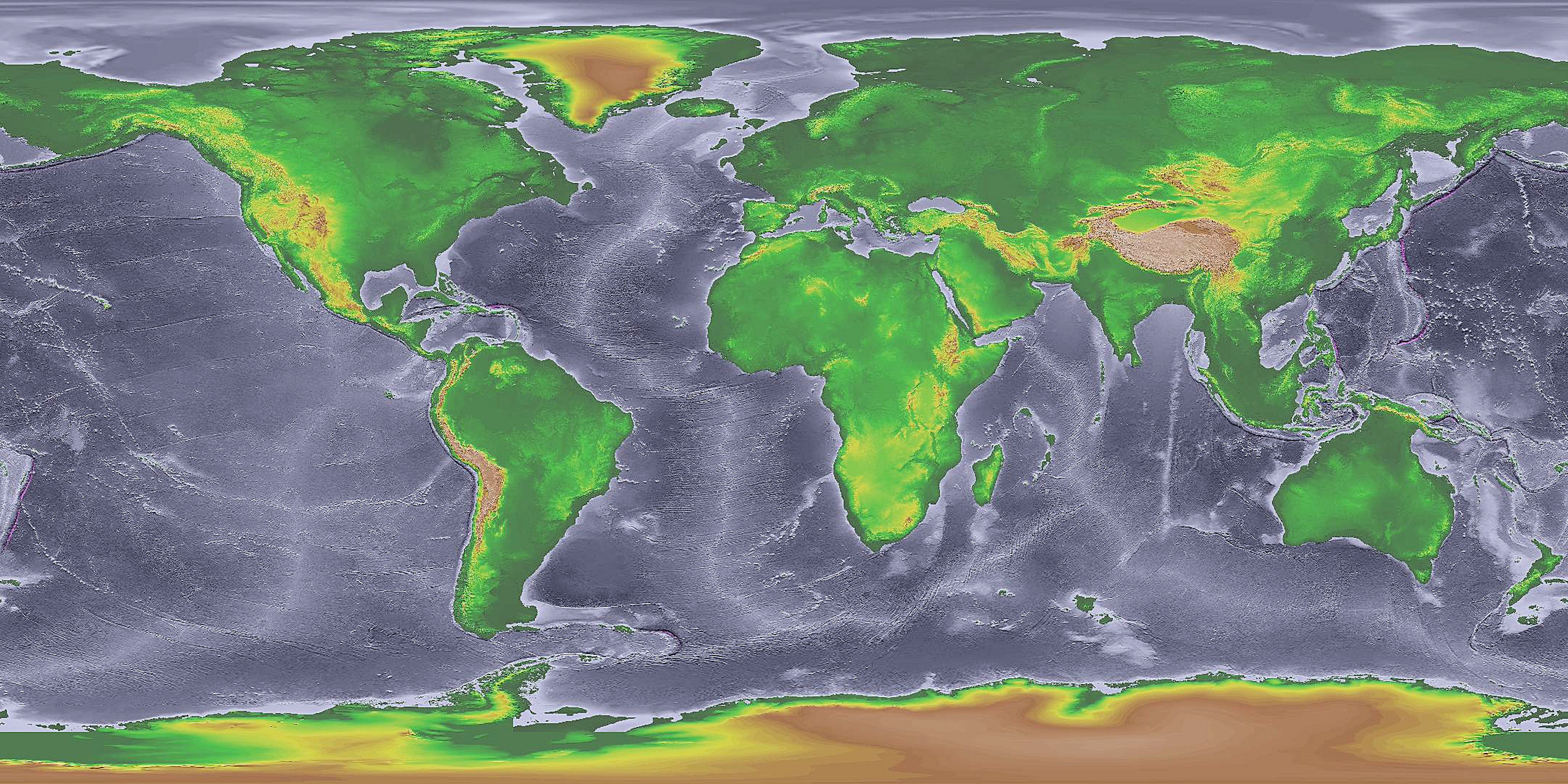
The Last Glacial Period caused a much lower global sea level

This glaciation radically altered the geography north of the Ohio River, creating the Great Lakes. At the height of the Wisconsin Episode glaciation, the ice sheet covered most of Canada, the Upper Midwest, and New England, as well as parts of Idaho, Montana, and Washington. On Kelleys Island in Lake Erie, northern New Jersey and in New York City's Central Park, the grooves left in rock by these glaciers can be easily observed. In southwestern Saskatchewan and southeastern Alberta a suture zone between the Laurentide and Cordilleran ice sheets formed the Cypress Hills, North America's northernmost point that remained south of the continental ice sheets. During much of the glaciation, sea level was low enough to permit land animals, including humans, to occupy Beringia (the Bering Land Bridge) and move between North America and Siberia. As the glaciers retreated, glacial lakes were breached in great glacial lake outburst floods such as the Kankakee Torrent, which reshaped the landscape south of modern Chicago as far as the Ohio and Mississippi Rivers.

== Timeline ==
Two related movements have been termed Wisconsin: Early Wisconsin and Late Wisconsin. The Early Wisconsin was the bigger of the two and extended farther west and south. It retreated an unknown distance before halting. During this period of quiet, the glacial deposits were eroded and weathered. This first Wisconsin period erased all the Illinoian glacial topography that its glaciers extended over. The Late Wisconsin ice sheet extended more towards the west than the earlier movements. This may have been due to changes in the accumulation center of the ice sheet, topographic changes introduced by the Early phase or by pressure changes in the ice mass in the north.

Table I
Table VII – Estimated Age of Glacial Episodes (Leverett)
Age	Years before Present (YBP)
Culmination of Late Wisconsin	50,000
Culmination of Early Wisconsin	100,000
Beginning of Wisconsin	150,000
Culmination of Illinoian	300,000
Beginning of Illinoian	350,000
Culmination of Pre-Illinoian, i.e., old Nebraskan	550,000
Beginning of Pre-Illinoian	1,200,000

== Continental ice sheets ==
=== Laurentide ice sheet ===
Table III Laurentide Ice Sheet
Glacial lobes and sublobes of the southern Laurentide Ice Sheet during the late Wisconsin Glaciation.
Major Lobes	Minor Lobes			
Des Moines	Grantsburg	St. Louis	Rainey	
Lake Superior	Wadena	Chippewa	Wisconsin Valley	Langlade
Green Bay
Lake Michigan	Delavan	Harvard-Princeton	Peoria	Decatur
Lake Michigan	Minor lobes: Milwaukee, Two Rivers; Straits of Mackinac			
Saginaw
Lake Huron	East White	Miami	Scioto	
Lake Erie
Lake Ontario	Lake Champlain	Hudson River		
unnamed lobe in Quebec – New England	Connecticut Valley	Buzzards Bay	Cape Cod	Georges Bank

=== Cordilleran ice sheet ===
The Cordilleran Ice Sheet has left remnants throughout the Northern Rocky Mountains, covering British Columbia and reaching into northern Washington State and Montana. The Cordilleran ice sheet has more of an Alpine style of many glaciers merged into a whole. The striations made by the ice field in moving over the bedrock show that it moved principally to the west through the passes of the coast range.

=== Innuitian ice sheet ===
The Innuitian ice sheet was centered on the Queen Elizabeth Islands.

== Formation of proglacial and prehistoric lakes ==
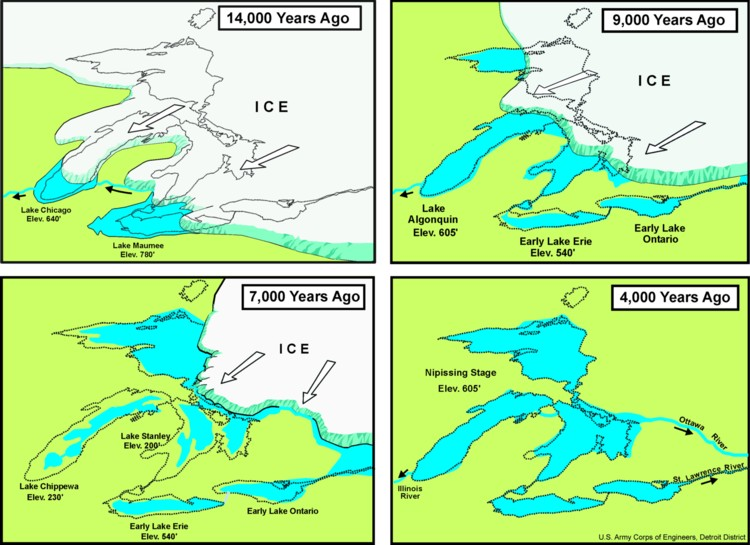
A diagram of the formation of the Great Lakes

Whenever the ice sheet melted from the north at a moraine, water would begin to pond in the divide between a moraine and the ice front. The ice would act as a dam as water could not drain through the ice sheet, which in the Wisconsin period covered most of the proglacial river valleys. Numerous small, isolated water bodies formed between the moraine and the ice front. As the ice sheet would continue to melt and recede northward, these ponds combined into proglacial lakes. In areas without an available outlet, the water levels would either continue to rise until reaching one or more low spots along the rim of a moraine, or the ice sheet would retreat, opening access to a lower portion of the moraine. Multiple outlets could form through low spots too until one would become dominant after erosion lowered both the outlet and lake surface.

=== Meltwater ===
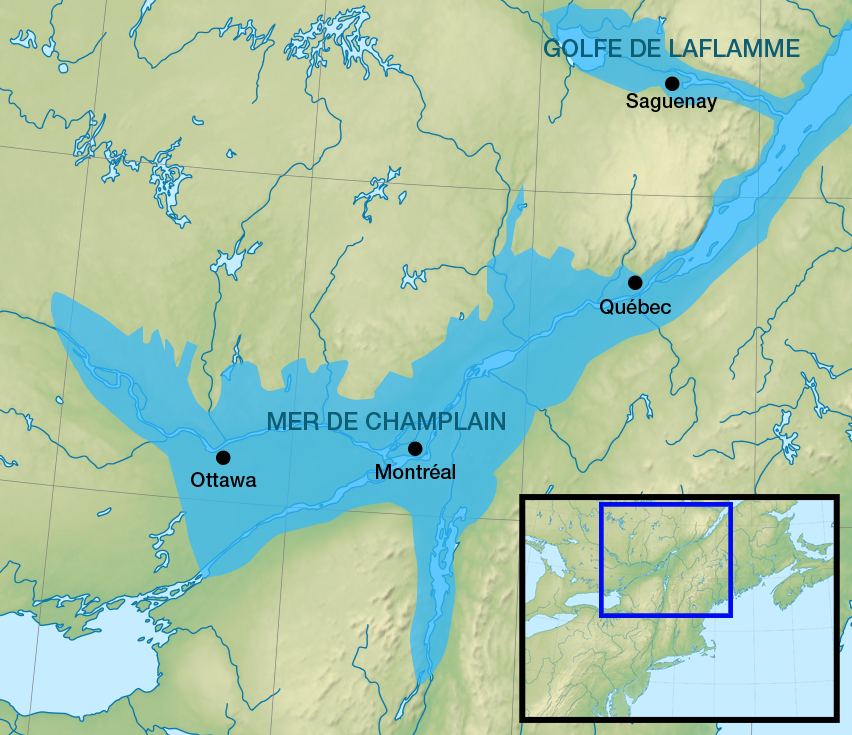
The Champlain Sea - The best evidence of this former sea is the vast clay plain deposited along the Ottawa and St. Lawrence Rivers.

Ice melt and rainfall carried large quantities of clay, sand, and gravel from the ice mass. Clays could be moved long distances by moving water, while sand and gravel could not. Thus, sand and gravel landforms developed along the sides and front of the ice sheet; elongated accumulations of this material are known as kames. Mounds along the frontal edge of the ice are called moraines. Wherever a subglacial tunnel began infilling, long winding formations known as eskers would form. The sweeping plain of sand and gravel beyond the ice margin and a terminal moraine is called an outwash plain . The materials left under the glacier when it melts back is called the ground moraine or till plain. Till is highly permeable and creates a large ground reserve for water. This formation is highly desirable for human economic development as a source of water.

== Stages of the Wisconsin episode ==
Table IV
Maxima of the Wisconsin ice sheets
Western Ice	Eastern Ice	Estimated years before present	Position of ice border
Mankato	Valders	25,000	Northern Washington, Idaho, and Montana to the Continental Divide – north of Edmonton – 65 miles east of Edmonton – northwest corner of North Dakota – Des Moines – west end of Lake Superior – Milwaukee – Port Huron – Buffalo – Schuylerville – St. Johnsbury.
(Great reduction of ice)	Cary	27,500	Minneapolis – north Wisconsin – south of Chicago – Central Ohio – 50 miles south of Buffalo – Binghamton - Northampton
(Great reduction of ice)	Tazewell	40,000	Rockford, Ill. – Peoria – south of Indianapolis – north of Cincinnati – northwestern Pennsylvania – central Long Island
Iowan	No known ice	65,500	Northern Washington, Idaho, and Montana – northwest North Dakota – east central Iowa - Minneapolis

== Role in human migration ==
Prehistoric human migration was likely greatly influenced by this last glacial period, as during much of the Wisconsin era, the formation of a land bridge known as Beringia across the Bering Strait is believed to have allowed human occupation of this area which provided potential access for some of the first humans to move between North America and Siberia in Asia (see Settlement of the Americas). Other human migration routes also opened during interglacial periods in both Europe and Asia.

== Flora and fauna ==
North American flora and fauna species were distributed quite differently during the Wisconsin era, due to altered temperatures, surface water distribution, and in some cases coverage of earth surface by glaciers. A number of scientific studies have been conducted to determine species distribution, particularly during the Late Wisconsin and early to mid-Holocene. An example of findings is from the investigation of flora species using pollen core samples in present-day California. Here in the Waterman Hills researchers found that Juniperus osteosperma and Pinus monophylla were early to mid-Holocene dominant trees, while Monardella arizonica has been a continuously present understory plant. Celtis reticulata is an example of a plant present in the early Holocene following Wisconsin glacial retreat, a species no longer present at the Waterman Mountains site.

== See also ==
- Driftless Area – Geological region in the Midwestern US
- Geology of Ontario
- Glacial history of Minnesota
- Glacial Lake Iroquois – Prehistoric lake that became Lake Ontario
- Ice Age Trail – Long-distance hiking trail in the United States
- Ice core – Cylindrical sample drilled from an ice sheet
- Last Glacial Period – Period of major glaciations of the Northern Hemisphere (115,000–11,700 years ago)
- Retreat of glaciers since 1850 – Recent shrinking of glaciers due to global warming
- Timeline of glaciation – Chronology of the major ice ages of the Earth
- Younger Dryas – Time period c. 12,900–11,700 years ago

=== Pleistocene historic names ===
Historical names of the "four major" glacials in four regions.
Region	Glacial 1	Glacial 2	Glacial 3	Glacial 4
Alps	Günz	Mindel	Riss	Würm
North Europe	Eburonian	Elsterian	Saalian	Weichselian
British Isles	Beestonian	Anglian	Wolstonian	Devensian
Midwest U.S.	Nebraskan	Kansan	Illinoian	Wisconsinan

Historical names of interglacials.
Region	Interglacial 1	Interglacial 2	Interglacial 3
Alps	Günz-Mindel	Mindel-Riss	Riss-Würm
North Europe	Waalian	Holsteinian	Eemian
British Isles	Cromerian	Hoxnian	Ipswichian
Midwest U.S.	Aftonian	Yarmouthian	Sangamonian

== External links and references ==
- Wisconsin Glacial Stage at the Encyclopædia Britannica
