= Elster glaciation =

Glacial period in Europe

Maximum extent of the ice sheet in Europe

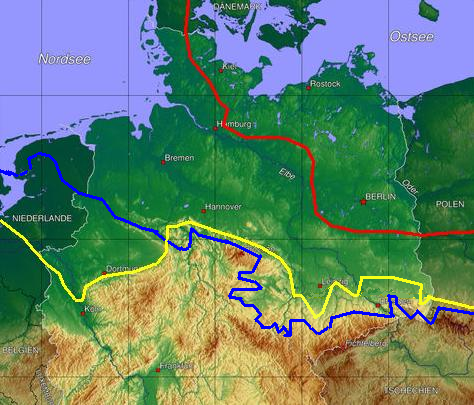
Schematic diagram of the maximum glaciation of the last three cold periods on the North German Plain: red line = extent of the Weichselian glaciation; yellow line = extent of the Saale glaciation; blue line = extent of the Elster glaciation

The Elster glaciation (German: Elster-Kaltzeit, Elster-Glazial or Elster-Zeit) or, less commonly, the Elsterian glaciation, in the older and popular scientific literature also called the Elster Ice Age (Elster-Eiszeit), is the oldest known ice age that resulted in the large-scale glaciation of North Germany and other parts of Europe. It occurred during Marine Isotope Stage 12, approximately 480,000–424,000 years ago, and is equivalent to the Anglian glaciation in Britain. It succeeded a long period of rather warmer average temperatures, the Cromerian Complex. The Elster was followed by the Holstein interglacial, which was followed Saale glaciation. The glacial period is named after the White Elster, a right tributary of the Saale.

== Controversial correlations ==
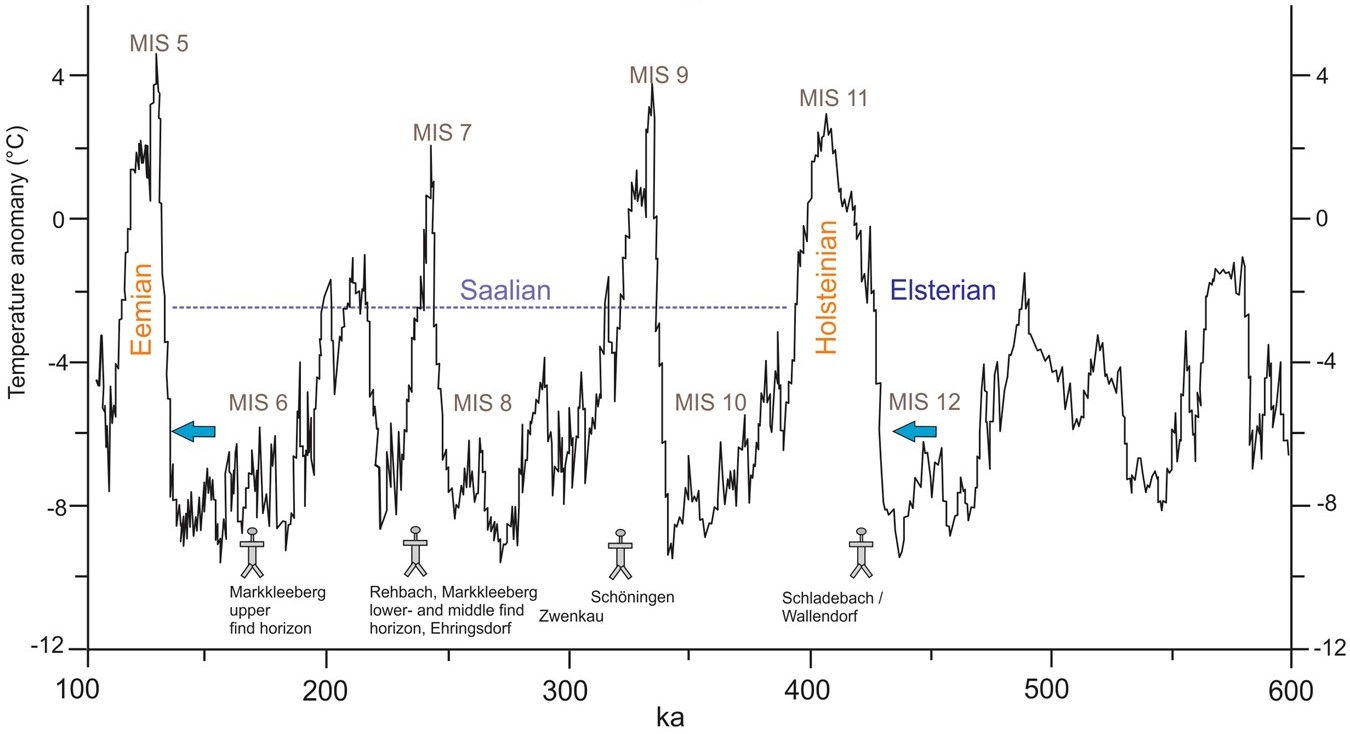
Graph showing the timing of the Elsterian glaciation in relation to other glacial cycles

Traditionally, Elster was correlated with the Mindel glaciation of the Alps and the Anglian glaciation of Great Britain and Ireland. Analysis in the 1950s of oxygen isotopes in deep sea core samples introduced a global glacial history, with warm and cold phases identified by marine isotope stages (MIS). This identified two glacial stages in the time slot of the Elster/Mindel/Anglian, namely MIS 12 and MIS 10. A lack of suitable isotopes for dating the glacial deposits has made it difficult to resolve the ambiguity. This has led to an increasingly controversial issue between the two main alternatives:

- MIS 12, 478–424 ka ago, is globally the stronger of the two glacials and long the preferred correlation to Elster/Mindel/Anglian. There is strong evidence for widespread glaciation of Great Britain during MIS 12, and only disputed and weak signs of glaciation during MIS 10. Thus, the correlation of the Anglian glaciation to MIS 12 is uncontroversial. The glacial history of Europe is much simplified if also Elster and Mindel are correlated to MIS 12. The Subcommission on Quaternary Stratigraphy (SQS) of the International Commission on Stratigraphy (ICS), a scientific organisation within the International Union of Geological Sciences (IUGS), correlates both the Anglian and the Elsterian to MIS 12 in the 2011 version of its correlation table.
- MIS 10, 374–337 ka ago, is globally a weaker glacial. A correlation of Elster to MIS 10 implies a complicated glacial history in Europe, with various geographical areas showing evidence from different glacials. However, different chronologies of separate ice streams during the late Weichselian glaciation gives credence to such a scenario. In the Netherlands there is evidence for correlations of Elster to both MIS 12 and MIS 10. A correlation to MIS 10 is given in the comprehensive review of the glaciations of northern Germany by Litt et al. (2007). Version 2016 of the correlation table by the German Stratigraphic Commission correlates both Elster and Mindel to MIS 10.

== See also ==
- Timeline of glaciation

== See also ==
- Pleistocene, which covers:

Historical names of the "four major" glacials in four regions.
Region	Glacial 1	Glacial 2	Glacial 3	Glacial 4
Alps	Günz	Mindel	Riss	Würm
North Europe	Eburonian	Elsterian	Saalian	Weichselian
British Isles	Beestonian	Anglian	Wolstonian	Devensian
Midwest U.S.	Nebraskan	Kansan	Illinoian	Wisconsinan

Historical names of interglacials.
Region	Interglacial 1	Interglacial 2	Interglacial 3
Alps	Günz-Mindel	Mindel-Riss	Riss-Würm
North Europe	Waalian	Holsteinian	Eemian
British Isles	Cromerian	Hoxnian	Ipswichian
Midwest U.S.	Aftonian	Yarmouthian	Sangamonian
