= Wolstonian Stage =

Glacial Period in Britain c,352,000 - c130,000

Wolstonian
- .374 – .130 Ma

Chronology
- Preceded by: Hoxnian
- Followed by: Ipswichian

Usage information
- Celestial body: Earth
- Regional usage: Regional
- Used by: United Kingdom

Definition
- Chronological unit: Age
- Stratigraphic unit: Stage

The Wolstonian Stage is a middle Pleistocene stage of the geological history of Earth from approximately 374,000 until 130,000 years ago. It precedes the Last Interglacial (also called the Eemian Stage) and follows the Hoxnian Stage in the British Isles.

It is also approximately analogous to the Warthe and Saalian stages in northern Europe; the Riss glaciation in the Alps; and the Illinoian Stage in North America. The colder last part from around 194,000 years ago is called the Penultimate Glacial Period.

It is equivalent to Marine isotope stages (MIS) 10 through 6. MIS 10, 8 and 6 were glacial periods and 9 and 7 were interglacials.

It is named after Wolston in the English county of Warwickshire.

== Description ==
The Wolstonian Stage is a middle Pleistocene stage of the geological history of Earth that precedes the Ipswichian Stage (Eemian Stage in Europe) and follows the Hoxnian Stage in the British Isles. The Wolstonian Stage apparently includes three periods of glaciation. The Wolstonian Stage is temporally analogous to the Warthe Stage and Saalian Stage in northern Europe and the Riss glaciation in the Alps, and temporally equivalent to all of the Illinoian Stage and the youngest part of the Pre-Illinoian Stage in North America. It is contemporaneous with the North American Pre-Illinoian A, Early Illinoian, and Late Illinoian glaciations.

The Wolstonian Stage is equivalent to Marine isotope stages 6 through 10.

Britain became an Island during this period (350,000 years ago).

It started 374,000 years ago and ended 130,000 years ago.

== Etymology ==
The Wolstonian Stage was named after the site of Wolston in the English county of Warwickshire where corresponding deposits were first identified.

== Archaeology ==
Acheulian flint tools have been found in Wolstonian deposits.

== Pleistocene glaciation ==
Historical names of the "four major" glacials in four regions.
Region	Glacial 1	Glacial 2	Glacial 3	Glacial 4
Alps	Günz	Mindel	Riss	Würm
North Europe	Eburonian	Elsterian	Saalian	Weichselian
British Isles	Beestonian	Anglian	Wolstonian	Devensian
Midwest U.S.	Nebraskan	Kansan	Illinoian	Wisconsinan

Historical names of interglacials.
Region	Interglacial 1	Interglacial 2	Interglacial 3
Alps	Günz-Mindel	Mindel-Riss	Riss-Würm
North Europe	Waalian	Holsteinian	Eemian
British Isles	Cromerian	Hoxnian	Ipswichian
Midwest U.S.	Aftonian	Yarmouthian	Sangamonian

== See also ==
- Glacial period
- Ice age
- Timeline of glaciation
