= Anglian stage =

Period of the Pleistocene epoch

Anglian
- 0.478 – 0.424 Ma

Usage information
- Celestial body: Earth
- Regional usage: Regional
- Time scale(s) used: British Isles
- Used by: United Kingdom

Definition
- Chronological unit: Age
- Stratigraphic unit: Stage

The Anglian Stage is the name used in the British Isles for a middle Pleistocene glaciation. It precedes the Hoxnian Stage and follows the Cromerian Stage in the British Isles. It correlates to Marine Isotope Stage 12 (MIS 12), which started about 478,000 years ago and ended about 424,000 years ago.

== Description ==
The Anglian stage has often been correlated to the Elsterian Stage of northern Continental Europe and the Mindel Stage in the Alps.

The Anglian was the most extreme glaciation during the last two million years. In Britain the ice sheet reached the Isles of Scilly and the Western Approaches, the furthest south the ice reached in any Pleistocene ice age. In the south-east of England it diverted the River Thames from its old course through the Vale of St Albans south to its present position, and in the London area the ice sheet reached as far south as Hornchurch and Finchley.

This stage had been equated to the Kansan Stage in North America. The stage names "Kansan", "Yarmouth", "Nebraskan" and "Aftonian" were later abandoned by North American Quaternary geologists and merged into the Pre-Illinoian stage. The Anglian Stage is now correlated with the period of time which includes the Pre-Illinoian B glaciation of North America.

== See also ==
- Glacial period
- Last glacial period
- Timeline of glaciation

== See also ==
- Pleistocene, which covers:

Historical names of the "four major" glacials in four regions.
Region	Glacial 1	Glacial 2	Glacial 3	Glacial 4
Alps	Günz	Mindel	Riss	Würm
North Europe	Eburonian	Elsterian	Saalian	Weichselian
British Isles	Beestonian	Anglian	Wolstonian	Devensian
Midwest U.S.	Nebraskan	Kansan	Illinoian	Wisconsinan

Historical names of interglacials.
Region	Interglacial 1	Interglacial 2	Interglacial 3
Alps	Günz-Mindel	Mindel-Riss	Riss-Würm
North Europe	Waalian	Holsteinian	Eemian
British Isles	Cromerian	Hoxnian	Ipswichian
Midwest U.S.	Aftonian	Yarmouthian	Sangamonian
