= Timeline of glaciation =

Chronology of the major ice ages of the Earth

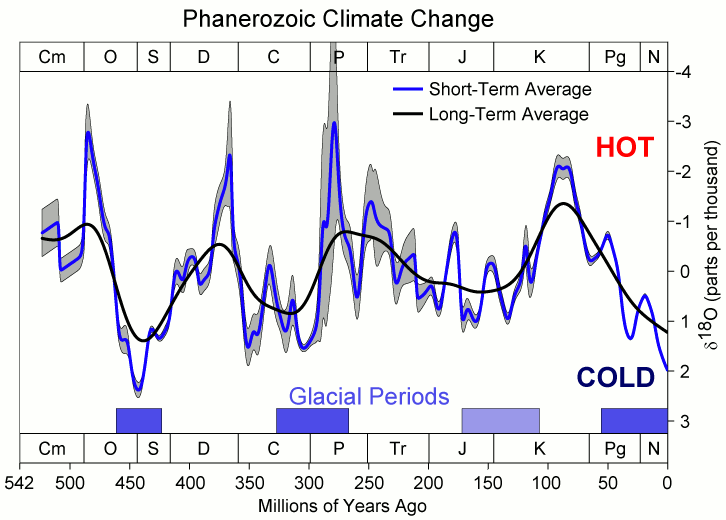
Climate history over the past 500 million years, with the last three major ice ages indicated, Hirnantian (450 Mya), Late Paleozoic (300 Mya), and the Late Cenozoic. A less severe cold period or ice age is shown during the Jurassic-Cretaceous (150 Mya).

The earth has been free of permanent ice sheets for most of its history, and there have been nine glacial periods over the past 3 billion years. The earth is now in the Late Cenozoic Ice Age, which began around 33.9 million years ago, when ice began to build up in the Antarctic. Its latest phase is the Quaternary glaciation, which started around 2.58 million years ago and is still ongoing.

Within ice ages, there exist periods of more severe glacial conditions and more temperate conditions, referred to as glacial periods and interglacial periods, respectively. Earth is currently in such an interglacial period of the Quaternary glaciation, with the Last Glacial Period of the Quaternary having ended around 11,700 years ago. The current interglacial is known as the Holocene epoch. Based on climate proxies, paleoclimatologists study the different climate states originating from glaciation.

== Known ice ages ==
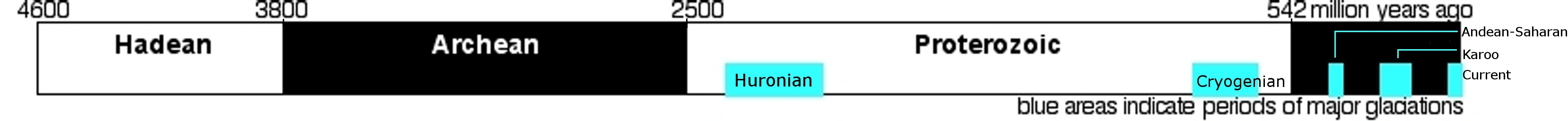

Name of ice age	Years ago	Period	Era
Pongola	2.985-2.837 Bya		Mesoarchean
Huronian	2.4–2.1 Bya	Siderian; Rhyacian	Paleoproterozoic
Sturtian	717–660 Mya	Cryogenian	Neoproterozoic
Marinoan	639-635 Mya	Cryogenian	Neoproterozoic
Gaskiers	579.88–579.63 Mya	Ediacaran	Neoproterozoic
Baykonurian	547–540 Mya	Ediacaran	Neoproterozoic
Hirnantian	460–420 Mya	Ordovician; Silurian	Paleozoic
Late Paleozoic icehouse	360–255 Mya	Carboniferous; Permian	Paleozoic
Late Cenozoic Ice Age	33.9 Mya–Present	Paleogene; Neogene; Quaternary	Cenozoic

== Descriptions ==
Life timeline
← / Earth formed; ← / Earliest water; ← / LUCA; ← / Earliest fossils; ← / Great Oxygenation Event; ← / Sexual reproduction; ← / Earliest fungi; ← / Neoproterozoic oxygenation event; ← / Ediacaran biota; ← / Cambrian explosion; ← / Earliest tetrapods; ← / Earliest hominoid
(million years ago)

The third ice age, and possibly most severe, is estimated to have occurred from around 717 to 660 million years ago, during the Cryogenian Period, and it has been suggested that it produced a second "Snowball Earth", i.e. a period during which Earth was completely covered in ice. It has also been suggested that the end of that second cold period was responsible for the subsequent Cambrian explosion, a time of rapid diversification of multi-cellular life during the Cambrian Period. The hypothesis is still controversial, though is gaining credence among researchers, as evidence in its favour has mounted.

The Hirnantian glaciation lasted from around 460 to 420 million years ago, and then the Late Paleozoic icehouse from around 360 to 255 million years ago.

The Late Cenozoic Ice Age has seen extensive ice sheets in Antarctica for the last 33.9 million years. During the last 3 million years, ice sheets have also developed on the northern hemisphere. That phase is known as the Quaternary glaciation, and was marked by more or less extensive glaciation. They first appeared with a dominant frequency of 41,000 years, but after the Mid-Pleistocene Transition that changed to high-amplitude cycles, with an average period of 100,000 years.

== Nomenclature of Quaternary glacial cycles ==
Whereas the first 30 million years of the Late Cenozoic Ice Age mostly involved Antarctica, the Quaternary has seen numerous ice sheets extending over parts of Europe and North America that are currently populated and easily accessible. Early geologists therefore named apparent sequences of glacial and interglacial periods of the Quaternary Ice Age after characteristic geological features, and these names varied from region to region. The marine record preserves all the past glaciations; the land-based evidence is less complete because successive glaciations may wipe out evidence of their predecessors. Ice cores from continental ice accumulations also provide a complete record, but do not go as far back in time as marine data. Pollen data from lakes and bogs as well as loess profiles provided important land-based correlation data. The names system has mostly been phased out by professionals. It is now more common for researchers to refer to the periods by their marine isotopic stage number. For example, there are five Pleistocene glacial/interglacial cycles recorded in marine sediments during the last half million years, but only three classic glacials were originally recognized on land during that period (Mindel, Riss, and Würm).

Land-based evidence works acceptably well back as far as MIS 6 (see Marine isotope stages, Stages), but it has been difficult to coordinate stages using just land-based evidence before that. Hence, the "names" system is incomplete and the land-based identifications of ice ages previous to that are somewhat conjectural. Nonetheless, land based data is essentially useful in discussing landforms, and correlating the known marine isotopic stage with them.

=== Historical nomenclature in the Alps ===
- Biber (2.6–1.8 Mya, Gelasian)
- Biber-Danube interglacial (not in use)
- Danube (1.8–1 Mya, Calabrian)
- Danube-Gunz interglacial (not in use)
- Günz (1–0.4 Mya, MIS 21 – MIS 11 ?)
- Günz-Haslach interglacial (not in use)
- Haslach (seldom used)
- Haslach-Mindel interglacial (not in use)
- Mindel (MIS 12?, MIS 10)
- Mindel-Riss interglacial (MIS 9)
- Riss (MIS 8-6)
- Riss-Würm interglacial (MIS 5e)
- Würm (MIS 5d-2)

=== Historical nomenclature in Great Britain and Ireland ===
- Bramertonian Stage
- Baventian Stage/Pre-Pastonian
- Pastonian Stage
- Beestonian stage
- Cromerian Stage (MIS 21-13 ?)
- Anglian Stage (MIS 12, perhaps also MIS 10 ?)
- Hoxnian Stage (MIS 11, perhaps also MIS 9 ?)
- Wolstonian Stage (MIS 8–6, perhaps also MIS 10–9 ?)
- Ipswichian interglacial (MIS 5e)
- Devensian glaciation (MIS 5d-2)
- Flandrian interglacial (MIS 1)

=== Historical nomenclature in Northern Europe ===
- Pre-Tiglian
- Tiglian interglacial
- Eburonian
- Waalian interglacial
- Menapian glacial stage
- Bavelian
- Cromerian complex (MIS 21-13 ?)
- Elster glaciation (MIS 12)
- Holstein interglacial (MIS 11)
- Saale glaciation (MIS 10-6)
- Eem interglacial (MIS 5e)
- Weichsel glaciation (MIS 5d-2)

=== Historical nomenclature in North America ===
- Nebraskan glaciation (replaced by Pre-Illinoian in modern scientific literature)
- Aftonian interglacial (replaced by Pre-Illinoian in modern scientific literature)
- Kansan glaciation (replaced by Pre-Illinoian in modern scientific literature)
- Yarmouthian (stage) (replaced by Pre-Illinoian in modern scientific literature)
- Illinoian stage (MIS 6)
- Sangamonian (MIS 5e, sometimes also 5d-5a)
- Wisconsin glaciation (MIS 4-2, sometimes also 5d-5a)

=== Historical nomenclature in South America ===
- Caracoles (Río Frío) glaciation
- Río Llico (Colegual) glaciation
- Santa María (Casma) glaciation
- Valdivia interglacial (MIS 5e)
- Llanquihue glaciation (at least MIS 4-2)

=== Uncertain correlations ===
It has proved difficult to correlate the traditional regional names with the global marine and ice core sequences. The indexes of MIS often identify several distinct glaciations that overlap in time with a single traditional regional glaciation. Some modern authors use the traditional regional glacial names to identify such a sequence of glaciations, whereas others replace the word "glaciation" with "complex" to refer to a continuous period of time that also includes warmer stages. As shown in the table below, it is only during the last 200,000-300,000 years that the time resolution of the traditional nomenclature allow for clear correspondence with MIS indexes. In particular there has been a lot of controversy regarding the glaciations MIS 10 and MIS 12, and their correspondence to the Elster and Mindel glaciations of Europe.

Marine isotope stage	Time ago (ka)	Regional names						Global age / epoch
Marine isotope stage	Time ago (ka)	Alpine region	Great Britain	N. Europe	E. Europe	N. America	S. America	Global age / epoch
MIS 103-64	2600–1800	Biber	Pre-Ludham; Ludham; Thurnian; Bramerton; Bavents; Paston	Pre-Tiglian; Tiglian A Tiglian B Tiglian C3; Tiglian C4; Tiglian C5	Verkhodon Khapry	Pre-illinois K Pre-illinois J		Gelasian
MIS 63-23	1800–900	Danube	Beeston	Eburon; Waal; Menap; Bavel	Tolucheevka Krinitsa	Pre-illinois I Pre-illinois H Pre-illinois G		Calabrian
MIS 22	900–866	Günz	Cromer	Cromer		Pre-illinois F		Calabrian
MIS 21	866–814	Günz	Cromer	Cromer		Pre-illinois		Calabrian
MIS 20	814–790	Günz	Cromer	Cromer		Pre-illinois E ?		Calabrian
MIS 19	790–761	Günz	Cromer	Cromer		Pre-illinois		Chibanian
MIS 18	761-712	Günz	Cromer	Cromer		Pre-illinois E ?		Chibanian
MIS 17	712-676	Günz	Cromer	Cromer		Pre-illinois		Chibanian
MIS 16	676–621	Günz	Cromer	Cromer/Don	Don	Pre-illinois D		Chibanian
MIS 15	621–563	Günz	Cromer	Cromer	Muchkap	Pre-illinois		Chibanian
MIS 14	563–533	Günz	Cromer	Cromer	Oka?	Pre-illinois C		Chibanian
MIS 13	533–478	Günz	Cromer	Cromer	Oka?	Pre-illinois		Chibanian
MIS 12	478–424	Günz Mindel?	Anglia	Elster Cromer?	Oka	Pre-illinois B	Caracoles Río Frío?	Chibanian
MIS 11	424–374	Günz?	Hoxne	Holstein Cromer/Rhume?	Likhvin	Pre-illinois		Chibanian
MIS 10	374–337	Mindel?	Wolston	Elster?	Likhvin?	Pre-illinois A ?	Río Llico Colegual?	Chibanian
MIS 9	337–300	Mindel-Riss?	Wolston Purfleet	Holstein?	Likhvin	Pre-illinois		Chibanian
MIS 8	300–243	Riss	Wolston	Saale/Fuhne	AC	Pre-illinois A ?		Chibanian
MIS 7	243–191	Riss	Wolston Aveley	Saale/Dömnitz Belvedere	AC	Pre-illinois		Chibanian
MIS 6	191–130	Riss	Wolston	Saale/Drenthe, Warthe	Dnieper/Moscow	Illinois	Santa María Casma?	Chibanian
MIS 5e	123 (peak)	Riss-Würm	Ipswich	Eem	Mikulino	Sangamonian	Valdivia	Late; Pleistocene ('Tarantian')
MIS 5d	109 (peak)	Würm	Devens/Early D.	Weichsel/Herning	Valdai	AC	AC	Late; Pleistocene ('Tarantian')
MIS 5c	96 (peak)	Würm	Devens/Early D.	Weichsel/Brørup	Valdai	AC	AC	Late; Pleistocene ('Tarantian')
MIS 5b	87 (peak)	Würm	Devens/Early D.	Weichsel/Rederstall	Valdai	AC	AC	Late; Pleistocene ('Tarantian')
MIS 5a	82 (peak)	Würm	Devens/Early D.	Weichsel/Odderade	Valdai	AC	AC	Late; Pleistocene ('Tarantian')
MIS 4	71–57	Würm	Devens/Middle D.	Weichsel/Middle W.	Valdai	Wisconsin	Llanquihue	Late; Pleistocene ('Tarantian')
MIS 3	57–29	Würm	Devens/Middle D.	Weichsel/Middle W.	Valdai	Wisconsin	Llanquihue	Late; Pleistocene ('Tarantian')
MIS 2	29–14	Würm/LGM	Devens/Dimlington	Weichsel/LGM	Valdai	Wisconsin/Vashon	Llanquihue/LGM	Late; Pleistocene ('Tarantian')
MIS 1	14–present	(Holocene)	Flandria	Flandria (Holocene)		(Holocene)	(Holocene)	Holocene

Table explanation
Extensive interglacial (similar to Holocene)
Moderate interglacial
Intermediate climate
Moderate glaciation
Extensive glaciation (similar to LGM)
AC = Ambiguous correlation

== See also ==
- Brunhes–Matuyama reversal – Most recent geomagnetic reversal event (780,000 years ago)
- Geologic time scale – System that relates geologic strata to time
- Glacial history of Minnesota
- Glacial period – Geological era
- Ice age – Period of long-term reduction in temperature of Earth's surface and atmosphere
- Last Glacial Period – Period of major glaciations of the Northern Hemisphere (115,000–11,700 years ago)
- Thermal history of Earth
- Geologic temperature record – Very long term changes in Earth's temperature
- List of periods and events in climate history
