= Pastonian Stage =

Stage of Pleistocene

The Pastonian interglacial, now called the Pastonian Stage (from Paston, Norfolk), is the name for an early or middle Pleistocene stage of geological history in the British Isles. It precedes the Beestonian Stage and follows the Pre-Pastonian Stage. Unfortunately the precise age of this stage cannot yet be defined in terms of absolute dating or MIS stages. The Pre-Pastonian Stage is equivalent to the Tiglian C5-6 Stage of Europe and the Pre-Illinoian I glaciation of the early Pre-Illinoian Stage of North America.

Deciduous woodland increased, including species such as Hornbeam (Carpinus), Elm (Ulmus), Hazel (Corylus), and Spruce (Picea). Towards the end of the period, there is evidence for a fall in sea levels and an increase in grassland species.

== See also ==
- Ice age
- Glacial period
- Last glacial period
- Timeline of glaciation
