= Mundesley Cliffs =

UK Site of Special Scientific Interest

Coordinates: 52.869°N 1.452°E

- Site of Special Scientific Interest
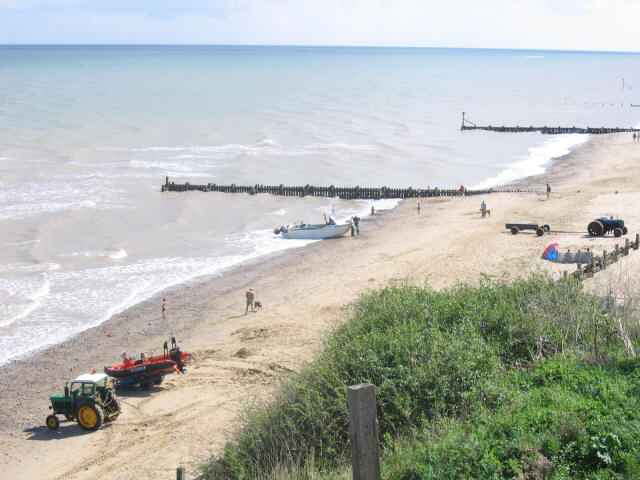
- Location of Mundesley Cliffs.
- Area of search: Norfolk, England
- Grid reference: TG 324 358
- Interest: Geological
- Area: 29.3 hectares (72 acres)
- Notification date: 1984
- Location map: Magic Map

Mundesley Cliffs is a 29.3-hectare (72-acre) geological Site of Special Scientific Interest north-east of North Walsham in Norfolk, England. It is a Geological Conservation Review site and it is in the Norfolk Coast Area of Outstanding Natural Beauty.

The cliffs on this site display some of the best marine and freshwater deposits dating to the Cromerian interglacial, and to the early stages of the succeeding Anglian glaciation, which started around 478,000 years ago.

The beach is open to the public.
