= Pre-Pastonian Stage =

The Pre-Pastonian Stage or Baventian Stage (from Easton Bavents in Suffolk), is the name for an early Pleistocene stage of geological history in the British Isles. It precedes the Pastonian Stage and follows the Bramertonian Stage. This stage ended 1.806 Ma (million years ago) at the end of Marine Isotope Stage 65. It is not currently known when this stage started. The Pre-Pastonian Stage is equivalent to the Tiglian C4c Stage of Europe and the Pre-Illinoian J glaciation of the early Pre-Illinoian Stage of North America.

Pollen evidence indicates that there were climatic fluctuations from cooler to warmer climates throughout this stage.

== See also ==
- Ice age
- Glacial period
- Last glacial period
- Timeline of glaciation
