= Flandrian interglacial =

Northwest European equivalent of the Holocene epoch

The Flandrian interglacial or stage is the regional name given by geologists and archaeologists in the British Isles to the period from around 12,000 years ago, at the end of the last glacial period, to the present day. As such, it is in practice identical in span to the Holocene (the present geological epoch).

The Flandrian began as the relatively short-lived Younger Dryas climate downturn came to an end. This was the last phase of the Devensian glaciation, the final stage of the Pleistocene epoch. The Flandrian is traditionally seen as the latest warm interglacial in a series that has been occurring throughout the Quaternary geological period.

The first part of the Flandrian, known as the Younger Atlantic, was a period of fairly rapid sea level rise, known as the Flandrian transgression. It is associated with the melting of the Fenno-Scandian, Scottish, Laurentide and Cordilleran glaciers. Fjords were formed during the Flandrian transgression when U-shaped glaciated valleys were inundated.

Milankovitch theory alone would forecast that the present Flandrian climate, like that of other interstadials, should eventually decline in temperature, towards a global climate similar to that of the Last Glacial Maximum. Less orbital eccentricity might have the effect of moderating this temperature downturn. However, orbital cycles are not the only influence on global temperature; atmospheric greenhouse gases also affect the radiative forcing. While there is agreement that post-Industrial Revolution greenhouse gas emissions are substantially warming the planet, there is debate over whether early agriculture, beginning thousands of years earlier, has had a much smaller warming effect (due to methane emissions from rice paddies, or deforestation, for instance). If this is the case, the climate of at least the later Holocene has long deviated from what would be expected with only orbital forcings, and the Flandrian has long been an atypical interglacial.
