= Last Glacial Period =

Period of major glaciations of the Northern Hemisphere (115,000–11,700 years ago)

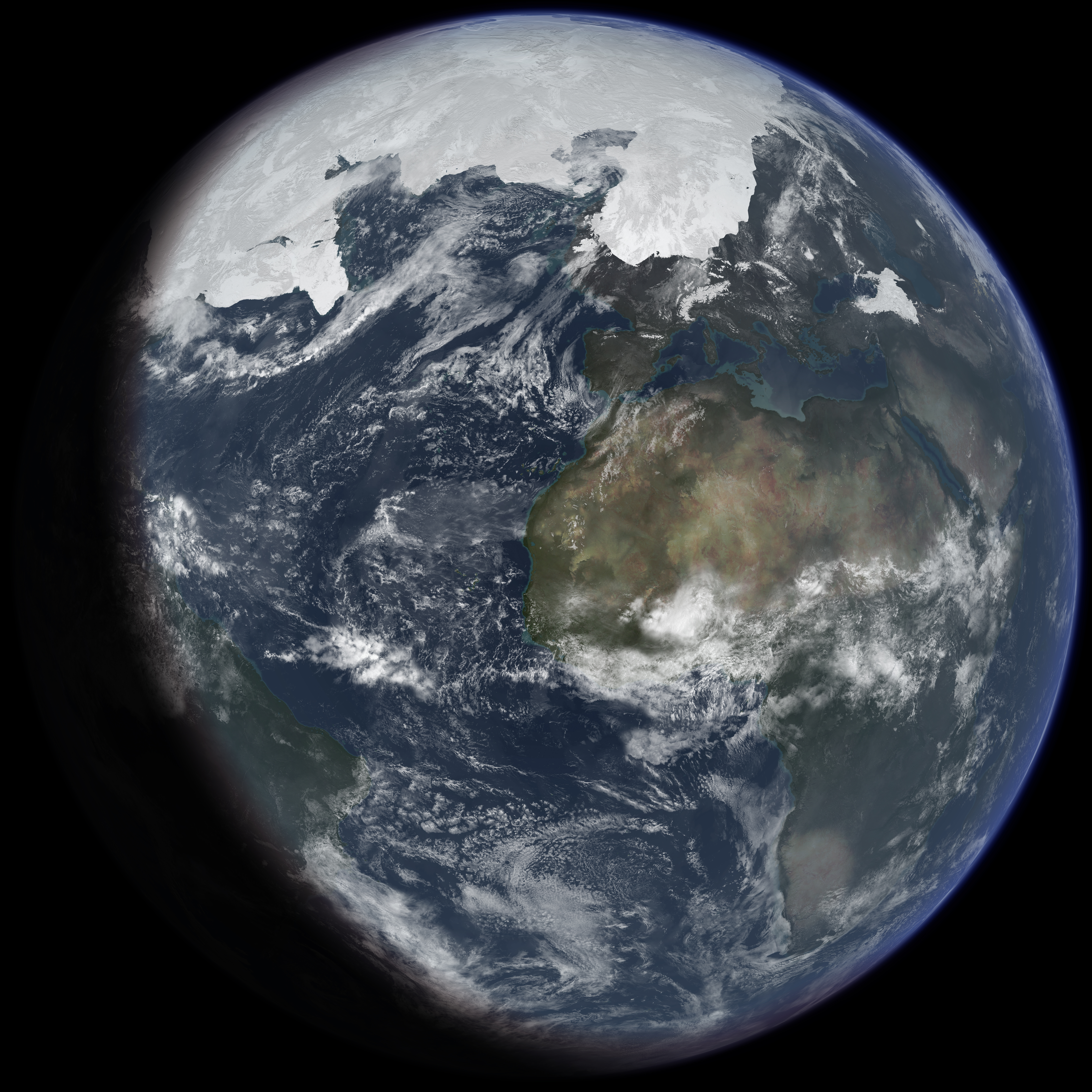
Artist's impression of the last glacial period at glacial maximum

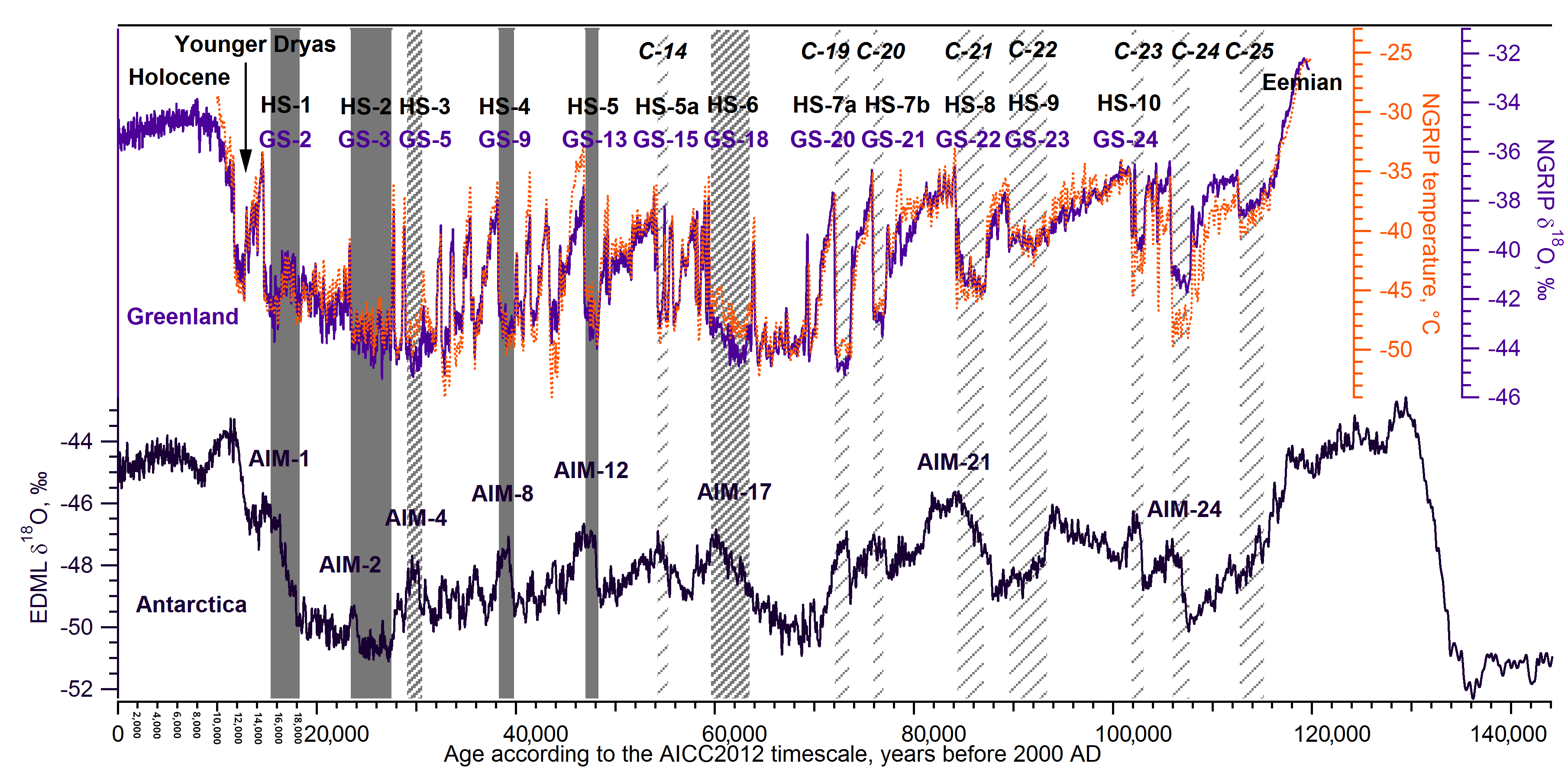
A chronology of climatic events of importance for the Last Glacial Period, about the last 120,000 years

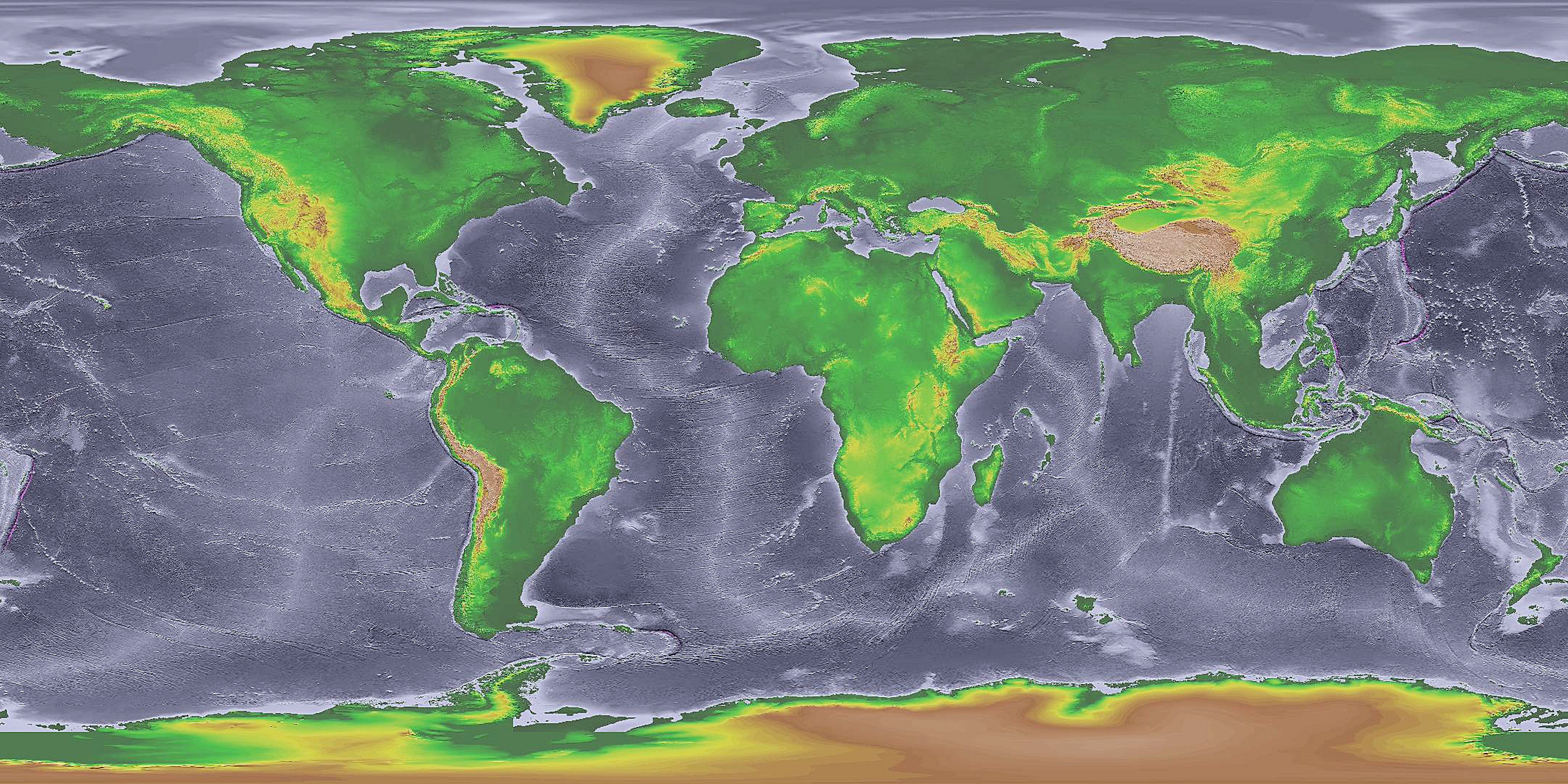
The Last Glacial Period caused a much lower global sea level

The Last Glacial Period (LGP), also known as the last glacial cycle, occurred from the end of the Last Interglacial to the beginning of the Holocene, from around 115,000–11,700 years ago, and thus corresponds to most of the timespan of the Late Pleistocene.

The LGP is part of a larger sequence of glacial and interglacial periods known as the Quaternary glaciation which started around 2.58 million years ago and is ongoing. The glaciation and the current Quaternary Period both began with the formation of the Arctic ice cap. The Antarctic ice sheet began to form earlier, around 33.9 million years ago in the mid-Cenozoic (Eocene–Oligocene extinction event), and the term Late Cenozoic Ice Age is used to include this early phase with the current glaciation. The previous ice age within the Quaternary is the Penultimate Glacial Period, which ended around 128,000 years ago, was more severe than the Last Glacial Period in some areas such as Great Britain, but less severe in others.

The last glacial period saw alternating episodes of glacier advance and retreat with the Last Glacial Maximum occurring between 26,000 and 20,000 years ago. While the general pattern of cooling and glacier advance around the globe was similar, local differences make it difficult to compare the details from continent to continent (see picture of ice core data below for differences). The most recent cooling, the Younger Dryas, began around 12,800 years ago and ended around 11,700 years ago, also marking the end of the LGP and the Pleistocene epoch. It was followed by the Holocene, the current geological epoch.

== Origin and definition ==
The LGP has been intensively studied in North America, Eurasia, and other formerly glaciated regions around the world. The glaciations that occurred during this glacial period covered many areas, mainly in the Northern Hemisphere and to a lesser extent in the Southern Hemisphere. They have different names, historically developed and depending on their geographic distributions: Fraser (in the Pacific Cordillera of North America), Pinedale (in the Central Rocky Mountains), Wisconsinan or Wisconsin (in central North America), Devensian (in the British Isles), Midlandian (in Ireland), Würm (in the Alps), Mérida (in Venezuela), Weichselian or Vistulian (in Northern Europe and northern Central Europe), Valdai and Zyryanka in Russia, Llanquihue in Chile, and Otira in New Zealand. The geochronological Late Pleistocene includes the late glacial (Weichselian) and the immediately preceding penultimate interglacial (Eemian) period.

== Overview ==
Vegetation types at the time of the Last Glacial Maximum

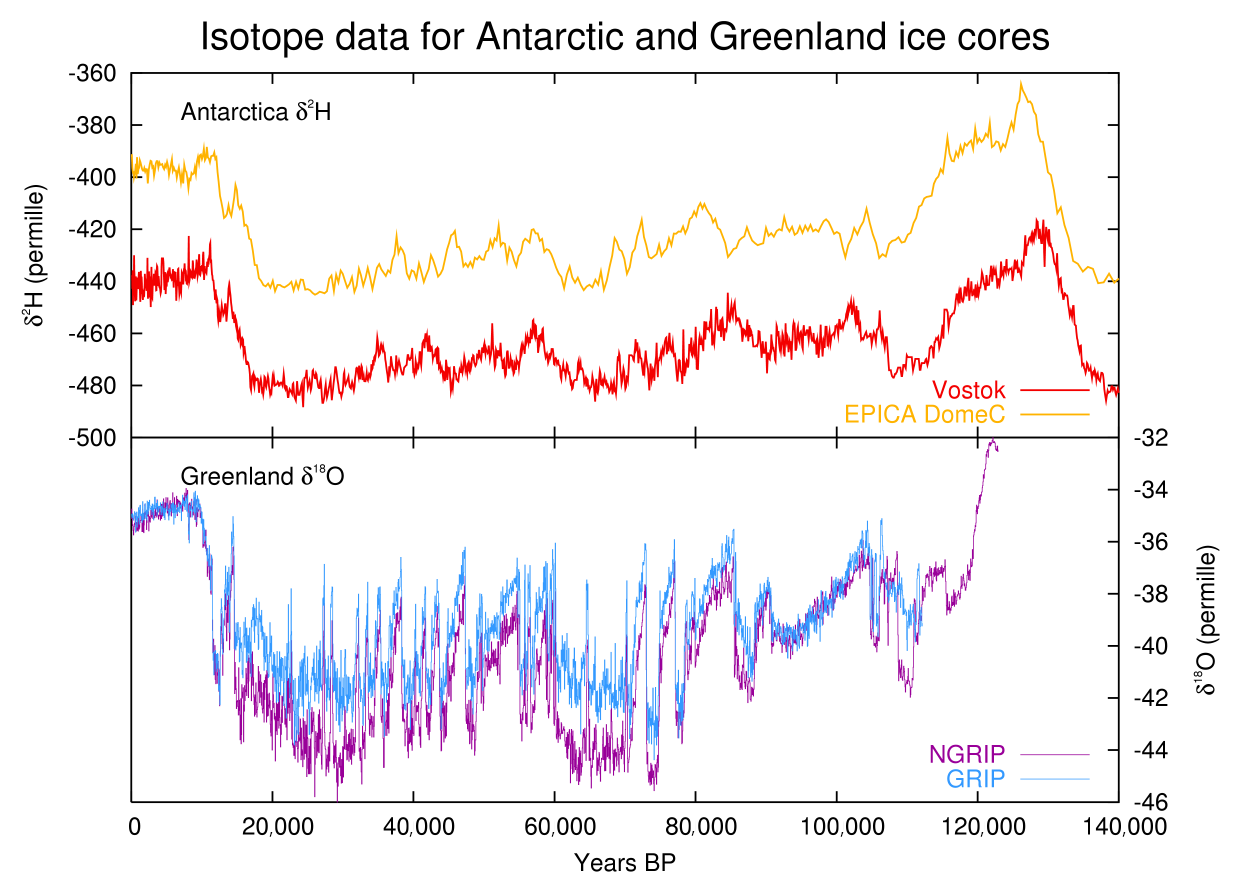
Last glacial period, as seen in ice core data from Antarctica and Greenland

=== Northern Hemisphere ===
Canada was almost completely covered by ice, as was the northern part of the United States, both blanketed by the huge Laurentide Ice Sheet. Alaska remained mostly ice free due to arid climate conditions. Local glaciations existed in the Rocky Mountains and the Cordilleran ice sheet and as ice fields and ice caps in the Sierra Nevada in northern California. In northern Eurasia, the Scandinavian ice sheet once again reached the northern parts of the British Isles, Germany, Poland, and Russia, extending as far east as the Taymyr Peninsula in western Siberia.

The maximum extent of western Siberian glaciation was reached by around 18,000 to 17,000 years ago, later than in Europe (22,000–18,000 ya). Northeastern Siberia was not covered by a continental-scale ice sheet. Instead, large, but restricted, icefield complexes covered mountain ranges within northeast Siberia, including the Kamchatka-Koryak Mountains.

The Arctic Ocean between the huge ice sheets of North America and Eurasia was not frozen throughout, but like today, probably was covered only by relatively shallow ice, subject to seasonal changes and riddled with icebergs calving from the surrounding ice sheets. According to the sediment composition retrieved from deep-sea cores, even times of seasonally open waters must have occurred.

Outside the main ice sheets, widespread glaciation occurred on the highest mountains of the Alpide belt. In contrast to the earlier glacial stages, the Würm glaciation was composed of smaller ice caps and mostly confined to valley glaciers, sending glacial lobes into the Alpine foreland. Local ice fields or small ice sheets could be found capping the highest massifs of the Pyrenees, the Carpathian Mountains, the Balkan Mountains, the Caucasus, and the mountains of Turkey and Iran.

In the Himalayas and the Tibetan Plateau, there is evidence that glaciers advanced considerably, particularly between 47,000 and 27,000 years ago, but the exact ages, as well as the formation of a single contiguous ice sheet on the Tibetan Plateau, is controversial.

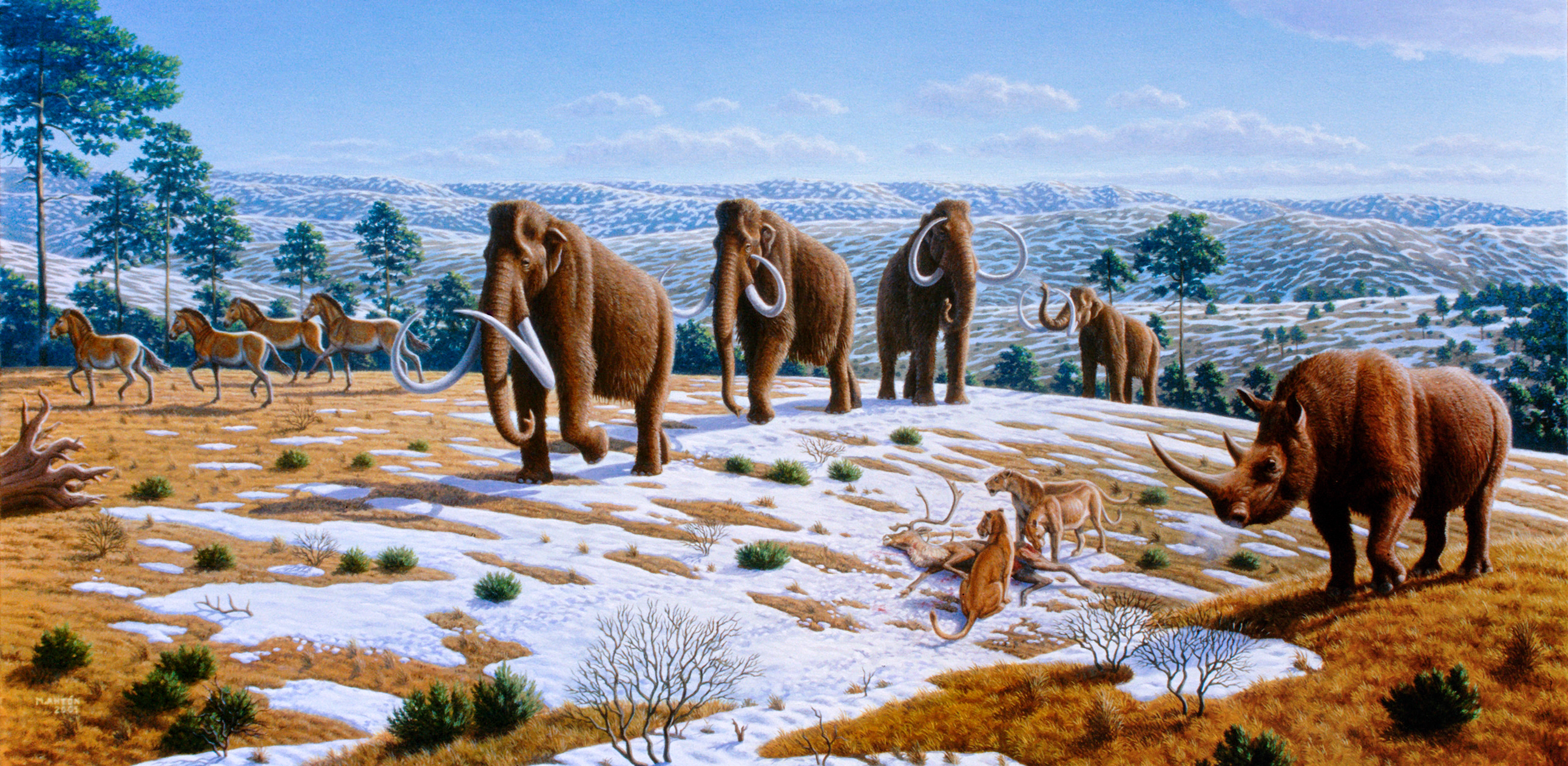
The Late Pleistocene saw extinctions of numerous predominantly megafaunal species, coinciding in time with the early human migrations across continents

Other areas of the Northern Hemisphere did not bear extensive ice sheets, but local glaciers were widespread at high altitudes. Parts of Taiwan, for example, were repeatedly glaciated between 44,250 and 10,680 BP as well as the Japanese Alps. In both areas, maximum glacier advance occurred between 60,000 and 30,000 years ago. To a still lesser extent, glaciers existed in Africa, for example in the High Atlas, the mountains of Morocco, the Mount Atakor massif in southern Algeria, and several mountains in Ethiopia. Just south of the equator, an ice cap of several hundred square kilometers was present on the east African mountains in the Kilimanjaro massif, Mount Kenya, and the Rwenzori Mountains, which still bear relic glaciers today.

=== Southern Hemisphere ===
Glaciation of the Southern Hemisphere was less extensive. Ice sheets existed in the Andes (Patagonian Ice Sheet), where six glacier advances between 33,500 and 13,900 years ago in the Chilean Andes have been reported. Antarctica was entirely glaciated, much like today, but unlike today the ice sheet left no uncovered area. In mainland Australia only a very small area in the vicinity of Mount Kosciuszko was glaciated, whereas in Tasmania glaciation was more widespread. An ice sheet formed in New Zealand, covering all of the Southern Alps, where at least three glacial advances can be distinguished.

Local ice caps existed in the highest mountains of the island of New Guinea, where temperatures were 5 to 6 °C colder than at present. The main areas of Papua New Guinea where glaciers developed during the LGP were the Central Cordillera, the Owen Stanley Range, and the Saruwaged Range. Mount Giluwe in the Central Cordillera had a "more or less continuous ice cap covering about 188 km^{2} and extending down to 3200-3500 m". In Western New Guinea, remnants of these glaciers are still preserved atop Puncak Jaya and Ngga Pilimsit.

Small glaciers developed in a few favorable places in Southern Africa during the last glacial period. (Note: Prior to the 2010s, considerable debate arose on whether Southern Africa was glaciated during the last glacial cycle or not.) (Note: The former existence of large glaciers or deep snow cover over much of the Lesotho Highlands has been judged unlikely considering the lack of glacial morphology (e.g. roche moutonnées) and the existence of periglacial regolith that has not been reworked by glaciers. Estimates of the mean annual temperature in Southern Africa during the last glacial maximum indicate the temperatures were not low enough to initiate or sustain a widespread glaciation. The former existence of rock glaciers or large glaciers is, according to the same study, ruled out, because of a lack of conclusive field evidence and the implausibility of the 10–17 °C temperature drop, relative to the present, that such features would imply.) These small glaciers would have been located in the Lesotho Highlands and parts of the Drakensberg. The development of glaciers was likely aided in part due to shade provided by adjacent cliffs. Various moraines and former glacial niches have been identified in the eastern Lesotho Highlands a few kilometres west of the Great Escarpment, at altitudes greater than 3,000 m on south-facing slopes. Studies suggest that the annual average temperature in the mountains of Southern Africa was about 6 °C colder than at present, in line with temperature drops estimated for Tasmania and southern Patagonia during the same time. This resulted in an environment of relatively arid periglaciation without permafrost, but with deep seasonal freezing on south-facing slopes. Periglaciation in the eastern Drakensberg and Lesotho Highlands produced solifluction deposits and blockfields; including blockstreams and stone garlands.

== Deglaciation ==
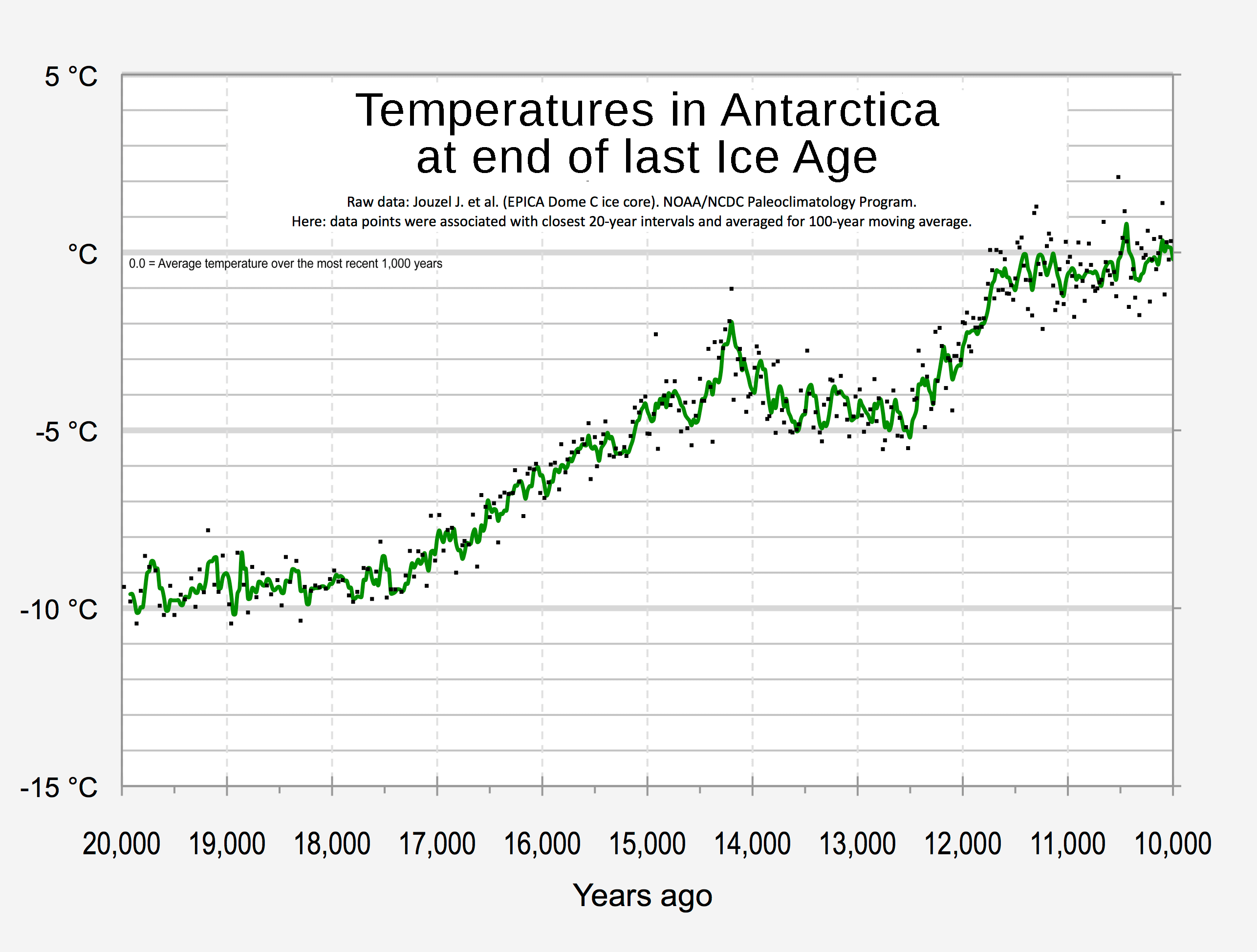
A temperature rise marking the end of the most recent ice age, as derived from ice core data

Scientists from the Center for Arctic Gas Hydrate, Environment and Climate at the University of Tromsø, published a study in June 2017 describing over a hundred ocean sediment craters, some 3 km wide and up to 300 meters deep, formed by explosive eruptions of methane from destabilized methane hydrates, following ice-sheet retreat during the LGP, around 10,000 BC. These areas around the Barents Sea still seep methane today. The study hypothesized that existing bulges containing methane reservoirs could eventually have the same fate.

== Named local glaciations ==
=== Antarctica ===
During the last glacial period, Antarctica was blanketed by a massive ice sheet, much as it is today. The ice covered all land areas and extended into the ocean onto the middle and outer continental shelf. Counterintuitively though, according to ice modeling done in 2002, ice over central East Antarctica was generally thinner than it is today.

=== Europe ===
==== Devensian and Midlandian glaciation (Britain and Ireland) ====
British geologists refer to the LGP as the Devensian. Irish geologists, geographers, and archaeologists refer to the Midlandian glaciation, as its effects in Ireland are largely visible in the Irish Midlands. The name Devensian is derived from the Latin Dēvenses, people living by the Dee (Dēva in Latin), a river on the Welsh border near which deposits from the period are particularly well represented.

The effects of this glaciation can be seen in many geological features of England, Wales, Scotland, and Northern Ireland. Its deposits have been found overlying material from the preceding Ipswichian stage and lying beneath those from the following Holocene, which is the current stage. This is sometimes called the Flandrian interglacial in Britain.

The latter part of the Devensian includes pollen zones I–IV, the Allerød oscillation and Bølling oscillation, and the Oldest Dryas, Older Dryas, and Younger Dryas cold periods.

==== Weichselian glaciation (Scandinavia and northern Europe) ====
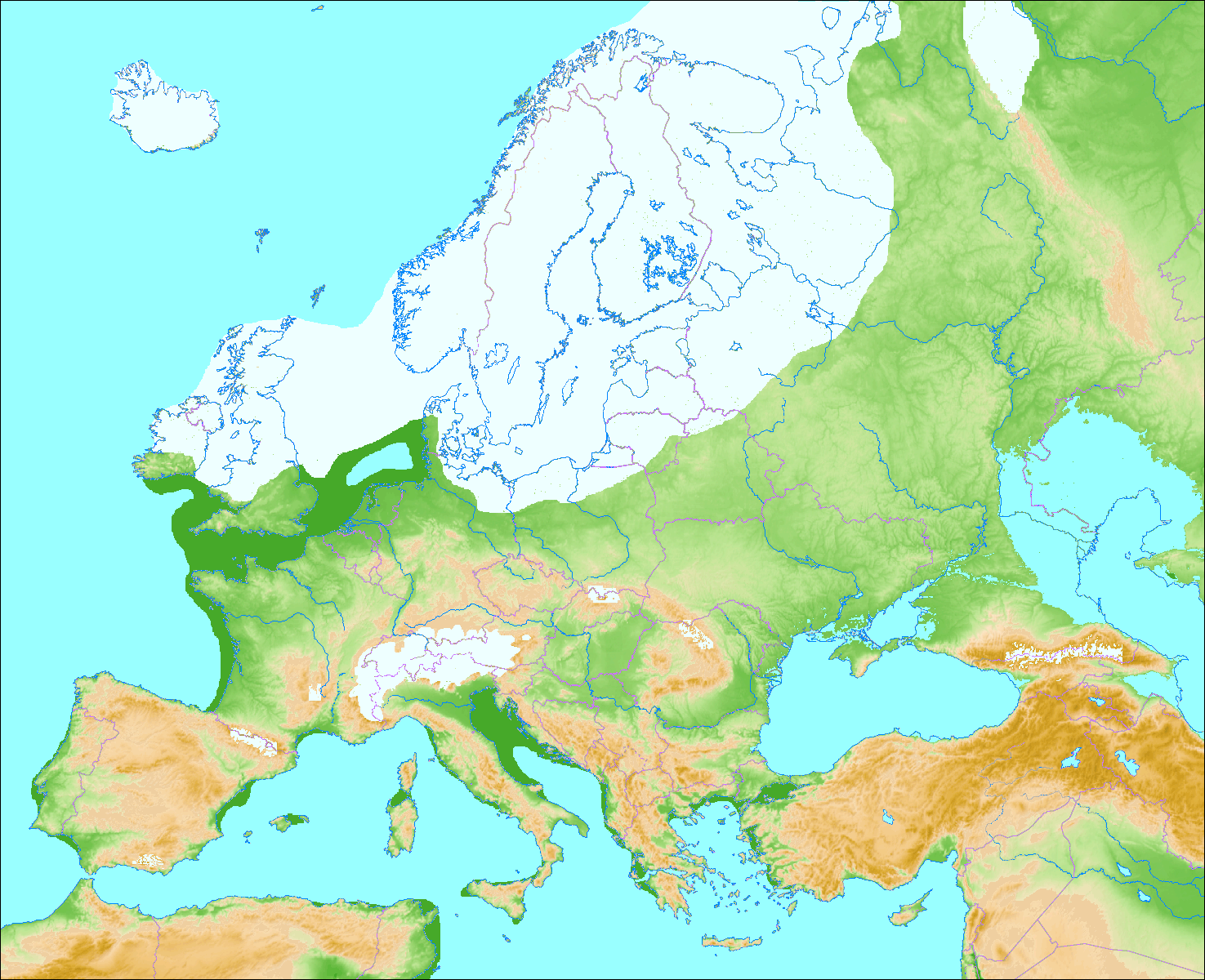
Europe during the last glacial period

Alternative names include Weichsel glaciation or Vistulian glaciation (referring to the Vistula River or its German name Weichsel). Evidence suggests that the ice sheets were at their maximum size for only a short period, between 25,000 and 13,000 years ago. Eight interstadials have been recognized in the Weichselian, including the Oerel, Glinde, Moershoofd, Hengelo, and Denekamp. Correlation with isotope stages is still in process. During the glacial maximum in Scandinavia, only the western parts of Jutland were ice-free, and a large part of what is today the North Sea was dry land connecting Jutland with Britain (see Doggerland).

The Baltic Sea, with its unique brackish water, is a result of meltwater from the Weichsel glaciation combining with saltwater from the North Sea when the straits between Sweden and Denmark opened. Initially, when the ice began melting around 8300 BC, seawater filled the isostatically depressed area, a temporary marine incursion that geologists dub the Yoldia Sea. Then, as postglacial isostatic rebound lifted the region around 7500 BC, the deepest basin of the Baltic became a freshwater lake, in palaeological contexts referred to as Ancylus Lake, which is identifiable in the freshwater fauna found in sediment cores.

The lake was filled by glacial runoff, but as worldwide sea level continued rising, saltwater again breached the sill around 6000 BC, forming a marine Littorina Sea, which was followed by another freshwater phase before the present brackish marine system was established. "At its present state of development, the marine life of the Baltic Sea is less than about 4000 years old", Drs. Thulin and Andrushaitis remarked when reviewing these sequences in 2003.

Overlying ice had exerted pressure on the Earth's surface. As a result of melting ice, the land has continued to rise yearly in Scandinavia, mostly in northern Sweden and Finland, where the land is rising at a rate of as much as 8–9 mm per year, or 1 meter in 100 years. This is important for archaeologists, since a site that was coastal in the Nordic Stone Age now is inland and can be dated by its relative distance from the present shore.

==== Würm glaciation (Alps) ====
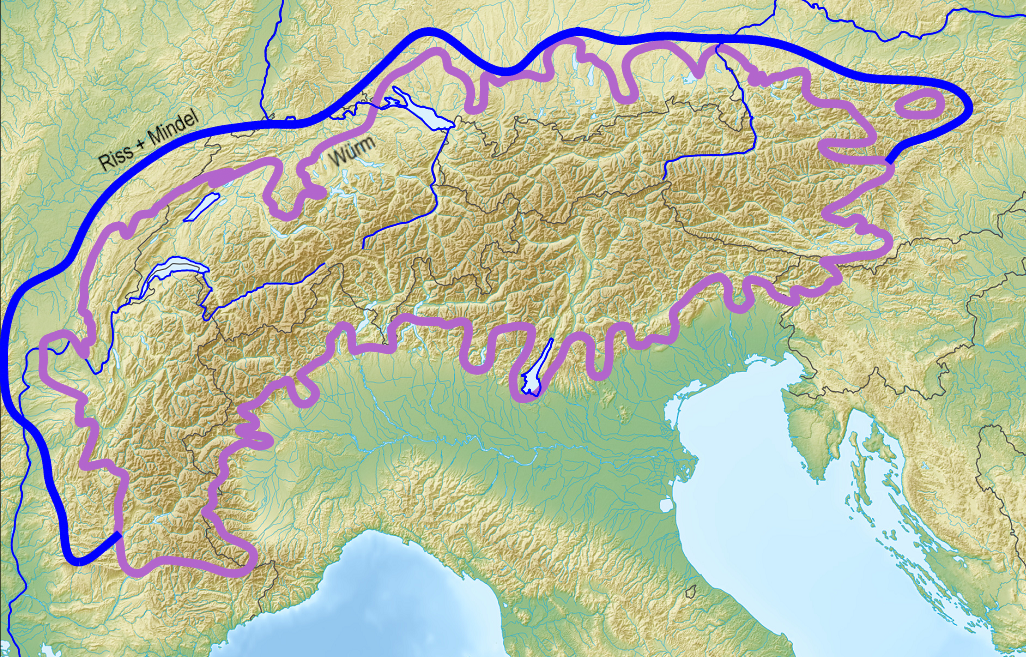
Violet: the extent of the Alpine ice sheet in the Würm glaciation. Blue: extent in earlier glacial periods.

The term Würm is derived from Würm, a river in the Alpine foreland, roughly marking the maximum glacier advance of this particular glacial period. The Alps were where the first systematic scientific research on ice ages was conducted by Louis Agassiz at the beginning of the 19th century. Here, the Würm glaciation of the LGP was intensively studied. Pollen analysis, the statistical analyses of microfossilized plant pollens found in geological deposits, chronicled the dramatic changes in the European environment during the Würm glaciation. During the height of Würm glaciation, most of western and central Europe and Eurasia was open steppe-tundra, while the Alps presented solid ice fields and montane glaciers. Scandinavia and much of Britain were under ice.

During the Würm, the Rhône Glacier covered the whole western Swiss plateau, reaching today's regions of Solothurn and Aargau. In the region of Bern, it merged with the Aar glacier. The Rhine Glacier is currently the subject of the most detailed studies. Glaciers of the Reuss and the Limmat advanced sometimes as far as the Jura. Montane and piedmont glaciers formed the land by grinding away virtually all traces of the older Günz and Mindel glaciation, by depositing base moraines and terminal moraines of different retraction phases and loess deposits, and by the proglacial rivers' shifting and redepositing gravels. Beneath the surface, they had profound and lasting influence on geothermal heat and the patterns of deep groundwater flow.

=== North America ===
==== Fraser and Pinedale glaciation (Rocky Mountains) ====
A map of Pleistocene lakes in the Great Basin of western North America, showing the path of the Bonneville Flood along the Snake River

The Pinedale (central Rocky Mountains) and Fraser (Cordilleran ice sheet) glaciation was the last of the major glaciations to appear in the Rocky Mountains in the United States. The Pinedale lasted from around 30,000 to 10,000 years ago, and was at its greatest extent between 23,500 and 21,000 years ago. This glaciation was somewhat distinct from the main Wisconsin glaciation, as it was only loosely related to the giant continental ice sheets and was instead composed of mountain glaciers, merging to comprise the Cordilleran ice sheet.

The Cordilleran ice sheet produced features such as glacial Lake Missoula, which broke free from its ice dam, causing the massive Missoula Floods. USGS geologists estimate that the cycle of flooding and reformation of the lake lasted an average of 55 years and that the floods occurred about 40 times over the 2,000-year period starting around 15,000 years ago. Glacial lake outburst floods such as these are not uncommon today in Iceland and other places.

==== Wisconsin glaciation ====
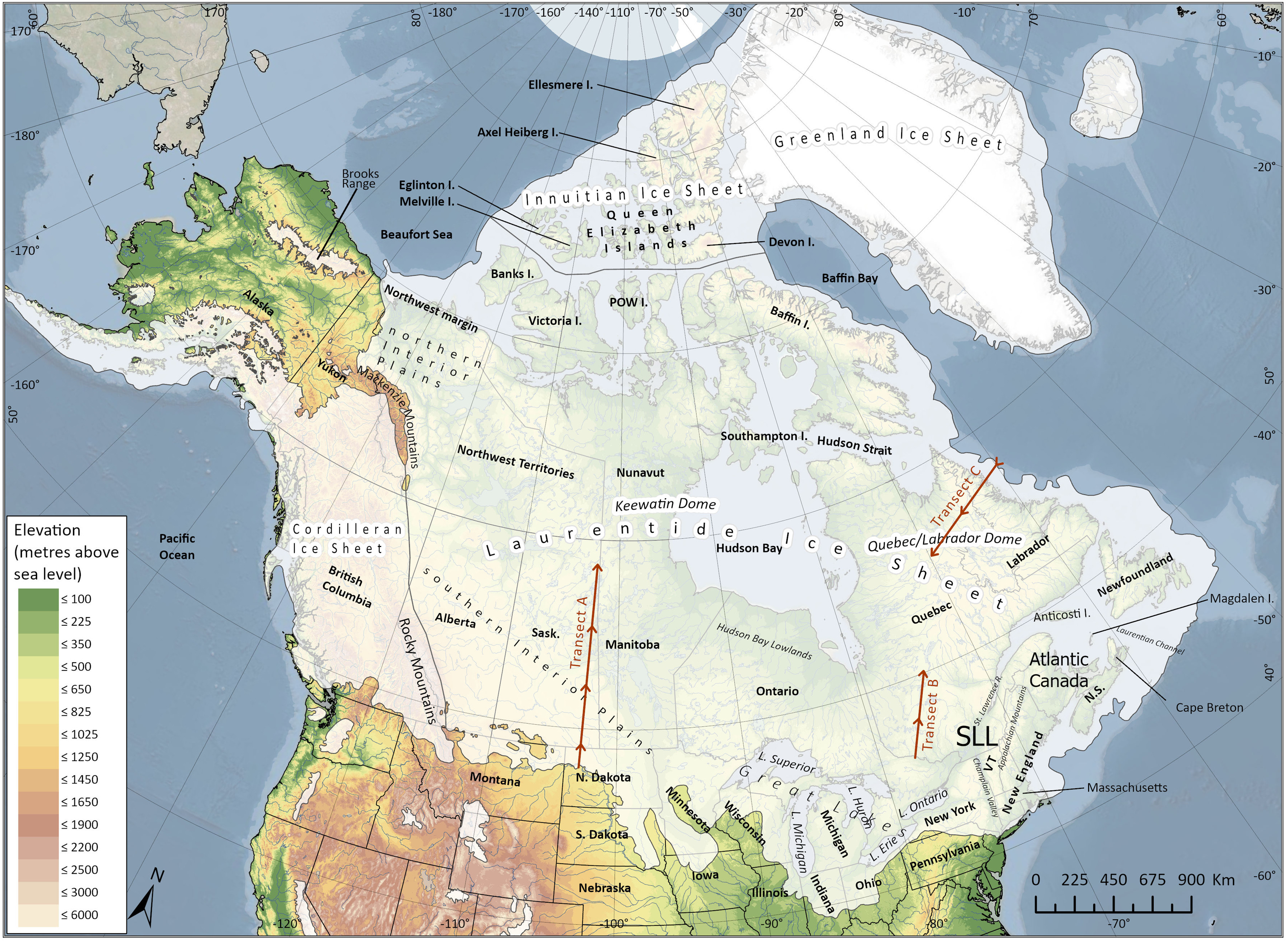
Maximum extent of the North American ice sheets during the Last Glacial Maximum around 20,000 years ago

The Wisconsin glacial episode was the last major advance of continental glaciers in the North American Laurentide ice sheet. At the height of glaciation, the Bering land bridge potentially permitted migration of mammals, including people, to North America from Siberia.

It radically altered the geography of North America north of the Ohio River. At the height of the Wisconsin episode glaciation, ice covered most of Canada, the Upper Midwest, and New England, as well as parts of Montana and Washington. On Kelleys Island in Lake Erie or in New York's Central Park, the grooves left by these glaciers can be easily observed. In southwestern Saskatchewan and southeastern Alberta, a suture zone between the Laurentide and Cordilleran ice sheets formed the Cypress Hills, which is the northernmost point in North America that remained south of the continental ice sheets.

The Great Lakes are the result of glacial scour and pooling of meltwater at the rim of the receding ice. When the enormous mass of the continental ice sheet retreated, the Great Lakes began gradually moving south due to isostatic rebound of the north shore. Niagara Falls is also a product of the glaciation, as is the course of the Ohio River, which largely supplanted the prior Teays River.

With the assistance of several very broad glacial lakes, it released floods through the gorge of the Upper Mississippi River, which in turn was formed during an earlier glacial period.

In its retreat, the Wisconsin episode glaciation left terminal moraines that form Long Island, Block Island, Cape Cod, Nomans Land, Martha's Vineyard, Nantucket, Sable Island, and the Oak Ridges Moraine in south-central Ontario, Canada. In Wisconsin itself, it left the Kettle Moraine. The drumlins and eskers formed at its melting edge are landmarks of the lower Connecticut River Valley.

==== Tahoe, Tenaya, and Tioga, Sierra Nevada ====
In the Sierra Nevada, three stages of glacial maxima, sometimes incorrectly called ice ages, were separated by warmer periods. These glacial maxima are called, from oldest to youngest, Tahoe, Tenaya, and Tioga. The Tahoe reached its maximum extent perhaps about 70,000 years ago. Little is known about the Tenaya. The Tioga was the least severe and last of the Wisconsin episode. It began about 30,000 years ago, reached its greatest advance 21,000 years ago, and ended about 10,000 years ago.

==== Greenland glaciation ====
In northwest Greenland, ice coverage attained a very early maximum in the LGP around 114,000. After this early maximum, ice coverage was similar to today until the end of the last glacial period. Towards the end, glaciers advanced once more before retreating to their present extent. According to ice core data, the Greenland climate was dry during the LGP, with precipitation reaching perhaps only 20% of today's value.

=== South America ===
==== Mérida glaciation (Venezuelan Andes) ====
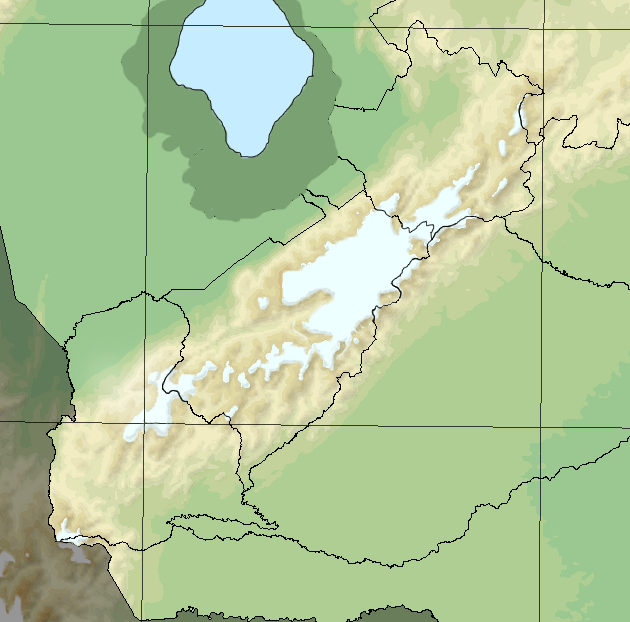
Extent of the glaciated area in Venezuelan Andes during the Mérida glaciation

The name Mérida glaciation is proposed to designate the alpine glaciation that affected the central Venezuelan Andes during the Late Pleistocene. Two main moraine levels have been recognized – one with an elevation of 2.6–2.7 km (1.6–1.7 mi), and another with an elevation of 3–3.5 km (1.9–2.2 mi). The snow line during the last glacial advance was lowered approximately 1.2 km (0.75 mi) below the present snow line, which is 3.7 km (2.3 mi). The glaciated area in the Cordillera de Mérida was about 600 km^{2} (230 sq mi); this included these high areas, from southwest to northeast: Páramo de Tamá, Páramo Batallón, Páramo Los Conejos, Páramo Piedras Blancas, and Teta de Niquitao.

Around 200 km^{2} (77 sq mi) of the total glaciated area was in the Sierra Nevada de Mérida and Sierra de Santo Domingo, and of that amount, the largest concentration, 50 km^{2} (19 sq mi), was in the areas of Pico Bolívar, Pico Humboldt 4.942 km (3.071 mi), and Pico Bonpland 4.983 km (3.096 mi). Radiocarbon dating indicates that the moraines are older than 10,000 years ago, and probably older than 13,000 years ago. The lower moraine level probably corresponds to the main Wisconsin glacial advance. The upper level probably represents the last glacial advance (Late Wisconsin).

==== Llanquihue glaciation (Southern Andes) ====
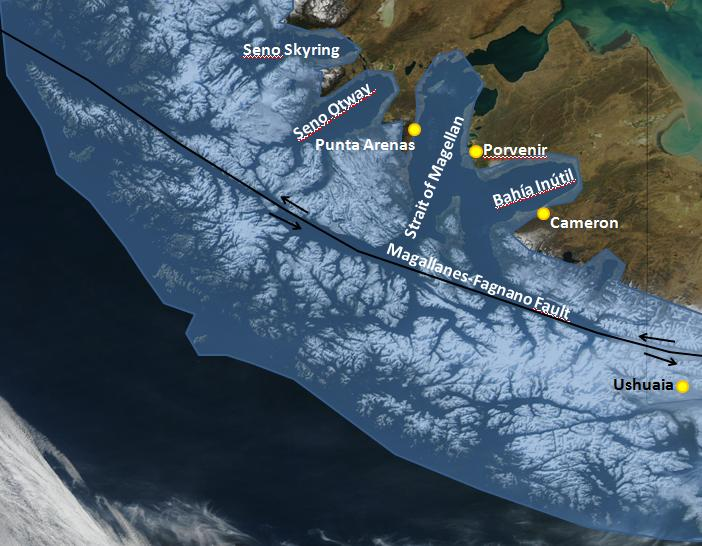
Extent of the Patagonian ice sheet in the Strait of Magellan area during the LGP: Selected modern settlements are shown with yellow dots

Modelled maximum extent of the Antarctic ice sheet, 21,000 years ago

The Llanquihue glaciation takes its name from Llanquihue Lake in southern Chile, which is a fan-shaped piedmont glacial lake. On the lake's western shores, large moraine systems occur, of which the innermost belong to the LGP. Llanquihue Lake's varves are a node point in southern Chile's varve geochronology. During the last glacial maximum, the Patagonian ice sheet extended over the Andes from about 35°S to Tierra del Fuego at 55°S. The western part appears to have been very active, with wet basal conditions, while the eastern part was cold-based.

Cryogenic features such as ice wedges, patterned ground, pingos, rock glaciers, palsas, soil cryoturbation, and solifluction deposits developed in unglaciated extra-Andean Patagonia during the last glaciation, but not all these reported features have been verified. The area west of Llanquihue Lake was ice-free during the last glacial maximum, and had sparsely distributed vegetation dominated by Nothofagus. Valdivian temperate rain forest was reduced to scattered remnants on the western side of the Andes.

== See also ==
Historical names of the "four major" glacials in four regions
Region	Glacial 1	Glacial 2	Glacial 3	Glacial 4
Alps	Günz	Mindel	Riss	Würm
North Europe	Eburonian	Elsterian	Saalian	Weichselian
British Isles	Beestonian	Anglian	Wolstonian	Devensian
Midwest U.S.	Nebraskan	Kansan	Illinoian	Wisconsinan

- Glacial history of Minnesota
- Glacial lake outburst flood
- Glacial period
- Penultimate Glacial Period
- Pleistocene, which includes:
- Pleistocene megafauna
- Plio-Pleistocene
- Late Pleistocene extinctions
- Quaternary glaciation
- Sea level rise
- Stone Age
- Timeline of glaciation
- Valparaiso Moraine
