= Tiglian =

Stage in the glacial history of Northern Europe

The Tiglian, also referred to as the Tegelen, is a temperate complex stage in the glacial history of Northern Europe. It is preceded by the Praetiglian (stage). The stage was introduced by Zagwijn in 1957 based on geological formations in Tegelen in southern Netherlands. Originally, it was thought to be part of a sequence of glacials and interglacials, namely Praetiglian (cold), Tiglian (warm), Eburonian (cold), Waalian (warm), Menapian (cold), and Bavelian (warm).

The Praetiglian and Tiglian are today regarded as corresponding to the Biber stage in the glacial history of the Alps and to the Gelasian (2.6-1.8 million years ago) in the global division of the Quaternary period. Deep sea core samples have identified approximately 40 marine isotope stages (MIS 103 – MIS 64) during the Gelasian. Thus, there have probably been about 20 glacial cycles of varying intensity during Praetiglian and Tiglian. The dominant trigger is believed to be the 41 000 year Milankovitch cycles of axial tilt.

The Gelasian of Northern Europe has subsequently been subdivided as follows:

- Praetiglian (oldest)
- Tiglian A
- Tiglian B
- Tiglian C1
- Tiglian C2
- Tiglian C3
- Tiglian C4(a-c)
- Tiglian C5
- Tiglian C6 (youngest)

== See also ==
- Timeline of glaciation
