= Hoxnian Stage =

Interglacial period of history of the British Isles during the middle Pleistocene

Hoxnian
- 0.424 – 0.374 Ma

Usage information
- Celestial body: Earth
- Regional usage: Regional
- Used by: United Kingdom

Definition
- Chronological unit: Age
- Stratigraphic unit: Stage

The Hoxnian Stage was a middle Pleistocene stage of the geological history of the British Isles. It was an interglacial which preceded the Wolstonian Stage and followed the Anglian Stage. It is equivalent to Marine Isotope Stage 11 (MIS 11). Marine Isotope Stage 11 started 424,000 years ago and ended 374,000 years ago. The Hoxnian is divided into sub-stages Ho I to Ho IV. It is equivalent to the Holstein interglacial in Central Europe.

Archaeologically, the beginning of the period consists of an earlier Clactonian industry, characterised by a lack of hand axes, which was then replaced about 415,000 years ago with an Acheulean industry using hand axes. The period is also known from the remains of "Swanscombe Man", the partial skull of an early Neanderthal.

== History ==
The Hoxnian Stage is named after Hoxne in the English county of Suffolk where some of the deposits created were first found. It was identified and dated with palynology or pollen evidence in the biostratigraphy and later updated with aminostratigraphic techniques. Based on stratigraphic information the Hoxnian happened after the Anglian glacial as Anglian soil is frequently found underneath Hoxnian deposits.

=== Similarly timed interglacials ===
The Hoxnian stage has often been correlated to the Holstein Interglacial of northern Continental Europe and the Mindel-Riss Interglacial of the Alps. However, there was historically ambiguity regarding the correlation of these two interglacials to either MIS 11 or MIS 9, which is related to the MIS 12 / MIS 10 ambiguity described in more detail in the article 'Elster glaciation'. Recent research has strongly supported both the Hoxnian and Holsteinian occurring during Marine Isotope Stage 11, c. 425-375,000 years ago.

The Hoxnian stage has also been equated to the Yarmouthian (Yarmouth) Stage in North America. However, the Yarmouthian Stage, along with the Kansan, Nebraskan, and Aftonian stages, have been abandoned by North American Quaternary geologists and merged into the Pre-Illinoian Stage. At this time, the Hoxnian and Holstein stages are correlated with a brief part of the Pre-Illinoian Stage lying between the Pre-Illinoian A and Pre-Illinoian B glaciations of North America.

=== Humans ===
Archaeologically, the beginning of the period consists of an earlier Clactonian industry, characterised by a lack of hand axes, which was then replaced about 415,000 years ago with an Acheulean industry using hand axes. During the Hoxnian human activity was constrained by the dense forests so humans travelled along rivers and created settlements in valleys. The Beeches Pit site revealed humans possibly selected sites rich with flint for toolmaking. The oldest clear evidence of deliberate firemaking dates to around 400,000 years ago at the Hoxnian-aged Barnfield site in England, where pyrite appears to have been struck against flint to create fire. At the Hoxian site of Ebbsfleet in Kent, remains of a straight-tusked elephant (dubbed the "Ebbsfleet elephant") have been found with Clactonian stone tools that are thought to have been used to butcher it. Multiple distinct cultural groups appear to have existed contemporaneously in different parts of Britain during the handaxe-producing part of the Hoxnian, as evidenced by distinct regional handaxe shape traditions in the Thames Basin and East Anglia, which also varied between the early and late parts of the period. Near Swanscombe in Kent, "Swanscombe Man", the partial skull of an early Neanderthal, has been found.

== Environment ==
The Hoxnian is an interglacial phase, meaning a warm period in between glacial periods. Interglacial phases are heavily vegetated with woodlands interspersed with open areas. Site deposits are often found over Anglian soil which dates to MIS 12. Most sites have been found in valleys with signs of river deposits. During the interglacial the valleys would have been surrounded by dense forests.

=== Fauna ===
Animals found in Britain during the Hoxnian include the straight-tusked elephant (Palaeoloxodon antiquus), Irish elk (Megaloceros giganteus), the extinct fallow deer species Dama clactoniana, red deer (Cervus elaphus), roe deer (Capreolus capreolus) aurochs (Bos primigenius), Merck's rhinoceros (Stephanorhinus kirchbergensis), the narrow-nosed rhinoceros (Stephanorhinus hemitoechus), Barbary macaque (Macaca sylvanus), wild boar (Sus scrofa), Eurasian beaver (Castor fiber), European rabbit (Oryctolagus cuniculus), wild horse (Equus ferus), European wild ass (Equus hydruntinus), cave bear (Ursus spelaea), the grey wolf ancestor Canis mosbachensis, the large lion Panthera fossilis, and the European jaguar (Panthera gombaszogensis).

=== Hoxnian sites ===
Beeches Pit, West Stow, Suffolk is a site dated to MIS 11 and under 40 km from other sites for the Lower Paleolithic and Middle Paleolithic. Beeches Pit is considered a site of special interest because not only were shells and plant remains found but animal bones that were burnt. The sites around Hitchin, Hertfordshire are associated with lakes caused by the melting of glaciers that settled in holes. When archaeologists dug up the sites they found dense soil full of gravel. The gravel is hypothesized to come from the creation of hand axes. At Marks Tey, Essex the lake soil was rich with pollen spanning all of the Hoxnian and remnants of gravel and artefacts.

== See also ==
- Ice age
- Glacial period
- Last glacial period
- Timeline of glaciation
