= Cromerian Stage =

The Cromerian Stage or Cromerian Complex, also called the Cromerian (German: Cromerium), is a stage in the Pleistocene glacial history of north-western Europe, mostly occurring more than half a million years ago. It is named after the East Anglian town of Cromer in Great Britain where interglacial deposits that accumulated during part of this stage were first discovered. The stratotype for this interglacial is the Cromer Forest Bed situated at the bottom of the coastal cliff near West Runton. The Cromerian stage preceded the Anglian and Elsterian glacials and show an absence of glacial deposits in western Europe, which led to the historical terms Cromerian interglacial and the Cromerian warm period (German: Kromer-Warmzeit). It is now known that the Cromerian consisted of multiple glacial and interglacial periods.

== Chronology ==
The core of the Cromerian is the first half of the Middle Pleistocene stage (Ionian) approximately 800-500 ka ago, just before the Anglian glaciation. In terms of Marine isotope stages (MIS) this corresponds to MIS 19 to MIS 13. Some authors instead put the start at MIS 22, corresponding to a start 900 ka ago, which includes the last 100 ka of the Calabrian stage, after the Beestonian Stage. Some sources today correlate the Elster glaciation to MIS 10 instead of MIS 12, while keeping the Cromerian running up to the start of the Elsterian. The result is an end to the Cromerian stage in continental Europe at the end of MIS 11 (400 ka ago), and that the continental Cromerian continues beyond its end in Britain and Ireland and runs in parallel to the Anglian and Hoxnian Stages (MIS 12-11).

In the Alpine region the corresponding stage is called Günz.

The Cromerian had been equated to the Aftonian in North America. However, the Aftonian, along with the Yarmouthian (Yarmouth), Kansan, and Nebraskan, have been abandoned by North American Quaternary geologists and merged into the Pre-Illinoian. At this time, the Cromerian is correlated with the period of time, which includes the Pre-Illinoian C, Pre-Illinoian D, and Pre-Illinoian E glaciations of North America.

Proposals for structuring the Cromerian complex have become quite confusing. Great potential for a full breakdown has been provided by the extensive, continental series at Gorleben.

== Glacial cycles ==
Based on a lack of glacial evidence in Western Europe for the Middle Pleistocene (Ionian) before the Anglian glaciation, the Cromerian was originally thought to be a period without major glaciations. However, there is evidence for ice-rafting of material across the North Sea from this period. Investigations in the 1950s of oxygene isotopes in deep sea core samples revealed five glacial cycles during MIS 22 - MIS 13. The Mid-Pleistocene Transition to the 100,000 year glacial cycle became established during the Cromerian. Four of the glaciations (MIS 22, MIS 20, MIS 18, MIS 14) were moderate, probably involving low-land glaciation in Scandinavia, but not spreading to England and northern Germany. One of the glaciations, Marine Isotope Stage 16 (MIS 16), is globally as strong as the most recent glaciations, MIS 6 (main Saale) and MIS 2 (Weichsel/Devensian). There is plenty of evidence in Russia for a major glaciation during this stage, which is called the Don Glaciation and believed to correspond to MIS 16. It is not clear why western Europe seems so unaffected by this major glacial.

== Fossils ==
In 1990 the West Runton Mammoth skeleton was found, the best example of the species Mammuthus trogontherii to be unearthed so far.

A significant fossil site, with animal remains dating about 600,000 years ago, is the Mosbach Sands in Germany, named after an abandoned village near Wiesbaden, Germany.

== See also ==
- Timeline of glaciation
- Quaternary
- Cromer Forest Bed

== Sources ==
- www.Stratigraphy.org
- www.zum.de
