= Pre-Illinoian =

Early and middle Pleistocene glacial and interglacial periods in North America

- ~2.5 – 0.2 Ma

Usage information
- Celestial body: Earth
- Regional usage: Regional
- Time scale(s) used: North American

Definition
- Chronological unit: Age
- Stratigraphic unit: Stage

The term Pre-Illinoian Stage is used by Quaternary geologists for the early and middle Pleistocene glacial and interglacial periods of geologic time in North America from ~2.5–0.2 Ma (million years ago).

== North America ==
As the oldest stage in the North American regional subdivision of the Quaternary, the Pre-Illinoian precedes the Illinoian Stage. Researchers have identified 11 distinct glacial stages during the Pre-Illinoian Stage.

The Pleistocene prior to the Illinoian stage had previously been subdivided into the Nebraskan, Aftonian, Kansan, and Yarmouthian stages (ages). However, detailed studies of these stages revealed that the assumptions and criteria on which they were defined proved to be wrong to such a point that these stages became meaningless in terms of the actual glacial–interglacial record.

For example, instead of two glaciations having occurred prior to the Illinoian Stage, researchers found that 11 distinct glaciations had occurred. In addition, what was presumed to have been a single volcanic ash bed, which was used to correlate and differentiate between Kansan and Nebraskan glacial deposits, was found to be three volcanic ash beds of greatly differing ages. Similarly, paleosols used in the definition of the stages were found to have been greatly miscorrelated, as they consisted of paleosols of greatly differing ages. Because of these and other major problems, the concepts on which the Nebraskan, Aftonian, Kansan, and Yarmouthian (Yarmouth) stages are defined were discredited. North American geologists discarded these stages as unusable and merged them into the Pre-Illinoian Stage.

== Great Britain ==
The Pre-Illinoian stage is contemporary with the Bramertonian, Pre-Pastonian, Pastonian, Beestonian, Cromerian, Anglian, Hoxnian, and lowermost Wolstonian stages of the British Isles combined. The end of the Pre-Illinoian stage has been correlated to the end of Marine Isotope Stage 9 at 300,000 BP. More recent geologic mapping, coring, and optically stimulated luminescence (OSL) dating of Illinoian glacial tills (Glasford Formation) and outwash (Pearl Formation) of the Illinoian Glacial Lobe in North-central Illinois demonstrates that the start of the Illinoian stage and end of the Pre-Illinoian stage correlates with the beginning of Marine Isotope Stage 6 at 191,000 BP.

== See also ==
- Ice age
- Glacial period
- Last glacial period
- Timeline of glaciation
