= Sangamonian =

Last interglacial stage in the North American regional subdivision of the Quaternary

The Sangamonian Stage (or Sangamon interglacial) is the term used in North America to designate the Last Interglacial (130,000-115,000 years ago) and depending on definition, part of the early Last Glacial Period, corresponding to Marine Isotope Stage 5 (~130-80,000 years ago). While often historically considered equivalent in scope to MIS 5, it is now often used in a more narrow sense to refer to the Last Interglacial only (corresponding to MIS 5e and the European Eemian). It preceded the Wisconsinan (Wisconsin) Stage and followed the Illinoian Stage in North America.

== Definition ==
The Sangamonian Stage, originally the Sangamon interglacial stage, is defined on the basis of the Sangamon Soil, a paleosol, which is developed in contemporaneous colluvium and older glacial tills and loesses and overlain by Wisconsinan loesses or tills. Although originally described from water wells in northwestern Sangamon County, Illinois, the current type sections for the Sangamon Stage are the Rochester section in eastern Sangamon County and the Chapman section in Morgan County, Illinois. In the Rochester Section, the Sangamon Soil is developed in Sangamonian colluvial sediments, called “accretion gley”, that accumulated contemporaneously with the development of the Sangamon Soil. In the Rochester section, the Sangamon Soil is developed directly in Illinoian glacial till and overlain by Roxana Silt, the oldest of the two regional Wisconsinan loesses.

== Correlations ==
In its typical and broadest usage, the Sangamonian Stage is equivalent to all of Marine isotope stage 5 between 75,000 and 125,000 BP. Although it includes the same time span, the Sangamonian Stage (sensu lato) is not temporally equivalent to the Eemian in Europe. In its much less common usage, the Sangamonian Stage (sensu stricto) is equivalent to Marine Isotope Substage 5e and the Eemian. In case of this usage, Marine Isotope Substages 5a, 5b, 5c, and 5d are collectively referred to as the Eowisconsinan Stage. In its broadest sense (sensu lato), the Sangamonian Stage precedes the Wisconsinan (Wisconsin) Stage and follows the Illinoian Stage in North America.

Research concerning the age and degree of development of the Sangamon Soil demonstrates that it actively developed, at the least, over all of Marine Isotope Stage 5, which is a period of time from 125,000 to 75,000 BP. Unlike Europe, the development of ice sheets in Canada was limited during Marine Isotope Substages 5b, 5c, and 5b and either completely disappeared or were greatly reduced in size during Marine Isotope Substage 5a. Because of the continuous development of the Sangamonian Soil in the Midwest and the limited development of ice sheets in North America during this marine isotope stage, the Sangamonian Stage, unlike the Eemian in Europe, is regarded as encompassing all of Marine Isotope Stage 5.

== Dates ==
The start of the Sangamonian Stage is constrained by optically stimulated luminescence (OSL) dates obtained from fluvial deposits of the Pearl Formation and Illinoian glacial tills of the Glasford Formation, which fill an ancient and buried Mississippi River valley in north-central Illinois. The age of fluvial sediments overlying the youngest glacial till (Radnor Member) of the Glasford Formation yield optically stimulated luminescence (OSL) dates that averaged 131,000 BP. These OSL dates demonstrate that the Illinoian Stage ended and the Sangamonian Stage started about 125,000 BP. These dates refute older dates, i.e. between 220,000 and 450,000 BP, given by older publications for the start of the Sangamonian Stage.

== Events ==
The steppe bison (Bison priscus) migrated into the heartlands of North America from Alaska at the beginning of the Sangamonian, giving rise to the giant long-horned bison Bison latifrons (which is first known from the Snowmass site in Colorado, dating to around 120,000 years ago) and ultimately all North American bison species, and marking the beginning of the Rancholabrean faunal age in North America. Also in the Sangamonian the American lion (Panthera atrox) appeared and become widespread across North America, having descended from populations of the Eurasian cave lion (Panthera spelaea) that had migrated into Alaska during the preceding Illinoian.

== See also ==
- Ice age
- Timeline of glaciation
