= Illinoian (stage) =

Geological period in North America in the Quaternary

The Illinoian Stage is the name used by Quaternary geologists in North America to designate the Penultimate Glacial Period c.191,000 to c.130,000 years ago, during the late Middle Pleistocene (Chibanian), when sediments comprising the Illinoian Glacial Lobe were deposited. It precedes the Sangamonian Stage (corresponding to the global Last Interglacial) and follows the Pre-Illinoian Stage in North America. The Illinoian Stage is defined as the period of geologic time during which the glacial tills and outwash, which comprise the bulk of the Glasford Formation, accumulated to create the Illinoian Glacial Lobe.

== Definition ==
At its type exposure in Peoria County, Illinois, the Illinoian deposits consist of three till members of the Glasford Formation. They overlay Pre-Illinoian tills of the Banner Formation, in which the Yarmouth Soil (paleosol) has developed. In this exposure, the Illinoian Glasford Formation, in which the interglacial Sangamon Soil (palesosol) has developed, is overlain by early Wisconsinan stage loess, called the Roxana Silt. A paleosol, called the Pike Soil, separates two of the till members within the Glasford Formation.

=== Substages ===
The Illinoian Stage is further subdivided into:

- the Liman Substage,
- the Monican Substage, and
- the Jubileean Substage.

== Correlation ==
Since 1986, the Illinoian Stage has been interpreted as consisting of two glaciations, the early Illinoian (Marine Isotope Stage 8) and late Illinoian glaciations (Marine Isotope Stage 6) and the intervening interglacial period (Marine Isotope stage 7). In this interpretation, the Pike Soil is proposed to an interglacial (Marine Isotope Stage 7) paleosol. According to this interpretation, the Illinoian Stage started about 300,000 years ago and ended about 130,000 years ago.

However, later studies of the fluvial deposits of the Pearl Formation and Illinoian glacial tills of the Glasford Formation, which fill an ancient and buried Mississippi River valley in north-central Illinois, demonstrated that the Illinoian Stage in its type area consists of glaciations that occurred only during Marine Isotope Stage 6. The age of proglacial fluvial sediments underlying the oldest known glacial till (Kellerville Member) of the Glasford Formation yield optically stimulated luminescence (OSL) dates that averaged 160,000 BP. The oldest fluvial sediments, which overlay bedrock in the deepest part of the valley, were dated by OSL dating to around 190,000 BP. These OSL dates demonstrate that the Illinoian Stage is temporarily equivalent only to Marine Isotope Stage 6, which ended at 130,000 BP and started at 191,000 BP. If the Illinoian Stage is limited in duration to Marine Isotope Stage 6, the Yarmouth Soil (paleosol) spans a period of geologic time equivalent to Marine Isotope stages 7, 8, 9, 10, and 11.

The Illinoian Stage in North America is not exactly equivalent to the Wolstonian Stage of the British Isles. The Wolstonian stage is equivalent to Marine Isotope stages 6, 7, 8, 9, and 10. and, thus, started about 352,000 years ago and ended 130,000 years ago. As a result, the Illinoian Stage is only temporally equivalent to either middle and late Wolstonian stage or late Wolstonian stage in the British Isles. In North America, the term "Wolstonian stage" is not used by geomorphologists and Quaternary geologists to designate glacial deposits and paleosols lying between the Sangamon and Yarmouth soils (paleosols).

== Extent ==
During the Illinoian Stage, the Laurentide Ice Sheet covered about 85 percent of Illinois. At its maximum extent during this stage, this ice sheet reached its southernmost extent in North America near Carbondale, Illinois. At their maximum extent, the edge of Illinoian ice sheet(s) lay further south than the southernmost extent, i.e. Douglas County, Kansas, of any of the Pre-Illinoian ice sheets.

== See also ==
- Wolstonian Stage
- Bull Lake glaciation
- Ice age
- Glacial period
- Last glacial period
- Timeline of glaciation
