= Mindel glaciation =

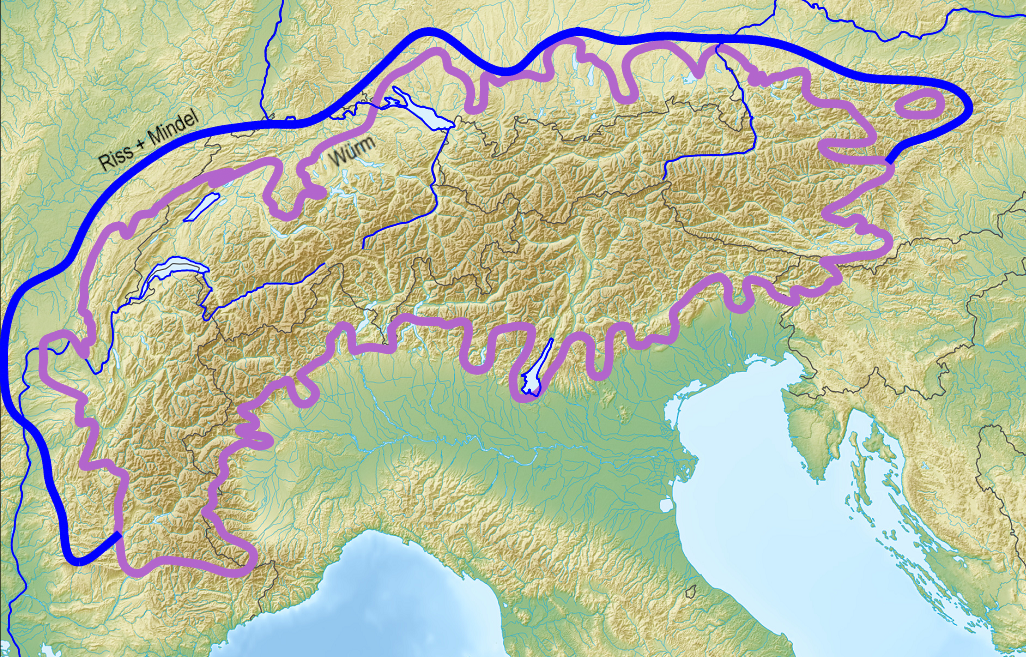
Extent of Alpine glaciation (blue: edge of the ice sheet in the Mindel and Riss glacial periods)

The Mindel glaciation (German: Mindel-Kaltzeit, also Mindel-Glazial, Mindel-Komplex or, colloquially, Mindel-Eiszeit) is the third youngest glacial stage in the Alps. Its name was coined by Albrecht Penck and Eduard Brückner, who named it after the Swabian river, the Mindel. The Mindel glacial occurred in the Middle Pleistocene; it was preceded by the Haslach-Mindel interglacial (often regarded as part of Günz) and succeeded by the Mindel-Riss interglacial (Holstein interglacial).

The Mindel glaciation is commonly correlated with the Elster glaciation of northern Europe. The more precise timing is controversial since Mindel is commonly correlated to two different marine isotope stages, MIS 12 (478–424 thousand years ago) and MIS 10 (374–337 thousand years ago). This ambiguity is much related to the correlation problem described in more detail in the article 'Elster glaciation'.

== See also ==
- Timeline of glaciation
- Glaciology

== Literature ==
- K.A. Habbe; D. Ellwanger; R. Becker-Haumann (2007), "Stratigraphische Begriffe für das Quartär des süddeutschen Alpenvorlandes", Eiszeitalter und Gegenwart Quaternary Science Journal (in German), 56 (1/2): 66–83, doi:10.3285/eg.56.1-2.03, hdl:11858/00-1735-0000-0001-B9FE-0, ISSN 0424-7116
- T. Litt; et al., "Das Quartär in der Stratigraphischen Tabelle von Deutschland 2002", Newsletters in Stratigraphie (in German), vol. 41, no. 1–3, Berlin, Stuttgart, pp. 385–399 explanation, table
- Albrecht Penck; Eduard Brückner (1901–1909), Die Alpen im Eiszeitalter (in German), Leipzig: C.H. Tauchnitz (3 volumes)
