= Holstein interglacial =

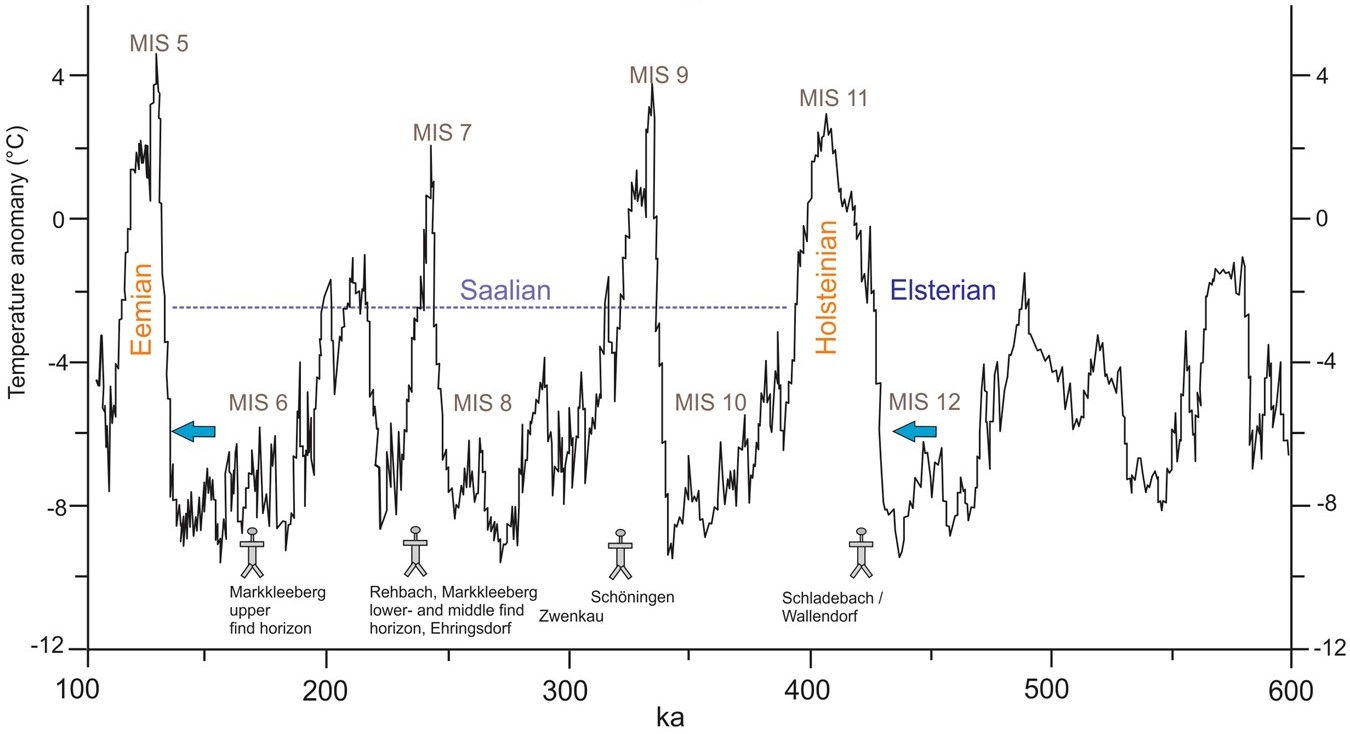
Graph of Pleistocene glacial cycles in Europe from 600-100,000 years ago, with the Holstein interglacial labelled

The Holstein or Holsteinian interglacial (German: Holstein-Warmzeit or Holstein-Interglazial), also called the Mindel-Riss interglacial (Mindel-Riß-Interglazial) in the Alpine region, is the third to last major interglacial in Europe before the Holocene, the present warm period. It followed directly after the Elster glaciation and came before the Saale glaciation, during the Middle Pleistocene. The more precise timing was historically controversial since Holstein was commonly correlated to two different marine isotope stages, MIS 11 (424–374 thousand years ago) and MIS 9 (337–300 thousand years ago). Recent scholarship has supported a MIS 11 date, spanning approximately 421-395,000 years ago.

== Definition ==
The Holstein interglacial is defined by marine sedimentation. On the stratigraphic record at the natural monument of de:Sievertsche Tongrube in Hamburg-Hummelsbüttel, its development is traced from the Elster ice age (Lauenburg clay) through the start of the warm period (freshwater depositions) to its flooding by the Holstein Sea (Cardien Sands).

== See also ==
- Timeline of glaciation

== Literature ==
- Hallik, R. (1960): Die Vegetationsentwicklung der Holstein-Warmzeit in Nordwestdeutschland und die Altersstellung der Kieselgurlager der südlichen Lüneburger Heide. – Zeitschrift der Deutschen Geologischen Gesellschaft 112: 326–333.
