= Riss glaciation =

Alpine glacial period in the Pleistocene epoch

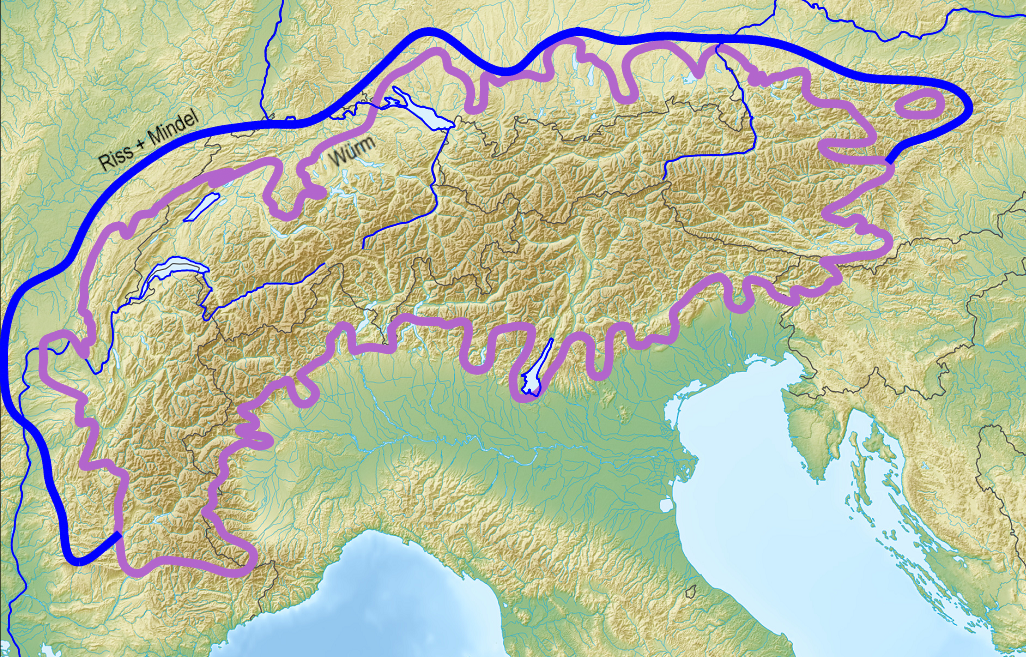
Extent of the Mindel and Riss glaciation (blue) in comparison with that of the Würm period

The Riss glaciation, Riss Glaciation, Riss ice age, Riss Ice Age, Riss glacial or Riss Glacial (German: Riß-Kaltzeit, Riß-Glazial, Riß-Komplex or (obsolete) Riß-Eiszeit) is the second youngest glaciation of the Pleistocene epoch in the traditional, quadripartite glacial classification of the Alps. The literature variously dates it to between about 300,000 to 130,000 years ago and 347,000 to 128,000 years ago. It coincides with the Saale glaciation of North Germany. The name goes back to Albrecht Penck and Eduard Brückner who named this cold period after the river Riss in Upper Swabia in their three-volume work Die Alpen im Eiszeitalter ("The Alps in the Ice Age") published between 1901 and 1909.

== Boundaries and division ==
The Riss glaciation was defined by Penck and Brückner as the Lower (Niedere) or Younger Old Moraines and Old Terminal Moraines High Terraces (Jüngere Altmoränen und Alt-Endmoränen-Hochterrassen). The type locality lies near Biberach an der Riß where the end of the northeastern Rhine Glacier stood. Results gained from over a century of research show that in almost all glacial periods, several ice advances took place. Today it is thought that there were, in all, at least eight to fifteen ice advances. In the Riss stage, too, there were several advances of the ice sheet, so that it can be divided into interstadials (ice retreats) and stadials (ice advances), and at least one hitherto unnamed warm period.

The present-day division differs from the original Penck classification. The beginning of the Riss ice age, according to the 2002 Stratigraphic Table of Germany, was the end of the Holstein interglacial (known as the Mindel-Riss interglacial in the Alpine Foreland and corresponding to the Samerbe, Thalgut, Praclaux and La Côte). Its end is the start of the Eem interglacial (Riss-Würm interglacial). It is thus roughly contemporaneous with the Saale glaciation of the North German glacial sequence. The Riss is paralleled by MIS 6, 8 and 10, which would therefore place it about 350,000 and 120,000 years ago. Excluded from the Riss glaciation is the so-called Old Riss (Ältere Riß), the time of the greatest ice advance in the Alpine region: today it is referred to as the Haslach-Mindel complex (in Bavaria and Austria), Hoßkirch complex (in Baden-Württemberg) or Great Glaciation in Switzerland.

The classification of ice ages in Switzerland varies from that used in the Bavarian and Austrian Alpine Foreland. The glaciation complex between the end of the Holstein and the beginning of the Eem interglacials is referred to as the Penultimate Ice Age and the Great Glaciation. It is divided into two additional interstadials, the so-called Double Holstein Event of Meikirch (doppelte Holstein-Vorkommen von Meikirch), which is not identical, however, with the Holstein interglacial.

During the period of maximum glaciation, ancient man (Homo heidelbergensis – later the Neanderthals) retreated behind the permafrost boundary and, in the warmer periods, spread beyond it to the north and northeast. Not until the Weichsel-Würm ice age did modern Cro-Magnon man settle these regions, in about 40,000 BC.

== Sequence and extent of the Riss glaciation ==
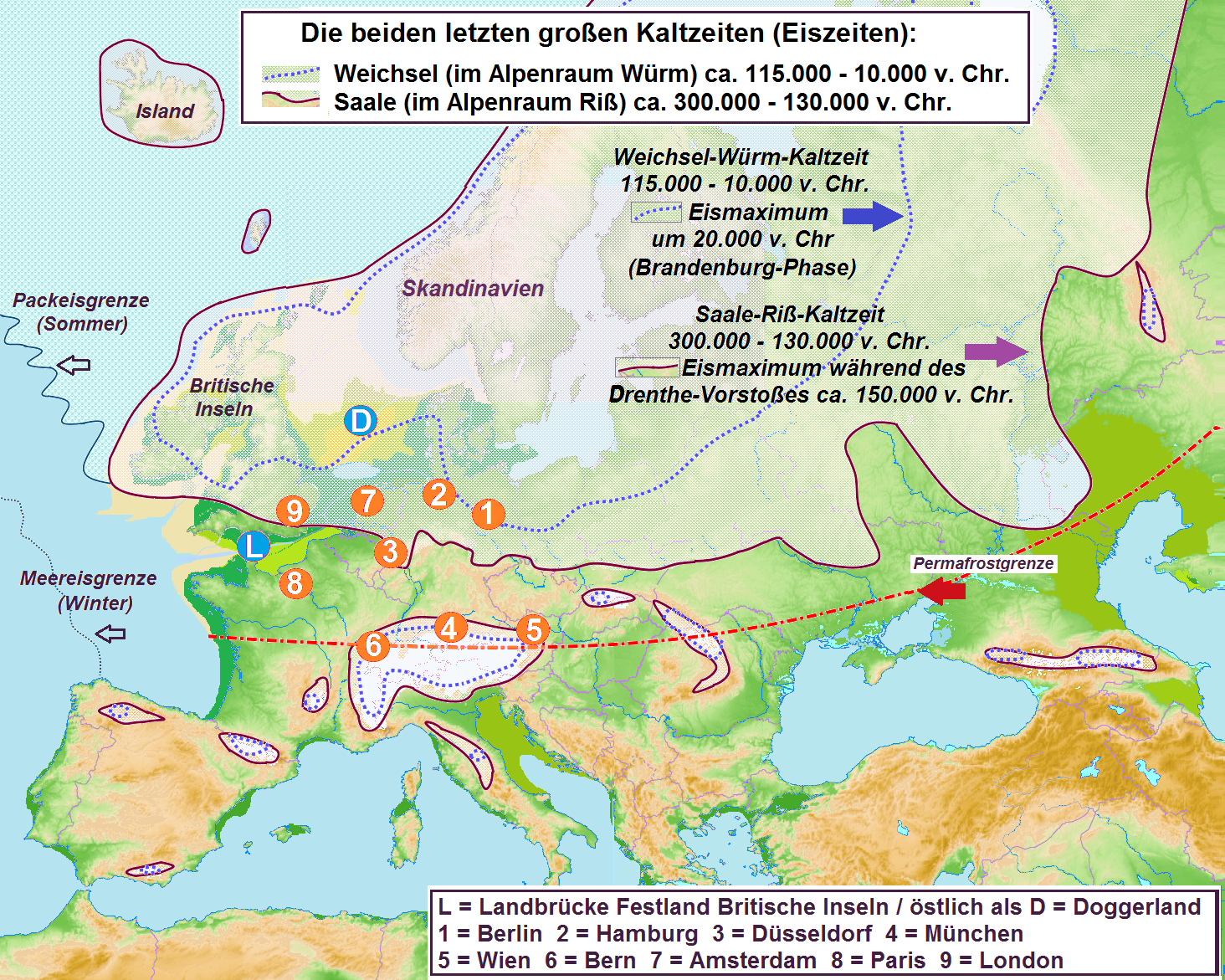
Alpine Riss glaciation (in the north: the Saale) compared with the later Würm glaciation (in the north: the Weichselian)

At the beginning of the Riss ice age almost all of today's Alpine river valleys were created. The glaciation of the Alps, even before the Holstein interglacial and towards the end of the major glaciations, resulted in glaciers advancing in several phases far into the Alpine Foreland, further than all other known ice sheet advances, and the main glaciers had established themselves along today's river valleys. During the Riss, glaciers advanced into the Bavarian and Austrian Alpine Foreland probably four times. The first two advances have not been confirmed with certainty because they are overlaid by the two stadials at the end of the Riss glaciation that extended well to the north.

The ice sheet advances of the cold period were mostly well beyond the glacial lake of the previous ice sheet. In most areas, the Riss terminal moraines have formed as low embankments, for example in the area of the Inn Glacier, the Isar-Loisach Glacier, the Iller Glacier, and in the area of the western Rhine Glacier. In the type region in Biberach there is a clear, but rather atypical double moraine ridge, also atypical is the double terrace here, which is probably due to heavy erosion as the meltwater runoff moved from the Wellheim Dry Valley and Altmühl valley into the present day Danube valley, a process that took place during the Riss glaciation. The double ridge of the type region (Doppelwallriß, with an outer and inner ridge) is a result of two superimposed sequences of glacial deposits which indicates that the Riss was subdivided into at least two stadials.

In the west the Rhône Glacier covered large parts of the Swiss Plateau and reached as far north as the northern Folded Jura and as far south as Lyon. To the northeast, it transitioned without any sharp demarcation into the Linth Glacier and Reuss - Aare Glacier; only the Napf area remaining ice-free. Further to the northeast, the Reuss-Aare Glacier combined with the Rhine glacier. This extended north beyond the present-day River Danube to the area of the Swabian Jura. In Bavaria, the Riss moraines form a little subdivided countryside without bogs and lakes, where they are not covered by the younger deposits of the Würm glaciation. The gravels associated with the Riss moraines form the present high terraces of the Danube tributaries.

During the Riss, the Salzach and Dachstein glaciers were somewhat smaller than during the Günz and Mindel glaciations, the latter extending in each case to the Hausruck and Kobernauß Forest ridge (subalpine molasse).

== Literature ==
- K.A. Habbe; D. Ellwanger; R. Becker-Haumann (2007), "Stratigraphische Begriffe für das Quartär des süddeutschen Alpenvorlandes", Eiszeitalter und Gegenwart Quaternary Science Journal (in German), 56 (1/2): 66–83, doi:10.3285/eg.56.1-2.03, hdl:11858/00-1735-0000-0001-B9FE-0, ISSN 0424-7116
- T. Litt; et al. (2005), "Das Quartär in der Stratigraphischen Tabelle von Deutschland 2002", Newsletters in Stratigraphie (in German), vol. 41, no. 1–3, Berlin, Stuttgart, pp. 385–399, doi:10.1127/0078-0421/2005/0041-0385. "Text" (PDF). Archived from the original (PDF) on 2010-02-16. "Table" (PDF). Archived from the original (PDF) on 2010-02-16.
- Albrecht Penck; Eduard Brückner (1901–1909), Die Alpen im Eiszeitalter (in German), Leipzig: C.H. Tauchnitz (3 volumes)
