= Gunz (geology) =

Timespan in the glacial history of the Alps

Gunz, Günz or Gunz Complex is a timespan in the glacial history of the Alps. It started approximately one million years ago and ended about 370 000 years ago. Some sources put the end at 480 000 years ago. Deep sea core samples have identified approximately 5 glacial cycles of varying intensity during Gunz.

== History of the term ==
The name Gunz glaciation, Gunzian glaciation or Günz glacial stage (German: Günz-Kaltzeit, also Günz-Glazial, Günz-Komplex and Günz-Eiszeit) goes back to Albrecht Penck and Eduard Brückner, who named this ice age after the River Günz in their multi-volume work, Die Alpen im Eiszeitalter ("The Alps in the Ice Age Period") which was published between 1901 and 1909. Its type region is the Iller-Lech Plateau. It is the oldest glaciation of the Pleistocene in the traditional, quadripartite glacial classification of the Alps. The Günz was thought to follow the Danube-Günz interglacial and was ended by the Günz-Haslach interglacial.

The 2016 version of the detailed stratigraphic table by the German Stratigraphic Commission puts the start of Gunz in the late Calabrian (approximately one million years ago, earlier than MIS 19) and shows a continuity of glacial cycles with the following Mindel stage, with the border arbitrarily put at the start of MIS 10 (approximately 374 000 years ago). Gunz corresponds roughly to the Cromerian stage in the glacial history of Northern Europe.

== Glacial cycles ==
Deep sea core samples have identified approximately 10 marine isotope stages (at least MIS 21 to MIS 11) during Gunz. Thus, there have probably been about 5 glacial cycles of varying intensity during Gunz. During Gunz the 41 000 year glacial cycle of previous stages (Biber and Danube) had been replaced by a dominance of a 100,000-year cycle (Mid-Pleistocene Transition). The most intense glacials of Gunz (MIS 16 and MIS 12) reached similar extents to those of the more recent Riss and Wurm glacials. These have not been easy to identify in the geological record of the Alps, but MIS 16 has been identified with the Don Glaciation of Eastern Europe. The strong glacial MIS 12 has been problematic, and has sometimes been identified with the Mindel glaciation, which would imply an end to Gunz already after MIS 13 (480 000 years ago).

== See also ==
- Timeline of glaciation

== Literature ==
- T. Litt; et al., "Das Quartär in der Stratigraphischen Tabelle von Deutschland 2002" (PDF), Newsletters in Stratigraphie (in German), vol. 41, no. 1–3, Berlin, Stuttgart, pp. 385–399, archived from the original (PDF) on 2015-09-23
- Albrecht Penck; Eduard Brückner (1901–1909), Die Alpen im Eiszeitalter (in German), Leipzig: C.H. Tauchnitz (3 volumes)
