= Boxgrove Palaeolithic site =

Archaeological site in West Sussex, England

Eartham Pit, Boxgrove
- Site of Special Scientific Interest
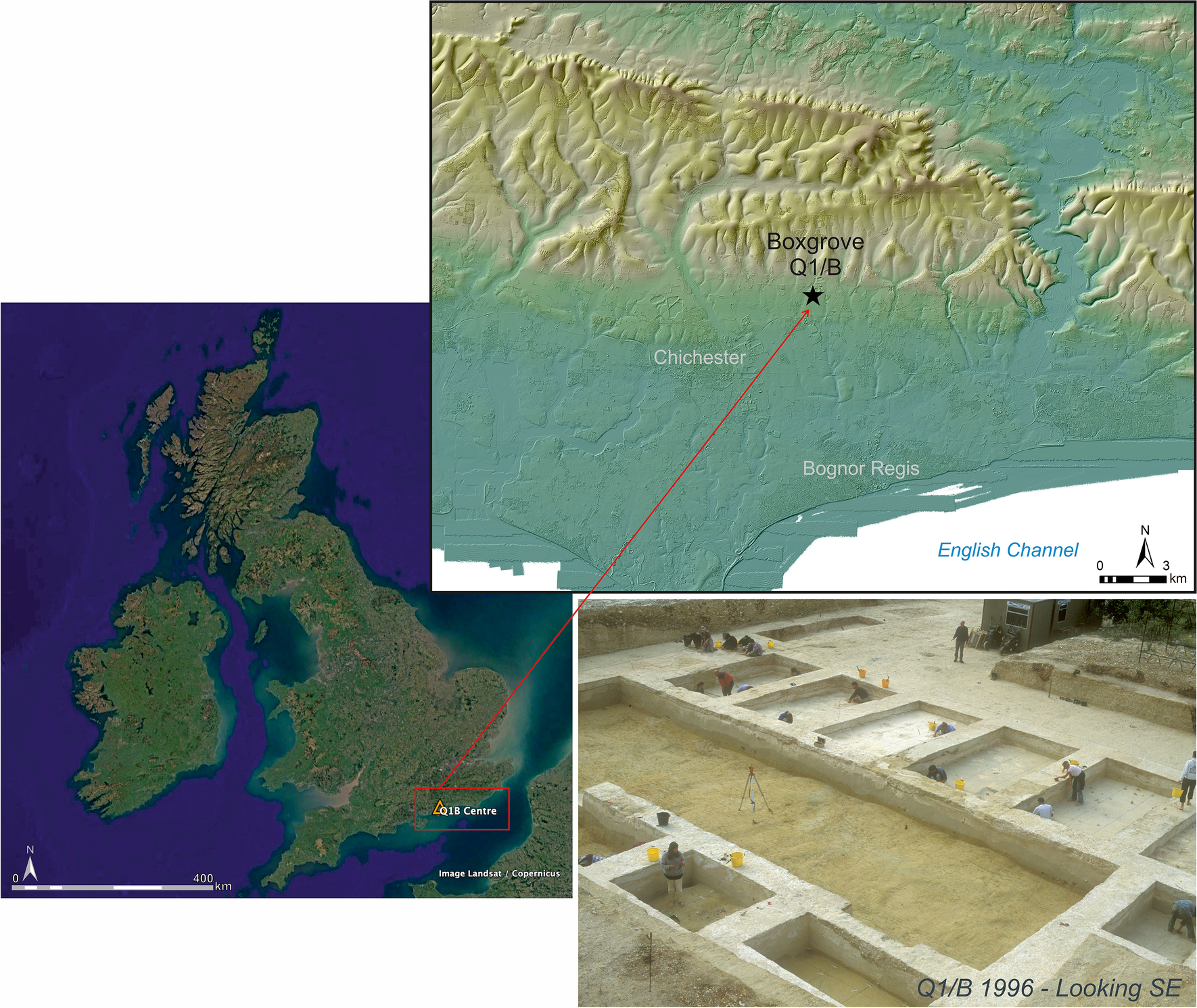
- Location of Boxgrove, with the South Downs shown in relief in Lidar map (top right) in yellow, with excavation trenches bottom right
- Location of Eartham Pit, Boxgrove.
- Area of search: West Sussex
- Grid reference: SU 923 086
- Coordinates: 50.870°N 0.690°W
- Interest: Geological, Archaeological
- Area: 9.8 hectares (24 acres)
- Notification date: 1997

The Boxgrove Palaeolithic site is a complex of internationally important Lower Palaeolithic archaeological sites in the former Eartham Quarry, north-east of Boxgrove in West Sussex, dating to around 480,000 years ago during the Middle Pleistocene. The oldest human remains in Britain, designated "Boxgrove Man", have been recovered from the site, possibly attributable to Homo heidelbergensis. Boxgrove is also one of the oldest sites in Europe with direct evidence of hunting and butchering by early humans. Only part of the site is protected through designation, one area being a 9.8-hectare (24-acre) geological Site of Special Scientific Interest, as well as a Geological Conservation Review site.

Other key Lower Paleolithic sites in the UK include the Happisburgh footprints (the oldest evidence of humans in Britain), Kents Cavern, and Swanscombe.

The site is close to a fossil shoreline and has a interglacial, temperate climate fauna in deposited in sediments representing initially coastal marine, transitioning upwards into coastal mudflat and later grassland and woodland environments. The site was discovered by Andrew Woodcock and Roy Shephard-Thorn in 1974. They recorded the geological sequence, in-situ artefacts and fossil mammal remains. Parts of the site complex were later excavated between 1982 and 1996 by a team led by Mark Roberts of the Institute of Archaeology, University College London. The site is situated in an area that features a buried chalk cliff that overlooked a flat beach (which contained a waterhole) stretching approximately half a mile (1 km) south to the sea.

== Geological context ==
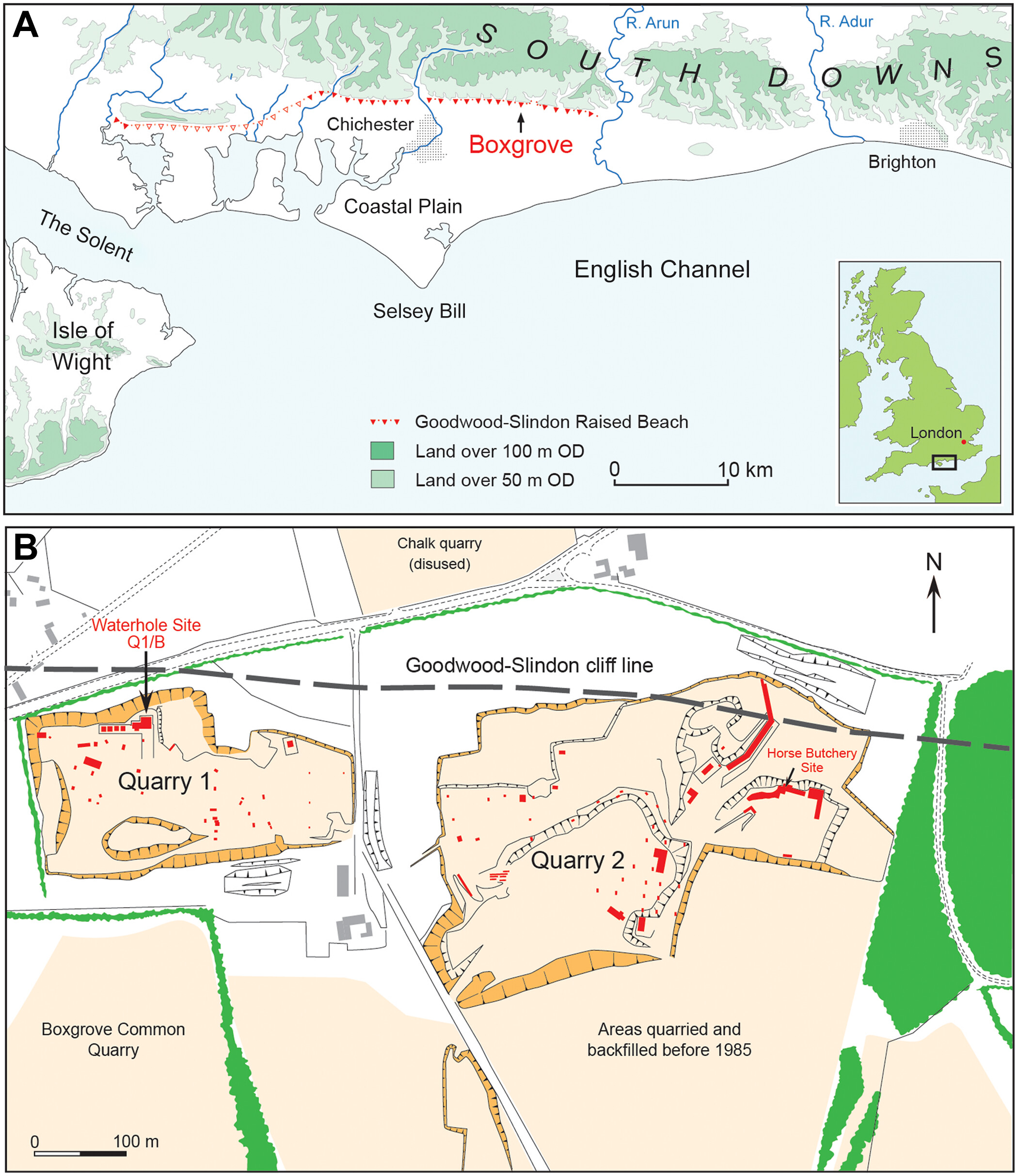
Map of the Boxgrove quarry and its geographic context

The site is located in the West Sussex coastal plain, immediately to the south of the South Downs, a chalk ridge that extends across much of Southeast England.^{xix} The Boxgrove site was deposited on top of a wave-cut platform of chalk, when the site was located on the coast;^{xix} it is now part of a raised beach. At the time, Boxgrove was on the north shore of an enclosed bay with a narrow entrance to the English Channel to the south, and Britain was a peninsula of mainland Europe, with southeast England being connected to northern France and the Netherlands by a land bridge, which separated the English Channel and North Sea.

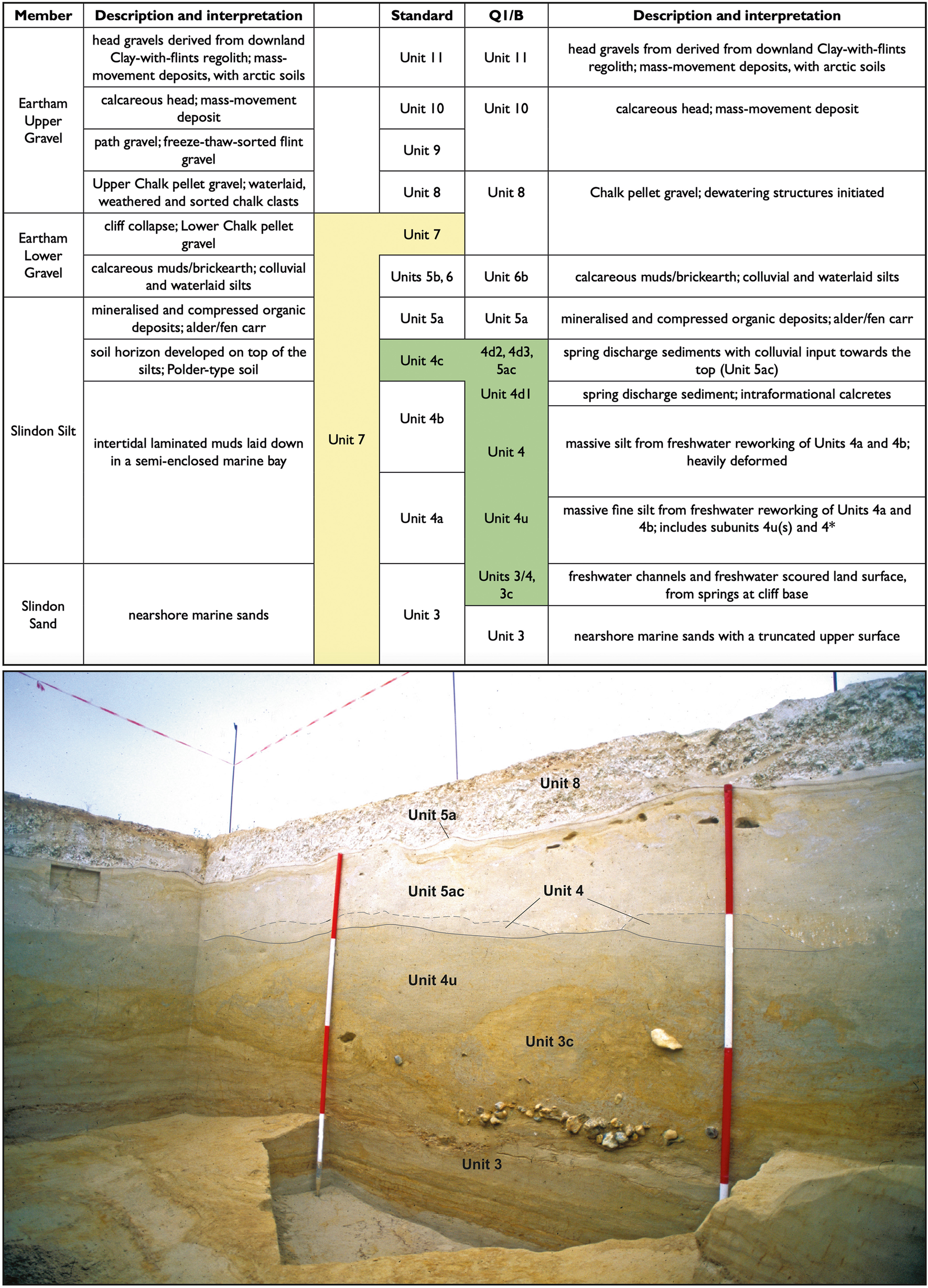
Stratigraphy of the Boxgrove site (above), and photograph of the layers as exhibited at the Q1/B "watering hole" site (below)

The Boxgrove deposits make up part of the Slindon Formation, and were just south of a (now completely buried) chalk cliff face, estimated to have reached a height of 60 metres (200 ft) formed by marine erosion of the chalk. The site is now some 10 kilometres (6.2 mi) inland and 35–43.5 metres (115–143 ft) above present sea level, because of later tectonic uplift of the area after the deposition of the Boxgrove site. The earliest member of the Slindon Formation, the Slindon Sand member, comprising layers of gravel and sand, records near-shore marine conditions at the Boxgrove site. Above the Slindon Sand Member is the Slindon Silt Member, the main unit of archaeological and paleontological interest at site, which records the transition of the site from being underwater to emergent land, and consists of silt and an upper thin paleosol (preserved soil) layer, deposited in a temperate climate, which records a transition from mudflats (unit 4b) in the lower part of the member, up to a terrestrial grassland along with woodland and water pools (units 4c, 4d and 4u), subsequently transitioning upwards into a horizon of mineralized organics representing fen or carr (unit 5a). Above this lies clay and gravel deposits of the Eartham Lower Gravel Member, comprising cliff scree. This is covered by periglacial gravel deposits of the Eartham Upper Gravel Member (with both members being part of the Eartham Formation) deposited under cold arctic conditions.^{21-149}

The Slindon Formation is thought to have been deposited during an episode of relatively high sea level. The Slindon Silt Member is dated to the interglacial period at the end of Marine Isotope Stage 13, around 480,000 years ago, based on biostratigraphic analysis of the species of mammal found at the site, with the Eartham Formation representing deposits of the subsequent Anglian glaciation during Marine Isotope Stage (MIS) 12. The fossiliferous terrestrial paleosol horizon of the Slindon Silt Member present at Boxgrove, though only relatively narrow at 30–250 metres (98–820 ft) wide, extends some distance from the site following an east-west axis along the base of the buried chalk cliff face, spanning 16 kilometres (9.9 mi) between Slindon Park and Adsdean Farm. Another site containing this horizon, Valdoe Quarry, 4.8 kilometres (3.0 mi) to the west of Boxgrove, has also yielded animal fossils and stone tools.

== Contents ==
The site is considered important for the degree of preservation of ancient land surfaces, the extent of the palaeolandscape beyond the quarries (over 26 km wide), its quantity of well-preserved animal bones, its flint artifacts, and its hominin fossils that are among some of the most ancient found yet in Europe. Some fossils of animals are the oldest known specimens of their species. The combination of bones, stone artifacts, and the geology of the landscape gives a detailed look into the coastal plain as it existed half a million years ago.

=== Fauna ===
Fauna of the Boxgrove site^{158-159}
Taxon	Notes	Images
Smooth newt (Triturus vulgaris)	Present in modern Britain	
Northern crested newt (Triturus cristatus)	Present in modern Britain	
Palmate newt (Lissotriton helveticus)	Present in modern Britain	
Common toad (Bufo bufo)	Present in modern Britain	
Natterjack toad (Bufo calamita)	Present in modern Britain	
Common spadefoot (Pelobates fuscus)	Species extant but no longer occurs in Britain	
Moor frog (Rana arvalis)	Species extant but no longer occurs in Britain	
Common frog (Rana temporaria)	Present in modern Britain	
Common parsley frog (Pelodytes punctatus)	Species extant but no longer occurs in Britain	
Marsh frog (Pelophylax ridibundus)	Species extant but no longer occurs in Britain	
Smooth snake (Coronella austriaca)	Species extant but no longer occurs in Britain	
Grass snake (Natrix natrix)	Species identification was made prior to the split between Natrix natrix (which is not native to modern Britain) and Natrix helvetica, (the barred grass snake), which is	
Slow worm (Anguis fragilis)	Present in modern Britain	
Viviparous lizard (Zootoca vivipara)	Present in modern Britain	
Whooper swan (Cygnus cf. cygnus)	Present in modern Britain	
Greylag goose (Anser anser)	Present in modern Britain	
Mallard (Anas platyrhynchos)	Present in modern Britain	
Eurasian wigeon (Anas penelope)	Present in modern Britain	
Garganey (Spatula querquedula)	Present in modern Britain	
Eurasian teal (Anas crecca)	Present in modern Britain	
Tufted duck (Aythya fuligula)	Present in modern Britain	
Common goldeneye (Bucephala clangula)	Present in modern Britain	
Grey partridge (Perdix perdix)	Present in modern Britain	
Common moorhen (Gallinula chloropus)		
Scolopacidae or Charadriidae	Indeterminate shorebird remains	
Black-headed gull (Chroicocephalus ridibundus)	Present in modern Britain	
Kittiwake (Rissa cf R. tridactyla)	Present in modern Britain	
†Great auk (Pinguinus impennis)	Native to Britain until historical times (extinct 1844). Boxgrove record one of the oldest of the species.	
Tawny owl (Strix aluco)	Present in modern Britain	
Common swift (Apus apus)	Present in modern Britain	
European robin (Erithacus rubecula)	Present in modern Britain	
Dunnock (Prunella cf P. modularis)	Present in modern Britain	
Common starling (Sturnus vulgaris)	Present in modern Britain	
Erinaceus sp.	Closely related to the modern European hedgehog (Erinaceus europaeus), which is present in Britain today	Modern European hedgehog (Erinaceus europaeus)
Neomys sp.	Closely related to the modern Eurasian water shrew (Neomys fodiens), which is present in Britain today	Modern Eurasian water shrew (Neomys fodiens)
Eurasian pygmy shrew (Sorex minutus)	Present in modern Britain	
†Sorex runtonensis	An extinct species of shrew	
†Sorex (Drepanosorex) savini	An extinct species of shrew	
European mole (Talpa europaea)	Present in modern Britain	
†Talpa minor	An extinct species of mole	
Common long-eared bat (Plecotus auritus)	Present in modern Britain	
Whiskered bat (Myotis mystacinus)	Present in modern Britain	
Bechstein's bat (Myotis bechsteinii)	Present in modern Britain	
†Canis mosbachensis	A smaller ancestor of the modern grey wolf (Canis lupus)	
†Ursus deningeri	A large bear, ancestral to the later cave bear (Ursus spelaeus)	Skeleton from France
Stoat (Mustela erminea)	Present in modern Britain	
European mink (Mustela lutreola)	Species extant but no longer occurs in Britain	
Least weasel (Mustela nivalis)	Present in modern Britain	
Meles sp.	Closely related to the modern European badger (Meles meles), which is present in Britain today	Modern European badger (Meles meles)
Crocuta	Originally assigned to the living spotted hyena (Crocuta crocuta), though the taxonomy of Middle Pleistocene European Crocuta is complex and some authors consider remains form this time period to belong to extinct species distinct from the living spotted hyena, such as Crocuta spelaea.	Modern spotted hyena (Crocuta crocuta)
European wildcat (Felis cf F. silvestris)	Still present in Britain today. One of the oldest known records of European wildcats, and displays transitional characters with earlier F. lunensis	
†Panthera fossilis	A large lion, originally assigned to the modern lion (Panthera leo), ancestor of the later cave lion (Panthera spelaea)	
Elephantidae	Indeterminate elephantid remains likely assignable to the steppe mammoth (Mammuthus trogontherii) or straight-tusked elephant (Palaeoloxodon antiquus)	
Wild horse (Equus ferus)	Still extant but no longer present in Britain (extinct c. 8000 BC)	Modern Przewalski's Horse
†Stephanorhinus hundsheimensis	An extinct large species of rhinoceros belonging to the genus Stephanorhinus	Skull of Stephanorhinus hundsheimensis on display in Germany
Red deer (Cervus elaphus)	Present in modern Britain	
Roe deer (Capreolus capreolus)	Present in modern Britain	
†Dama roberti	Originally referred to the living European fallow deer (Dama dama)	
†Praemegaceros dawkinsi	Moderately sized "giant deer"	
†Praemegaceros cf. verticornis	Large sized "giant deer"	Skeleton of P. verticornis from Germany
Bison sp.	Originally assigned to the steppe bison (Bison priscus)	Modern European bison (Bison bonasus)
Caprinae	Indeterminate goat-antelope	
Sciurus sp.	A tree squirrel	Modern red squirrel (Sciurus vulgaris)
Wood lemming (Myopus schisticolor)	Still extant but no longer present in Britain	
Norway lemming (Lemmus lemmus)	Still extant but no longer present in Britain	
Bank vole (Clethrionomys glareolus)	Present in modern Britain	
Grey-sided vole (Craseomys rufocanus)	Still extant but no longer present in Britain	
†Pliomys episcopalis	Extinct species of vole	
†Arvicola terrestris cantiana	Extinct species ancestral to or paleosubspecies of the European water vole (Arvicola amphibius/terrestris), which is present in Britain today	Modern European water vole (Arvicola amphibius/terrestris)
European pine vole (Microtus cf. subterraneus)	Still extant but no longer present in Britain	
Field vole (Microtus agrestis)	Present in modern Britain	
Common vole (Microtus arvalis)	Still extant but no longer present in Britain	
Narrow-headed vole (Stenocranius gregalis)	Still extant but no longer present in Britain	
Tundra vole (Alexandromys oeconomus)	Still extant but no longer present in Britain	
Eurasian beaver (Castor fiber)	Historically native to Britain until 16th century. Reintroduced.	
Hazel dormouse (Muscardinus avellanarius)	Present in modern Britain	
Garden dormouse (Eliomys quercinus)	Still extant but no longer present in Britain	
Northern birch mouse (Sicista betulina)	Still extant but no longer present in Britain	
†Apodemus maastrichtensis	Extinct species of field/wood mouse	
Wood mouse (Apodemus sylvaticus)	Present in modern Britain	
Mountain hare (Lepus timidus)	Present in modern Britain	
European rabbit (Oryctolagus cf. cuniculus)	Present in modern Britain due to introductions in Antiquity and the Middle Ages	

Numerous species of animals, including snails, fish, lizards, amphibians including frogs and salamanders, and 50 species of mammals have been found at the site, many of which are still extant and a large subset of which still live in Britain today. Others, such as the European pine vole (Microtus subterraneus), which is one of the most common animals at the site, no longer inhabit Britain but are present in the European continental mainland. The site may contain the earliest record of the recently extinct Great auk (Pinguinus impennis).^{157-274} Remains of large animals have been found at the site, including rhinoceroses and indeterminate elephants (likely either the steppe mammoth Mammuthus trogontherii or the straight-tusked elephant Palaeoloxodon antiquus).^{226,229} These include large carnivores, such as the grey wolf ancestor Canis mosbachensis, the large lion Panthera fossilis and Crocuta hyenas, originally attributed to the living spotted hyena (Crocuta spelaea),^{224} though other authors have argued that European Crocuta hyena remains from this time period should be attributed to the cave hyena (Crocuta spelaea). Several species of mammals found at the site became extinct during the Anglian glacial period that followed the deposition of the Boxgrove site, and are not present in the following Hoxnian interglacial (MIS 11) or later interglacials. These include Ursus deningeri (an early member of the cave bear lineage), members of the giant deer genus Praemegaceros, including the smaller British endemic P. dawkinsi and probably the larger P. verticornis, possibly the reindeer sized deer species Megaloceros/Praedama savini, the rhinoceros Stephanorhinus hundsheimensis, the extinct vole Pliomys episcopalis and the extinct long-tailed shrew Sorex savini. These taxa, in combination with archaic forms of the water vole (Arvicola) and narrow-headed vole (Stenocranius gregalis, which no longer occurs in Britain), constrain the age of the site to the end of Marine Isotope Stage 13.

=== Archaeology ===
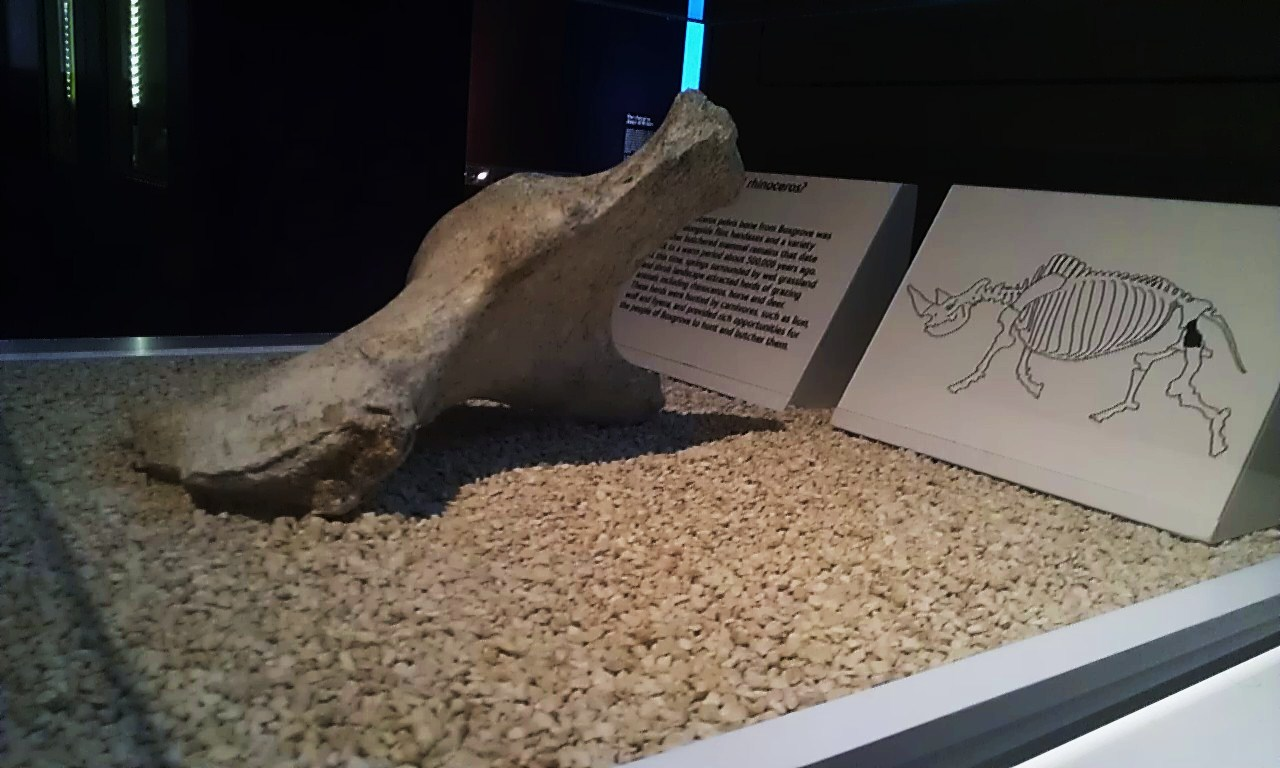
A butchered bone of the rhinoceros Stephanorhinus hundsheimensis found at the site

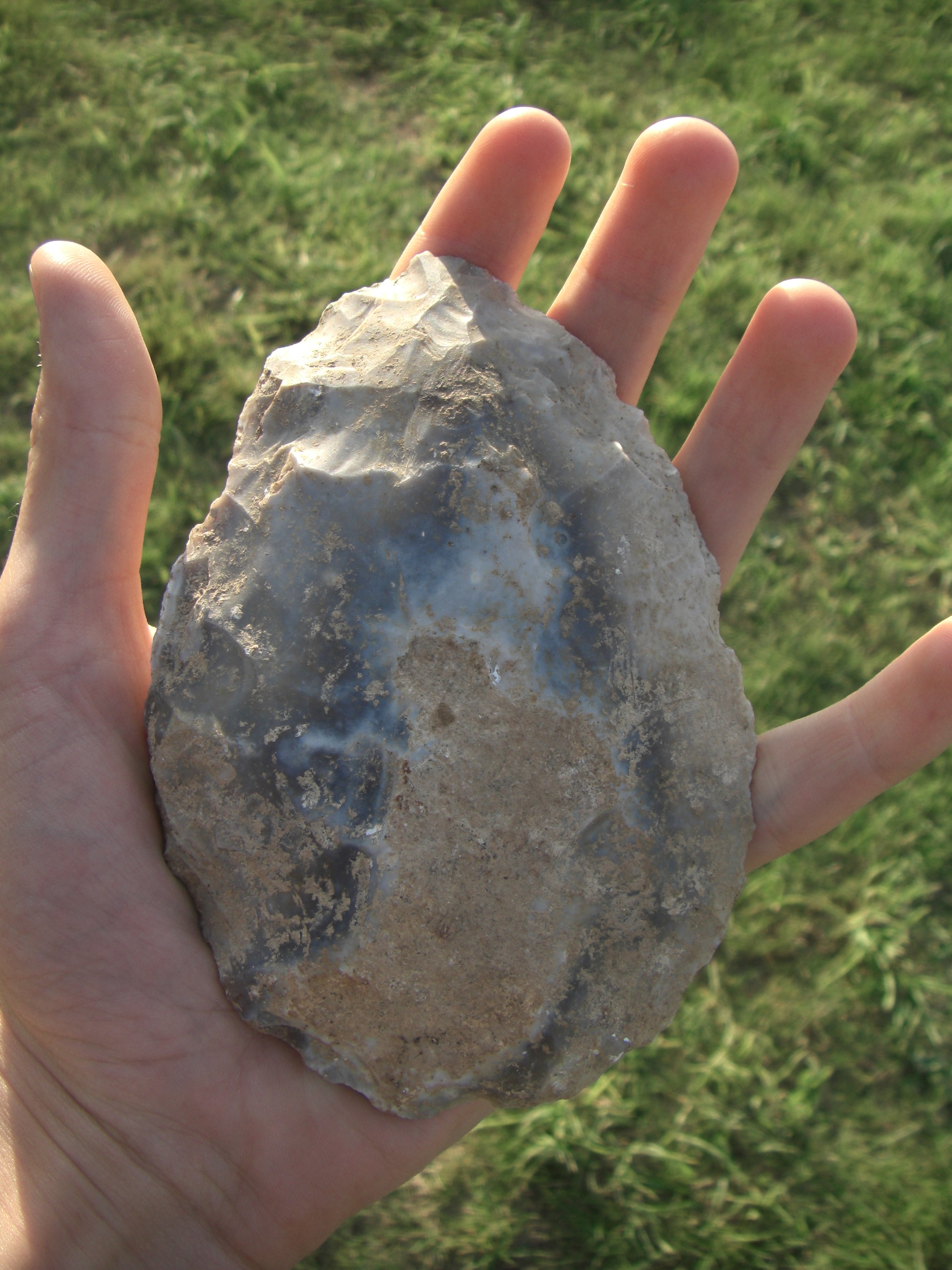
One of hundreds of handaxes found at the site

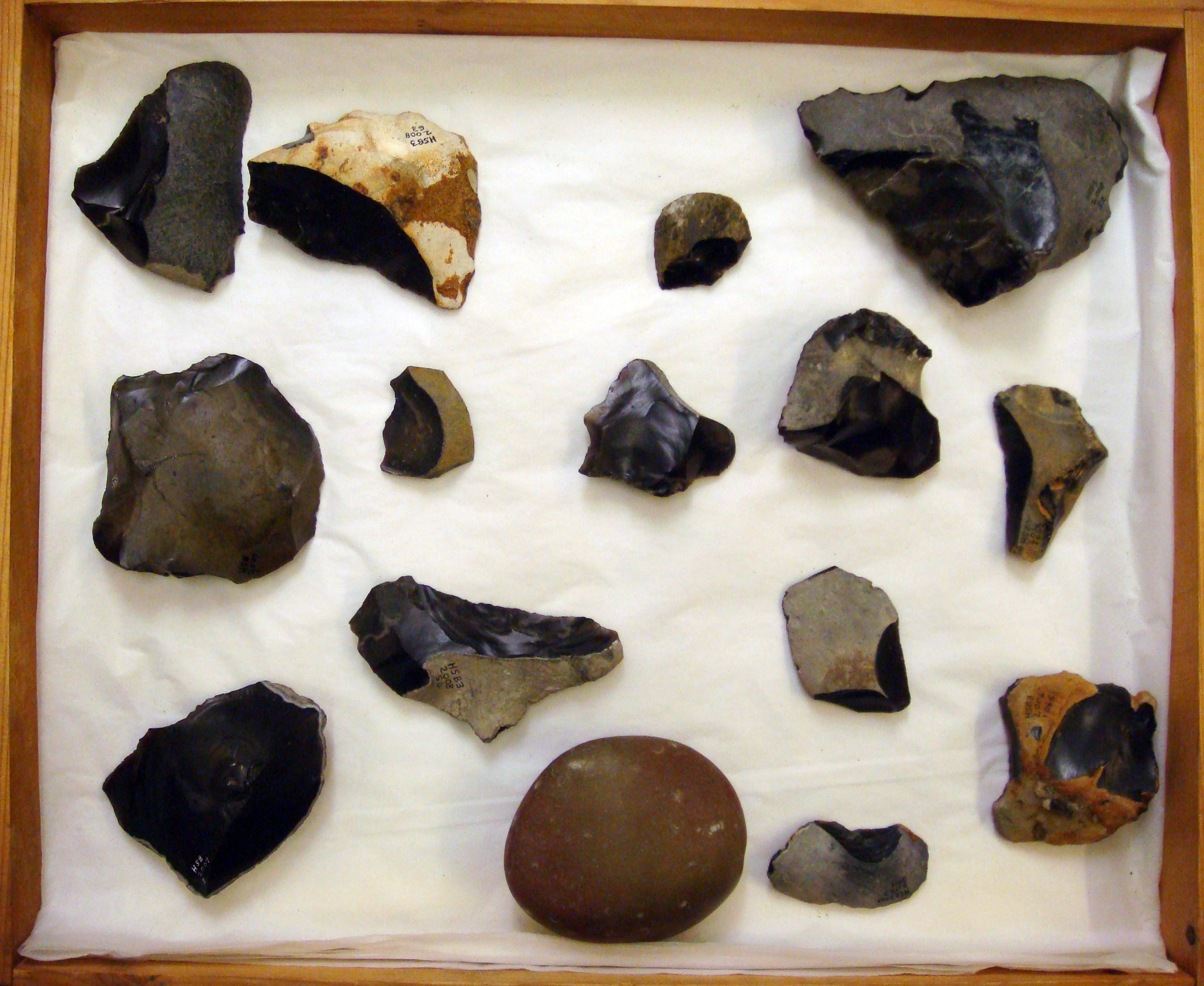
Tray of Boxgrove flints (not on display) at the British Museum

Evidence of human activity extends throughout the site, even into the marine layers of the Slindon Sand Member, where human modified animal bones have been found.^{397} Numerous Acheulean flint tools, including handaxes, were found at the site. The handaxes are ovate in form, and show evidence of being finely worked by experienced and skilled flintknappers, as evidenced by their thinness (the thinner a handaxe becomes, the more efficient it is as a cutting tool, but the more likely it becomes to break during knapping), the thinnest known from the entire Acheulean. Wear analysis suggests that the handaxes at Boxgrove were primarily if not exclusively used for animal butchery.

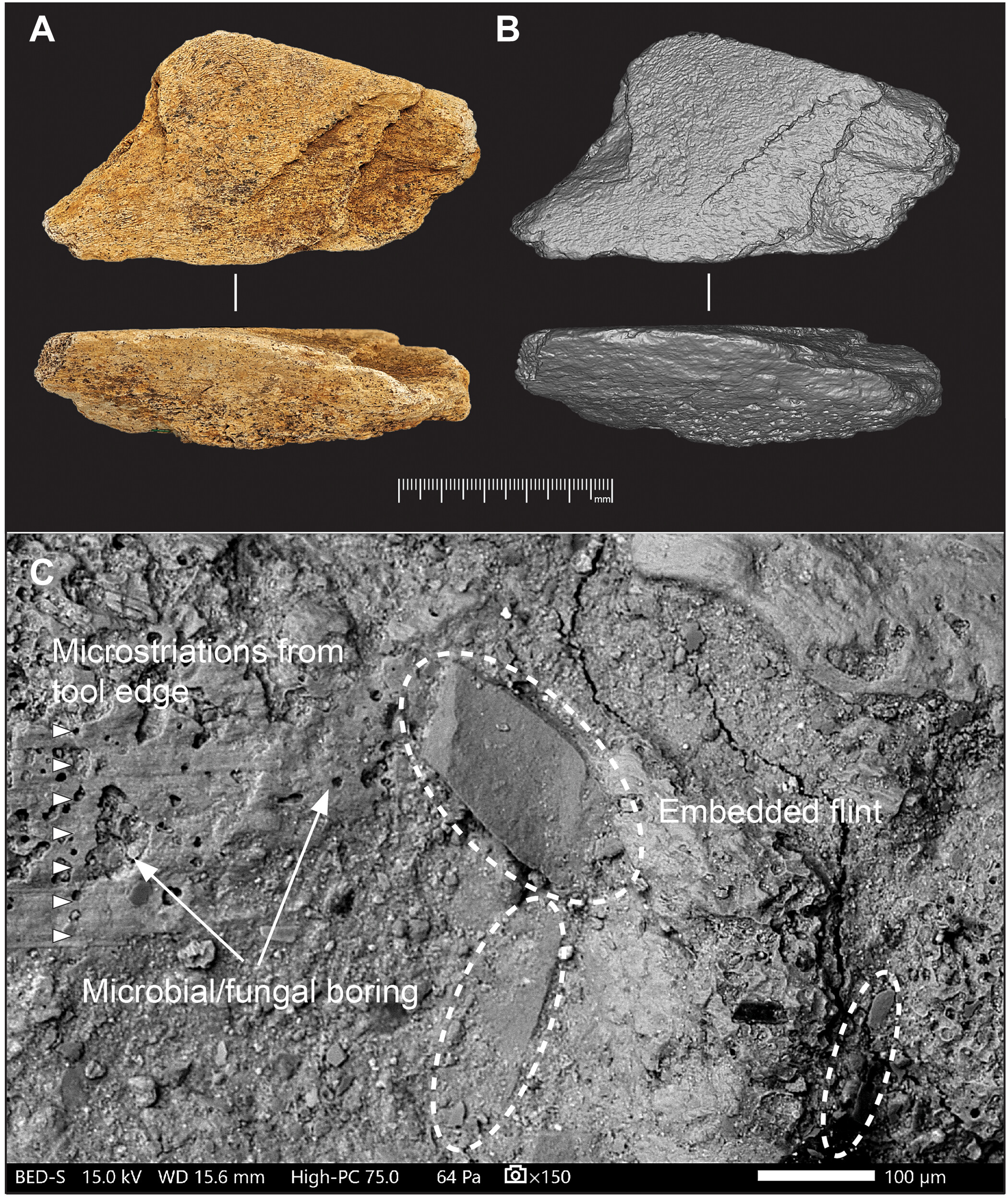
Soft hammer found at Boxgrove made of the outer cortex of an elephant limb bone, with scanning electron microscope image showing flint chips embedded in the bone (bottom) as a result of its use

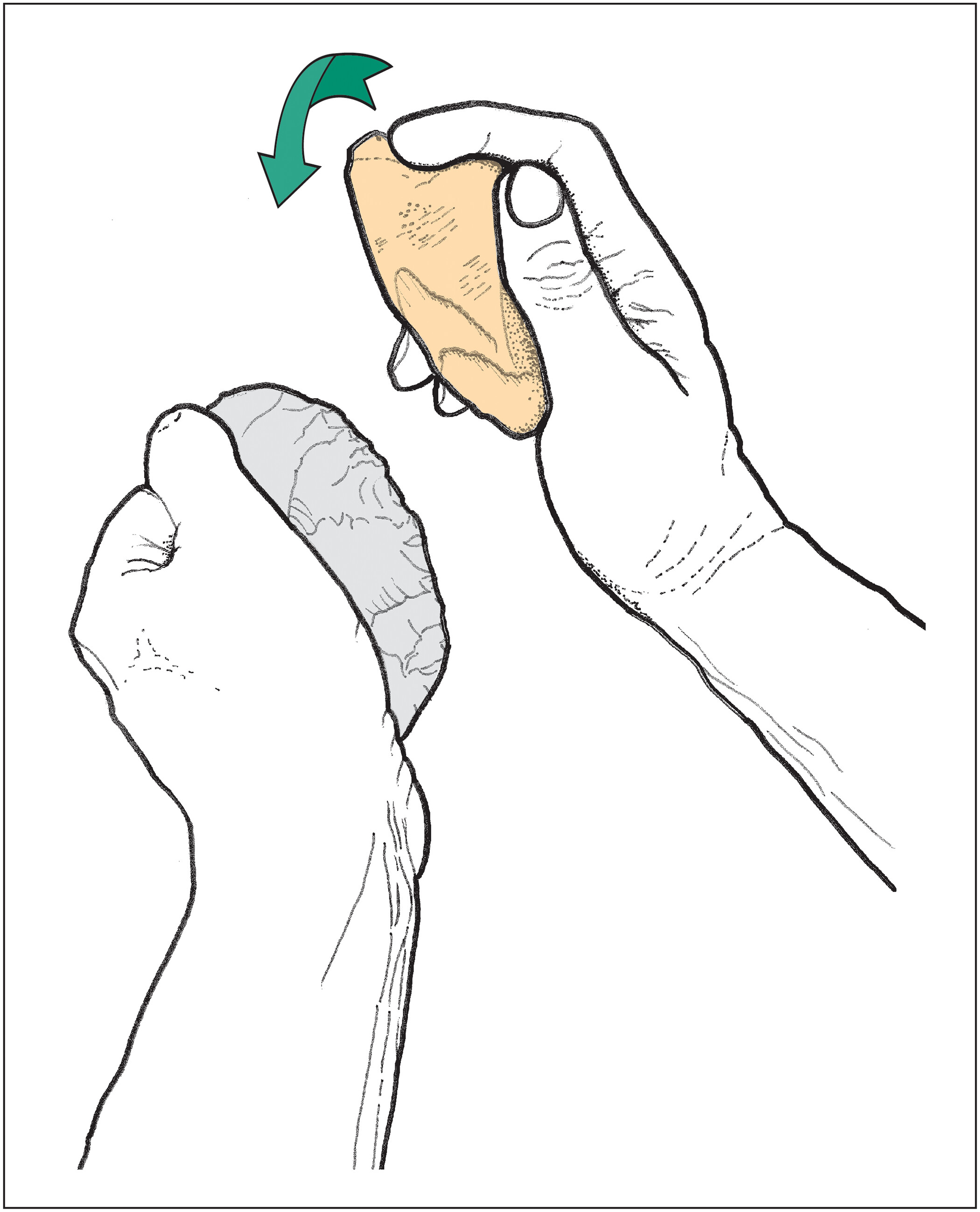
Proposed usage of the elephant bone soft hammer to resharpen handaxes

Well preserved flint scatters, still largely in situ, resulting from the production of stone tools at a number of Boxgrove sub-localities allow the process of stone tool manufacture to be reconstructed in high detail. A number of animal remains at the site show evidence of butchery, likely for both meat and skin, including bison, wild horse, deer, including giant deer (Praemegaceros cf. verticornis) and red deer (Cervus elaphus), the bear Ursus deningeri, and the rhinoceros Stephanorhinus hundsheimensis.^{396} Evidence has also been found for bones (including those of elephants, rhinoceros, bovids, horse and giant deer) and deer antlers at Boxgrove being used as "soft hammers" to work stone, likely at least for the fine shaping and sharpening of the handaxes.^{394-5}

At site Q1/B, also known as the "waterhole", a spring fed a small freshwater lake within a grassland environment, the depositional layers of which contains numerous animal bones and large concentrations of stone tools, including flakes and handaxes, which experienced subsequent limited disturbance by water flow, with the artifacts still exhibiting high levels of sharpness comparable to that when they were originally knapped.

One of the most important sub-localities within Boxgrove is GTP17, where fragmentary skeletal remains of a large adult female wild horse (assigned to the extinct horse species Equus mosbachensis) around 4-5 years of age and probably around 600 kilograms (1,300 lb) in body mass, was found with marks indicating it was extensively butchered by humans very shortly after death, on what was then a tidal mudflat close to the shoreline, around 40–60 metres (130–200 ft) away from chalk cliffs, from which the humans selected flint nodules to turn into tools to butcher the horse, a number of which were found surrounding the skeleton. The butchery included extensive cracking of the bones probably to extract marrow and bone grease. An unusual curved fracture on one of the horse's shoulder blades has often been suggested to represent a spear wound, which if correct would represent the oldest evidence of spear hunting in the archaeological record, beating the Clacton spear by several tens of thousands of years. However, a study in 2025 which used experimental testing of thrusting wooden spears into horse carcasses found that it was more likely that the fracture was created during the butchery process using a hammerstone, perhaps to extract grease from the scapula. Regardless it is thought likely that the horse was probably hunted. Following human butchery, the carcass was subsequently scavenged by hyenas.

=== Human remains ===
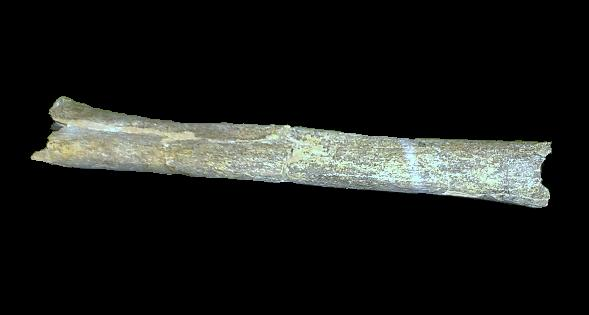
The tibia from Boxgrove

Remains of an archaic human provisionally thought to be a member of the Homo heidelbergensis subspecies were first found on the site in 1993, consisting of the partial midsegment (diaphysis) of a tibia of belonging to an individual probably stood 1.8m high and weighed approximately 80 kg. The tibia is relatively stocky like those of other archaic humans. In 1994, two incisor teeth from the lower jaw, probably belonging the same individual (though probably not the same person as the tibia) were also reported from the site. The teeth display scratch marks that may have been made when using stone tools near the mouth.

== Excavation and research history ==
The Boxgrove site was first discovered by the archaeologist Andrew Woodcock and the geologist Roy Shephard-Thorn in 1974. During the first stages of gravel extraction, their investigations showed a series of marine deposits, overlain by gravels, were preserved within the quarry. Woodcock recorded exceptionally well preserved Acheulean artefacts and mammalian fauna at the intersection between these sediments and determined the potential importance of the site.

"Boxgrove is simply one of the great Early Palaeolithic/Middle Pleistocene sites in the world, this statement has nothing to do with ego or anything else personal to myself - it just is. The quality of preservation, the range and depth of its myriad lines of multidisciplinary evidence are beyond nearly all other sites."

— Mark Roberts (2011)

Between 1982 and 1996 a series of excavations were undertaken at the site by the UCL Institute of Archaeology with funding from Historic England. The excavations were directed by Mark Roberts of the UCL Institute of Archaeology, with successive co-direction by Martin Bates and Simon Parfitt.

In 2003 English Heritage announced it would buy the western quarry (known as Quarry 1) to ensure the preservation of the site complex.

In August 2020 archaeologists said they had discovered the earliest bone tools ever found in Europe at the site. They said that it "provides further evidence that early human populations at Boxgrove were cognitively, socially, and culturally sophisticated".

=== Publication ===
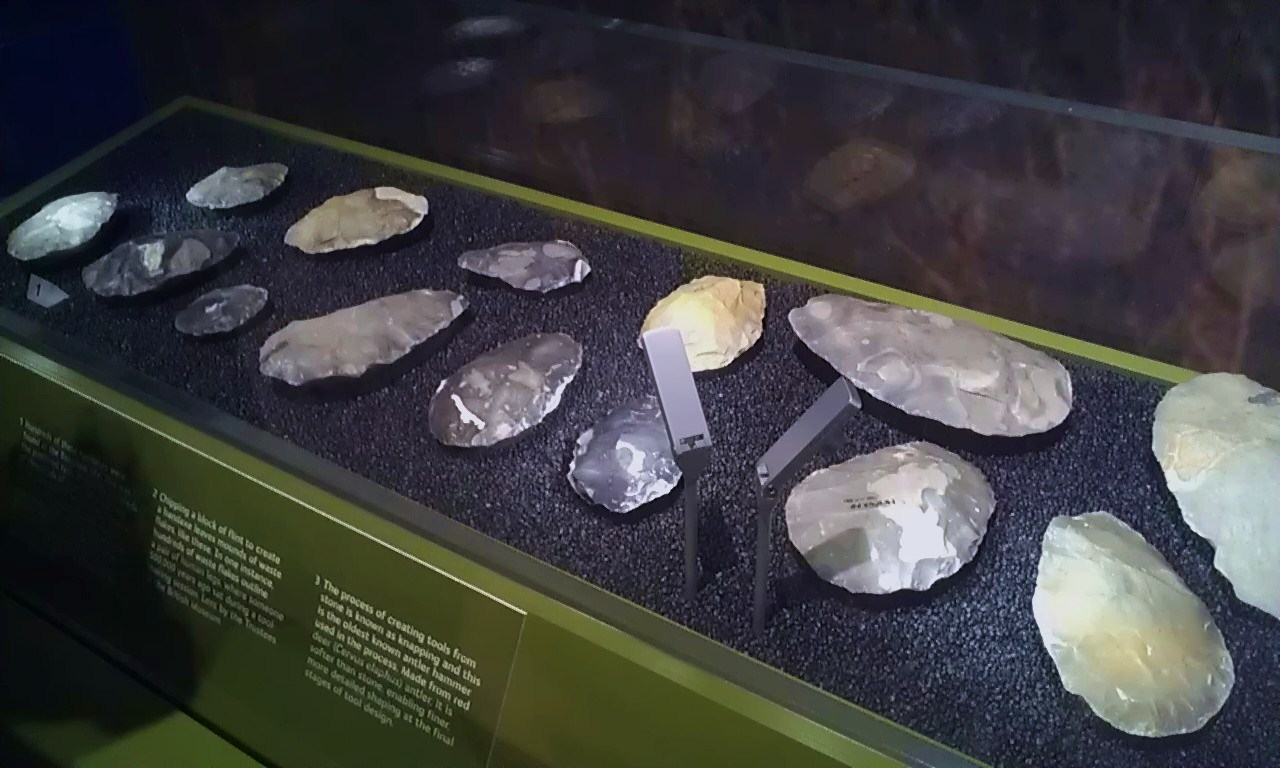
Selection of stone tools from Boxgrove exhibited at the Natural History Museum

In addition to over twenty scientific papers, the site is published through two monographs:

- Boxgrove: A Middle Pleistocene Hominid Site at Eartham Quarry, Boxgrove, West Sussex. Edited by Mark Roberts and Simon Parfitt Boxgrove: A Middle Pleistocene hominid site at Eartham Quarry, Boxgrove, West Sussex is now available through the Archaeology Data Service.
- The Horse Butchery Site: A High Resolution Record of Lower Palaeolithic Hominin Behaviour at Boxgrove, UK. Edited by Matthew Pope, Simon Parfitt and Mark Roberts.

In 1998, Roberts co-wrote a book about the site with prehistoric archaeologist Mike Pitts titled Fairweather Eden: Life in Britain half a million years ago as revealed by the excavations at Boxgrove. Published by Arrow Books, Fairweather Eden was designed for a popular audience.

== See also ==
- Gough's Cave
- Genetic history of the British Isles
- Happisburgh
- Kents Cavern
- List of human evolution fossils
- List of prehistoric structures in Great Britain
- Prehistoric Britain
- Paviland
- Pontnewydd
- Swanscombe
