= Boxgrove Man =

Hominin fossil

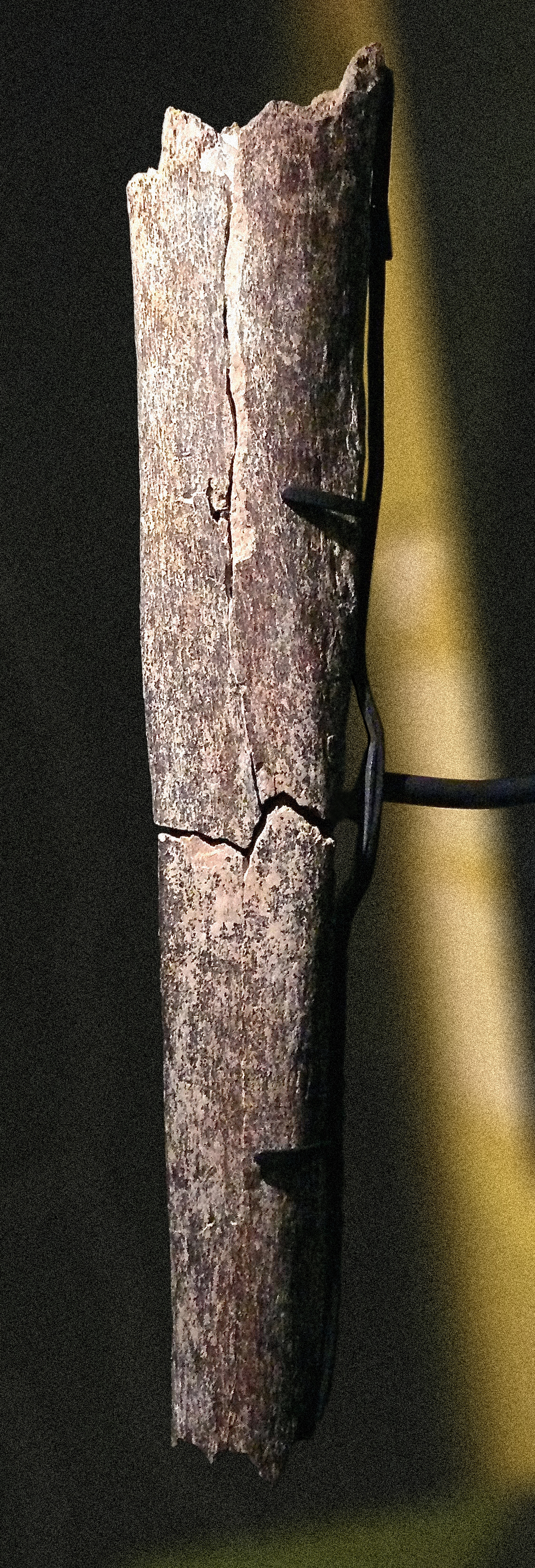
- Tibia from Boxgrove Man
- Common name: Boxgrove Man
- Species: Homo sp. possibly Homo heidelbergensis
- Age: 480,000 years, Marine Isotope Stage 13, Middle Pleistocene
- Place discovered: Boxgrove, England, United Kingdom
- Date discovered: 1993
- Discovered by: Mark Roberts

Boxgrove Man is a name given to three fossils of early humans, possibly Homo heidelbergensis, found at the Boxgrove site in Sussex, England and dated to about 480,000 years old. The fossils include the shaft of a tibia (shinbone) and two incisor teeth of the lower jaw. The two incisors probably belonged to the same individual but not the same individual represented by the tibia. The tibia was of a mature robustly built adult, and the teeth are similar to those of the similarly aged Spanish Sima de los Huesos hominins which genetic evidence indicates are early members of the Neanderthal line. They are the oldest fossils of the genus Homo found in Britain.

== Fossils ==
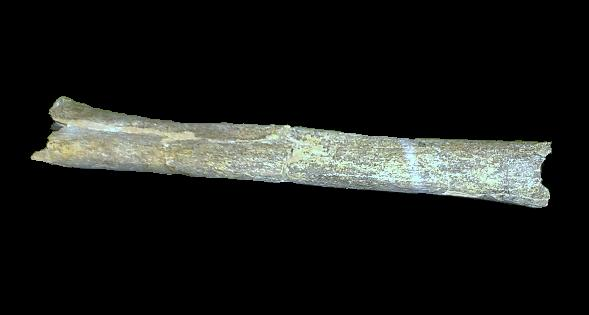
Alternate view of the tibia

The site of Boxgrove in Sussex dates to the late Cromerian Stage, around 500,000 years ago, and it is the earliest site in Britain with fossils of the genus Homo. The tibia was discovered in 1993 by archaeologist Mark Roberts and his team of the Institute of Archeology at University College London. The two teeth were found in 1995 and 1996 on returns to the site in the hope, which was realised, of finding further remains. The tibia was originally about 40 centimetres (1 ft 4 in) long and is of a well-built male with a height of 177–182 centimetres (5 ft 10 in – 6 ft 0 in). The teeth were lower incisors found about a metre apart and are thought to belong to the same individual, a mature adult. The exceptional structural strength suggests a cold-adapted body with proportions paralleling those of the Neanderthals. Archaeological evidence indicates that these early humans had the ability to hunt or at least scavenge with stone tools as the team discovered hundreds of Acheulean flint tools at the site. The two teeth found show scratches, suggesting an eating technique in which food was cut with a tool whilst gripped between the jaws.

== Archaeological context ==
The Boxgrove site is one of the most important Lower Palaeolithic sites in Europe. At the time of its deposition around 480,000 years ago during the relatively warm interglacial stage at the end of Marine Isotope Stage 13, despite now being located inland, Boxgrove was located on the coast, evolving initially from coastal mudflats beneath chalk cliffs of the South Downs to a mosaic of terrestrial woodland and grassland habitats with freshwater bodies such as springs and ponds as the sea retreated. The area at the time of deposition had a temperate climate similar to modern Britain. Many of the animals found at the Boxgrove site are still alive in Britain today, though others are more exotic, including elephants, rhinoceroses (Stephanorhinus hundsheimensis), hyenas (Crocuta), lions (Panthera fossilis) and giant deer (Praemegaceros). Alongside the remains of "Boxgrove Man", numerous stone tools, particularly handaxes, have been found, created using flint nodules from the chalk cliffs immediately north of the site, which display a high level of refinement indicating that they were worked by extensively experienced knappers that both had a high level of cognitive capability and dexterity, using the advanced "soft hammer" technique where flint is worked using bone and antler hammers, which represents the oldest evidence of "soft hammer" stone working in the world. Extensive evidence of animal butchery has also been found at the site.

== Comparative study ==
The discovery of the fossils of 29 individuals of a similar age at Sima de los Huesos in Spain has allowed scientists to gain a much greater understanding of the Boxgrove fossils by a comparative study in 2022. The tibia was found in a higher stratigraphical level than the teeth, and is unlikely to come from the same individual. The 2022 study has found that the teeth fit in the morphological range of the Sima de los huesos fossils, which have been identified by aDNA as early Neanderthals. The tibia falls outside the Sima de los Huesos range, and would fit the last common ancestor of modern humans and Neanderthals..

== See also ==
- Swanscombe Man A partial ~400,000 year old early human skull found near Swanscombe, Kent
