= Mike Pitts (archaeologist) =

English freelance journalist and archaeologist

Mike Pitts FSA
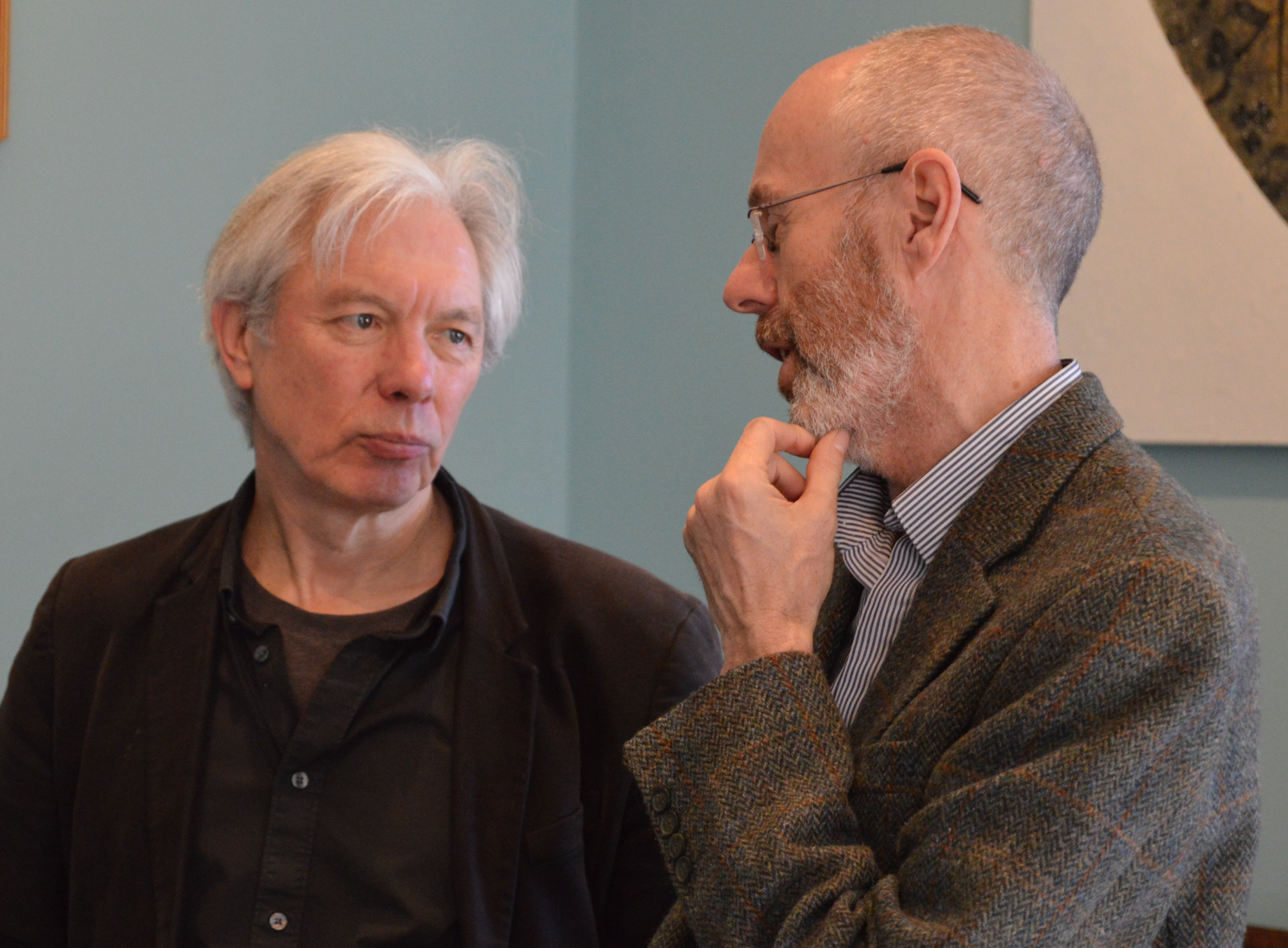
- Mike Pitts (left) with Mike Heyworth, Director of the Council for British Archaeology

Academic background
- Education: Institute of Archaeology

Academic work
- Discipline: Archaeology
- Sub-discipline: Prehistory; Stonehenge; Boxgrove Quarry
- Institutions: Alexander Keiller Museum; Council for British Archaeology; The Guardian

Michael W. Pitts, FSA, is an English freelance journalist and archaeologist who specialises in the study of British prehistory. He is the author of several books on the subject, and is the editor of British Archaeology, the publication of the Council for British Archaeology.

== Biography ==
He first studied archaeology at school, at Ardingly College in Sussex. He gained a degree in archaeology from the then-independent Institute of Archaeology in Bloomsbury, London before moving to Avebury, Wiltshire, as the Curator of the Alexander Keiller Museum. His first book, Fairweather Eden: Life in Britain half a million years ago as revealed by the excavations at Boxgrove (1998), which was co-written with fellow English archaeologist Mark Roberts, dealt with the excavations that had been undertaken at the Lower Palaeolithic site of Boxgrove Quarry by Roberts' team.

He directed excavations at Stonehenge 1979–80, and co-directed the excavation there of one of the Aubrey Holes in 2008. He regularly broadcasts on BBC radio as archaeologist and critic. In 2000 the British Archaeological Press Award was given "to the Guardian and their reporters Mike Pitts and Maev Kennedy for the consistent high standard of articles which appear in that paper". On 15 May 2003, he was elected a Fellow of the Society of Antiquaries of London (FSA).

== Bibliography ==
=== Academic ===
==== Books ====
- Later stone implements. Aylesbury: Shire Publications. 1980. ISBN 9780852635186.
- Footprints through Avebury. Avebury: Stones Print. 1985. ASIN B0058DCOUI.
- Stonehenge & Avebury: the greatest stone circles in the world. Avebury: Stones Print. 1994. ISBN 9780951407615.
- Fairweather Eden: Life in Britain half a million years ago as revealed by the excavations at Boxgrove. London: Arrow. 1997. ISBN 9780712676861. (with Mark Roberts)
- Hengeworld: Life in Britain 2000 BC as revealed by the latest discoveries at Stonehenge, Avebury and Stanton Drew. London: Century. 2000. ISBN 9780712679541.
- A Year at Stonehenge. London: Frances Lincoln. 2013. ISBN 9780711234833. (with James O. Davies, photographer)
- Digging for Richard III: How Archaeology Found the King. London: Thames and Hudson. 2014. ISBN 9780500252000.
- Pitts, Mike (15 March 2022). How to Build Stonehenge. London: National Geographic Books. ISBN 978-0-500-02419-5.
- Pitts, Mike (2025). Island at the Edge of the World: The Forgotten History of Easter Island – A Provocative Archaeological Study of Colonial Legacy, Indigenous Reclamation, and the Collapse Myth. London: Bloomsbury. ISBN 9781526667250.

==== Articles ====
- "Hides and antlers: a new look at the gatherer-hunter site at Star Carr, North Yorkshire, England”, World Archaeology 11 (1979), 32–42.
- “Some aspects of change in flaked stone industries of the mesolithic and neolithic in southern Britain”, Journal of Archaeological Science 6 (1979, with R Jacobi), 163–77.
- "On the road to Stonehenge: report on investigations beside the A344 in 1968, 1979 and 1980”, Proceedings of the Prehistoric Society 48 (1982), 75–132.
- "What future for Avebury?" Antiquity 64 (1990), 259–74.
- "The stone axe in neolithic Britain", Proceedings of the Prehistoric Society 61 (1996), 311–71.
- "Excavating the Sanctuary: new investigations on Overton Hill, Avebury”, Wiltshire Archaeological & Natural History Magazine 94 (2001), 1–23.
- “An Anglo-Saxon decapitation and burial at Stonehenge”, Wiltshire Archaeological & Natural History Magazine 95 (2002, with A Bayliss, J McKinley, A Boylston, P Budd, J Evans, C Chenery, A Reynolds & S Semple), 131–46.
- “A photo by Bill Brandt, and the intimacy of perceptions of Stonehenge and landscape”, Landscapes 9 (2008), 1–27.
- “A year at Stonehenge”, Antiquity 83 (2009), 184–94.
- Worrell, Sally; Jackson, Ralph; Mackay, Andrew; Bland, Roger; Pitts, Mike & Bradbury, Darren (January–February 2011). "The Crosby Garrett Roman Helmet". British Archaeology (116). Archived from the original on 1 February 2014.
- Pitts, Mike; Miles, Jason; Pagi, Hembo & Earl, Graeme (September 2014). "Hoa Hakananai'a: A new study of an Easter Island statue in the British Museum". The Antiquaries Journal. 94: 291–321. doi:10.1017/S0003581514000201.
- Pitts, Mike (October 2014). "More on Hoa Hakananai'a: Paint, petroglyphs, and a sledge, and the independent value of archaeological and historical evidence" (PDF). Rapa Nui Journal. 28 (2). Easter Island Foundation: 49–54.
- Pitts, Mike (May 2014). "Hoa Hakananai'a, an Easter Island statue now in the British Museum, photographed in 1868" (PDF). Rapa Nui Journal. 28 (1). Easter Island Foundation: 39–48.
- Miles, James; Pitts, Mike; Pagi, Hembo & Earl, Graeme (June 2014). "New applications of photogrammetry and reflectance transformation imaging to an Easter Island statue". Antiquity. 88 (340): 596–605. doi:10.1017/S0003598X00101206.

=== Journalistic ===
- "Homo alone... and not at all Neanderthal", Guardian Online (17 July 1997).
- "Bog bodies are the archaeologist's dream come true: The living dead”, Guardian Weekend (28 March 1998), 38–43.
- ”Obituary Gerald Hawkins”, Guardian (24 July 2003).
- ”Memory failures: the damage done to Babylon has impaired the prospect of understanding a glorious ancient civilisation”, Guardian (17 January 2005).
- ”Beginner's guide to archaeology”, Guardian G2 (28 August 2009).
- ”Are the Parthenon marbles really so special?” Guardian (3 April 2012).
