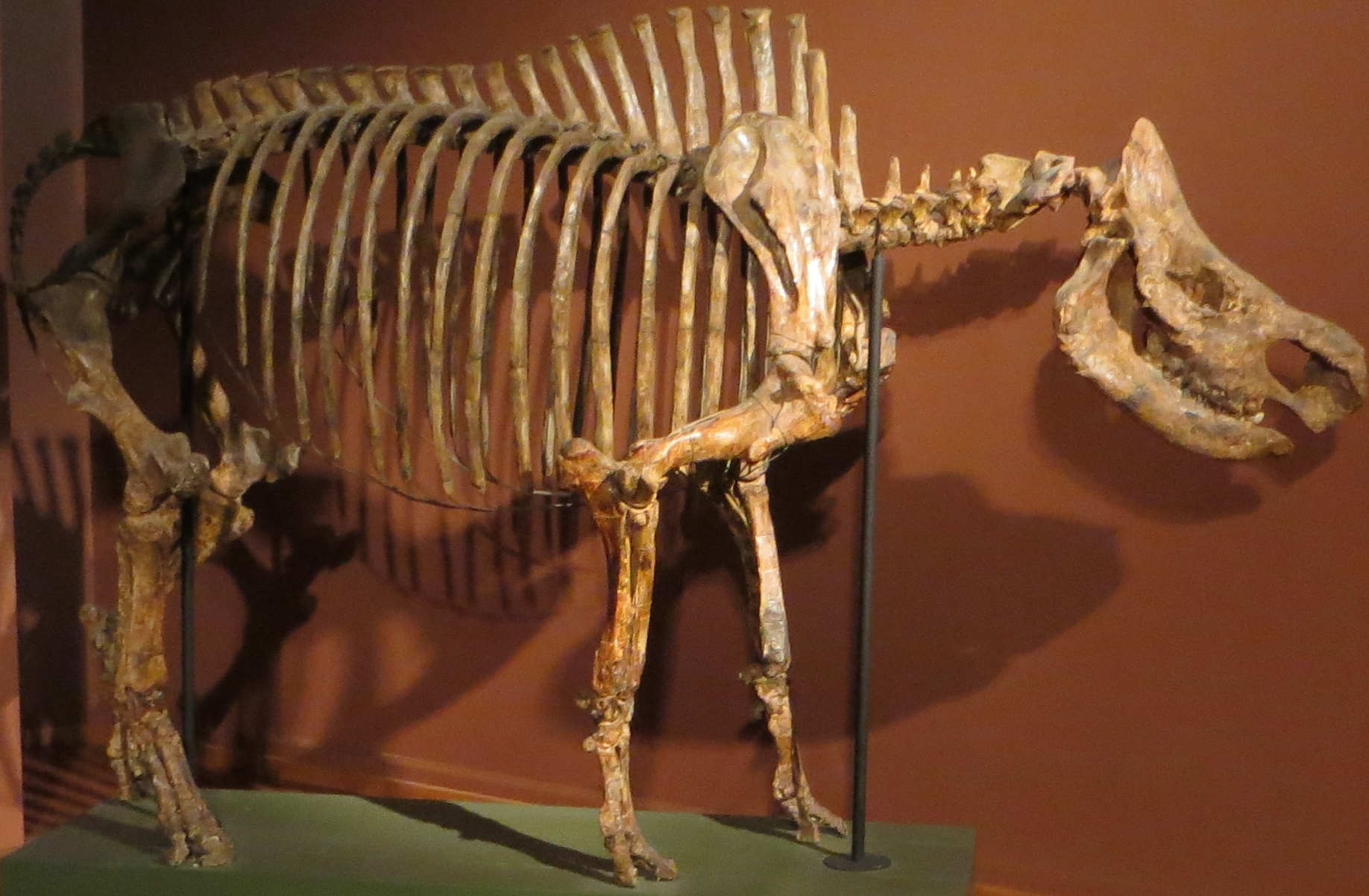
- Stephanorhinus etruscus skeleton
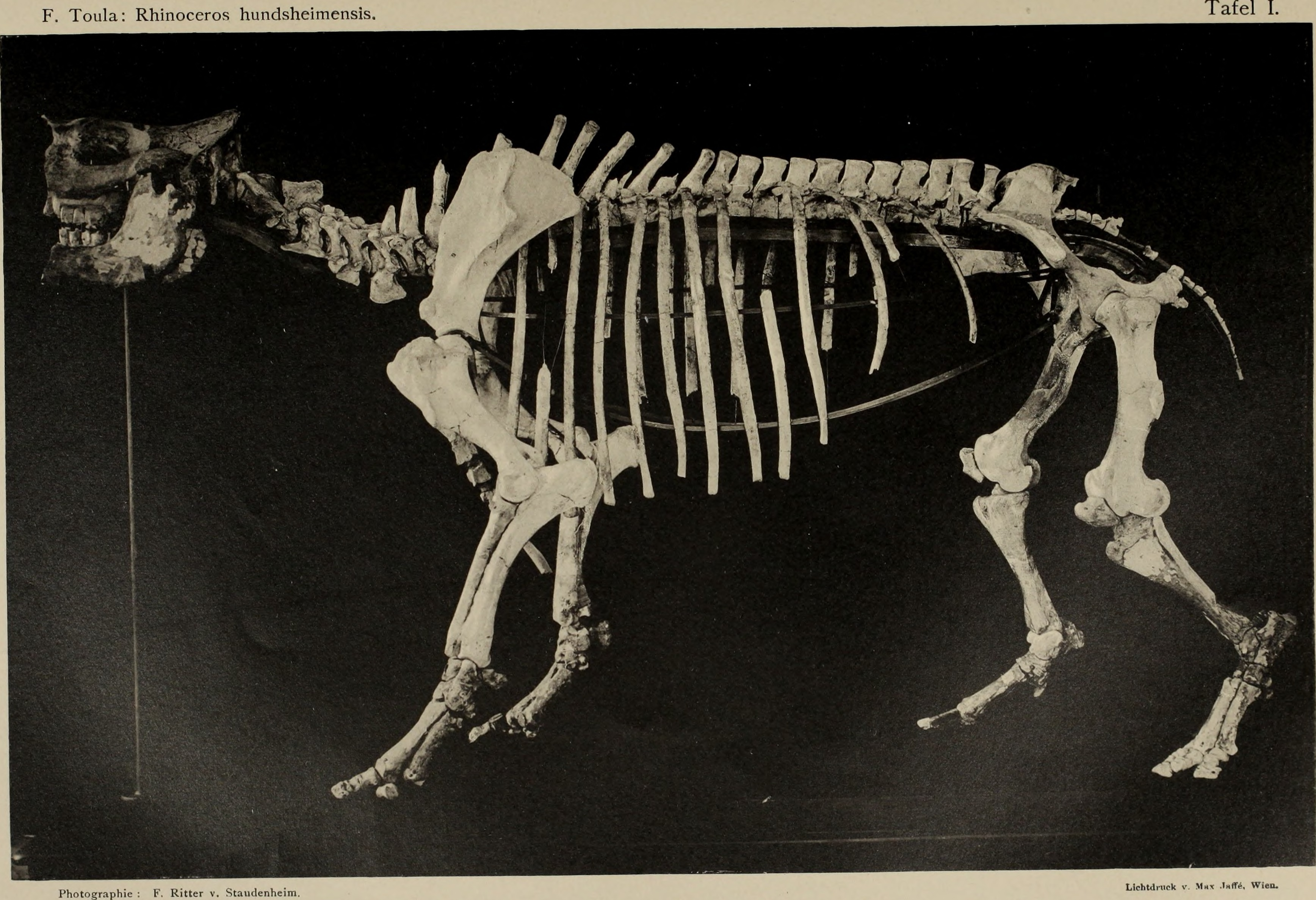
- Stephanorhinus hundsheimensis skeleton

Scientific classification
- Kingdom: Animalia
- Phylum: Chordata
- Class: Mammalia
- Order: Perissodactyla
- Family: Rhinocerotidae
- Tribe: Dicerorhinini
- Genus: †Stephanorhinus; Kretzoi, 1942

Type species
- †Rhinoceros etruscus Falconer, 1868

Species
- †S. etruscus (Falconer, 1868) Etruscan rhinoceros; †S. hemitoechus (Falconer, 1859) Narrow-nosed rhinoceros; †S. hundsheimensis (Toula, 1902) Hundsheim rhinoceros; †S. jeanvireti (Falconer, 1859); †S. kirchbergensis (Jäger, 1839) Merck's rhinoceros; †S. lantianensis (Hu and Qi, 1978); †S. yunchuchenensis (Chow, 1963); †S. megarhinus? (de Christol, 1834); †S. miguelcrusafonti? Guérin & Santafé-Lopis, 1978

Synonyms
- Brandtorhinus Guérin 1980; Procerorhinus Kretzoi, 1942

= Stephanorhinus =

Stephanorhinus Temporal range: Late Pliocene to Late Pleistocene 3.4–0.04 Ma Possible late Miocene and early Pliocene records

Extinct genus of rhinoceros

Stephanorhinus is an extinct genus of two-horned rhinoceros native to Eurasia and North Africa that lived from Late Miocene or Pliocene until their extinction in the Late Pleistocene. Species of Stephanorhinus were the predominant and often only species of rhinoceros in much of temperate Eurasia, especially Europe, for most of the Pleistocene. The last two species of Stephanorhinus – Merck's rhinoceros (S. kirchbergensis) and the narrow-nosed rhinoceros (S. hemitoechus) – went extinct during the latter half of the last glacial period.

== Taxonomy ==
The taxonomic history of Stephanorhinus is long and convoluted, as many species are known by numerous synonyms and different genera – typically placed in Rhinoceros and Dicerorhinus – for the 19th and most of the early 20th century. The genus was named by Miklós Kretzoi in 1942. The first part of the name, Stephano-, honours Stephen I, the first king of Hungary (the describer, Kretzoi, was Hungarian). The second part is from rhinos (Greek for "nose"), a typical suffix of rhinoceros genus names. Genomes obtained from Stephanorhinus kirchbergensis suggests that Stephanorhinus is more closely related to Dicerorhinus (which contains the living Sumatran rhinoceros) and Coelodonta (which contains the woolly rhinoceros), than it is to other living rhinoceroses, and is more closely related to Coelodonta than to Dicerorhinus, with the date of divergence between Coelodonta and Stephanorhinus estimated at around 5.5 million years ago, with the estimated split between their last common ancestor and Dicerorhinus estimated at around 9.4 million years ago. The genus is also closely related to the fossil rhinoceros genera Dihoplus and Pliorhinus, known from the Late Miocene and Pliocene of Eurasia, which may be ancestral to Stephanorhinus. Although a 2019 study based on dental proteomes suggested that the genus was paraphyletic with respect to Coelodonta, later studies have consistently recovered Stephanorhinus as monophyletic. However, it seems that Stephanorhinus and Coelodonta were capable of interbreeding, as evidenced by Stephanorhinus ancestry in some Late Pleistocene woolly rhinoceroses.

Truncated cladogram of Rhinocerotinae, showing the position of Stephanorhinus relative to living and Pleistocene rhinocerotine species based on morphological and genetic data, after Borrani et al. 2025.

- Rhinocerotinae
  - Dicerotini
    - White rhinoceros (Ceratotherium simum)
    - Black rhinoceros (Diceros bicornis)
  - - - Indian rhinoceros (Rhinoceros unicornis)
      - Javan rhinoceros (Rhinoceros sondaicus)
    - Dicerorhinina
      - Sumatran rhinoceros (Dicerorhinus sumatrensis)
      - - Woolly rhinoceros (Coelodonta antiquitatis)
        - Stephanorhinus
          - Stephanorhinus megarhinus
          - - Stephanorhinus jeanvireti
            - - - Stephanorhinus miguelcrusafonti
                - - Stephanorhinus etruscus
                  - Stephanorhinus hundsheimensis
              - - Narrow-nosed rhinoceros (Stephanorhinus hemitoechus)
                - Merck's rhinoceros (Stephanorhinus kirchbergensis)

== Description ==
Species of Stephanorhinus were large-sized rhinoceroses, with body masses estimated between 1,500–3,000 kilograms (3,300–6,600 lb). Stephanorhinus species have proportionally long (dolichocephalic) skulls. They had two horns, a frontal and a nasal horn. The nasal septum was partially ossified (turned to bone), which connected the nasal bones with the premaxillary bones. The incisors were either lost completely or very heavily reduced in size. Members of the genus also share some other characters of the shape of the skull, as well as the shape of the molars and premolars (such as the upper second molar/M2 bearing a metastyle as well as the lower second to fourth premolars p2-p4 lacking elongation or molarisation), as well as features of the limb and foot bones (such as having a weak lesser trochanter on the femur and a large entocuneiform bone in the hindfoot).^{Appendix S1} Species of Stephanorhinus differ from each other in skull shape and angle of the skull held relative to the ground, in the morphology of the teeth, and in the length and shape of the limb bones .

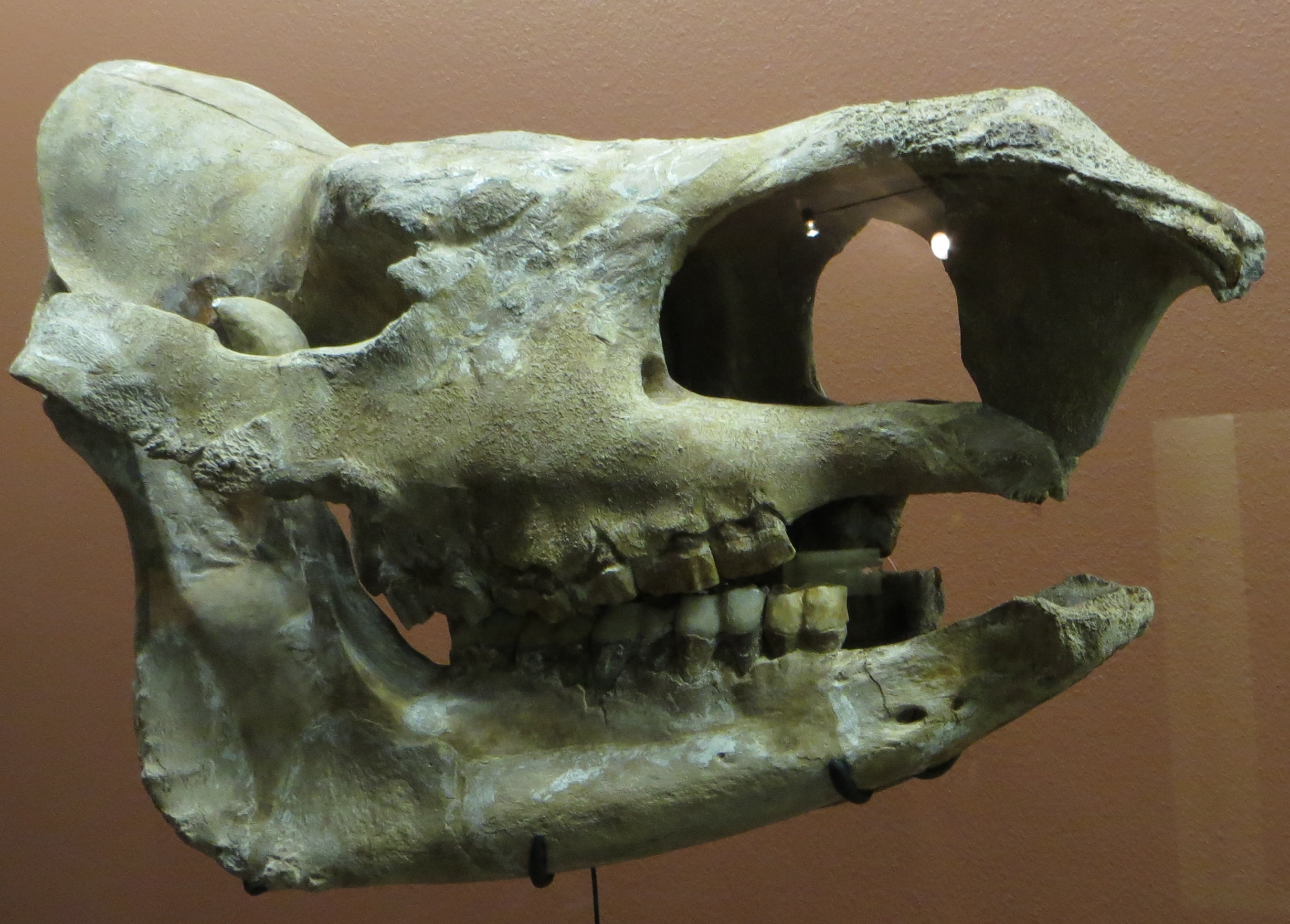
Skull of Stephanorhinus jeanvireti

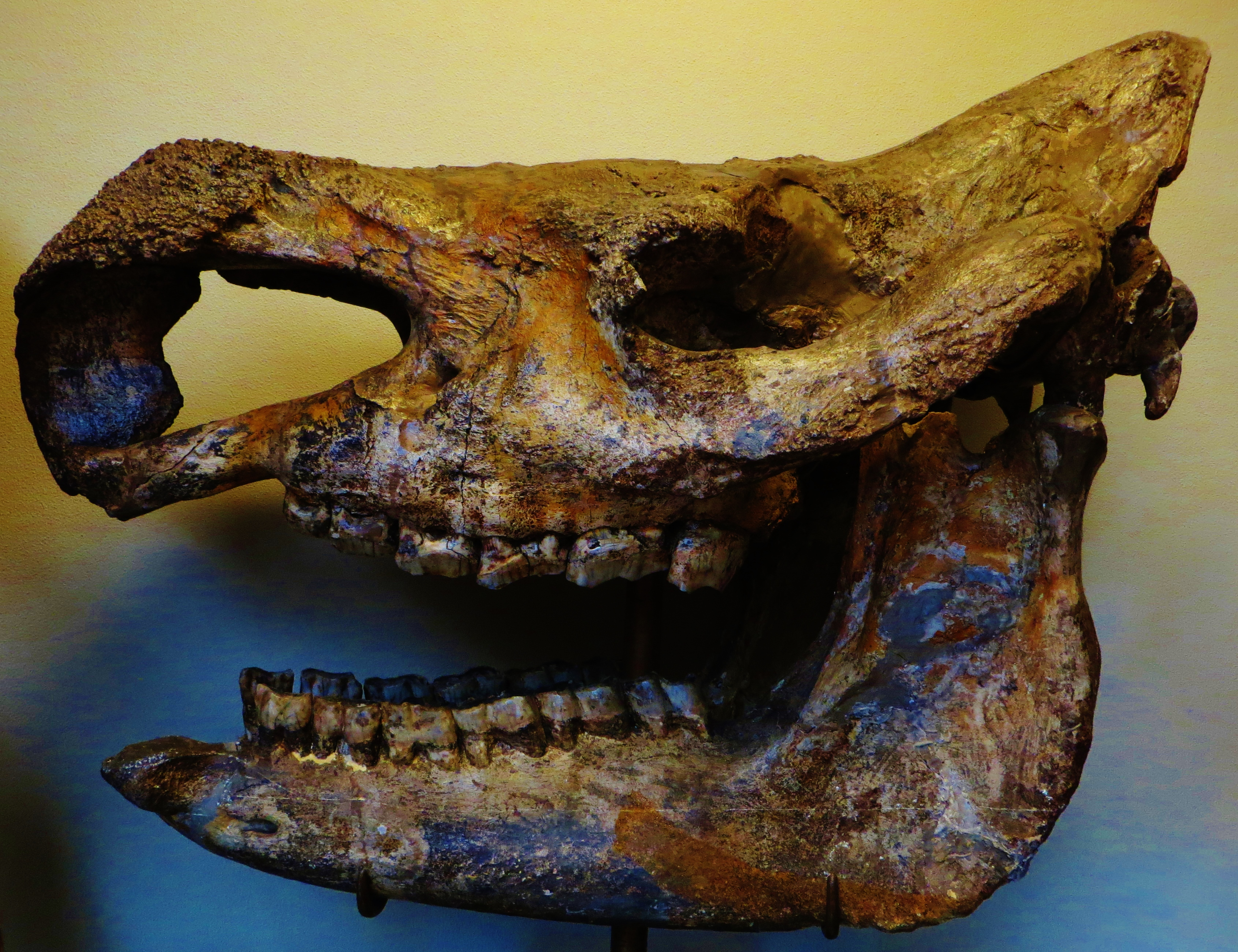
Skull of Stephanorhinus etruscus

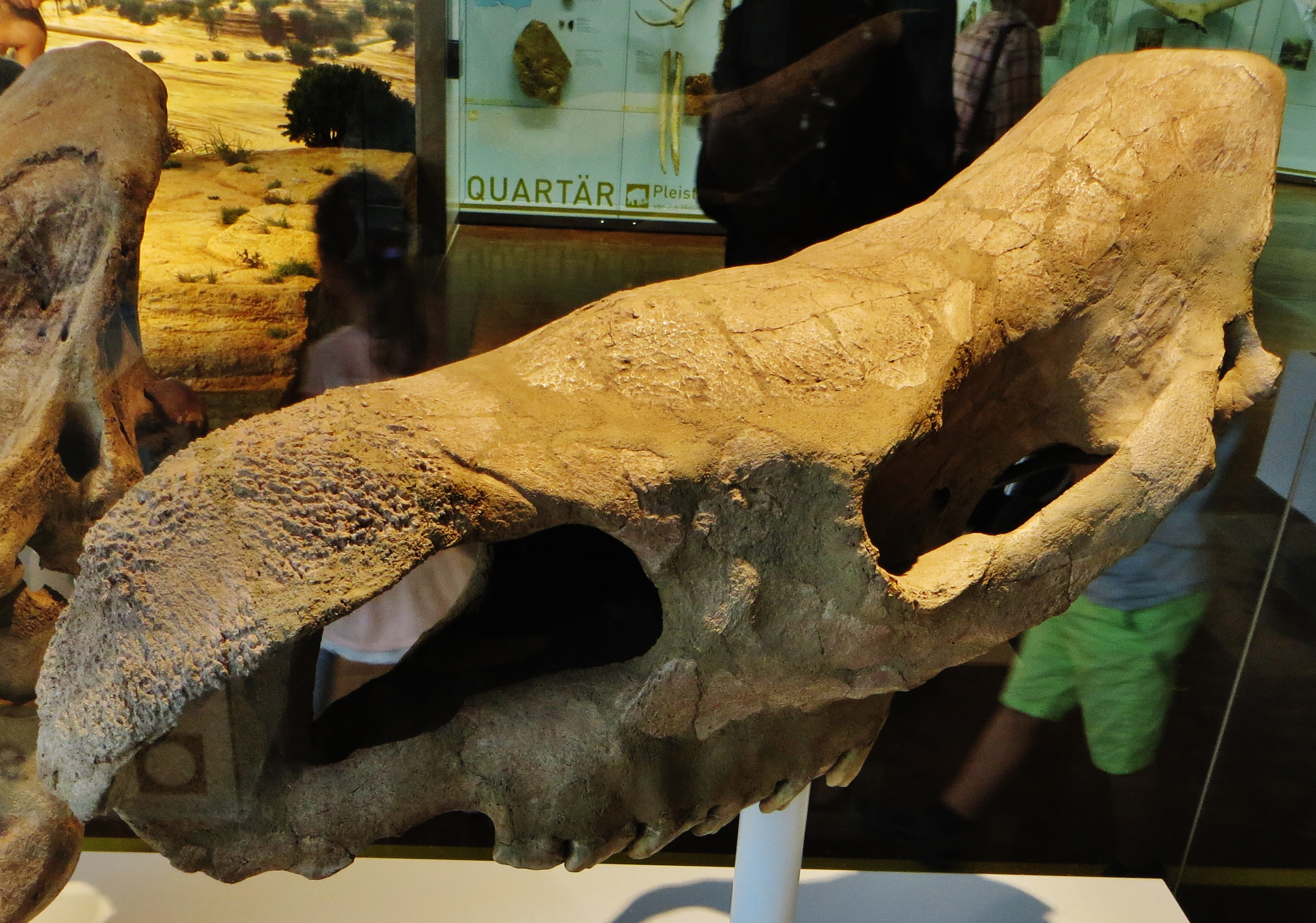
Skull of Stephanorhinus hundsheimensis

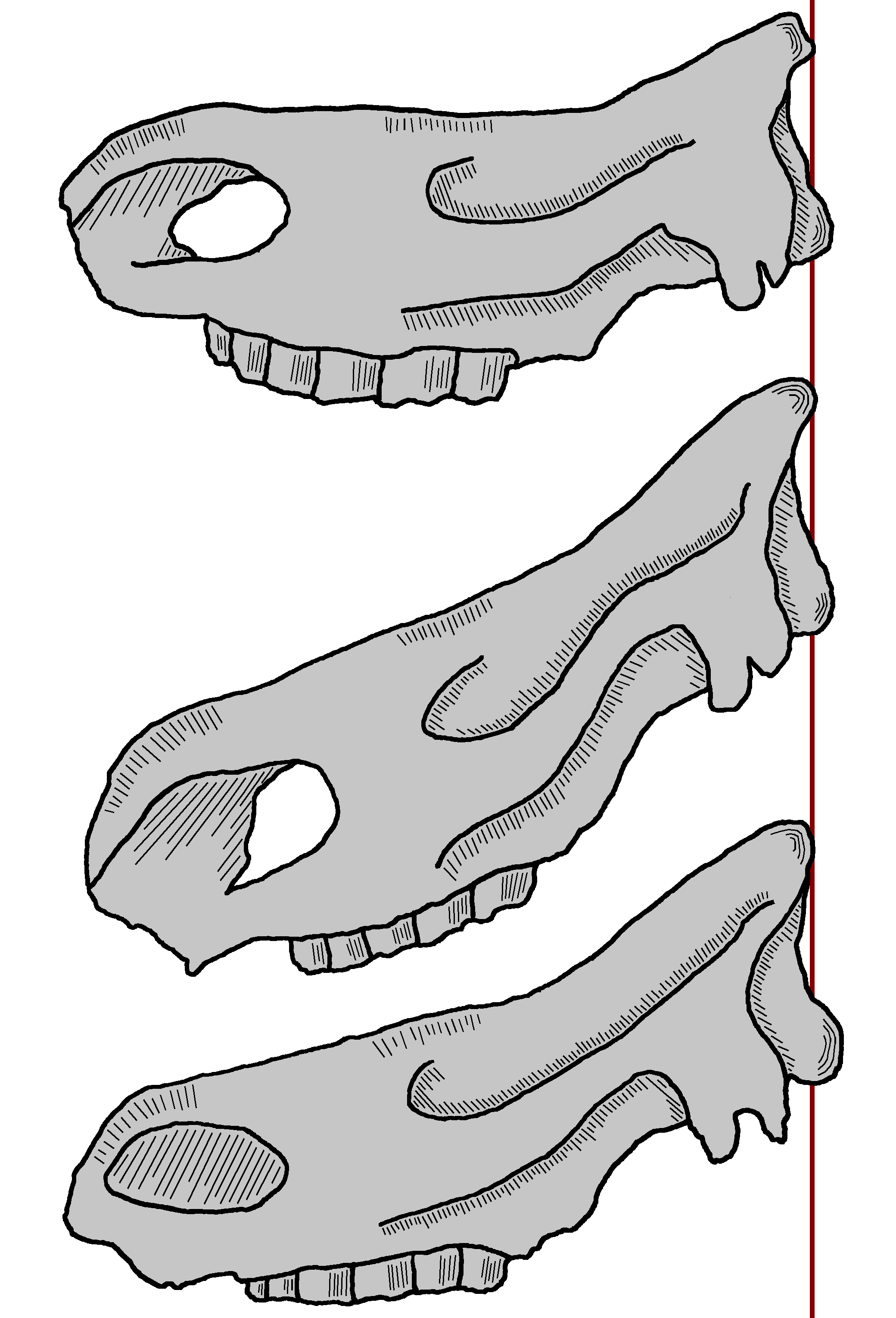
Skulls from top to bottom. Merck's rhinoceros S. kirchbergensis, the narrow-nosed rhinoceros S. hemitoechus and the woolly rhinoceros, showing the difference in head angle

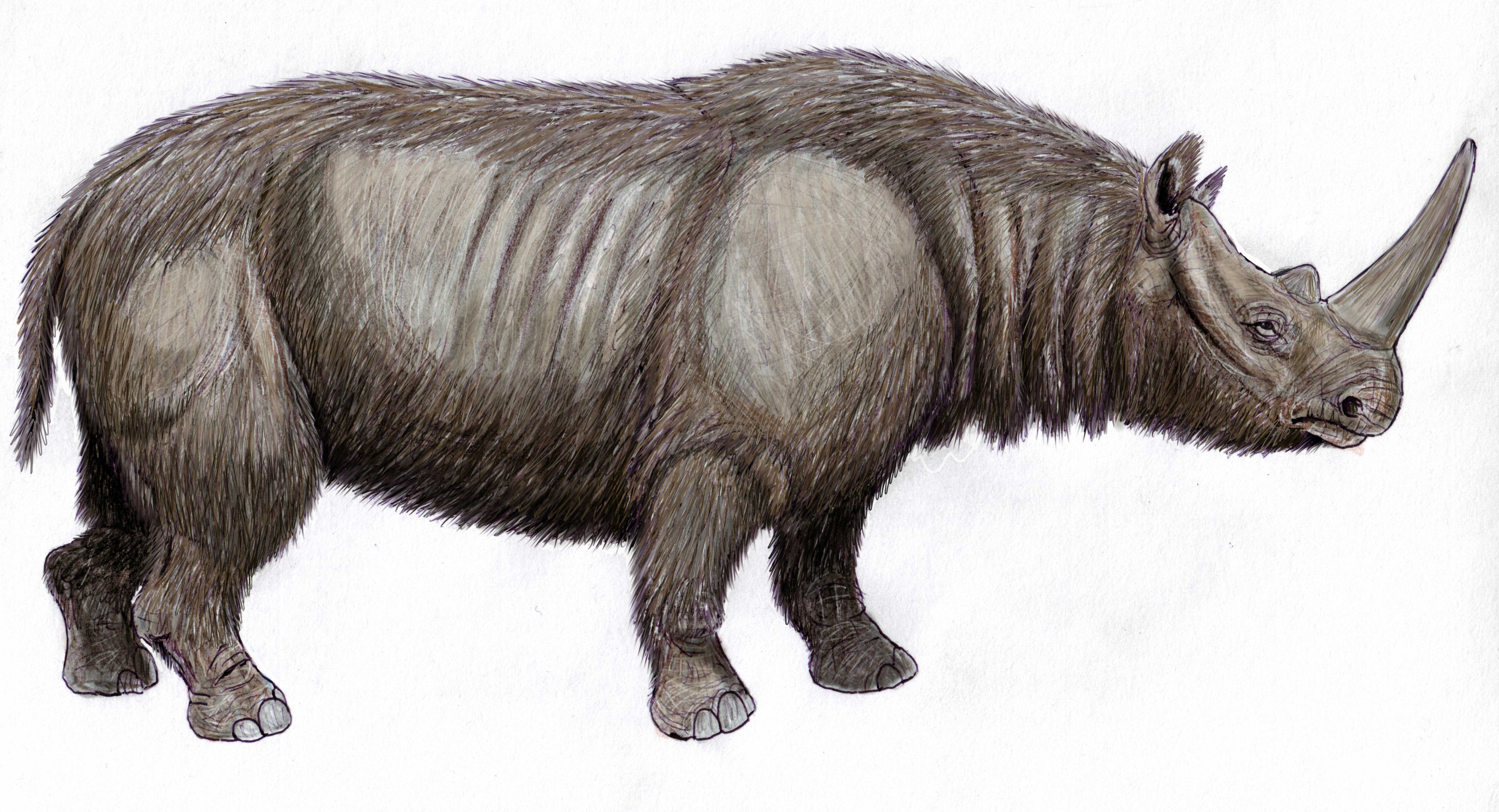
Drawing of Stephanorhinus hemitoechus

== Species and evolution ==
The oldest unambiguous known species of the genus are from the Pliocene of Europe. The former species "S." pikermiensis is currently considered to belong to Dihoplus. "S." megarhinus (known from the Late Miocene-Pliocene of Europe, Anatolia, and Transbaikalia, spanning from around 6.7-3.5 million years ago. ) and "S." miguelcrusafonti from the Early Pliocene of Western Europe were assigned to the new genus Pliorhinus in 2021, but their placement as a separate genus has been disputed, with other authors supporting their placement in Stephanorhinus.

The position of Stephanorhinus? africanus from the Middle Pliocene of Tunisia and Chad is uncertain.

Stephanorhinus jeanvireti, also known as S. elatus is known from the Late Pliocene and Early Pleistocene of Europe. Its remains are relatively rare in comparison to other Stephanorhinus species. Specimens are known from the Late Pliocene of Germany, France, Italy, Slovakia and Greece, and the Early Pleistocene of Romania, with its temporal span being around 3.4 to 2 million years ago (Ma).

Stephanorhinus etruscus first appears in the latest Pliocene in the Iberian Peninsula, around 3.3 Ma at Las Higueruelas in Spain and before 3 Ma at Piedrabuena, and during the latest Pliocene at Villafranca d'Asti and Castelnuovo di Berardenga in Italy and is abundant during most of the Villafranchian period in Europe, and is the sole rhinoceros species in Europe between 2.5 and around 1.3 Ma. A specimen is known from the Early Pleistocene (1.6-1.2 Ma) Ubeidiya locality in Israel. During the late Early Pleistocene, it is largely replaced by S. hundsheimensis. The last known records of the species are from the latest Early Pleistocene of the Iberian peninsula, around 0.9-0.8 Ma.

Remains of Stephanorhinus not assigned to species have been reported from the Dmanisi Paleolithic site in the Caucasus (Georgia), dating to around 1.8 Ma. The remains appear to belong to two morphotypes, which may represent distinct species. Some of these remains may be closely related to the later species Stephanorhinus hundsheimensis.

Stephanorhinus hundsheimensis first definitively appears in the fossil record in Europe and Anatolia at around 1.2 Ma, with possible records in Iberia around 1.6 Ma and 1.4-1.3 Ma. The earliest confirmed appearance in Italy around 1 Ma. Stephanorhinus hundsheimensis is typically suggested to have gone extinct at around 0.5 Ma, though a 2023 study suggested that the species may have persisted as recently as the latest Middle Pleistocene-earliest Late Pleistocene around 130,000 years ago, based on fossils found in Spain.

Stephanorhinus migrated from its origin in western Eurasia into eastern Eurasia during the Early Pleistocene, with remains of Stephanorhinus including those of S. etruscus being known from the Early Pleistocene of Kazakhstan and Tajikistan in Central Asia, with the earliest remains of the genus in China dating to around 1.6 Ma. Stephanorhinus yunchuchenensis is known from a single specimen in probably late Early Pleistocene aged deposits in Yushe, Shaanxi, China, while Stephanorhinus lantianensis is also known from a single specimen from late Early Pleistocene (1.15 Ma) deposits in Lantian, also in Shaanxi. These may be synonymous with other named Stephanorhinus species, with a 2022 study suggesting that they were likely synonyms of S. kirchbergensis and S. etruscus respectively.

The first definitive record of Stephanorhinus kirchbergensis (Merck's rhinoceros) is in China at Zhoukoudian (Choukoutien; near Beijing), around the Early–Mid-Pleistocene transition at 0.8 Ma.

Approximate time averaged range of Stephanorhinus kirchbergensis (red) and Stephanorhinus hemitoechus (blue), with overlapping range in purple.

S. kirchbergensis appeared in Europe between 0.7-6 Ma with S. hemitoechus (the narrow-nosed rhinoceros) first appearing in Europe around 0.6-0.5 Ma. S. kirchbergensis was broadly distributed over northern Eurasia from Western Europe to East Asia, while S. hemitoechus was generally confined to the western Palearctic, including Europe, West Asia, and North Africa.

In Europe, the timing of the extinction of S. kirchbergensis is uncertain, though it is sometime after 115,000 years ago. The latest records of S. hemitoechus in Europe are known from the Iberian Peninsula, where they survived until at least 34,000 years ago, with the species possibly surviving as late as 15,500 years ago in the Levant. In the Altai region, S. kirchbergensis survived until at least 40,000 years ago. In South China, the species may have survived into Marine Isotope Stage 2 (~29-14,000 years ago).

== Ecology and behaviour ==
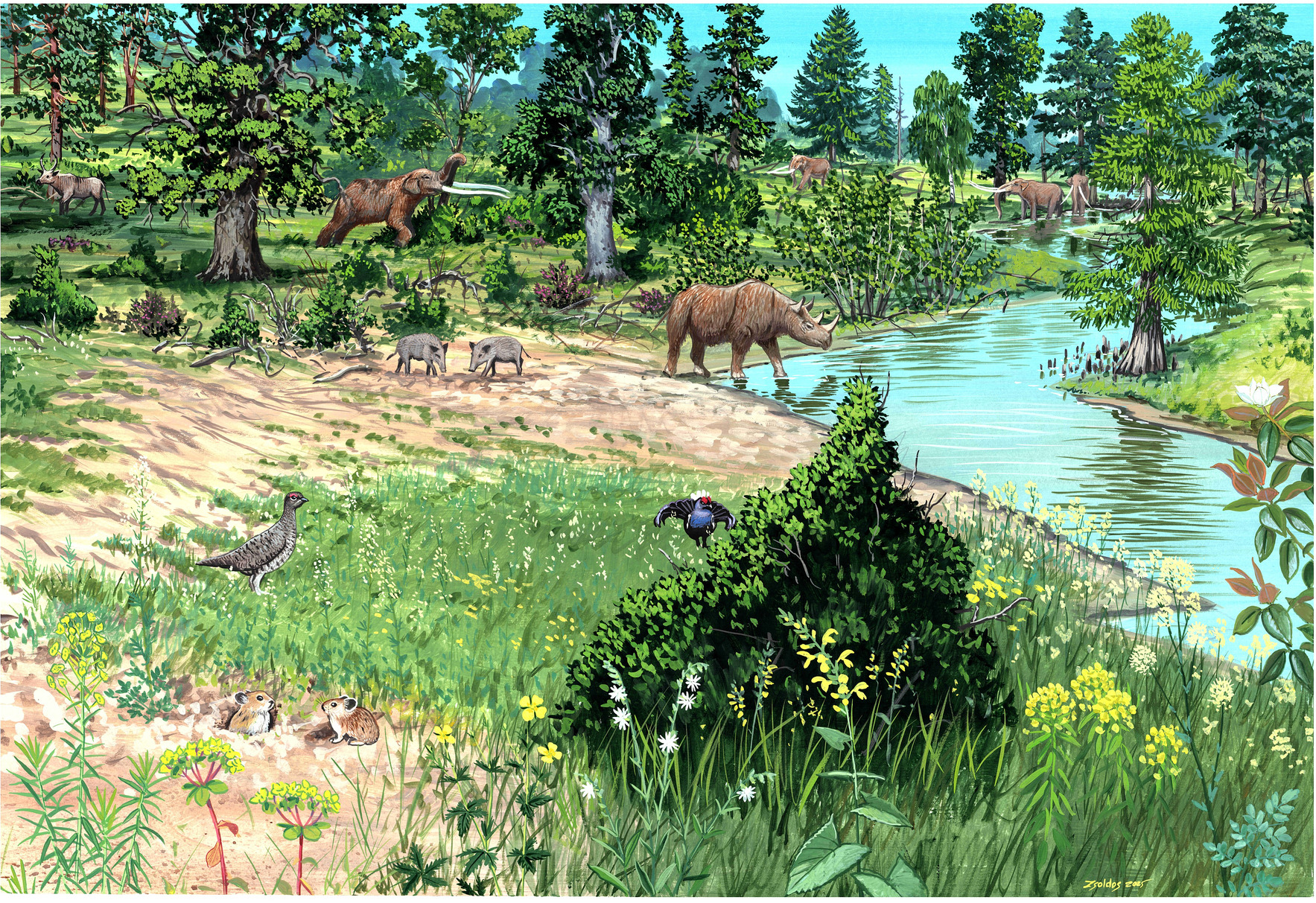
A Pliocene temperate forested Central European landscape featuring Stephanorhinus etruscus (midground centre) alongside the proboscideans (elephant relatives) Anancus arvernensis and "Mammut" borsoni, the pig Sus minor, the bovine Leptobos stenometopon, pikas, ptarmigans and grouse.

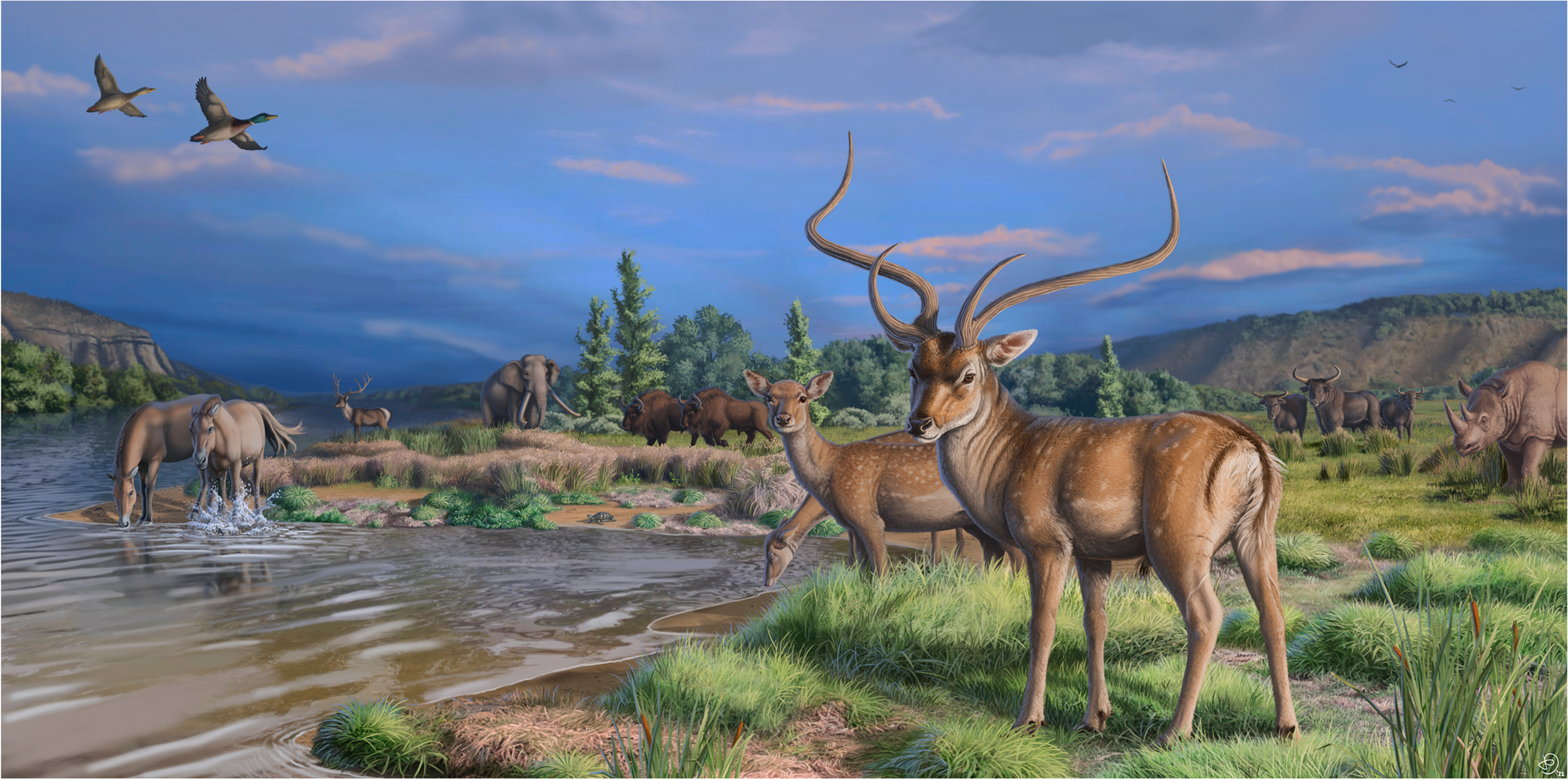
A Middle Pleistocene landscape in Spain, including the narrow-nosed rhinoceros (Stephanorhinus hemitoechus, far right), as well as straight-tusked elephant (background centre-left), the extinct fallow deer Dama celiae (foreground) wild horse (left), bison, (background centre) aurochs (background right), , an Iberian pond turtle and two mallards (left upper corner).

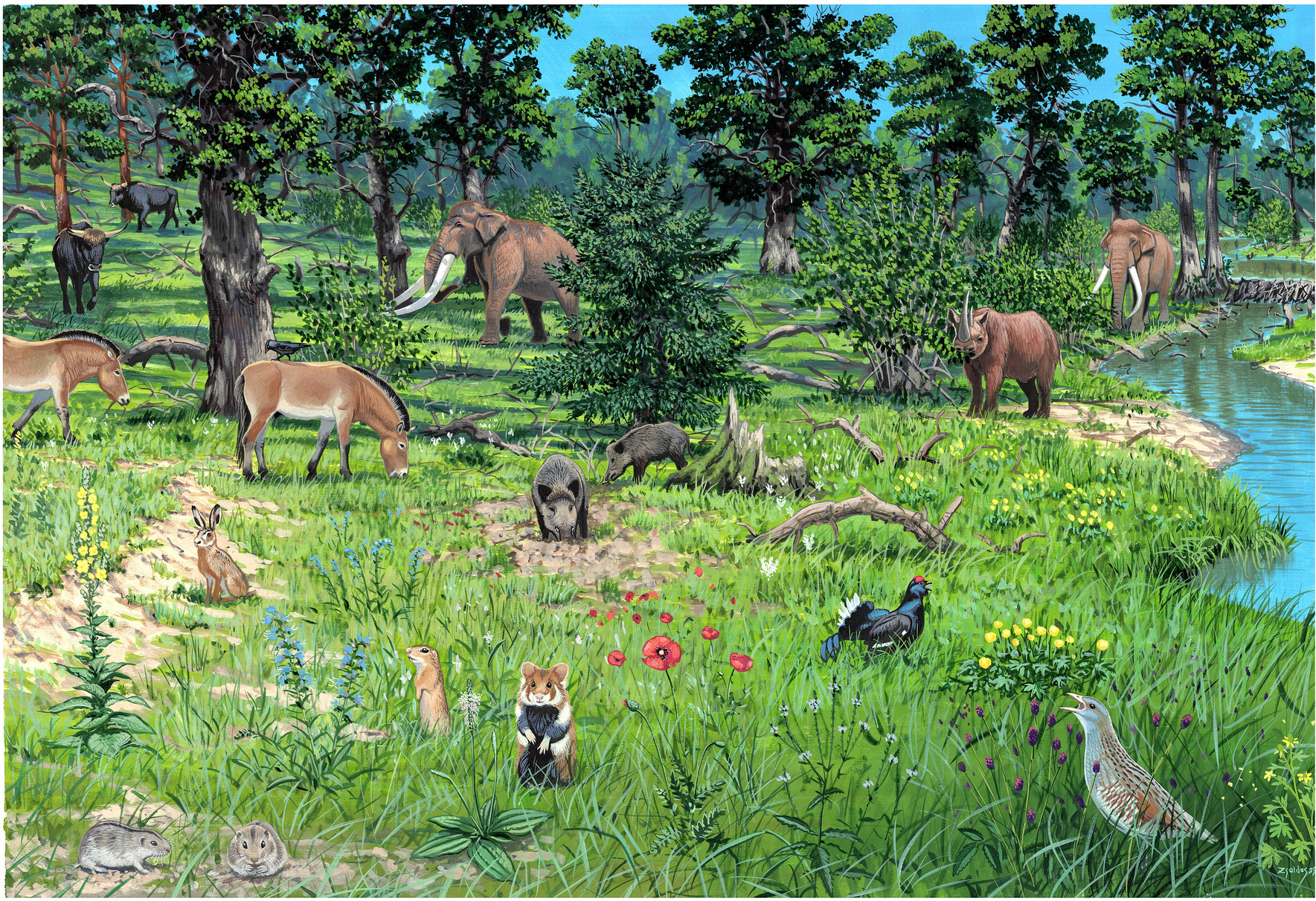
Landscape of Central Europe during the Last Interglacial (~130-115,000 years ago), featuring Merck's rhinoceros (Stephanorhinus kirchbergensis, background right), as well as other large animals like straight-tusked elephants, wild boar, wild horse and aurochs. Other featured animals include western jackdaw, corn crake, black grouse, steppe lemming, the extinct ground squirrel Spermophilus citelloides, European hare and European hamster

Stephanorhinus etruscus is thought to have had a browsing based diet. The diet of S. hundsheimensis was flexible, with two different early Middle Pleistocene populations under different climatic regimes having tooth wear analyses suggesting contrasting browsing and grazing habits. S. kirchbergensis and S. hemitoechus are typically interpreted mixed feeders tending towards browsing and grazing, respectively. The evolution of more specialized diets is possibly due to the change to the 100 Kyr cycle after the Mid-Pleistocene Transition, which resulted in environmental stability allowing the development of more specialized forms. Stephanorhinus species likely had similar social behaviour to living rhinoceroses, with the size of the home ranges and the territoriality of males possibly varying between Stephanorhinus species. Species of Stephanorhinus may have also seasonally migrated between different feeding grounds. Males of Stephanorhinus species likely engaged in confrontations against other males over females, which may have been ritualized, or in some species sometimes broken out into full-blown direct combat. Injuries found in some S. hemitoechus and S. kirchbergensis individuals may be evidence of such fighting.

== Relationship with humans ==
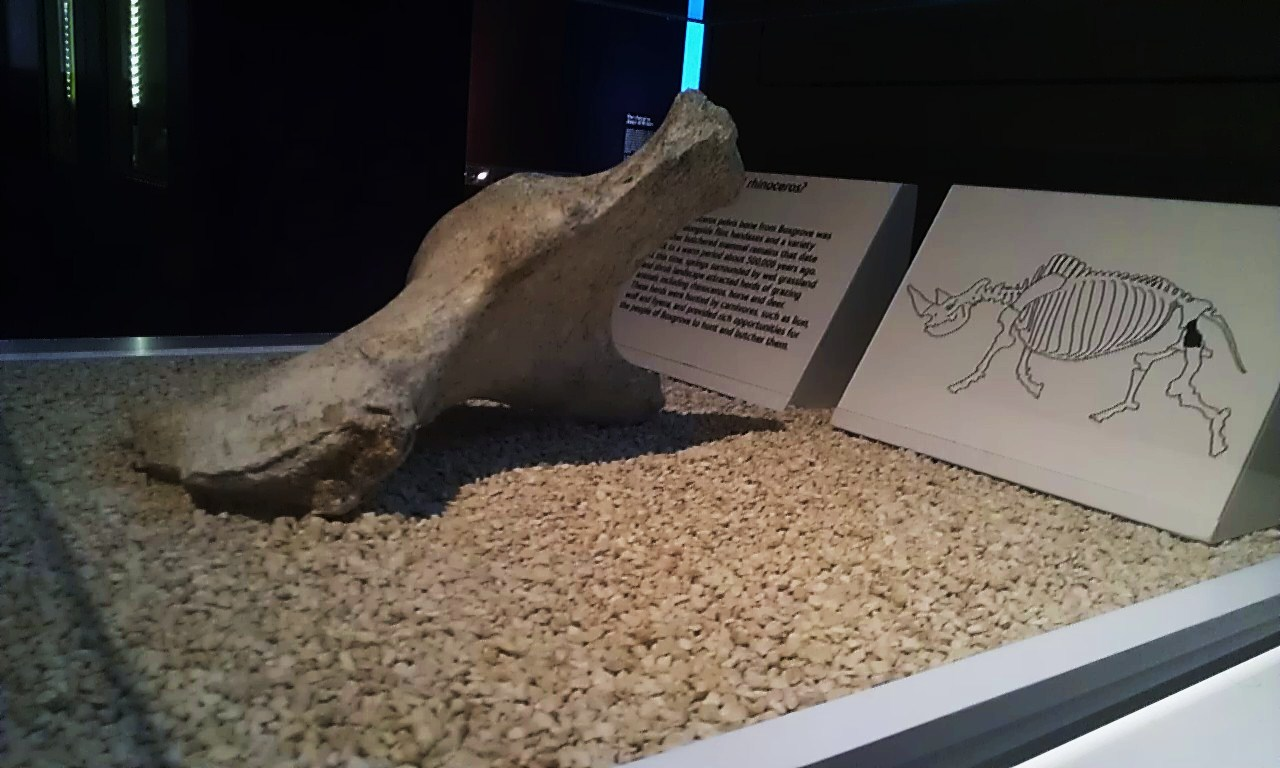
A butchered hip bone of Stephanorhinus cf. hundsheimensis found at the Boxgrove site, England, dating to around 480,000 years ago

Remains of Stephanorhinus species have been found in sites across Europe with break or cut marks indicating that they were butchered by archaic humans. The earliest such site is Vallonnet Cave in France dating to around 1.2 to 1.1 million years ago, where remains of S. hundsheimensis have been reported with cut marks. Another early site is the Boxgrove locality in England, dating to around 500,000 years ago, where an indeterminate species of Stephanorhinus, probably S. hundsheimensis, was found with cut marks thought to have been created by "Boxgrove Man", possibly Homo heidelbergensis. The youngest sites are known from the late Middle Paleolithic (around 130–40,000 years ago), indicating the butchering of the narrow-nosed and Merck's rhinoceros by Neanderthals. At some sites hunting is suggested to be the more likely than scavenging based on mortality profiles. Neanderthals likely used Stephanorhinus teeth as tools for stoneworking.

An astragalus attributed to Stephanorhinus was discovered in the Southwest Quarter of Mycenae, along with a collection of other artifacts. Its placement there was dated to the thirteenth century B.C.E, long after the extinction of Stephanorhinus. This is suggested to represent one of the earliest examples of fossil collecting.
