= Balkan snow vole =

Balkan snow vole Temporal range: Early Pleistocene to Recent

Conservation status
- Vulnerable (IUCN 3.1)

Scientific classification
- Kingdom: Animalia
- Phylum: Chordata
- Class: Mammalia
- Order: Rodentia
- Family: Cricetidae
- Subfamily: Arvicolinae
- Tribe: Pliomyini
- Genus: Dinaromys; Kretzoi, 1955
- Species: D. bogdanovi

Binomial name
- Dinaromys bogdanovi (V. E. Martino & E. V. Martino, 1922)

Subspecies
- D. b. bogdanovi D. b. coeruleus D. b. grebenscikovi D. b. korabensis D. b. longipedis D. b. marakovici D. b. preniensis D. b. trebevicensis
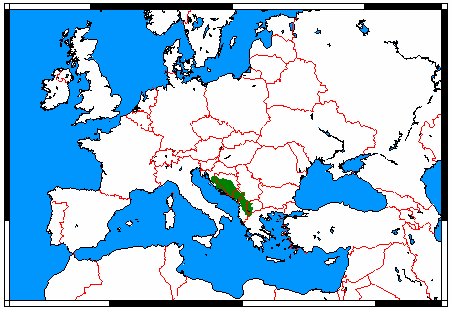
- Balkan snow vole range

Species of rodent

The Balkan snow vole (Dinaromys bogdanovi), also known as Martino's snow vole, is the only living member of the genus Dinaromys. The genus name means "Dinaric mouse", referring to the Dinaric Alps, as the species is endemic to the western Balkans of southeast Europe. Eight subspecies of this vole have been recognized, although in 2022 this number was reduced to two subspecies. The Balkan snow vole is a living fossil, the only living species in the tribe Pliomyini, and might arguably better be placed in Pliomys, a genus established for its fossil relatives even before the Balkan snow vole was scientifically described. It was described by husband and wife mammalogists Vladimir Emmanuilovich Martino and Evgeniya Veniaminovna Martino. Others have argued that Pliomys (whose last representative, P. lenki, only became extinct around 12,000 years ago) should be treated as entirely separate from Dinaromys, with Dinaromys and P. lenki estimated to have genetically diverged around 4 million years ago based on ancient DNA sequences. The earliest representatives of Dinaromys like D. allegranzii date to the Early Pleistocene (around 2.5-2 million years ago), with Dinaromys also inhabiting the Italian Peninsula until the end of the Late Pleistocene, when it contracted to its current distribution.

A 2021 study found Dinaromys (and by extension, the rest of Pliomyini) to be the sister group to the tribe Ellobiusini, from which it diverged during the late Miocene; however, this still remains uncertain.

The subspecies D. d. longipedis was recognized as a distinct species by the American Society of Mammalogists as D. longipedis; it is found in the northwestern part of this species's range.

The IUCN lists it as a vulnerable species due to its small and fragmented habitat, and competition with the European snow vole.
