= Franz Toula =

Austrian geologist

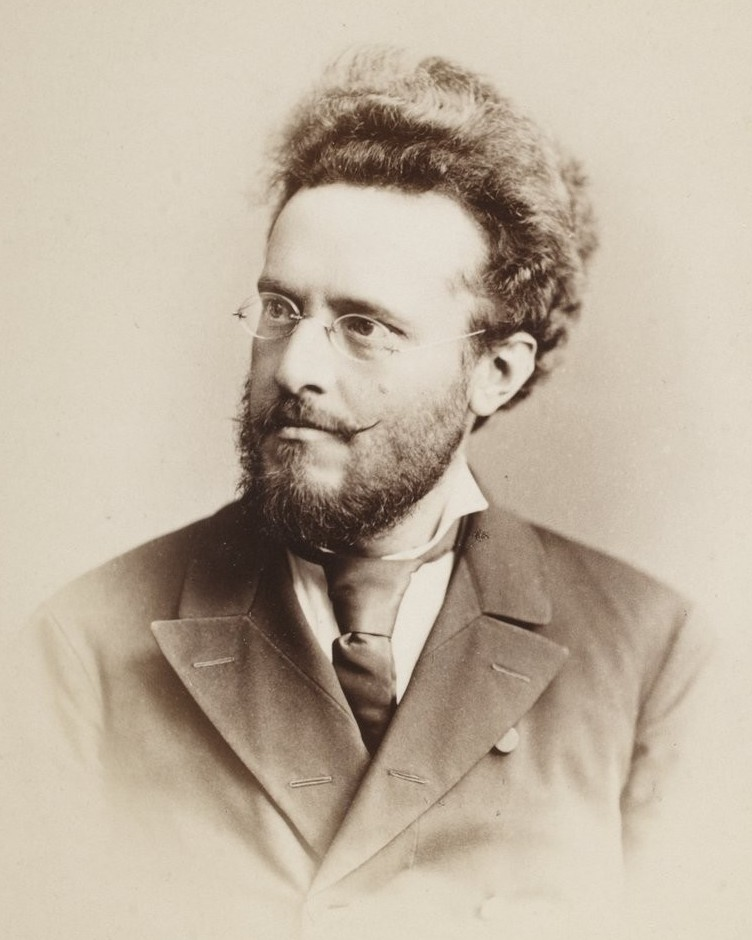
- Born: 20 December 1845; Vienna, Austrian Empire
- Died: 30 January 1920 (aged 74); Vienna, Republic of Austria
- Education: Polytechnic Institute in Vienna
- Occupations: geologist; mineralogist; paleontologist
- Scientific career
- Workplaces: Polytechnic Institute in Vienna

Franz Toula (20 December 1845 in Vienna – 3 January 1920 in Vienna) was an Austrian geologist, mineralogist and paleontologist.

== Biography ==
Beginning in 1863 he studied at the Polytechnic Institute in Vienna (later on, known as Technische Hochschule Wien), where he was a pupil and assistant to Ferdinand von Hochstetter. Later on, he worked for several years as a gymnasium instructor in Vienna. In 1880 he became an associate professor at the Technische Hochschule, where from 1884 to 1917 he served as a full professor of mineralogy and geology. In 1893/94 he served as academic rector. He was co-founder of the Naturwissenschaftlichen Orientverein.

From the 1870s onward, he performed geological investigations in the Balkans, about which, he was the author of numerous publications. Later on, he expanded his research to include the Ottoman Empire and Crimea. He also conducted significant stratigraphic-paleontological studies in the vicinity of Vienna.

== Selected works ==
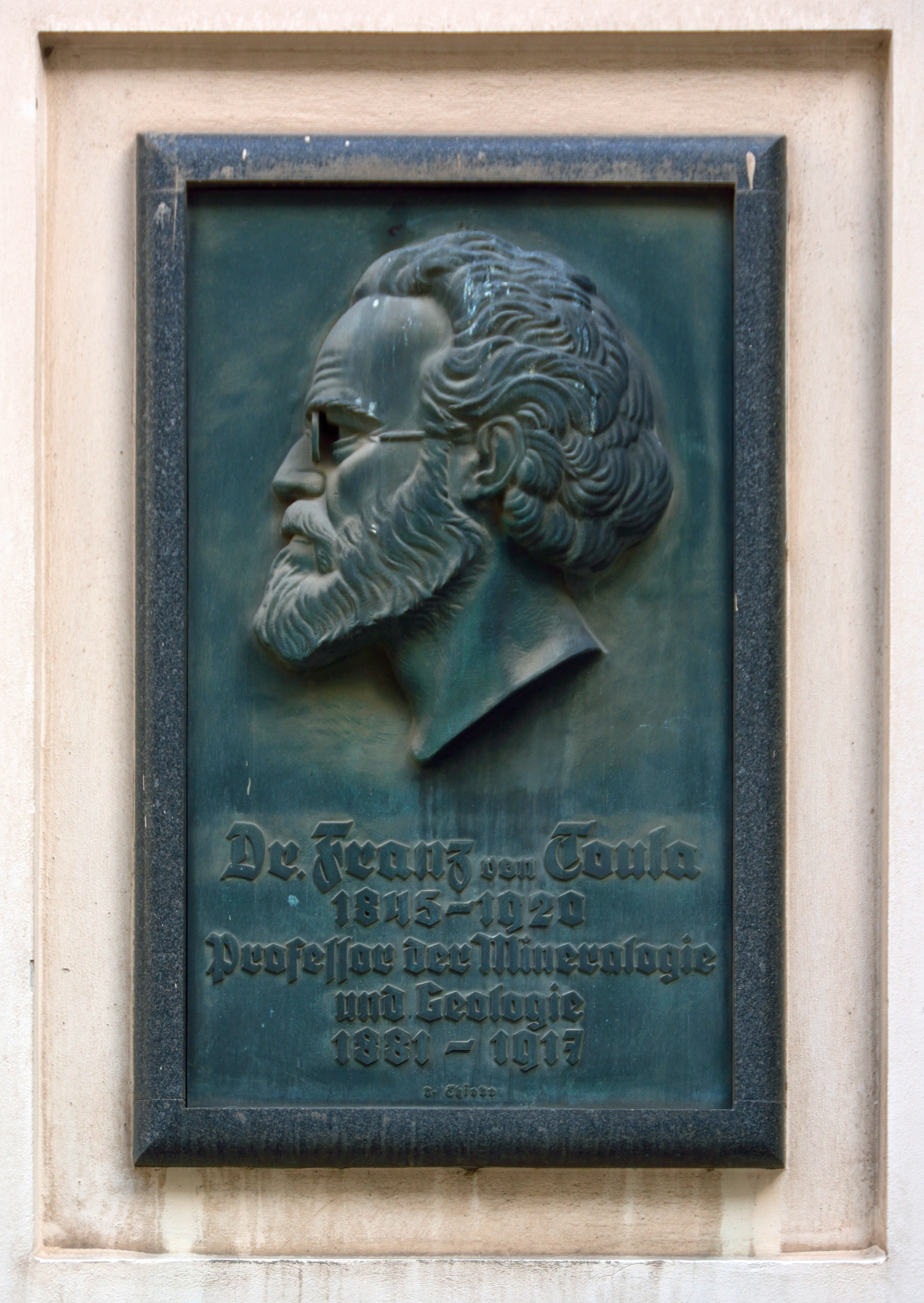
Plaque to Franz Toula in the courtyard of the Vienna University of Technology.

- Eine geologische Reise in den westlichen Balkan und in die benachbarten Gebiete. Wien: Alfred Hölder. 1876. – A geological journey in the western Balkans and neighboring regions.
- Mineralogische und petrographische Tabellen, 1886 – Mineralogical and petrographical tables.
- Die Steinkohlen, ihre Eigenschaften, Vorkommen, Entstehung und nationalökonomische Bedeutung, 1888 – Coal, its properties, occurrences, development and national economic significance.
- Geologische Untersuchungen im centralen Balkan, 1889 – Geological investigations of the central Balkans.
- "Geologische Untersuchungen im östlichen Balkan und in den angrenzenden Gebieten". Denkschriften der Kaiserlichen Akademie der Wissenschaften, Mathematisch-Naturwissenschaftliche Classe (57). Wien: 323–400. 1890 – via Internet Archive.
- Reisen und geologische Untersuchungen in Bulgarien, 1890 – Travels and geological investigations in Bulgaria.
- Lehrbuch der Geologie : ein Leitfaden für Studierende, 1900 – Textbook of geology; a guide for students.
- Das Nashorn von Hundsheim, 1902 – The rhino of Hundsheim.
- Paläontologische Mitteilungen aus den Sammlungen von Kronstadt in Siebenbürgen, 1911 – Paleontological releases from the collections of Kronstadt in Transylvania.
