= Pliomys =

Pliomys Temporal range: Early Pleistocene–Late Pleistocene

Scientific classification
- Kingdom: Animalia
- Phylum: Chordata
- Class: Mammalia
- Order: Rodentia
- Family: Cricetidae
- Genus: †Pliomys; Méhely 1914

Species
- †Pliomys simplicior; †Pliomys episcopalis; †Pliomys lenki; †Pliomys coronensis?; †Pliomys hungaricus? Kormos 1934

Extinct genus of rodents

Pliomys is an extinct genus of voles that inhabited Europe during the Pleistocene epoch.

== Distribution ==
The genus is known from fossils found across Europe. The earliest fossils date to the first half of the Early Pleistocene (or possibly Late Pliocene) assigned to the species P. simplictor. One species, P. lenki (which is possibly synonymous with Pliomys coronensis), surviving to the end of the Late Pleistocene, until around 12,000 years ago in southern France and the Iberian Peninsula.

== Taxonomy ==
Pliomys belongs to the tribe Pliomyini of the subfamily Arvicolinae. Morphological evidence and DNA sequences obtained from P. lenki suggests that its closest living relative is the genus Dinaromys with a single species native to the Balkans, with P. lenki estimated to have diverged from Dinaromys around 4 million years ago. Both genera are suggested to have originated from the fossil genus Propliomys.

== Description ==
P. episcopalis and P. coronensis can be distinguished based on the morphology of their anteroconids. In P. episcopalis, T7 is typically not present or only somewhat developed, while the anterior cap is largely confluent with T6 and T7 when it is present. P. coronensis, on the other hand, has a distinctive T7. It also has well developed LRA5 and BRA4 angles, which combined with the distinctive T7 produces a clearer separation of T6 and T7 from the anterior cap.

== Palaeobiology ==
=== Palaeoecology ===
P. lenki was generally associated with cold and temperate conditions showing a range of climatic tolerance, though it appears to have only lived in open habitats and was intolerant of forest, with many specimens also found in hilly or mountainous environments.
