= Mark Roberts (archaeologist) =

English archaeologist (born 1961)

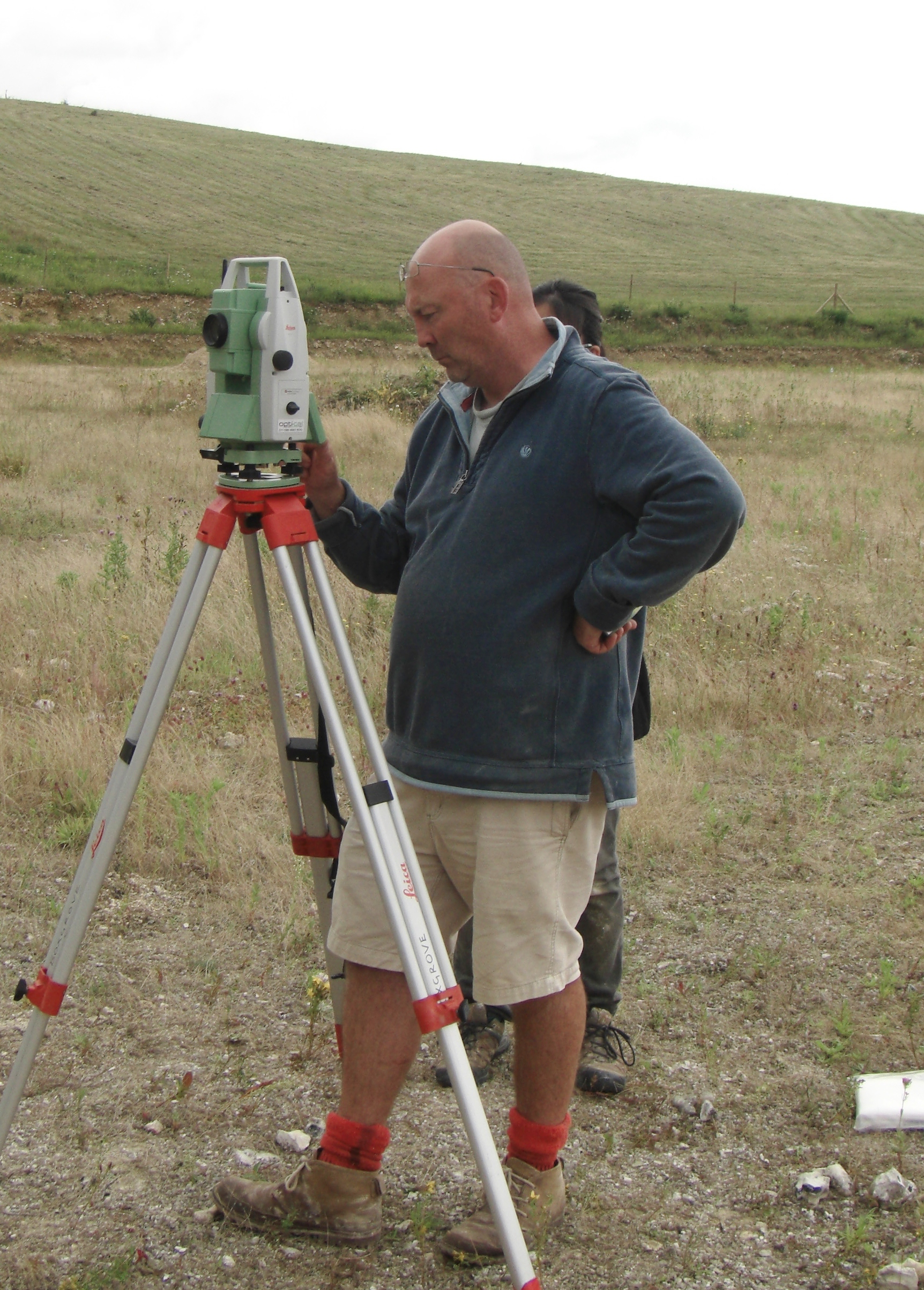
- Roberts using a total station theodolite at Boxgrove in West Sussex in 2011.
- Born: Mark Brian Roberts; 20 May 1961 (age 64); Chichester, West Sussex, England
- Occupation(s): Archaeologist, Prehistorian
- Known for: Boxgrove Quarry

Mark Brian Roberts (born 20 May 1961) is an English archaeologist specialising in the study of the Palaeolithic. He is best known for his discovery of, and subsequent excavations at, the Lower Palaeolithic site of Boxgrove Quarry in southern England. Roberts was a principal research fellow at the UCL Institute of Archaeology. He has twice been awarded the Stopes Medal for his contribution to the study of Palaeolithic humans and Pleistocene geology, and in 2021 was made an Honorary Fellow of West Dean College of Arts and Conservation.

Born in Chichester, West Sussex, Roberts developed an interest in geology and archaeology at an early age, working at a series of local excavations before studying at the then-independent Institute of Archaeology in Bloomsbury, London (1980–83). His Boxgrove excavations, which ran from 1983 to 1996, revealed the best preserved Middle Palaeolithic site then known to archaeologists. In 1993, the project unearthed remains belonging to a Homo heidelbergensis, the earliest known hominin in Europe at that time. The results of these excavations were published in numerous articles and two English Heritage-funded monographs (1999 and 2020), and Roberts' experience of the excavations explored in the innovative archaeological (auto)biography Fairweather Eden (1998), co-written with fellow Sussex archaeologist Mike Pitts.

Other work by Roberts includes several excavations on the West Sussex downs, notably at Goosehill Camp on Bow Hill, an Iron Age enclosure previously excavated by the Sussex antiquary J.R. Boyden, and Downley, the location of Iron Age and Roman settlements and a Tudor hunting lodge. Both these latter projects were UCL Institute of Archaeology training excavations.

== Bibliography ==
=== Books ===
- Pitts, Mike; Roberts, Mark. (1997). Fairweather Eden: Life in Britain half a million years ago as revealed by the excavations at Boxgrove. London: Century.
- Roberts, Mark; Parfitt, Simon. (1999). Boxgrove: A Middle Pleistocene Hominid Site at Eartham Quarry, Boxgrove, West Sussex. London: English Heritage Archaeological Report 17.
- Roberts, Mark; Pope, Matt (2018). The Boxgrove Wider Area Project: Mapping the early Middle Pleistocene deposits of the Slindon Formation across the coastal plain of West Sussex and eastern Hampshire. Portslade: Spoilheap Publications.
- Pope, Matt; Parfitt, Simon.; Roberts, Mark (2020). The Horse Butchery Site: A High Resolution Record of Lower Palaeolithic Hominin Behaviour at Boxgrove, UK. Woking: Spoilheap Publications

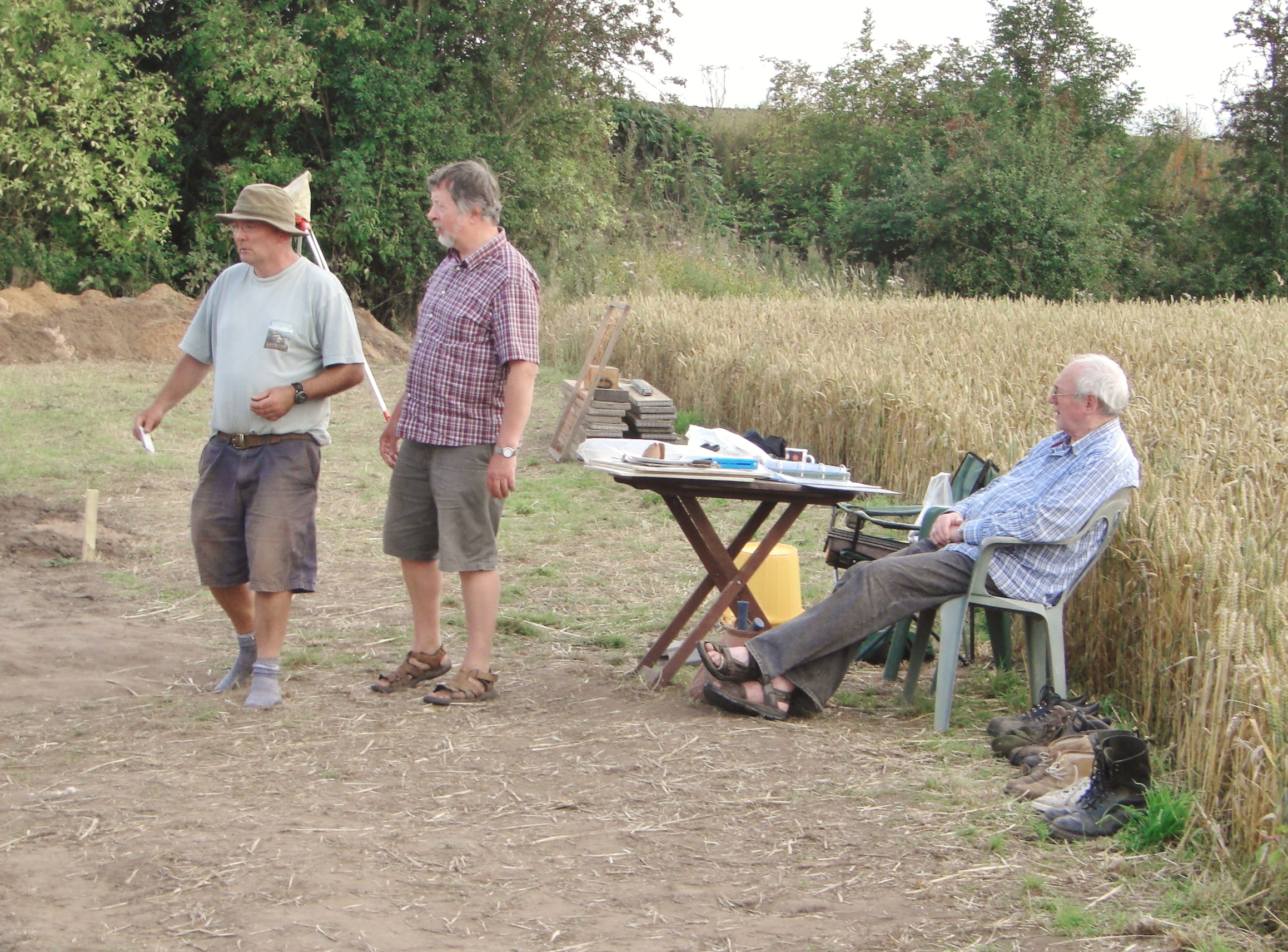
Mark Roberts with fellow archaeologist Richard Morris (centre) and novelist Alan Garner (right) at Blackden, Cheshire, in 2011.

=== Articles and reports ===
- Roberts, Mark (1996). "Man the Hunter returns at Boxgrove". British Archaeology, 18, pp. 8–9.
- Pope, Matt; Roberts, Matt (2005). "Observations on the relationship between Paleolithic individuals and artefact scatters at the Middle Pleistocene site of Boxgrove, UK". In Gamble, Clive; Porr, Martin (eds) The Hominid Individual in Context: Archaeological Investigations of Lower and Middle Palaeolithic Landscapes, Locales and Artefacts, pp. 81–97. London: Routledge.
- Roberts, Mark; Pope, Matt (2009). "The archaeological and sedimentary records from Boxgrove and Slindon". In Briant, Rebecca; Bates, Martin; Hosfield, Rob; Wenban-Smith, Francis (eds)The Quaternary of the Solent Basin and the Sussex Raised Beaches, pp. 96–122. London: Quaternary Research Association.
- Roberts, Mark (2009). "Where now for Boxgrove?". Archaeology International. 11: 28–33.
- Roberts, Mark (2009). "Goosehill Camp Investigation". Past Matters. 7: 19–23.
- Pope, Matt; Roberts, Mark (2009). "'Clenching Authority': Joseph Prestwich and the proofs of the Antiquity of Man". Lithics 30, pp. 35–44.
- Pope, Matt; Roberts, Mark; Maxted, Andrew; Jones, Pat (2009). "The Valdoe: archaeology of a locality within the Boxgrove paleolandscape". Proceedings of the Prehistoric Society, 75, pp. 239–263.
- Hillson, Simon; Parfitt, Simon; Bello, Silvia; Roberts, Mark; Stringer, Christopher (2010). "Two hominin incisor teeth from the Middle Pleistocene site of Boxgrove, Sussex, England". Journal of Human Evolution. 59 (5): 493–503. doi:10.1016/j.jhevol.2010.06.004. PMID 20828787.
- Holmes, J.A.; Atkinson, T.; Fiona Darbyshire, D.P.; Horne, D.J.; Joordans, J.; Roberts, M.B.; Sinka, K.J.; Whittaker, J.E. (2010). "Middle Pleistocene climate and hydrological environments at the Boxgrove hominin site (West Sussex, UK) from ostracod records" (PDF). Quaternary Science Reviews. 29 (13–14): 1515–1527. Bibcode:2010QSRv...29.1515H. doi:10.1016/j.quascirev.2009.02.024.
- Stout, Dietrich; Apel, Jan; Commander, Julia; Roberts, Mark (2014). "Late Acheulian technology and cognition at Boxgrove, UK". Journal of Archaeological Science, pp. 576–590.
- Roberts, Mark (2018) "The Institute of Archaeology Field Course at Downley Park, Singleton, West Sussex, UK. Multi period excavations around the hunting lodge of the Earls of Arundel". Archaeology International, 21, pp. 141–152.
