= Baker's Hole =

Protected area in Kent, England

Coordinates: 51.444°N 0.317°E

- Site of Special Scientific Interest
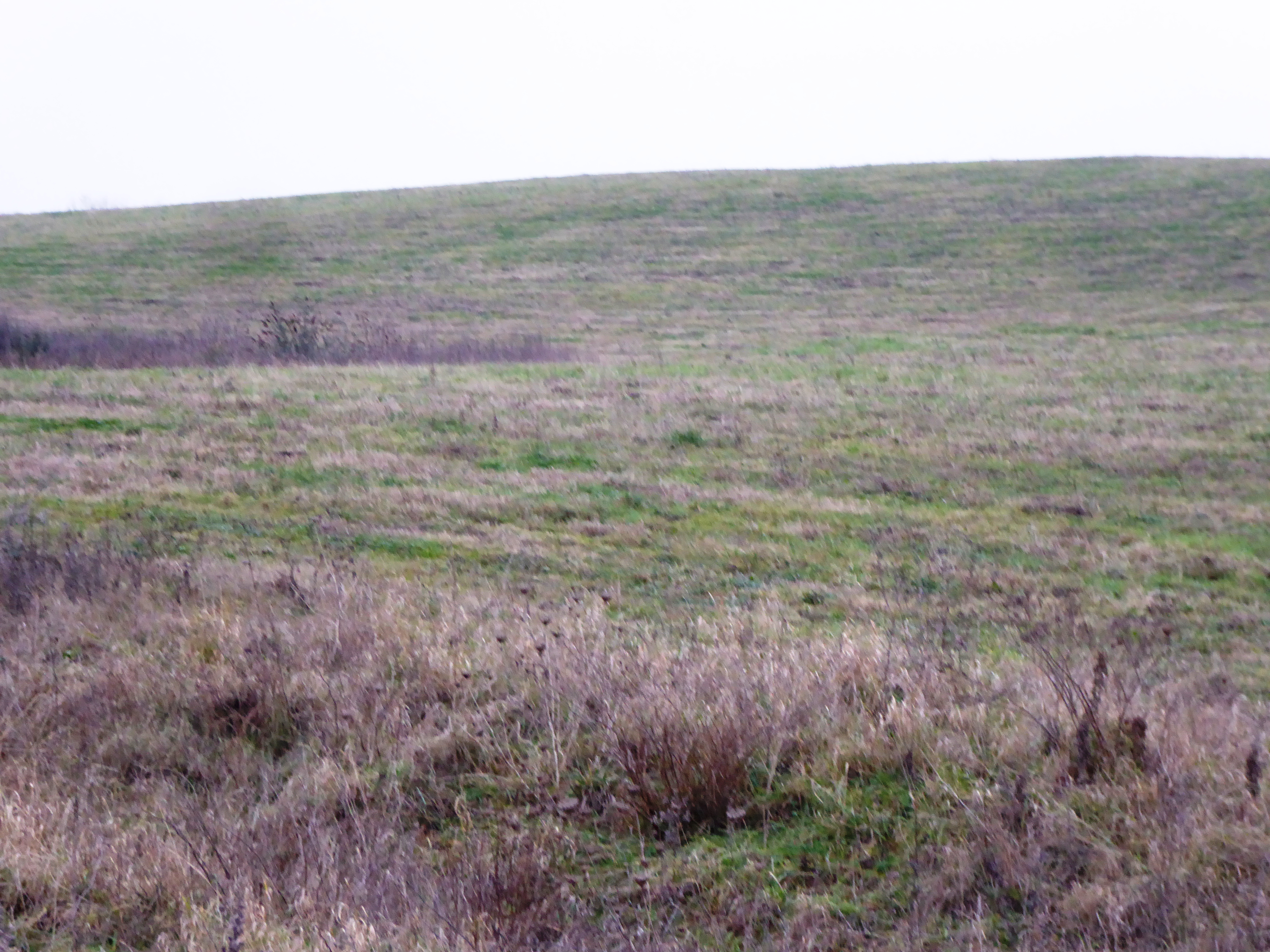
- Location of Baker's Hole.
- Area of search: Kent
- Grid reference: TQ 611 742
- Interest: Geological
- Area: 6.9 hectares (17 acres)
- Notification date: 1989
- Location map: Magic Map

Baker's Hole is a 6.9 hectares (17 acres) geological Site of Special Scientific Interest, mostly consisting of a back-filled quarry, adjacent to Ebbsfleet International railway station in Kent. It is a Geological Conservation Review site. It is a nationally significant site for finds during quarrying of Stone Age tools, which are now dispersed among many museums.

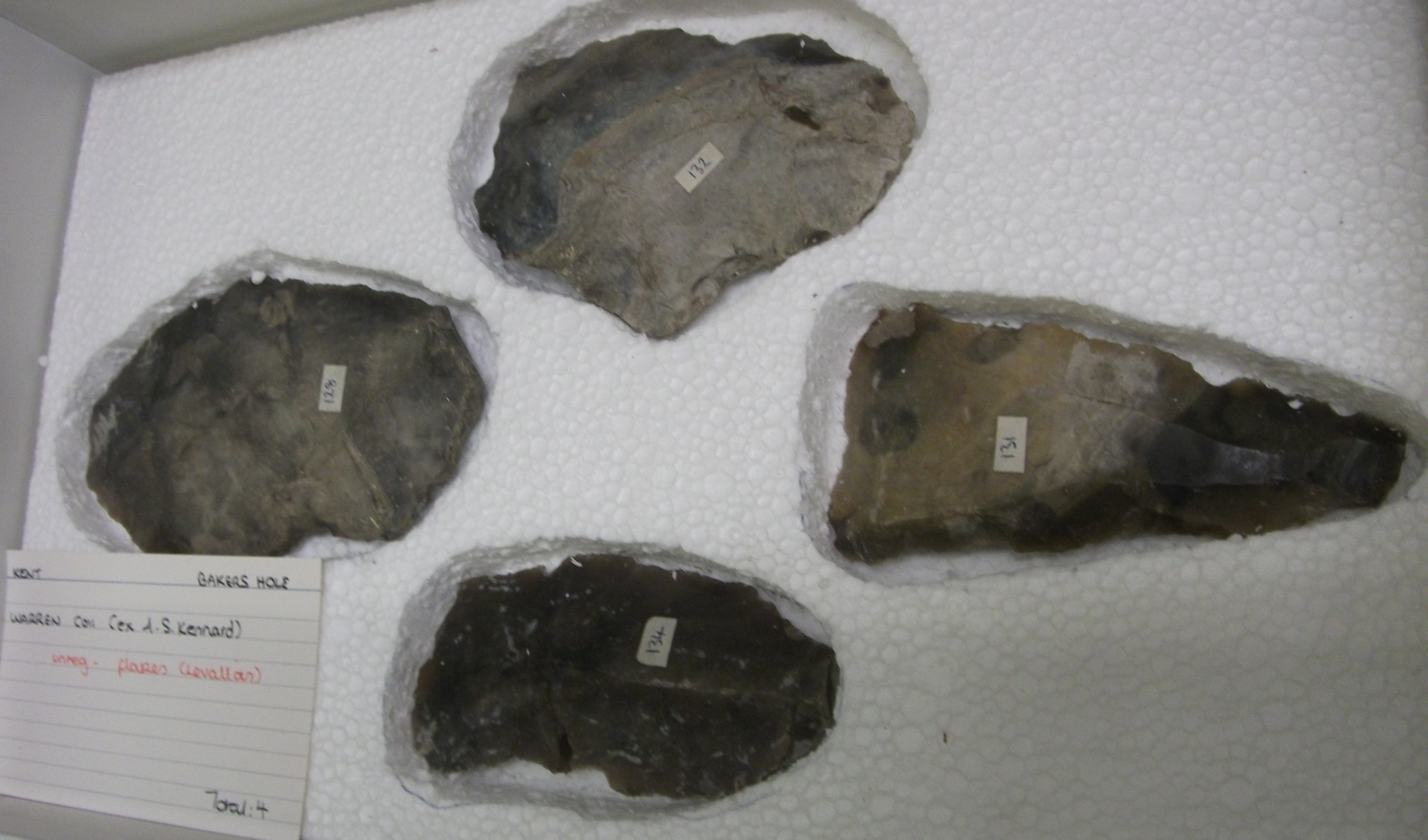
Levallois flakes from Baker's Hole at the British Museum (not on display)

== Location ==
Baker's Hole is in the Ebbsfleet valley south of the river Thames in Kent, an area rich in significant Paleolithic sites, including Swanscombe Heritage Park just to the west, and Swanscombe Thameside Community School ("Swan Valley School" in some sources) across Southfleet Road. Baker's Hole is traditionally described as in Northfleet, Gravesham but is now described as in the parish of "Swanscombe and Greenhithe" by Kent County Council. For the main periods of archaeological finds, the site was quarried by the Associated Portland Cement Manufacturers Ltd – the Swanscombe/Northfleet area was where William Aspdin had pioneered Portland cement in the 1840s. Quarrying is now finished and most of the site has been back-filled. Locating the precise findspots for the material described as coming from Baker's Hole is somewhat complicated, and the area from which they came is more precisely described as "Southfleet Pit" within the larger quarry; "Baker's Hole" proper is to the north, and has produced no finds.

== Archaeological investigations ==
The site has been described as "the best known British Early Middle Paleolithic (MIS 9-7) site". It produced "mostly large Levallois cores and flakes", representing the discarded remains of production on a considerable scale of stone hand axe tools by a population probably consisting of Neanderthals. It is described by the Kent County Council archaeological service as a "Mousterian factory", with a sequence through the Clactonian, Acheulian and Mousterian archaeological industries. Many of the finds are now in the British Museum, which in the past distributed small sets of artefacts to several other museums.

The first finds from the Ebbsfleet valley were made in 1881 in a tramway cutting, and a local amateur archaeologist, James Cross, began collecting finds from Southfleet Pit from soon after quarrying began in 1909. Finds were published by R.A. Smith, an archaeologist from the British Museum, in 1911, although it appears that he never excavated at the site himself, but inspected, borrowed, and later published finds produced for him by the company, which they had paid the quarry workers to hand in as they came across them in their work. These were finally transferred to the British Museum in 1914 and then numbered some 750 pieces. The British Museum subsequently distributed small collections of "duplicate" material to any local museum that asked for one, and now holds 299 pieces from the "Smith Collection".

The implications of this history are that, according to Rebecca Scott of the British Museum, it cannot safely be assumed that the many hand axes found on the site are from the same levels as the cores and flakes, as has often been claimed in the past.

== Access ==
The site is private land with no public access.

== See also ==
- Swanscombe Peninsula SSSI
- Swanscombe Palaeolithic site SSSI
