= Clacton Spear =

Prehistoric wooden spear tip

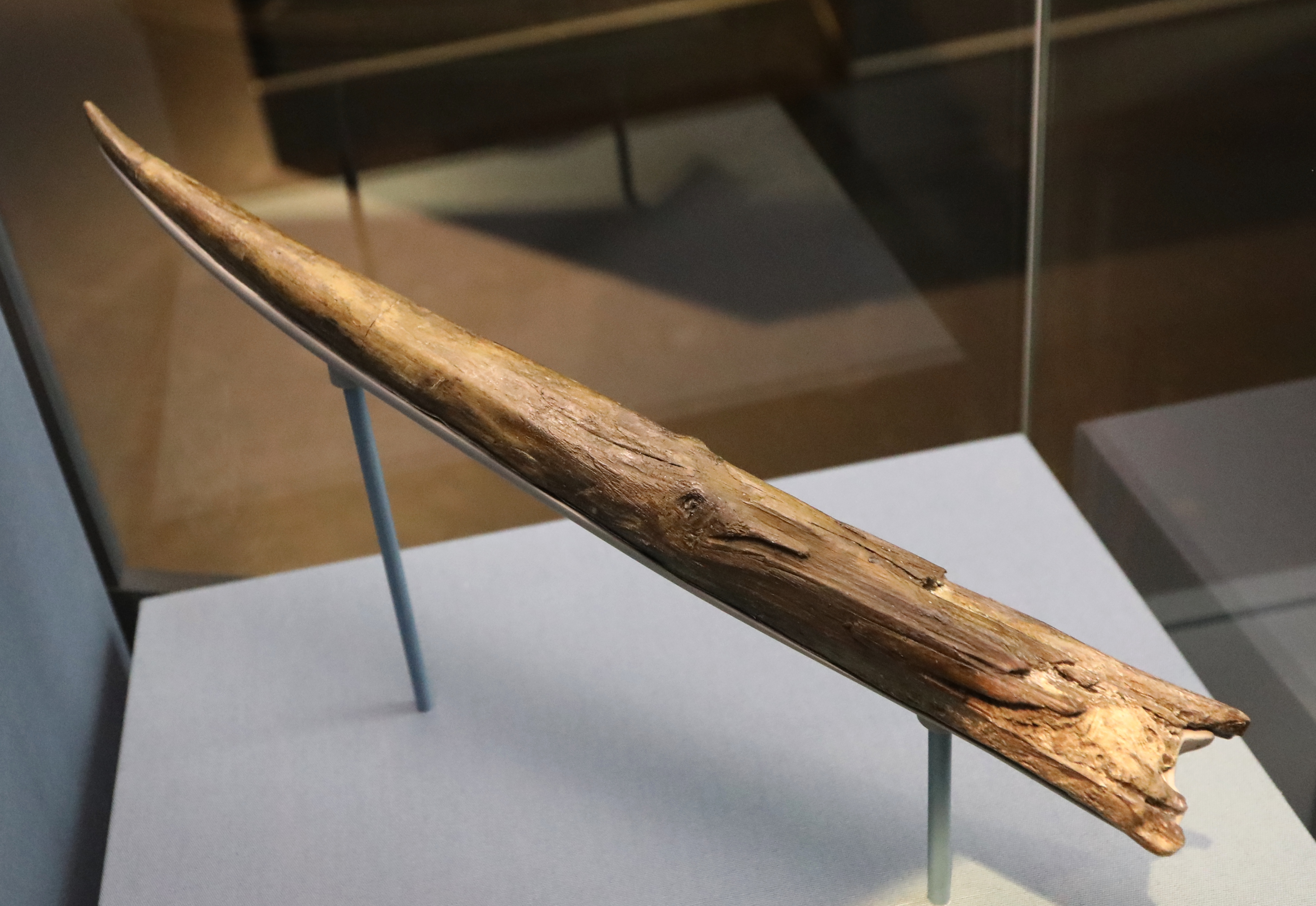
- Clacton Spear at the Natural History Museum, London
- Material: European yew (Taxus baccata)
- Size: length: 387 mm width: 39 mm
- Created: c. 420,000 years ago
- Period/culture: Hoxnian (Marine Isotope Stage 11)
- Discovered: 1911; Clacton-on-Sea, England
- Discovered by: Samuel Warren
- Present location: London, England
- Culture: Clactonian (presumably)

The Clacton Spear, or Clacton Spear Point, is the tip of a wooden spear discovered in Clacton-on-Sea in 1911. Dating to the Hoxnian interglacial, at approximately 400,000 years old, it is the oldest known worked wooden weapon.

== Description ==
The spear is made from Taxus baccata (European yew) wood that has been shaped into a point. When found, was 387 mm (15.2 in) long, 39 mm (1.5 in) diameter and straight, but drying out during the first decades of storage shrank the artifact to 367 by 37 mm (14.4 by 1.5 in) and warped it slightly into a curve. Treatment by wax impregnation in 1952 apparently stabilized it. At some time before this, the last 32 mm (1.3 in) of the tip had broken off and had been re-attached by conservators. This tip again came off in 2013 and was re-attached. The spear is on display at the Natural History Museum, London, where its age is stated as 420,000 years.

Tests to reproduce the spear suggested that it had been formed by scraping with a curved flint tool of the type found on the same site, known as the Clactonian notch.

== Discovery and significance ==
The spear was discovered by Samuel Hazzledine Warren, an amateur pre-historian, who had been looking for simple stone tools in a known Palaeolithic sediment. He at first thought the artifact was an antler, but presented it to the Geological Society of London as a spear tip. This identification was generally accepted for some time. However, as it was not a whole spear and the great age meant that it was well before modern humans, many academics of the time doubted that the amount of planning required to manufacture such a spear and the use of it for hunting was within the cognitive capabilities of early hominids and they argued that the spear tip was a simpler tool, such as a digging stick. However, the 1995 discovery in Germany of several more complete spears of similar design that are approximately 300,000 years old, the Schöningen Spears, clearly demonstrated this capability for Neanderthals, and now the Clacton Spear is generally regarded as a spear point. It has generally been proposed to have been used as a handheld thrusting spear rather than a throwing spear based on the type of wood used and its dimensions, though its incomplete nature and heavy overlap between the tip shapes of throwing and thrusting spears complicates interpretations of its use.

== Context of find ==
The environment of deposition for the Clacton Spear, which dates to the Hoxnian interglacial (Marine Isotope Stage 11), around 425–375,000 years ago, has been interpreted as the border of a river valley, with the local vegetation being a mixture, primarily from a mixed oak forest and secondarily from a grassland. Faunal remains found in contemporaneous deposits in Clacton include the extinct horse Equus mosbachensis, red deer (Cervus elaphus), roe deer (Capreolus capreolus), wild boar (Sus scrofa), the extinct fallow deer species Dama clactoniana, aurochs (Bos primigenius), the Irish elk (Megaloceros giganteus), steppe bison (Bison priscus), the extinct giant beaver Trogontherium, the field vole (Microtus agrestis), the narrow-nosed rhinoceros (Stephanorhinus hemitoechus), Merck's rhinoceros (Stephanorhinus kirchbergensis), the straight-tusked elephant (Palaeoloxodon antiquus), and the lion Panthera fossilis.

The site is characteristic of the "Clactonian industry", which shows evidence of the production of lithic flake and core tools, but with little evidence for the production of handaxes. Many of the animal bones found at Clacton display evidence of butchery. At the site a bison metatarsal, a rhinoceros radius, and a red deer tibia appear to have been used as hammer tools (with the rhinoceros bone also showing evidence of butchery).

== See also ==
- Boxgrove Palaeolithic site
- Swanscombe Palaeolithic site
- Lehringen spear, a 120,000 year old yew wood spear from Germany also made by Neanderthals
- Kalambo structure a structure made out of notched wood found in Zambia, dating to at least 476,000 years ago
