= Clacton-on-Sea =

Seaside town in Essex, England

Coordinates: 51.7918°N 1.1457°E

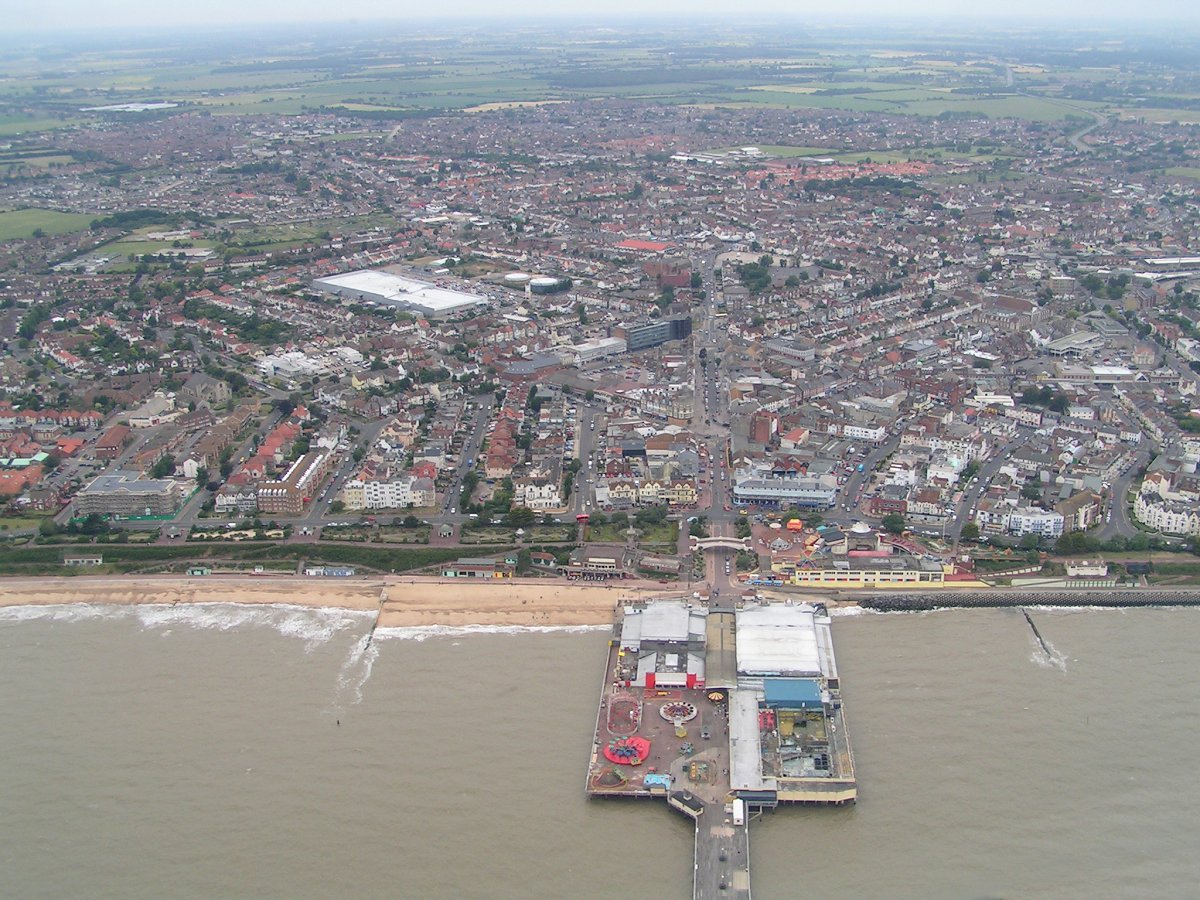
- Clacton-on-Sea from the air in 2004

- Location within Essex
- Population: 53,200 (Built-up area, 2021)
- OS grid reference: TM170150
- District: Tendring
- Shire county: Essex
- Region: East
- Country: England
- Sovereign state: United Kingdom
- Post town: CLACTON-ON-SEA
- Postcode district: CO15, CO16
- Dialling code: 01255
- Police: Essex
- Fire: Essex
- Ambulance: East of England
- UK Parliament: Clacton

Clacton-on-Sea, often simply called Clacton, is a coastal town in Essex, England. It lies on the Tendring Peninsula and is the largest settlement in the Tendring District, with a population of 53,200 in 2021. The town is situated around 77 miles (124 km) north-east of London, 16 miles (26 km) south-east of Colchester and 16 miles (26 km) south of Harwich. The area was historically in the parish of Great Clacton. The development of the seaside resort began in the 1870s and was called Clacton-on-Sea to distinguish it from the older village about 1 mile (1.6 km) inland. Great Clacton and Clacton-on-Sea were always administered together, forming a single urban district called Clacton between 1895 and 1974; the two settlements gradually merged into a single urban area during the 20th century. It lies within the Parliamentary constituency of Clacton.

== Geography ==
Clacton-on-Sea is located between Jaywick and Holland-on-Sea along the coastline; the original village of Great Clacton, now a suburb, lies to the north. The local authority is Tendring District Council.

It is at the south-eastern end of the A133. The resort of Frinton-on-Sea is nearby to the north-east.

== History ==
=== Early history ===
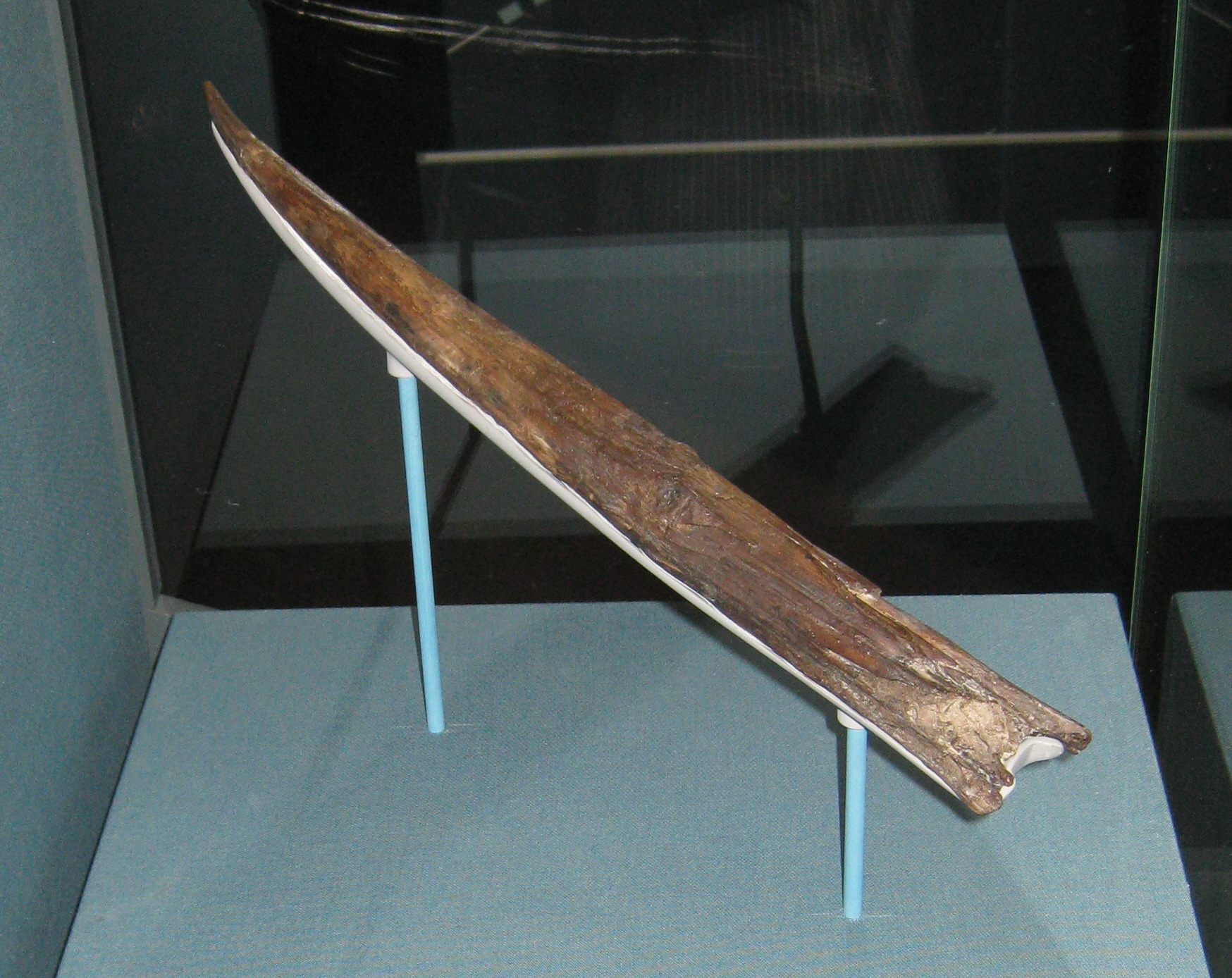
The Clacton Spear on display at the Natural History Museum, London

Deposits at Clacton have provided important evidence for the Lower Palaeolithic occupation of Britain by Homo heidelbergensis during the Hoxnian Interglacial, around 424–375,000 years ago, including stone tools of the titular Clactonian industry. At this time Britain had a temperate deciduous forest environment and climate similar to today. The "Clacton Spear", a wooden (yew) spear found in these deposits around Clacton in 1911 is the world's oldest known wooden spear.

The Domesday Book of 1086 records the village as Clachintuna.

Clacton was repeatedly surveyed by the Army in the Napoleonic Wars as a possible invasion beach-head for Napoleon and his Dutch allies. There was a large army and militia camp where Holland-on-Sea now stands. In 1810, five Martello Towers were built to guard the beaches between Colne Point to the south and what is now Holland-on-Sea to the north of the town.

In 1865, railway engineer and land developer Peter Bruff, the steamboat owner William Jackson, and a group of businessmen bought an area of undeveloped farmland adjoining low gravelly cliffs and a firm sand-and-shingle beach lying to the south-east of Great Clacton village, with the intention of establishing a new resort. One of the first facilities they built for the new resort was the pier, which opened in 1871, allowing visitors to travel by ship; the railway would not reach Clacton until 1882. The town of Clacton-on-Sea was laid out rather haphazardly over the next few years; though it has a central 'grand' avenue (originally Electric Parade, now Pier Avenue) the street plan incorporates many previously rural lanes and tracks, such as Wash Lane. Plots and streets were sold off piecemeal to developers and speculators. In 1882, the Great Eastern Railway already serving the well-established resort of Walton-on-the-Naze along the coast, opened a branch line to Clacton from a junction on the existing railway at Thorpe-le-Soken.

=== 20th century ===
Clacton grew into the largest seaside resort between Southend-on-Sea and Great Yarmouth, with around 10,000 residents by 1914 and 20,000 by 1939. Due to its accessibility from the East End of London and the Essex suburbs, the town, like Southend, remained preferentially geared to catering for working-class and lower-middle-class holidaymakers.

For well over a century, Clacton Pier has been used as an RNLI lifeboat station.

Just before the Second World War, the building of Butlin's Holiday Camp boosted its economy; the Army took it over between then and 1945 for use as an internment, engineer, pioneer and light anti-aircraft artillery training camp.

Notable incidents occurred in Clacton-on-Sea during the Second World War. A Luftwaffe Heinkel He 111 bomber crashed into the town on 30 April 1940, demolishing several houses in the Vista Road area as one of the magnetic mines on board exploded on impact, killing the crew and two civilians; another mine was defused by experts from the Navy. In addition, the Wagstaff Corner area was bombed in May 1941, demolishing some well-known buildings. Finally, a V-2 rocket hit in front of the Tower Hotel, injuring dozens of troops inside though without bringing down the structure. Clacton lay beneath the route taken by many of the V-1 flying bombs and V-2 rockets aimed at London.

A big role in the town during the pre- and post-war period was played by the Kingsman family, which bought and developed the pier and ran a pleasure-steamer service from London. A summer sea excursion to Calais also ran until the early 1960s. Butlin's reopened the holiday camp after the war. This, along with the expansion of the nearby chalet town of Jaywick, originally a speculative private development of inter-war years, and increasingly capacious caravan sites, all swelled by the movement of retired Londoners into the area, altered the character of the town.

Throughout the 1960s, Clacton beach remained a popular summer excursion for residents of Essex and east London and in August was often crammed to capacity in the area around the Pier. The pirate radio ship MV Galaxy (originally known as USS Density), which broadcast Wonderful Radio London, was anchored offshore from 1964 until its forced closure in 1967.

With the advent of cheap flights to Mediterranean resorts in the 1970s, the holiday industry began to decline. Pier Ward, in the centre of the town, is one of the poorest in England; nearby Jaywick was cited as the poorest of all in 2025.

Since around 1970, several well-known local buildings have been demolished, including the palatial art deco Odeon Cinema , the Warwick Castle Pub; the Waverley Hotel; Barker House, a large home for the learning disabled and John Groom's Crippleage which housed orphaned handicapped girls from London. Cordy's, a well-known large seafront restaurant has recently been demolished. The site of Butlin's Holiday Camp was redeveloped as a housing estate. The once famously crowded bus station in Jackson Road has become a car park. The Ocean Revue Theatre, where Max Bygraves made one of his first appearances, has closed.

The town expanded substantially in the 1980s, 1990s and first decade of the 21st century, with new housing estates on the rural margins of town, and some brownfield developments. Many residents commute to work in Colchester, Witham, Chelmsford or London. Clacton was in the news when its town centre and seafront areas were struck by an F1/T2 tornado on 23 November 1981, as part of the record-breaking nationwide tornado outbreak on that day.

=== 21st century ===
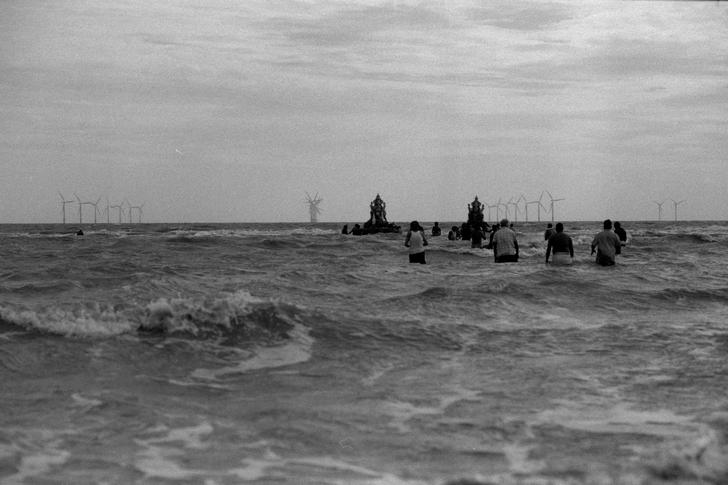
Wind turbines are seen in the distance from Clacton-on-Sea beachfront, as a Hindu Ganesh Visarjan (immersion ceremony) is observed in the North Sea

Gunfleet Sands Offshore Wind Farm, built in the early 2000s, is around 3 nautical miles (5.6 km) offshore, is visible from many places in the flat hinterland of the town.

As is common with many English seaside towns, unemployment has remained stubbornly high in Clacton. In 2023, the town was awarded a £20 million government levelling-up grant to improve the town centre.

== Seaside resort ==
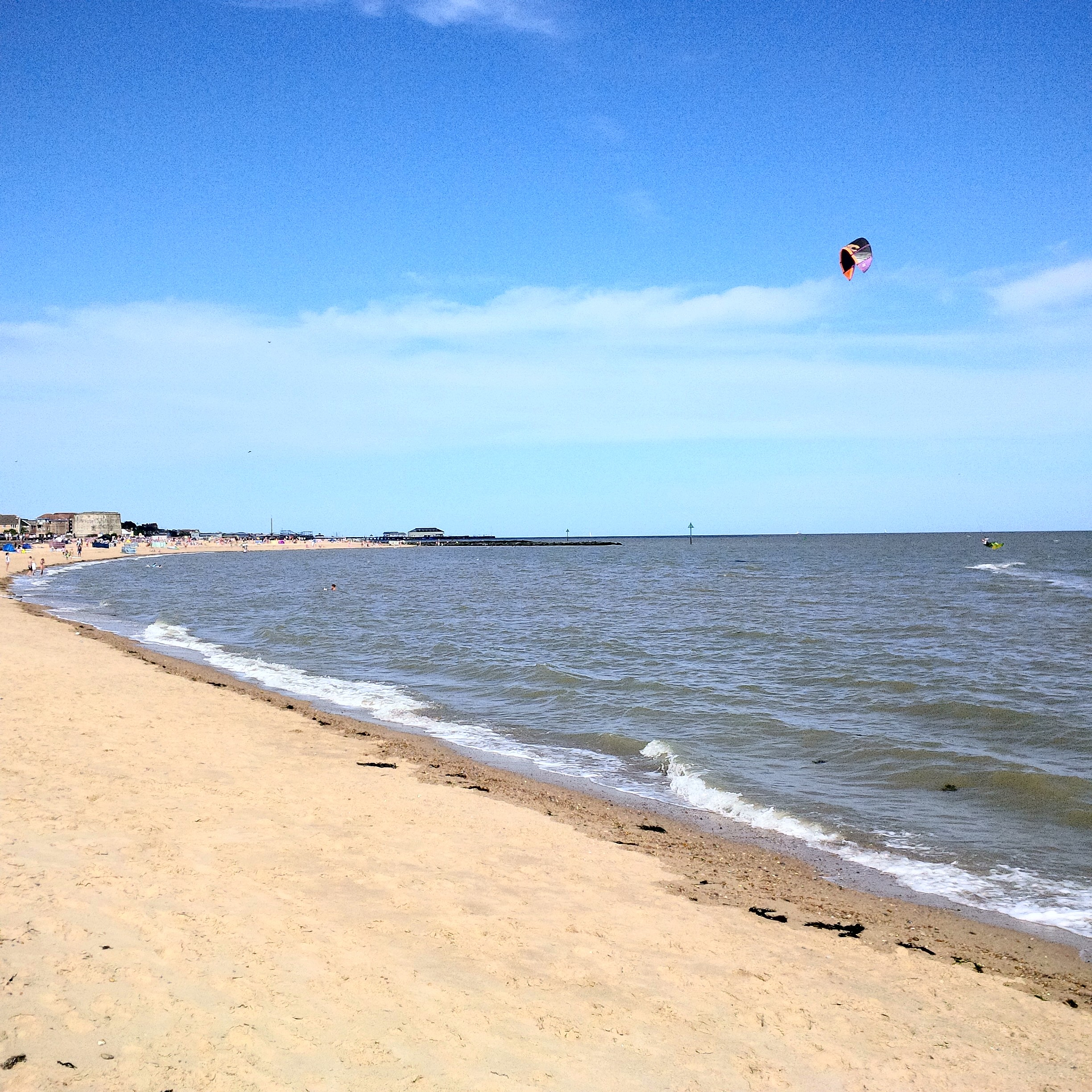
West Beach

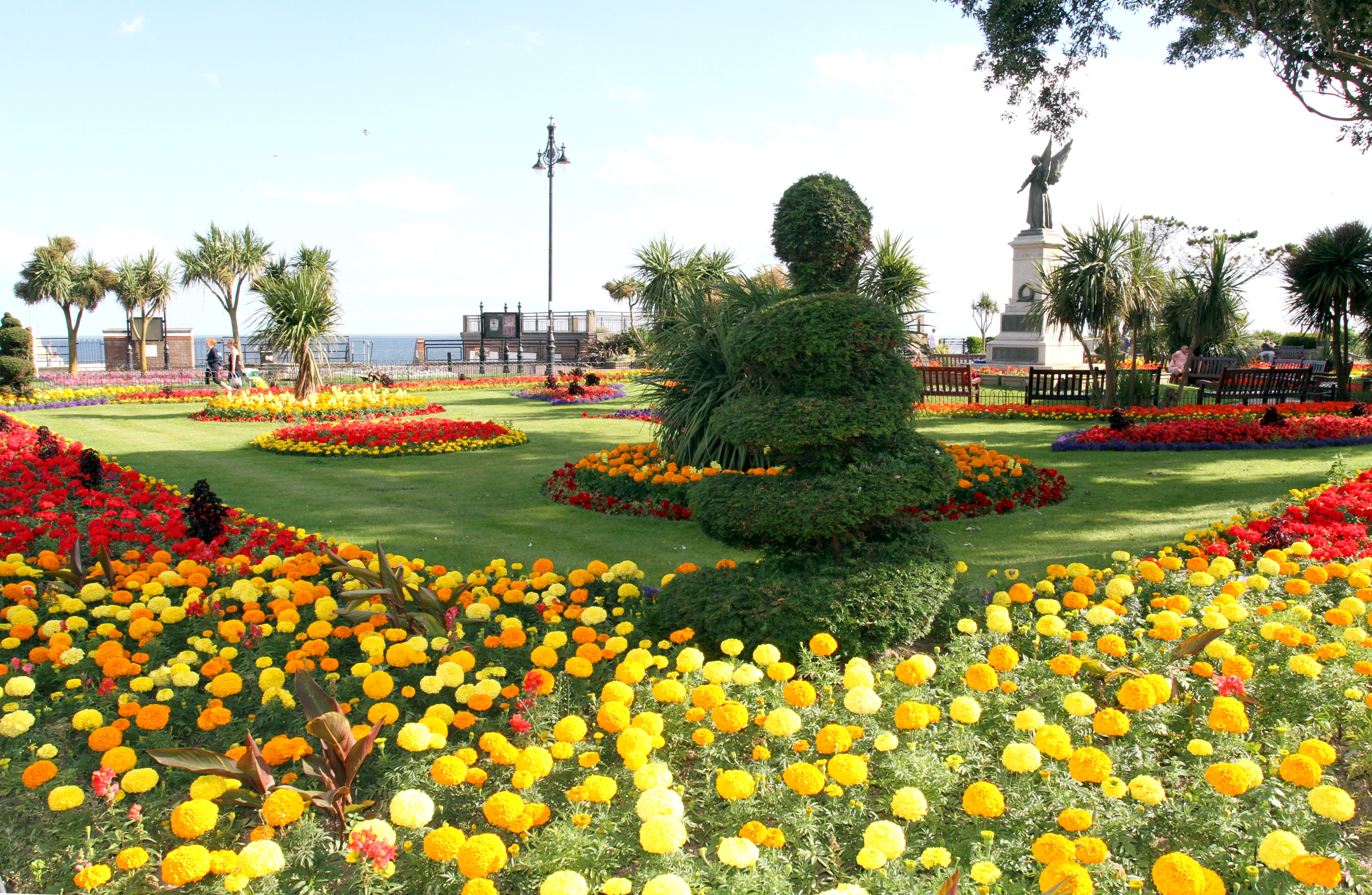
Garden of Remembrance

The modern day Clacton-on-Sea was founded by Peter Bruff in 1871 as a seaside resort. Originally the main means of access was by sea; Steamships operated by the Woolwich Steam Packet Company docked from 1871 at Clacton Pier which opened the same year. The pier now offers an amusement arcade and many other forms of entertainment.

People who wanted to come by road had to go through Great Clacton. In the 1920s, London Road was built to cope with the influx of holidaymakers. Later, in the 1970s, the eastern section of the A120 was opened, obviating the need for Clacton visitors to go through Colchester. Today the Paddle Steamer Waverley operates from Clacton Pier, offering pleasure boat excursions.

Clacton has a Blue Flag beach at Martello Bay; there are two more locally at Dovercourt Bay and Brightlingsea. Clacton Seafront Gardens which run along the top of the seafront west of Clacton Pier has also been awarded a Green Flag; it includes various sections with formal gardens, memorials and places to sit.

=== Butlin's holiday camp ===
In 1936, Billy Butlin bought and refurbished the West Clacton Estate, an amusement park to the west of the town. He opened a new amusement park on the site in 1937 and then, a year later on 11 June 1938, opened the second of his holiday camps. This location remained open until 1983 when, due to changing holiday tastes, Butlins decided to close the facility. It was then purchased by former managers of the camp who reopened it as a short-lived theme park, called Atlas Park. The land was then sold and redeveloped with housing.

== Governance ==
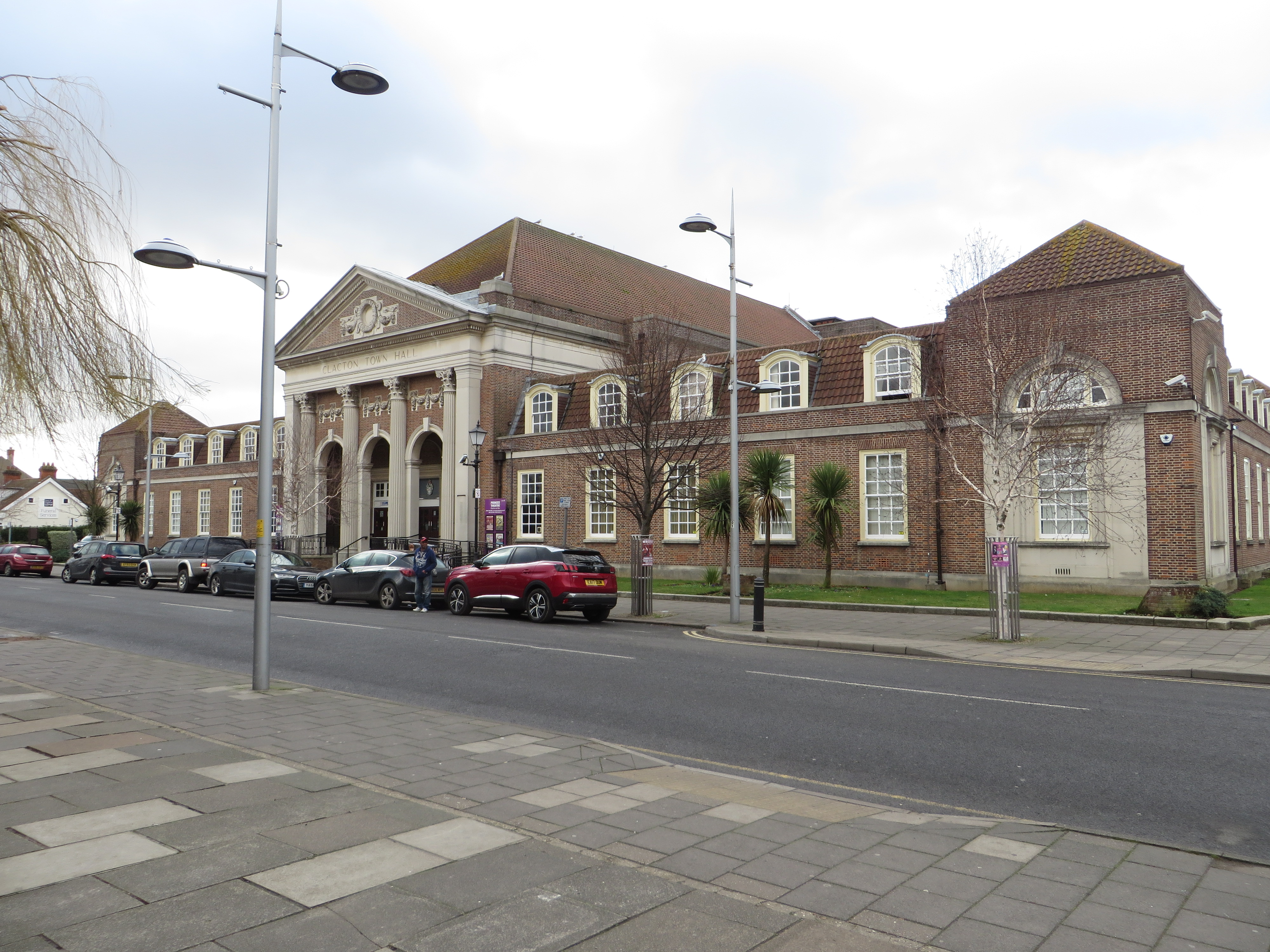
Clacton Town Hall

There are two tiers of local government covering Clacton, at district and county level: Tendring District Council, which is based at Clacton Town Hall and Essex County Council, based in Chelmsford.

The ancient parish was called Great Clacton. Until 1891, the parish was administered by its vestry in the same way as most rural areas. As the area became more populous, largely due to the growth of the seaside resort, more urban forms of government were required. The parish of Great Clacton was made a local government district in 1891, governed by a local board. Such local boards were reconstituted as urban district councils in 1894. In 1895, the council changed the name of the urban district from Great Clacton to simply Clacton. The legal name of the parish which covered the same area as the urban district remained Great Clacton, but as an urban parish it had no separate parish council. The neighbouring parish of Little Holland covering Holland-on-Sea was abolished in 1934 and absorbed into Clacton.

Clacton Urban District Council built the Town Hall on Station Road to serve both as its headquarters and as a public hall and theatre for the town, with the theatre now called the Princes Theatre. It is a neo-Georgian building, with a tall portico of composite columns flanked by two-story wings. The architect was Sir Alfred Brumwell Thomas and it was completed in 1931. It was abolished in 1974, under the Local Government Act 1972, with the area becoming part of the new Tendring District. No successor parish was created for the former urban district and so it became an unparished area, directly administered by Tendring District Council.

The Member of Parliament for the Clacton constituency is currently Nigel Farage, the leader of Reform UK elected on 14 August 2026. He was previously in the role from 5 July 2024 (following the 2024 general election) to 7 July 2026, when he resigned, due to an ongoing parliamentary standards investigation. On 14 August 2026, Farage was returned as MP, following the 2026 Clacton by-election, with 63.3% of the vote, although the poll was boycotted by all of the main Westminster parties, who described it as "a stunt". The second placed candidate, Count Binface, won 27% of the vote.

== Industry ==
Clacton Urban District Council had provided the town with electricity since the early twentieth century from Clacton power station. Upon nationalisation of the electricity industry in 1948, ownership passed to the British Electricity Authority and later to the Central Electricity Generating Board. Electricity connections to the national grid rendered the small 2.15 megawatt (MW) internal combustion engine power station redundant. It closed in 1966; in its final year of operation it delivered 796 MWh of electricity to the town.

In 2013, Tendring District Council undertook significant work to develop a ten-year economic strategy for the district which includes Clacton on Sea. Now, half-way through this 10-year strategy, the approach has been refreshed to add a greater focus on the populations of Clacton and Jaywick Sands between 2020 and 2024, noting a decline in economic performance of these locations. The strategy focuses specifically on local participation within communities and addressing long term prosperity and also proposes bold action in Clacton town centre, recognising that its future is unlikely to be led by retail. In 2023, Clacton had the highest proportion within the UK of people classed as "economically inactive."

== Landmarks ==
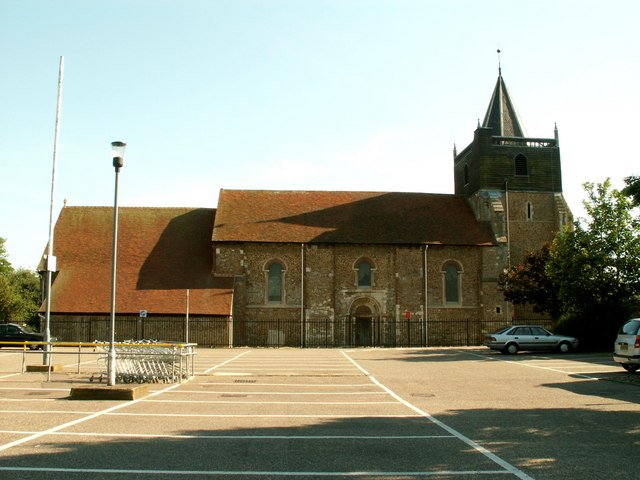
St John the Baptist Church, Great Clacton

Clacton has comparatively few buildings of architectural interest. In addition to the surviving large seafront hotels, these are:

=== St John's Church, Great Clacton ===
Originally the Catholic church of the village of Great Clacton (since subsumed into Clacton-on-Sea) St John's is a Norman church constructed under orders of Bishop Richard de Belmeis sometime in the 12th century alongside St Osyth’s Priory and restored in the 14th and 15th centuries before more recent renovations in 1810, 1866, and most recently 1913. In the late 16th century the vicar was Eleazer Knox (d. 1591) son of John Knox and Marjory Bowes of Norham. A local legend that smugglers used a tunnel from the coast to the Ship Inn (16th century) opposite the church is discounted by historians; the pub is more than 1.5 km from the sea. The nearby Queens Head inn may date pre-1600.

=== St James's Church ===
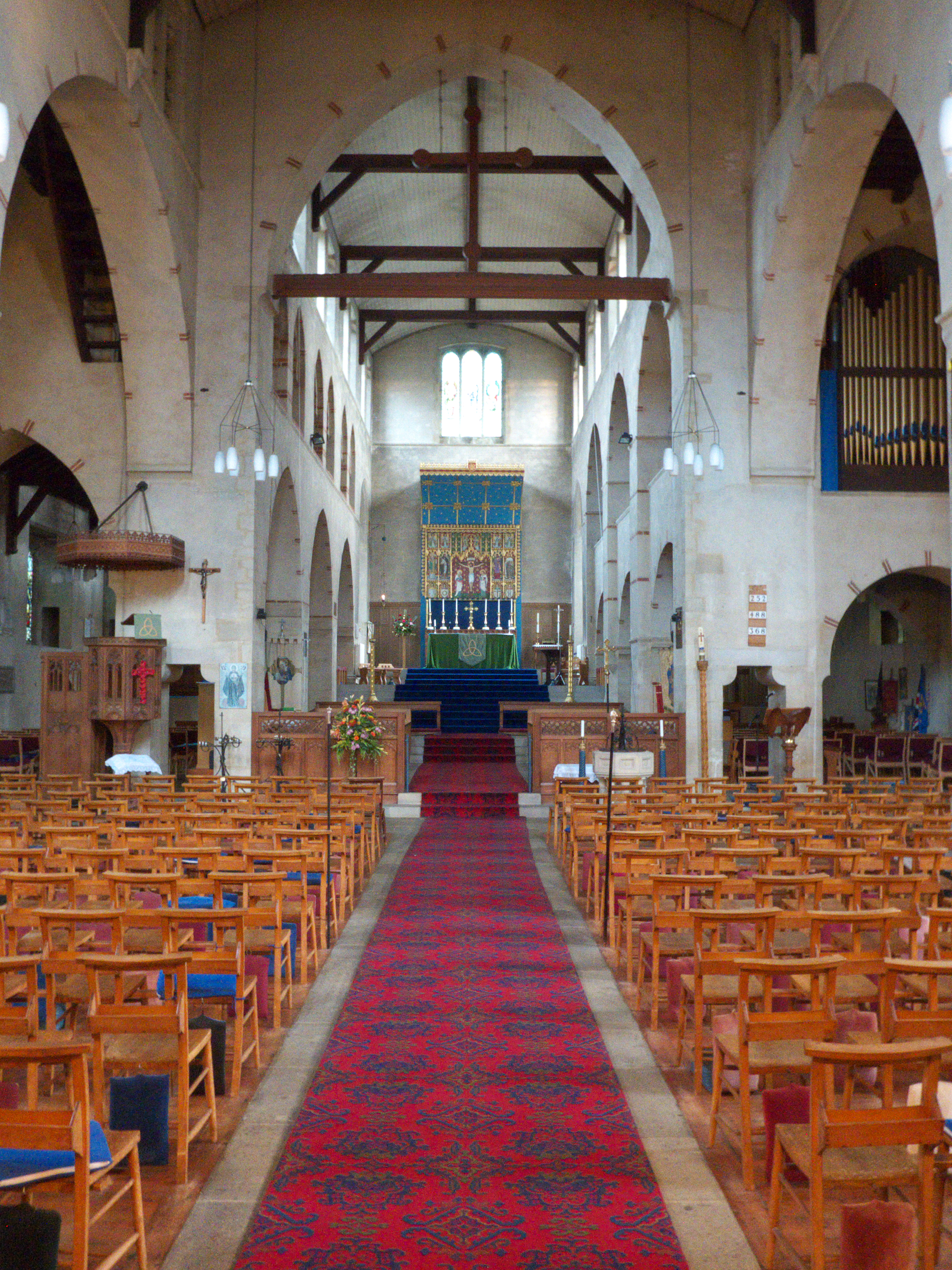
The Parish Church of St James

A large (and actually unfinished) church of 1912-13 between Tower Road and Wash Lane, St James's is a rare southern building by Temple Moore, an architect chiefly associated with the North of England. Somewhat grim on the outside (as Pevsner noted in The Buildings of Essex), the interior is surprisingly light and spare, with different orders of arch on either side of the chancel giving an asymmetrical feel. The building is only a third of its intended size; the original plans had included a large tower at the west end. Ordered for Anglo-Catholic worship, it is large, without pews, and boasts an impressive reredos which finishes in a canopy at the east end.

=== Railway station ===
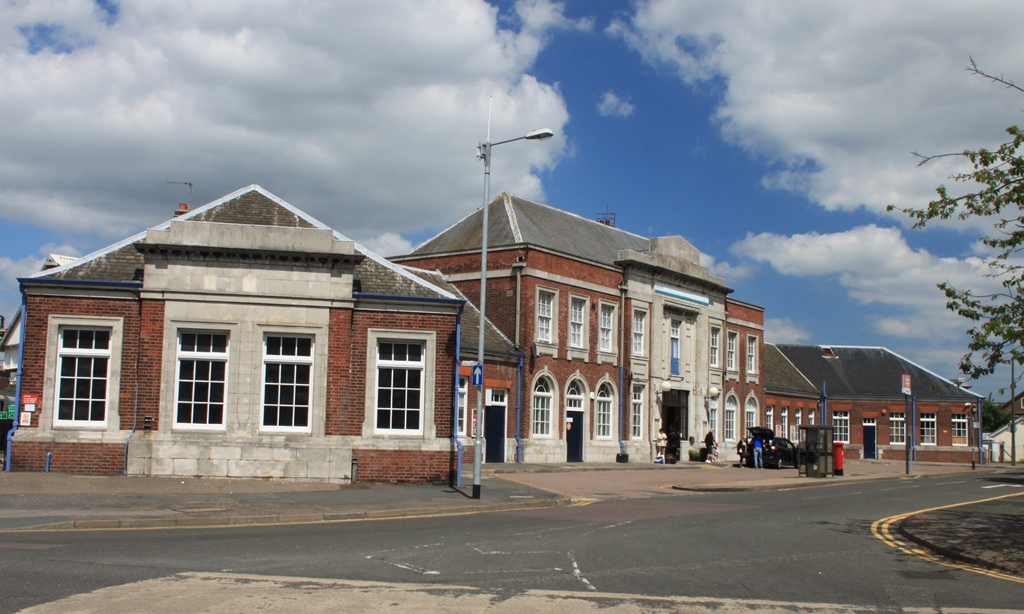
The railway station building

The typical neo-Georgian 'late Imperial'-style station building dates from 1929. It is notable for the decorative use of moulded 'fasces' on either side of the main entrance.

=== Martello Towers ===
There are three Martello towers between the pier and Jaywick Sands to the south; they date from 1809 to 1812. The immensely thick brick walls look circular but are, in fact, rounded triangles, designed to deflect cannon-fire. The tower nearest the pier was, unusually, built within a moat; the name comes from a similar fortification, Torra di Mortella in Corsica.

=== Moot Hall ===
A real oddity: in Albany Gardens West, near the seafront to the north of the pier, this house of the 1400s was moved from the village of Hawstead, Suffolk and reconstructed here in 1911 – though considerably modernised and altered – for a London builder named J H Gill.

=== St Helena Hospice ===
The former hospice is situated in Jackson Road, in the town centre. It has a curved wood and brick corner design of 2001–2 by the Purcell Miller Tritton architectural partnership. The building has been redeveloped and now houses 18 modern, privately-let dwellings.

=== Jaywick Sands ===
A huddle of self-builds and kit-houses were built in the 1920s and '30s in a bleak field dangerously close to the mean sea level. It has been described as resembling "a shanty town", but it also has its admirers who call it "a great place to live."

Jaywick was attractive to workers from the Ford plant in Dagenham, who bought strips of cheap agricultural land for holiday homes. Following the destruction of many East-End homes during the Second World War, they moved there permanently. The area was badly damaged by the floods of 1953, when 35 residents died; most settlements were swept away.

=== Clacton Pier ===
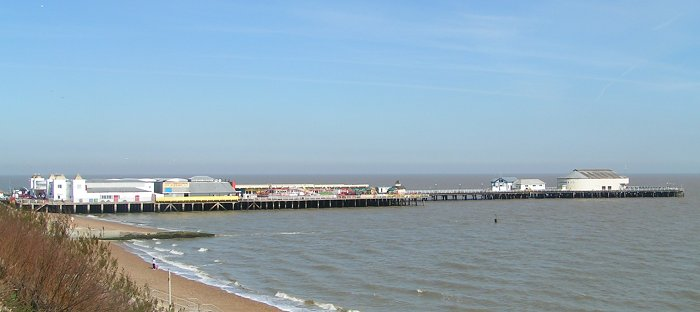
The pier, viewed from the south-west

Clacton Pier was the first building of the new resort of Clacton-on-Sea; it opened officially on 27 July 1871. It was 160 yd (150 m) in length and 12 ft (3.7 m) wide. It was built originally as a landing point for goods and passengers, as the town was becoming an increasingly popular destination for day trippers.

In 1893, the pier was lengthened to 390 yd (360 m) and entertainment facilities were added. Bought by Ernest Kingsman in 1922, it remained in the ownership of the Kingsman family until 1971. In March 2009, the pier was purchased by the Clacton Pier Company, who installed a 50 ft (15 m) helter-skelter as a new focal point.

=== Gunfleet Sands offshore wind farm ===
A 48-turbine wind farm is located 4.3 miles (7 km) south-east of the Clacton coast. It has been in commercial operation since 2010 and has an overall capacity of 173 MW.

== Climate ==
Clacton has an oceanic climate (Köppen "Cfb"), but with lower precipitation than most of the UK and Western Europe. This makes for warm and relatively dry summers, and also fairly chilly winter days. For the 1961–1990 observation period, Clacton averaged 103.7 days with at least 1 mm of rain and 24.3 air frosts a year; this is comparable to south-west coastal locations.

Climate data for Clacton 1961–1990, 16 m asl.
| Month | Jan | Feb | Mar | Apr | May | Jun | Jul | Aug | Sep | Oct | Nov | Dec | Year |
|---|---|---|---|---|---|---|---|---|---|---|---|---|---|
| Mean daily maximum °C (°F) | 6.1 (43.0) | 6.3 (43.3) | 8.6 (47.5) | 11.0 (51.8) | 14.8 (58.6) | 18.2 (64.8) | 20.3 (68.5) | 20.3 (68.5) | 18.1 (64.6) | 14.5 (58.1) | 9.7 (49.5) | 7.2 (45.0) | 14.5 (58.1) |
| Mean daily minimum °C (°F) | 1.8 (35.2) | 1.9 (35.4) | 3.1 (37.6) | 4.9 (40.8) | 8.3 (46.9) | 11.2 (52.2) | 13.3 (55.9) | 13.5 (56.3) | 11.7 (53.1) | 9.3 (48.7) | 5.0 (41.0) | 2.8 (37.0) | 7.2 (45.0) |
| Average precipitation mm (inches) | 49 (1.9) | 31 (1.2) | 43 (1.7) | 40 (1.6) | 40 (1.6) | 45 (1.8) | 43 (1.7) | 43 (1.7) | 48 (1.9) | 48 (1.9) | 55 (2.2) | 50 (2.0) | 535 (21.1) |
| Mean monthly sunshine hours | 58.3 | 75.6 | 117.6 | 155.9 | 207.8 | 211.9 | 200.1 | 199.3 | 153.4 | 117.9 | 75.0 | 54.2 | 1,627 |
Source: Met Office

== Demography ==
Clacton's population increased substantially during the 20th century from 7,456 at the 1901 census to 25,000 in the 1960s, 45,065 in 1991 and reaching over 53,000 by 2001. It was reported as 107,237 in the 2011 Census.

== Education ==
The town is served by two secondary schools: Clacton Coastal Academy and Clacton County High School.

== Transport ==
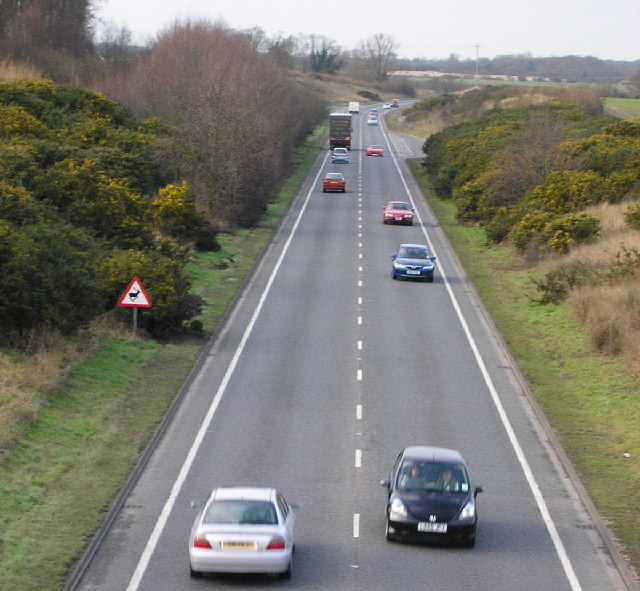
The A133 bypass at Weeley

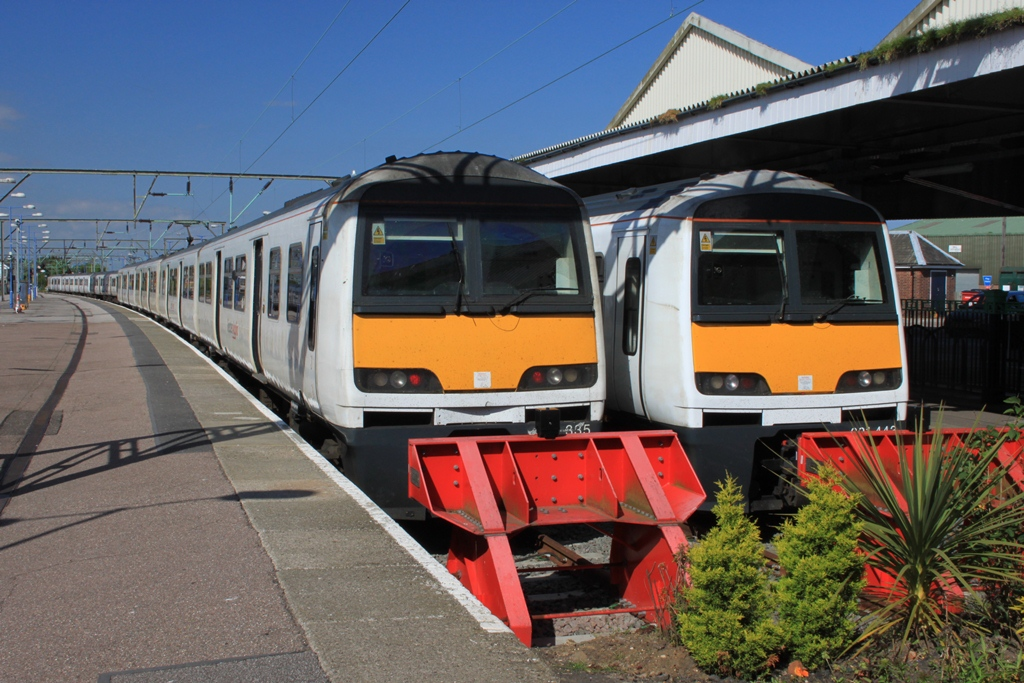
Class 321 trains at the station

Clacton-on-Sea is the eastern terminus of the A133 road, which links the town with Colchester.

Clacton-on-Sea railway station is one of three termini of the Sunshine Coast Line, which links the town with Colchester and Walton-on-the-Naze. Regular services to Colchester, Chelmsford and London Liverpool Street are operated by Greater Anglia.

Konectbus operates bus services in the area; routes link the town with Brightlingsea, Colchester, Harwich, Mistley and Walton-on-the-Naze.

Clacton Airfield has been active since its use by the Royal Air Force during the Second World War. It does not operate scheduled passenger flights.

== Media ==
Clacton and Frinton Gazette is the town's local newspaper.

== Notable people ==
The following were all born or have lived in Clacton-on-Sea:

- George Wylie Hutchinson (1852–1942), Canadian artist, lived in Clacton in retirement
- Arthur Townsend (1883–1937), long-distance runner
- Edward Pennell (1894–1974), WWI flying ace and politician
- Joan Kiddell-Monroe (1908–1972), author and illustrator of children's books
- Ivy Benson (1913-1993), musician, retired to Clacton in the early 1980s
- Pat Fletcher (1916–1985) golfer, born in Clacton-on-Sea and emigrated to Canada
- Jennifer Worth (1935–2011), nurse and musician
- Mike Everitt (born 1941), footballer
- Graham Hurley (born 1946), crime fiction writer
- Paul Barber (born 1951), actor
- Steve Foley (born 1953), footballer
- Stephen D. Nash (born 1954), wildlife artist
- Steve Wright (born 1959), footballer
- Barry Lamb (born 1963), musician, composer
- Beth Goddard (born 1969), actress
- Paul Banks (born 1978), singer
- Ian Westlake (born 1983), footballer
- Tom Eastman (born 1991), footballer.

== Cultural references ==
On the Easter weekend of 1964, rival youth gangs of Mods and Rockers descended upon Clacton-on-Sea; they created mild havoc by fighting with each other.

The music video for "Always on My Mind" by the Pet Shop Boys was filmed in Clacton, which was also the setting for their film It Couldn't Happen Here. Parts of the 2019 film Yesterday were also filmed in the town.

Clacton Airfield was featured in the BBC Television series Airport.

== Gallery ==
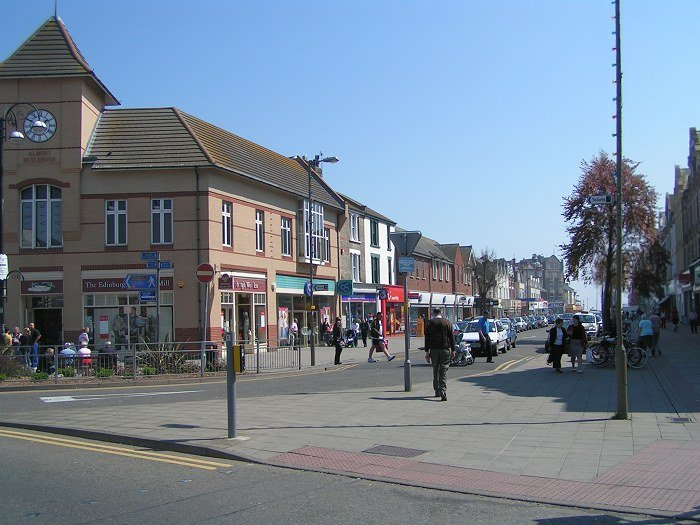
Town centre

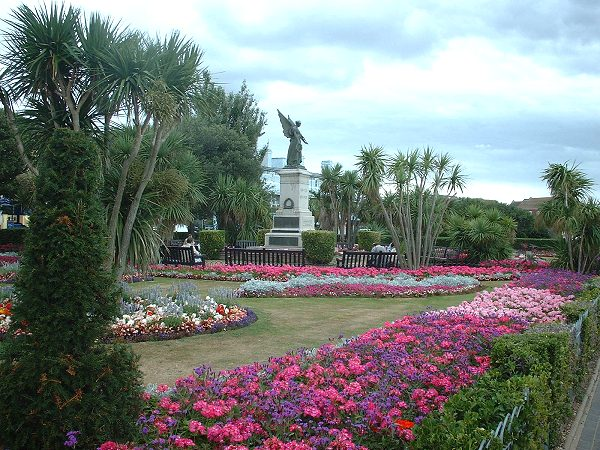
Memorial Gardens

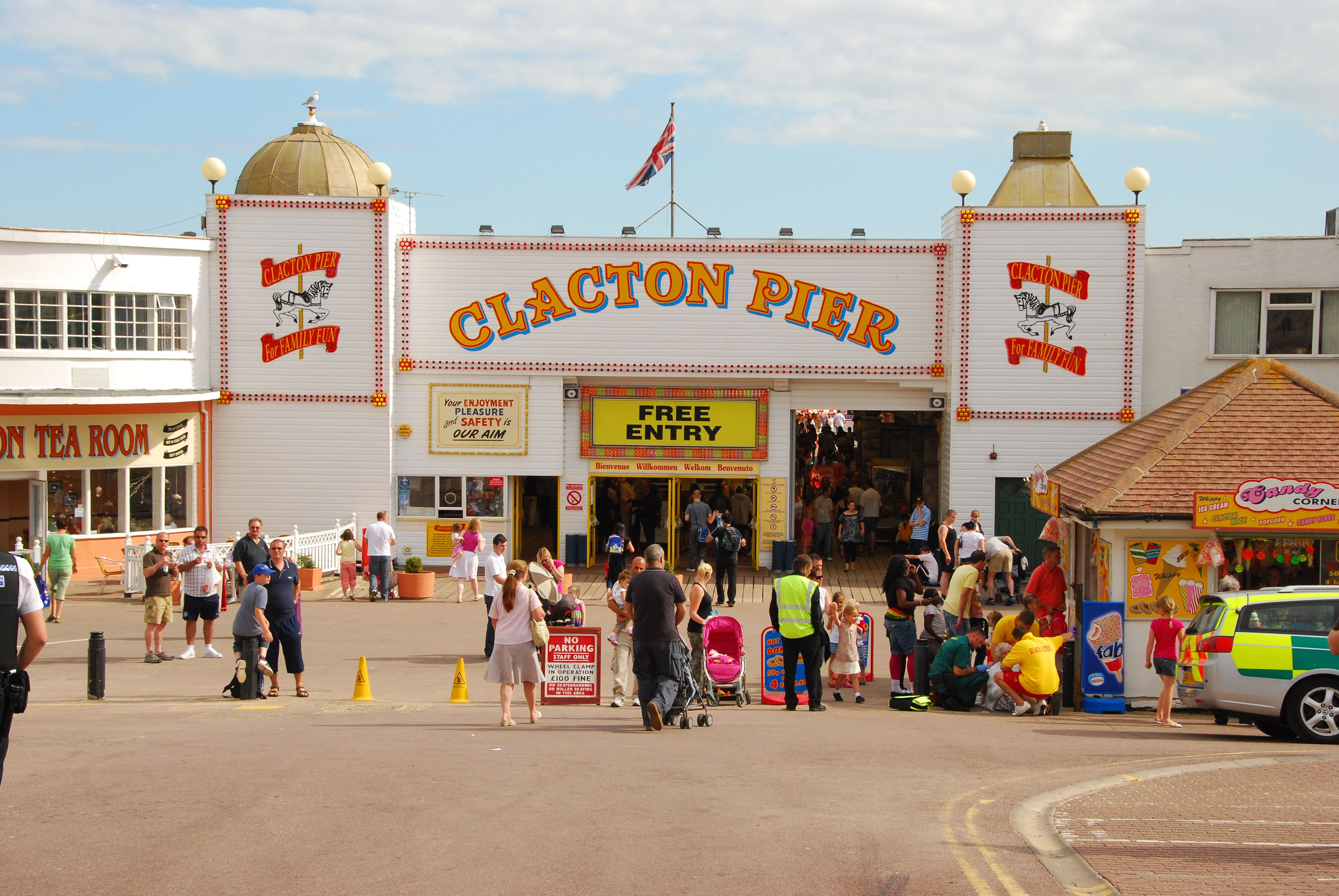
Pier entrance

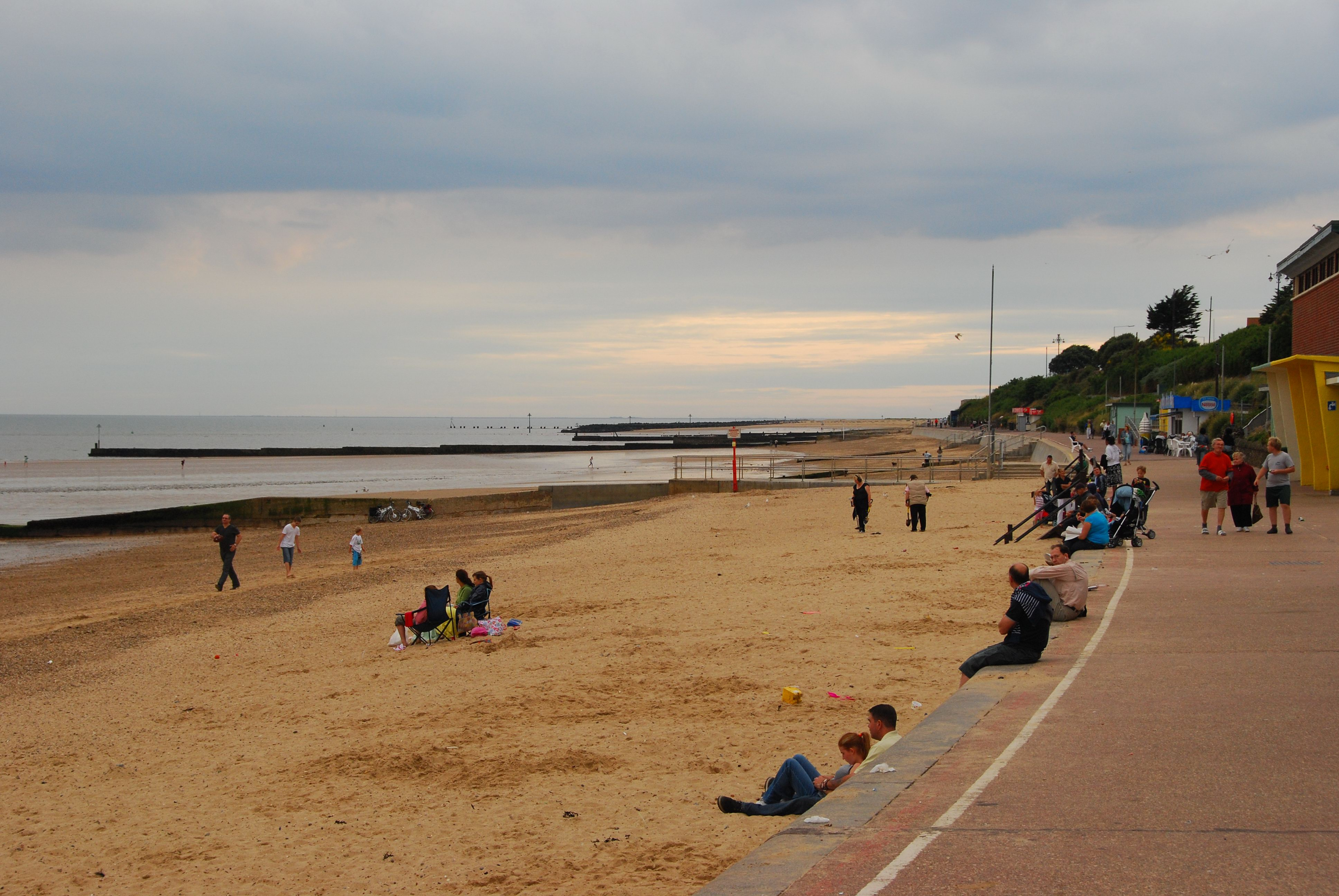
The beach

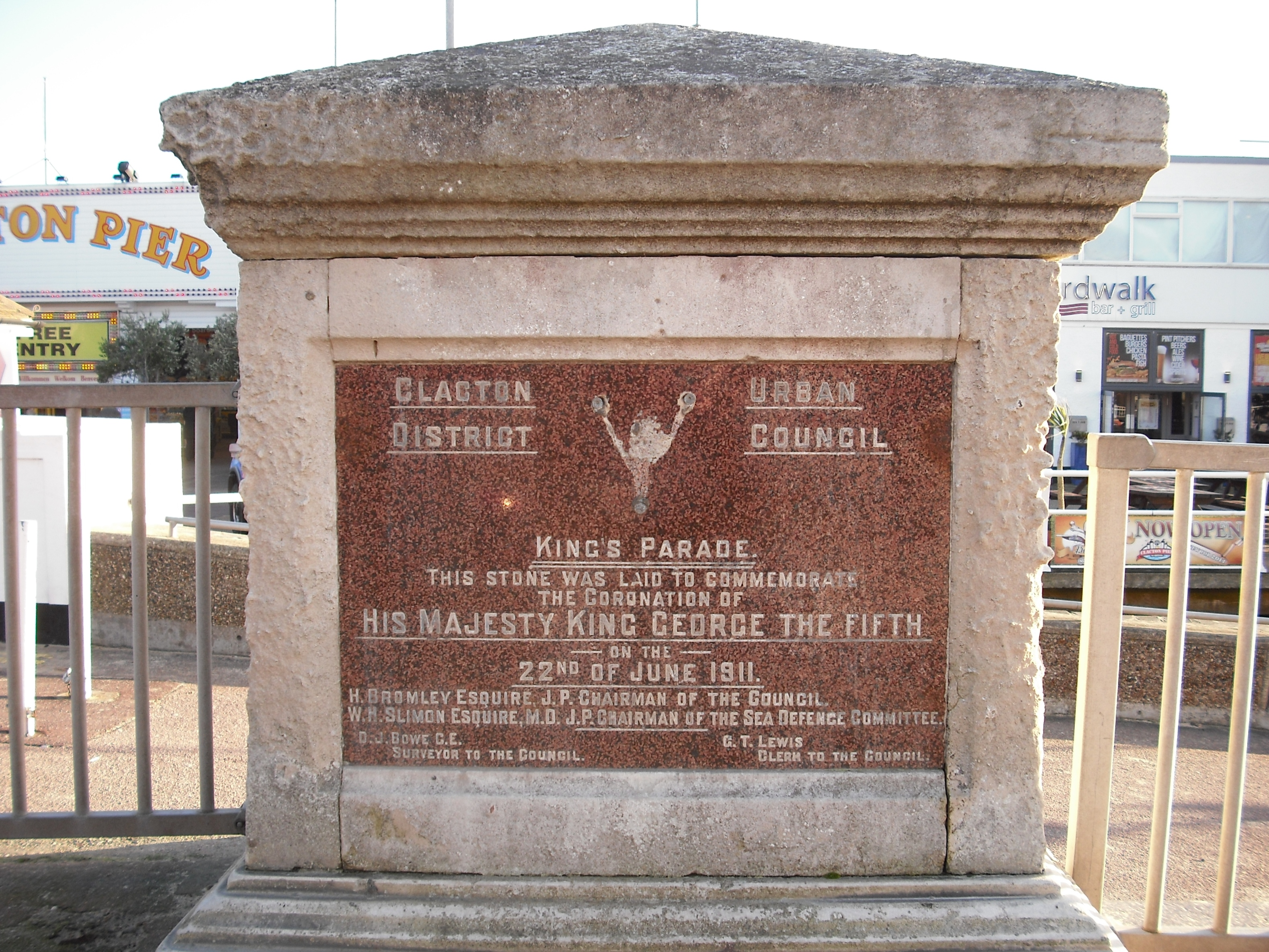
King's Parade commemorative stone, which dates from 1911

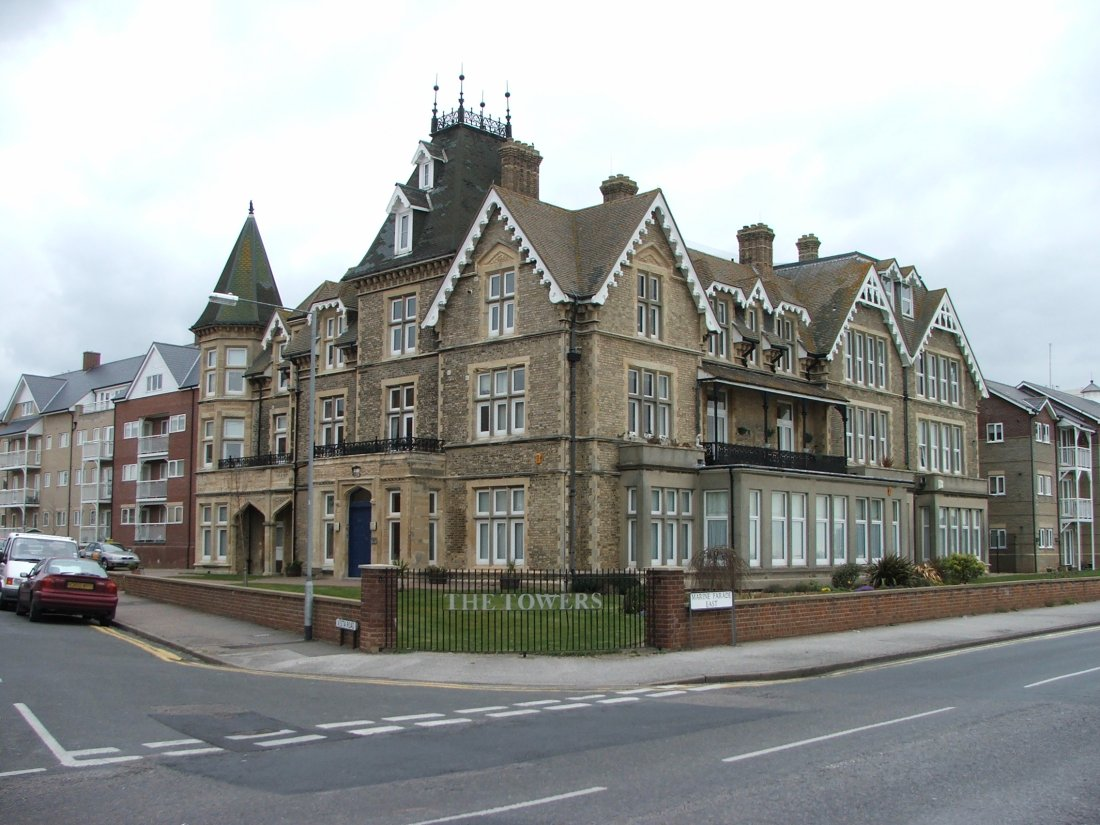
The Towers (once St Osyth's Teacher Training College hall of residence)

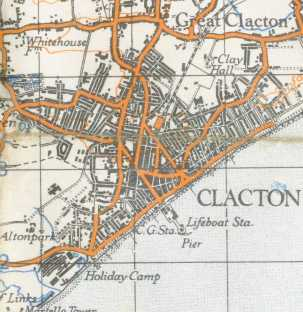
A map from 1940

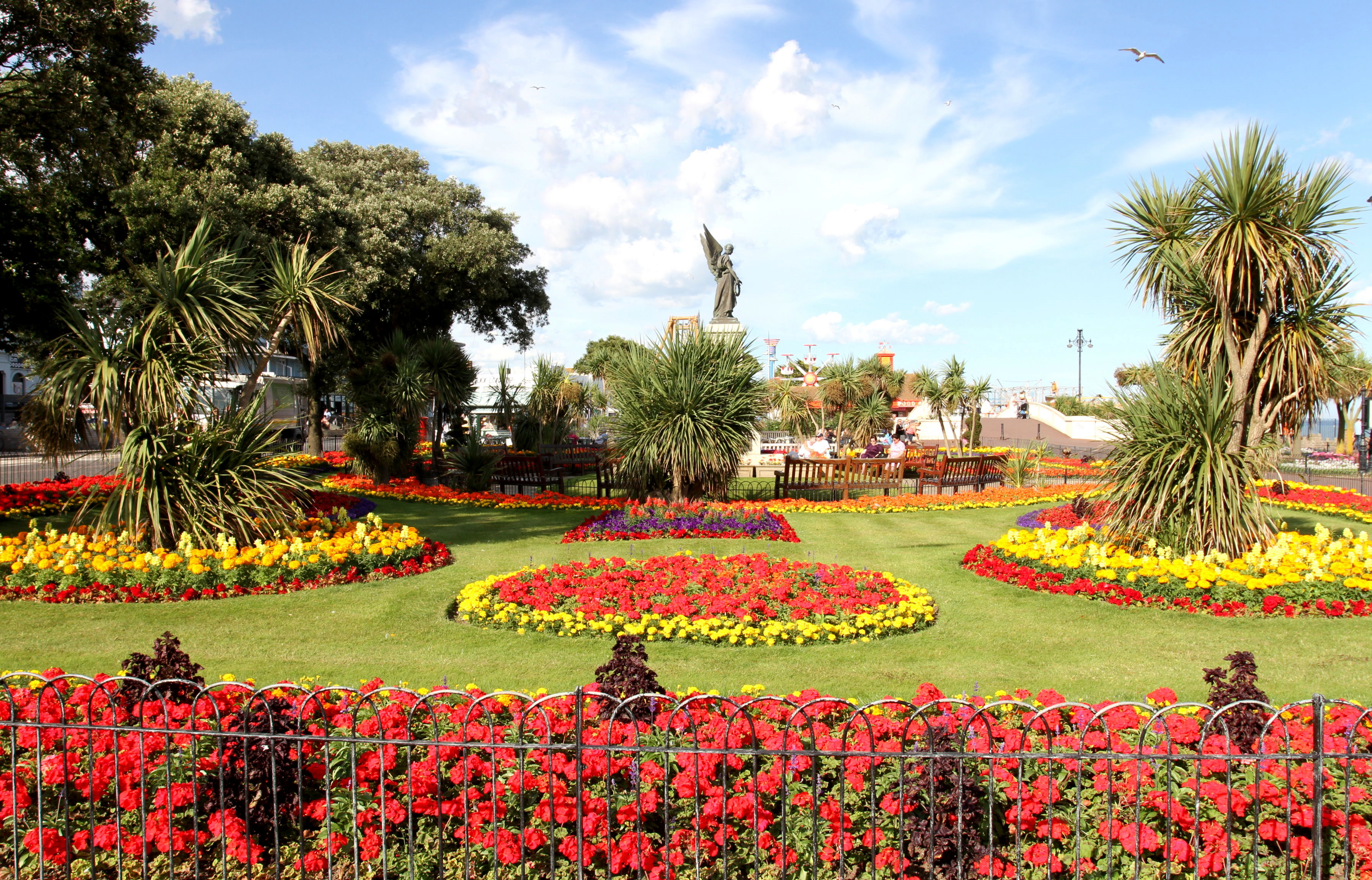
Garden of Remembrance

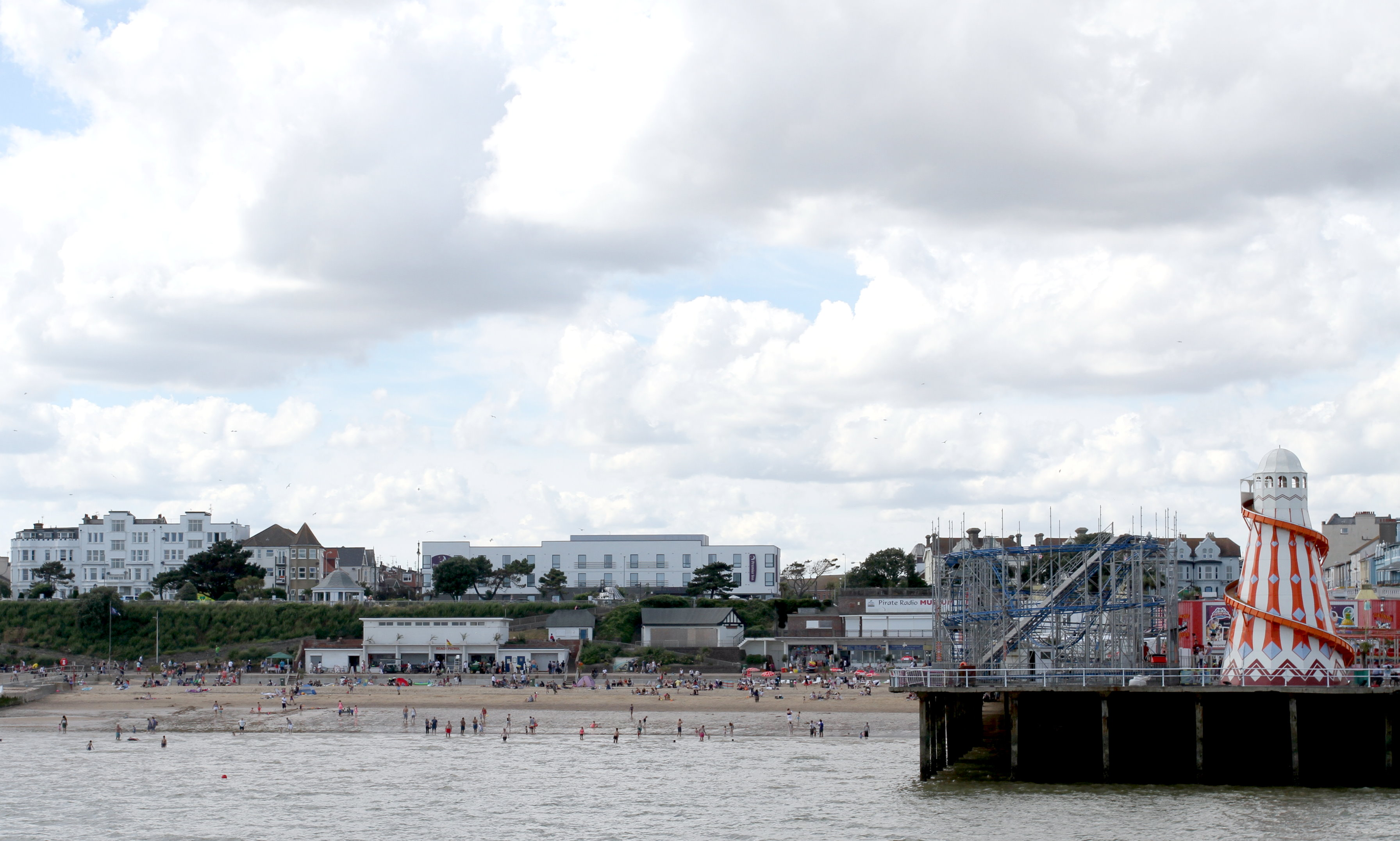
Clacton from the pier

== See also ==
- Clactonian Man
- Clacton in the 2024 general election
- Little Clacton
