= Swanscombe Palaeolithic site =

Archaeological site in England

Coordinates: 51°26′44.12″N 0°17′56.80″E

Swanscombe Skull Site
- Site of Special Scientific Interest
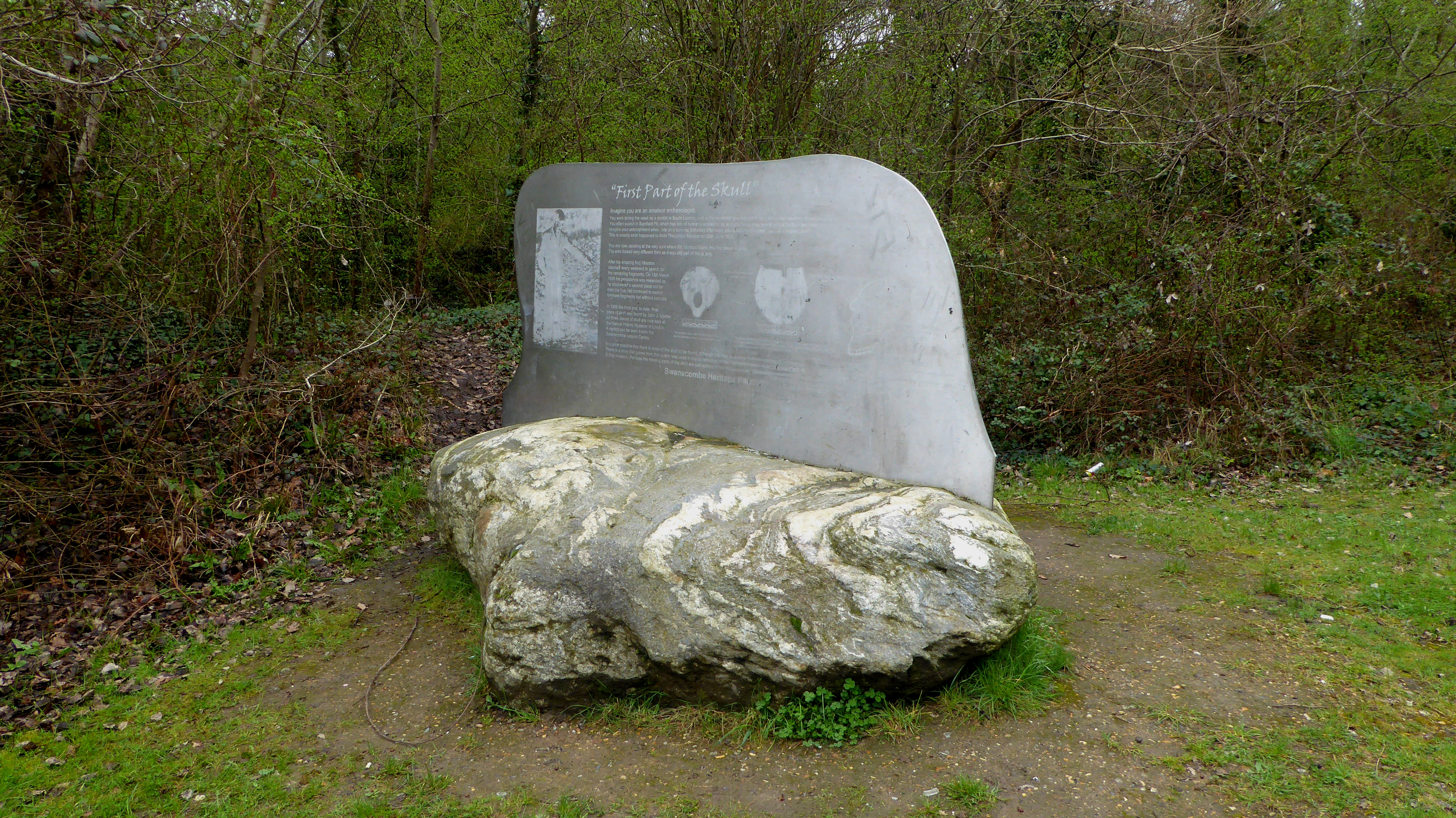
- Monument marking the place where the skull fragment was discovered in 1935
- Location of Swanscombe Skull Site.
- Area of search: Kent
- Grid reference: TQ 597 742
- Interest: Geological
- Area: 3.9 hectares (9.6 acres)
- Notification date: 1988
- Location map: Magic Map

The Swanscombe Skull Site is a 3.9-hectare (9.6-acre) geological Site of Special Scientific Interest (SSSI) and National Nature Reserve in Swanscombe, Kent, England, now forming part of the broader Swanscombe Heritage Park. The site lies within Barnfield Pit, the most significant of several former gravel quarries that once supplied raw materials to the nearby Swanscombe Cement Works, and contains two Geological Conservation Review sites. It dates to the Hoxnian interglacial (Marine Isotope Stage 11), around 425-375,000 years ago. It is best known for the fragmentary remains of the skull of an archaic human dubbed "Swanscombe Man", likely an early Neanderthal or Homo heidelbergensis.. Numerous stone artifacts, including handaxes, have also been recovered from the quarry

== History of research ==
The earliest archaeological remains were uncovered in Barnfield pit in the late 1880s, and the site has been subject to scientific research since then. Many of the artifacts from the site have been collected by workmen from Barnfield without clear stratigraphic context, though the site has been subject to several formal scientific investigations, including by Reginald Smith and Henry Dewey in the 1910s, R.H. Chandler in the 1920s, Alvin T. Marston in the 1930s and John Wymer in the 1950s and early 1960s. The excavations led by John d'Arcy Waechter in 1968-72 of Barnfield pit led to the adoption of a stratigraphic scheme for the sediments of the quarry that has been widely adopted by later authors.

== Geology ==
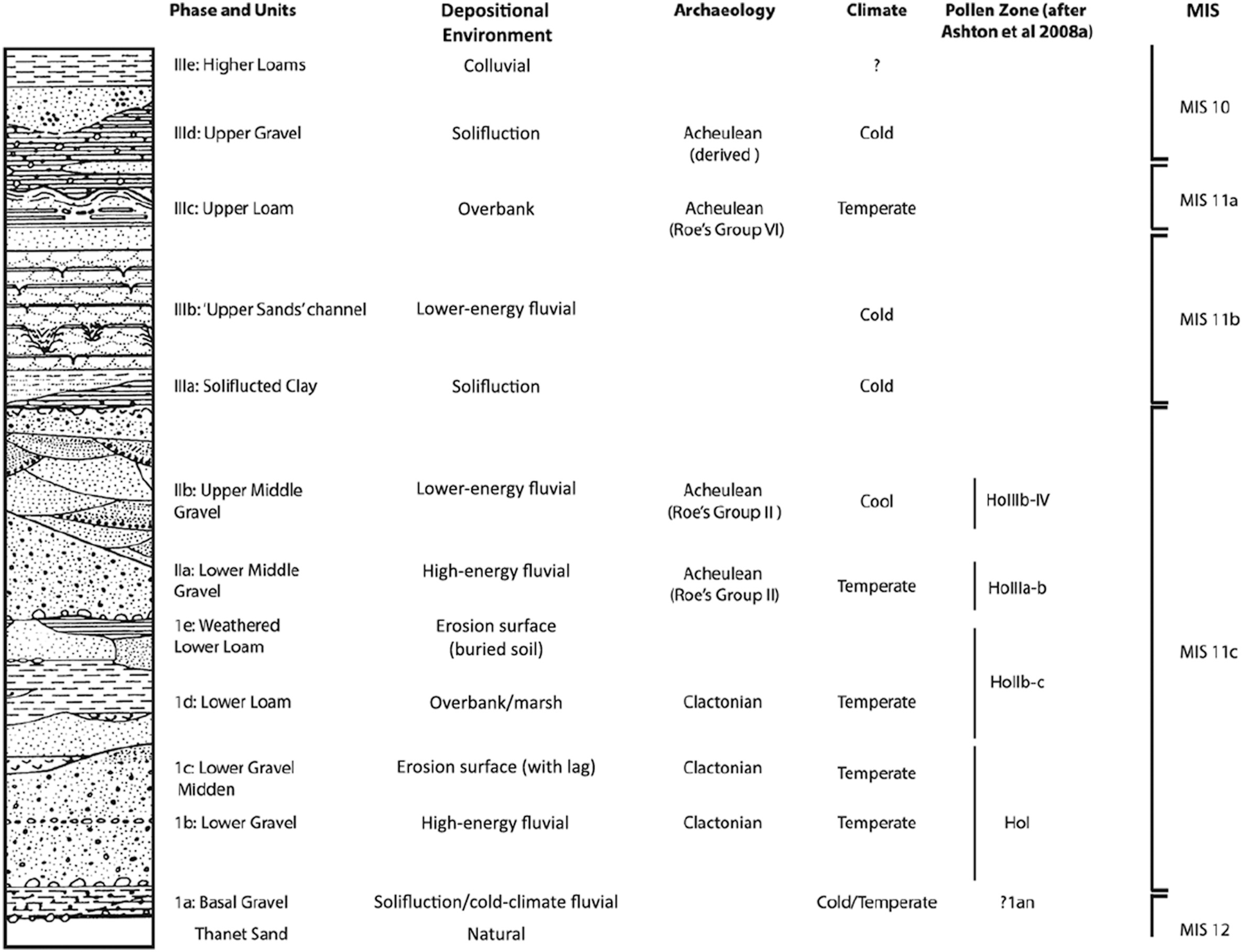
Stratigraphy of the Barnfield Pit succession

The Pleistocene sediments of the quarry overlie much older Paleocene aged rocks of the Thanet Formation. The earliest Pleistocene unit within the sequence, the "basal gravel" (Unit Ia), consists of gravel deposits dating to the Anglian glaciation (MIS 12 ~478-424,000 years ago). This is followed by sediments deposited by the nearby River Thames, forming part of a river terrace, dating to the Hoxnian interglacial (globally known as Marine Isotope Stage 11~425-375,000 years ago), the first of these units is the "Lower Gravel" (Ib), containing high energy fluvial sediments in some areas with "midden" (Ic) sediments containing archaeological artifacts and animal bones. This is then followed by the "Lower Loam" (Id), a soil layer formed in a marsh-like stagnant water environment. This is overlain by a second cycle of sediments corresponding to the widening of the Thames, beginning with the Lower Middle Gravel (IIa) and Upper Middle Gravel (IIb), the former of which is predominantly sandy gravel deposited in a high energy environment and the latter is predominantly sand in a somewhat lower energy environment. The sequence from the Lower Gravel to the Upper Middle Gravel is thought to have been deposited in the relatively warm substage MIS 11c. These deposits are followed in the western part of the quarry by the Soliflucted Clay (IIIa) and the Upper Sands (IIIb), which have that indicate that they were formed during a relatively cold period, likely MIS 11b. These deposits are absent elsewhere in the succession. This is followed by the Upper Loam, (IIIc), primarily formed of clay-rich sands likely deposited during the relatively warm MIS 11a substage. The upper surface of the Upper Loam is penetrated by deep ice wedge casts indicating subsequent cold conditions. The Upper Loam is then overlain by the Upper Gravel (IIId) (which despite its name is mostly clay with gravel pockets) and in some areas the Higher Loam (IIIe), which are thought to have been deposited during the cold conditions of MIS 10.

== Fauna and environment ==
Animals found at the site include the straight-tusked elephant (Palaeoloxodon antiquus), Irish elk (Megaloceros giganteus), the extinct fallow deer species Dama clactoniana, red deer (Cervus elaphus), roe deer (Capreolus capreolus) aurochs (Bos primigenius), Merck's rhinoceros (Stephanorhinus kirchbergensis), the narrow-nosed rhinoceros (Stephanorhinus hemitoechus), Barbary macaque (Macaca sylvanus), wild boar (Sus scrofa), Eurasian beaver (Castor fiber), European rabbit (Oryctolagus cuniculus), wild horse (Equus ferus), European wild ass (Equus hydruntinus), cave bear (Ursus spelaea), the grey wolf ancestor Canis mosbachensis, the large lion Panthera fossilis, and the European jaguar (Panthera gombaszogensis). The environment surrounding the Thames at the time of deposition during MIS 11c has been suggested to be a temperate forest of oak, alder and hazel, with some grassy areas.

== Archaeology ==
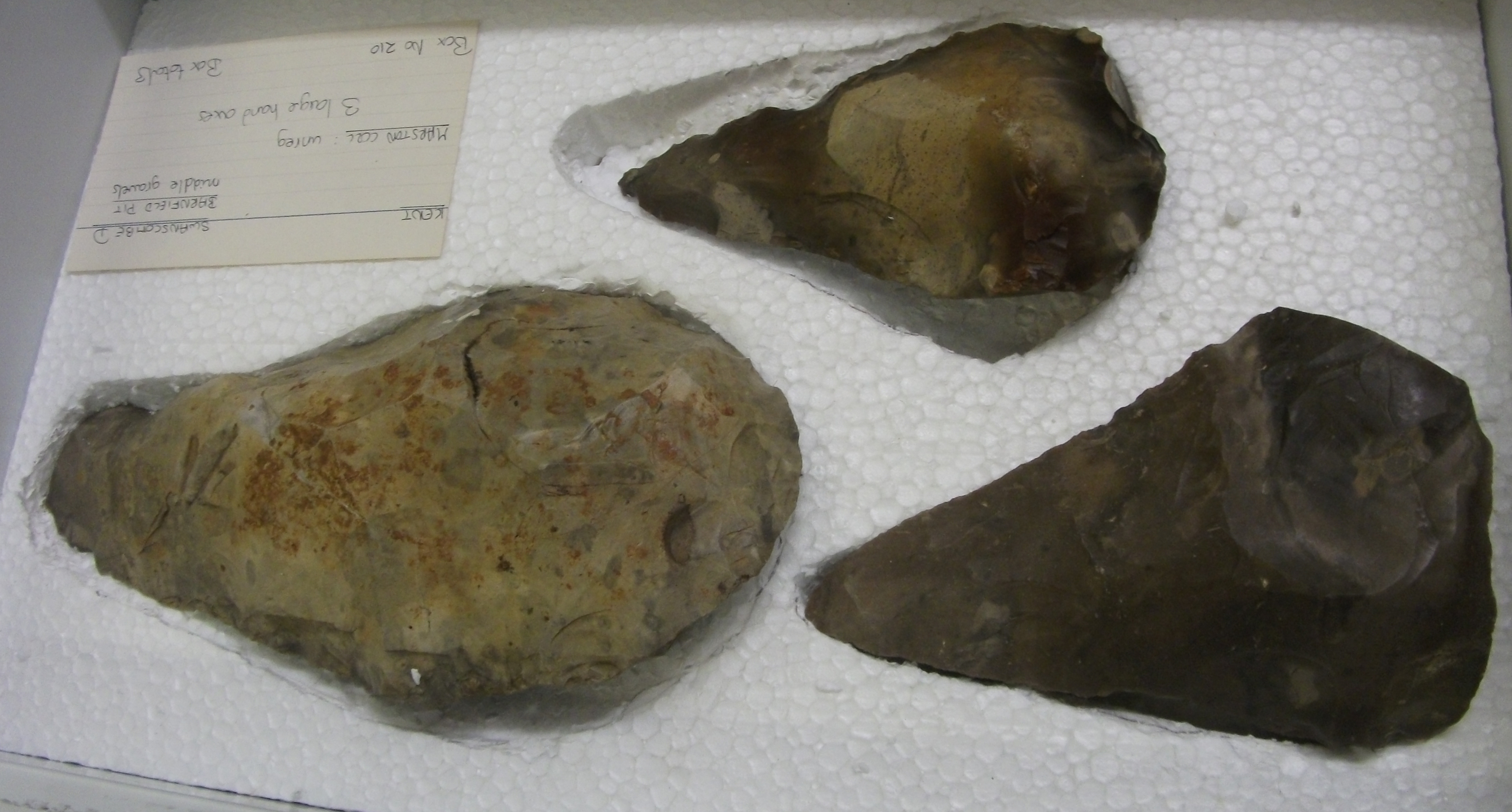
Hand axes found by Marston at Swanscombe in the British Museum (not on display)

A small number (6, representing 1.3% of the total) of the bones found at Swanscombe show evidence of butchery by hominins. The low number of bones with cut marks may be the result of fluvial erosion to the bones prior to their deposition. The site is known for its abundance of stone artifacts, particularly flakes and handaxes. The earliest layers of the site spanning from the Lower Loam to the Lower Gravel, are assigned to the Clactonian industry, found elsewhere in southeast England, which is characterised by their lack of use of handaxes. At the close nearby contemporaneous site of Ebbsfleet, remains of a straight-tusked elephant (dubbed the "Ebbsfleet elephant") have been found with Clactonian stone tools that are thought to have been used to butcher it.

The later layers of the site (from the Lower Middle Gravel to the Upper Gravel, though the Soliflucted Clay and the Upper Sands are barren of archaeological remains) show the presence of an Acheulean industry with handaxes, suggested to represent a second colonisation that replaced the producers of the Clactonian industry. Morphometric analysis suggests there are two chronologically distinct types of handaxes found at Swanscombe, the earlier kind found in the Sequence II layers are generally more teardrop-shaped and have straight edges, while those found in the Sequence III layers generally have a more oval shape and twisted edges.

== "Swanscombe Man" ==
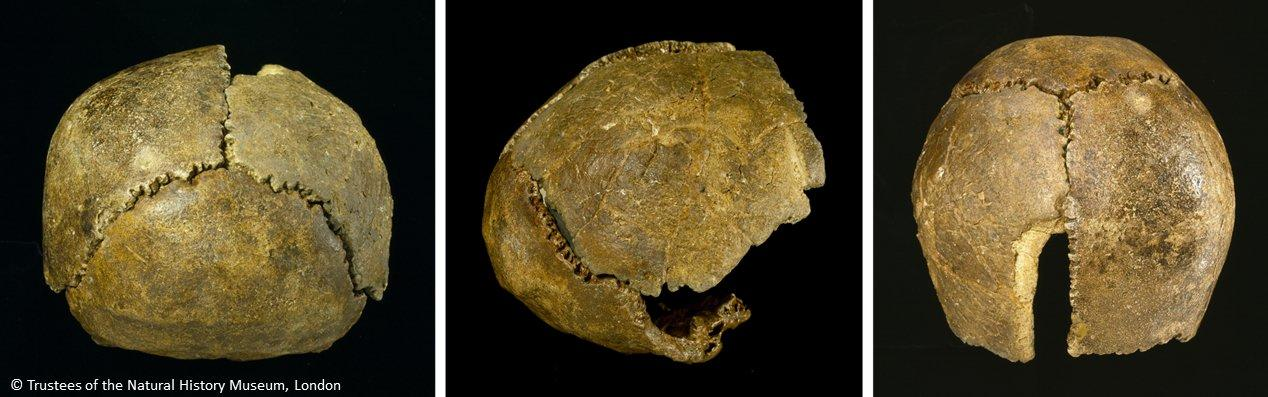
The "Swanscombe skull" in various views

In 1935 and 1936 work at Barnfield Pit by Alvan T. Marston, an amateur archaeologist who visited the pit between quarrying operations to search for flint tools, uncovered two fossilised skull fragments, an occipital and a left parietal, respectively, within the Upper Middle Gravel. In 1955 another part of a skull, a right parietal, was found by John Wymer at a location more than 24 metres (79 ft) away from the other fragments. These fragments interlock in a way that indicates that all three fragments belong to the same skull. These fragments came to be known as the remains of Swanscombe Man, though it is now suggested these remains belonged to a woman. The Swanscombe skull has been identified as early Neanderthal or pre-Neanderthal.

Swanscombe is one of only two sites in Britain that have yielded Lower Paleolithic human fossils, the other being Boxgrove Quarry, West Sussex, where 500,000-year-old leg bones and teeth ("Boxgrove Man") have been found.

== See also ==
- Genetic history of the British Isles
- List of human evolution fossils
- List of prehistoric structures in Great Britain
- Prehistoric Britain
- Clacton spear, oldest known wooden spear, known from contemporaneous sediments of Clacton-on-Sea
- Boxgrove Palaeolithic site
- Swanscombe Peninsula SSSI
