= Clactonian =

Classification of European archaeology

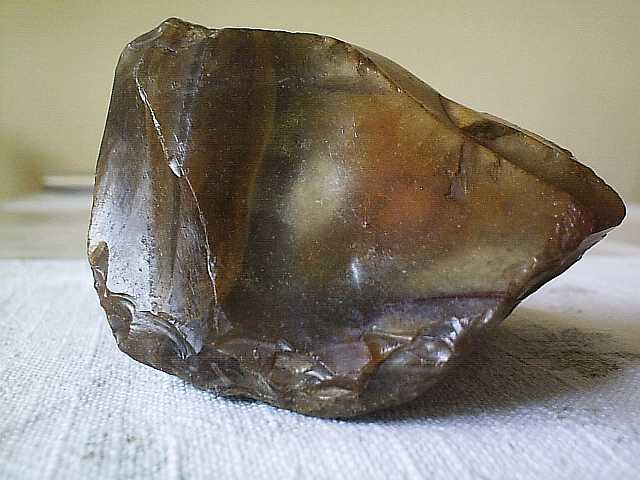
- Clactonian Flake Tool from Rickson’s Farm pit, Swanscombe, Kent, UK.
- Geographical range: England
- Period: Lower Paleolithic
- Dates: c. 424,000 – c. 415,000 BP
- Type site: Clacton-on-Sea
- Major sites: Barnham, Swanscombe Heritage Park
- Preceded by: Acheulean
- Followed by: Mousterian

The Clactonian is the name given by archaeologists to an industry of European flint tool manufacture that dates to the early part of the Hoxnian Interglacial (corresponding to the global Marine Isotope Stage 11 and the continental Holstein Interglacial) around 424–415,000 years ago. Clactonian tools were made by Homo heidelbergensis. The Clactonian is primarily distinguished from the (globally) contemporaneous Acheulean industry by its lack of use of handaxe tools.

It is named after finds made by Samuel Hazzledine Warren in a palaeochannel at Clacton-on-Sea in the English county of Essex in 1911. The artefacts found there included flint chopping tools, flint flakes and the tip of a worked wooden shaft, the Clacton Spear. Further examples of the tools have been found at sites including Barnfield Pit and Rickson's Pit, near Swanscombe in Kent and Barnham in Suffolk; similar industries have been identified across Northern Europe. The Clactonian industry involved striking thick, irregular flakes from a core of flint, which was then employed as a chopper. The flakes would have been used as crude knives or scrapers. Unlike the Oldowan tools, some were notched, implying that they were attached to a handle or shaft. Retouch is uncommon and the prominent bulb of percussion on the flakes indicates use of a hammerstone.

Although in modern literature the term almost exclusively refers to finds in Britain, the term was historically used broadly for finds across much of the Old World. The distinctiveness of the Clactonian industry has been questioned, because its techniques are very similar to those of the Acheulean industry, and the use of handaxes is known in Britain both before (such as at the Boxgrove site) and after the Clactonian.

== Description ==
The Clactonian is described as a "flake and core" industry distinguished from the Acheulean from its lack of use of handaxes. The cores were used as choppers. The shapes of the lithic flakes do not follow a standard pattern. While historically the Clactonian industry was thought to have used stone only to create lithic artefacts, recent evidence has been found supporting the use of animal bones as soft hammers for stone knapping. The wooden Clacton spear, the world's oldest known wooden weapon, has been suggested to be associated with the Clactonian industry.

== History and controversy ==
Map of England showing important sites of the Clactonian industry (clickable map).

The industry was first defined by Samuel Hazzledine Warren in 1926 based on finds at Clacton-on-Sea, England. In the early 20th century, the Clactonian and Acheulean industry were thought to be produced by two different lineages of humans, due to the perceived primitive nature of Clactonian stoneknapping. While some authors in the 1950s connected the Clactonian to the African Oldowan industry, this was later discarded once radiometric dating made it clear that Oldowan was far older than the Clactonian. 1950s authors suggested that the Clactonian may have been ancestral to the Acheulean industry in Britain. While some modern authors have supported this assertion, this has been disputed by other authors, who suggest that end of the Clactonian in Britain and the return of the use of handaxes was the result of a migration of a new population of hominins from the continent replacing the Clactonian producing hominins. It has been suggested by some authors that Clactonian may have originated from populations of hominins in the adjacent Rhineland area, who also did not use handaxes. Some authors have regarded the Clactonian as simply a regional variant of the Acheulean.

== Lifestyle ==
The Clactonian dates to the early part of the Hoxnian Interglacial (which correlates with the mainland European Holstein interglacial and the global Marine Isotope Stage 11), when Britain had a temperate deciduous forest environment and climate similar to that of Britain during the contemporary Holocene period. One of the most important Clactonian sites was found near Ebbsfleet, Kent, where a large straight-tusked elephant (Palaeoloxodon antiquus) skeleton was found associated with Clactonian stone tools, which are suggested to have been used to butcher the elephant. Evidence has also been found for the butchery of the extinct fallow deer species Dama clactoniana using Clactonian tools.

== See also ==
- Acheulean
