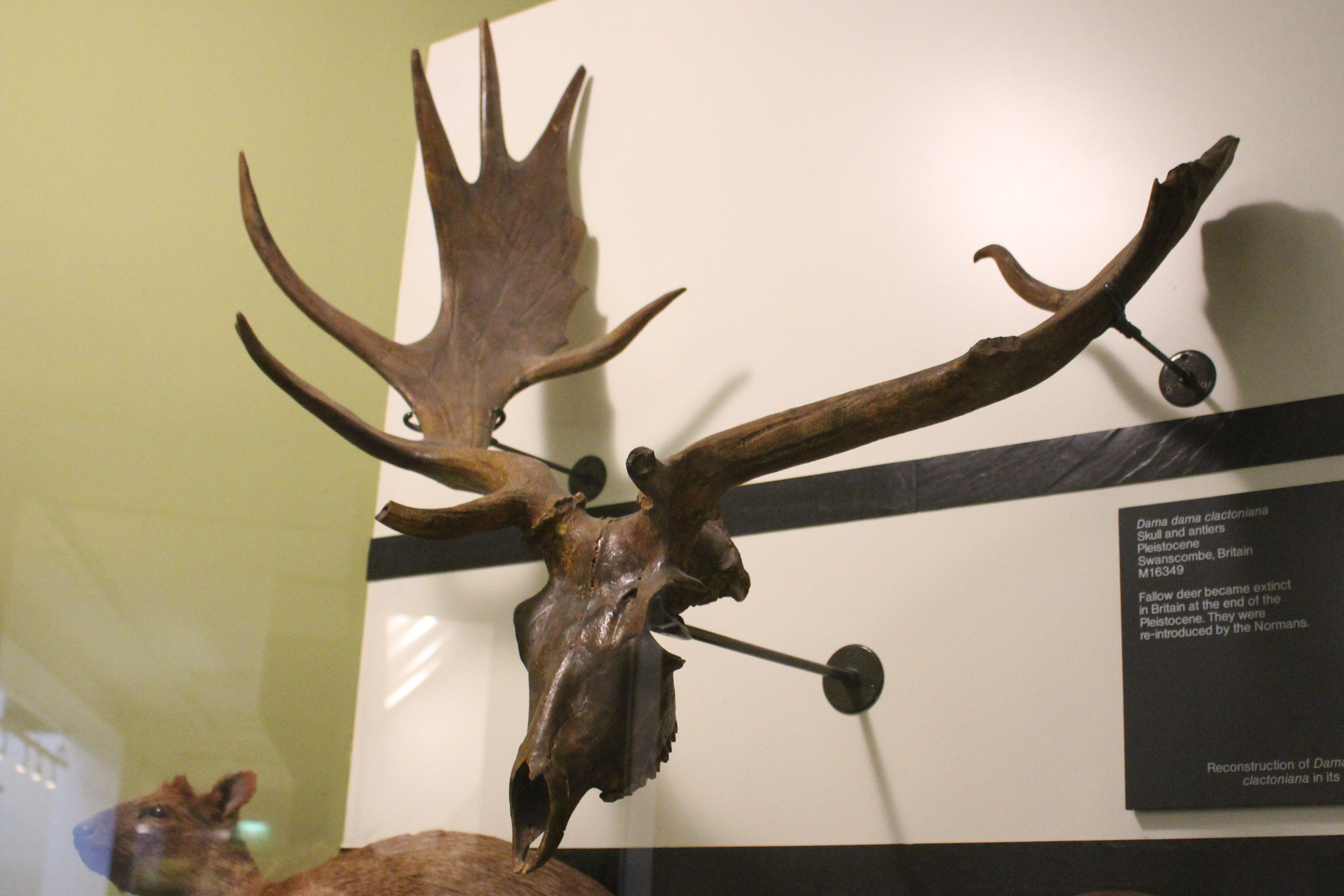

Scientific classification
- Kingdom: Animalia
- Phylum: Chordata
- Class: Mammalia
- Infraclass: Placentalia
- Order: Artiodactyla
- Family: Cervidae
- Genus: Dama
- Species: D. clactoniana

Binomial name
- Dama clactoniana Falconer in Murchison, 1868

= Dama clactoniana =

Dama clactoniana Temporal range: Middle Pleistocene

Extinct species of deer

Dama clactoniana is an extinct species of fallow deer (genus Dama). It lived during the Middle Pleistocene (with fossils spanning around 500-300,000 years ago). It is widely agreed to be the Dama species most closely related and likely ancestral to the two living species of fallow deer (being sometimes treated as a subspecies of Dama dama as Dama dama clactoniana) and like them has palmate antlers.

== Description ==
While the size of the species is variable, recovered specimens of this species tend to be larger than both living fallow deer species on average. Its fourth lower premolar is not molarized. Unlike species of Dama from more primitive lineages or earlier intervals of time, and like living fallow deer, D. clactoniana's antlers are palmate (flattened), with the palmation being narrower than what is seen in antlers of living European fallow deer (Dama dama).

== Distribution ==
Specimens are known from Western Europe, including Italy, Britain, France and Spain.

== Palaeoecology ==
Dental wear analysis of remains from the site of Fontana Aruccio in Italy suggests that D. clactoniana was primarily a browser.

== Relationship with humans ==
Evidence has been found for the butchery Dama clactoniana during the Clactonian period (~424-415,000 years ago) in Britain by Homo heidelbergensis.
