= Middle Pleistocene =

Stage of the Pleistocene Epoch

Middle Pleistocene / Chibanian
- 0.7741 – 0.129 Ma
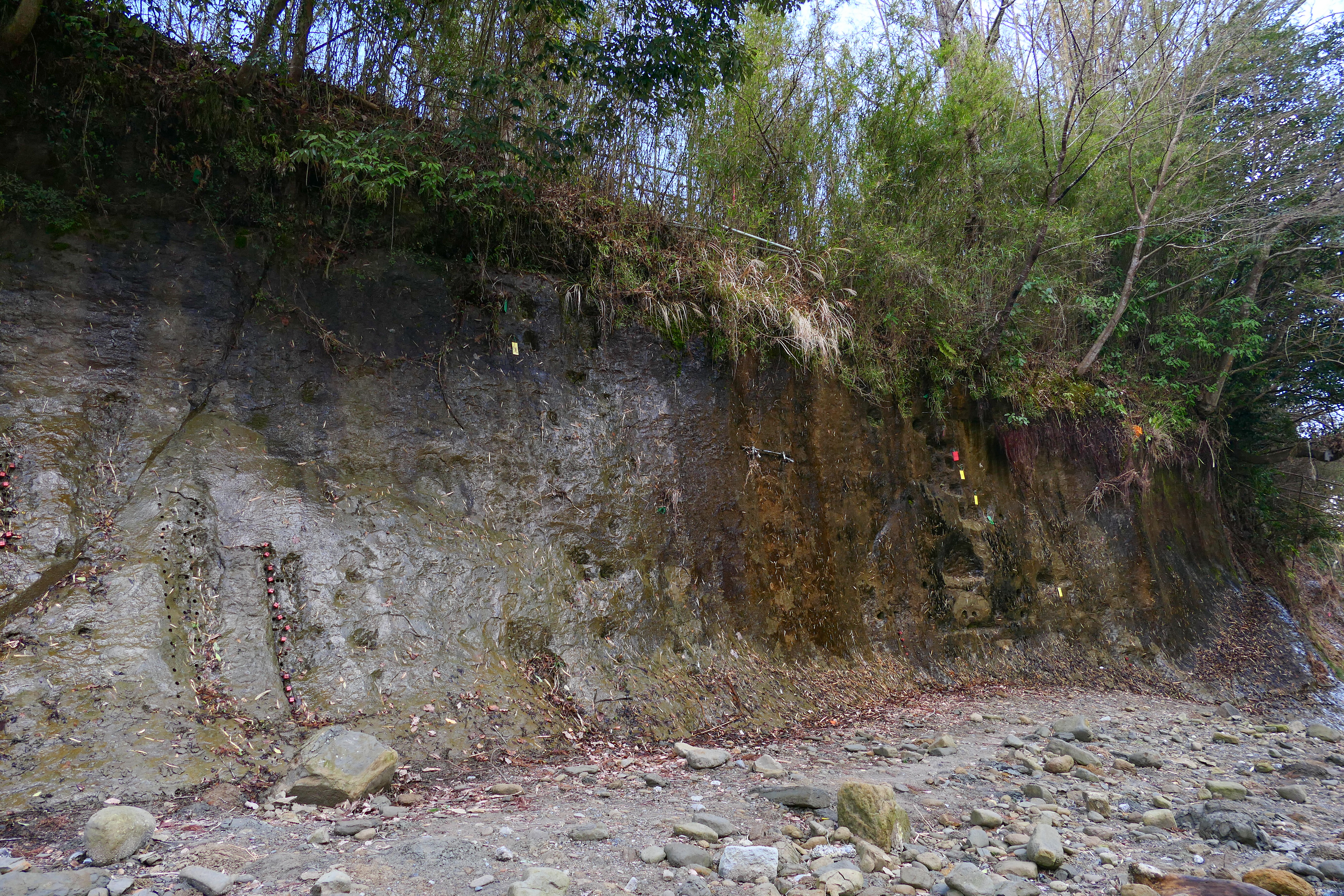
- The Chibanian Stratum, located at the Yoro River near Ichihara City, Japan

Chronology
← / Holocene
Subdivision of the Quaternary according to the ICS, as of 2024. Vertical axis scale: Millions of years ago

Etymology
- Name formality: Formal
- Name ratified: January 2020
- Synonym(s): Middle Pleistocene; Ionian

Usage information
- Celestial body: Earth
- Regional usage: Global (ICS)
- Time scale(s) used: ICS Time Scale

Definition
- Chronological unit: Age
- Stratigraphic unit: Stage
- Time span formality: Formal
- Lower boundary definition: 1.1 m below the directional midpoint of the Brunhes-Matuyama magnetic reversal
- Lower boundary GSSP: Chiba, Japan; 35.2943°N 140.1465°E
- Lower GSSP ratified: January 2020
- Upper boundary definition: Not formally defined
- Upper boundary definition candidates: Marine Isotope Substage 5e
- Upper boundary GSSP candidate section(s): None

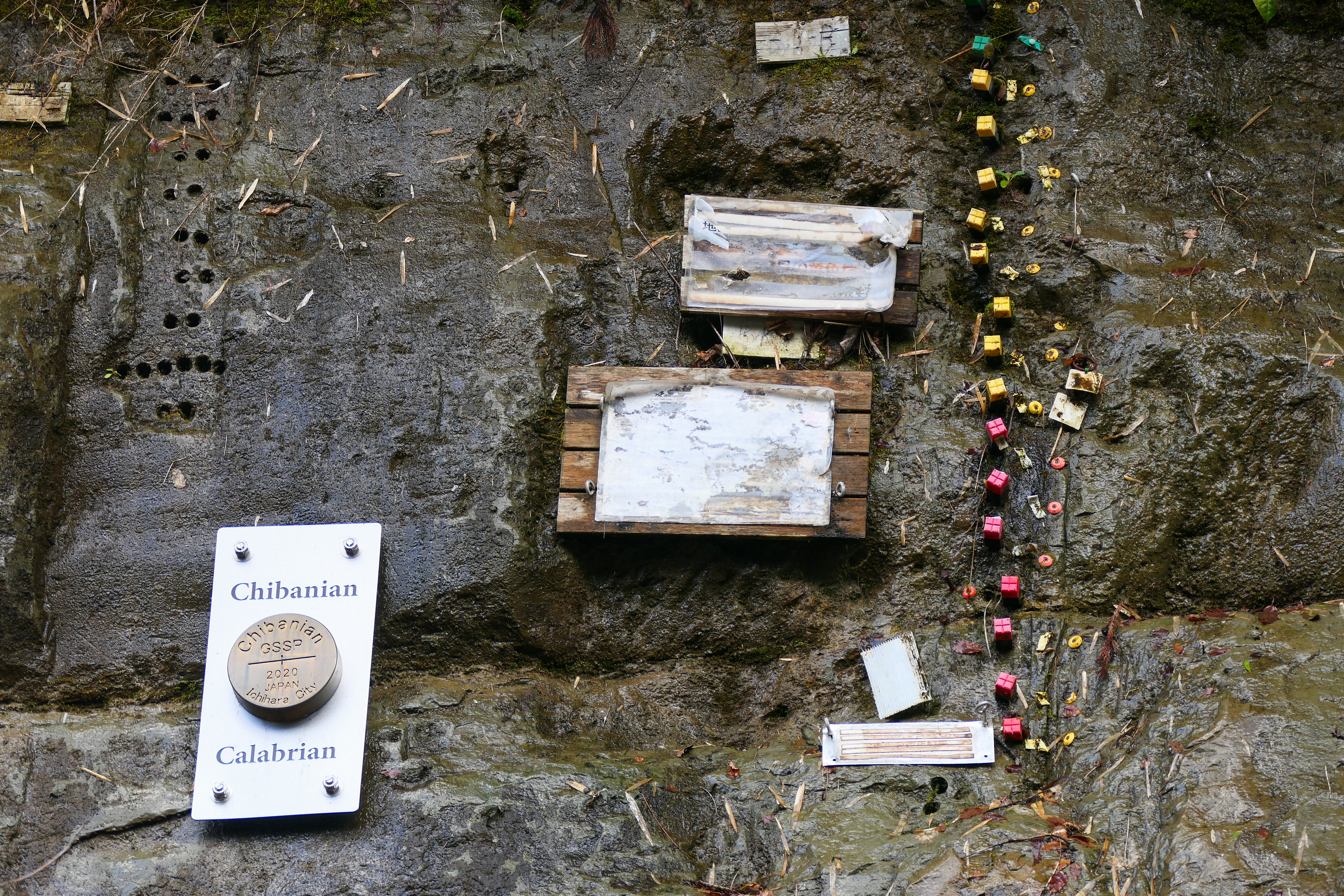
The Chibanian stratum, which dates back to the Chiba period, is located along the Yoro River in Ichihara City, Chiba Prefecture. At the bottom left is a golden spike that marks the boundary between eras. The color-coded stakes on the right mark the boundaries of geological formations, indicating that the Earth's magnetic field was reversing.

The Middle Pleistocene is a subseries of the Pleistocene Epoch in the international geologic timescale. It is equivalent in time to the Chibanian stage. The Chibanian name was officially ratified in January 2020. It is currently estimated to span the time between 0.7741 Ma (774,100 years ago) and 0.129 Ma (129,000 years ago), also expressed as 774.1–129 ka. It includes the transition in palaeoanthropology from the Lower to the Middle Paleolithic over 300 ka.

The Chibanian is preceded by the Calabrian and succeeded by the Late Pleistocene. The beginning of the Chibanian is the Brunhes–Matuyama reversal, when the Earth's magnetic field last underwent reversal. Its end roughly coincides with the termination of the Penultimate Glacial Period and the onset of the Last Interglacial period (corresponding to the beginning of Marine Isotope Stage 5).

The term Middle Pleistocene was in use as a provisional or "quasi-formal" designation by the International Union of Geological Sciences (IUGS), and is now used as a formal subseries. While the three lowest ages of the Pleistocene, the Gelasian, Calabrian and Chibanian have been officially defined, the Late Pleistocene has yet to be formally defined.

== Definition process ==
The International Union of Geological Sciences (IUGS) had previously proposed replacement of the Middle Pleistocene by an Ionian Age based on strata found in Italy. In November 2017, however, the Chibanian (based on strata at a site in Chiba Prefecture, Japan) replaced the Ionian as the Subcommission on Quaternary Stratigraphy's preferred GSSP proposal for the stage/age name of the Middle Pleistocene subseries. The "Chibanian" name was ratified by the IUGS in January 2020.

== Climate ==
By early Middle Pleistocene, the Mid-Pleistocene Transition had changed the glacial cycles from an average 41,000 year periodicity present during most of the Early Pleistocene to a 100,000 year periodicity, with the glacial cycles becoming asymmetric, having long glacial periods punctuated by short warm interglacial periods. Millennial-scale climatic variability continued to be highly sensitive to precession and obliquity cycles.

In central Italy, the climate became noticeably more arid from 600 ka to 400 ka.

The late Middle Pleistocene was a time of regional aridification in the Levant, with a shallow lake covering what is now the Shishan Marsh drying and developing into a marsh.

Eastern Africa's hydroclimate was governed primarily by orbital precession, although modulated significantly by the 100 kyr eccentricity cycle.

Along the northwestern Australian coast, the intensification of the Leeuwin Current resulted in an expansion of reefs coincident with the Great Barrier Reef's formation.

== Events ==
The Early-Middle Pleistocene boundary saw the migration of true horses out of North America and into Eurasia. Also around this time, the European mammoth species Mammuthus meridionalis became extinct and was replaced by the Asian species Mammuthus trogontherii (the steppe mammoth). This was coincident with the migration of the elephant genus Palaeoloxodon out of Africa and into Eurasia, including the first appearance of species like the European straight-tusked elephant (Palaeoloxodon antiquus). With the extinction of Sinomastodon in East Asia at the Early-Middle Pleistocene boundary, gomphotheres became completely extinct in Afro-Eurasia, but continued to persist in the Americas into the Late Pleistocene. There was a major extinction of carnivorous mammals in Europe around the Early-Middle Pleistocene transition, including the giant hyena Pachycrocuta and sabertooth cat Megantereon (though both of these genera persisted later into the Middle Pleistocene in Asia). The mid-late Middle Pleistocene saw the emergence of the woolly mammoth (Mammuthus primigenius), and its replacement of Mammuthus trogontherii, with the replacement of M. trogontherii in Europe by woolly mammoths being complete by around 200,000 years ago. The last member of the notoungulate family Mesotheriidae, Mesotherium, has its last records around 220,000 years ago, leaving Toxodontidae as the sole family of notoungulates to persist into the Late Pleistocene. During the late Middle Pleistocene, around 195,000–135,000 years ago, the steppe bison (the ancestor of the modern American bison) migrated across the Bering land bridge into North America, marking the beginning of the Rancholabrean faunal stage. Around 500,000 years ago, the last members of the largely European aquatic frog genus Palaeobatrachus and by extension the family Palaeobatrachidae became extinct.

== Palaeoanthropology ==
The Chibanian includes the transition in palaeoanthropology from the Lower to the Middle Paleolithic: i.e., the emergence of Homo sapiens sapiens between 300 ka and 400 ka. The oldest known human DNA dates to the Middle Pleistocene, around 430,000 years ago. This is the oldest found, as of 2016.

After analyzing 2,496 remains of Castor fiber (Eurasian beaver) and Trogontherium cuvieri found at Bilzingsleben in Germany, a team of scientists concluded that, around 400 ka, hominids in the area hunted and exploited beavers. They may have been targeted for their meat (based on cut marks on the bones) and skin.

== Chronology ==
Age	paleoclimate	glaciation	palaeoanthropology
790–761 ka	MIS 19	Günz (Elbe) glaciation	Peking Man (Homo erectus)
761–712 ka	MIS 18		
712–676 ka	MIS 17		
676–621 ka	MIS 16		
621–563 ka	MIS 15	Gunz-Haslach interglacial	Heidelberg Man (Homo heidelbergensis), Bodo cranium
563–524 ka	MIS 14		
524–474 ka	MIS 13	end of Cromerian (Günz-Mindel) interglacial	Boxgrove Man (Homo heidelbergensis)
474–424 ka	MIS 12	Anglian Stage in Britain; Haslach glaciation	Tautavel Man (Homo erectus)
424–374 ka	MIS 11	Hoxnian (Britain), Yarmouthian (North America)	Swanscombe Man (Homo heidelbergensis)
374–337 ka	MIS 10	Mindel glaciation, Elster glaciation, Riss glaciation	
337–300 ka	MIS 9	Purfleet Interglacial in Britain	Mousterian
300–243 ka	MIS 8		Irhoud 1 (Homo sapiens); Middle Paleolithic; Haplogroup A (Y-DNA)
243–191 ka	MIS 7	Aveley Interglacial in Britain	Galilee Man; Haua Fteah
191–130 ka	MIS 6	Illinoian Stage	Herto Man (Homo sapiens); Macro-haplogroup L (mtDNA); Mousterian
130–123 ka	MIS 5e	peak of Eemian interglacial sub-stage, or Ipswichian in Britain	Klasies River Caves; Sangoan

== See also ==
- Mid-Pleistocene Transition
- 100,000-year problem
- Pleistocene megafauna
