= Haslach =

Haslach (also spelled Haßlach) is a German word derived from Old High German hasala ("hazel") and aha ("running water"). It may refer to:

Places

- Haslach, a former town in Alsace, France, consisting of modern Niederhaslach and Oberhaslach
- Haslach (Freiburg), part of the city of Freiburg im Breisgau, Germany
- Haslach an der Mühl, a municipality in the Rohrbach district in Austria
- Haslach im Kinzigtal, a municipality in the district Ortenaukreis, Baden-Württemberg, Germany

Rivers

- Haslach (Rot), an eastern tributary to the river Rot in Upper Swabia, Baden-Württemberg, Germany
- Hasslach, a river in Bavaria, Germany

People

- Patricia M. Haslach (born before 1988), U.S. diplomat

Other uses

- Battle of Haslach-Jungingen, fought 1805 at Ulm-Jungingen near the Danube between French and Austrian forces during the War of the Third Coalition
- Gunz-Haslach interglacial, a warm period of the Pleistocene epoch preceding the Haslach glaciation
- Haslach glaciation, a cold period of the Pleistocene epoch
- Haslach-Mindel interglacial, a warm period of the Pleistocene epoch following the Haslach glaciation

== See also ==
- de:Haslach in German Wikipedia, a longer list of places and rivers
- de:Haßlach in German Wikipedia, a longer list of places and rivers
- Niederhaslach, a commune in the Bas-Rhin department in Alsace-Champagne-Ardenne-Lorraine in north-eastern France
- Oberhaslach, a commune in the Bas-Rhin department in Alsace-Champagne-Ardenne-Lorraine in north-eastern France
