= Malcolm Dole =

American chemist (1903–1990)

- Born: March 4, 1903; Melrose, Massachusetts
- Died: November 29, 1990 (aged 87); Los Gatos, California
- Education: Harvard University
- Known for: Dole effect Jones–Dole equation Glass electrodes Polymer crosslinking Electrospray ionization
- Scientific career
- Fields: Physical chemistry Electrochemistry; Polymer chemistry
- Workplaces: Northwestern University; Baylor University
- Thesis: A study of the dissociation of barium chloride in water (1928)
- Doctoral advisor: Theodore William Richards

Malcolm Dole (March 4, 1903 – November 29, 1990) was an American chemist known for the Dole Effect in which he proved that the atomic weight of oxygen in air is greater than that of oxygen in water and for his work on electrospray ionization, polymer chemistry, and electrochemistry.

== Dole effect ==
The Dole effect is the inequality in the ratio of heavy oxygen isotope ^{18}O to the more abundant ^{16}O in the Earth's atmosphere and in seawater. This effect was reported by Dole in 1935. The effect is due to slightly different reaction rates for the two isotopes in respiration in plants and in animals which tends to retain the lighter ^{16}O, which increases the relative concentration of ^{18}O in the atmosphere. The effect has also been linked to hydrologic processes, such as the enrichment of the lighter ^{16}O as water vapor is transported poleward.

== Electrospray ==
Electrospray is a process in which a high voltage is applied to a liquid to create an aerosol containing highly charged droplets. Dole in 1968 was the first to use electrospray ionization with mass spectrometry.

== Books ==
- Dole, Malcolm (1935). Principles of Experimental and Theoretical Electrochemistry. LCCN 35014525.
- Dole, Malcolm (1941). The Glass Electrode: Methods, Applications, and Theory. ASIN B0007DVA2W. LCCN 41016574.
- Dole, Malcolm (1954). Introduction to Statistical Thermodynamics. LCCN 54009934.
- Dole, Malcolm (1972). The Radiation Chemistry of Macromolecules. Boston: Academic Press. ISBN 0-12-219802-6.
- Dole, Malcolm (1989). My Life in the Golden Age of America. New York: Vantage Press. ISBN 0-533-07995-0.
