= Haslach-Mindel interglacial =

The Haslach-Mindel interglacial (German: Haslach-Mindel-Interglazial) and the Haslach-Mindel warm period (Haslach-Mindel-Warmzeit) are historical terms for a hypothetical warm period of the Pleistocene in the Alpine region, between the Haslach and Mindel glacial stages. The interglacial was defined as the erosion phase which follows the Haslach and precedes the Mindel glacial stage. It thus corresponds to the stratigraphic gap between the Haslach beds (Haslacher Schotter) and the Tannheim-Laupheim gravels (Tannheim-Laupheimer Schotter) northeast of the Rhine Glacier.

Modern research has found that the old glacial terms correspond to many glacial cycles, as identified by marine isotope stages (MIS), making the term Haslach-Mindel superfluous. The term is not used in the 2016 version of the detailed stratigraphic table by the German Stratigraphic Commission.

== See also ==
- Timeline of glaciation
