= Mid-Pleistocene Transition =

Change in glacial cycles c. 1m years ago

Five million years of glacial cycles are shown, based on oxygen isotope ratio believed to be a good proxy of global ice volume. The MPT is the transition between the periodicities shown in green.

The Mid-Pleistocene Transition (MPT), also known as the Mid-Pleistocene Revolution (MPR), is a fundamental change in the behaviour of glacial cycles during the Quaternary glaciations. The transition lasted around 550,000 years, from 1.25 million years ago until 0.7 million years ago approximately, in the Pleistocene epoch.

== Background ==
Before the MPT, the glacial cycles were dominated by a 41,000-year periodicity with low-amplitude, thin ice sheets, and a linear relationship to the Milankovitch forcing from axial tilt. Because of this, sheets were more dynamic during the Early Pleistocene. After the MPT there have been strongly asymmetric cycles with long-duration cooling of the climate and build-up of thick ice sheets, followed by a fast change from extreme glacial conditions to a warm interglacial. This led to less dynamic ice sheets. Interglacials before the MPT had lower levels of atmospheric carbon dioxide compared to interglacials after the MPT. One of the MPT's effects was causing ice sheets to become higher in altitude and less slippery compared to before. The MPT greatly increased the reservoirs of hydrocarbons locked up as permafrost methane or methane clathrate during glacial intervals. This led to larger methane releases during deglaciations. The cycle lengths have varied, with an average length of approximately 100,000 years.

== Regional effects ==
=== Americas ===
In Alaska, the MPT caused a net mass loss in the Saint Elias Mountains because the plate tectonic input of mass into this mountain range became exceeded by mass loss from glacial erosion. The Loop Current decreased in strength, contributing to the cooling of the Northern Hemisphere.

=== Europe ===
In Europe, the MPT was associated with the Epivillafranchian-Galerian transition and may have led to the local extinction of, among other taxa, Puma pardoides, Megantereon whitei, and Xenocyon lycaonoides. The prevalence of ungulates adapted for grazing increased in the Mediterranean region after the "0.9 Ma event". The northern North Sea Basin was first glaciated during the MPT. The increased intensity of transgressive-regressive cycles is recorded in northern Italy.

=== Asia ===
The cooling brought about by the MPT increased westerly aridity in the western Tarim Basin. East Asian Summer Monsoon (EASM) precipitation declined. Grasslands expanded across the North China Plain as forests contracted.

During the MPT, the Indian Summer Monsoon (ISM) decreased in strength. In the middle of the MPT, there was a sudden decrease in denitrification, likely due to increased solubility of oxygen during lengthened glacial periods. After the MPT, the Bay of Bengal experienced increased stratification as a result of the strengthening of the ISM, which resulted in increased riverine flux, inhibiting mixing and creating a shallow thermocline, with stratification being stronger during interstadials than stadials. Paradoxically, variability in Δδ^{18}O in the Bay of Bengal between glacials and interglacials decreased following the MPT.

=== Africa ===
In Central Africa, detectable floral changes corresponding to glacial cycles were absent prior to the MPT. Following the MPT, a clear cyclicity became evident, with interglacials being characterised by warm and dry conditions while glacials were cool and humid.

=== Oceania ===
In Australia, the MPT resulted in the formation of the dunes of Fraser Island and the Cooloola Sand Mass. The increasing amplitude of sea level variations led to increased redistribution of sediments stored on the seafloor across the continental shelf. The development of Fraser Island indirectly led to the formation of the Great Barrier Reef by drastically decreasing the flow of sediment to the area of continental shelf north of Fraser Island, a necessary precondition for the growth of coral reefs on such an enormous scale as found in the Great Barrier Reef.

The MPT occurred amidst a longer-term cooling trend in sea surface temperatures (SSTs). In the Eastern Equatorial Pacific (EEP), denitrification increased during interglacials while decreasing during glacials. Deep water coral growth in the Maui Nui Complex was enhanced by the high amplitude glacial cycles brought about by the MPT, while Acropora disappeared from this reef complex. Benthic foraminiferal diversity in the EEP dropped.

=== Arctic Ocean ===
A major faunal turnover occurred among Arctic Ocean ostracods and benthic and planktonic foraminifera.

== Modeling and explanation ==
The MPT was long a problem to explain, as described in the article 100,000-year problem. The MPT can now be reproduced by numerical models that assume a decreasing level of atmospheric carbon dioxide, a high sensitivity to this decrease, and gradual removal of regoliths from northern hemisphere areas subject to glacial processes during the Quaternary. The reduction in CO_{2} may be related to changes in volcanic outgassing, the burial of ocean sediments, carbonate weathering or iron fertilization of oceans from glacially induced dust.

Regoliths are believed to affect glaciation because ice with its base on regolith at the pressure melting point will slide with relative ease, which limits the thickness of the ice sheet. Before the Quaternary, northern North America and northern Eurasia are believed to have been covered by thick layers of regoliths, which have been worn away over large areas by subsequent glaciations. Later glaciations were increasingly based on core areas, with thick ice sheets strongly coupled to bare bedrock. Osmium isotope evidence suggests that a major change in chemical weathering flux into the oceans took place during the MPT, consistent with the regolith hypothesis.

It has also been proposed that an enlarged deep ocean carbon inventory in the Atlantic Ocean played a role in the increase in amplitude of glacial-interglacial cycles because this increase in carbon storage capacity is coincident with the transition from 41-kyr to 100-kyr glacial-interglacial cycles.

A 2023 study formulates an innovative hypothesis on the origin of the MPT (obliquity damping hypothesis). This hypothesis is based on the observational evidence of obliquity damping in climate proxies and sea-level record during the Last 1.2 Ma. Obliquity damping is linked with short eccentricity amplification which appears as a missing-link for the MPT. The study hypothesises that both the glacio-eustatic water mass component in the obliquity band may controlled the Earth's oblateness changes and the obliquity phase lag estimated to be <5.0 kyr, explain obliquity's damping by the obliquity-oblateness feedback as latent physical mechanism at the origin of the MPT. The obliquity damping might have contributed to the strengthening of the short eccentricity response by mitigating the obliquity 'ice killing' during obliquity maxima (interglacials), favouring the obliquity-cycle skipping and a feedback-amplified ice growth in the short eccentricity band.

However, a 2020 study concluded that ice age terminations might have been influenced by obliquity since the MPT, which caused stronger summers in the Northern Hemisphere. Evidence suggests that fluctuations in the volume of the West Antarctic Ice Sheet continued to be governed dominantly by fluctuations in obliquity until about 400,000 years ago.

== See also ==
- 100,000-year problem
- Chibanian
- Milankovitch cycles
- Paleoclimatology
- Paleothermometer
- Timeline of glaciation
