= Jones–Dole equation =

The Jones–Dole equation, or Jones–Dole expression, is an empirical expression that describes the relationship between the viscosity of a solution and the concentration of solute within the solution (at a fixed temperature and pressure). The Jones–Dole equation is written as
$$\frac{\eta}{\eta_0} = 1 + A C^\frac{1}{2} + B C,$$
where

η is the viscosity of the solution (at a fixed temperature and pressure),
η_{0} is the viscosity of the solvent at the same temperature and pressure,
A is a coefficient that describes the impact of charge–charge interactions on the viscosity of a solution (it is usually positive) and can be calculated from Debye–Hückel theory,
B is a coefficient that characterises the solute–solvent interactions at a defined temperature and pressure,
C is the solute concentration.

The Jones–Dole B coefficient is often used to classify ions as either structure-makers (kosmotropes) or structure-breakers (chaotropes) according to their supposed strengthening or weakening of the hydrogen-bond network of water. The Jones–Dole expression works well up to about 1 M, but at higher concentrations breaks down, as the viscosity of all solutions increase rapidly at high concentrations.

The large increase in viscosity as a function of solute concentration seen in all solutions above about 1 M is the effect of a jamming transition at a high concentration. As a result, the viscosity increases exponentially as a function of concentration and then diverges at a critical concentration. This has been referred to as the "Mayonnaise effect", as the viscosity of mayonnaise (essentially a solution of oil in water) is extremely high because of the jamming of micrometer-scale droplets.
