= Kansan glaciation =

Glacial stage

The Kansan glaciation or Kansan glacial (see Pre-Illinoian) was a glacial stage and part of an early conceptual climatic and chronological framework composed of four glacial and interglacial stages.

== History ==
Kansan glaciation was used by early geomorphologists and Quaternary geologists to subdivide glacial and nonglacial deposits within north-central United States from youngest to oldest and are as follows:

- Wisconsin (glacial)
- Sangamonian (interglacial)
- Illinoian (glacial)
- Yarmouthian (interglacial)
- Kansan (glacial)
- Aftonian (interglacial)
- Nebraskan (glacial)

As developed between 1894 and 1909, the Kansan Stage was based on a model that assumed that the Pleistocene deposits contained only two glacial tills and one volcanic ash bed within Nebraska and Kansas. Of these two proposed glacial tills, the Kansan till, which defined the Kansan Stage, was the upper of the two glacial tills and the Nebraskan till, which defined the Nebraskan Stage, was the lower of the two glacial tills. It was argued that a single paleosol developed in the Nebraskan till and interglacial deposits separated the Kansan and Nebraskan tills. The paleosol and deposits were used to define the Aftonian (interglacial) stage that separated the Kansan and Nebraskan stages.

In time, the stratigraphy of Pleistocene deposits was found to be far more complex than the two glacial tills and one volcanic ash bed on which the Yarmouthian, Kansan, Nebraskan, and Aftonian glacial – interglacial nomenclature was originally based. Detailed research by Boellstorff demonstrated that the two glacial tills and one ash bed stratigraphic model, on which the Yarmouthian, Kansan, Nebraskan, and Aftonian glacial – interglacial nomenclature was based, was completely wrong. This research found that at the type locations for the Kansan and Nebraskan tills numerous glacial tills, which were separated by numerous paleosols, existed. In addition, fission track dating and geochemical analysis demonstrated what was thought to be one volcanic ash layer was actually three separate volcanic ash layers, i.e. the 602,000 year-old Lava Creek B volcanic ash; the 1,293,000 year-old Mesa Falls volcanic ash, and the 2,003,000 year-old Huckleberry volcanic ash. In addition, detailed studies of glacial tills in Kansas have found that at different outcrops, the same glacial till has been identified as being either a "Kansan" till or "Nebraskan" till. Also, it was found that the Afton Soil (paleosol), which was used define the Aftonian interglacial, is buried by a younger glacial till that was considered to be a "type Nebraskan" glacial till as well as having developed in an older glacial till that was considered to be a "type Nebraskan" glacial till. As a result, the basic assumptions on which the Yarmouthian (interglacial), Kansan (glacial), Aftonian (interglacial), and Nebraskan (glacial) nomenclature was originally defined was found to be lacking any scientific basis. As a result, this nomenclature was abandoned by Quaternary geologists in North America and merged into the Pre-Illinoian Stage.

== See also ==
- Glacial history of Minnesota
- Ice age
- Illinoian Stage
- Last Glacial Maximum
- Pre-Illinoian Stage
- Sea level rise
- Timeline of glaciation
- Yarmouthian Interglacial
