= Haslach glaciation =

The Haslach glaciation (German: Haslach-Kaltzeit), Haslach Glacial Stage (Haslach-Glazial), Haslach Complex (Haslach-Komplex) and Haslach Ice Age (Haslach-Eiszeit) are historical terms for a cold period of the Pleistocene epoch. Haslach was not included in the traditional glacial schema of the Alps by Albrecht Penck and Eduard Brückner. The glacial stage was first described around 1981 by A. Schreiner and R. Ebel. Its type region is the Haslach Gravels (Haslach-Schotter) in the area of the Riss-Iller-Lech Plateau. The Haslach cold period was thought to be preceded by the Günz-Haslach interglacial and followed by the Haslach-Mindel Interglacial.

The name Haslach is absent from the 2016 version of the detailed stratigraphic table by the German Stratigraphic Commission.

== See also ==
- Timeline of glaciation

== Literature ==
- K.A. Habbe; D. Ellwanger; R. Becker-Haumann (2007), "Stratigraphische Begriffe für das Quartär des süddeutschen Alpenvorlandes", Eiszeitalter und Gegenwart Quaternary Science Journal (in German), 56 (1/2): 66–83, doi:10.3285/eg.56.1-2.03, hdl:11858/00-1735-0000-0001-B9FE-0, ISSN 0424-7116
- T. Litt; et al. (2005), "Das Quartär in der Stratigraphischen Tabelle von Deutschland 2002", Newsletters in Stratigraphie (in German), vol. 41, no. 1–3, Berlin, Stuttgart, pp. 385–399. "Text" (PDF). Archived from the original (PDF) on 2010-02-16. "Table" (PDF). Archived from the original (PDF) on 2010-02-16.
