= Dole effect =

The Dole effect, named after Malcolm Dole, describes an inequality in the ratio of the heavy isotope ^{18}O (a "standard" oxygen atom with two additional neutrons) to the lighter ^{16}O, measured in the atmosphere and seawater. This ratio is usually denoted δ^{18}O.

It was noticed in 1935 that air contained more ^{18}O than seawater; this was quantified in 1975 to 23.5‰, but later refined as 23.88‰ in 2005. The imbalance arises mainly as a result of respiration in plants and in animals. Due to thermodynamics of isotope reactions, respiration removes the lighter—hence more reactive—^{16}O in preference to ^{18}O, increasing the relative amount of ^{18}O in the atmosphere.

The inequality is balanced by photosynthesis. Photosynthesis emits oxygen with the same isotopic composition (i.e. the ratio between ^{18}O and ^{16}O) as the water (H_{2}O) used in the reaction, which is independent of the atmospheric ratio. Thus when atmospheric ^{18}O levels are high enough, photosynthesis will act as a reducing factor. However, as a complicating factor, the degree of fractionation (i.e. change in isotope ratio) occurring due to photosynthesis is not entirely dependent on the water drawn up by the plant, as fractionation can occur as a result of preferential evaporation of H_{2}^{16}O - water bearing lighter oxygen isotopes, and other small but significant processes.

== Use of the Dole effect ==
Since evaporation causes oceanic and terrestrial waters to have a different ratio of ^{18}O to ^{16}O, the Dole effect will reflect the relevant importances of land-based and marine photosynthesis. The complete removal of land-based productivity would result in a Dole effect shift of -2-3‰ from the current value of 23.5‰.

The stability (to within 0.5‰) of the atmospheric ^{18}O to ^{16}O ratio with respect to sea surface waters since the last interglacial (the last 130 000 years), as derived from ice cores, suggests that terrestrial and marine productivity have varied together during this time period.

Millennial variations of the Dole effect were found to be related to abrupt climate change events in the North Atlantic region during the last 60 kyr (1kyr=1000years). High correlations of the Dole effect to speleothem δ^{18}O, an indicator for monsoon precipitation, suggest that it is subject to changes in low-latitude terrestrial productivity. Orbital scale variations of the Dole effect, characterized by periods of 20-100 kyr, respond strongly to Earth's orbital eccentricity and precession, but not obliquity.

The Dole effect can also be applied as a tracer in sea water, with slight variations in chemistry being used to track a discrete "parcel" of water and determine its age.

== See also ==
- Isotopes of oxygen
