= Gunz-Haslach interglacial =

The Gunz-Haslach interglacial (German: Günz-Haslach-Interglazial) and the Gunz-Haslach warm period (Günz-Haslach-Warmzeit) are historical terms for a hypothetical warm period of the Pleistocene in the Alpine region, between the Gunz and Haslach glaciations. The interglacial was defined as the erosion phase which follows the Günz and precedes the Haslach Glacial Stage. It thus corresponds to the stratigraphic gap between the Zeil gravels (Zeiler Schotter) in Swabia and Haslach gravels (Haslacher Schotter) northeast of the Rhine Glacier.

Modern research has found that the old glacial terms correspond to many glacial cycles, as identified by marine isotope stages (MIS), making the term Gunz-Haslach superfluous. The term is not used in the 2016 version of the detailed stratigraphic table by the German Stratigraphic Commission.

== See also ==
- Timeline of glaciation
