= Yarmouthian (stage) =

Obsolete geologic period of the early Quaternary of North America

The Yarmouthian stage and the Yarmouth Interglacial were part of a now-obsolete geologic timescale of the early Quaternary of North America.

== Development ==
This climatic and chronological framework was composed of four glacial and interglacial stages. It was developed between 1894 and 1909 by geomorphologists and Quaternary geologists to subdivide glacial and nonglacial deposits within the United States of America. From youngest to oldest, they were the Wisconsinian Stage (glacial), Sangamonian (interglacial), Illinoian (glacial), Yarmouthian (interglacial), Kansan (glacial), Aftonian (interglacial), and Nebraskan (glacial) stages.

The Yarmouthian (Yarmouth) Interglacial was defined first on the basis of "interglacial" sediments encountered in wells dug in southeastern Iowa. Later, the Yarmouth (Yarmouthian) stage in Illinois was defined on the basis of the Yarmouth Paleosol (Soil), developed in the surface of what were thought at that time to be "Kansan" glacial tills, and buried by Illionian glacial tills of the Glasford Formation in southeast Iowa and east-central Illinois. At this time, it was incorrectly presumed that the Yarmouth Paleosol formed during a single interglacial stage, which separated a younger glacial stage, the Illinoian Glaciation represented by the sediments of the Glasford Formation in Illinois, and the glacial deposits of an older glacial stage called the "Kansan Glaciation".

== Conflicts ==
Since the Yarmouthian (Yarmouth) interglacial was named, the stratigraphy of Pleistocene deposits was found to be far more complex than the two glacial tills and one volcanic ash bed on which the Yarmouthian, Kansan, Nebraskan, and Aftonian glacial - interglacial nomenclature was originally based. Detailed research by various geomorphologists and Quaternary geologists demonstrated that the two glacial tills and one ash bed stratigraphic model, on which the Yarmouthian, Kansan, Nebraskan, and Aftonian glacial - interglacial nomenclature was based, was completely wrong. For example, the so-called "Kansan" glacial sediments in which the Yarmouth Soil developed are now known to date to different periods of glaciation depending on where it is examined within the Midwest and other parts of North America. In addition, fission track dating and geochemical analysis demonstrated what was thought to be one volcanic ash layer was actually three separate volcanic ash layers, i.e. the 602,000 year-old Lava Creek B volcanic ash; the 1,293,000 year-old Mesa Falls volcanic ash, and the 2,003,000 year-old Huckleberry volcanic ash.

Thus, the basic assumptions, on which the Yarmouthian (interglacial), Kansan (glacial), Aftonian (interglacial), and Nebraskan (glacial) nomenclature was originally defined was found to be lacking any scientific basis. As a result, the Yarmouthian (interglacial), Kansan (glacial), Aftonian (interglacial), and Nebraskan (glacial) nomenclature was abandoned by Quaternary geologists North America and merged into the Pre-Illinoian Stage.

== Reassessment ==
Because of the flaws with the early conceptual climatic and chronological framework for Midwestern glacial - interglaciations, the Yarmouthian (Yarmouth) Interglacial (Stage) completely lacks any meaning or usefulness in North American glacial - interglacial nomenclature.

First, the incorrect presumption that there was only one major ash bed within the Midwestern United States lead to the misclassification of Middle to Early Pleistocene interglacial deposits containing the 602,000 year-old Lava Creek B volcanic ash; the 1,293,000 year-old Mesa Falls volcanic ash, and the 2,003,000 year-old Huckleberry volcanic ash as being the same age. Because it was thought that there was only one significant ash bed, not three of them, any nonglacial deposit containing an ash bed, regardless of its true age, were thought to be the same age. As a result, the nonglacial deposits attributed in the scientific literature as dating to the Yarmouthian (Yarmouth) Interglacial (Stage) consist of an assemblage of sediments deposited during a number of differing interglacial periods, including some dating to 0.60, 1.22, and 2.02 million years ago. An additional problem is that recent research demonstrates that the glacial tills, the Glasford Formation, of the Illinoian Stage are limited in age to Marine Isotope Stage 6. Thus, within Illinois and adjacent parts of Iowa, the Yarmouth Soil (paleosol), which defines the Yarmouthian (Yarmouth) Interglacial (Stage) in Illinois, spans a period of geologic time equivalent to Marine Isotope stages 7, 8, 9, 10, and 11. Elsewhere in North America, as in Illinois, the Yarmouth Soil also has developed over a variable number of multiple glacial - interglacial cycles. Thus, the presumption that the Yarmouth Soil, by which the Yarmouthian (Yarmouth) Interglacial was later defined, represents a single interglacial stage or period has been completely discredited.

Also, the "interglacial" deposits used by Leverett to originally define the Yarmouthian (Yarmouth) Interglacial in 1898 actually consist of interbedded glacial tills, diamictons, peats, sands, and silts, that are part of the Kellerville Till Member of the Glasford Formation. Pollen samples and wood recovered from these deposits indicate that the vegetation consisted of a Picea-Larix forest and that climate was full-glacial rather than interglacial during their accumulation. Thus, the criteria, i.e. (1.) its sediments being all of the same age, (2.) it consisting of sediments deposited during a single interglacial period, and (3,) as originally defined by Leverett in 1898 consist of interglacial sediments, by which the Yarmouthian (Yarmouth) Interglacial (Stage) was defined and recognized have all been found to be false.

== See also ==
- Ice age
- Glacial period
- Last glacial period
- Timeline of glaciation
