= Pleistocene =

First epoch of the Quaternary Period

- 2.58 – 0.0117 Ma
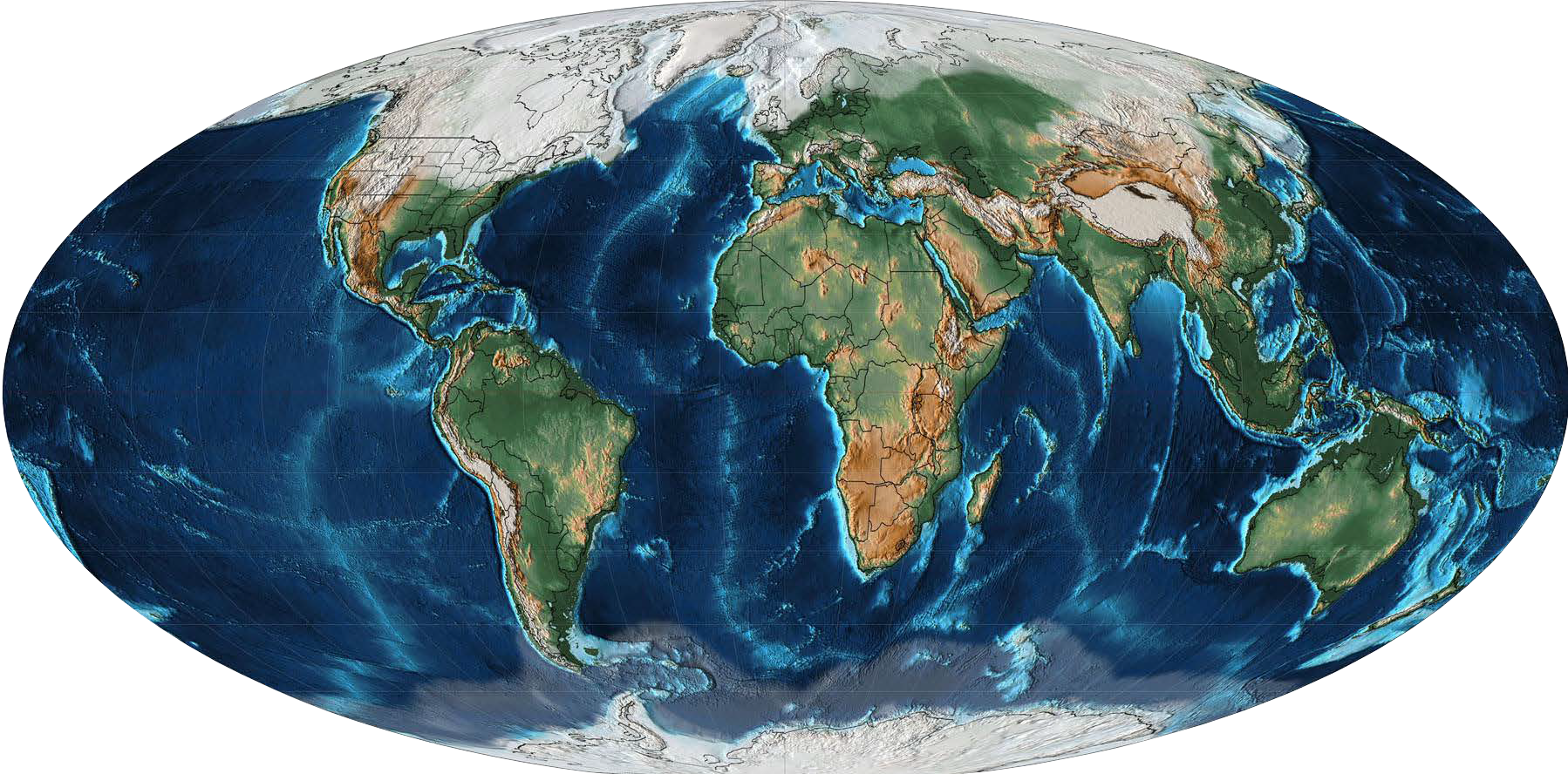
- A map of Earth as it appeared approximately 21,000 years ago at the peak of the Last Glacial Maximum during the Late Pleistocene

Chronology
← / Holocene
Subdivision of the Quaternary according to the ICS, as of 2024. Vertical axis scale: Millions of years ago

Etymology
- Name formality: Formal

Usage information
- Celestial body: Earth
- Regional usage: Global (ICS)

Definition
- Chronological unit: Epoch
- Stratigraphic unit: Series
- Time span formality: Formal
- Lower boundary definition: Base of magnetic polarity chronozone C2r (Matuyama).; Extinction of the haptophytes Discoaster pentaradiatus and Discoaster surculus
- Lower boundary GSSP: Monte San Nicola Section, Gela, Sicily, Italy; 37.1469°N 14.2035°E
- Lower GSSP ratified: 2009 (as base of Quaternary and Pleistocene)
- Upper boundary definition: End of the Younger Dryas stadial
- Upper boundary GSSP: NGRIP2 ice core, Greenland; 75.1000°N 42.3200°W
- Upper GSSP ratified: 2008 (as base of Holocene)

The Pleistocene (/ˈplaɪstəˌsiːn, -stoʊ-/ PLY-stə-seen, -stoh-) is the geological epoch that lasted from c. 2.58 million to 11,700 years ago, spanning the Earth's most recent period of repeated glaciations. Before a change was finally confirmed in 2009 by the International Union of Geological Sciences, the cutoff of the Pleistocene and the preceding Pliocene was regarded as being 1.806 million years Before Present (BP). Publications from earlier years may use either definition of the period. The end of the Pleistocene corresponds with the end of the last glacial period and also with the end of the Paleolithic age used in archaeology. The name comes from Ancient Greek πλεῖστος (pleîstos), meaning "most", and καινός (kainós), meaning "new, recent".

The aridification and cooling trends of the preceding Neogene were continued in the Pleistocene. The climate was highly variable depending on the glacial cycle, oscillating between cold glacial periods and warmer interglacials, with sea levels dropping at peak glaciation by as much 120 metres (390 ft) lower than present, allowing the periodic connection of Asia and North America via the Beringia land bridge, and the covering of most of northern North America by the large Laurentide Ice Sheet.

At the end of the preceding Pliocene, the previously isolated North and South American continents were joined by the Isthmus of Panama, causing a faunal interchange between the two regions and changing ocean circulation patterns, with the onset of glaciation in the Northern Hemisphere occurring around 2.7 million years ago. During the Early Pleistocene (2.58–0.8 Ma), archaic humans of the genus Homo originated in Africa and spread throughout Afro-Eurasia. The end of the Early Pleistocene is marked by the Mid-Pleistocene Transition, with the cyclicity of glacial cycles changing from 41,000-year cycles to asymmetric 100,000-year cycles, making the climate variation more extreme. The Late Pleistocene witnessed the spread of modern humans outside Africa as well as the extinction of all other human species. Humans also spread to the Australian continent and the Americas for the first time.

The Late Pleistocene from around 50,000 years ago was marked by the extinction of most large terrestrial animals outside Africa, an extinction event otherwise unprecedented in the geological record due to its extreme size bias. Most authors suggest that climate change, the expansion of modern humans, or the combination of both were the likely causes of the extinctions.

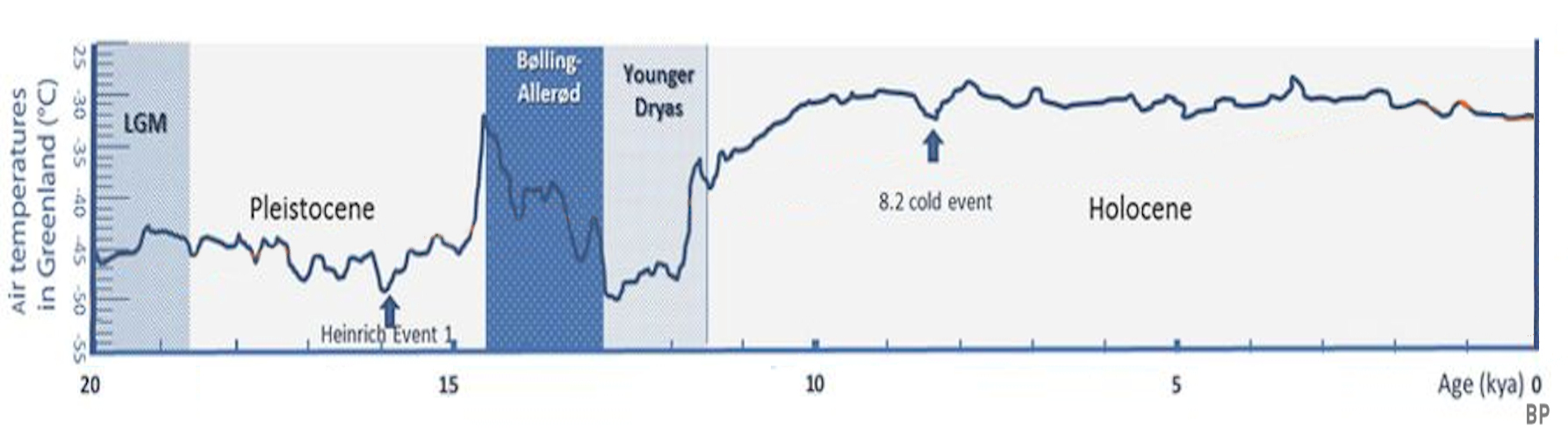
Evolution of temperature in the Post-Glacial period at the very end of the Pleistocene, according to Greenland ice cores

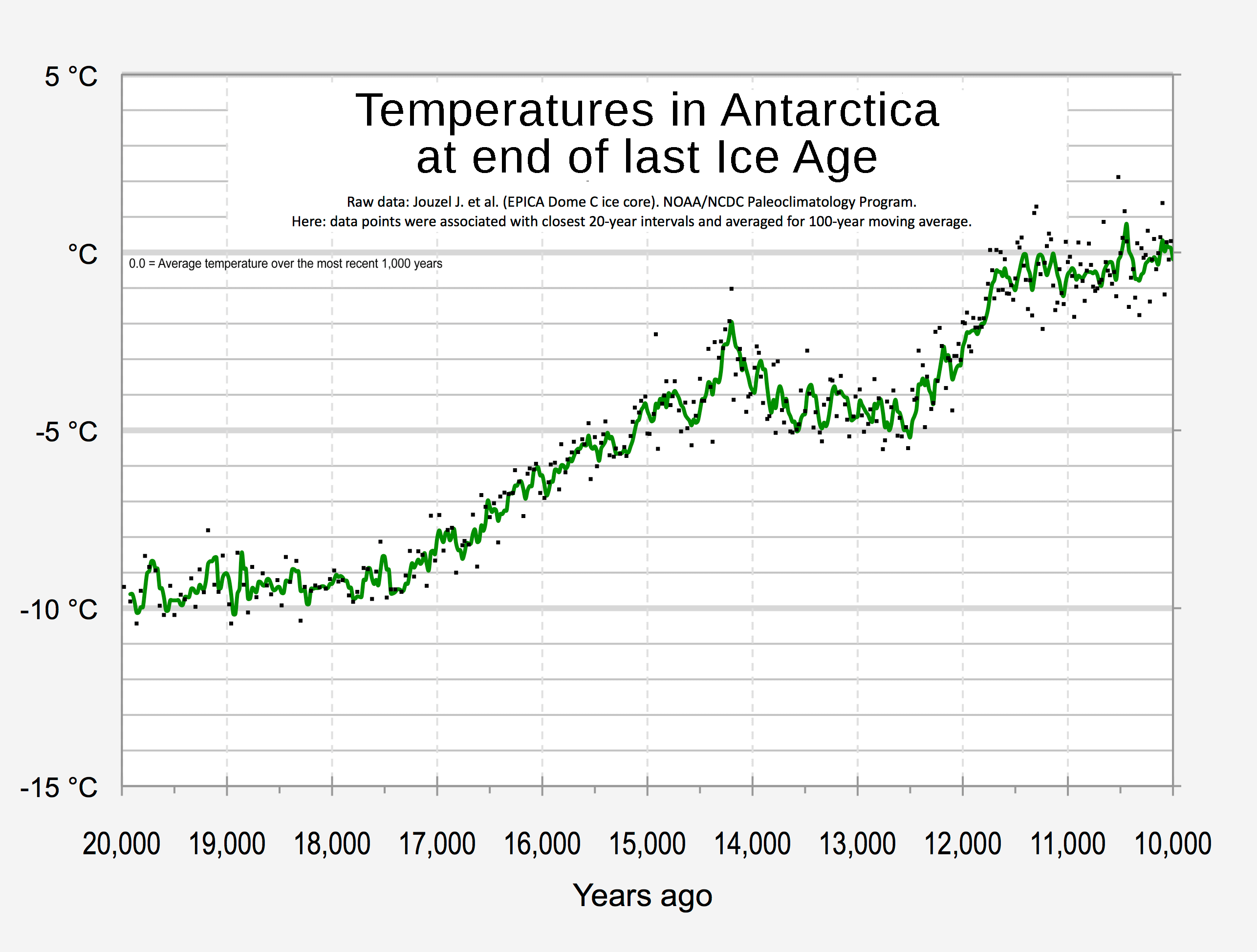
Temperature rise marking the end of the Pleistocene, as derived from Antarctic ice core data.

== Etymology ==
Charles Lyell introduced the term "Pleistocene" in 1839 to describe strata in Sicily that had at least 70% of their molluscan fauna still living today. This distinguished it from the older Pliocene Epoch, which Lyell had originally thought to be the youngest fossil rock layer. He constructed the name "Pleistocene" ('most new' or 'newest') from the Greek πλεῖστος (pleīstos) 'most' and καινός (kainós (Latinized as cænus) 'new'). This contrasts with the immediately preceding Pliocene ("newer", from πλείων (pleíōn, "more") and kainós) and the immediately subsequent Holocene ("wholly new" or "entirely new", from ὅλος (hólos, "whole") and kainós) epoch, which extends to the present time.

== Dating ==
Hominin timeline
← / Earlier apes; ← / Gorilla split; ← / Chimpanzee split; ← / Earliest bipedal; ← / Earliest sign of Ardipithecus; ← / Earliest sign of Australopithecus; ← / Earliest stone tools; ← / Earliest sign of Homo; ← / Dispersal beyond Africa; ← / Earliest fire / cooking; ← / Earliest rock art; ← / Earliest clothes; ← / Modern humans
(million years ago)

The Pleistocene has been dated from 2.580 million (±0.005) to 11,700 years BP with the end date expressed in radiocarbon years as 10,000 carbon-14 years BP. It covers most of the latest period of repeated glaciation, up to and including the Younger Dryas cold spell. The end of the Younger Dryas has been dated to about 9700 BCE (11,700 years before present). The end of the Younger Dryas is the official start of the current Holocene Epoch. Although it is considered an epoch, the Holocene was not significantly different in terms of temperature change than previous Pleistocene interglacial intervals, although the rapid onset of the Anthropocene is unprecedented. In the ICS timescale, the Pleistocene is divided into four stages or ages, the Gelasian, Calabrian, Chibanian (previously the unofficial "Middle Pleistocene"), and Upper Pleistocene (unofficially the "Tarantian"). (Note: The Upper Pleistocene is a subseries/subepoch rather than a stage/age but, in 2009, the IUGS decided that it will be replaced with a stage/age (currently unofficially/informally named the Tarantian).) In addition to these international subdivisions, various regional subdivisions are often used.

In 2009 the International Union of Geological Sciences (IUGS) confirmed a change in time period for the Pleistocene, changing the start date from 1.806 to 2.588 million years BP, and accepted the base of the Gelasian as the base of the Pleistocene, namely the base of the Monte San Nicola GSSP. The start date has now been rounded down to 2.580 million years BP. The IUGS has yet to approve a type section, Global Boundary Stratotype Section and Point (GSSP), for the upper Pleistocene/Holocene boundary (i.e. the upper boundary). The proposed section is the North Greenland Ice Core Project ice core 75° 06' N 42° 18' W. The lower boundary of the Pleistocene Series is formally defined magnetostratigraphically as the base of the Matuyama (C2r) chronozone, isotopic stage 103. Above this point there are notable extinctions of the calcareous nannofossils: Discoaster pentaradiatus and Discoaster surculus. The Pleistocene covers the recent period of repeated glaciations.

The name Plio-Pleistocene has, in the past, been used to mean the last ice age. Formerly, the boundary between the two epochs was drawn at the time when the foraminiferal species Hyalinea baltica first appeared in the marine section at La Castella, Calabria, Italy. However, the revised definition of the Quaternary, by pushing back the start date of the Pleistocene to 2.58 Ma, results in the inclusion of all the recent repeated glaciations within the Pleistocene.

While radiocarbon dating is well-suited for dates in the Holocene, its half life is too short for practical use in Pleistocene dating. Instead geologists use marine isotope stages derived from oxygen isotopes to date materials deposited in the Pleistocene.

== Deposits ==
Pleistocene non-marine sediments are found primarily in fluvial deposits, lakebeds, slope and loess deposits as well as in the large amounts of material moved about by glaciers. Less common are cave deposits, travertines and volcanic deposits (lavas, ashes). Pleistocene marine deposits are found primarily in shallow marine basins mostly (but with important exceptions) in areas within a few tens of kilometres of the modern shoreline. In a few geologically active areas such as the Southern California coast, Pleistocene marine deposits may be found at elevations of several hundred metres.

== Paleogeography and climate ==
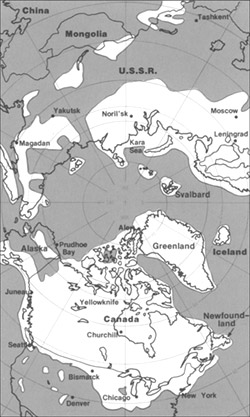
The maximum extent of glacial ice in the north polar area during the Pleistocene Period

The modern continents were essentially at their present positions during the Pleistocene, the plates upon which they sit probably having moved no more than 100 km (62 mi) relative to each other since the beginning of the period. In glacial periods, the sea level would drop by up to 120 m (390 ft) lower than today during peak glaciation, exposing large areas of the present continental shelf as dry land.

According to Mark Lynas (through collected data), the Pleistocene's overall climate could be characterised as a continuous El Niño with trade winds in the south Pacific weakening or heading east, warm air rising near Peru, warm water spreading from the west Pacific and the Indian Ocean to the east Pacific, and other El Niño markers.

=== Glacial features ===
Pleistocene climate was marked by repeated glacial cycles in which continental glaciers pushed to the 40th parallel in some places. It is estimated that, at maximum glacial extent, 30% of the Earth's surface was covered by ice. In addition, a zone of permafrost stretched southward from the edge of the glacial sheet, a few hundred kilometres in North America, and several hundred in Eurasia. The mean annual temperature at the edge of the ice was −6 °C (21 °F); at the edge of the permafrost, 0 °C (32 °F).

Each glacial advance tied up huge volumes of water in continental ice sheets 1,500 to 3,000 metres (4,900–9,800 ft) thick, resulting in temporary sea-level drops of 100 metres (300 ft) or more over the entire surface of the Earth. During interglacial times, such as at present, drowned coastlines were common, mitigated by isostatic or other emergent motion of some regions.

The effects of glaciation were global. Antarctica was ice-bound throughout the Pleistocene as well as the preceding Pliocene. The Andes were covered in the south by the Patagonian ice cap. There were glaciers in New Zealand and Tasmania. The current decaying glaciers of Mount Kenya, Mount Kilimanjaro, and the Ruwenzori Range in east and central Africa were larger. Glaciers existed in the mountains of Ethiopia and to the west in the Atlas Mountains.

In the northern hemisphere, many glaciers fused into one. The Cordilleran Ice Sheet covered the North American northwest; the east was covered by the Laurentide. The Fenno-Scandian ice sheet rested on northern Europe, including much of Great Britain; the Alpine ice sheet on the Alps. Scattered domes stretched across Siberia and the Arctic shelf. The northern seas were ice-covered.

South of the ice sheets large lakes accumulated because outlets were blocked and the cooler air slowed evaporation. When the Laurentide Ice Sheet retreated, north-central North America was completely covered by Lake Agassiz. Over a hundred basins, now dry or nearly so, were overflowing in the North American west. Lake Bonneville, for example, stood where Great Salt Lake now does. In Eurasia, large lakes developed as a result of the runoff from the glaciers. Rivers were larger, had a more copious flow, and were braided. African lakes were fuller, apparently from decreased evaporation. Deserts, on the other hand, were drier and more extensive. Rainfall was lower because of the decreases in oceanic and other evaporation.

It has been estimated that during the Pleistocene, the East Antarctic Ice Sheet thinned by at least 500 metres, and that thinning since the Last Glacial Maximum is less than 50 metres and probably started after c. 14 ka.

=== Major events ===
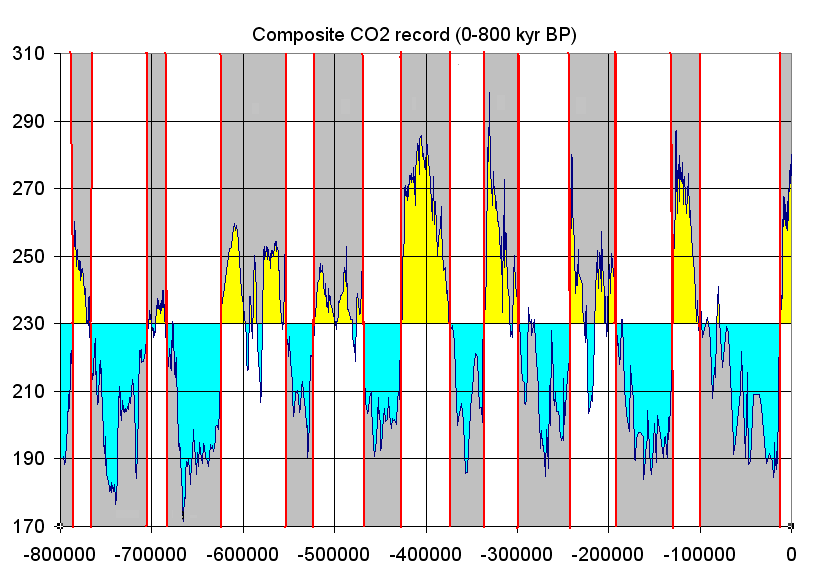
Ice ages as reflected in atmospheric CO_{2}, stored in the bubbles from glacial ice of Antarctica

During the 2.5 million years of the Pleistocene, numerous cold phases called glacials (Quaternary ice age), or significant advances of continental ice sheets, in Europe and North America, occurred at intervals of approximately 40,000 to 100,000 years. The long glacial periods were separated by more temperate and shorter interglacials which lasted about 10,000–15,000 years. The last cold episode of the last glacial period ended about 10,000 years ago. Over 11 major glacial events have been identified, as well as many minor glacial events. A major glacial event is a general glacial excursion, termed a "glacial". Glacials are separated by "interglacials". During a glacial, the glacier experiences minor advances and retreats. The minor excursion is a "stadial"; times between stadials are "interstadials".

These events are defined differently in different regions of the glacial range, which have their own glacial history depending on latitude, terrain and climate. There is a general correspondence between glacials in different regions. Investigators often interchange the names if the glacial geology of a region is in the process of being defined. However, it is generally incorrect to apply the name of a glacial in one region to another.

For most of the 20th century, only a few regions had been studied and the names were relatively few. Today the geologists of different nations are taking more of an interest in Pleistocene glaciology. As a consequence, the number of names is expanding rapidly and will continue to expand. Many of the advances and stadials remain unnamed. Also, the terrestrial evidence for some of them has been erased or obscured by larger ones, but evidence remains from the study of cyclical climate changes.

The glacials in the following tables show historical usages, are a simplification of a much more complex cycle of variation in climate and terrain, and are generally no longer used. The headings "Glacial 1" to "Glacial 4" are designations indicating the four most recent glacials, with "Glacial 4" being the most recent. These names have been abandoned in favour of numeric data because many of the correlations were found to be either inexact or incorrect and more than four major glacials have been recognised since the historical terminology was established.

Historical names of the "four major" glacials in four regions.
Region	Glacial 1	Glacial 2	Glacial 3	Glacial 4
Alps	Günz	Mindel	Riss	Würm
North Europe	Eburonian	Elsterian	Saalian	Weichselian
British Isles	Beestonian	Anglian	Wolstonian	Devensian
Midwest U.S.	Nebraskan	Kansan	Illinoian	Wisconsinan

Historical names of interglacials.
Region	Interglacial 1	Interglacial 2	Interglacial 3
Alps	Günz-Mindel	Mindel-Riss	Riss-Würm
North Europe	Waalian	Holsteinian	Eemian
British Isles	Cromerian	Hoxnian	Ipswichian
Midwest U.S.	Aftonian	Yarmouthian	Sangamonian

Corresponding to the terms glacial and interglacial, the terms pluvial and interpluvial are in use (Latin: pluvia, rain). A pluvial is a warmer period of increased rainfall; an interpluvial is of decreased rainfall. Formerly a pluvial was thought to correspond to a glacial in regions not iced, and in some cases it does. Rainfall is cyclical also. Pluvials and interpluvials are widespread.

There is no systematic correspondence between pluvials to glacials, however. Moreover, regional pluvials do not correspond to each other globally. For example, some have used the term "Riss pluvial" in Egyptian contexts. Any coincidence is an accident of regional factors. Only a few of the names for pluvials in restricted regions have been stratigraphically defined.

=== Palaeocycles ===
Map of Earth as it appeared 1 million years ago during the Pleistocene epoch, Calabrian stage

The sum of transient factors acting at the Earth's surface is cyclical: climate, ocean currents and other movements, wind currents, temperature, etc. The waveform response comes from the underlying cyclical motions of the planet, which eventually drag all the transients into harmony with them. The repeated glaciations of the Pleistocene were caused by the same factors.

The Mid-Pleistocene Transition, approximately one million years ago, saw a change from low-amplitude glacial cycles with a dominant periodicity of 41,000 years to asymmetric high-amplitude cycles dominated by a periodicity of 100,000 years.

However, a 2020 study concluded that ice age terminations might have been influenced by obliquity since the Mid-Pleistocene Transition, which caused stronger summers in the Northern Hemisphere.

==== Milankovitch cycles ====
Glaciation in the Pleistocene was a series of glacials and interglacials, stadials and interstadials, mirroring periodic climate changes. The main factor at work in climate cycling is now believed to be Milankovitch cycles. These are periodic variations in regional and planetary solar radiation reaching the Earth caused by several repeating changes in the Earth's motion. The effects of Milankovitch cycles were enhanced by various positive feedbacks related to increases in atmospheric carbon dioxide concentrations and Earth's albedo.

Milankovitch cycles cannot be the sole factor responsible for the variations in climate since they explain neither the long-term cooling trend over the Plio-Pleistocene nor the millennial variations in the Greenland Ice Cores known as Dansgaard-Oeschger events and Heinrich events. Milankovitch pacing seems to best explain glaciation events with periodicity of 100,000, 40,000, and 20,000 years. Such a pattern seems to fit the information on climate change found in oxygen isotope cores.

==== Oxygen isotope ratio cycles ====
In oxygen isotope ratio analysis, variations in the ratio of ^{18}O to ^{16}O (two isotopes of oxygen) by mass (measured by a mass spectrometer) present in the calcite of oceanic core samples is used as a diagnostic of ancient ocean temperature change and therefore of climate change. Cold oceans are richer in ^{18}O, which is included in the tests of the microorganisms (foraminifera) contributing the calcite.

A more recent version of the sampling process makes use of modern glacial ice cores. Although less rich in ^{18}O than seawater, the snow that fell on the glacier year by year nevertheless contained ^{18}O and ^{16}O in a ratio that depended on the mean annual temperature.

Temperature and climate change are cyclical when plotted on a graph of temperature versus time. Temperature coordinates are given in the form of a deviation from today's annual mean temperature, taken as zero. This sort of graph is based on another isotope ratio versus time. Ratios are converted to a percentage difference from the ratio found in standard mean ocean water (SMOW).

The graph in either form appears as a waveform with overtones. One half of a period is a Marine isotopic stage (MIS). It indicates a glacial (below zero) or an interglacial (above zero). Overtones are stadials or interstadials.

According to this evidence, Earth experienced 102 MIS stages beginning at about 2.588 Ma BP in the Early Pleistocene Gelasian. Early Pleistocene stages were shallow and frequent. The latest were the most intense and most widely spaced.

By convention, stages are numbered from the Holocene, which is MIS1. Glacials receive an even number and interglacials receive an odd number. The first major glacial was MIS2-4 at about 85–11 ka BP. The largest glacials were 2, 6, 12, and 16. The warmest interglacials were 1, 5, 9 and 11. For matching of MIS numbers to named stages, see under the articles for those names.

== Fauna ==
Both marine and continental faunas were essentially modern but with many more large land mammals such as mammoths, mastodons, Diprotodons, Smilodons, tigers, lions, aurochs, short-faced bears, giant sloths, species within Gigantopithecus and others. Isolated landmasses such as Australia, Madagascar, New Zealand and islands in the Pacific saw the evolution of large birds and even reptiles such as the elephant bird, moa, Haast's eagle, Quinkana, Megalania and Meiolania.

The start of the Pleistocene coincided with a significant acceleration of a drop in ungulate functional diversity around 2.5 Ma that had been occurring since the Late Miocene, likely as a result of the start of bipolar glaciation and consequent global aridification.

The severe climatic changes during the Ice Age had major impacts on the fauna and flora. With each advance of the ice, large areas of the continents became depopulated, and plants and animals retreating southwards in front of the advancing glacier faced tremendous stress. The most severe stress resulted from drastic climatic changes, reduced living space, and curtailed food supply. A major extinction event of large mammals (megafauna), which included mammoths, mastodons, saber-toothed cats, glyptodons, the woolly rhinoceros, various giraffids such as the Sivatherium, ground sloths, Irish elk, cave lions, cave bears, Gomphotheres, American lions, dire wolves, and short-faced bears, began late in the Pleistocene and continued into the Holocene. Neanderthals also became extinct during this period. At the end of the last ice age, cold-blooded animals, smaller mammals like wood mice, migratory birds, and swifter animals like whitetail deer had replaced the megafauna and migrated north. Late Pleistocene bighorn sheep were more slender and had longer legs than their descendants today. Scientists believe that the change in predator fauna after the late Pleistocene extinctions resulted in a change of body shape as the species adapted for increased power rather than speed.

The extinctions hardly affected Africa but were especially severe in North America where native horses and camels were wiped out.

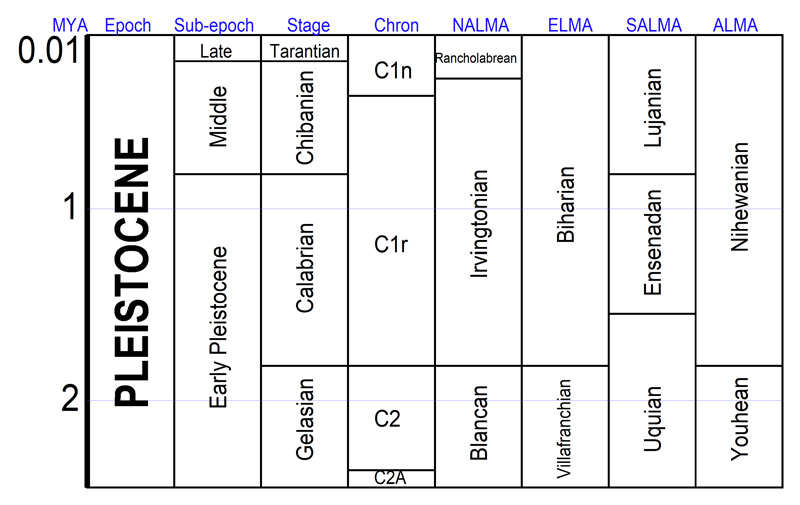
Various schemes for subdividing the Pleistocene

- Asian land mammal ages (ALMA) include Zhoukoudianian, Nihewanian, and Yushean.
- European land mammal ages (ELMA) include the Villafranchian, Galerian, and Aurelian
- North American land mammal ages (NALMA) include Blancan (4.75–1.8), Irvingtonian (1.8–0.24) and Rancholabrean (0.24–0.01) in millions of years. The Blancan extends significantly back into the Pliocene.
- South American land mammal ages (SALMA) include Uquian (2.5–1.5), Ensenadan (1.5–0.3) and Lujanian (0.3–0.01) in millions of years. The Uquian previously extended significantly back into the Pliocene, although the new definition places it entirely within the Pleistocene.

In July 2018, a team of Russian scientists in collaboration with Princeton University announced that they had brought two female nematodes frozen in permafrost, from around 42,000 years ago, back to life. The two nematodes, at the time, were the oldest confirmed living animals on the planet.

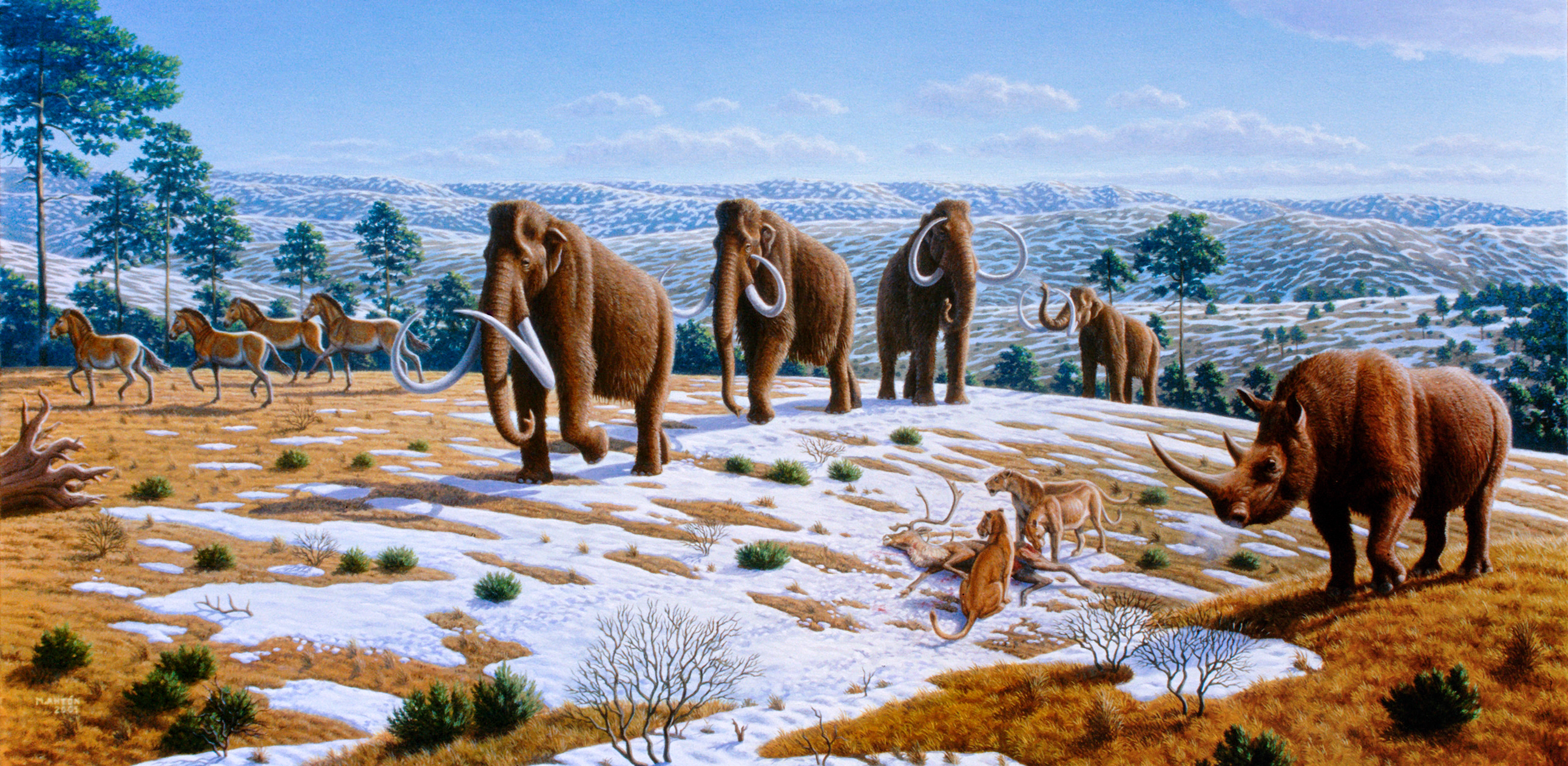
Pleistocene of Northern Spain, including woolly mammoth, cave lions eating a reindeer, horses, and woolly rhinoceros

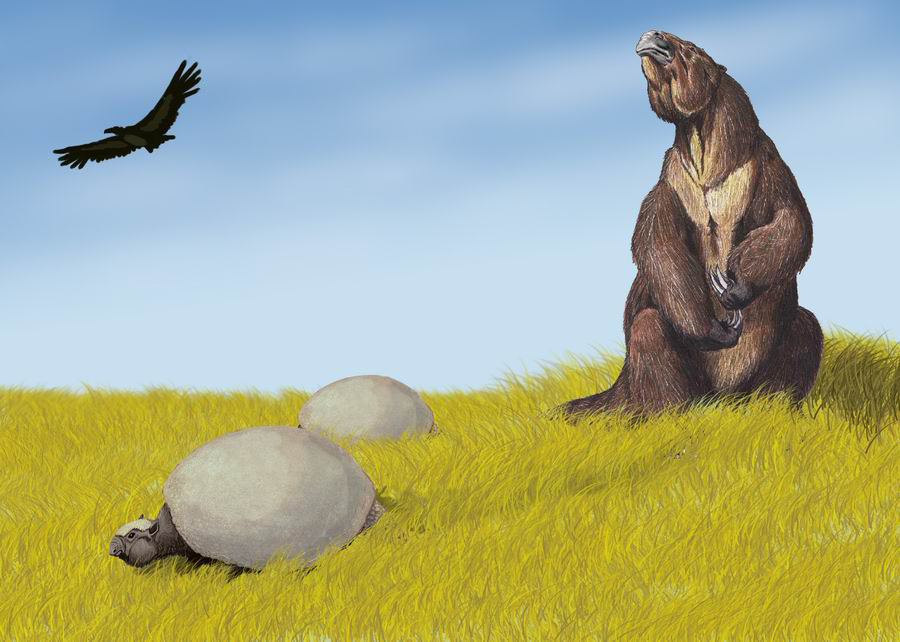
Pleistocene of South America, including Megatherium and two Glyptodon

=== Humans ===
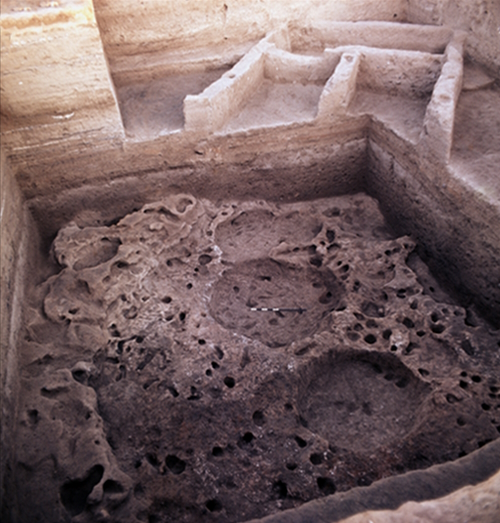
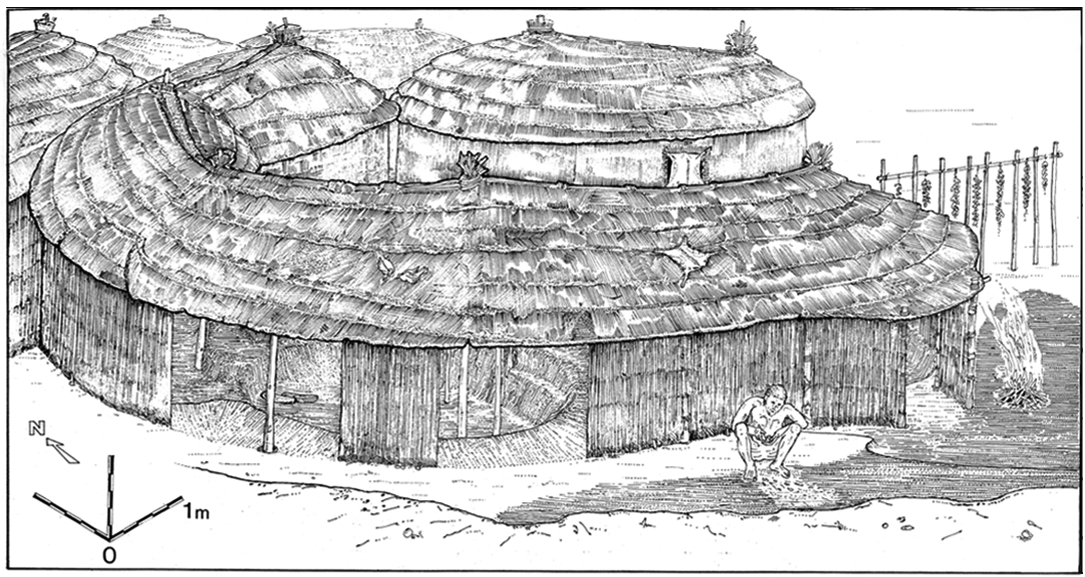
Remain of Epipalaeolithic 1A (13,300-12,800 cal BP) Pit-house dwellings in the foreground, and reconstruction of phase 1A pit dwellings of Abu Hureyra.

The evolution of anatomically modern humans took place during the Pleistocene. At the beginning of the Pleistocene Paranthropus species were still present, as well as early human ancestors, but during the lower Palaeolithic they disappeared, and the only hominin species found in fossilic records is Homo erectus for much of the Pleistocene. Acheulean lithics appear along with Homo erectus, some 1.8 million years ago, replacing the more primitive Oldowan industry used by Australopithecus garhi and by the earliest species of Homo. The Middle Paleolithic saw more varied speciation within Homo, including the appearance of Homo sapiens about 300,000 years ago. Artifacts associated with modern human behavior are unambiguously attested starting 40,000–50,000 years ago.

According to mitochondrial timing techniques, modern humans migrated from Africa after the Riss glaciation in the Middle Palaeolithic during the Eemian Stage, spreading all over the ice-free world during the late Pleistocene. A 2005 study posits that humans in this migration interbred with archaic human forms already outside of Africa by the late Pleistocene, incorporating archaic human genetic material into the modern human gene pool.

Hominin species during Pleistocene

== See also ==
- Climate change
- Pleistocene megafauna
- Pleistocene Park
- Quaternary glaciation
