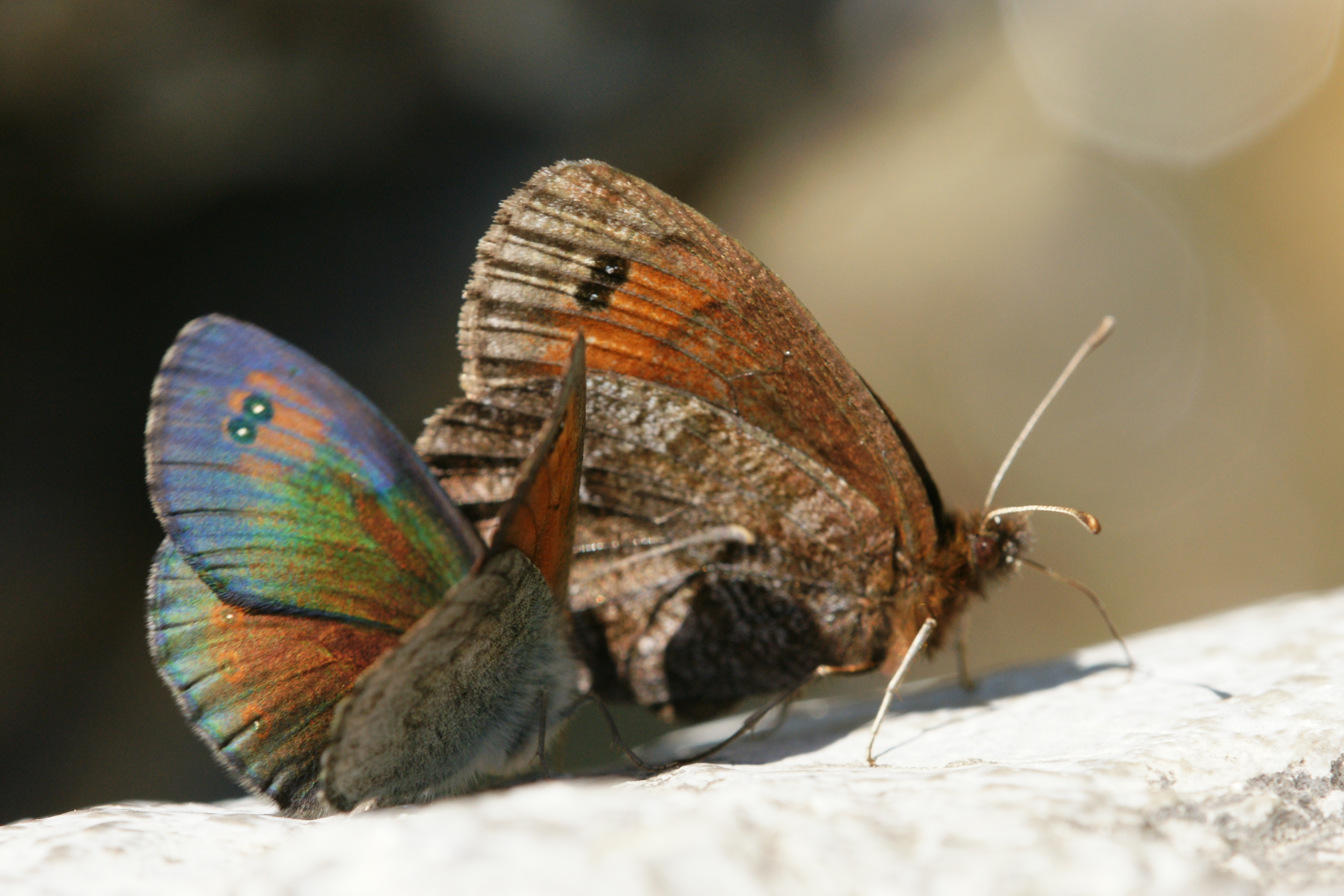

Conservation status
- Least Concern (IUCN 3.1)

Scientific classification
- Kingdom: Animalia
- Phylum: Arthropoda
- Clade: Pancrustacea
- Class: Insecta
- Order: Lepidoptera
- Family: Nymphalidae
- Genus: Erebia
- Species: E. tyndarus

Binomial name
- Erebia tyndarus (Esper, 1781)

Synonyms
- Papilio tyndarus Esper, 1781

= Erebia tyndarus =

Swiss brassy ringlet

Species of butterfly

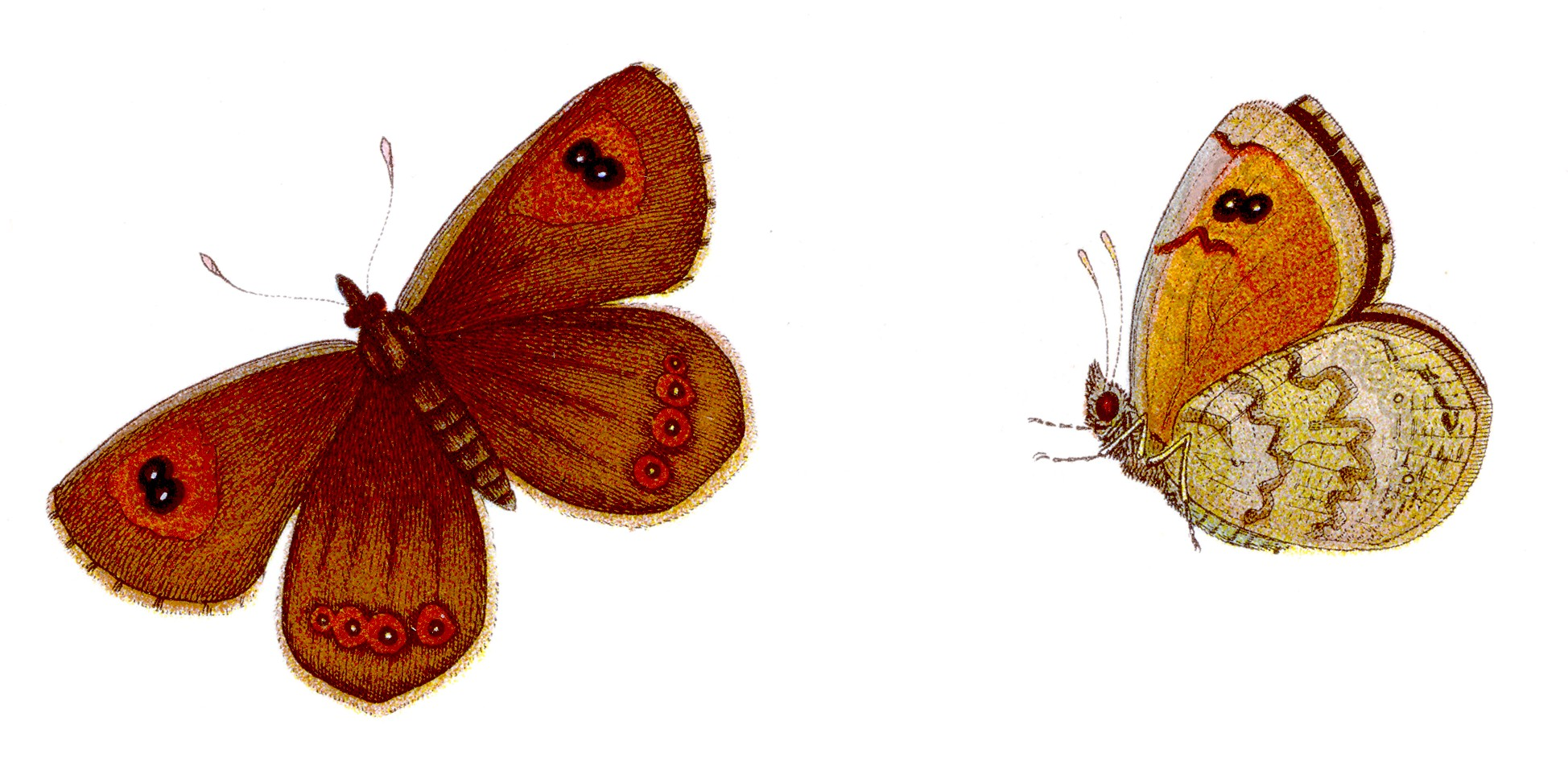
Drawing from Das kleine Schmetterlingsbuch: Die Tagfalter, Insel-Bücherei Nr. 213

Erebia tyndarus, the Swiss brassy ringlet, is a European brush-footed butterfly species of the subfamily Satyrinae.

== Systematics, taxonomy and evolution ==
The Swiss brassy ringlet belongs to the brassy ringlet group of its genus Erebia. These are found in taiga and alpine habitat across Eurasia, with one population in comparatively recent times colonizing North America. The brassy ringlet group, like many Erebia, has a complicated taxonomy, with scores of "variants" having been named in the late 19th and early 20th century. Most of these in fact were simply aberrations, local or seasonal forms. As this was realized, the brassy ringlets of the Alps and Pyrenees were united in E. tyndarus, either as a superspecies or as a species.

In recent times, this question has been restudied, including the DNA sequence data available nowadays. The view that only a single species of this non-migratory butterfly with restricted habitat preferences occurs in far-flung localities like the Sierra Nevada of southern Spain or the Julian Alps of Slovenia is generally considered obsolete.

Rather, it seems that quite a few proper species are involved. The Swiss brassy ringlet in particular is part of a cryptic species complex from the Alps. These diverged at the end of the Riss/Saale glaciation roughly 130,000 years ago, when the available habitat shifted up the mountains. The ancestors of the Alpine brassy ringlets had lived in the lowlands when the Alps were entirely covered by ice, and as the ice retreated, their typical habitat moved upwards, and the butterflies with them. Thus, populations became isolated in different mountain ranges and with gene flow between them restricted started to evolve into distinct species.

The brassy ringlets from the Alps, the closest relatives of E. tyndarus, consist of three further species:

- Erebia nivalis, or de Lesse's brassy ringlet, found in the highest regions of the Central Eastern Alps of Austria
- Erebia calcaria, or Lorkovic's brassy ringlet, from the Julian Alps which straddle the borders of Austria, Italy and Slovenia
- Erebia cassioides, or the common brassy ringlet, which occurs on meadows somewhat further downhill than the other species and consequently is widely distributed in the rest of the Alps.

The last is presumably closest to the last common ancestors of the Alpine brassy ringlets.

== Description and ecology ==
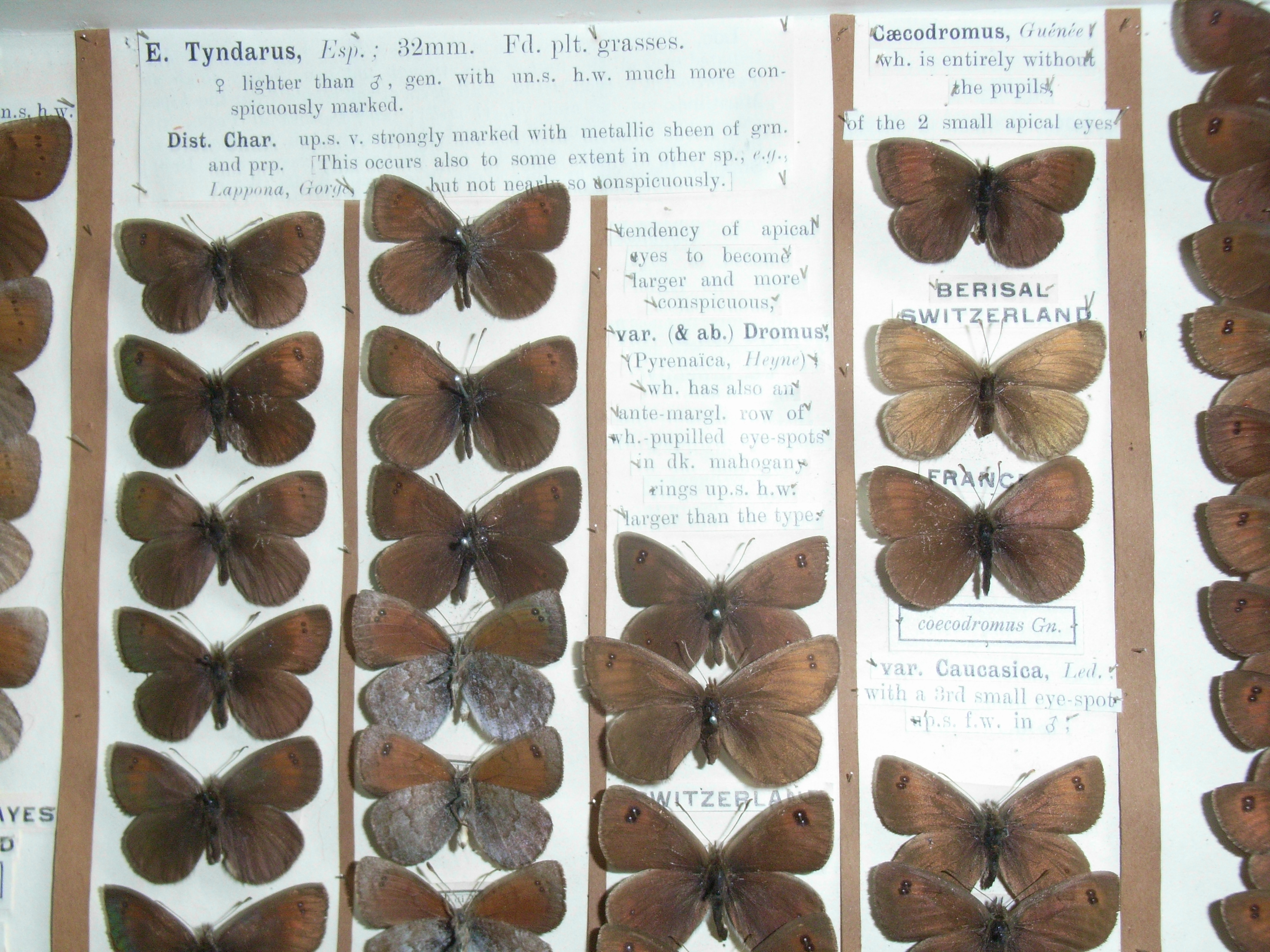
Specimen from the Langham and Wheeler collection in the Ulster Museum. Note the silvery hindwing underside in the second row from the left. The left two rows are typical specimens; the right two rows are developmental variants (not subspecies).

This mid-sized member of the genus Erebia has a wingspan around 35 mm. It has the blackish-brown upperwings typical of this genus. It also has the brassy sheen or green-gold lustre on the forewings (hence the common English name). These colours are caused by interference of the light on the wing scales.

The upper forewings, and sometimes the upper hindwings also, bear an extensive coppery or orange patch, near the tip in the former and running parallel to the outer margin in the latter. In this patch there are black eyespots with a white dot in the middle, two immediately next to each other in the forewings and three or four more evenly spaced ones in the hindwings. These small spots do not touch each other. However, the hindwing spots may be reduced or entirely absent, particularly in the males which also have a darker coloration overall.

The underwings are cryptically coloured in lighter greyish brown. A darker band arches between the forward and back margins of the hindwing, which has a prominent silvery sheen also found in closely related species of Erebia and conspicuous at a distance when these butterflies fly around in the sun. The reddish patches and the eyespots of the forewing also occur on the underwings, those of the hindwings usually do not.

The adults fly only for a brief time during summer, mainly in July and August, feeding on nectar of the preferred yellow mountain flowers. The eggs are green, oval and show many longitudinal ribs. The caterpillars are grey-green to grey-brown, with dark longitudinal lines. The pupa is thick and brown coloured. The Swiss brassy ringlet is univoltine and its caterpillars feed on Poaceae grasses, especially sheep's fescue (Festuca ovina), matgrass (Nardus stricta), and various other fescues (Festuca) and meadow-grasses (Poa). They overwinter and pupate on the ground around May and June.

== Distribution ==
This species can be found in the Alps of France, Italy, Germany, Switzerland, Liechtenstein, in Austrian Vorarlberg, and adjacent regions.

== Habitat ==
This species can be found above the treeline, in clearings and rocky alpine meadows, at an altitude of 1,200–2,700 metres (3,900–8,900 ft).
