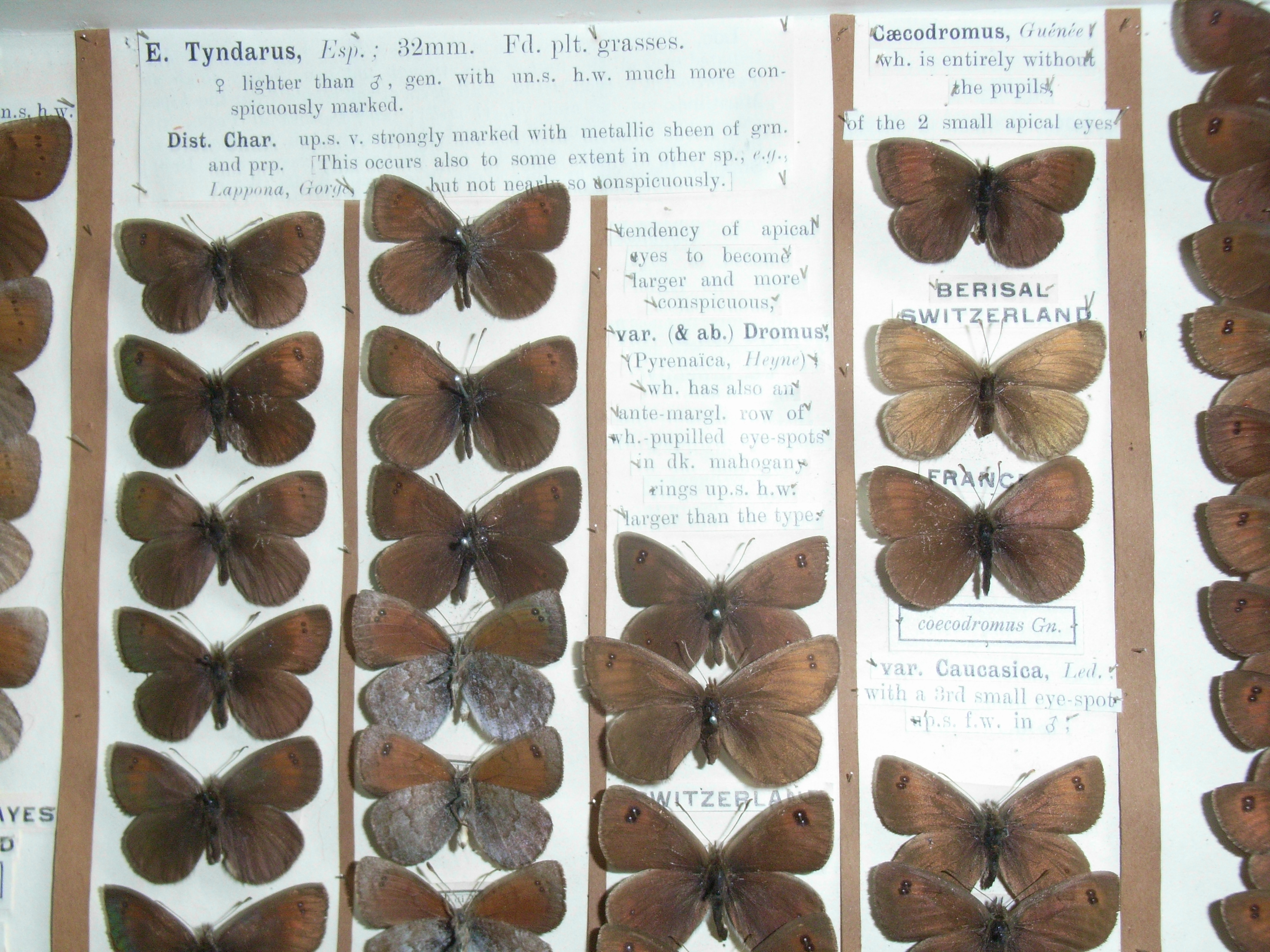
- Museum specimens of the Swiss brassy ringlet, Erebia tyndarus (the namesake species of this group), in the Langham and Wheeler collection, Ulster Museum. Note silvery hindwing underside visible in second row from the left. Left two rows are typical specimens, right two rows are developmental variants (not subspecies).

Scientific classification
- Kingdom: Animalia
- Phylum: Arthropoda
- Class: Insecta
- Order: Lepidoptera
- Family: Nymphalidae
- Genus: Erebia (partim)
- Species group: Erebia tyndarus species group

Species
- See text

= Brassy ringlet =

Species of butterfly

The brassy ringlets are a species group of ringlet butterflies in the genus Erebia. Though closely related, their monophyly is not completely resolved. Still, the brassy ringlets are taxa similar to E. tyndarus – the Swiss brassy ringlet –, and in many cases certainly close relatives. A notable trait of their genus is an ability to adapt well to cold and somewhat arid habitat, like taiga or regions with alpine climate. Optimal habitat in Eurasia, where most of the brassy ringlets are found, therefore occurs in two distinct belts – in the very north of the continent and in the Alpide belt – in interglacials, and in glacials in one periglacialic belt at lower altitude, in places interrupted by dry wasteland and deserts.

== Description ==
Brassy ringlets are mid-sized members of their genus, with a length of 17–22 mm (roughly two-thirds to one inch). Like their relatives, they have black eyespots on their forewings. The largest eyespots are placed, two on each side, near the wingtip, and have a white dot in the center; they are surrounded by a copper-colored patch that is lighter than the blackish-brown upperwings. In some, a third black spot, much smaller and without the white dot, is present at the opposite end of the reddish patch. The hindwings have no black spots in many, but in some taxa there are a few (2-4 or so) black dots, usually without white in the center, paralleling the outer margin. If hindwing spots are present, they are sometimes surrounded by a lighter brown field like the forewing spots, sometimes not. The wing undersides are cryptically colored, usually in grayish-brown and often with a noticeable band arching through the central hindwing, the rest of which has a silvery sheen which makes these species quite recognizable in flight. The eyespots and the forewing patch surrounding them are found on the forewing undersides also; if a hindwing pattern is present, it may or may not show up on the under hindwings either whole or in parts. The common name derives from the brassy luster of the dark wing uppersides. The valvae have a series of external spines pointing distally, with the first spine pair usually being the largest.

== Evolution ==
While the details are still somewhat conjectural, a quite robust evolutionary scenario has been developed for the brassy ringlet group:

As it seems, the origin of this group is perhaps south of the Central Asian or more likely in the Balkans region. Probably around 1 million years ago during the Pre-Pastonian Stage, the original population expanded north. During an interstadial, the southern montane metapopulation and the one to the north which ranged across the Eurasian taiga split.

Two major southern populations were established some 800,000-700,000 years ago during the Pastonian Stage, when the habitat belt moved uphill, cutting off gene flow between major mountain ranges. Coincident with the Günz-Mindel interglacial, about 600,000-500,000 years ago some more distinct local populations diverged in the south.

Meanwhile, the northern population had been spreading across Europe to the Pyrenees and deep into Siberia. With the ice – which had then been covering much of northern and central Europe – retreating at the end of the Elsterian Stage between 400,000 and 300,000 years ago, the taiga population and their relatives in the mountains of central and western Europe became isolated for good. Finally, at the end of the Riss/Saale glaciation about 130,000 years ago, Alpine and Siberian populations fragmented further. The former stayed rather distinct while more subsequent gene flow occurred between the latter; this difference is probably an effect of habitat topography.

A peculiar case is the Colorado alpine, the nominate subspecies of Erebia callias. This isolated Rocky Mountains population has been lumped with the Siberian brassy ringlets as they are almost alike morphologically. Though one might suspect stronger differentiation and perhaps marked cryptic speciation across the wide range, the Rocky Mountains population is apparently a very recent isolate. Its ancestors apparently crossed over the Bering Strait at the end of the Wisconsinian glaciation, about 15,000 to 10,000 years ago. Thus, brassy ringlets are present on the North American continent quite exactly for the same length of time as a significant human population.

== Systematics and taxonomy ==
Occasionally, as few as three species of brassy ringlets are accepted, or these are treated as superspecies. E. tyndarus is used for populations from the Pyrenees and Alps, and E. ottomana for those of the Balkans and the Caucasus. However, in this case the Caucasus population would also seem to warrant recognition at the same taxonomic rank as the others, as E. iranica. In addition, the related butterflies around Beringia have been united in the E. callias superspecies. Therefore, though E. callias might be split up on grounds of biogeography and ecology, the molecular and morphological data are still more in favor of retaining a single species. See also the discussion by Gratton, P. et al.

Based on analyses of mtDNA NADH dehydrogenase subunit 5 and CoxII sequence, ecological, and morphological data, the following species and well-distinct subspecies ought to be recognized:

Several brassy ringlets are shown in the lowest row on this plate from the 1915 Macrolepidoptera of the World, edited by Adalbert Seitz.

- Erebia calcaria Lorkovic, 1949 – Lorkovic's brassy ringlet
- Erebia callias Edwards, 1871
  - Erebia (callias) altajana Staudinger, 1901
  - Erebia (callias) callias – Colorado alpine
  - Erebia (callias) sibirica Staudinger, 1881
  - Erebia (callias) simulata Warren, 1933
- Erebia cassioides (Reiner & Hohenwarth, 1792) – Common brassy ringlet
  - Erebia (cassioides) arvernensis Oberthür 1908 – western brassy ringlet
  - Erebia (cassioides) carmenta Fruhstorfer, 1907 – western brassy ringlet
  - Erebia (cassioides) macedonica Buresch, 1918
- Erebia graucasica Jachontov, 1909
- Erebia hispania Butler, 1868 – Spanish brassy ringlet
- Erebia iranica Grum-Grshimailo, 1895
- Erebia nivalis Lorkovic & Lesse, 1954 – de Lesse's brassy ringlet
- Erebia ottomana Herrich-Schäffer, [1851] – Ottoman brassy ringlet
  - Erebia (ottomana) benacensis Warren 1933
- Erebia rondoui Oberthür 1908 (previously in E. cassioides)
- Erebia transcaucasica Warren, 1950 (previously in E. graucasica)
- Erebia tyndarus – Swiss brassy ringlet

== See also ==
- Species concept
- Species problem
