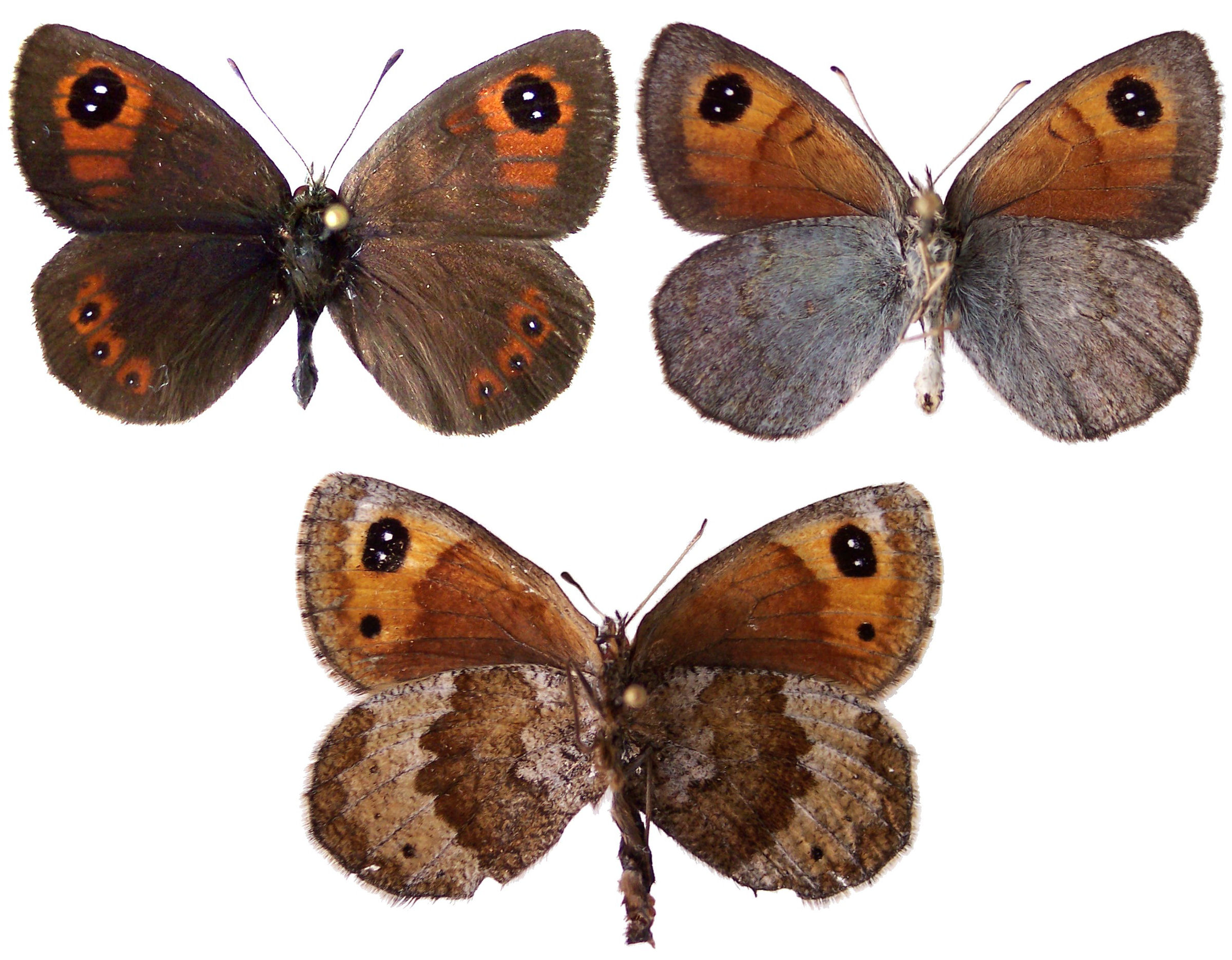
- E. hispania male (upper and underside) and female (underside) - Sentein, Ariege, France
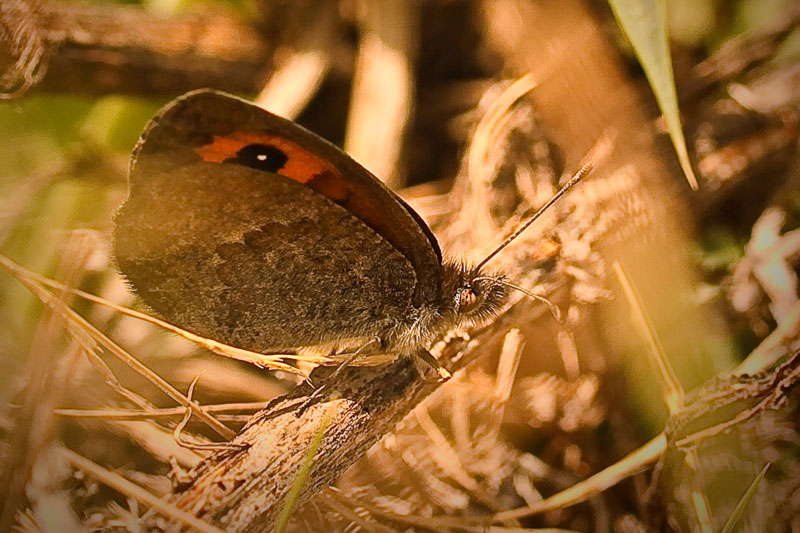

Scientific classification
- Kingdom: Animalia
- Phylum: Arthropoda
- Class: Insecta
- Order: Lepidoptera
- Family: Nymphalidae
- Genus: Erebia
- Species: E. hispania

Binomial name
- Erebia hispania Butler, 1868

= Erebia hispania =

Spanish brassy ringlet

Species of butterfly

Erebia hispania, the Spanish brassy ringlet, is a species of butterfly of the family Nymphalidae, endemic to the Sierra Nevada of southern Spain. The taxon rondoui (from the Pyrenees), previously considered as a subspecies of Erebia hispania, is considered now as a different species (Erebia rondoui) according to the results obtained in molecular studies.

The wingspan is 34–42 mm. Adults are on wing from July to August.

The larvae feed on various grasses, including Festuca species.

E. hispania is a member of the brassy ringlet species complex.
