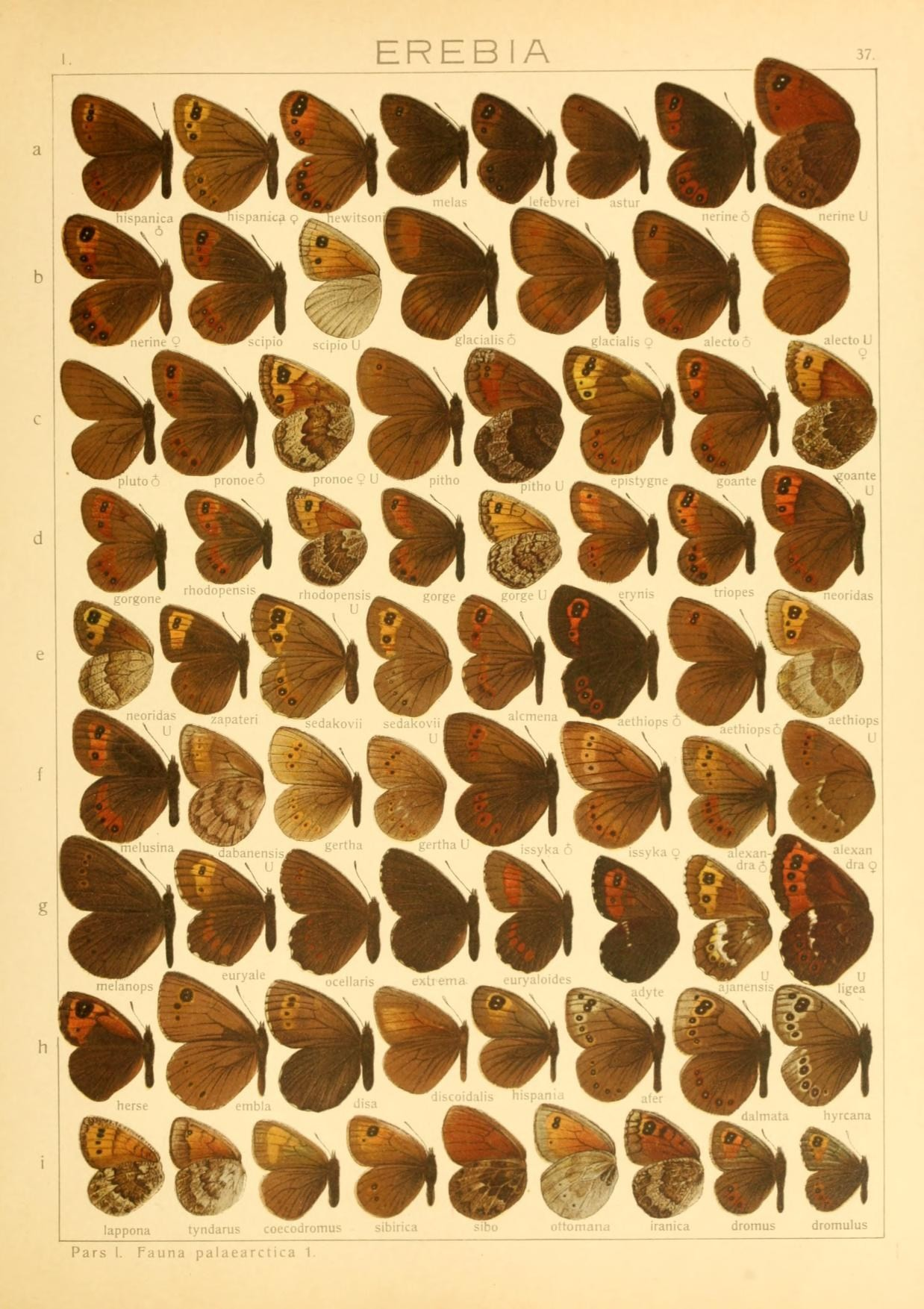
- Erebia iranica in Seitz 37i

Scientific classification
- Domain: Eukaryota
- Kingdom: Animalia
- Phylum: Arthropoda
- Class: Insecta
- Order: Lepidoptera
- Family: Nymphalidae
- Genus: Erebia
- Species: E. iranica

Binomial name
- Erebia iranica Grum-Grshimailo, 1895

Synonyms
- Erebia callias sheljuzhkoi Warren, 1935

= Erebia iranica =

Species of butterfly

Erebia iranica is a butterfly found in the East Palearctic (Caucasus North Iran, Turkey) that belongs to the browns family. E. iranica Gr.-Grsh. was described as a forma of Erebia tyndarus from North Persia. It is often smaller than the nymotypical form of tyndarus, the band of the fore- and hindwing being rather bright russet-red. The subapical ocelli of the forewing are large and bear bright white pupils.

== Subspecies ==
- E. i. iranica
- E. i. sheljuzhkoi Warren, 1935 (Caucasus)

== Taxonomy ==
E. iranica is a member of the brassy ringlet species complex.

== See also ==
- List of butterflies of Russia
