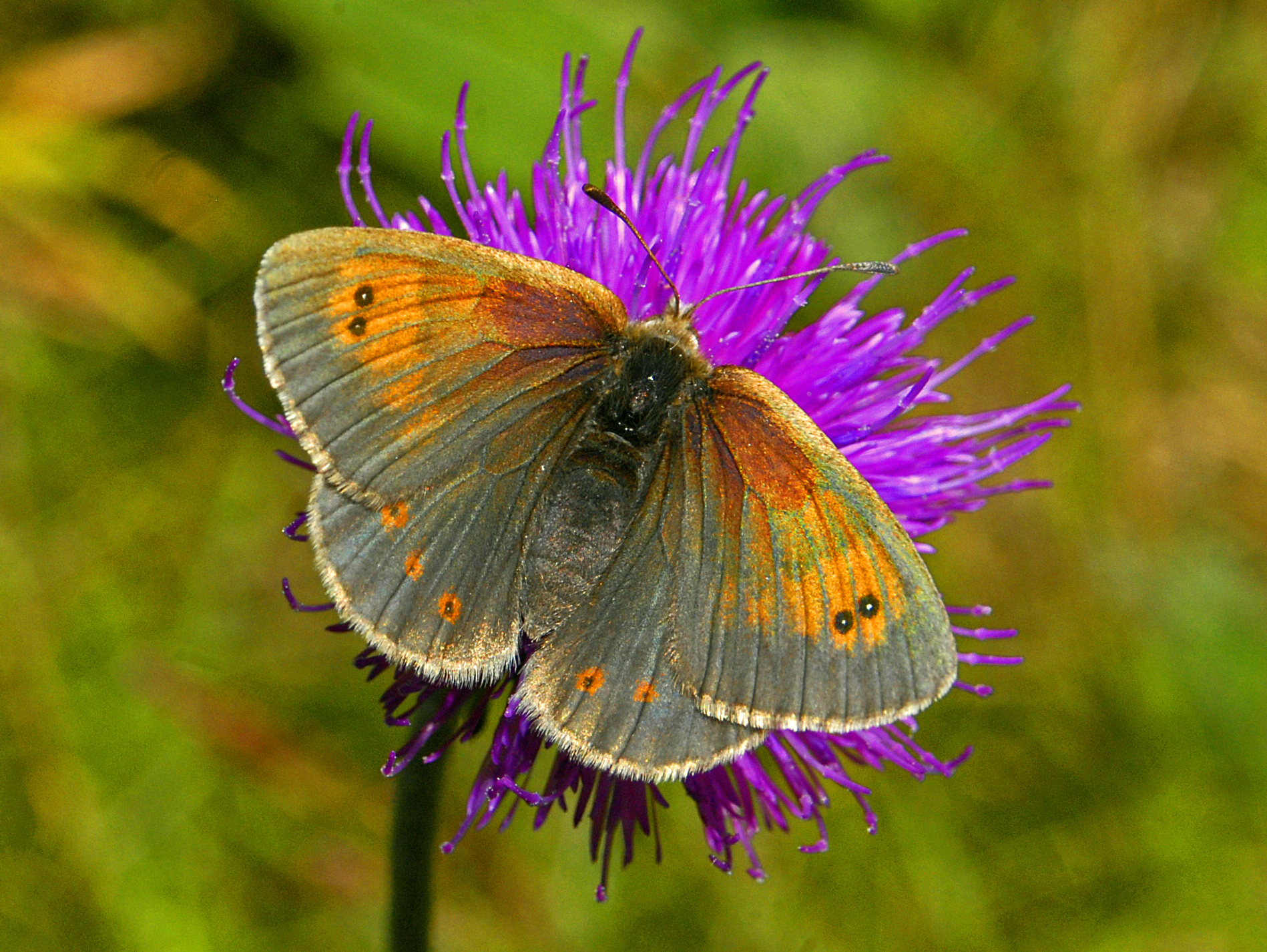
- E. c. arvernensis - female upperside
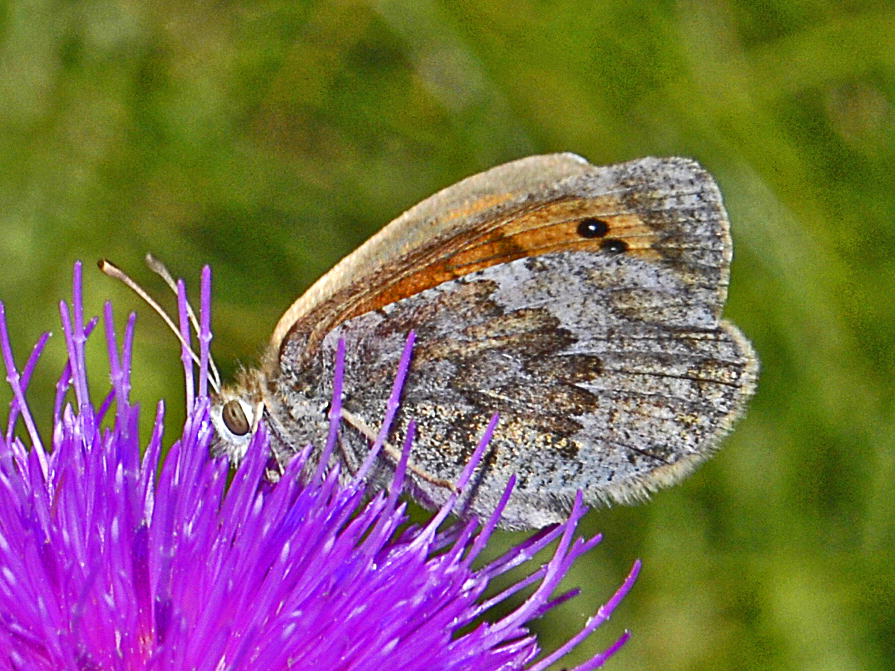
- E. c. arvernensis - underside

Conservation status
- Least Concern (IUCN 3.1)

Scientific classification
- Kingdom: Animalia
- Phylum: Arthropoda
- Class: Insecta
- Order: Lepidoptera
- Family: Nymphalidae
- Genus: Erebia
- Species: E. cassioides

Binomial name
- Erebia cassioides (Reiner & Hohenwarth, 1792)
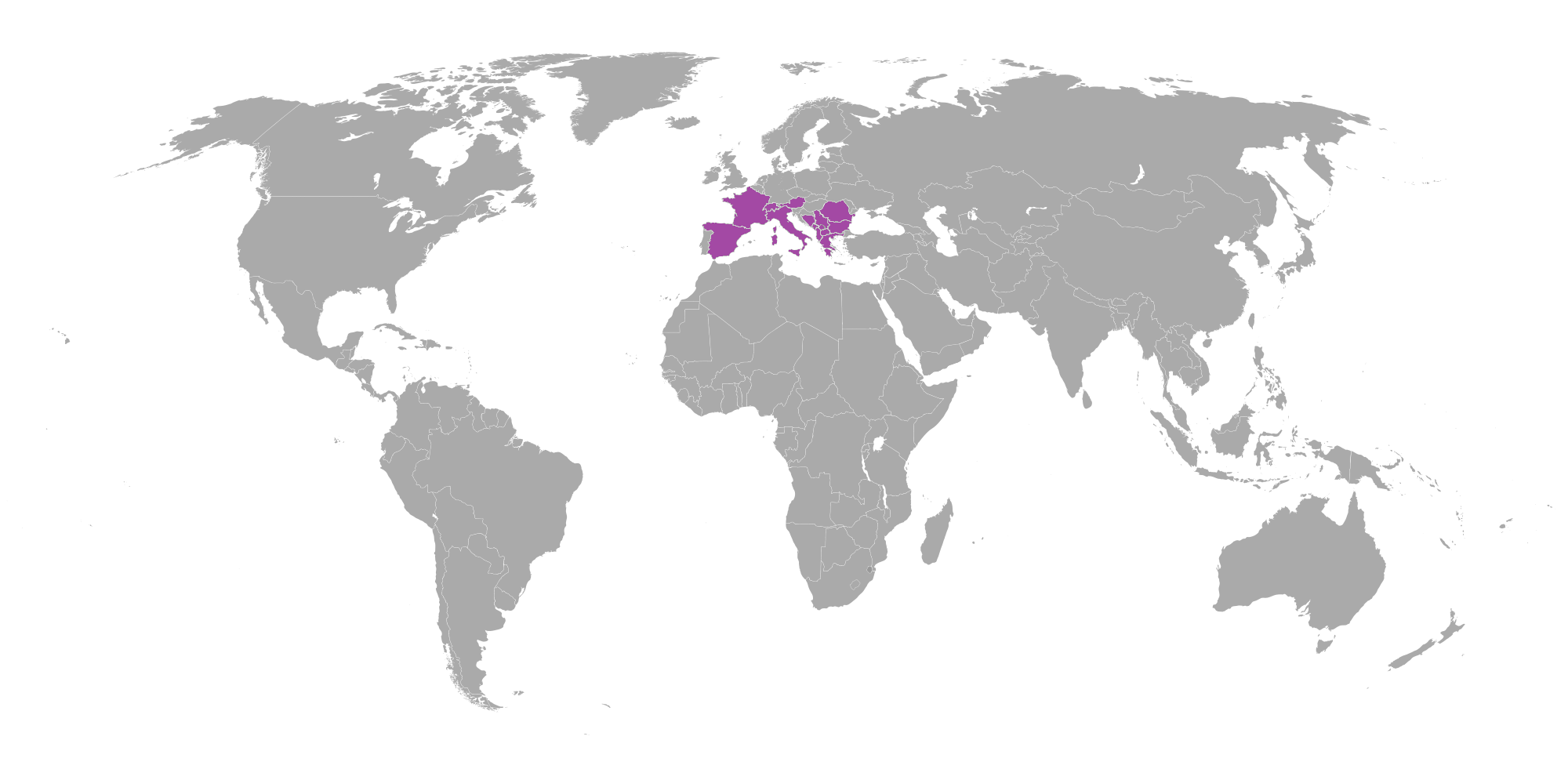

Synonyms
- Papilio cassioides Reiner & Hohenwarth, 1792

= Erebia cassioides =

Common brassy ringlet

Species of butterfly

Erebia cassioides, the common brassy ringlet, is a member of the subfamily Satyrinae of family Nymphalidae.

== Subspecies ==
Subspecies include:

- Erebia cassioides cassioides – common brassy ringlet
- Erebia cassioides arvernensis Oberthür 1908 - western brassy ringlet
- Erebia cassioides carmenta Fruhstorfer, 1907 - western brassy ringlet
- Erebia cassioides macedonica Buresch, 1918 (Bulgaria)
- Erebia cassioides illyrica Lorkovic, 1953
- Erebia cassioides tonalensis Arnscheid & Roos, 1976

On the basis of studies of enzymatic electrophoresis and of mitochondrial DNA the subspecies Erebia cassioides arvernensis should be considered a distinct species named Erebia dromus (Fabricius, 1793), which is distributed in the western Pyrenees, in the western Alps and in Apennines.

== Distribution and habitat ==
This European endemic species is present in Spain (Cantabrian Mountains, Pyrenees), France (Pyrenees, Massif Central and the western and eastern Alps), Italy, Switzerland, Romania (Carpathians), Bulgaria (Rila and Pirin Mountains.), Greece, North Macedonia and in the Balkans (Serbia, Montenegro, Albania and Bosnia). It prefers grassy slopes with stones and rocks at altitudes between 1,600 and 2,600 meters.

== Description ==
The wingspan is 32–38 mm. These small butterflies have a brown forewings with a metallic-greenish shine, the so-called "brassy ringlet". On the forewings there is an orange postdiscal band and two small ocelli pupillated with white towards the apex. A series of small ocelli appears on the hindwings. The underside of the forewings is orange with a brownish border and two small ocelli at the apex, while the hindwings are shiny silvery gray and ocher.

== Taxonomy ==
E. cassioides is a member of the brassy ringlet species complex.

== Biology ==
The females lay their eggs close to the ground, usually on dry stalks of grass. The larvae feed on various grasses (Festuca ovina, Poa species, Nardus stricta), including Gramineae species. The caterpillar hibernates in the first or second larval instar and pupates the following year between June and August. Adults fly from July to September with a peak in August.

== Gallery ==
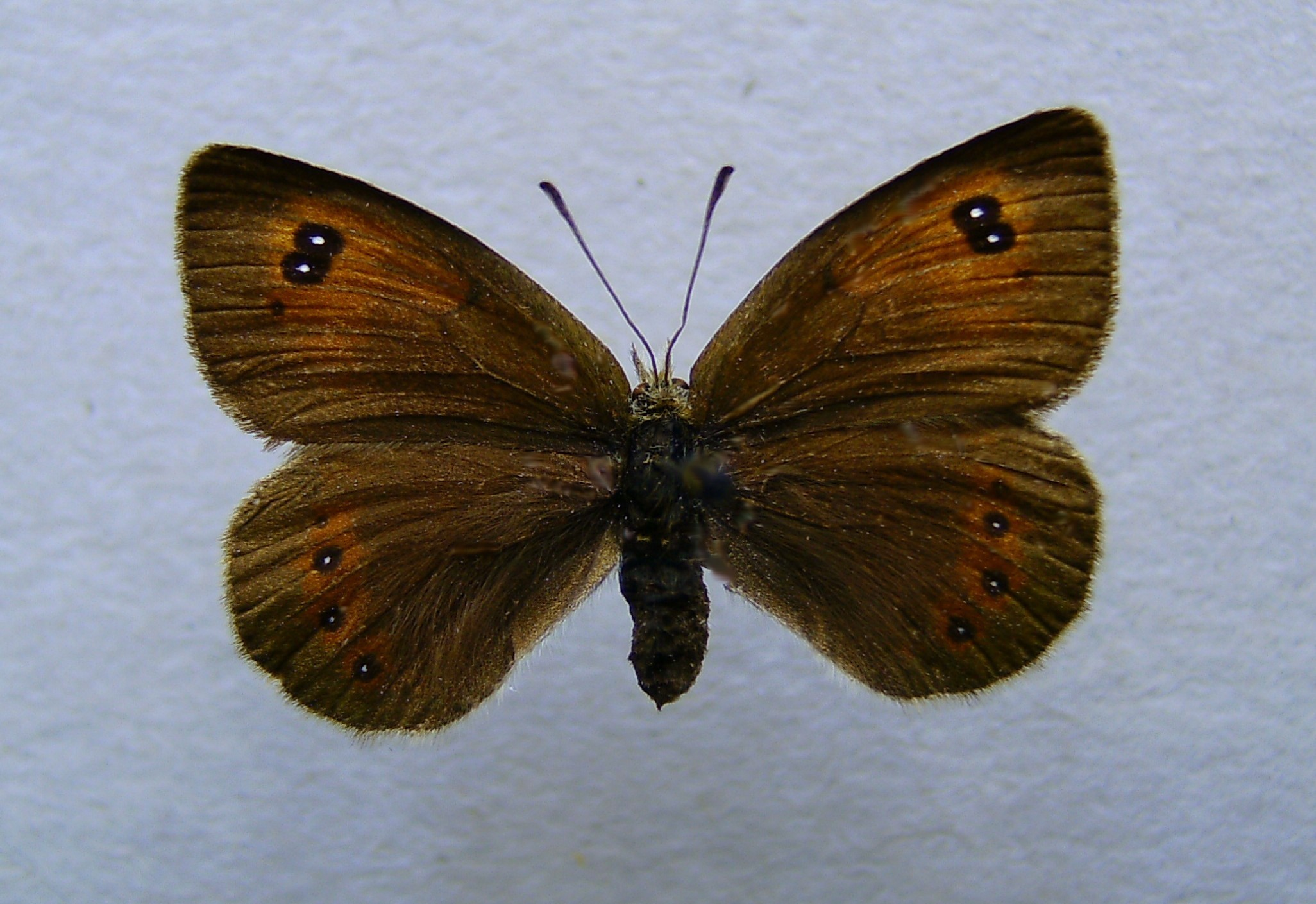
Upperside

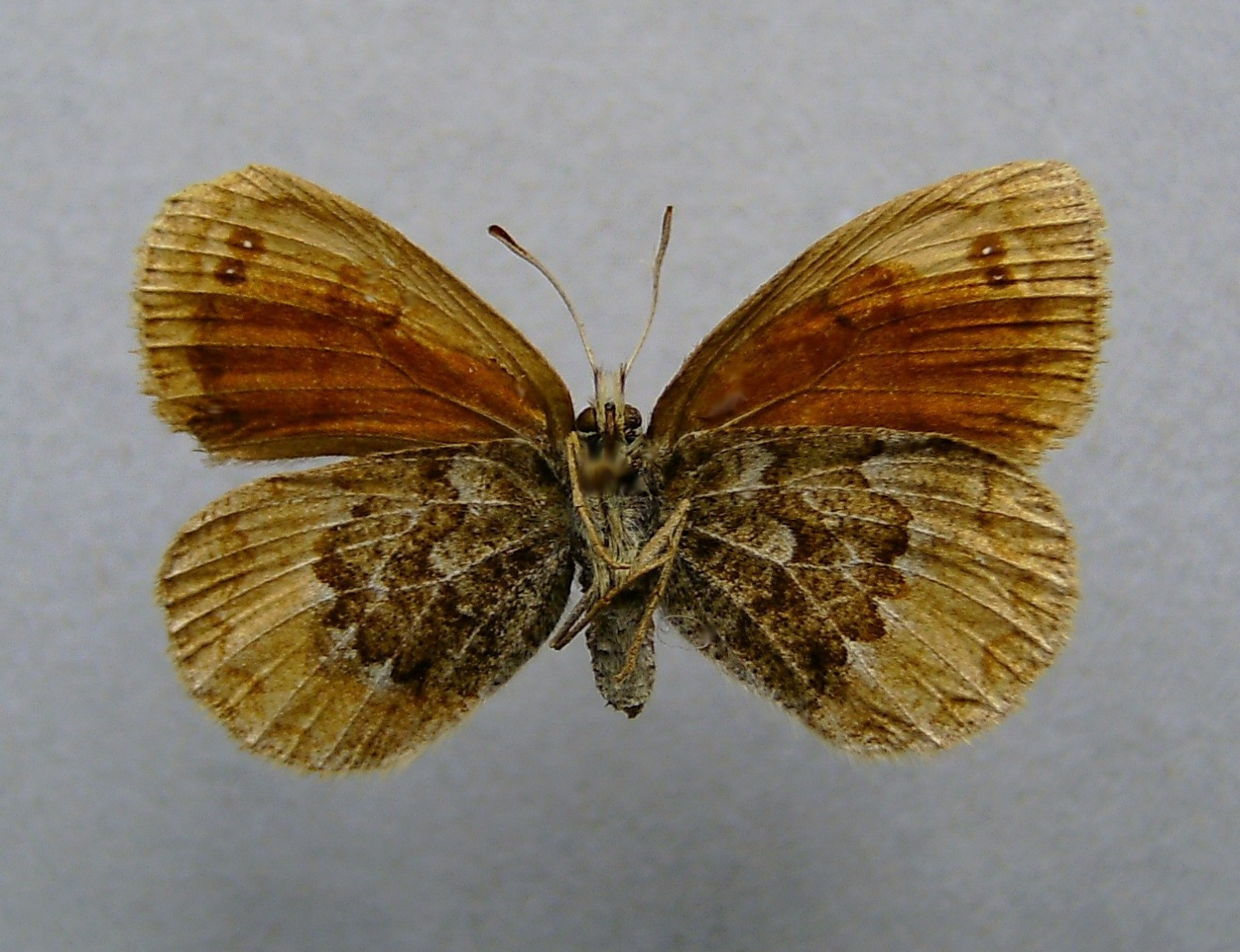
Underside

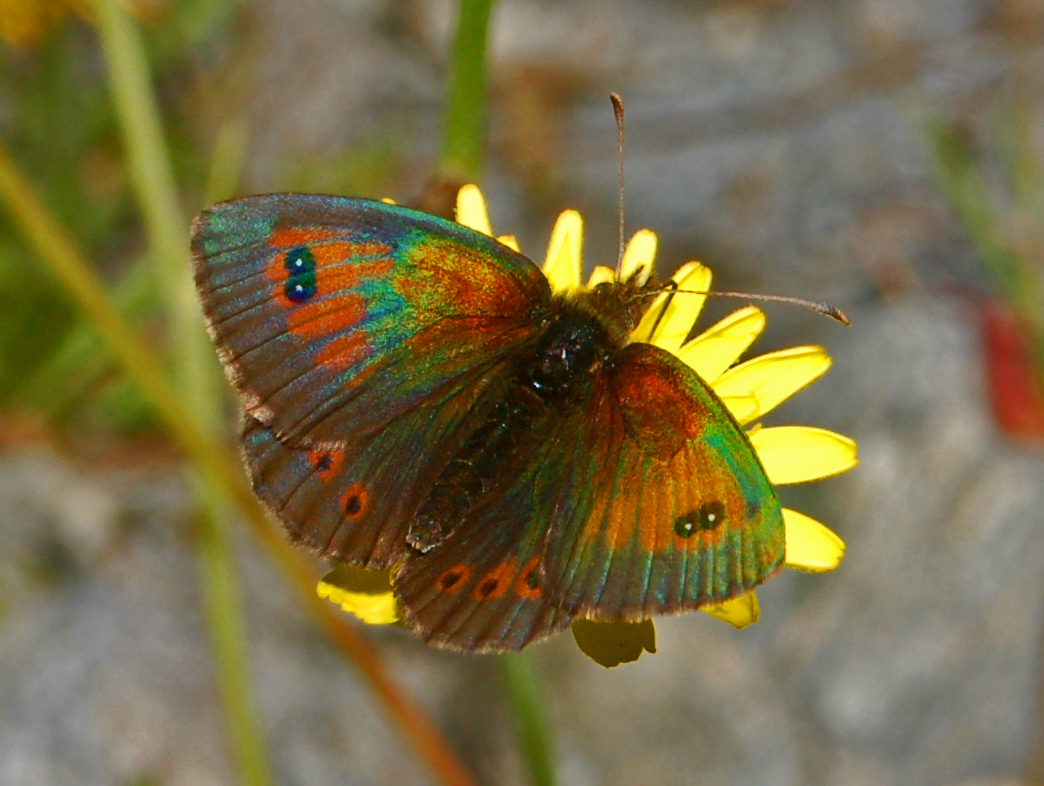
Erebia cassioides arvernensis

== Bibliography ==
- Albre (Jérôme), Gers (Charles) & Legal (Luc), 2008. Taxonomic notes on the species of the Erebia tyndarus group (Lepidoptera, Nymphalidae, Satyridae). Lépidoptères- Revue des Lépidoptéristes de France, vol. 17- N°39 : 12 - 28.
- Guide des papillons d'Europe et d'Afrique du Nord de Tom Tolman, Richard Lewington, éditions Delachaux et Niestlé, 1998 - (ISBN 2-603-01114-6)
- van Swaay, C., Wynhoff, I., Verovnik, R., Wiemers, M., López Munguira, M., Maes, D., Sasic, M., Verstrael, T., Warren, M. & Settele, J. 2010. Erebia cassioides.
