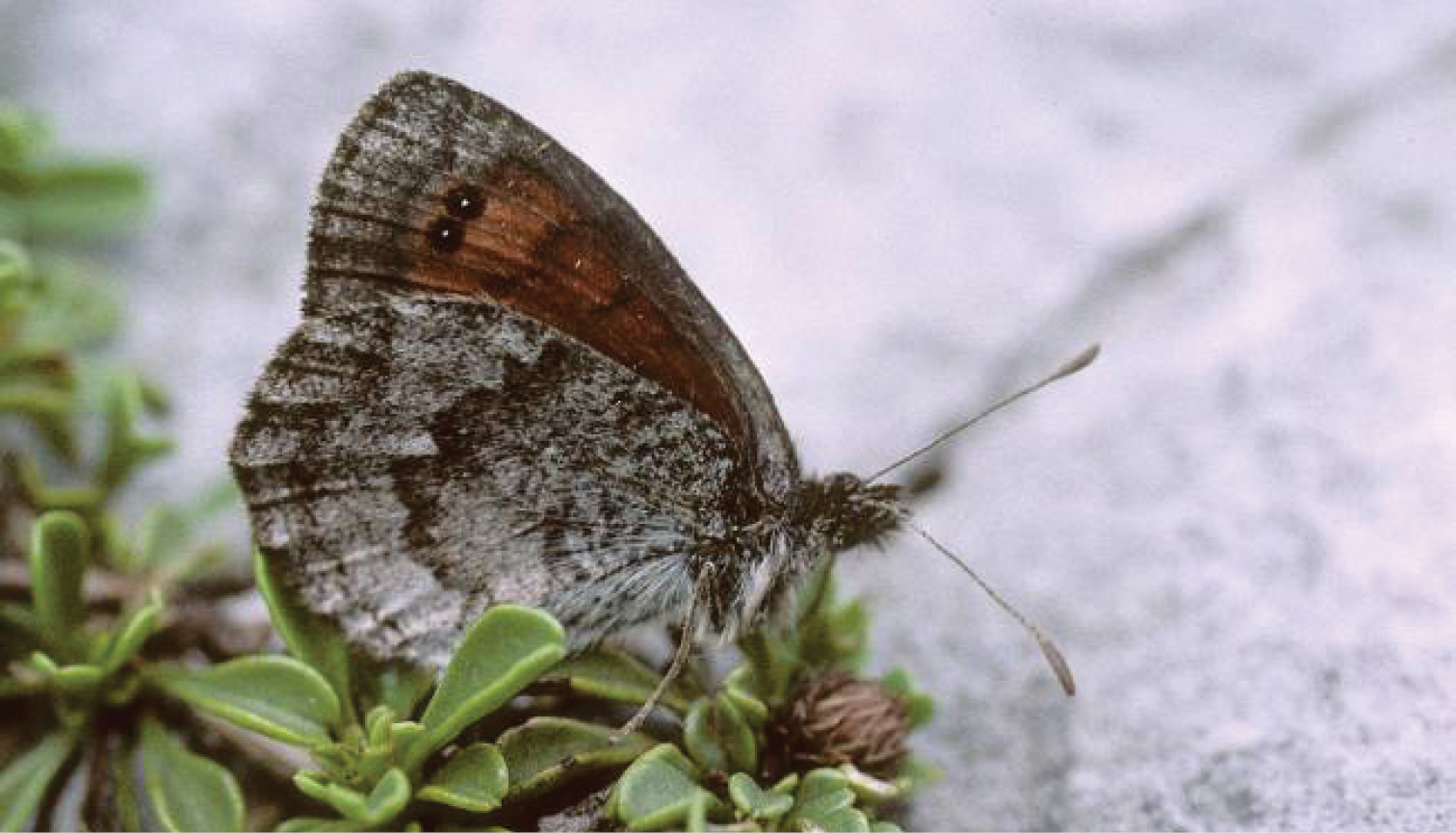

Scientific classification
- Domain: Eukaryota
- Kingdom: Animalia
- Phylum: Arthropoda
- Class: Insecta
- Order: Lepidoptera
- Family: Nymphalidae
- Genus: Erebia
- Species: E. calcaria

Binomial name
- Erebia calcaria (Lorković, 1949)

= Erebia calcaria =

Lorkovic's brassy ringlet

Species of butterfly

Erebia calcaria, or Lorkovic's brassy ringlet, is a butterfly of the family Nymphalidae. It is found in the Alps. The species inhabits southern exposed slopes with alpine grassland interspersed with rocks. Screes without vegetation or only a few grass tussocks cannot serve as habitat.

== Taxonomy ==
E. calcaria is a member of the brassy ringlet species complex.

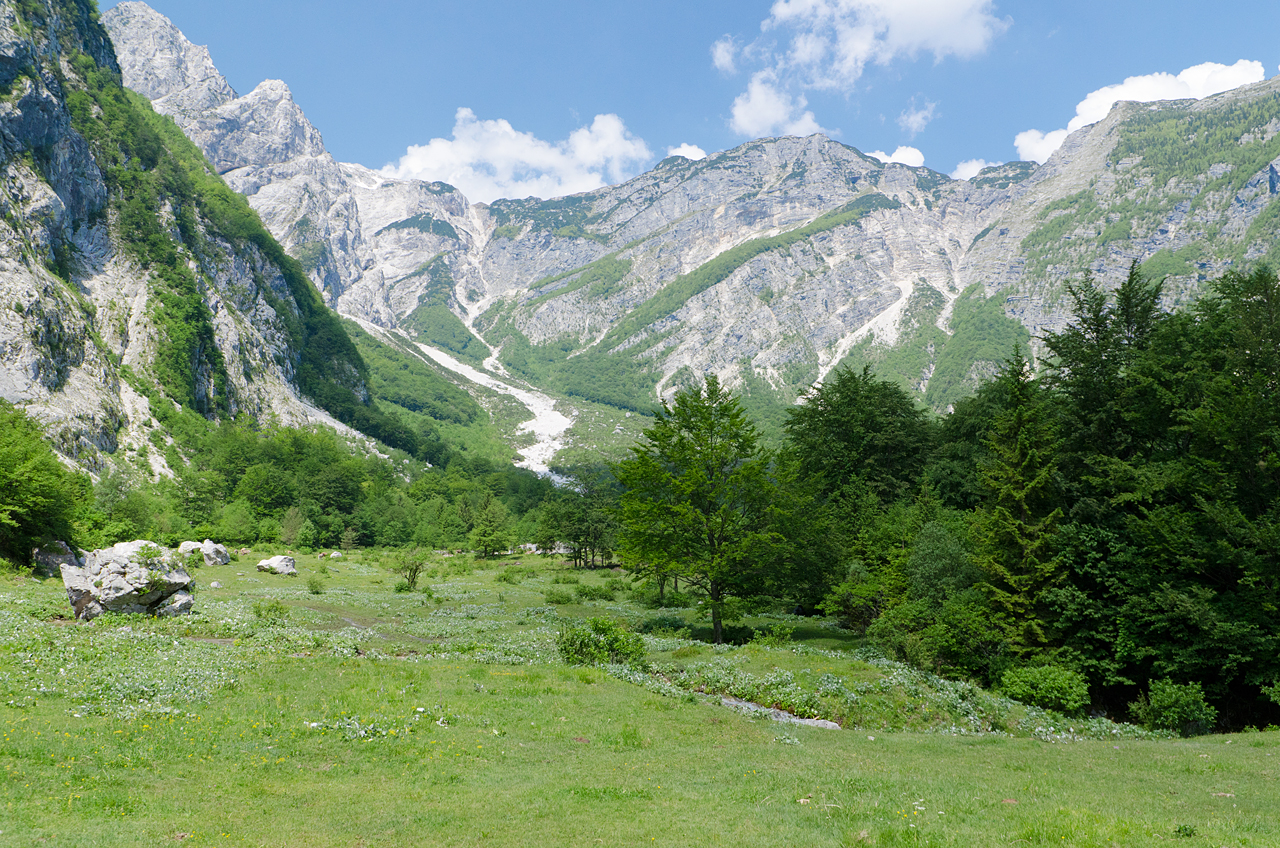
Habitat in Slovenia

== Biology ==
The species is only active when the sun is shining. They fly close to the ground, visiting flowers from time to time and spend much of their time on rocks, resting. The female deposits her eggs on dry grass stalks, just above the ground. The caterpillars feed on Nardus stricta and on various Festuca and Sesleria species.
