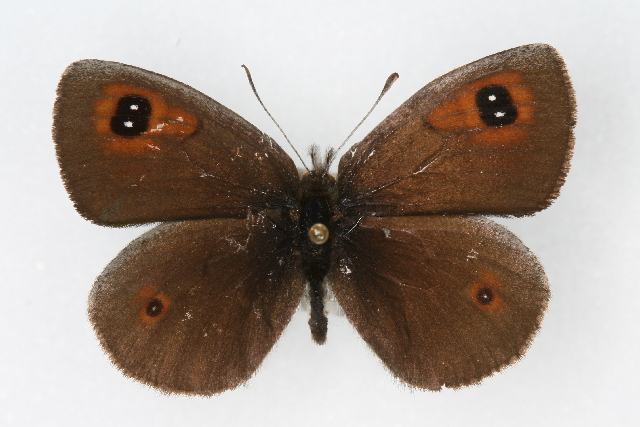
- Upperside
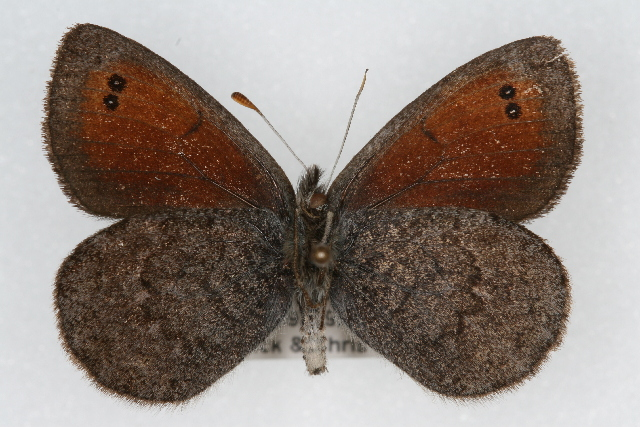
- Underside

Scientific classification
- Kingdom: Animalia
- Phylum: Arthropoda
- Class: Insecta
- Order: Lepidoptera
- Family: Nymphalidae
- Genus: Erebia
- Species: E. callias

Binomial name
- Erebia callias W.H. Edwards, 1871

= Erebia callias =

Colorado alpine

Species of butterfly

Erebia callias, the Colorado alpine, is a member of the Satyridae subfamily of the Nymphalidae butterflies. It is found in alpine areas of Wyoming and Colorado in the U.S. Rocky Mountains as well as various mountain ranges in the eastern Palearctic.

The wingspan is 35–38 mm.

== Subspecies ==
- Erebia callias callias (Rocky Mountains)
- Erebia callias sibirica Staudinger, 1881 (Saur and Tarbagatai Mountains)
- Erebia callias altajana Staudinger, 1901 (Altai Mountains)
- Erebia callias simulata Warren, 1933 (Sayan Mountains)
- Erebia callias tsherskiensis Dubatolov, 1992 (Far East)

== Taxonomy ==
Erebia callias has been lumped as part of the brassy ringlet complex with the Siberian brassy ringlets as they are almost alike morphologically. Though one might suspect stronger differentiation and perhaps marked cryptic speciation across the wide range, the Rocky Mountains population is apparently a very recent isolate. Its ancestors apparently crossed over the Bering Strait at the end of the Wisconsinian glaciation, about 15,000 to 10,000 years ago.
