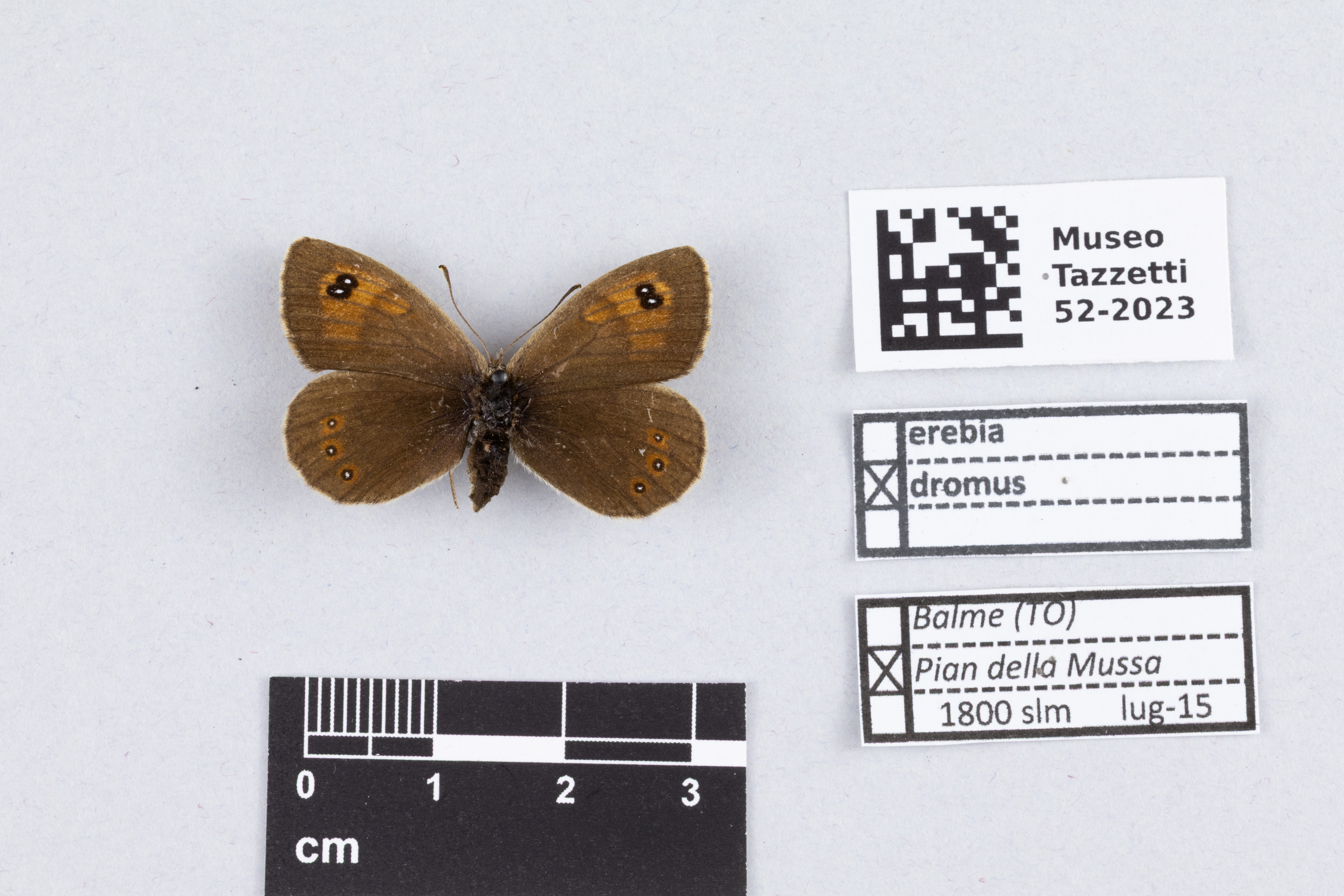
- Erebia dromus Museo Civico Alpino "Arnaldo Tazzetti"
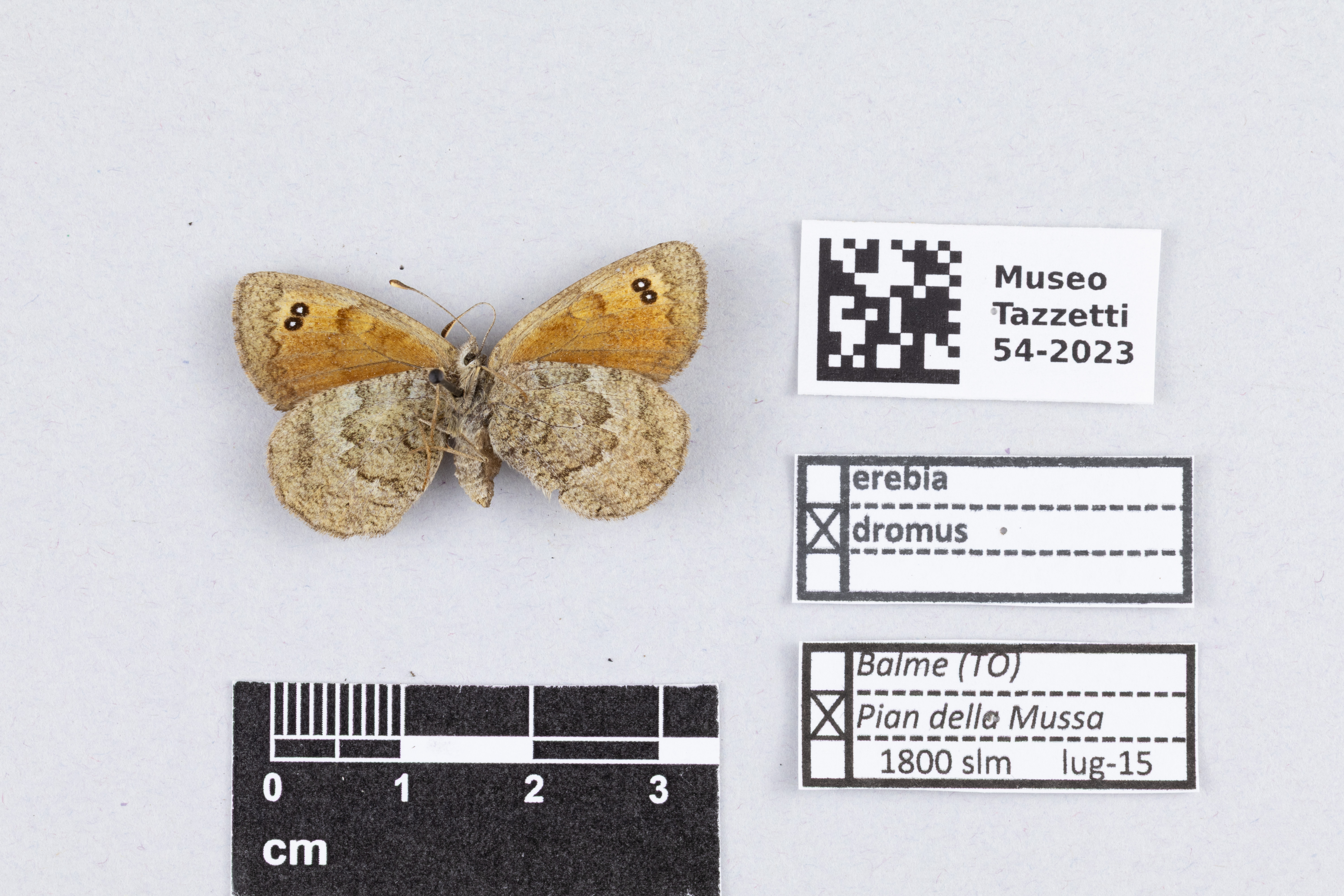

Scientific classification
- Kingdom: Animalia
- Phylum: Arthropoda
- Class: Insecta
- Order: Lepidoptera
- Family: Nymphalidae
- Genus: Erebia
- Species: E. dromus

Binomial name
- Erebia dromus Fabricius, 1793)

= Erebia dromus =

Species of butterfly

Erebia dromus is a member of the subfamily Satyrinae of the family Nymphalidae. It is found in the Alps.In dromus H.-Schaff. (37i) the band of the forewing is broader and lighter [than in Erebia tyndarus] , being more reddish yellow, the 2 subapical ocelli are larger, being mostly confluent and bearing bright white pupils. The band of the hindwing is always present and has 3 smaller ocelli which have nearly always white pupils. The hindwing beneath ashy grey or yellowish grey, but little dusted with brown, the band being obsolete.
