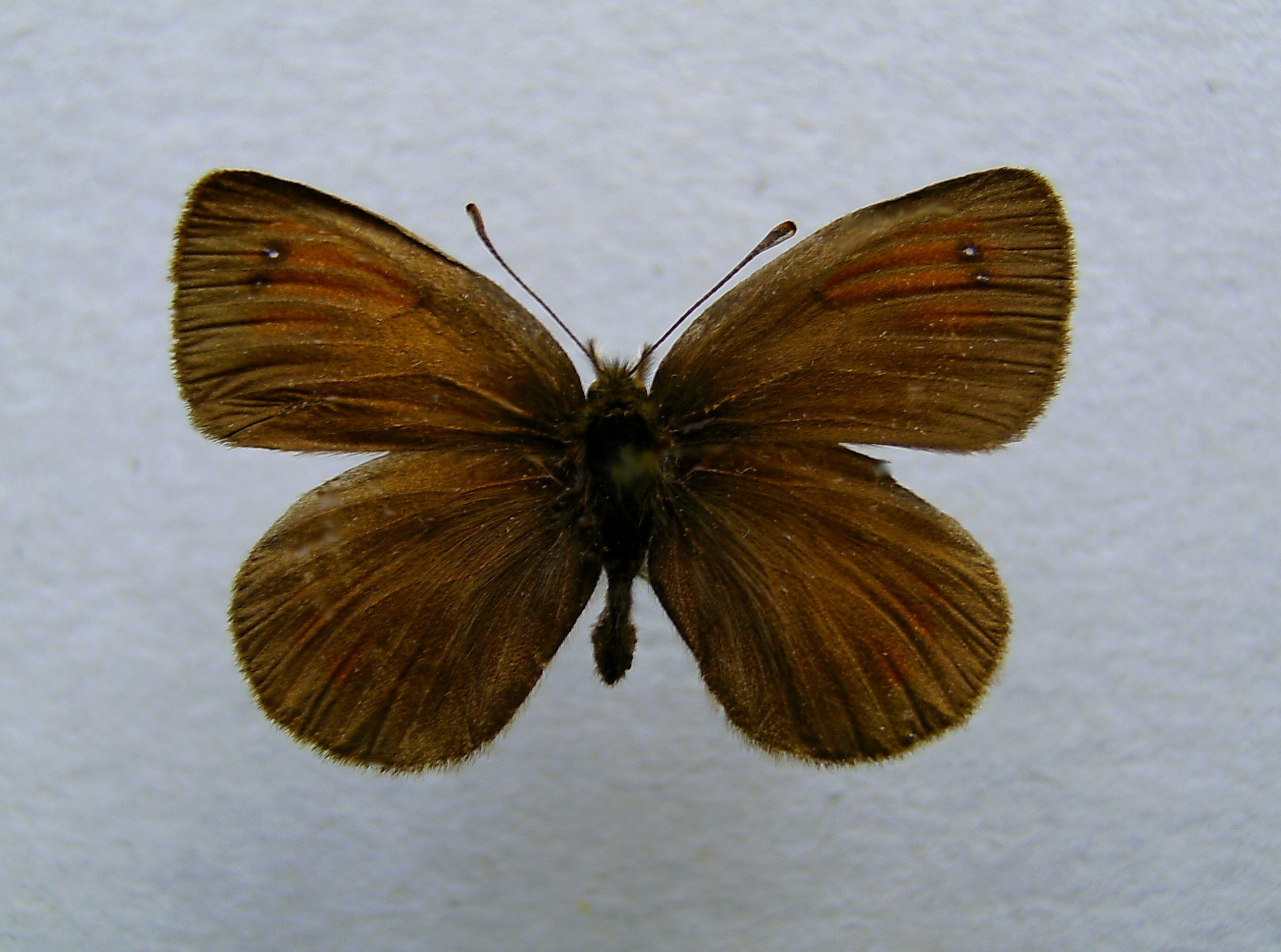

Conservation status
- Near Threatened (IUCN 3.1)

Scientific classification
- Kingdom: Animalia
- Phylum: Arthropoda
- Class: Insecta
- Order: Lepidoptera
- Family: Nymphalidae
- Genus: Erebia
- Species: E. nivalis

Binomial name
- Erebia nivalis Lorković & de Lesse, 1954

= Erebia nivalis =

De Lesse's brassy ringlet

Species of butterfly

Erebia nivalis, or de Lesse's brassy ringlet, is a member of the subfamily Satyrinae of the family Nymphalidae. It is found throughout the Alps of southern Austria with a remote population in central Switzerland.

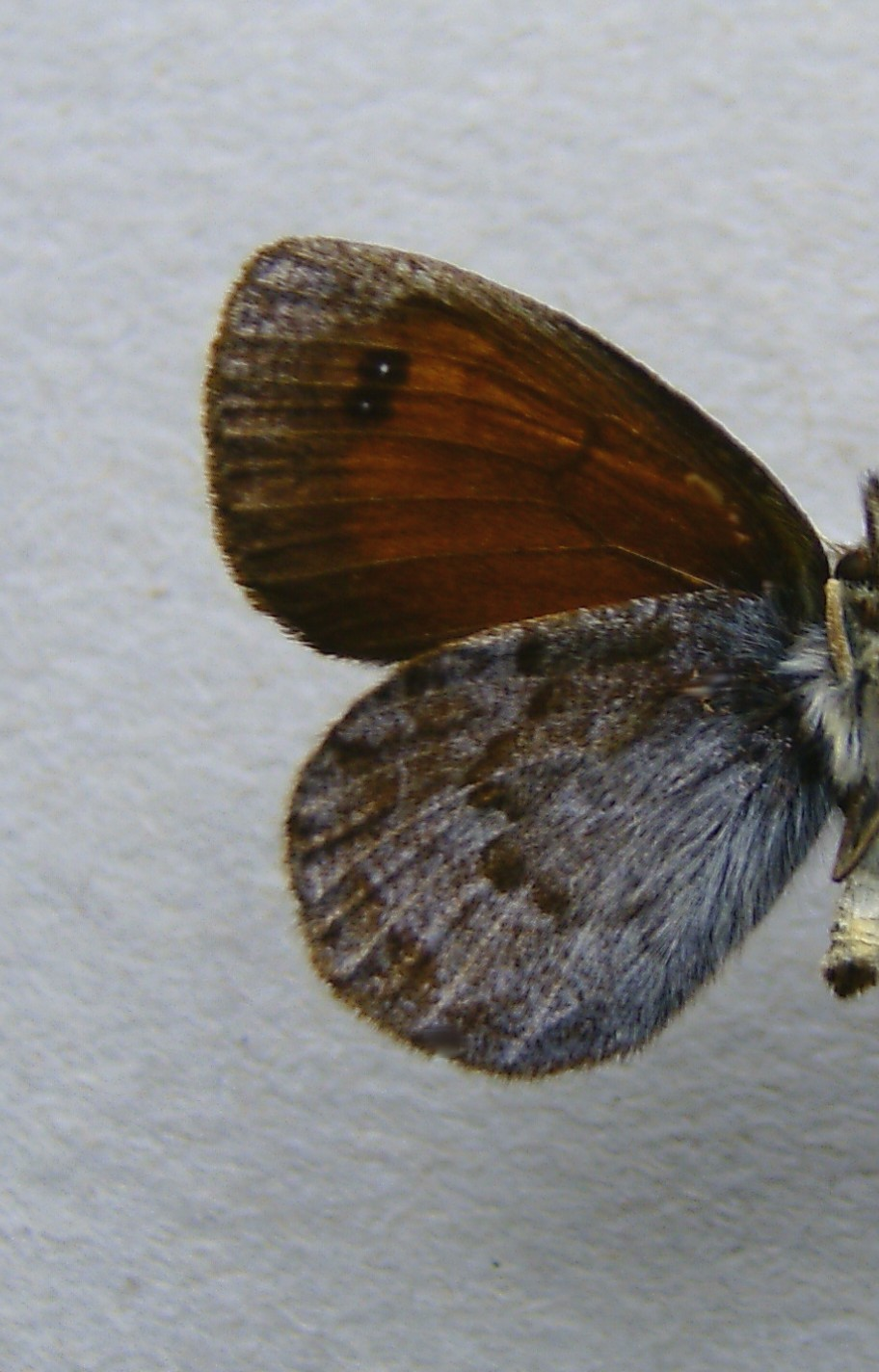
Underside

The wingspan is 34–36 mm. Adults are on wing from mid-July to the beginning of August. Development takes two years.

The larvae feed on various grasses, but mainly Festuca species.

== Taxonomy ==
E. nivalis is a member of the brassy ringlet species complex.
