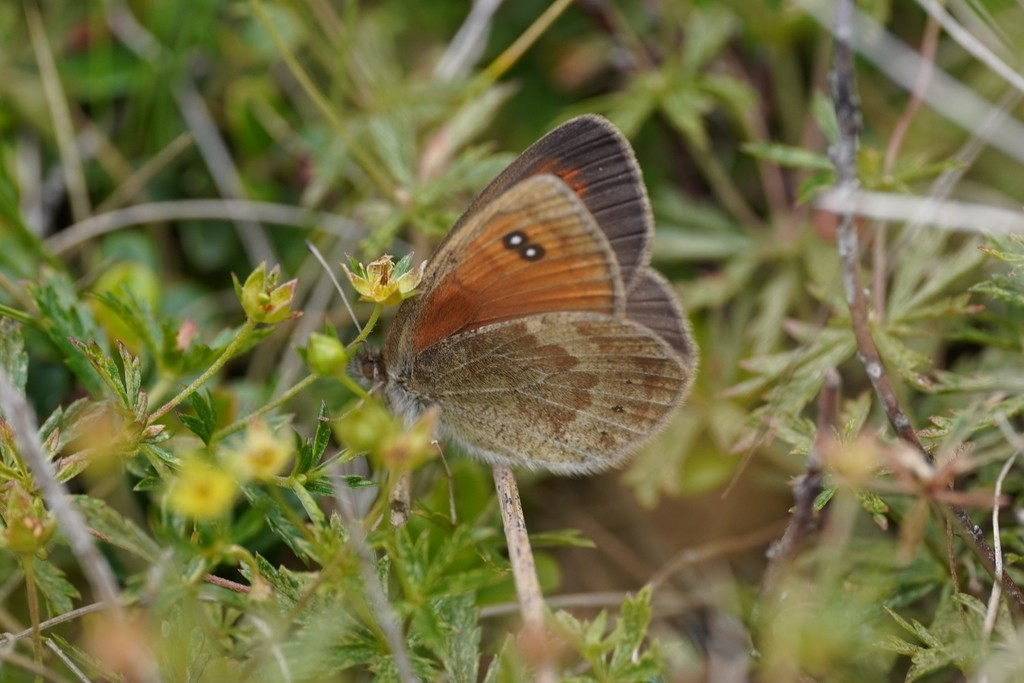

Scientific classification
- Domain: Eukaryota
- Kingdom: Animalia
- Phylum: Arthropoda
- Class: Insecta
- Order: Lepidoptera
- Family: Nymphalidae
- Genus: Erebia
- Species: E. ottomana

Binomial name
- Erebia ottomana Herrich-Schäffer, 1847

= Erebia ottomana =

Species of butterfly

Erebia ottomana is a small butterfly found in the East Palearctic (Greece, Bulgaria, Balkans, Alps, Asia Minor) that belongs to the browns family.

== Description from Seitz ==
Erebia ottomana H.-Schaff. (37 i) is the largest of all the tyndarus forms. Besides the two subapical ocelli the band of the forewing has further back 2 additional small ocelli which are either feebly centred with white or are quite blind. Hindwing beneath uniformly grey. From the Balcan Peninsula, Greece and Armenia, being lately often sold as balcanica .

== Taxonomy ==
Erebia ottomana is a member of the brassy ringlet species complex.

== See also ==
- List of butterflies of Europe
