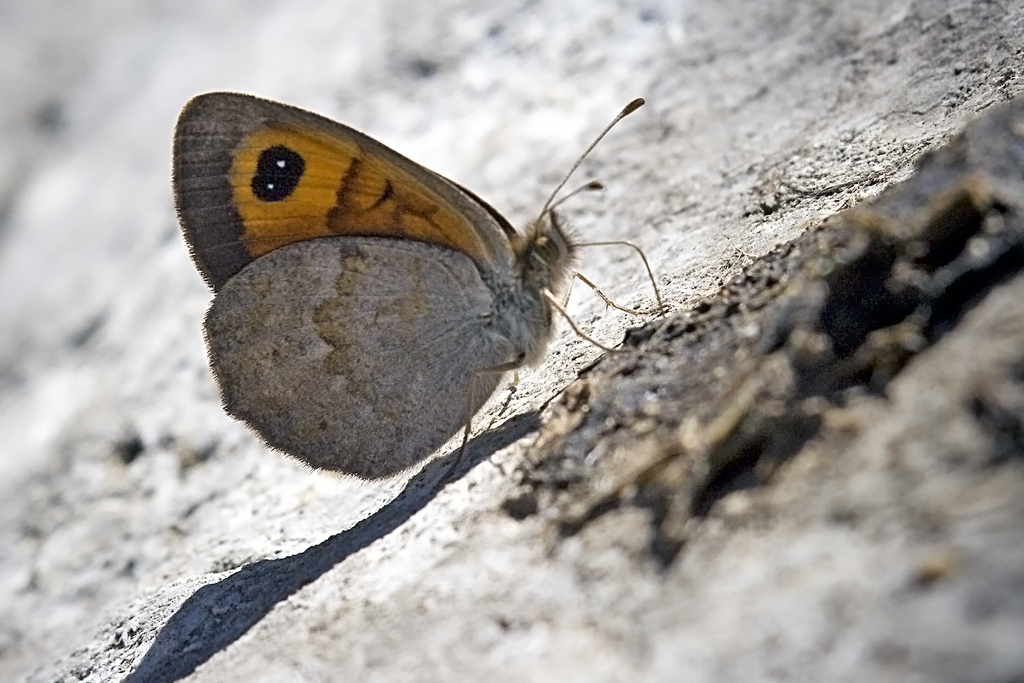

Conservation status
- Near Threatened (IUCN 3.1)

Scientific classification
- Kingdom: Animalia
- Phylum: Arthropoda
- Class: Insecta
- Order: Lepidoptera
- Family: Nymphalidae
- Genus: Erebia
- Species: E. rondoui

Binomial name
- Erebia rondoui Oberthür, 1908

= Erebia rondoui =

Pyrenees brassy ringlet

Species of butterfly

Erebia rondoui, the Pyrenees brassy ringlet, is a species of butterfly in the family Nymphalidae. It is found in France and Spain, where it is endemic to altitudes ranging from 1,650 to 2,300 meters above sea level in the Pyrenees.

The wingspan is 30–32 mm. Adults are on wing from June to August in one generation per year.

The larvae feed on Poa and Festuca species. The species overwinters in the larval stage. Pupation takes place in spring.
