= Zdravko Lorković =

Croatian biologist and entomologist

- Born: 3 January 1900; Zagreb, Kingdom of Croatia-Slavonia, Austria-Hungary (now Zagreb, Croatia)
- Died: 11 November 1998 (aged 98); Zagreb, Croatia
- Occupation(s): entomologist, biologist

Zdravko Lorković (3 January 1900 – 11 November 1998) was a Croatian biologist, entomologist, and geneticist.

Lorković was a professor at the University of Zagreb, where he graduated in biology. He acquired a doctorate in biology in Ljubljana under Jovan Hadži. He studied the nucleus of cells and chromosomes, the origin and evolution of species and ecology.

Lorković was one of the first cytotaxonomists in the world and one of the pioneers of cytotaxonomy, best known for his karyotype studies of butterflies summarised in Lorković 1990 "The butterfly chromosomes and their application in systematics and phylogeny".

Lorković died on 11 November 1998. He is buried in Mirogoj Cemetery.

He was the son of Ivan Lorković, a Croatian politician during its early independence movement, and brother of Mladen Lorković, an Ustaša minister for the fascist and Nazi-collaborationist Independent State of Croatia, notable for his involvement in the Lorković–Vokić plot.
