= Héder (genus) =

Genus (gens) Héder
- Country: Kingdom of Hungary
- Founded: 1140s
- Founder: Wolfer and Héder
- Dissolution: early 14th century
- Cadet branches: a, Kőszegi branch: House of Kőszegi; b, Hédervári branch: House of Hédervári; House of Bokodi

Héder (also Heydrich or Hedrich) was the name of a gens (Latin for "clan"; nemzetség in Hungarian) in the Kingdom of Hungary, several prominent secular dignitaries came from this kindred. The ancestors of the kindred were two German knights from the Duchy of Swabia, brothers Wolfer and Héder. They were granted large-scale domains in Western Hungary. The powerful and influential Hédervári and Kőszegi noble families descended from them.

== Origin ==
..., Volphger, who was descended from the counts of Hemburg, came with his brother Hedricus from Alemannia with three hundred armed horsemen, to whom Duke Geysa made a gift of Mount Kyscen and an island in the Danube near Iaurinum that he might dwell there for ever; here he built a castle of wood, and on the same mountain he founded a monastery, where he is buried. From him and his brother springs the clan of Heder.

— Illuminated Chronicle

... Wolfger and his brother Hedrich come to Hungary from Wildon with forty knights in armour. Wolfger was given Mt. Güssing to settle in. There he built a wooden fort, and later a monks' cloister, where he was buried after his death. The Héder descend from him.

— Simon of Kéza: The Deeds of the Hungarians

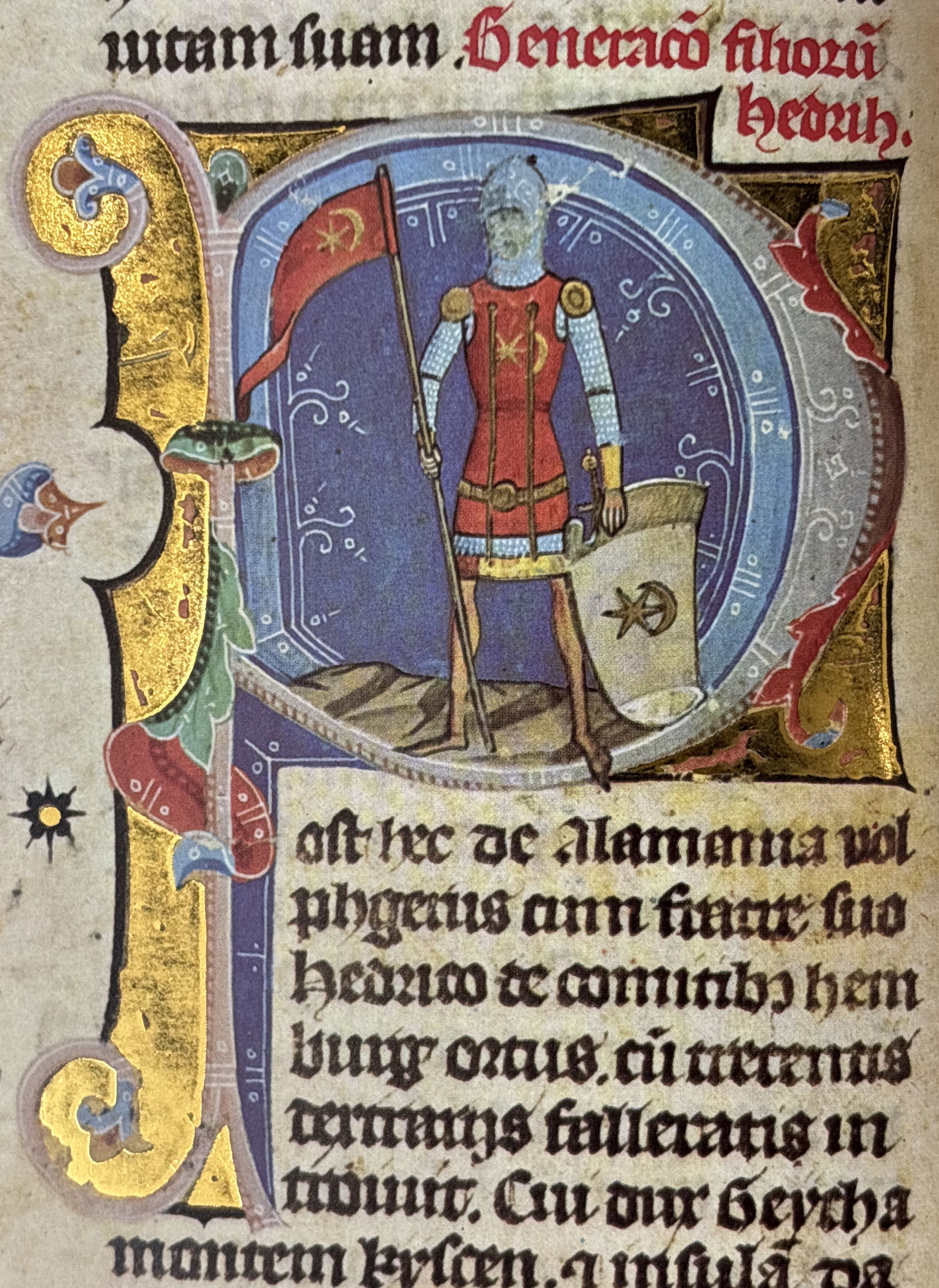
Héder as depicted in the Illuminated Chronicle with false coat of arms

According to the Illuminated Chronicle, Wolfer and Héder belonged to the Counts of Hainburg. Mark of Kalt's work incorrectly – accidentally or intentionally – refers to Grand Prince Géza (c. 972–997), father of Saint Stephen, the first King of Hungary, in fact, Wolfer and Héder arrived to Hungary during the first regnal years of the minor Géza II of Hungary (definitely before 1146). The brothers' place of origin is in dispute. Simon of Kéza's Gesta Hunnorum et Hungarorum writes that Wolfer and Héder came from "Vildonia" with forty armored soldiers, referring to Burgruine Wildon in Styria, however the castle itself was built only after 1157 thus that identification is incorrect. Johannes de Thurocz says in his work Chronica Hungarorum that the two knights originated from Hainburg of "Alemannia", therefore the Duchy of Swabia. Presumably Mark of Kalt's version is closer to the truth, as there was a certain knight Wolfger von Erlach in the first half of the 12th century in Hainburg.

Due to the similarity between forenames within the family, the coat of arms and their frequent church dedications to St. James the Great, the Slovak historian Mária Feješová considers that the Héders presumably originated from the historical region of Picardy in the northwestern part of the Kingdom of France and perhaps they were related to the local Clacy medieval noble family. According to Feješová, knights Wolfer and Héder came to Hungary and permanently settled during the Second Crusade in 1147.

In 1157, Gervasius, Bishop of Győr contributed and permitted the foundation of the Benedictine Abbey of Küszén (later Németújvár, present-day Burg Güssing in Austria), to comes Wolfer, who donated several surrounding lands to the monastery. Gervasius subordinated the monastery to the Pannonhalma Abbey and dedicated the new monastery to Virgin Mary. Both Wolfer and Héder were considered strong confidants of Géza II. Héder was the ancestor of the prestigious Hédervári family, while the infamous Kőszegi family originated from Wolfer. As later the Héder genus was named after Héder and not after his elder brother, historian János Karácsonyi argued that Héder "was more talented than Wolfer or lived a very long time [after his brother's death]". Wolfer was buried in the Küszén Abbey.

Based on Alexander Köcski's seal, the Köcski family was presumably also related to the local powerful Kőszegi family and thus was a scion of the gens Héder too, at least from maternal side. Historian Pál Engel, however, considered that Alexander Köcski individually adopted his seal following his decisive victory over his ardent enemies, the Kőszegis, as a prominent general in Charles I of Hungary's unification war against the oligarchic domains.

== Members and their landholdings ==
=== Wolfer's branch ===
The brothers were granted their coherent and extensive possession from a crown land after the cessation of the "gyepű" border system. Accordingly, the Héders' first lands were part of the so-called "gyepűelve", a mostly uninhabited or sparsely inhabited area beyond the Austrian border, comparable to the modern buffer zones. The clan's lands concentrated mainly in the catchment area of the rivers Rába (Raab) and Lapincs (Lafnitz) in the southwestern part of Vas County at the turn of the 12th and 13th centuries. Most of the lands laid in the valley of stream Strém (or Strem) and centered around the hill of Küszén. According to historian Géza Érszegi, the Héders owned the whole territory between the streams Strém (and thus the parallel Királyút, lit. "King's Road") and Medves, i.e. southeast to Küszén. However, the Héders also owned contiguous lands towards the opposite direction and the mountain of Höheberg (or Hochberg) was considered the northwest border point of their territories.

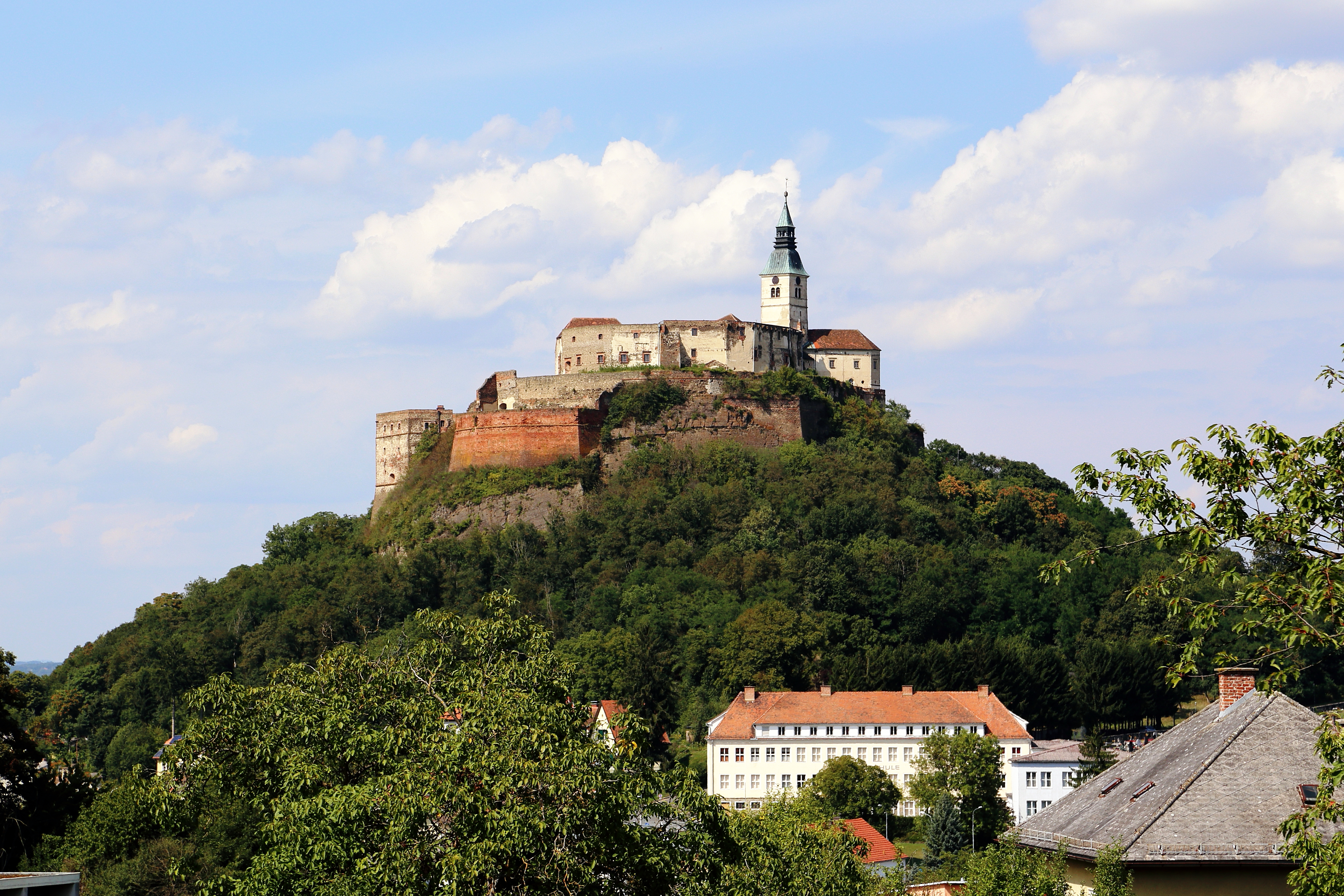
Burg Güssing, which was built by Béla III of Hungary on the pedestal of the short-lived and confiscated Küszén monastery, established by Wolfer in 1157

Béla III of Hungary (r. 1172–1196) confiscated the Abbey of Küszén from the Benedictines and built a royal castle (called Németújvár, or simply Újvár, "New Castle", today Güssing in Austria) on top of the hill in the 1180s. He compensated its patron, comes Hencse I (Wolfer's son, also known as Heinz, Henc or Aenz) with the patronage of the newly constructed abbey of Kapornak in Zala County. Furthermore, Wolfer's descendants remained the owners of the nearby Szentelek and Szentkút (present-day Stegersbach and Heiligenbrunn in Austria, respectively). A document from 1198 refers to the vineyards of Szentkút as the accessory of the newly built castle (Újvár, or Novi Castri). Wolfer's great-grandson, Virunt (or Werenherth), who served as a canon of the cathedral chapter of Győr, still owned Szentkút itself and the surrounding villages, Mérhart, Szombatfalva, Újfalva and Pinka in the middle of the 13th century. In his last will, Virunt bequeathed the villages to Béla IV of Hungary and the Royal Crown, who soon donated them to Herrand, a representative of the Héder clan's other branch. The offspring Hédervári family possessed the area thereafter until its extinction. Beyond the Strém valley, the kindred also owned some lordships, for instance Rábagyarmat and two unidentified estates, Chegge and Podrag. According to a census of the Szentgotthárd Abbey from 1198, family members Simon and Lawrence I owned portions in Szentgotthárd and Battyán (once laid near Nagysimonyi), while Lawrence I, Denis I (from the Hédervári branch) and Hencse I also had interests in Almás. Battyán later was recalled Simonremetefölde (lit. "the land of hermit Simon"), which confirms that Simon became a friar in the last years of his life. Denis and Hencse also owned Pácsony until they donated it to the collegiate chapter of Vasvár sometime before 1217. The local wasteland is still called after Hencse.

Hencse's son, Henry I possessed lands along the river Lendva (Ledava) near the Western border with Austria. He appears in some documents in the period between 1208 and 1212. Henry I and his brother, Michael spent their childhood outside Hungary. It is plausible that Hencse was a supporter of Emeric, King of Hungary during his struggle against his younger brother Andrew. Accordingly, he and his family fled Hungary for Austria in the accompaniment of Constance of Aragon and her son Ladislaus III of Hungary in April 1205, fearing for their lives from Andrew, who abused his role as regent. Sometime later, Henry and Michael returned to Hungary and swore loyalty to Andrew II. It is possible that Hencse died in exile. His returning sons had inherited the right of patronage of the Kapornak Abbey, which was usurped by their some degree of relatives, Fabian and Benz during their absent, when they also plundered the estates of them. They unsuccessfully contested the right for themselves, but Andrew II of Hungary restored Henry and Michael as the rightful owners of the patronage upon their request in 1212. Henry I also owned an estate near Szentbenedek (present-day Kančevci in Slovenia). Michael died sometime after 1212; his widow married Michael Hahót later. Michael's sons, Hencse II and Virunt, and their cousin, Henry II were patrons of the Kapornak Abbey in 1237. Brothers John I and Wolfer II, whose parentage is uncertain, possessed portions in the northeast part of the lordship, near Prosznyákfalva (today a borough in Prosenjakovci, Slovenia). Summarizing, the sporadic data from the end of the 12th century and the beginning of the 13th century clearly state that Wolfer's branch had possessions on the originally uninhabited borderlands, along the lines of defense, or ones close to royal households. The granted possession of Küszén was the part of a larger clan possession covering the whole valley of the stream Strém as far as the Rába, but they also had lands along the Rába near Szentgotthárd and the Mura (Mur) near the estate of the fortress of Felsőlendva (present-day Grad in Slovenia).

The most ambitious and powerful member of the branch was Henry II. He entered the service of Béla IV and had gradually distanced himself from his relatives. Receiving large-scale personal land donations for his military career and loyalty, he was the founder and first member of the Kőszegi family (formerly incorrectly also called Németújvári in historiographical works), which had dominated the northwestern part of Vas County and their lands were arranged around significant fortresses, for instance Borostyánkő, Léka (today Bernstein and Lockenhaus in Austria, respectively) and the eponymous Kőszeg. Henry Kőszegi established his lordship independently of his kinship and did not rely on the clan's formerly acquired landholdings in the opposite parts of Vas County. Henry Kőszegi and his sons had become the dominant power of whole Transdanubia within decades, spreading from their paterfamilias' first acquired lands in Vas County.

=== Héder's branch ===
The younger brother, Héder I was granted lands in the island plain of Szigetköz in Győr County. The centre of his estates, Hédervár was named after him. It emerged into the most important settlement in Szigetköz and became the eponymous village of the influential and powerful Hédervári family. Héder's only known son was Denis I, whose person was first identified by historians Gábor Kiss and Balázs Zágorhidi Czigány (formerly Pál Engel also considered an intermediate generation between Héder and his grandchildren). During the determination of borders of the estate of Novák in 1210, Héder II (Hederic or Hedrich) was referred to as the owner of the neighboring estate, Hédervár (it is also the first mention of the village by contemporary records). Héder II served as ispán of Győr County in 1223. He had two sons, James I and Lawrence III, and a daughter, who married Pousa Bár-Kalán. In 1255, James and Lawrence successfully recovered their sister's dowry from the late Pousa's son, Nana. Lawrence had a son, Héder IV (fl. 1309) and a daughter Margaret, who married Solomon Dárói. After her husband's death, she strove to keep the estate of Déshida (today an area at Lake Deseda) in Somogy County for her daughter, Anne (wife of Stephen Gyovad) in 1309 and 1310. In the presence of her brother, Héder IV, Margaret pledged the land to the distant relative, Henry II Kőszegi, Ban of Slavonia on 23 October 1309. The powerful lord last appeared as a living person in that document. Henry died by 1 May 1310, when Margaret wanted to pay the loan and recover Déshida, according to a document issued by the Somogyvár Abbey four days later. As Nicholas Gutkeled, the envoy of Henry's sons did not bring the redemption certificate, Margaret refused to pay the pledge.

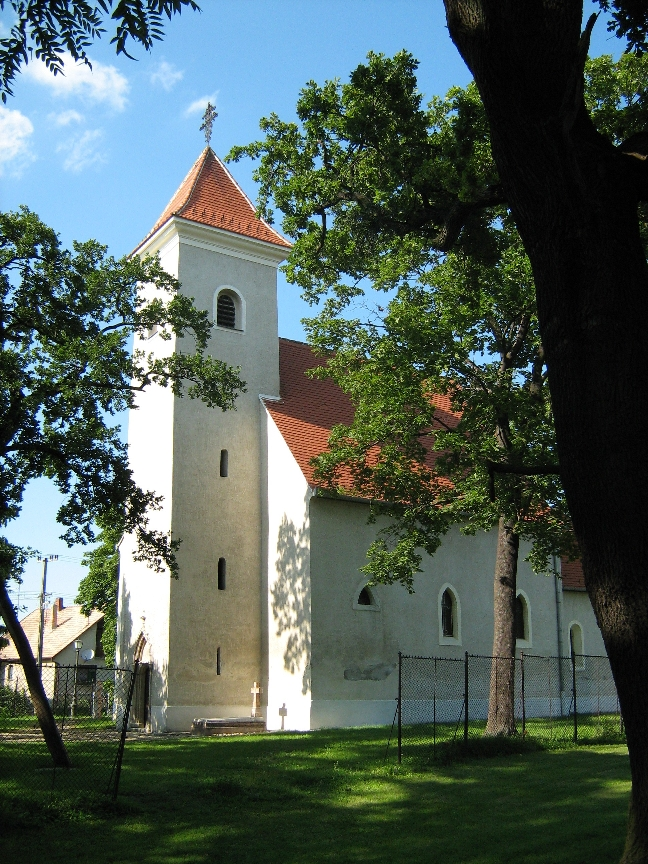
The local parish at Hédervár, erected in the 13th century, burial site of the Héderváris

James married Nabut Monoszló, the daughter of Thomas Monoszló, Ban of Slavonia. James claimed the village of Bokod (today a wasteland in Celldömölk) from himself through his wife, Nabut Monoszló in 1278. He gradually became a familiaris of his powerful relatives, the Kőszegi brothers. In 1269, Henry I Kőszegi and James Héder protested together against the purchase of their relative Héder III's property (see below), so maybe he was already their familiaris at that time. James joined their rebellion in 1278. As a result, Ladislaus IV of Hungary confiscated the village of Fonyó from him in August. James also had familiares during a lawsuit in that year, which reflects his social status. James and Nabut had four sons, Lawrence IV, Egidius, Henry III and Stephen I, who also joined that rebellion, which invited the future Andrew III to the Hungarian throne. Among them, Henry III was further mentioned in February 1284, when his land of Bolda in Vas County was confiscated because of affiliation to the Kőszegi family. Of them, only Lawrence IV had descendants, the Bokodi family. He was still alive in 1311, when sold a portion of Bokod, called Nádszeg to Emeric Káldi from the gens (clan) Herény. His son was Stephen III and grandson was John III, who appeared in a contemporary record in 1336. Stephen's wife was Chuna Szőlősi, a sister of James Szőlősi from the gens (clan) Péc. In October 1336, Stephen and John provided the daughters' quarter from a portion of Bokod to Chuna. It is plausible that they were not related to that Bokodi family, which possessed lands in the region a century later.

Héder's another grandson, Denis II was known only by name, there is no further information about him. He had three sons, Héder III, Herrand and Denis III (also known as the "White-headed"). Héder III married an unidentified daughter of a certain Vekhard. She was the widow of Maurus II Győr. Her husband and their only son, Conrad II both died before 1252. In that year, Héder successfully filed a lawsuit for his wife's dowry against the Győr clan. He functioned as ispán of Hont County in 1269. He acquired the villages of Árpádsoka and Bős (today Gabčíkovo, Slovakia) in 1269. However, the original owner, Lothard Gutkeled, who lost it during the 1260s civil war, reclaimed the estates after the death of Béla IV. Queen Elizabeth the Cuman, the spouse of Stephen V of Hungary, supported his protege in this effort and officially returned the villages to the Gutkeleds. Amid such a political situation, Héder was willing to reach a peaceful agreement and sold Bős and Árpádsoka for 70 marks and also paid 7 marks as a compensation to Lothard in 1271. He last appeared in contemporary records in 1279, when he acted as an arbiter in a lawsuit over the ownership of Gesztence (today a borough in Jánossomorja) between Conrad Győr and a maternal relative, James Bána. Héder had a son, John II, who was a supporter of Stephen V. He fought against the Bohemians, who invaded the Western borderlands of Hungary in April 1273. Therefore, he was granted Dabrony in Veszprém County. Later, he also joined the allegiance of the Kőszegis. He died sometime around 1284; there were some complaints that he unlawfully held a portion of Novák after his lord and relative, Ivan Kőszegi seized it from Conrad Győr. In contrast, Virág Varga argued there is no proof of the Kőszegis' involvement in the case, which was a simple local conflict between two neighboring lords. John took advantage of the opportunity when Conrad Győr gradually moved his seat to Baranya County in the 1280s.

Denis II's second son, Herrand was a long-time partisan of Béla IV. For his military service in the Duchy of Austria, he was granted the landholdings – Szentkút, Mérhart, Szombatfalva, Újfalva and Pinka – of his late relative, canon Virunt by Béla in 1255. Herrand served as Master of the horse from 1262 to 1270, while also held the ispánates of Trencsén, then Moson counties. He regained influence after the death of Stephen V, holding various positions in the queenly court. Today's Mesteri once was called Hernádmesteri after him. Herrand had three sons and a daughter. Dominic was mentioned in 1268 and 1269. Thanks to his father's exploits, he was granted the village Enese (Szerdahely) near Moson Castle by Béla IV. James II handed his lands in Moson County – Oroszvár, Szerdahely (present-day Rusovce and Dunajská Streda in Slovakia, respectively), Csütörtökhely and Rajka, over to King Andrew III in 1297, in exchange for the castle of Monyorókerék (today Eberau in Austria) and its accessories in Vas County. His new seat laid near the lordship of Németújvár (Güssing), therefore historian János Karácsonyi argued he entered the service of the Kőszegis by that time. In contrast, Virág Varga considered that Andrew III was embroiled in conflict with the Kőszegis in the previous year, August–November 1296. The exchange was perhaps disadvantageous for James II, while his former estates (especially Oroszvár) were considered important strongholds in the military defense system of Pozsony County. It is also possible that James was a local ally of the Hungarian king in the region and was placed near the Kőszegis as a direct outpost. James II' son John IV and grandson Stephen III died without descendants sometime before 1371. Herrand's third son, Nicholas I died in 1326; he donated Bekény (near Egyházashetye) to his familiares, Peter and Lawrence Intai in his last will and testament. This was approved by his closest relatives, the sons of Denis (III). Nicholas died without male descendants. Herrand's only daughter, Elizabeth married to Gregory Rumi from the Tengerdi kinship.

Through his sons, Denis (III) the White-headed became forefather of the prestigious Hédervári family. Both the descendants of Desiderius and Nicholas II bore the Hédervári surname. Desiderius was first mentioned in 1285, when he was granted the land of Bodak in Csilizköz (Medzičiližie; today a southern region of Žitný ostrov in Slovakia). Abandoning the forced alliance with the Kőszegis, he became an ardent partisan of Charles I of Hungary, as a result lost several lands temporarily during the clashes against the Kőszegi family. He sacrificed his life to enable the king's escape during the disastrous Battle of Posada in November 1330. Nicholas II served as ispán of Győr County from 1324 to 1330. The Héderváris' main branch ascended from him, which survived the Middle Ages and flourished until the late 17th century.

== Family tree ==
- Wolfer I (fl. 1157) → Kőszegi branch
  - Hencse I (fl. 1196–98)
    - Henry I (fl. 1208–12)
      - Henry II (fl. 1237–74†), first member of the Kőszegi family
    - Michael (fl. 1212)
      - Hencse II (fl. 1233–37)
      - Lawrence II (fl. 1233)
      - Virunt (fl. 1233–37)
  - (?) Simon (fl. 1198)
  - (?) Lawrence I (fl. 1198)
    - (?) John I (fl. 1208)
    - (?) Wolfer II (fl. 1198–1208)
  - (?) N
    - (?) Fabian (fl. 1212)
    - (?) Benz (fl. 1212)
- Héder I (fl. 1146–64) → Hédervári branch
  - Denis I (fl. 1198)
    - Denis II
      - Héder III (fl. 1252–79) ∞ daughter of Vekhard
        - John II (fl. 1274–84)
      - Herrand (fl. 1255–76)
        - Dominic (fl. 1268–69)
        - James II (fl. 1297)
          - John IV (died before 1371)
            - Stephen III (died before 1371)
        - Nicholas I (fl. 1326†)
        - Elizabeth ∞ Gregory Rumi
      - Denis III ("the White-headed")
        - Desiderius (fl. 1285–1330†), ancestor of the Hédervári family
        - Nicholas II (fl. 1309–30†), ancestor of the Hédervári family
        - Andrew (fl. 1324–26†)
    - Héder II (fl. 1210–23)
      - James I (fl. 1255–78) ∞ Nabut Monoszló
        - Lawrence IV (Bokodi; fl. 1278–1311)
          - Stephen II (fl. 1336) ∞ Chuna Szőlősi
            - John III (fl. 1336)
        - Egidius (fl. 1278)
        - Henry III (fl. 1278–89)
        - Stephen I (fl. 1278)
      - Lawrence III (fl. 1255)
        - Héder IV (fl. 1309)
          - Ladislaus
            - Anne (fl. 1394) ∞ Peter Bocskai
        - Margaret (fl. 1309–10) ∞ Solomon Dárói
      - a daughter (fl. 1255) ∞ Pousa Bár-Kalán

== Sources ==
=== Primary sources ===
- Simon of Kéza: The Deeds of the Hungarians (Edited and translated by László Veszprémy and Frank Schaer with a study by Jenő Szűcs) (1999). CEU Press. ISBN 963-9116-31-9.
- The Hungarian Illuminated Chronicle: Chronica de Gestis Hungarorum (Edited by Dezső Dercsényi) (1970). Corvina, Taplinger Publishing. ISBN 0-8008-4015-1.

=== Secondary sources ===
- Engel, Pál (1996). Magyarország világi archontológiája, 1301–1457, I. [Secular Archontology of Hungary, 1301–1457, Volume I] (in Hungarian). História, MTA Történettudományi Intézete. ISBN 963-8312-44-0.
- Feješová, Mária (2020). "Hederikovci z Kyseku a Modry [Hederiks from Kysek and Modra]". In Weinbergerová, Mária; Velička, Drahomír (eds.). Archívny almanach (ročnik III.) (in Slovak). Spolok Pro Archivis. pp. 29–37. ISBN 978-80-972999-2-7.
- Horváth, Richárd (2015). "A favár rejtélye, avagy mennyire régi Újvár vára?: Németújvár várának "vélelmezett" története a kezdetektől a 13. század végéig [The Mystery of the Wooden Fort, or How Old is Újvár?: The "Presumed" History of the Castle of Németújvár from the Beginning to the End of the 13th Century]". Castrum (in Hungarian). 18 (1–2). Castrum Bene Egyesület: 5–24. ISSN 1787-1093.
- Karácsonyi, János (1901). A magyar nemzetségek a XIV. század közepéig. II. kötet [The Hungarian genera until the middle of the 14th century, Vol. 2] (in Hungarian). Hungarian Academy of Sciences.
- Kiss, Gábor; Zágorhidi Czigány, Balázs (2012). "A Héder nemzetség korai birtokai Vas vármegyében és a küszéni bencés apátság [The Foundation of the Benedictine Abbey in Küszén and the Early Possessions of the Héder Family in Vas County]". In Illés, Pál Attila; Juhász-Laczik, Albin (eds.). Örökség és küldetés. Bencések Magyarországon (Rendtörténeti konferenciák 7/1) (in Hungarian). Magyar Egyháztörténeti Enciklopédia Munkaközösség (METEM). pp. 172–180. ISBN 978-963-9662-60-5.
- Mályusz, Elemér (1971). Az V. István-kori geszta [The Gesta of the Age of Stephen V]. Akadémiai Kiadó.
- Markó, László (2006). A magyar állam főméltóságai Szent Istvántól napjainkig: Életrajzi Lexikon [Great Officers of State in Hungary from King Saint Stephen to Our Days: A Biographical Encyclopedia] (in Hungarian). Helikon Kiadó. ISBN 963-208-970-7.
- Rudolf, Veronika (2023). Közép-Európa a hosszú 13. században [Central Europe in the Long 13th Century] (in Hungarian). Arpadiana XV., Research Centre for the Humanities. ISBN 978-963-416-406-7.
- Varga, Virág (2023). "A Héder nembeli Héderváriak társadalmi helyzete a 13–14. század fordulóján [The Social Status of the Hédervári Family of the Héder genus at the Turn of the 13–14th Centuries]". In Hunyadi, Sándor; et al. (eds.). Micae Mediaevales XII (in Hungarian). Eötvös Loránd University. pp. 133–155. ISSN 2062-2198.
- Wertner, Mór (1895). "A Güssingiek [The Güssingers]". Századok (in Hungarian). 29 (1 & 2). Magyar Történelmi Társulat: 42–64, 136–154. ISSN 0039-8098.
- Zsoldos, Attila (2011). Magyarország világi archontológiája, 1000–1301 [Secular Archontology of Hungary, 1000–1301] (in Hungarian). História, MTA Történettudományi Intézete. ISBN 978-963-9627-38-3.
