= Henry I Kőszegi =

Hungarian lord

Henry (I) Kőszegi
- Lord of Kőszeg
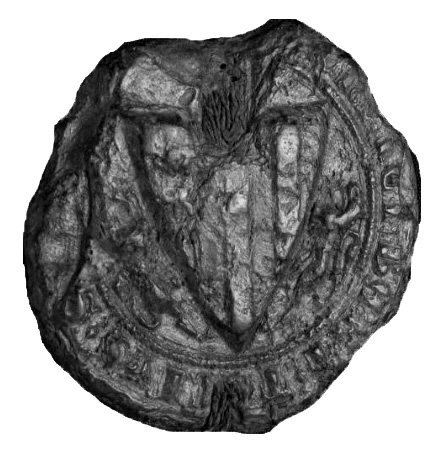
- Seal of Henry Kőszegi, Ban of Slavonia in 1273

Palatine of Hungary
- Reign: 1260–1267
- Predecessor: Roland Rátót
- Successor: Lawrence, son of Kemény
- Died: 26–29 September 1274; Polgárdi, Hungary
- Noble family: House of Kőszegi
- Spouses: 1, unknown 2, unknown (uncertain); 3, N von Lichtenburg (1270–1272)
- Issue: Nicholas I Ivan; Peter; Henry II a daughter
- Father: Henry Héder

Henry (I) Kőszegi from the kindred Héder (Hungarian: Héder nembeli (I.) Kőszegi Henrik, Croatian: Henrik II. Gisingovac, German: Heinrich II. von Güns; died 26/29 September 1274), commonly known as Henry the Great, was a Hungarian influential lord in the second half of the 13th century who was the founder and first member of the powerful Kőszegi family. Henry was one of the most notable earlier "oligarchs" who ruled de facto independently their dominion during the era of feudal anarchy.

In his early career, Henry was the most loyal supporter of King Béla IV, who drifted into a civil war with his son and heir, Duke Stephen. After the death of Béla IV in 1270, Henry went into exile to Bohemia. Stephen V died suddenly in 1272 and so Henry was able to return to Hungary. He became a central figure in the internal conflicts between the rival baronial groups. He brutally massacred Béla of Macsó in November 1272 and later also kidnapped the six-year-old Duke Andrew in July 1274. Henry was killed in the Battle of Föveny in September 1274. Historography in the 19th century incorrectly referred to him as Henry of Németújvár (or Güssing).

== Ancestry and early life ==
Henry Kőszegi was born in the late 1210s into the gens (clan) Héder, which originated from two German knights, Wolfer and Héder, who came from Hainburg in the Duchy of Swabia to the Kingdom of Hungary during the reign of Géza II of Hungary, according to the Illuminated Chronicle, which preserved the narration of Henry's contemporary, the chronicler Ákos. Other works present different origin theories, Simon of Kéza's Gesta Hunnorum et Hungarorum writes that the brothers came from "Vildonia", referring to Burgruine Wildon in Styria, however the castle itself was built only after 1157 thus that identification is incorrect. Johannes de Thurocz says in his work Chronica Hungarorum that the two knights originated from Hainburg of "Alemannia", therefore the Duchy of Swabia. Majority of the historians accept the version presented by Ákos and the Illuminated Chronicle.

Henry's father was Henry (I), the grandson of the elder brother, Wolfer (died around 1157), founder of the Benedictine Abbey of Küszén (later Németújvár, present-day Burg Güssing in Austria). The landholdings of Henry, Sr. laid along the river Lendva (Ledava) near the Western border with Austria. He appears in some documents in the period between 1208 and 1212. He possessed the right of patronage of the Benedictine Abbey of Kapornak too. Henry (II) was the only known son of him. By name, he is first mentioned by a contemporary record in 1237, along with his cousins, Hencse II and Virunt (or Werenherth), when they were co-patrons of the Kapornak Abbey (thus Henry, Sr. was definitely deceased by then).

== King Béla's partisan ==
=== Rise to power ===
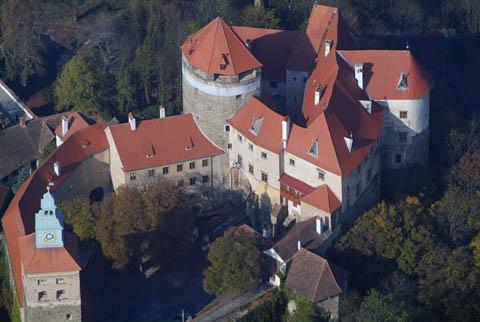
Burg Schlaining (Szalónak), built by Henry Kőszegi sometime before 1270

Henry's early career is largely unknown. According to historian Jenő Szűcs, he belonged to Béla IV's accompaniment, who fled Hungary through Transdanubia, escaping from the invading Mongols after the disastrous Battle of Mohi in 1241. It is possible that the young Henry, whose inherited lands laid in the escape route along the Austrian border, entered court service there and remained a member of the escort in Dalmatia, where Béla and his family took refugee in the well-fortified towns on the coast of the Adriatic Sea. Without any doubt as to his identity, Henry first appears in contemporary documents in 1244, when he was made ispán of Vas County. He held the position at least until December 1245 (but it is plausible he served in this capacity until 1247). During his service, Béla IV entrusted him and Heimo, the bishop of Vác, to investigate and supervise previous royal land grants occurred in Vas County. Thereafter, he functioned as ispán of Somogy County from 1247 to 1260. Meanwhile, Henry became one of the most powerful barons of the realm, when he was appointed Judge royal in 1254, the second most prestigious office in the royal court. He held the dignity until June/November 1260. His deputy was vice-judge royal Nicholas Tengerdi at least from 1256. Henry participated in the royal campaign in the summer of 1260, when Béla and his allies invaded Moravia, but Ottokar II vanquished them in the Battle of Kressenbrunn on 12 July 1260. The defeat forced Béla to renounce Styria in favor of the King of Bohemia in the Peace of Vienna, which was signed on 31 March 1261.

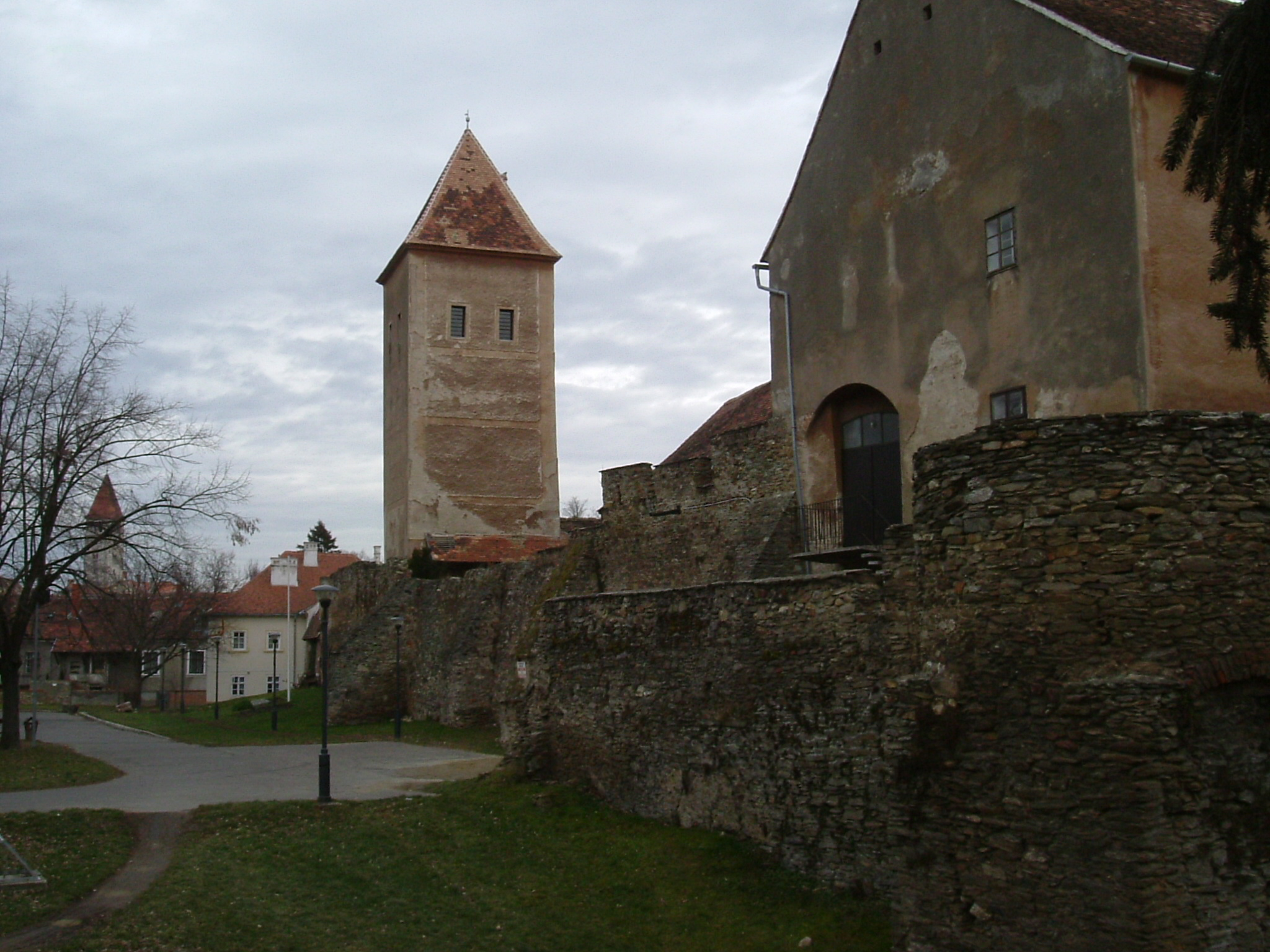
The medieval wall of Kőszeg Castle, built and owned by Henry Kőszegi and his descendants

Vas County became the centre and territorial base for his future expansions and acquisitions of landholdings in all directions throughout Western Transdanubia, which elevated into a large-scale contiguous and coherent territorial province by the end of the 13th century. It was Henry, who built the castles of Szentvid and Szalónak (present-day Stadtschlaining, Austria) in the county. Receiving large-scale personal land donations for his military career and loyalty in the upcoming decades, he was the founder and first member of the Kőszegi family (formerly incorrectly also called Németújvári or Güssingi in historiography), which had dominated the northwestern part of Vas County and their lands were arranged around significant fortresses, for instance Borostyánkő (today Bernstein in Austria) and the eponymous Kőszeg, which was developed into an advanced trading town under Henry's domination, who granted town privileges to the settlement and moved his permanent residence there after a construction of a well-fortified castle. With Béla's support and generous donations, Henry Kőszegi established his lordship independently of his kinship and did not rely on the clan's formerly acquired landholdings in the opposite parts of Vas County. Henry Kőszegi and his descendants had become the dominant power of whole Transdanubia within decades, spreading from their paterfamilias' first acquired lands in Vas County. By 1270, Henry owned the forts of Kőszeg, Szentvid, Szalónak, Borostyánkő, Kertes (Pinkakertes, today a borough of Eberau, Austria), in addition to the castles of the late "Farkas of Zagorje" and possibly Léka (today Lockenhaus in Austria). However, Henry never possessed the fort of Németújvár (Burg Güssing) in his lifetime; it was regained only by his son, Ivan for the Héder clan after almost a century, in the early 1280s. Thus the earlier Hungarian historiographical efforts to call the family as "Németújváris" or "Güssingis" (and also "Küszinis") is unfounded and anachronistic; nevertheless, they are still appear as "Güssingers" in German-language academic works. In contemporary records, they were referred to as "generacio Heyderici" (1265) or "genus Heydrich" (1279).

Henry Kőszegi had four sons from his unidentified wife. Nicholas I and the aforementioned Ivan were also elevated into high dignities during the age of the late Árpáds, while Peter served as the Bishop of Veszprém from 1275 till his murder in 1289. They were born roughly in the 1240s. Historian Attila Zsoldos argues, the fourth son, Henry II was much more younger than his brothers (thus born possibly in the second half of the 1250s); he first appeared in contemporary records more than a decade after the first mention of his brothers, who exerted active political and military activity by then. Zsoldos considers Henry II was born from a potential second marriage of his father. Henry also had a daughter whose name has been lost, who married Demetrius Csák, Count of Bakony and was the mother of Dominican friar, Blessed Maurice Csák. She later entered the Dominican nuns of Margaret Island.

=== Palatine of Hungary ===
Henry Kőszegi replaced Béla's another faithful partisan, Roland Rátót as Palatine of Hungary and ispán of Pozsony County in the autumn of 1260. During his tenure, Henry performed his judicial powers in the western part of Hungary. Pursuing his predecessor activity in Northwest Hungary, he judged over lawsuits in Pozsony, Győr and Zala counties in 1260 and 1261. He also became the owner of Modor (present-day Modra, Slovakia). During that time tensions emerged between King Béla IV and his eldest son Stephen. Béla's favoritism towards his younger son, Béla (whom he appointed Duke of Slavonia) and daughter, Anna irritated Stephen, who was proved to be more skilled and capable military leader than his father. Their deteriorating relationship caused a civil war lasting until 1266. After a brief conflict, Béla IV and his son divided the country and Stephen received the lands to the east of the Danube in 1262, who also adopted the title of junior king. Because of the war conditions, Henry was not able to exercise his judicial powers and only four known charters were preserved during the remaining period of his term as Palatine.

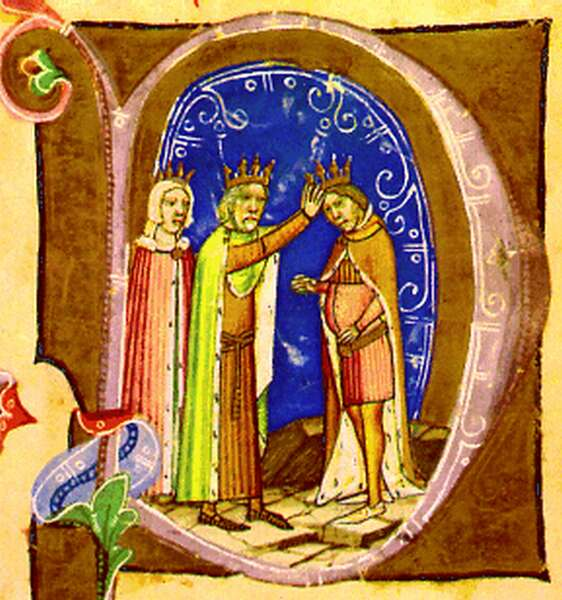
Stephen V is crowned by his father, Béla IV (from the Illuminated Chronicle)

The relationship between father and son remained tense, and the reconciliation of Stephen and his father was only temporary. The junior king seized and confiscated the domains of his mother and sister, Anna, which were located in the lands under his rule. Béla IV's army crossed the Danube under Anna's command sometime after the autumn of 1264, which marked the beginning of the civil war between father and son. Henry Kőszegi was one of the staunchest supporters of Béla during the conflict and gradually rose to prominence in the royal council thereafter. Historian Attila Zsoldos considers Henry acted as actual general of the royal troops under the nominal command of Duchess Anna, which consisted the northern corps of Béla's royal army during the civil war. Nevertheless, Anna's army occupied the fort of Patak (ruin near Sátoraljaújhely) and captured Stephen's wife, Elizabeth the Cuman and children, including the future Ladislaus IV. Thereafter, Henry and his troops began to besiege and occupy Stephen's castles one after another in the eastern parts of Upper Hungary, while a small unit recovered Anna's formerly confiscated estates in Bereg County. After the fall of Patak, Duke Stephen sent his faithful soldier Peter Csák to the northern parts of the junior king's realm, who successfully besieged and regained the fort of Baranka (today ruins in Ukraine) from Henry's troops.

Simultaneously, a detachment of the royal army, under the command of Béla's Judge royal Lawrence, son of Kemény forced Duke Stephen to retreat as far as the fortress at Feketehalom (Codlea, Romania) in the easternmost corner of Transylvania. The king-junior's partisans relieved the castle and he started a counter-attack in the autumn against Henry's army in Northern Hungary, who presumably received no news of the defeat of Lawrence's besiegers. Because of the prolonged siege of Feketehalom (which, in fact, failed by then) Henry Kőszegi sent a skillful military general Ernye Ákos with an army of Cuman warriors to Tiszántúl, in order to support the besiegers and, later, to hinder Duke Stephen's counter-offensive. The battle took place somewhere west of Várad (present-day Oradea, Romania) in February 1265. Ernye suffered a serious defeat and was himself captured by the enemy, Peter Csák's army. Henry's main army was forced to retreat to the center of the kingdom thereafter, as Stephen's army crossed the Tisza at Várkony and marched into Transdanubia.

According to Jans der Enikel, a contemporary Austrian chronicler, Henry's army consisted of the whole royal army of Béla IV, complemented by an auxiliary troops of 1,000 men under the leadership of Henry Preussel, the rector of Buda, who was sent to the scene by Béla's spouse, Queen Maria. Anna's son, Béla of Macsó was appointed nominal general of the royal army, with his lieutenants Henry Kőszegi and Henry Preussel, but the effective leadership remained in Henry Kőszegi's hands. Stephen and his army gained a decisive victory over his father's army in the Battle of Isaszeg in March 1265. Béla of Macsó was able to flee the battlefield, while Henry Kőszegi was taken prisoner by a young courtly knight, Reynold Básztély, who knocked the powerful lord out of the horse's saddle with his lance and captured him on the ground. Henry Preussel was also captured alive following the battle, however he was executed shortly afterwards. Two of Henry's sons, Nicholas and Ivan were also captured (they first appear in contemporary document in this battle). Alongside other captives, the three fettered Kőszegis were presented in Stephen's ducal court shortly after the clash. Henry and his sons were being held as prisoners and after the Battle of Isaszeg, Béla IV was forced to accept the authority of Stephen in the eastern parts of the kingdom. On 23 March 1266, father and son confirmed the peace in the Convent of the Blessed Virgin on 'Rabbits' Island and Henry and his two sons, alongside others, were released from captivity.

=== Ban of Slavonia ===
After his release, Henry was dismissed as Palatine of Hungary and ispán of Pozsony County around February 1267. Nevertheless, he retained his influence at the royal court during the transition months. During the civil war in Hungary, Stephen's vassal, Despot Jacob Svetoslav submitted himself to Tsar Constantine Tikh of Bulgaria. In the summer of 1266, Stephen invaded Bulgaria, seized Vidin, Pleven and other forts and routed the Bulgarians in five battles. The ban, Roland Rátót also participated in a campaign against the Second Bulgarian Empire. However, despite the former agreement, Roland soon became a political victim of the rivalry between Béla IV and Stephen. Under the "influence of loyal barons' intrigues", as a later document notes, King Béla dismissed Roland and replaced him with Henry Kőszegi. His estates were also plundered and destroyed in Slavonia. Henry Kőszegi first appears in this dignity in early September 1267, and thus he became also a tutor and viceroy of the young Béla, who was still styled as Duke of Slavonia. Béla and Stephen together confirmed the liberties of the "royal servants", from then on known as noblemen, in the summer of 1267. Henry was among the barons, who were present in Esztergom, then Óbuda (September) during that time. According to historian Attila Zsoldos, it was, in fact, a military mobilization and Henry was among the barons, who advocated a next war against Duke Stephen. However, the mobilized royal servants were not enthusiastic about another internal conflict, instead they demanded the recognition of their rights and privileges from Béla, and the name of the absent duke was included in the charter at their request.

As Ban of Slavonia, Henry Kőszegi continued his predecessors' activity and minted his own marten-adorned silver denarius in whole Slavonia, the so-called banovac or banski denar. His coins, with the initials "h-R", were minted in the royal mintage at Zagreb (in present-day Croatia), thus also called "denarius zagrabiensis". It is plausible that Henry acquired the above-mentioned castles of "Farkas of Zagorje", possibly including Krapina (Korpona), in Varaždin County during his term as ban. King Béla's favorite son, Duke Béla of Slavonia reached adulthood and started to govern his duchy from 1268, subordinating Henry. However, the young Béla died in the summer of 1269. Henry's patron Béla IV also died on Rabbits' Island on 3 May 1270.

== Exile ==
After Béla's death, Duchess Anna seized the royal treasury and fled to Bohemia. Stephen arrived to Buda within days. He nominated his own partisans to the highest offices; Henry Kőszegi was replaced as Ban of Slavonia by Joachim Gutkeled. Nevertheless, it is plausible that Henry attended the coronation of Stephen V and formally swore an oath of allegiance to the new monarch on 17 May. The castles and estates along the Austrian border became a buffer zone due to the constant threat by Ottokar's expansionist ambitions. After his coronation, Stephen V met Ottokar II near Pressburg (present-day Bratislava, Slovakia), where they concluded a truce. After that, he resided in Vas County and attempted to reconcile his late father's old partisans, including Henry Kőszegi and Lawrence Aba, and appointed royal castellans to the border forts due to the threat of war with Bohemia. However, one of the local lords, Nicholas Hahót garrisoned Styrian soldiers in his fort at Pölöske, and made plundering raids against the nearby villages. Stephen's intention to avoid confrontation with the pro-Béla Western Transdanubian lords was thwarted by Nicholas Hahót's insurgency. Although his rebellion was crushed within days by late November, Zsoldos argues the revolt and its suppression resulted that, instead of peaceful conciliation, several lords, who possessed lands along the border, including Henry Kőszegi and his sons, Lawrence Aba and Nicholas Geregye, followed Duchess Anna into exile to Bohemia and handed their castles to Ottokar II, who placed the treasonous nobles under his protection. Henry Kőszegi handed over altogether seven castles, all of them laid along the border of Hungary with Ottokar's realms. Around the same time, the royal archers of Vas County also pledged allegiance to Henry, who thus entered the service of the Bohemian king.

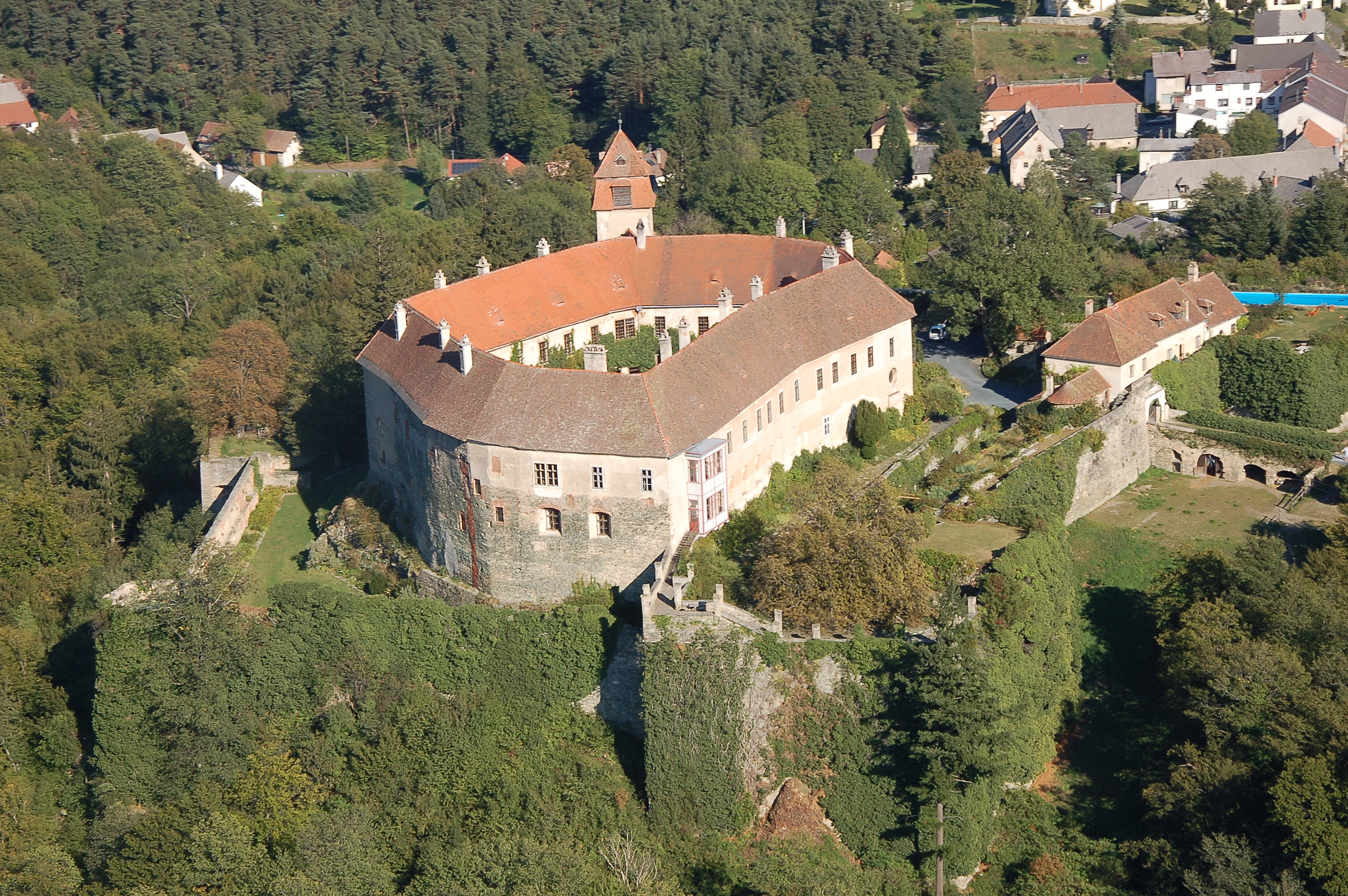
Bernstein Castle (Borostyánkő), one of the forts in Western Hungary that Henry Kőszegi handed over to Ottokar II of Bohemia in the autumn of 1270

The Hungarian monarch, who saw the power machinations and aspirations of Ottokar behind Hahót's revolt, launched a plundering raid into Austria around 21 December 1270. The raid escalated into war by the spring of 1271, when Ottokar invaded the lands north of the Danube in April 1271 and captured a number of important fortresses in Upper Hungary. Ottokar routed Stephen at Pressburg on 9 May, and at Mosonmagyaróvár on 15 May, but Stephen won the decisive battle on the Rábca River on 21 May. The two kings' envoys reached an agreement in Pressburg on 2 July. According to their treaty, Stephen promised that he would not assist Ottokar's opponents in Carinthia, and Ottokar renounced the castles he and his partisans held in Hungary. Though the Bohemian king renounced its claims on territories conquered in Hungary, the Kőszegis, strengthening with Bohemian and Styrian defenders, refused to give back their castles along the western border. As a result, royal general Gregory Monoszló led a royal army to successfully besiege and capture Henry Kőszegi's four castles (Kőszeg, Szentvid, Szalónak and Borostyánkő) in August 1271.

Henry Kőszegi spent his two-year exile at the Bohemian court in Prague, from 1270 to 1272. During that time, he married an unidentified daughter of the late powerful Bohemian lord, Smil von Lichtenburg (Czech: Smil z Lichtenburka) in 1270. Ottokar II donated him the fort of Laa with the surrounding district. With the marriage, Henry instantly became a member of the Bohemian aristocracy and entered the service of Ottokar II under the Germanic law. Following Stephen's victory in the 1271 war, Ottokar II withdrew his support from the Kőszegis and the other defected lords. According to their treaty, Henry Kőszegi could keep his possessions in Bohemia and Austria, as long as he did not attempt to recover his possessions in Hungary. Stephen V refrained from granting amnesty to the emigrated lords, including Henry, so he did not have the opportunity to return to his homeland.

Ban Joachim Gutkeled kidnapped Stephen's ten-year-old son and heir, Ladislaus and imprisoned him in the castle of Koprivnica in the summer of 1272. Stephen besieged the fortress, but could not capture it. The king fell ill and was taken to the Csepel Island. He died on 6 August 1272. Joachim Gutkeled departed for Székesfehérvár as soon as he was informed of Stephen V's death, because he wanted to arrange Ladislaus' coronation. Stephen's widow, Elizabeth the Cuman joined him, infuriating Stephen V's partisans who accused her of having conspired against her husband. A prominent baron, Egidius Monoszló, laid siege in late August to the Dowager Queen's palace in Székesfehérvár to "rescue" Ladislaus from the rival baronial group's influence, but his action ended in failure as the Gutkeled troops routed his army after some clashes and bloodshed. As an Austrian chronicler wrote, Egidius, "fear of the Queen's revenge", fled to Pressburg, alongside his brother, Gregory. They captured the castle and its surrounding areas and handed over to Ottokar II who provided shelter to them. The Monoszló brothers were granted castles in Austria by Ottokar, who also commissioned them to administrate Pressburg and the adjacent forts. Moreover, among the donated forts was Laa, which Henry received as a donation two years earlier. This favorable treatment infuriated Henry Kőszegi, who was overshadowed in the Bohemian court by then and he waited in vain for the king to recover his lost castles in Hungary. As a result, he decided to return Hungary and joined Elizabeth and Joachim's baronial group, despite the former ancient hostilities. He and his sons fled Prague in the autumn of 1272; Henry banished his Moravian wife and unilaterally annulled his marriage.

== Feudal anarchy ==
=== Royal assassin ===
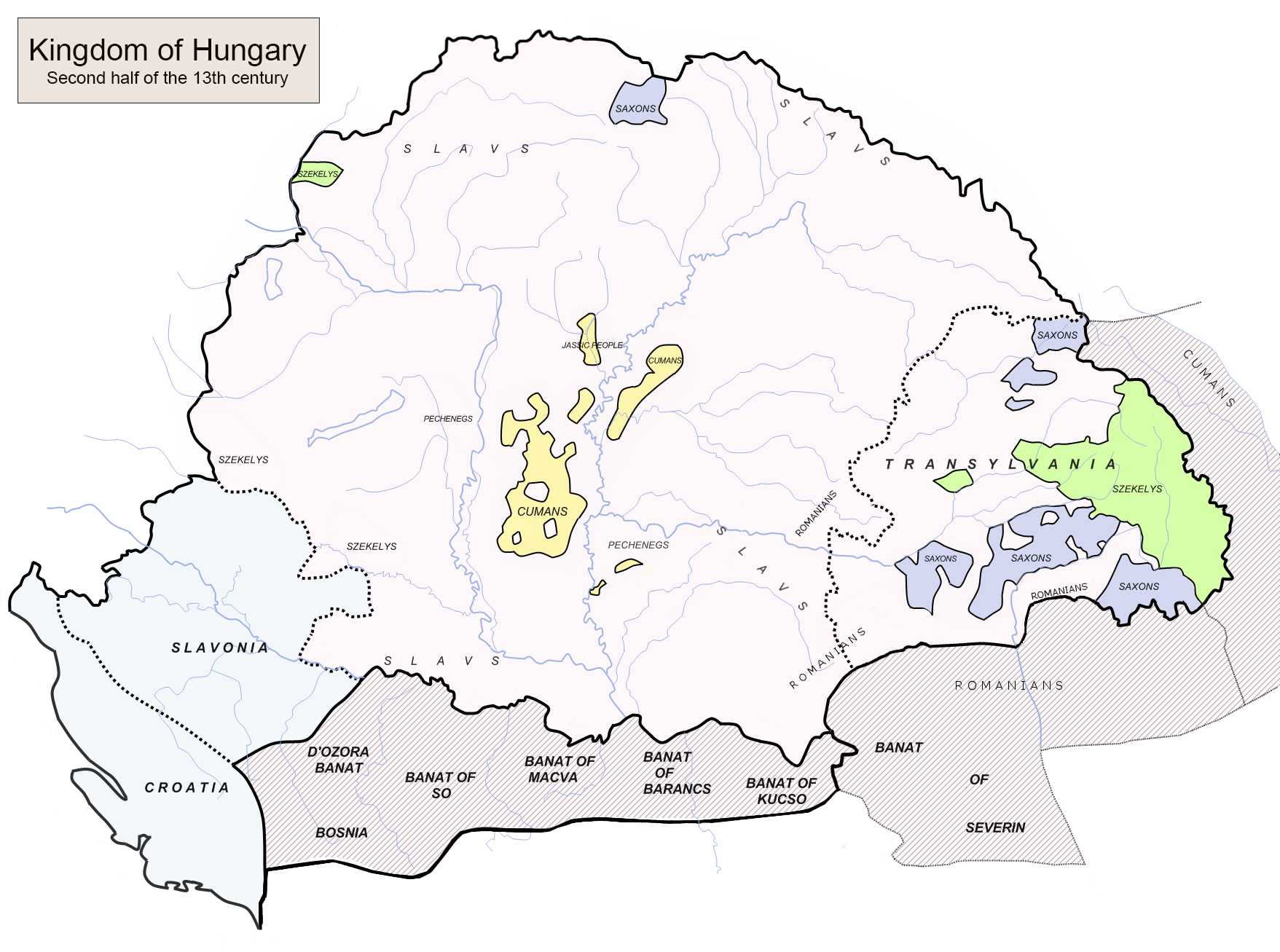
Kingdom of Hungary (including the banates) in the second half of the 13th century

Ladislaus IV was crowned king in Székesfehérvár on about 3 September 1272. In theory, the 10-year-old Ladislaus ruled under his mother's regency, but in fact, baronial parties administered the kingdom, who fought against each other for supreme power. Henry Kőszegi arrived to Hungary in early November. He asked for audience at the royal court in Buda and swore loyalty to the queen regent. Despite his previous betrayal, his welcome was cordial, Henry received forgiveness from Elizabeth and the Kőszegis' confiscated lands were regained. However, he did not get an office or dignity in the royal council. Béla of Macsó, who governed the southern provinces of the Kingdom of Hungary, also appeared in the royal court in order to demand more power, direct and respectful influence in the affairs of the realm. By that time, he was the closest and only adult male relative of the young king in Hungary. Elizabeth and the royal council convened a summit to the Dominican convent on 'Rabbits' Island by mid-November. Henry Kőszegi also attended the event. Following a sharp dispute, he and his retinue brutally assassinated Duke Béla. Henry drew his sword and slew the young prince, leaving no chance for resistance or the intervention of Béla's partisans. The lord and his companion continued the beastly act even after Béla's body, plunged with countless deadly wounds, fell to the floor. They furiously chopped the corpse into pieces, which later the Dominican nuns (including Béla's sister Margaret and niece Elizabeth) could barely collect.

Henry's act was the second assassination against a member of the Hungarian royal family after Queen Gertrude's murder in 1213. Together with Ladislaus' kidnapping by Joachim Gutkeled a few months earlier, it marked the beginning of a new era in the Kingdom of Hungary, called "feudal anarchy", which lasted until the 1320s and was characterized by the crisis of royal authority, constant struggles for power and the emergence of oligarchic territorial provinces. Henry Kőszegi had multiple motivations for deliberate preparation for murder. The intensity and brutality of the murder is indicated by personal anger that has escalated since the Battle of Isaszeg, when Béla managed to flee the battlefield, leaving behind his lieutenants, including the captured Henry. During the meeting, Henry accused Béla of treason, who presumably contacted with Ottokar II through his mother Duchess Anna, who was still residing in Prague, to stabilize the domestic political crisis. Despite their lese-majesty and the personal presence of Queen Elizabeth and the minor Ladislaus, Henry and his accomplices were free to leave the crime scene. Béla of Macsó was, in fact, in the path of every aspirant baronial groups (including the queen regent), as he was the only capable male adult member of the dynasty. As a result, no retaliation followed the assassination, which strengthened Henry Kőszegi's political positions. Béla's province, the rich and extensive Duchy of Macsó was divided among the members of the leading noble families within two weeks. Henry became Ban of Ban of Ozora and Só in this process (present-day Usora and Soli in northern Bosnia and Herzegovina, respectively), holding both dignities until the end of March 1273.

=== Struggle for power ===
Immediately after the assassination, Henry Kőszegi has made an alliance with Joachim Gutkeled and the Geregye brothers, forming one of the two main baronial groups, while the other one was dominated by the Csák and Monoszló clans. During the nominal regency of Queen Elizabeth the Cuman, both sides wished to take part in the exercise of power. The rivalry between the two parties characterized the following years. According to historian Bálint Hóman, twelve "changes of government" took place in the first five regnal years of Ladislaus IV. As historian Jenő Szűcs analyzed, the elderly honored barons, who were made palatines and other chief officials during that time, such Denis Péc, Ernye Ákos and Roland Rátót were functioned as stable points and "beauty spot" in the fast-changing governments. Henry Kőszegi, despite his relative low dignities, was considered one of the most influential men in the Kingdom of Hungary at turn of 1272 and 1273. Initially, Henry and Joachim were affiliated with Queen Elizabeth against the late Stephen's supporters (especially the Csáks), but, soon, they expelled the queen mother and her courtiers from power and her regency remained only nominal. Replacing Matthew Csák, Henry Kőszegi was made Ban of Slavonia in May 1273. He held the dignity until his death. His deputy, the vice-ban of Primorje (Latin: vices gerens pro bano maritimo) was Paul Šubić, who later ruled over most of Dalmatia, Slavonia and Bosnia. As Ban of Slavonia, Henry Kőszegi sent a letter to the burghers of Trogir urging them to elect his preferred candidate Thomas as their bishop in 1274.

In retaliation for Hungarian incursions into Austria and Moravia, Ottokar's troops invaded the borderlands of Hungary in April 1273. The Bohemian army captured Győr and Szombathely, plundering the western counties. The barons of the realm have temporarily made peace and installed a "national unity government" around June to successfully suppress the enemy. Joachim Gutkeled recaptured the two aforementioned forts two months later, while Denis Péc fought with a Bohemian rearguard near Győr in August. Henry Kőszegi became leader of the royal army, which carried out a raid into the surroundings of Pressburg, which was still seized by Ottokar. His troops defeated the Bohemian army at Laa in August. According to the Annals of Klosterneuburg, Henry, along with his sons Nicholas and Ivan, sneaked into Austria amid the ceasefire with his army. At his approach, the Bohemian army, with Ottokar, retreated behind the walls of Laa. Henry's troops looted the surrounding town for two days. During the breakout attempts of the Bohemians, several clashes took place. Ulrich von Dürnholz, the captain of Carinthia and Ottokar's son-in-law was killed during one of these fights. Finally, Ottokar's army drove the Hungarians out from Austria on the third day. In a second wave of the Bohemian invasion, Ottokar's army recaptured Győr and seized many fortresses, including Sopron in the autumn. Although, Henry Kőszegi successfully prevented the advance of the Bohemians along the river Vág (Váh), large-scale territories and counties remained under the suzerainty of Ottokar and the war had been brought to an end without truce of peace treaty. The cooperation of baronial parties lasted only a few months. By October 1273, the Kőszegi–Gutkeled–Geregye baronial group took control over the country, ousting the Csák kindred. Abolishing the balance of power between the two rivaling groups, the Kőszegis and their allies expelled several members of the royal council and established a homogeneous "party government" in late 1273, as Szűcs called in his monograph.

Matthew Csák and his allies removed Voivode Nicholas Geregye from power in early June 1274, but Henry Kőszegi and the Gutkeled brothers were able to retain their positions, although their homogeneous government was terminated. Fearing the rival group's gradual advancement in the previous weeks, Joachim Gutkeled and Henry Kőszegi captured Ladislaus IV and his mother near Buda at the end of June 1274. They restored the homogeneous government thereafter, while the young monarch and Queen Elizabeth were practically held under house arrest. Although Peter Csák liberated the king and his mother in a short time, the two powerful lords, Henry Kőszegi and Joachim Gutkeled captured Ladislaus' younger brother, Andrew, and took him to Slavonia, the centre of their political basis. They demanded Slavonia in Duke Andrew's name and intended to utilize the young prince as "anti-king" against his elder brother, who came under the influence of the Csáks by then. During their journey to the southern province, the royal army led by Peter Csák and Lawrence Aba chased and caught them still in Transdanubia. The pro-Ladislaus troops defeated their united forces in the Battle of Föveny (or Bökénysomló), near present-day Polgárdi in the days between 26 and 29 September 1274. Henry Kőszegi was killed in the skirmish, while Joachim Gutkeled managed to survive. Henry's sons, Nicholas and Ivan also fled the battlefield, withdrawing their troops to the borderlands between Hungary and Austria. Thereafter Peter Csák with the consent of Ladislaus IV gathered an army against the Kőszegis' domain in the autumn of 1274; they marched into Western Hungary, pillaging the brothers' landholdings. Nicholas and Ivan barricaded themselves in the castle of Szalónak. The royal army besieged the fort, but failed to capture it because of the coming winter. Through Henry's ambitious and unscrupulous sons, the Kőszegi family survived their paterfamilias' death and, despite the past crimes, was able to return to power in the spring of 1275.

== Sources ==
- Kádár, Tamás (2009). "Egy rejtélyes politikai gyilkosság és háttere a XIII. század végi Magyarországon: Béla macsói és boszniai herceg pályája [A Mysterious Political Murder and its Background at the End of 13th Century in Hungary: Career of Béla, Duke of Macsó and Bosnia]". Fons. 16 (4). Szentpétery Imre Történettudományi Alapítvány: 411–429. ISSN 1217-8020.
- Kiss, Gábor; Zágorhidi Czigány, Balázs (2012). "A Héder nemzetség korai birtokai Vas vármegyében és a küszéni bencés apátság [The Foundation of the Benedictine Abbey in Küszén and the Early Possessions of the Héder Family in Vas County]". In Illés, Pál Attila; Juhász-Laczik, Albin (eds.). Örökség és küldetés. Bencések Magyarországon (Rendtörténeti konferenciák 7/1) (in Hungarian). Magyar Egyháztörténeti Enciklopédia Munkaközösség (METEM). pp. 172–180. ISBN 978-963-9662-60-5.
- Markó, László (2006). A magyar állam főméltóságai Szent Istvántól napjainkig: Életrajzi Lexikon [Great Officers of State in Hungary from King Saint Stephen to Our Days: A Biographical Encyclopedia] (in Hungarian). Helikon Kiadó. ISBN 963-208-970-7.
- Rudolf, Veronika (2023). Közép-Európa a hosszú 13. században [Central Europe in the Long 13th Century] (in Hungarian). Arpadiana XV., Research Centre for the Humanities. ISBN 978-963-416-406-7.
- Szőcs, Tibor (2014). A nádori intézmény korai története, 1000–1342 [An Early History of the Palatinal Institution: 1000–1342] (in Hungarian). Magyar Tudományos Akadémia Támogatott Kutatások Irodája. ISBN 978-963-508-697-9.
- Szűcs, Jenő (2002). Az utolsó Árpádok [The Last Árpáds] (in Hungarian). Osiris Kiadó. ISBN 963-389-271-6.
- Zsoldos, Attila (2007). Családi ügy: IV. Béla és István ifjabb király viszálya az 1260-as években [A family affair: The Conflict between Béla IV and Junior King Stephen in the 1260s] (in Hungarian). História, MTA Történettudományi Intézete. ISBN 978-963-9627-15-4.
- Zsoldos, Attila (2010). "A Henrik-fiak: A Héder nembéli Kőszegiek "családi története" [The Henry Sons: The "Family History" of the Kőszegis from the Kindred Héder]". Vasi Szemle (in Hungarian). 64 (6): 651–661. ISSN 0505-0332.
- Zsoldos, Attila (2011). Magyarország világi archontológiája, 1000–1301 [Secular Archontology of Hungary, 1000–1301] (in Hungarian). História, MTA Történettudományi Intézete. ISBN 978-963-9627-38-3.

Henry I House of Kőszegi Born: 1210s Died: 26/29 September 1274
Political offices
Preceded by Paul Geregye	Judge royal 1254–1260	Succeeded by Lawrence, son of Kemény
Preceded by Roland Rátót	Palatine of Hungary; 1260–1267	Succeeded by Lawrence, son of Kemény
Preceded by Roland Rátót	Ban of Slavonia; 1267–1270	Succeeded by Joachim Gutkeled
New title	Ban of Ozora and Só; 1272–1273	Succeeded by Ernye Ákos
Preceded by Matthew Csák	Ban of Slavonia; 1273–1274	Succeeded by Denis Péc
