= Wolfer =

German knight (died 1158–1161)

- Died: 1158–1161
- Buried: Küszén Abbey (Burg Güssing)
- Noble family: gens Héder
- Issue: Hencse I (?) Simon (?) Lawrence I

Wolfer or Wolfger (also Walfer; died between 1158 and 1161) was a German knight possibly from the Duchy of Swabia, who, alongside his brother Héder, settled down in the Kingdom of Hungary and became a member of the Hungarian nobility. Wolfer was also co-founder of the prestigious Héder clan and ancestor of the powerful and infamous Kőszegi family, which ruled whole Transdanubia at the peak of its power.

== Arrival to Hungary ==
..., Volphger, who was descended from the counts of Hemburg, came with his brother Hedricus from Alemannia with three hundred armed horsemen, to whom Duke Geysa made a gift of Mount Kyscen and an island in the Danube near Iaurinum that he might dwell there for ever; here he built a castle of wood, and on the same mountain he founded a monastery, where he is buried. From him and his brother springs the clan of Heder.

— Illuminated Chronicle

... Wolfger and his brother Hedrich come to Hungary from Wildon with forty knights in armour. Wolfger was given Mt. Güssing to settle in. There he built a wooden fort, and later a monks' cloister, where he was buried after his death. The Héder descend from him.

— Simon of Kéza: The Deeds of the Hungarians

According to the Illuminated Chronicle, Wolfer and Héder belonged to the Counts of Hainburg. Mark of Kalt's work incorrectly – accidentally or intentionally – refers to Grand Prince Géza (c. 972–997), father of Saint Stephen, the first King of Hungary, in fact, Wolfer and Héder arrived to Hungary during the first regnal years of the minor Géza II of Hungary (definitely before 1146, when Héder was already mentioned as ispán). The brothers' place of origin is in dispute. Simon of Kéza's Gesta Hunnorum et Hungarorum writes that Wolfer and Héder came from "Vildonia" with forty armored soldiers, referring to Burgruine Wildon in Styria, however the castle itself was built only after 1157 thus that identification is incorrect. Johannes de Thurocz says in his work Chronica Hungarorum that the two knights originated from Hainburg of "Alemannia", therefore the Duchy of Swabia. Presumably Mark of Kalt's version is closer to the truth, as there was a certain knight Wolfger von Erlach in the first half of the 12th century in Hainburg.

As later the Héder clan was named after Héder and not after his elder brother, historian János Karácsonyi argued that Héder "was more talented than Wolfer or lived a very long time [after his brother's death]".

== Life in Hungary ==
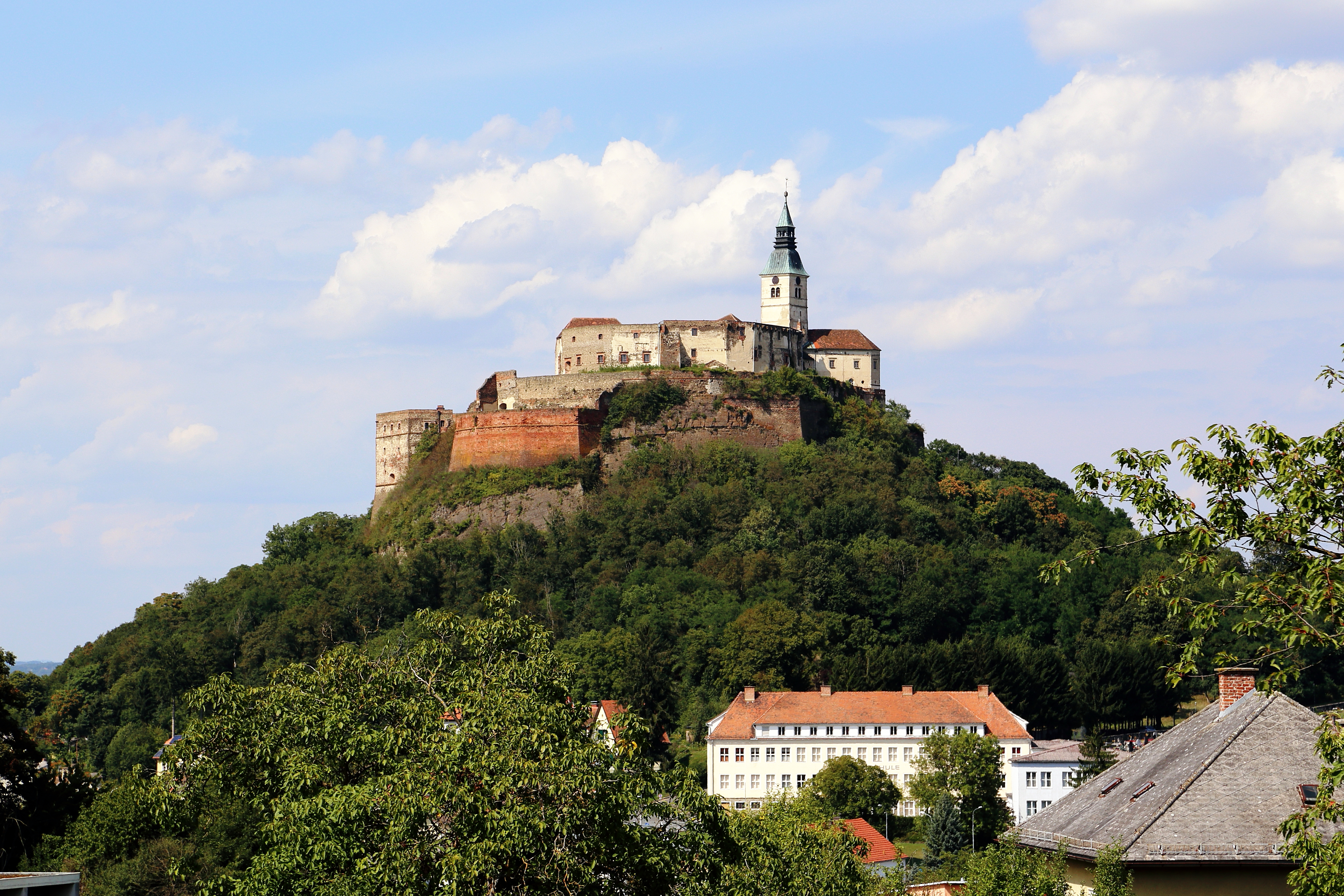
Burg Güssing, which was built by Béla III of Hungary on the pedestal of the short-lived and confiscated Küszén monastery, established by Wolfer in 1157

Both Wolfer and Héder became strong confidants of Géza II, whose reign was characterized by his confrontation with Frederick I, Holy Roman Emperor, who attempted to extend his influence over the Kingdom of Hungary. Wolfer appeared as a witness in various royal charters of Géza II issued in the period 1156–1158, which confirmed his frequent presence in the royal court. Sometime before 1161, Wolfer also negotiated with Eberhard I, Archbishop of Salzburg, who was considered a strong pillar of Pope Alexander III and domestic opposition figure to the Emperor following the controversial 1159 papal election. Through his envoy, Wolfer, King Géza recommended an alliance and promised protection to Eberhard against Frederick Barbarossa. The narration of the archbishop's letter to the Hungarian king, issued in 1161, confirms that Wolfer was deceased by then.

In 1157, Gervasius, Bishop of Győr contributed and permitted the foundation of the Benedictine Abbey of Küszén (later Németújvár, present-day Burg Güssing in Austria), to comes Wolfer, who donated several surrounding lands and vineyards to the monastery. Gervasius subordinated the monastery to the Pannonhalma Abbey and dedicated the new monastery to Virgin Mary. The establishing charter of the Küszén Abbey was preserved through a shortened transliteration from 1230, as a result formerly some historians doubted its authenticity. According to historian Richárd Horváth, Wolfer did not erect a wooden fort there, contrary to the narrations of the medieval chronicles. The establishing charter also emphasizes the mount of Küszén was an "uninhabited wasteland" before the erection of the abbey. As the founder of the monastery, Wolfer was buried there.

However a few decades later, Béla III of Hungary (r. 1172–1196) confiscated the Abbey of Küszén from the Benedictines and, based on the walls of the abbey, built a royal castle (called Németújvár, or simply Újvár, "New Castle", today Güssing in Austria) on top of the hill in the late 1170s or early 1180s, because of its significant strategic location along the Imperial border. He compensated its patron, comes Hencse (Wolfer's son) with the patronage of the newly constructed abbey of Kapornak in Zala County. Wolfer's great-grandson was the powerful lord Henry Kőszegi, whose family ruled the whole Transdanubia and the northern portion of Slavonia independently of the royal power at the turn of the 13th and 14th centuries.

== Sources ==
=== Primary sources ===
- Simon of Kéza: The Deeds of the Hungarians (Edited and translated by László Veszprémy and Frank Schaer with a study by Jenő Szűcs) (1999). CEU Press. ISBN 963-9116-31-9.
- The Hungarian Illuminated Chronicle: Chronica de Gestis Hungarorum (Edited by Dezső Dercsényi) (1970). Corvina, Taplinger Publishing. ISBN 0-8008-4015-1.

=== Secondary sources ===
- Horváth, Richárd (2015). "A favár rejtélye, avagy mennyire régi Újvár vára?: Németújvár várának "vélelmezett" története a kezdetektől a 13. század végéig [The Mystery of the Wooden Fort, or How Old is Újvár?: The "Presumed" History of the Castle of Németújvár from the Beginning to the End of the 13th Century]". Castrum (in Hungarian). 18 (1–2). Castrum Bene Egyesület: 5–24. ISSN 1787-1093.
- Karácsonyi, János (1901). A magyar nemzetségek a XIV. század közepéig. II. kötet [The Hungarian genera until the middle of the 14th century, Vol. 2] (in Hungarian). Hungarian Academy of Sciences.
- Kiss, Gábor; Zágorhidi Czigány, Balázs (2012). "A Héder nemzetség korai birtokai Vas vármegyében és a küszéni bencés apátság [The Foundation of the Benedictine Abbey in Küszén and the Early Possessions of the Héder Family in Vas County]". In Illés, Pál Attila; Juhász-Laczik, Albin (eds.). Örökség és küldetés. Bencések Magyarországon (Rendtörténeti konferenciák 7/1) (in Hungarian). Magyar Egyháztörténeti Enciklopédia Munkaközösség (METEM). pp. 172–180. ISBN 978-963-9662-60-5.
- Wertner, Mór (1895). "A Güssingiek [The Güssingers]". Századok (in Hungarian). 29 (1 & 2). Magyar Történelmi Társulat: 42–64, 136–154. ISSN 0039-8098.
