= Héder II Héder =

Hungarian nobleman

Héder (II) Héder

Ispán of Győr
- Reign: 1223
- Predecessor: Pous Csák
- Successor: Simon Nagymartoni (?)
- Died: after 1223
- Noble family: gens Héder
- Issue: James I Lawrence III a daughter
- Father: Denis I

Héder (II) from the kindred Héder (Hungarian: Héder nembeli (II.) Héder; died after 1223) was a Hungarian lord in the first decades of the 13th century, who served as ispán of Győr County in 1223.

== Life ==
Héder (Hederic or Hedrich) was born into the Hédervár branch of the powerful gens (clan) Héder, as the son of Denis (I). His grandfather was Héder, namesake co-founder of the clan. He had a brother Denis (II), progenitor of the prestigious Hédervári family.

The name of Héder (II) first appears in contemporary records in 1210, when he is mentioned among the neighbors, when royal officials determined the borders of the estate Novák in Győr County. At that time, he possessed Hédervár. Sometime between 1221 and 1223, Héder was appointed ispán of Győr County, according to a royal charter issued in 1223. This is the last information about Héder. The next known office-holder Simon Nagymartoni is first mentioned in this capacity in 1232.

From his unidentified wife, Héder had two sons, James I and Lawrence III, and a daughter, who married Pousa Bár-Kalán. In 1255, James and Lawrence successfully recovered their sister's dowry from the late Pousa's son, Nana.

== Sources ==
- Karácsonyi, János (1901). A magyar nemzetségek a XIV. század közepéig. II. kötet [The Hungarian genera until the middle of the 14th century, Vol. 2] (in Hungarian). Hungarian Academy of Sciences.
- Varga, Virág (2023). "A Héder nembeli Héderváriak társadalmi helyzete a 13–14. század fordulóján [The Social Status of the Hédervári Family of the Héder genus at the Turn of the 13–14th Centuries]". In Hunyadi, Sándor; et al. (eds.). Micae Mediaevales XII (in Hungarian). Eötvös Loránd University. pp. 133–155. ISSN 2062-2198.
- Zsoldos, Attila (2011). Magyarország világi archontológiája, 1000–1301 [Secular Archontology of Hungary, 1000–1301] (in Hungarian). História, MTA Történettudományi Intézete. ISBN 978-963-9627-38-3.

Héder II Genus Héder Born: ? Died: after 1223
Political offices
Preceded by Pous Csák	Ispán of Győr; 1223	Succeeded by Simon Nagymartoni (?)
