= Héder III Héder =

Hungarian nobleman

Héder (III) Héder

Ispán of Hont
- Reign: 1269
- Predecessor: Peter Balassa
- Successor: Demetrius Hont-Pázmány
- Died: after 1279
- Noble family: gens Héder
- Spouse: daughter of Vekhard
- Issue: John II
- Father: Denis II

Héder (III) from the kindred Héder (Hungarian: Héder nembeli (III.) Héder; died after 1279) was a Hungarian nobleman in the second half of the 13th century, who served as ispán of Hont County in 1269.

== Family ==
Héder (III) or Hedrik was born into the Hédervár branch of the powerful gens (clan) Héder, as the son of Denis (II). Héder had two brothers: Herrand was an influential baron in the 1260–1270s, holding important positions in the royal and queenly courts. Denis III ("the White-headed") was the forefather of the prestigious Hédervári family.

Héder married an unidentified daughter of a certain Vekhard. She was the widow of Maurus (II) Győr. Her husband and their only son, Conrad (II) both died before 1252. In that year, Héder successfully filed a lawsuit for his wife's dowry against the Győr clan. During this occasion, Héder became the owner of Zsélyi (Seli) in Moson County, acquiring the estate from Conrad (I) Győr, brother of the late Maurus.

== Career ==
Héder was appointed ispán of Hont County sometime after 1267, when his predecessor Peter Balassa is last mentioned in this capacity. Héder is referred to as ispán only once in 1269. In that year, Héder bought the lands Bős (today Gabčíkovo, Slovakia) and Árpádsoka, originally belonged to the castles of Szolgagyőr and Pressburg, respectively, for 70 silver marks from miles (knight) Nicholas, son of Peter, who was granted these lands for his loyalty from King Béla IV of Hungary and Queen Maria Laskarina sometime after 1264. Both estates originally belonged to the property of Lothard Gutkeled, who supported Duke Stephen in his armed rebellion against his father Béla IV. The neighboring lords – his relatives Henry Kőszegi, Henry's familiaris James (I) Héder, the original owner Lothard Gutkeled and Bökény Hont-Pázmány – objected against the purchase. Béla IV and his court, consisted of four powerful barons of the realm (Maurice Pok, Lawrence Matucsinai, Lawrence Aba and Csák Hahót), dismissed the lawsuit and confirmed the sale transaction still in that year. Nicholas took responsibility for the subsequent lawsuits in defense of Héder. However, Béla IV died and Stephen V ascended the Hungarian throne in 1270. His wife Queen Elizabeth the Cuman persuaded Héder to recover both estates to Lothard Gutkeled, with royal consent still in that year. These data suggest that Héder was a partisan of Béla IV during his confrontation with his eldest son and heir Stephen in the 1260s. According to the charter of the cathedral chapter of Győr in 1271, Héder caused a damage of 7 marks in the estate Bős, which he paid to Lothard's agents in the chapter. In addition, Héder testified that he could not return the estates to Lothard Gutkeled, because he did not manage to get them from Nicholas, son of Peter.

The next ispán of Hont County, Demetrius Hont-Pázmány is mentioned in this capacity only in 1275, but based on his political affiliation, Héder was presumably dismissed from this position already in 1270. He last appears as a living person in 1279, when he acted as an arbiter in a lawsuit over the ownership of Gesztence (today a borough in Jánossomorja) and Várbalog in Moson County between Conrad Győr and a maternal relative, James Bána. Héder and his wife had a son, John II, who was a supporter of Stephen V. He fought against the Bohemians, who invaded the Western borderlands of Hungary in April 1273. He was present in the sieges of Győr and Sopron. Therefore, he was granted Dabrony in Veszprém County. He died without male descendants sometime around 1284; there were some complaints that he unlawfully held a portion of Novák seizing it from Conrad Győr.

== Sources ==
- Karácsonyi, János (1901). A magyar nemzetségek a XIV. század közepéig. II. kötet [The Hungarian genera until the middle of the 14th century, Vol. 2] (in Hungarian). Hungarian Academy of Sciences.
- Varga, Virág (2023). "A Héder nembeli Héderváriak társadalmi helyzete a 13–14. század fordulóján [The Social Status of the Hédervári Family of the Héder genus at the Turn of the 13–14th Centuries]". In Hunyadi, Sándor; et al. (eds.). Micae Mediaevales XII (in Hungarian). Eötvös Loránd University. pp. 133–155. ISSN 2062-2198.
- Zsoldos, Attila (2011). Magyarország világi archontológiája, 1000–1301 [Secular Archontology of Hungary, 1000–1301] (in Hungarian). História, MTA Történettudományi Intézete. ISBN 978-963-9627-38-3.

Héder III Genus Héder Born: ? Died: after 1279
Political offices
Preceded by Peter Balassa	Ispán of Hont; 1269	Succeeded by Demetrius Hont-Pázmány
