= Héder =

German knight

- Lord of Hédervár
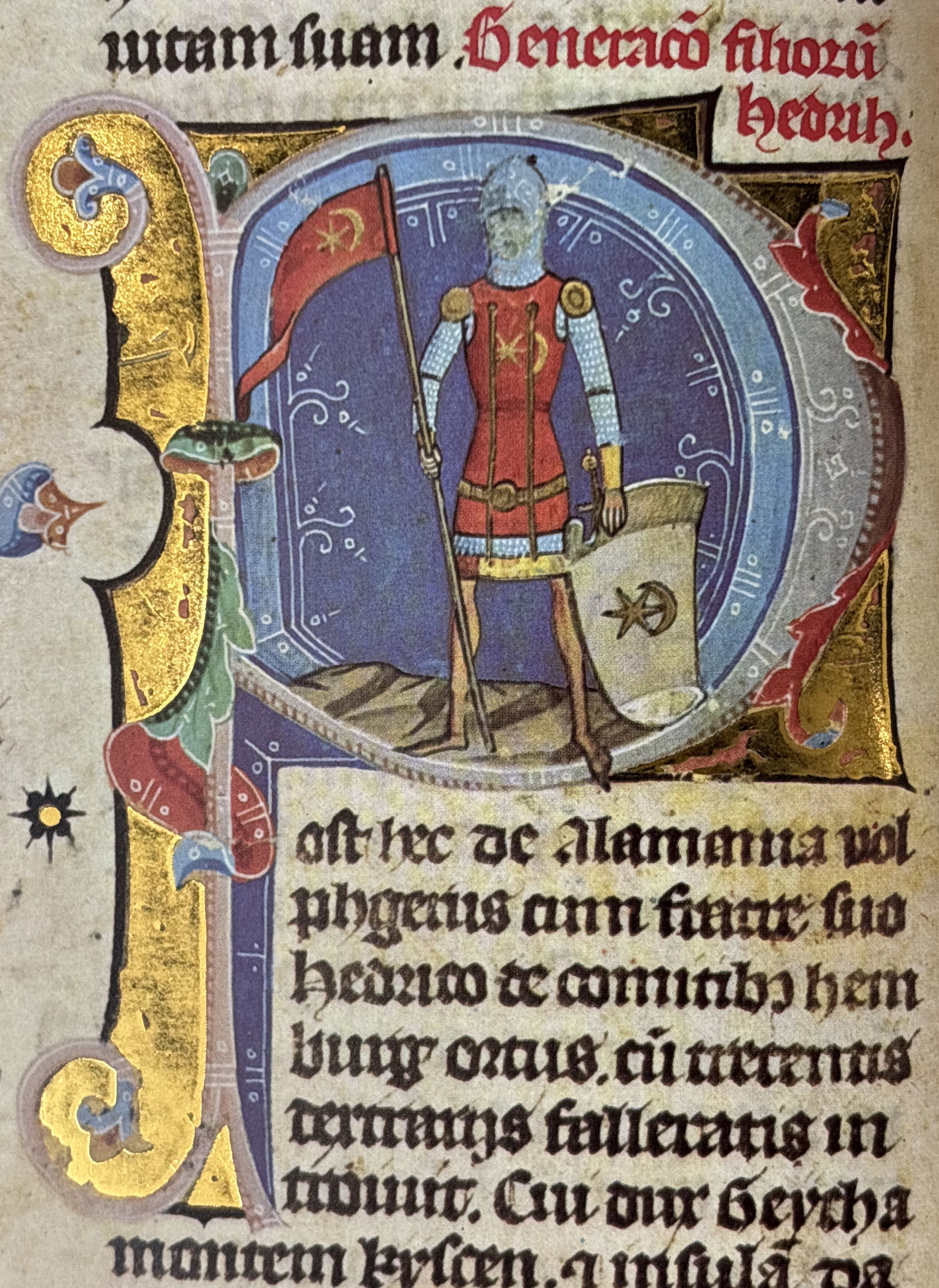
- Héder as depicted in the Illuminated Chronicle with an incorrect coat of arms

Palatine of Hungary
- Reign: 1162–1164
- Predecessor: Beloš
- Successor: Ampud
- Died: after 1164
- Noble family: gens Héder
- Spouse: unknown
- Issue: Denis I

Héder, also Hedrich, Heindrich and Henry (Hungarian: Henrik; died after 1164) was a German knight possibly from the Duchy of Swabia, who, alongside his brother Wolfer, settled down in the Kingdom of Hungary and became a member of the Hungarian nobility. Héder was also eponymous co-founder of the powerful Héder clan and ancestor of the Hédervári family.

== Origin and arrival ==
..., Volphger, who was descended from the counts of Hemburg, came with his brother Hedricus from Alemannia with three hundred armed horsemen, to whom Duke Geysa made a gift of Mount Kyscen and an island in the Danube near Iaurinum that he might dwell there for ever; here he built a castle of wood, and on the same mountain he founded a monastery, where he is buried. From him and his brother springs the clan of Heder.

— Illuminated Chronicle

... Wolfger and his brother Hedrich come to Hungary from Wildon with forty knights in armour. Wolfger was given Mt. Güssing to settle in. There he built a wooden fort, and later a monks' cloister, where he was buried after his death. The Héder descend from him.

— Simon of Kéza: The Deeds of the Hungarians

According to the Illuminated Chronicle, "[After that] Wolfger [Wolfer] came from Germany [to Hungary] alongside his younger brother Henry [Héder] with three-hundred armored war-horses and forty armored knights; They belong to the Counts of Hainburg. Grand Prince Géza donated [to Wolfer] the Mountain of Küszén and an island in Győr's neighborhood, where he built a wood castle and founded an abbey, he was buried there. The Héders' genus originates from them". Mark of Kalt's work incorrectly – accidentally or intentionally – refers to Grand Prince Géza (c. 972–997), father of Saint Stephen, the first King of Hungary, in fact, Wolfer and Héder arrived to Hungary during the first regnal years of the minor Géza II of Hungary (definitely before 1146).

The brothers' place of origin is in dispute. Simon of Kéza's Gesta Hunnorum et Hungarorum writes that Wolfer and Héder came from "Vildonia" with forty armored soldiers, referring to Burgruine Wildon in Styria, however the castle itself was built only after 1157 thus that identification is incorrect. Johannes de Thurocz says in his work Chronica Hungarorum that the two knights originated from Hainburg of "Alemannia", therefore the Duchy of Swabia. Presumably Mark of Kalt's version is closer to the truth, as there was a certain knight Wolfger von Erlach in the first half of the 12th century in Hainburg.

== Career ==
Héder was donated lands and villages in the island plain of Szigetköz in Győr County by King Géza II, while Wolfer became owner of Németújvár (today Güssing in Austria) where he founded a Benedictine monastery and later was buried himself there. Héder established his seat and erected a wooden castle in which later was called Hédervár (lit. "Héder's Castle") after him. Héder was the ancestor of the prestigious Hédervári family (flourished until the end of the 17th century), while the infamous and powerful Kőszegi family originated from Wolfer. As later the Héder genus was named after Héder and not after his elder brother, historian János Karácsonyi argued that Héder "was more talented than Wolfer or lived a very long time". Héder was already mentioned as ispán in 1146. The Héder clan became one of the most influential kindreds by the 13th century. Héder's only known son was Denis I, who owned portions in Almás, together with his cousins from Wolfer's branch. Héder's namesake grandson (fl. 1210–1223) served as ispán of Győr County in 1223. His another grandchild was Denis II, whose branch is the direct ascendant of the Hédervári family.

Between 1150 and 1158, Héder held the dignity of Judge royal, the second-highest secular position after the Palatine. In this capacity, he persuaded Raphael, the abbot of Pannonhalma to borrow 40 silver denari to the king, who planned to visit Henry II, Duke of Austria with his court and a large number of escorts. Raphael had to sell a church estate in order to obtain sum. When Géza invaded the Byzantine Empire and laid siege to Braničevo in late 1154, plausibly Héder and his brother also participated in the campaign alongside other German knights, as Greek historian John Kinnamos referred to them "Saxon" mercenaries. In fear of being seized and executed by King Géza II, his brother, the rebellious Duke Stephen sought refuge in the Holy Roman Empire in the summer of 1157. Frederick I, Holy Roman Emperor, was willing to arbitrate the conflict between Géza II and Stephen, and dispatched his envoys to Hungary. In response, Géza sent delegates to the Emperor, Judge royal Héder and Gervasius, Bishop of Győr. At the Diet of Regensburg in January 1158, Héder and Gervasius rejected the accusations of Stephen and successfully reached the Emperor withdrew his support from the pretender. After that Stephen left for Constantinople.

Following the death of Géza II, Héder supported the 15-year-old Stephen III, who was crowned on 31 May 1162. Héder was appointed Palatine soon and because of the King's young age, also functioned as de facto regent. Stephen III's two uncles, Ladislaus and Stephen, who had joined the court of the Byzantine Empire, challenged his right to the crown, and the Byzantine Emperor Manuel I Komnenos launched an expedition against Hungary. Fearing an invasion by Manuel, the Hungarian magnates, also Héder, agreed to accept Ladislaus, as a "compromise candidate" in July 1162. After Ladislaus' death Stephen III was restored and overturned the other pretender Stephen IV's army. Héder held the office of Palatine until 1164, when he was replaced by the skilled military leader Ampud.

== Sources ==
=== Primary sources ===
- Simon of Kéza: The Deeds of the Hungarians (Edited and translated by László Veszprémy and Frank Schaer with a study by Jenő Szűcs) (1999). CEU Press. ISBN 963-9116-31-9.
- The Hungarian Illuminated Chronicle: Chronica de Gestis Hungarorum (Edited by Dezső Dercsényi) (1970). Corvina, Taplinger Publishing. ISBN 0-8008-4015-1.

=== Secondary sources ===
- Karácsonyi, János (1901). A magyar nemzetségek a XIV. század közepéig. II. kötet [The Hungarian genera until the middle of the 14th century, Vol. 2] (in Hungarian). Hungarian Academy of Sciences.
- Kiss, Gábor; Zágorhidi Czigány, Balázs (2012). "A Héder nemzetség korai birtokai Vas vármegyében és a küszéni bencés apátság [The Foundation of the Benedictine Abbey in Küszén and the Early Possessions of the Héder Family in Vas County]". In Illés, Pál Attila; Juhász-Laczik, Albin (eds.). Örökség és küldetés. Bencések Magyarországon (Rendtörténeti konferenciák 7/1) (in Hungarian). Magyar Egyháztörténeti Enciklopédia Munkaközösség (METEM). pp. 172–180. ISBN 978-963-9662-60-5.
- Makk, Ferenc (1989). The Árpáds and the Comneni: Political Relations between Hungary and Byzantium in the 12th century (Translated by György Novák). Akadémiai Kiadó. ISBN 963-05-5268-X.
- Markó, László (2006). A magyar állam főméltóságai Szent Istvántól napjainkig: Életrajzi Lexikon [Great Officers of State in Hungary from King Saint Stephen to Our Days: A Biographical Encyclopedia] (in Hungarian). Helikon Kiadó. ISBN 963-208-970-7.
- Zsoldos, Attila (2011). Magyarország világi archontológiája, 1000–1301 [Secular Archontology of Hungary, 1000–1301] (in Hungarian). História, MTA Történettudományi Intézete. ISBN 978-963-9627-38-3.

Héder I Genus Héder Born: ? Died: after 1164
Political offices
Preceded by Gereon	Judge royal 1150–1158	Succeeded by Appa (?)
Preceded by Beloš	Palatine of Hungary; 1162–1164	Succeeded by Ampud
