= Küszén Abbey =

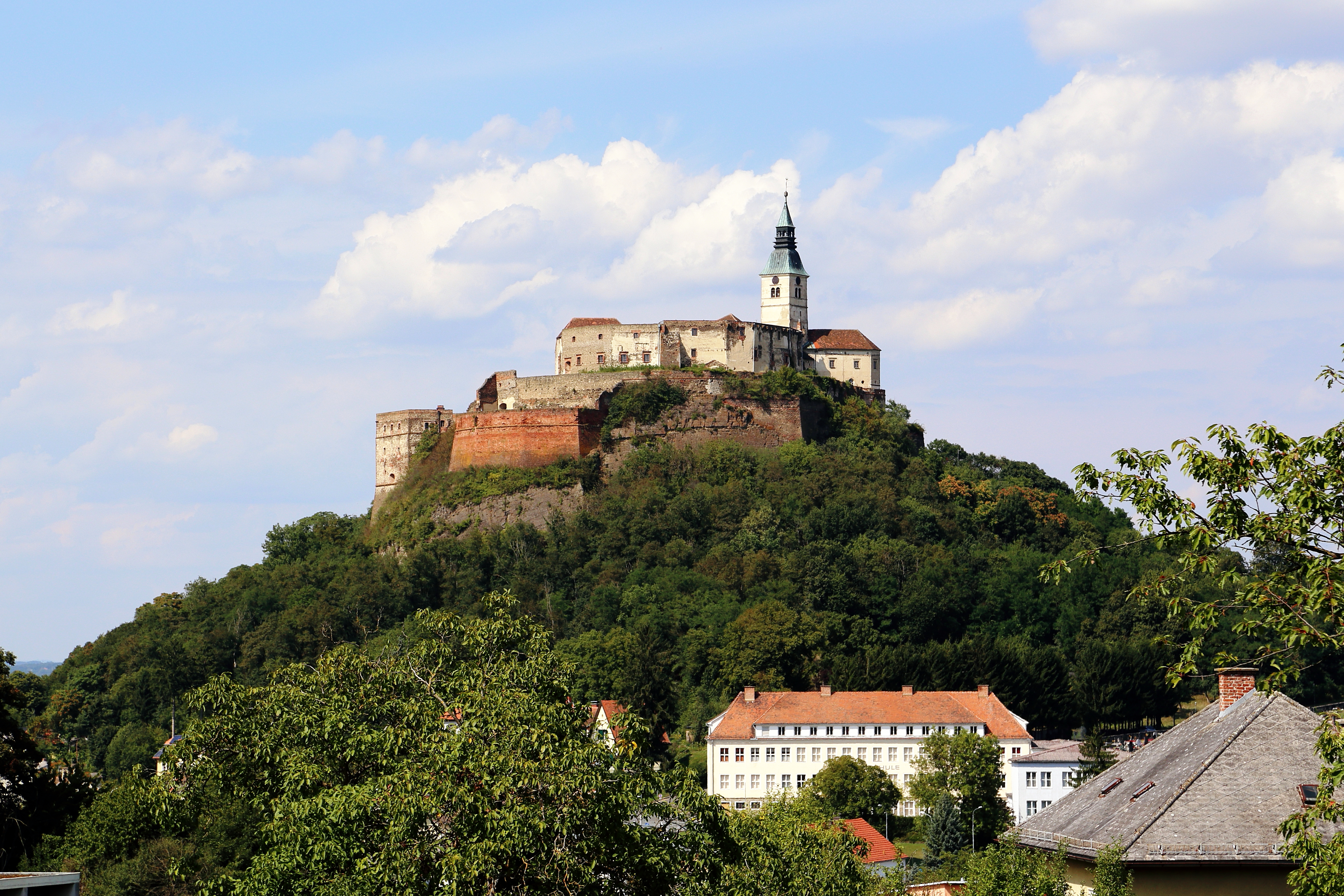
- Burg Güssing, which was built by Béla III of Hungary on the pedestal of the short-lived and confiscated Küszén monastery

Monastery information
- Order: Benedictine
- Established: 1157
- Disestablished: c. 1180
- Mother house: Pannonhalma Archabbey
- Dedication: Virgin Mary
- Diocese: Győr

People
- Founder: Wolfer

Site
- Location: Güssing, Burgenland, Austria

The Küszén Abbey was a short-lived Benedictine Christian monastery on the top of the mountain Küszén in the medieval Kingdom of Hungary (today Burgenland, Austria). The monastery was established by German-born knight Wolfer, forefather of the powerful Kőszegi family. It was subordinated to the Pannonhalma Archabbey. After a few decades of operation, Béla III of Hungary confiscated the monastery from the Benedictine friars and erected a castle in place of the abbey around 1180.

== Establishment ==
Brothers Wolfer and Héder arrived to the Kingdom of Hungary during the reign of Géza II of Hungary. Wolfer was granted lands beyond the Austrian border, most of his estates laid in the valley of stream Strém (or Strem) and centered around the hill of Küszén. In 1157, Gervasius, Bishop of Győr contributed and permitted the foundation of a Benedictine abbey at the top of the mountain of Küszén, to comes Wolfer, who donated several surrounding lands and vineyards to the monastery. Gervasius subordinated the monastery to the Pannonhalma Abbey and dedicated the new monastery to Virgin Mary. Wolfer settled people to the surrounding uninhabited lands, who were allowed to pay the tithe directly to the monastery. Géza II confirmed the foundation of the abbey. The establishing charter of the Küszén Abbey was preserved through a shortened transliteration from 1230, as a result formerly some historians doubted its authenticity. Later medieval chronicles, for instance the Gesta Hunnorum et Hungarorum and the Illuminated Chronicle also preserved the foundation of the abbey. In an anachronistic way, the chronicles also suggest that Wolfer erected a "wooden fort" there, but decades later, the castle of Németújvár (Güssing) was built based on the abbey's stone walls. It is also possible the chronicles refer to the construction of the fort of Hédervár, and the authors merged the two locations accidentally or intentionally in their works. A few years later, Wolfer died. He was buried in the monks' cloister after his death.

== Dissolution ==
According to a letter of Pope Honorius III in March 1225, the Pannonhalma Archabbey was able to appoint three abbots to the monastery of Küszén in the previous decades, before "King Béla took it with the promise that, in return, he would give another place suitable for building church and estates as accessories". Béla III (r. 1172–1196) confiscated the Abbey of Küszén from the Benedictine friars and used the abbey's stone buildings to erect a royal castle (called Németújvár, or simply Újvár, "New Castle", today Güssing in Austria) on top of the hill around 1180. By that time, the tense relationship between Hungary and the Holy Roman Empire emerged, as Béla supported the papacy against Frederick I, Holy Roman Emperor during the Investiture Controversy. The Hungarian king also had conflicts over border disputes with the Duchy of Austria in the second half of the 1170s. Under such circumstances, the mountain of Küszén and its fortified abbey proved to be a strategic military site along the border with Austria.

Béla compensated the abbey's patron, comes Hencse (Wolfer's son) with the patronage of the newly constructed abbey of Kapornak in Zala County. Furthermore, Wolfer's descendants remained the owners of the nearby Szentelek and Szentkút (present-day Stegersbach and Heiligenbrunn in Austria, respectively). A privilege charter by Emeric of Hungary from 1198 refers to the vineyards of Szentkút as the accessory of the newly built castle (Újvár, or Novi Castri), this is the first mention of Németújvár (or Güssing) Castle by contemporary records. The Benedictine Order was partially compensated only in 1263 by Béla IV of Hungary, despite the continued papal protests and interventions in the case. In that year, Béla IV and his wife, Queen Maria Laskarina donated the lordship of Vágújhely in Nyitra County (present-day Nové Mesto nad Váhom in Slovakia) and an island at Lake Balaton to the Pannonhalma Archabbey, in exchange for "the castle of Küszén, called Újvár". In 1271, Béla's son, Stephen V of Hungary withdrew the donation and handed over the lordship to the influential baron Lawrence, son of Kemény. In 1273, Ladislaus IV of Hungary recovered the estate to the Benedictine friars, sorting the dispute.

== Sources ==
- F. Romhányi, Beatrix (2000). Kolostorok és társaskáptalanok a középkori Magyarországon: Katalógus [Monasteries and Collegiate Chapters in Medieval Hungary: A Catalogue] (in Hungarian). Pytheas. ISBN 963-7483-07-1.
- Horváth, Richárd (2015). "A favár rejtélye, avagy mennyire régi Újvár vára?: Németújvár várának "vélelmezett" története a kezdetektől a 13. század végéig [The Mystery of the Wooden Fort, or How Old is Újvár?: The "Presumed" History of the Castle of Németújvár from the Beginning to the End of the 13th Century]". Castrum. 18 (1–2). Castrum Bene Egyesület: 5–24.
- Kiss, Gábor; Zágorhidi Czigány, Balázs (2012). "A Héder nemzetség korai birtokai Vas vármegyében és a küszéni bencés apátság [The Foundation of the Benedictine Abbey in Küszén and the Early Possessions of the Héder Family in Vas County]". In Illés, Pál Attila; Juhász-Laczik, Albin (eds.). Örökség és küldetés. Bencések Magyarországon (Rendtörténeti konferenciák 7/1) (in Hungarian). Magyar Egyháztörténeti Enciklopédia Munkaközösség (METEM). pp. 172–180. ISBN 978-963-9662-60-5.
