= Gervasius (bishop of Győr) =

Hungarian bishop

- Bishop of Győr
- Appointed: 1156
- Term ended: 1157 or 1158
- Predecessor: Izbeg
- Successor: Andrew

Personal details
- Died: after 1157 or 1158

Gervasius (Hungarian: Gyárfás; died after 1157 or 1158) was a Hungarian prelate who served as Bishop of Győr from 1156 to 1157 or 1158.

== Career ==
Gervasius or Geruasius started his ecclesiastical career as a member of the royal chapel during the reign of Géza II of Hungary. He was styled as royal chaplain in 1146 and 1150. He was described as "high-skilled, remarkably cultivated man" by chronicler Rahewin. He was elected Bishop of Győr in 1156.

Becoming a member of the royal council, he interceded with Géza II in March 1157 to grant the collection right of salt duties to the Archdiocese of Esztergom at Nána and Kakat (present-day Štúrovo, Slovakia). Through his intercession, Géza II also granted some privileges to the cathedral chapter of Győr. Still in the same year, Gervasius contributed and permitted the foundation of the Benedictine Abbey of Küszén (later Németújvár, present-day Burg Güssing in Austria) to comes Wolfer, a Carinthian-born knight and ancestor of the Kőszegi family. Gervasius subordinated the monastery to the Pannonhalma Abbey.

According to the contemporaneous Rahewin, Géza's younger brother Stephen was "accused before the king of aspiring to royal power". In fear of being seized and executed by his brother, Stephen sought refuge in the Holy Roman Empire in summer 1157. Upon the emperor's demand, who favored Stephen, Géza accepted Frederick Barbarossa as arbitrator in his conflict with Stephen and sent his envoys – Judge royal Héder (Wolfer's brother) and Bishop Gervasius – to the Imperial Diet at Regensburg in January 1158. There the envoys refused Stephen's accusations and have successfully achieved that Frederick took a neutral position, who "decided to defer to a more suitable time the settlement" of the quarrel between Géza and Stephen. After Héder and Gervasius' successful diplomatic mission, Stephen, left the German court for the Byzantine Empire and settled in Constantinople. Rahewin, who narrated the events in the continuation of Otto of Freising's Gesta Friderici imperatoris, incorrectly referred to Gervasius as "Bishop of Vasvár", which was, in fact, the collegiate chapter of his diocese. The remaining part of Gervasius' episcopate is unknown. His nearest known successor was Andrew, who was elected Bishop of Győr in 1169, a decade later.

== Sources ==
- Bánk, József, ed. (1968). Győregyházmegyei almanach. Schematizmus Dioecesis Jaurinensis [Almanac of the Diocese of Győr] (in Hungarian). Authority of the Diocese of Győr.
- Kubinyi, András (1975). "Királyi kancellária és udvari kápolna Magyarországon a XII. század közepén [Royal Chancery and Court Chapel in Hungary in the Middle of the 12th Century]". Levéltári Közlemények (in Hungarian). 46 (1). National Archives of Hungary: 59–121. ISSN 0024-1512.
- Makk, Ferenc (1989). The Árpáds and the Comneni: Political Relations between Hungary and Byzantium in the 12th century (Translated by György Novák). Akadémiai Kiadó. ISBN 963-05-5268-X.
- Zsoldos, Attila (2011). Magyarország világi archontológiája, 1000–1301 [Secular Archontology of Hungary, 1000–1301] (in Hungarian). História, MTA Történettudományi Intézete. ISBN 978-963-9627-38-3.

Catholic Church titles
Preceded by Izbeg	Bishop of Győr; 1156–1158	Succeeded by Andrew
