= Rábagyarmat =

- Coat of arms

- Location of Rábagyarmat in Hungary
- Coordinates: 46.94327°N 16.42216°E
- Country: Hungary
- Region: Western Transdanubia
- County: Vas
- Subregion: Szentgotthárdi
- Rank: Village

Area
  - Total: 16.79 km^{2} (6.48 sq mi)

Population (1 January 2008)
  - Total: 836
  - Density: 49.8/km^{2} (129/sq mi)
- Time zone: UTC+1 (CET)
  - Summer (DST): UTC+2 (CEST)
- Postal code: 9961
- Area code: +36 94
- KSH code: 26736

Rábagyarmat (Slovene: Žormot, German: Rupprecht) is a village in Vas, Hungary.
