= Mesteri =

- Coat of arms

- Location of Vas county in Hungary

- Location of Mesteri
- Coordinates: 47.22556°N 17.08846°E
- Country: Hungary
- County: Vas

Area
  - Total: 11.71 km^{2} (4.52 sq mi)

Population (2004)
  - Total: 279
  - Density: 23.82/km^{2} (61.7/sq mi)
- Time zone: UTC+1 (CET)
  - Summer (DST): UTC+2 (CEST)
- Postal code: 9551
- Area code: 95

Mesteri is a village in Vas county, Hungary.
