= Pácsony =

- Location of Pácsony in Hungary
- Coordinates: 47.01581°N 16.85530°E
- Country: Hungary
- Region: Western Transdanubia
- County: Vas
- Subregion: Vasvári
- Rank: Village

Area
  - Total: 10.01 km^{2} (3.86 sq mi)

Population (1 October 2011)
  - Total: 272
  - Density: 27.2/km^{2} (70.4/sq mi)
- Time zone: UTC+1 (CET)
  - Summer (DST): UTC+2 (CEST)
- Postal code: 9823
- Area code: +36 94
- KSH code: 07162
- Website: http://www.pacsony.hu/

Pácsony is a village in Vas county, Hungary.
