= Almásháza =

Village in Zala County, Hungary

- Village
- Location of Almásháza
- Coordinates: 46.84276°N 17.04814°E
- Country: Hungary
- Region: Western Transdanubia
- County: Zala County
- First documented: 1198

Area
  - Total: 1.92 sq mi (4.98 km^{2})

Population (2015)
  - Total: 70
  - Density: 36/sq mi (14/km^{2})
- Time zone: UTC+1 (CET)
  - Summer (DST): UTC+2 (CEST)

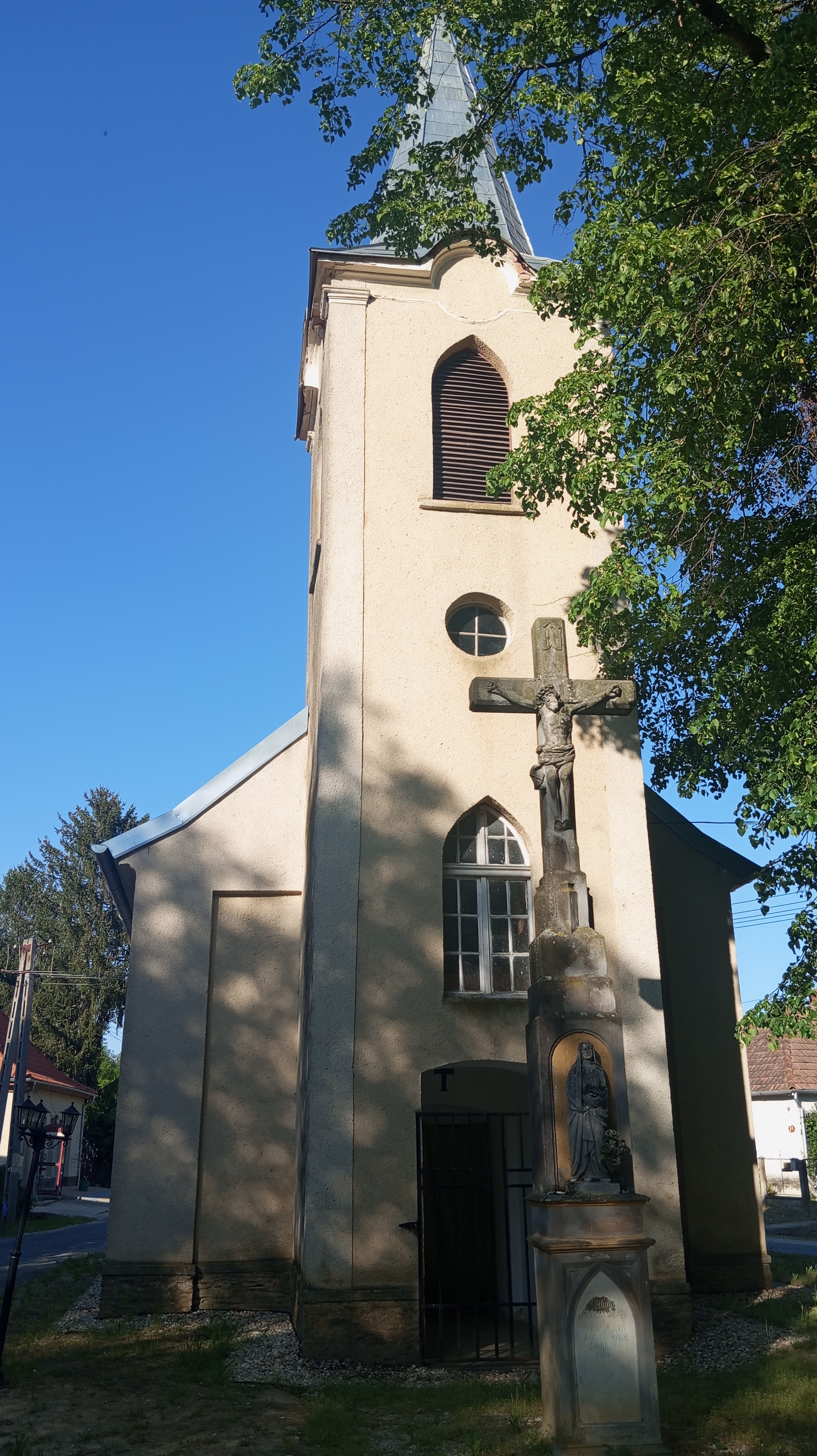

Almásháza is a village in Zala County, Hungary. Its first appearance in documentation was in the year 1198.
