= Güssing Castle =

Castle in Austria

Coordinates: 47°03′24″N 16°19′22″E

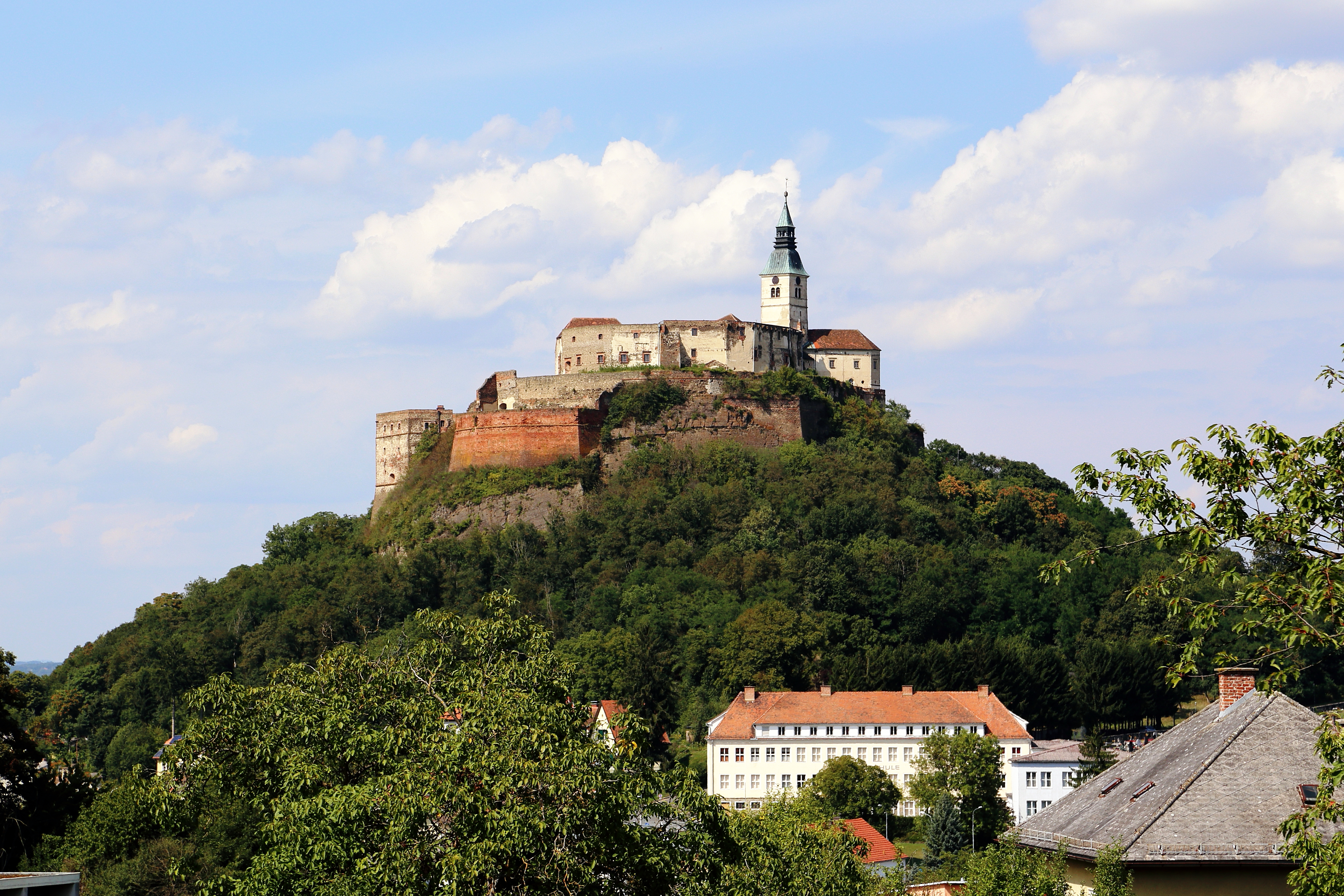
Güssing Castle

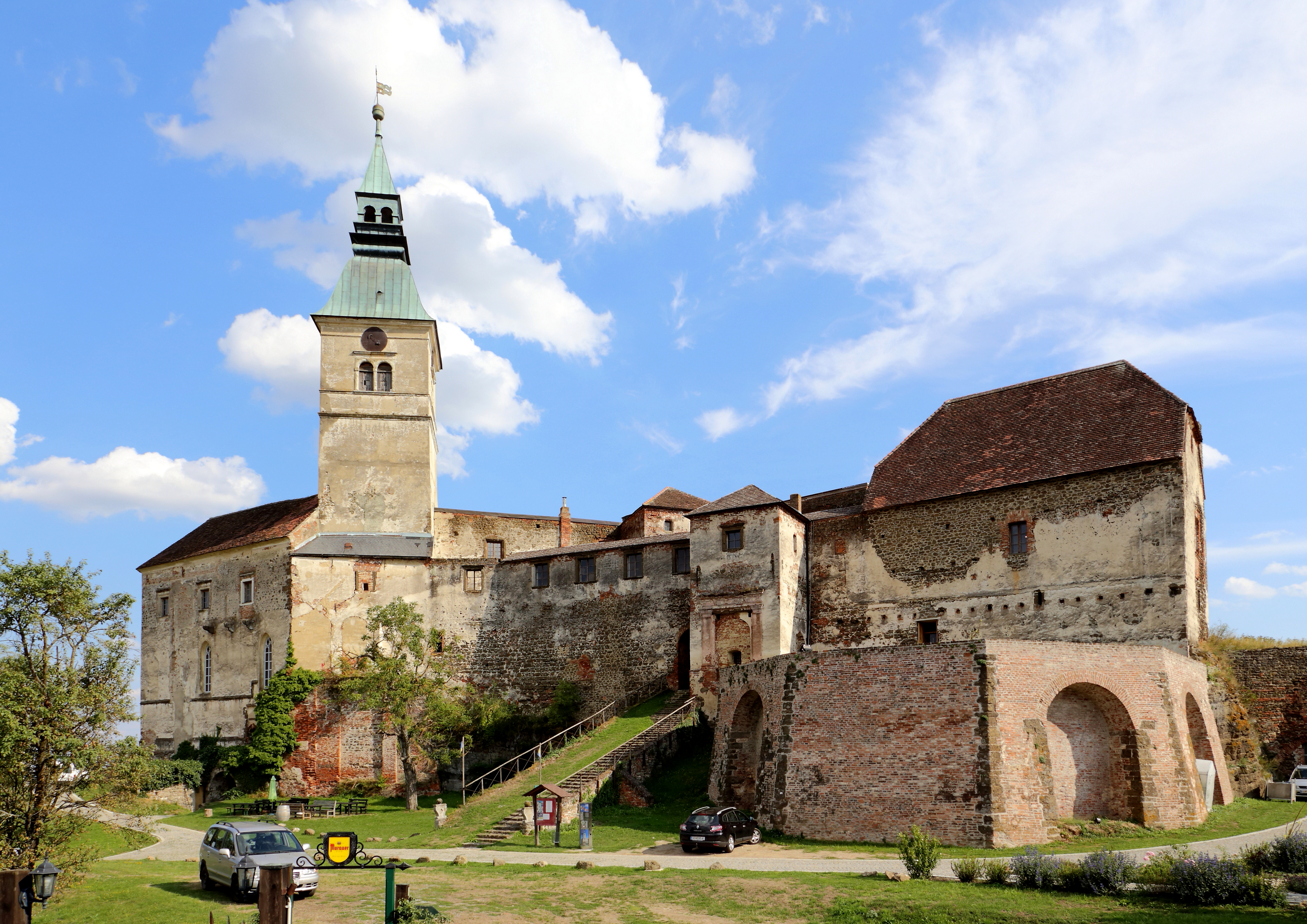
Northwest side of castle

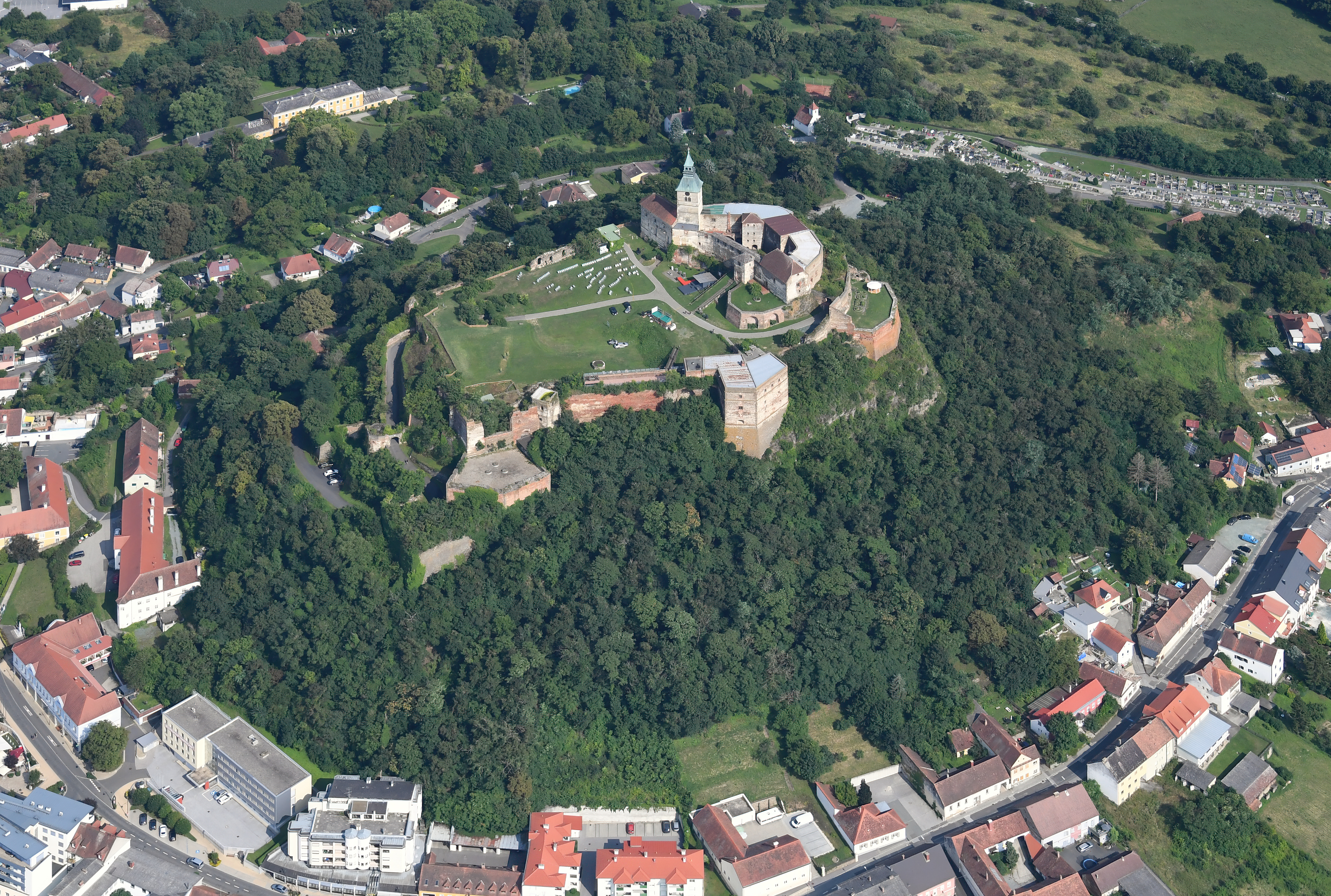
Aerial view from the west

Güssing Castle (German: Burg Güssing, Hungarian: németújvári vár) is a castle in southern Burgenland, Austria. On June 30, 1524, the castle was acquired by the Batthyány family, which retains ownership through a historical foundation that provides for the care and maintenance of the castle. Güssing Castle is 293 metres (961 ft) above sea level. Established by Béla III of Hungary around 1180, Güssing Castle is the oldest castle in Burgenland.

== History ==
=== Middle Ages ===
Wolfer, a German knight, who arrived to the Kingdom of Hungary during the reign of Géza II, founded a Benedictine monastery on the top of the mountain Güssing (or Küszén) in 1157. Contrary to the narrations of the medieval chronicles, he did not erect a wooden castle there; the establishing charter also emphasizes the mount of Küszén was an "uninhabited wasteland" before the erection of the abbey. After a few decades of its operation, Béla III confiscated the abbey from the Benedictine friars and used the abbey's stone buildings to erect a royal castle (Novum Castrum or Újvár, "New Castle", later Németújvár, "German's New Castle", today Güssing Castle) on top of the hill around 1180. By that time, the tense relationship between Hungary and the Holy Roman Empire emerged, as Béla supported the papacy against Frederick I, Holy Roman Emperor during the Investiture Controversy. The Hungarian king also had conflicts over border disputes with the Duchy of Austria in the second half of the 1170s. Under such circumstances, the mountain of Küszén and its fortified abbey proved to be a strategic military site along the border with Austria. The castle is first mentioned by contemporary records in 1198. According to historian Richárd Horváth, the castle was called Újvár, because the proximity of the castle of Pinkaóvár (or simply Óvár, "Old Castle", present-day part of Hannersdorf in Austria), which was the oldest motte-and-bailey castle in the region.

Sometimes before 1225, Andrew II donated the castle to his faithful partisan Demetrius Csák. The Benedictine friars continuously petitioned against Andrew's decision to the Holy See, who urged Demetrius several times to recover Németújvár to the Benedictine friars, but he refused to do that. As a result, Pope Gregory IX excommunicated Demetrius in 1228 or 1229. When the pope sent another complaint to the new king, Béla IV in 1238, Demetrius still possessed the castle. It is plausible that Demetrius owned Németújvár until his death; the next mention of the castle is from 1263, long after his death. The Benedictine friars were compensated only in that year by Béla IV, who donated some landholdings in Nyitra County to the Pannonhalma Abbey, "in exchange" for the castle. By that time, his loyal baron, Maurice Pok and his brothers already possessed Németújvár, when Béla IV donated some surrounding lands to them. According to the royal charter, they were granted the castle "to successfully defend" and thereafter they built a tower and other buildings in the "superior castle" at their own expense. Richárd Horváth argues these events occurred in the first half of the 1250s, when Béla IV was involved in a military confrontation with Ottokar II of Bohemia over the Duchy of Styria.

Despite statements of some historiographical works, Wolfer's descendants, the Kőszegi family did not regain the castle in the 1270s (earlier Hungarian academic works in the late 19th century still erroneously called the Kőszegis as "Németújváris" or "Güssingers"). It was not mention as property of the Kőszegis neither 1271 nor 1279. King Ladislaus IV referred to Németújvár as a royal castle in 1274, when its castellan, Michael, son of Budmerius was granted the estate of Nevegy in Somogy County, because he successfully defended the castle against the invading Bohemian troops and recovered the fort to the Hungarian king in the previous year. The siege of Németújvár presumably occurred in the late spring of 1273. The castle fell to Wolfer's great-great grandson, the notorious oligarch Ivan Kőszegi in the first half of the 1280s, during his rapid expansion over Western Transdanubia. When Albert I, Duke of Austria launched his massive royal campaign (still incorrectly called "Güssing Feud" in Austrian historiography) with his 15,000-size army against the Kőszegis in the spring of 1289, Németújvár was also besieged and captured among other important forts. The new Hungarian king, Andrew III recovered the castle after his campaign against Austria in 1291. The Peace of Hainburg, which concluded the war, was signed on 26 August 1291. Based on a lost document, written by Mór Wertner, Berthold von Emmerberg, who seized the castle from Ivan Kőszegi two years earlier, strongly opposed to hand Németújvár back to the Hungarians. The peace treaty prescribed the destruction of the fortresses that Albert had seized from the Kőszegis, which was in the interests of both monarchs. Thereafter, Ivan Kőszegi and his brothers rebelled against the king. After a brief war, Andrew was captured and imprisoned by Ivan in August 1292. He was liberated within four months, it is possible that the recovery of Németújvár to the Kőszegis was one of the conditions to get rid of his captivity. Ivan Kőszegi and his descendants possessed the castle thereafter. Charles I, who defeated the oligarchs one after another, launched a military campaign against Ivan's younger son, John the "Wolf" in 1327. His royal general Alexander Köcski captured four castles, including Németújvár, resulting in the ultimate disintegration of the Kőszegis' power over Transdanubia.

=== Batthyány lordship ===
On June 30, 1524, Francis I Batthyány (1497–1566) received Castle Güssing and the associated lands.

Times changed and due to the modernization of warfare, the castle and fortress of Güssing slowly lost its strategic importance. In 1777 all guns were removed. Due to the high cost of maintenance and the introduced “roof tax” by empress Maria Theresia, there was a partial demolition of some of the castles fortifications.

In 1870 Prince Philipp Batthyány-Strattmann established a foundation for the preservation of the castle and monastery as an historic structure. However, in the years following World War I, foundation had lost most of its money due to inflation and the costs of war.

Today, the castle acts as a tourist attraction in addition to being an important historical structure. Theater performances, concerts and readings can be attended on the castle grounds during the summer months, and there is a family museum located within.

== Sources ==
- Horváth, Richárd (2015). "A favár rejtélye, avagy mennyire régi Újvár vára?: Németújvár várának "vélelmezett" története a kezdetektől a 13. század végéig [The Mystery of the Wooden Fort, or How Old is Újvár?: The "Presumed" History of the Castle of Németújvár from the Beginning to the End of the 13th Century]". Castrum. 18 (1–2). Castrum Bene Egyesület: 5–24.
