= Nagykapornak =

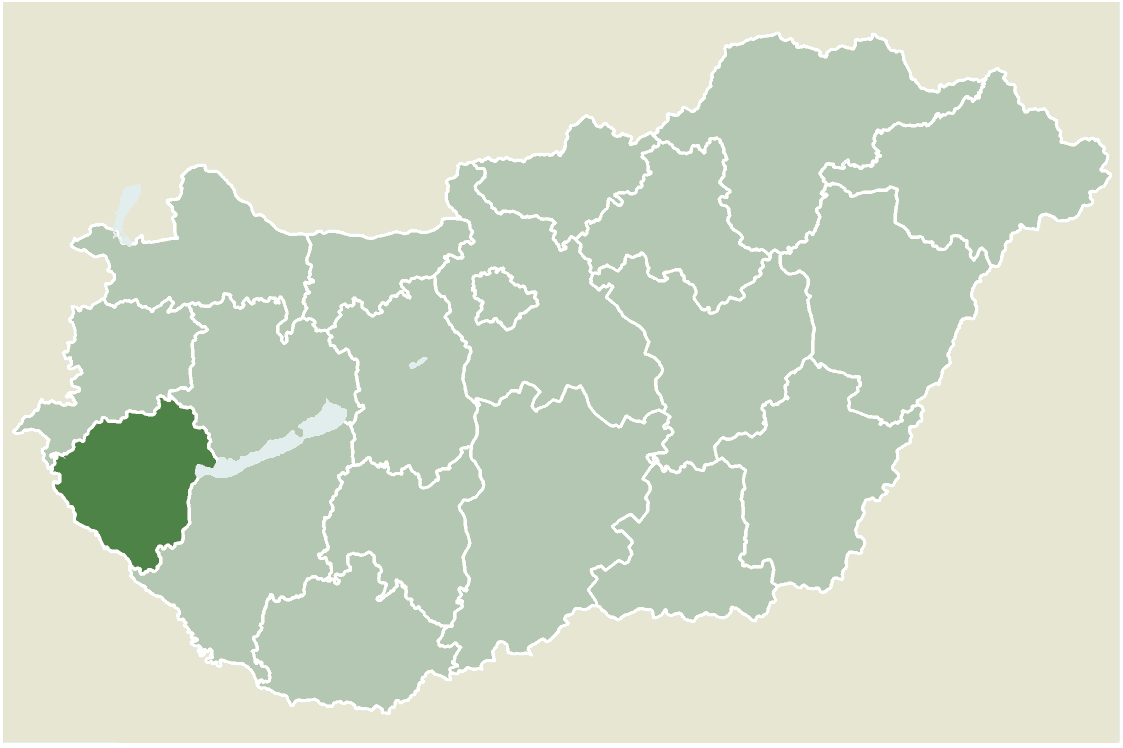
- Location of Zala county in Hungary

- Location of Nagykapornak
- Coordinates: 46.81982°N 16.99495°E
- Country: Hungary
- County: Zala

Area
  - Total: 24.41 km^{2} (9.42 sq mi)

Population (2004)
  - Total: 939
  - Density: 38.46/km^{2} (99.6/sq mi)
- Time zone: UTC+1 (CET)
  - Summer (DST): UTC+2 (CEST)
- Postal code: 8935
- Area code: 92

Nagykapornak is a village in Zala County, Hungary.

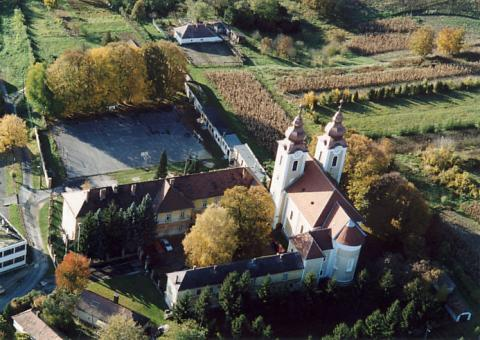
Aerial photography of Nagykapornak
