= Burgruine Wildon =

Castle ruin in Styria, Austria

Coordinates: 46.884°N 15.510°E

- Burg Neu-Wildon
- Styria, Austria

Site information
- Type: Castle
- Open to the public: yes
- Condition: Ruined

Site history
- Built: Early 13th century

Garrison information
- Occupants: Lords of Wildon

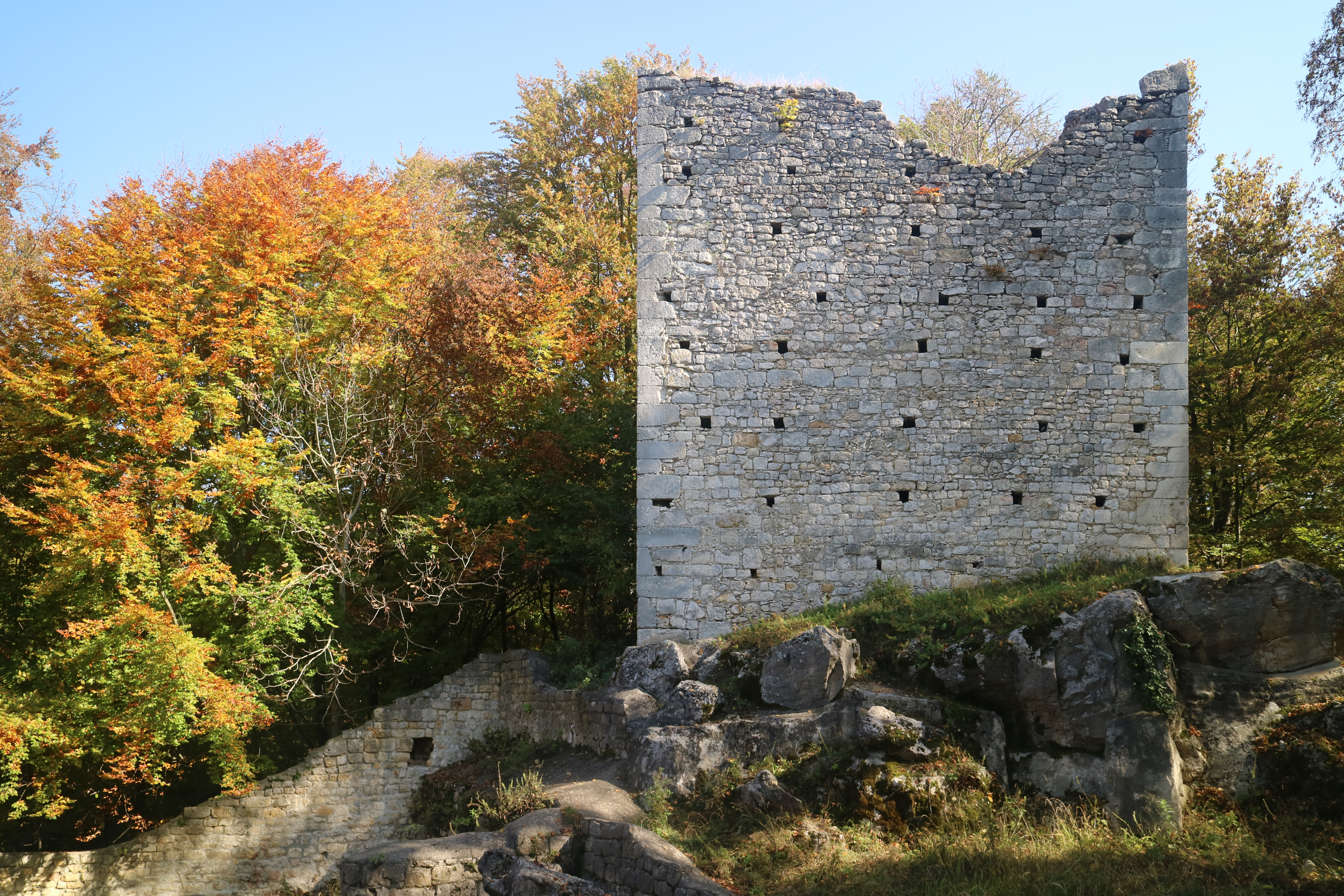
A part of the castle ruins.

Burgruine Wildon also known as Ober-Wildon is a castle in Styria, Austria. Its history dates back to the 13th century, when the Lords of Wildon built the castle.

== See also ==
- List of castles in Austria
- VR-Tour through the castle ruins on burgen.erhartc.net
