= Gesta Hunnorum et Hungarorum =

13th-century historical medieval chronicle from the Kingdom of Hungary

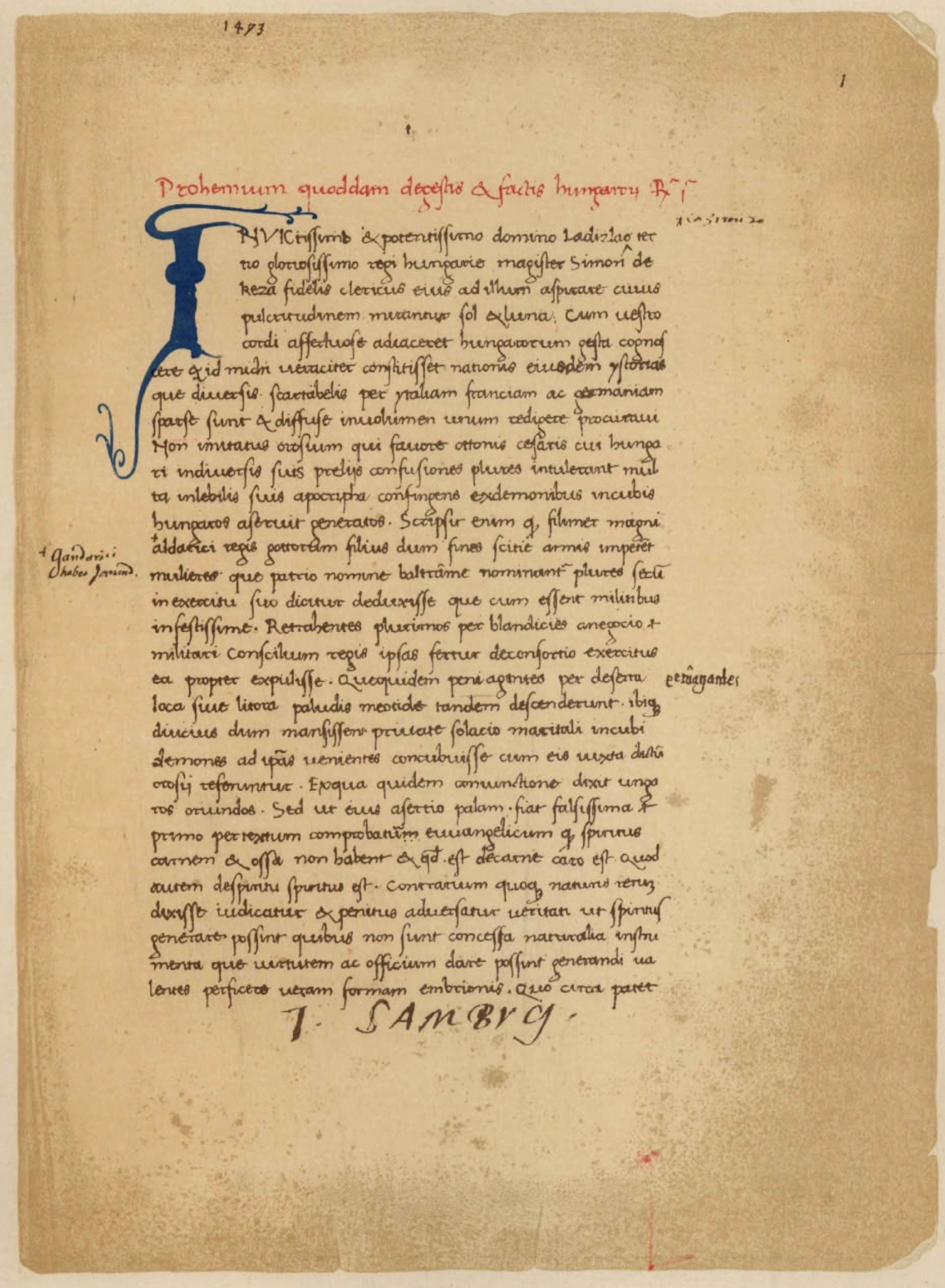
- First page of the Gesta Hunnorum et Hungarorum
- Author: Simon of Kéza
- Language: Latin
- Subjects: History of the Hungarians
- Genre: Chronicle
- Published: Around 1282–1285
- Publication place: Kingdom of Hungary
- Media type: Manuscript

The Gesta Hunnorum et Hungarorum (Latin: "Deeds of the Huns and Hungarians") is a medieval chronicle written mainly by Simon of Kéza around 1282–1285. It is one of the sources of early Hungarian history. It is also known as the Gesta Hungarorum (II) (Latin: "Deeds of the Hungarians"), the "(II)" indicating its status as an expansion of the original Gesta Hungarorum (written around 1200).

The work is dated to 1282–1285 as it includes the Battle of Lake Hód (1282) but does not mention the Second Mongol invasion of Hungary in 1285.

The work combines Hunnish legend with history. It consists of two parts: the Hunnish legend ("Hunnish Chronicle"), expanded with Hungarian oral tales; and a history of the Kingdom of Hungary since the original Gesta Hungarorum.

Simon of Kéza was a court cleric of King Ladislaus IV of Hungary (reigned 1272–1290). He travelled widely in Italy, France and Germany and culled his epic and poetic materials from a broad range of readings.

By Kéza's own admission, he used contemporary German, Italian and French chronicles, but it has been proved that he freely used Hungarian sources also.

The Gesta Hunnorum et Hungarorum was edited and translated in 1999 by László Veszprémy and Frank Schaer for the Central European University.

== See also ==
- List of Hungarian chronicles
- Gesta Hungarorum
- Chronicon Pictum
- Buda Chronicle
- Chronica Hungarorum
- Epitome rerum Hungarorum
- Nádasdy Mausoleum
- Hungarian prehistory
- Hunor and Magor
- Seven chieftains of the Magyars
- Turul
- Árpád dynasty
- Principality of Hungary
- Kingdom of Hungary (1000–1301)
