= Styrian Prealps =

Mountain range

- German: Steirisches Randgebirge; Slovene: Štajersko Robno hribovje; Hungarian: Stájer Elő-Alpok
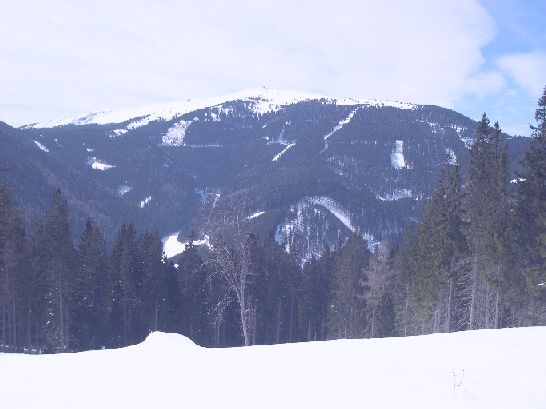
- The Stuhleck (1,782 m) in winter

Highest point
- Peak: Ameringkogel
- Elevation: 2,184 m (7,165 ft)
- Coordinates: 47°04′16″N 14°48′30″E

Geography
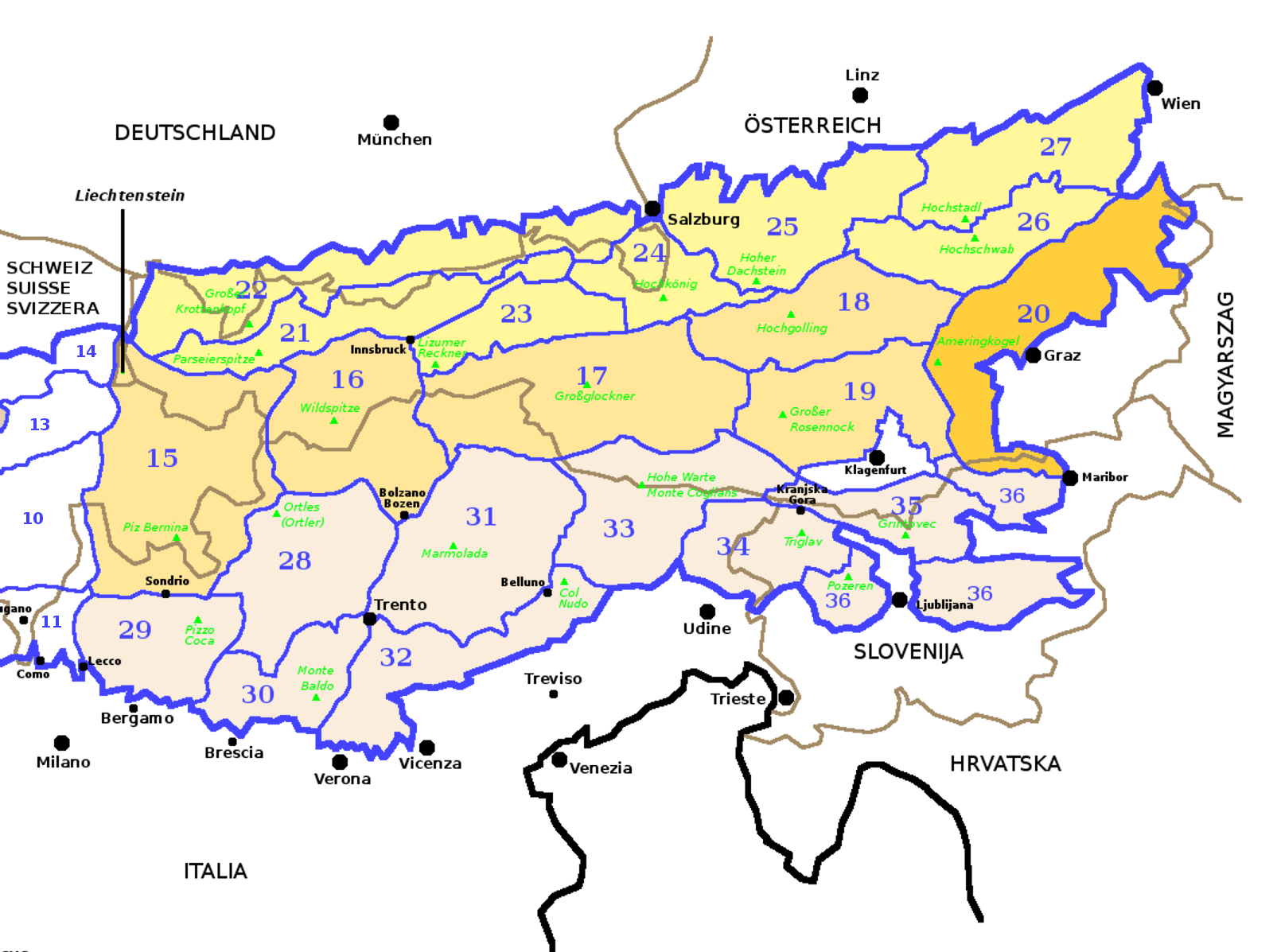
- Styrian Prealps (section nr.20) within Eastern Alps
- Countries: Austria, Slovenia and Hungary
- Settlement(s): Graz, Maribor
- Parent range: Alps
- Borders on: Northern Styrian Alps, Eastern Tauern Alps, Carinthian-Styrian Alps and Slovenian Prealps

Geology
- Orogeny: Alpine orogeny

The Styrian Prealps (in German Steirisches Randgebirge, in Slovenian Štajersko Robno hribovje, in Hungarian Stájer Elő-Alpok) is the proposed name for a subdivision of mountains in a new, and as yet unadopted, classification of the Alps, located in Austria and, marginally, in Slovenia and Hungary.

== Geography ==
The whole range is drained by the tributaries of the Danube river.

=== SOIUSA classification ===
According to SOIUSA (International Standardized Mountain Subdivision of the Alps) the Styrian Prealps are an Alpine section, classified in the following way:

- main part = Eastern Alps
- major sector = Central Eastern Alps
- section = Styrian Prealps
- code = II/A-20

=== Subdivision ===
The Styrian Prealps are divided into four subsections:

- North-western Styrian Prealps (Stubalpe; Gleinalpe; Western Graz Highlands) - SOIUSA code:II/A-20.I;
- South-western Styrian Prealps (Koralpe; Reinischkögel; Kobansko) - SOIUSA code:II/A-20.II
- Central Styrian Prealps (Fischbach Alps; Eastern Graz Highlands) - SOIUSA code:II/A-20.III;
- Eastern Styrian Prealps (Wechsel-Joglland; Bucklige Welt; Bernstein-Güns; Rosalien-Ödenburg) - SOIUSA code:II/A-20.IV.

== Notable summits ==
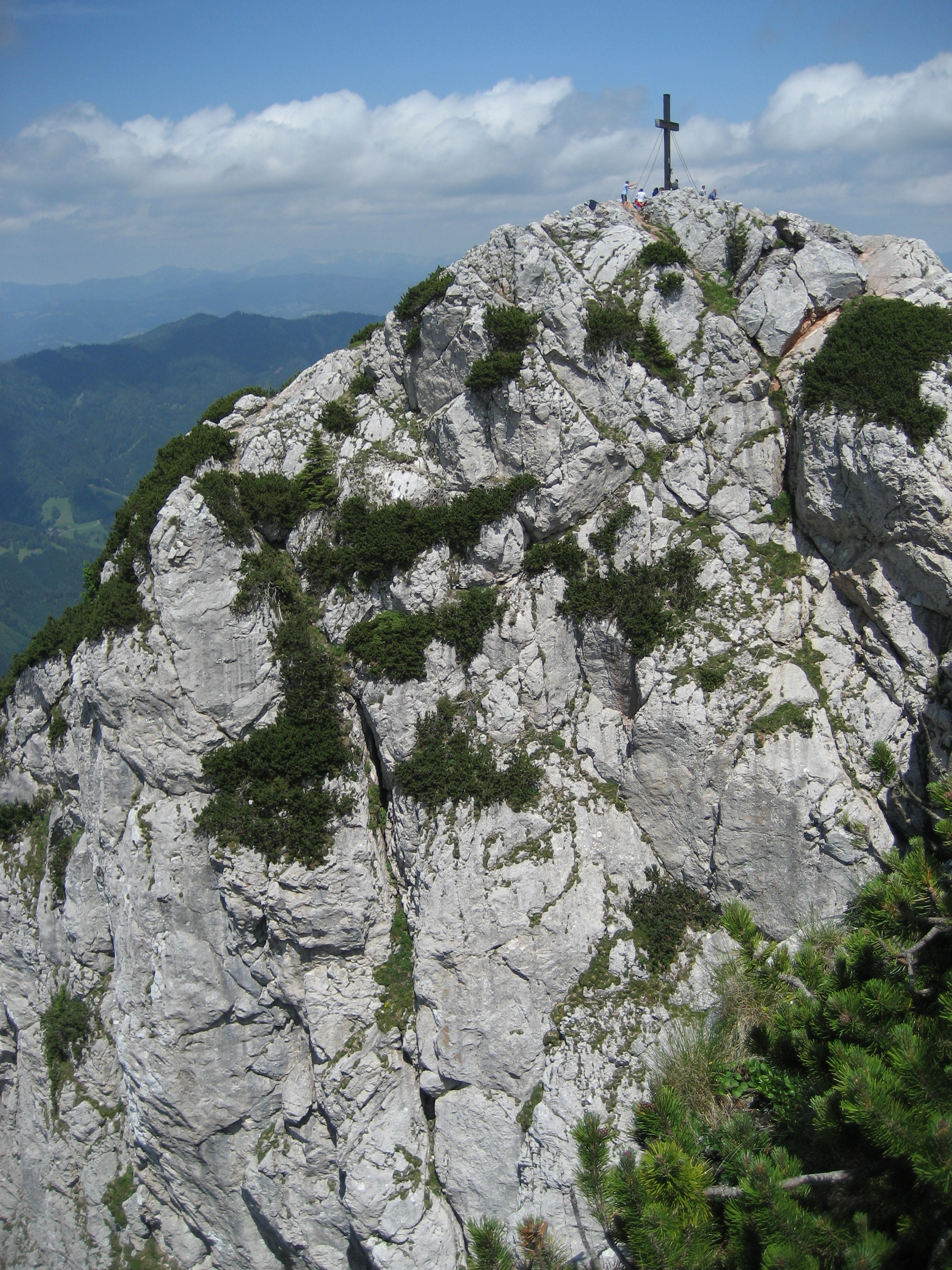
The Hochlantsch (1,720 m)

Some notable summits of the Styrian Prealps are:

Name	metres	feet
Ameringkogel	2,184	7,164
Großer Speikkogel	2,140	7,019
Stuhleck	1,782	5,845
Wechsel	1,743	5,717
Hochlantsch	1,720	5,642
Košenjak	1,522	4,992
