= Fischbach Alps =

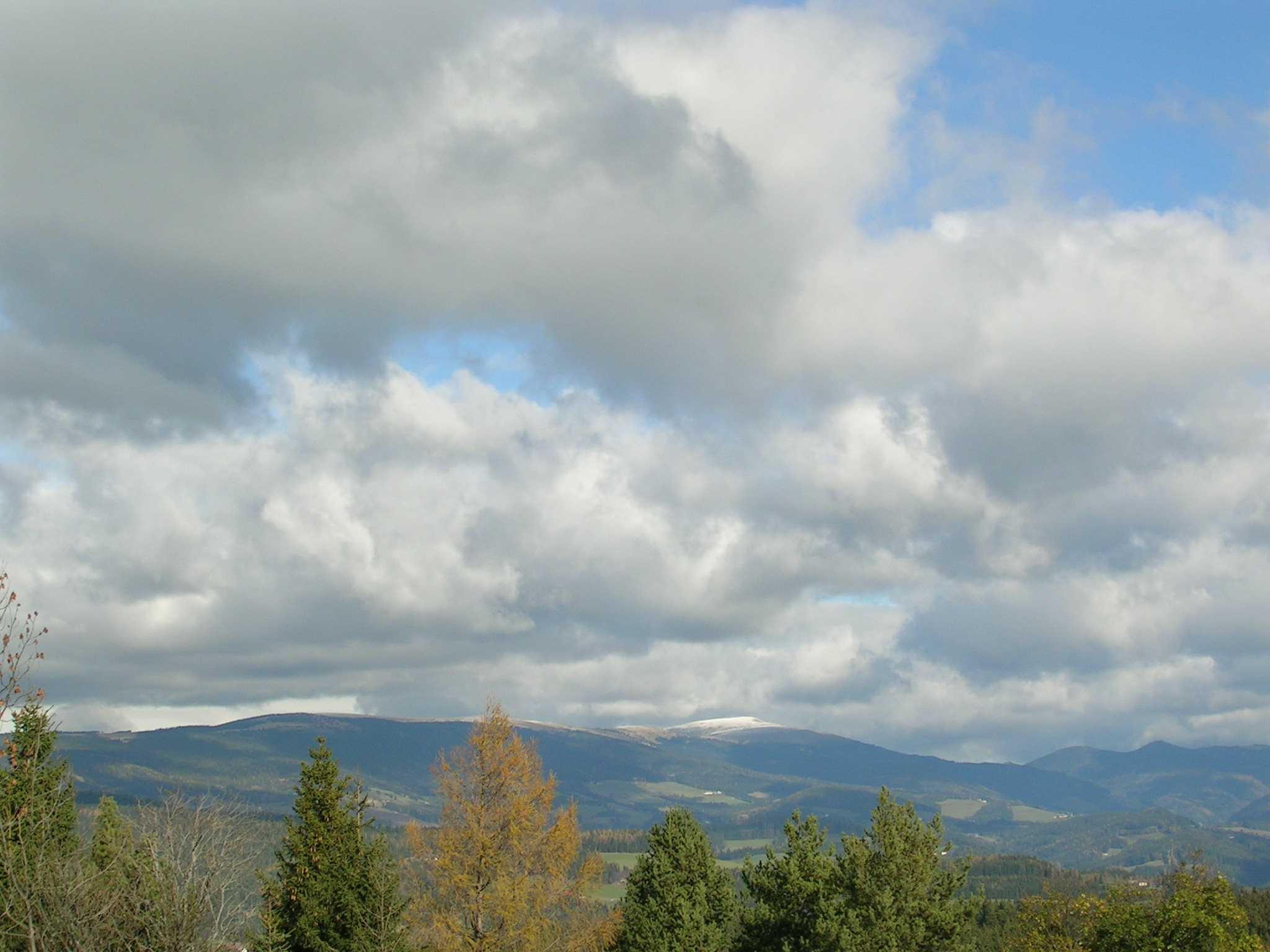
- View of the Fischbach Alps. Left: Rattner Alm, Pretul, Centre: Stuhleck; Right: Großer Pfaff, Kleiner Pfaff and the Pfaffen Saddle

Highest point
- Peak: Stuhleck
- Elevation: 1,782 m (5,846 ft)

Dimensions
- Length: 30 km (19 mi)

Geography
- State(s): Styria, Austria
- Range coordinates: 47°34′27″N 15°47′24″E
- Parent range: Prealps East of the Mur

The Fischbach Alps (German: Fischbacher Alpen) are part of the Prealps East of the Mur.

== Location and countryside ==
The Fischbach Alps are a gentle, elongated mountain range in the Alps, with the character of a low mountain range and covered in forests and Alpine meadows. They are located in the Styria in Austria, south of the Mürz. They are the eastern outliers of the Central Alps and part of the Styrian Prealps.

They extend from the water gap of the Mur in the west to the Feistritz Saddle in the east. Their highest summit is the Stuhleck (1,782 m (AA)). Other high points are the Pretul (1,656 m) and Amundsenhöhe (1,666 m), the Teufelstein (1,498 m), the Stanglalpe (1,490 m), the Sauernkogel (1,451 m), the Steinriegel (1,577 m), the Hochschlag (1,580 m) and the Rennfeld (1,629 m).

== Culture ==
The mountains are named after the village of Fischbach.

In the Fischbach Alps lies Alpl (in the municipality of Krieglach), the birthplace of Peter Rosegger. In 1998 a broadcast in the ORF series, Klingendes Österreich, highlighted the Fischbach Alps. Under the title of Gebirge ohne Härte: Die Fischbacher Alpen the programme covered the most important villages and peaks in the Fischbach Alps.

== Gallery ==
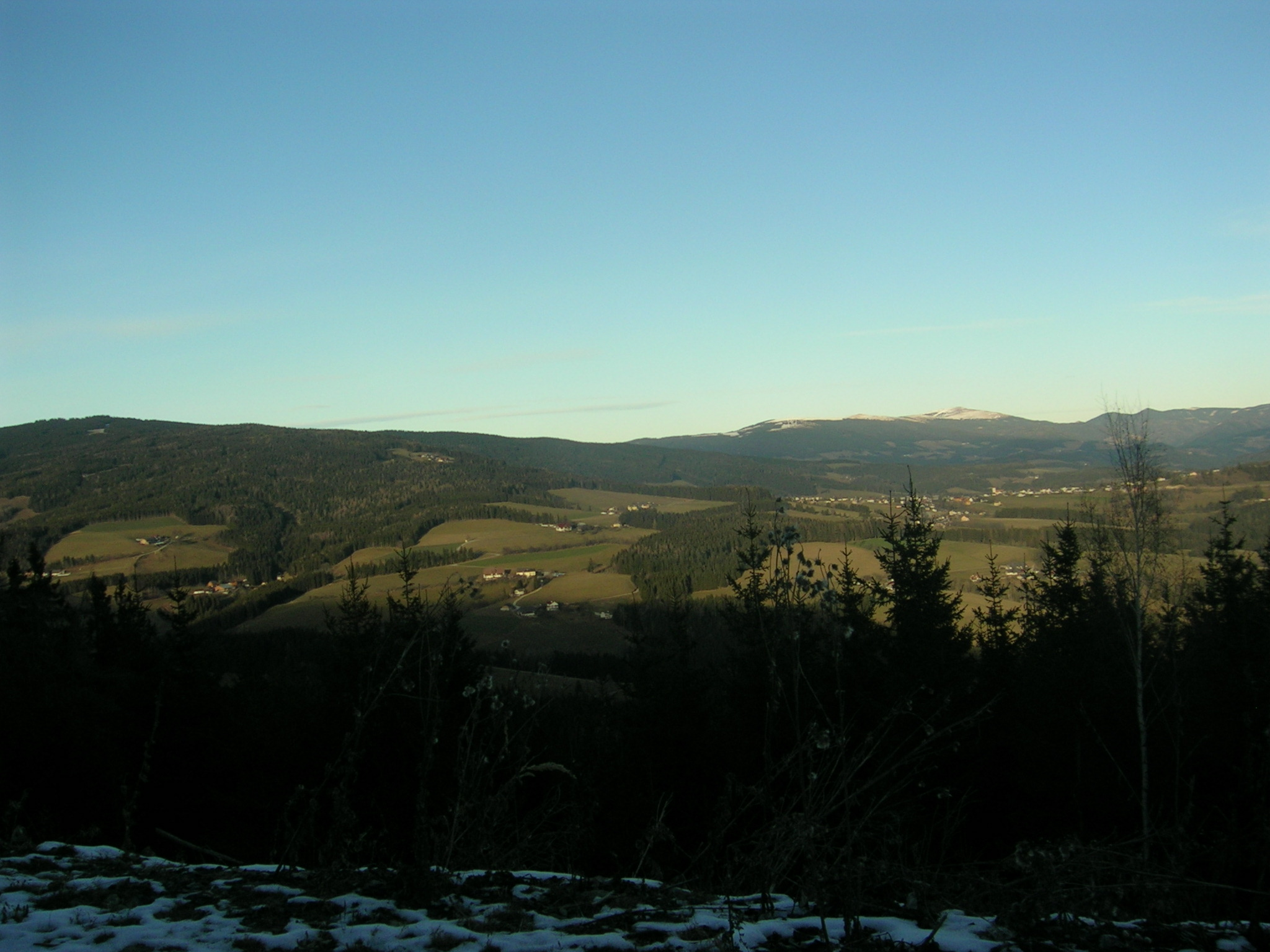
Left, the Teufelstein, centre right, the Stuhleck, foreground, the village of Fischbach

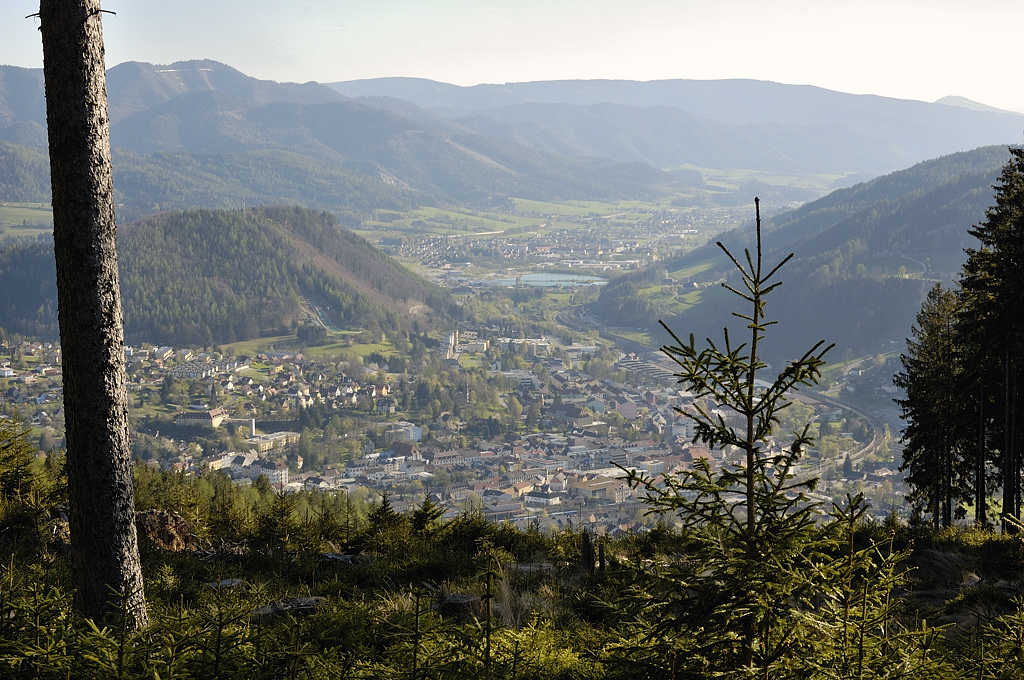
Near Mürzzuschlag

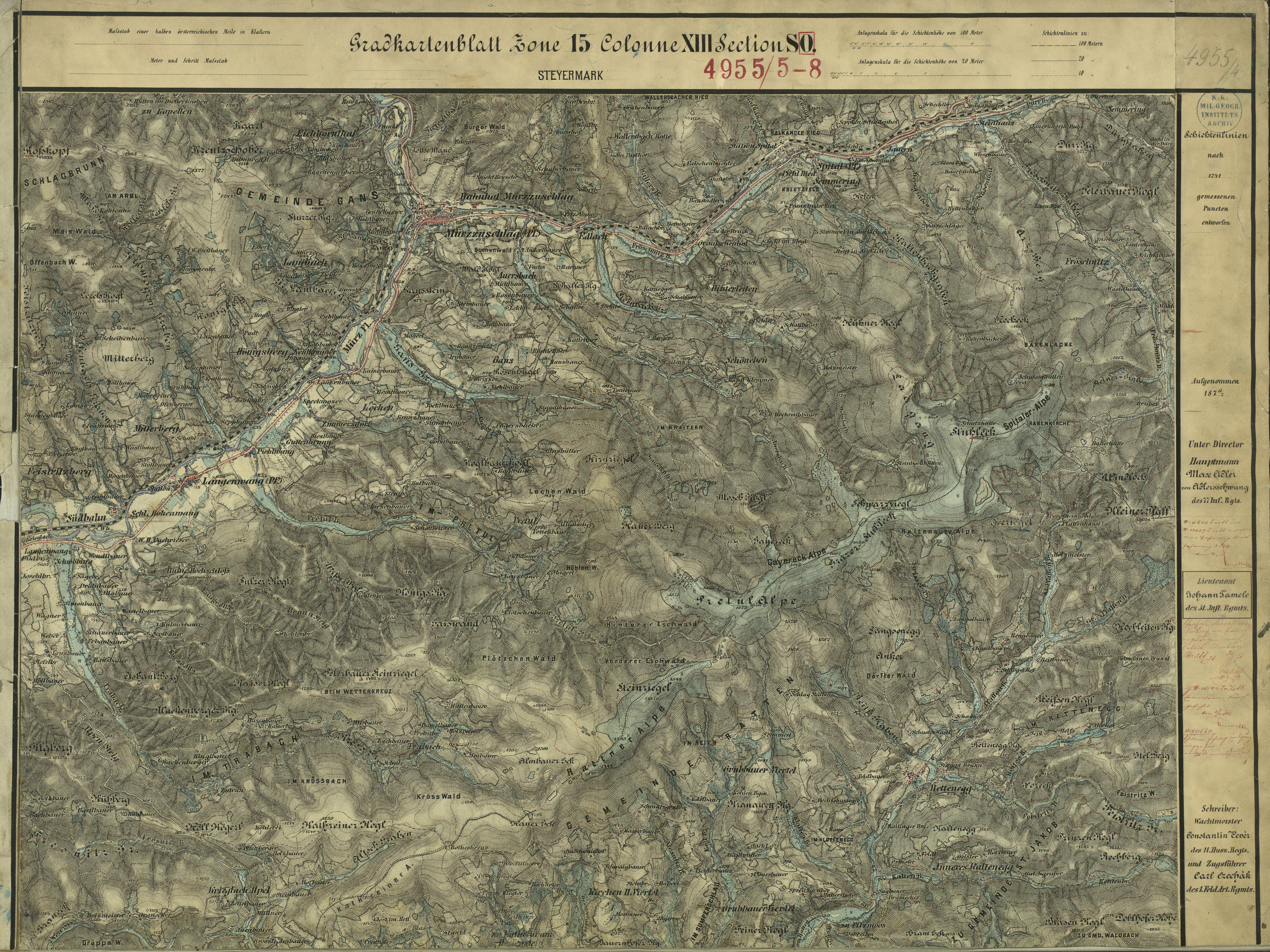
The Fischbach Alps (centre) around 1876 (photograph by the Landesaufnahme)
