= Joglland =

Mountain range in the Austrian Alps

Coordinates: 47°26′4″N 15°51′48″E

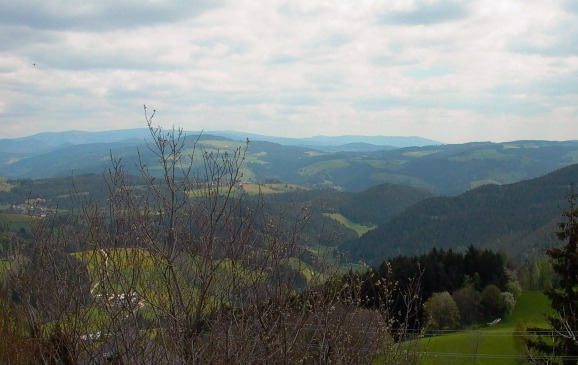
The Joglland near Fischbach

The Joglland is a heavily forested low mountain region in the Hartberg-Fürstenfeld and Weiz districts of northeastern Styria, Austria. Today, it forms the tourist region of Joglland–Waldheimat (Kraftspendedörfer Joglland).

Its name is probably derived from Jakob (perhaps from the village of Sankt Jakob im Walde) which, in this region is often corrupted to Joggl or Jackl. The region is described in the literature by the Styrian poet, Peter Rosegger, who grew up as a farmer's son in Alpl.

== Location and landscape ==
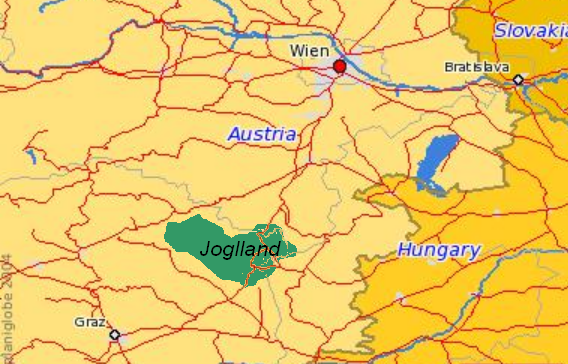
Location of the region of Joglland - Waldheimat, between Vienna and Graz, southeast of the Semmering

The Joglland lies within East Styria between the Wechsel, the upper Feistritz valley, the Safenbach, and the area of Hartberg-Friedberg. It forms a sub-group of the Prealps East of the Mur.

To the north lies the Semmering region, to the northeast is the region known as the Bucklige Welt. To the northwest are the Fischbach Alps, and beyond them the lower Mürz valley. To the west and southwest are the Graz Highlands. To the south are the East Styrian Hills, and to the southeast is South Burgenland – The latter already forming part of the southeast Alpine Foreland, facing the Pannonian Plain.

The highest points of this region, with its Mittelgebirge character are the summits of the Wechsel massif – such as the Hochwechsel (1,742 m), Herrenstein (1,448 m) and Hochkogel (1,314 m) – the Wildwiesen (1,254 m), the Masenberg (1,261 m), and the Rabenwaldkogel (1,281 m).

The region is drained by the Feistritz and Lafnitz rivers.
