= Rennfeld =

Mountain in the Fischbach Alps

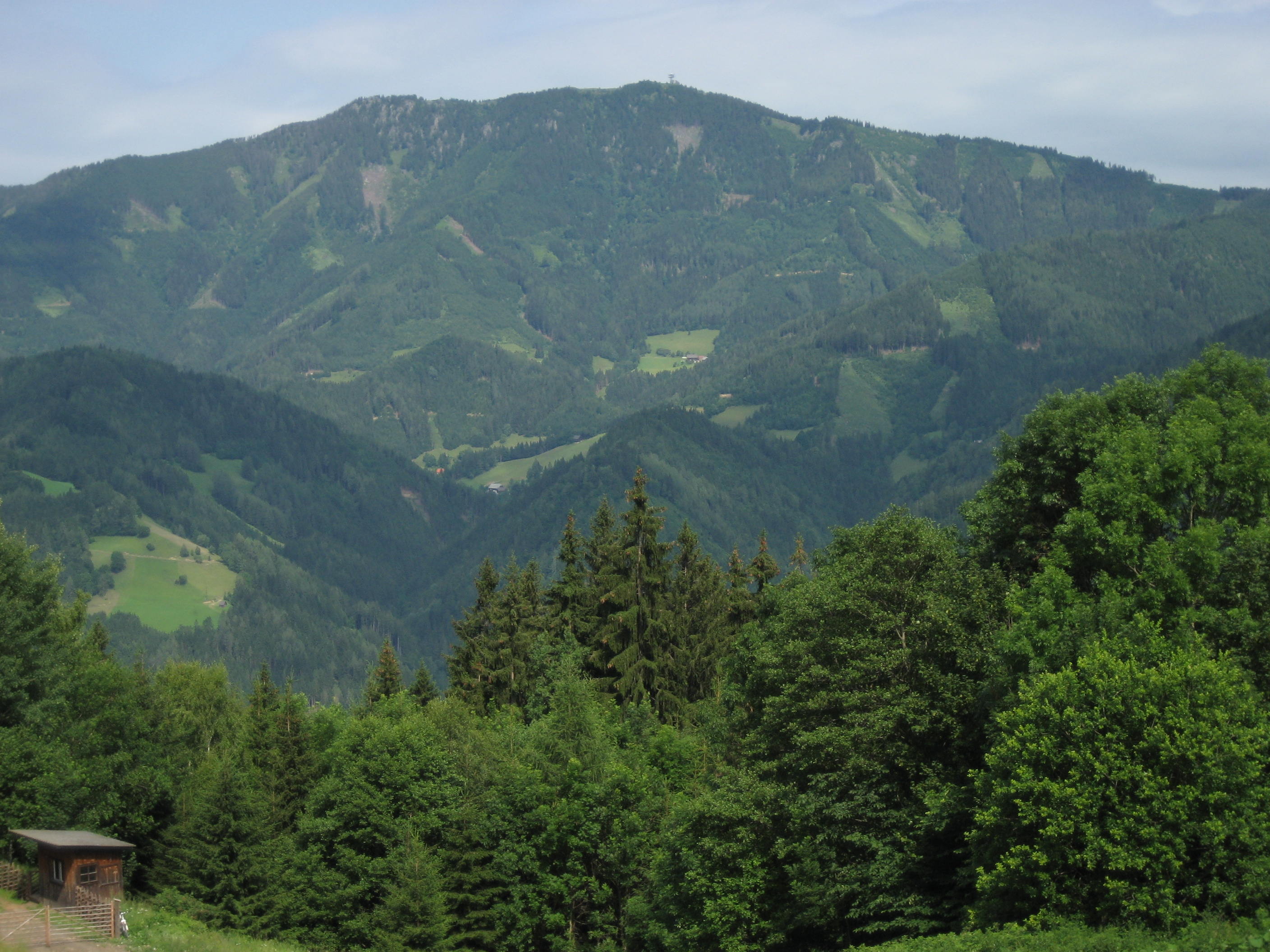
- Rennfeld

Highest point
- Elevation: 1,629 m (5,344 ft)
- Prominence: 628 m (2,060 ft)
- Coordinates: 47°24′N 15°22′E

Geography
- Location within Austria
- Location: Steiermark, Austria
- Parent range: Prealps East of the Mur

Rennfeld (1,629 m) is a mountain in the Fischbach Alps, part of the Prealps east of the Mur. It is the westernmost peak of the range.

Rennfeld is the highest of the three hausbergs of the city of Bruck an der Mur and towers over a kilometre above the Mur Valley to the west. Heavily forested on its slopes, its summit is a grassy knoll.

The slopes of the mountain are dotted with hiking trails, and although not technically difficult, reaching the summit is strenuous due to the considerable altitude gain and the steepness of its slopes. The easiest route is from Frauenberg.
