= Sinabelkirchen =

- Municipality
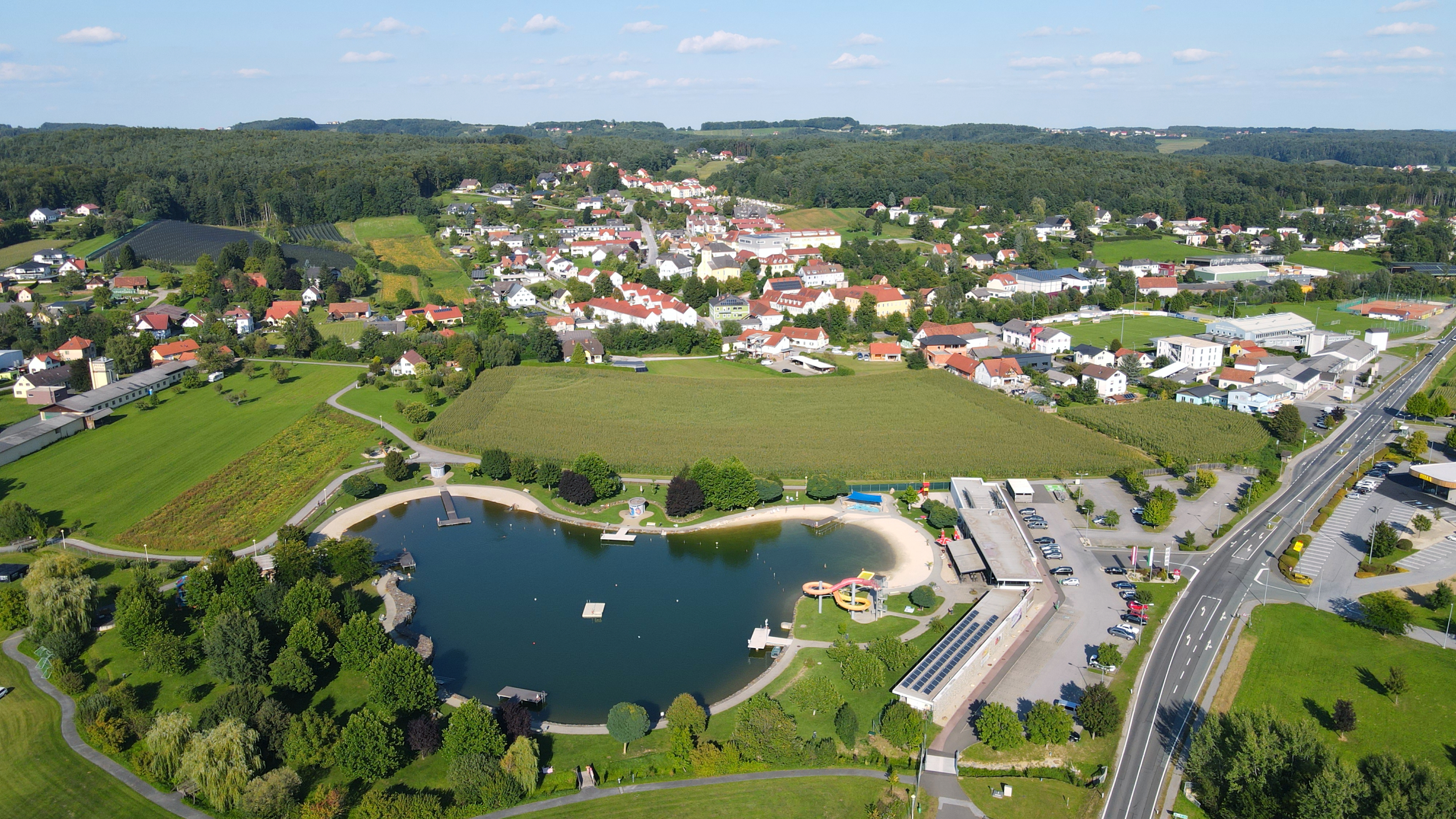

- Coat of arms

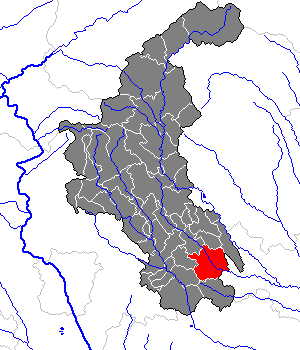
- Location within Weiz district

- Location within Austria
- Coordinates: 47°06′00″N 15°49′00″E
- Country: Austria
- State: Styria
- District: Weiz

Government
  - Mayor: Emanuel Pfeifer (ÖVP)

Area
  - Total: 37.09 km^{2} (14.32 sq mi)
- Elevation: 323 m (1,060 ft)

Population (January 1, 2023)
  - Total: 4,487
  - Density: 121.0/km^{2} (313.3/sq mi)
- Time zone: UTC+1 (CET)
  - Summer (DST): UTC+2 (CEST)
- Postal code: 8261
- Area code: 03118
- Vehicle registration: WZ
- Website: www.sinabelkirchen.com

Sinabelkirchen is a Marktgemeinde (municipality) in the Weiz district of Styria, Austria. It lies in the Ilz River valley in the eastern Styrian Hills at about 320–330 m above sea level. The municipality covers roughly 37.1 km² and includes the main village of Sinabelkirchen plus hamlets (Katastralgemeinden) such as Egelsdorf, Frösau, Gnies, Nagl, Obergroßau, Untergroßau, Unterrettenbach and others. The South Autobahn (A2) runs through Sinabelkirchen, giving quick highway access to Graz (≈35 km west) and the Vienna–Graz corridor.

== Geography ==
Sinabelkirchen is located in the Ilz Valley (Ilztal), within the East Styrian Hills (Oststeirisches Hügelland) in southeastern Austria. This region is characterized by undulating landscapes dominated by a mix of farmland, meadows, and forested areas.

The Ilz River, a right tributary of the Feistritz, flows through the municipality and contributes to the area's agricultural viability and scenic environment. Elevations in Sinabelkirchen range from approximately 317 to 327 metres above sea level, with the municipal office situated at around 317 metres.

The climate is temperate and typical of eastern Styria, with warm summers and cold winters. The natural landscape is intersected by a network of forest and field trails, supporting outdoor activities such as hiking and cycling.

Local hospitality is reflected in the presence of traditional country inns and seasonal taverns known as Buschenschenken, where local wine and fruit products are served. On the outskirts of the town, the SINIWELT bath and leisure park offers indoor and outdoor swimming pools and a campsite, serving as a recreational hub for residents and visitors alike.

== History ==
Evidence of human habitation in the area surrounding Sinabelkirchen dates back to prehistoric times, indicating that the region has been settled for thousands of years. Despite this, the recorded history of the town itself begins around the 12th century.

The earliest known written mention of Sinabelkirchen appears in a document from 1351, where it is referred to as Synewelkirichen. The name likely derives from the Old High German word siniwel, meaning “round,” possibly referencing an early circular church located at the original settlement.

The village expanded over the centuries, and in 1729, the local church was elevated to parish status. Administrative reforms in the 20th century further shaped the modern municipality. In 1952 and again in 1968, neighboring communities were incorporated into Sinabelkirchen, consolidating its municipal boundaries. In 1997, the municipality was granted a coat of arms and officially designated a Marktgemeinde (municipality)

During the National Socialist period, Sinabelkirchen, like many Austrian communities, was affected by the policies and violence of the regime. Two local residents, Maria Ertl (b. 1920) and Simon Gölles (b. 1905), became victims of Nazi persecution. Ertl, a woman with disabilities, was deported in 1941 to the Hartheim killing center as part of the Nazi “euthanasia” program and murdered there. Gölles, known for his resistance to the regime, suffered repeated abuse and persecution. In October 2023, Stolpersteine (stumbling stones) were placed in the town square to commemorate their lives and the historical context of their deaths.

These memorials form part of the broader historical remembrance efforts within the municipality, reflecting both its medieval origins and its experience during the 20th century.

== Demographics ==
As of 1 January 2024, Sinabelkirchen had a population of 4,485, reflecting a steady increase in recent decades. The population surpassed 4,000 in the year 2000 and reached approximately 4,500 by May 2023. With a total area of 37.09 km², the municipality has a population density of about 120 inhabitants per square kilometer.

Roughly 7.9% of the population in 2024 were non-Austrian nationals, a figure that reflects moderate demographic diversity for a rural Styrian municipality. The age distribution is broadly representative of the region: approximately 20% of residents are under the age of 20, while about 17 to 18% are aged 65 and older.

The dominant language spoken in Sinabelkirchen is German, consistent with the linguistic and cultural context of Styria. The majority of the population adheres to Roman Catholicism, as indicated by the presence and central role of the local parish church. Smaller numbers of residents may belong to other religious groups or identify as non-religious, following broader trends observed in rural Austria.

In recent years, Sinabelkirchen has developed into a desirable residential community, benefiting from its accessible transportation links. The local economy includes a mix of employment sectors, including small businesses, agriculture, and commuter-based jobs in nearby towns and cities.

== Economy ==
Historically based on agriculture, Sinabelkirchen's economy underwent significant diversification in the 20th century. Since the mid-20th century, the municipality has developed from a predominantly agricultural community into a local economic and residential centre. Its strategic location near the A2 Süd Autobahn has facilitated the establishment of industrial and commercial enterprises.

One of the largest employers in the municipality is Magna Steyr Fuel Systems, which operates a production facility in Untergroßau, a cadastral community within Sinabelkirchen. The plant specializes in the manufacturing of automotive fuel tanks and was expanded in 2015 by an additional 3,400 square metres of production space. As of recent reports, the facility employs approximately 280 workers.

The industrial zone in Untergroßau has attracted a range of small and medium-sized enterprises (SMEs), particularly in sectors such as mechanical engineering, food processing, and service industries. Despite this industrial growth, agriculture remains an integral part of the local economy, especially in the surrounding villages. Farming includes both crop cultivation and livestock production, and the region is known for its direct-to-consumer agricultural products, including wine and specialty foods. These are often sold through local Buschenschenken (seasonal wine taverns) and a weekly farmers' market held in the town centre.

The local economy today is characterized by a diverse mix of manufacturing, construction, trade, and agriculture. Additionally, Sinabelkirchen has become a commuter town, with many residents working in nearby urban centres such as Gleisdorf and Graz.

== Infrastructure ==
=== Transportation ===
Sinabelkirchen is well-connected within the regional and national transportation network. The A2 Süd Autobahn (Vienna–Graz motorway) passes through the municipality, with a local exit providing direct access to Graz and the wider Austrian motorway system. Regional bus services (RegioBus) operate on the Graz–Fürstenfeld corridor, offering regular public transport connections to neighboring towns and cities. Local roads link the main town with its outlying villages and hamlets. A flexible community shuttle service, known as “Sammeltaxi SAM,” is available to residents for local transport needs.

=== Education ===
Sinabelkirchen provides educational facilities primarily for young children and adolescents. The municipality operates a kindergarten and daycare centre, as well as two schools: a Volksschule (primary school) and a Mittelschule (lower secondary school), which together enroll approximately 320 students.Older students typically commute to Gleisdorf or Weiz for upper secondary and vocational education. Extracurricular programs in music and sports are supported through regional institutions, such as the Musikschule Gleisdorf.

=== Healthcare ===
Basic healthcare services are available within Sinabelkirchen. The town hosts a local pharmacy (Apotheke Sinabelkirchen) and is served by visiting general practitioners. For specialist treatment and hospital care, residents generally rely on nearby facilities in Gleisdorf and Weiz, located approximately 15–20 km away. The municipality also participates in regional healthcare cooperatives and offers services related to elder care.

=== Public services ===
The municipality is served by a network of five volunteer fire brigades, each responsible for one of the town’s constituent villages. Local administration is managed by the Gemeindeamt (municipal office), which handles civil registry services, permits, and public communication, including a quarterly community newsletter. Public utilities such as water supply, sewage, and waste management are operated in cooperation with neighboring municipalities.

Sinabelkirchen is part of the Businessregion Gleisdorf and the Steirisches Vulkanland, two regional initiatives that promote economic development, tourism, and cultural collaboration across eastern Styria.

== Culture and community life ==
Sinabelkirchen maintains an active cultural and communal life, supported by a range of local clubs (Vereine) and regularly held events. Notable organizations include the Marktmusik Sinabelkirchen (town brass band), the local sports association SV Sinabelkirchen, the cultural group Rundum Kultur, and various youth and civic organizations. These groups coordinate a variety of activities throughout the year, such as concerts, theatrical performances, sports tournaments, and cultural evenings. For example, Rundum Kultur organizes literary readings and operetta performances, while the Marktmusik performs at community and regional events.

Key venues for cultural and public gatherings include the Sport- und Kulturhalle (sports and culture hall) and the Siniwelt leisure complex, which host concerts, fairs, school functions, and other events.

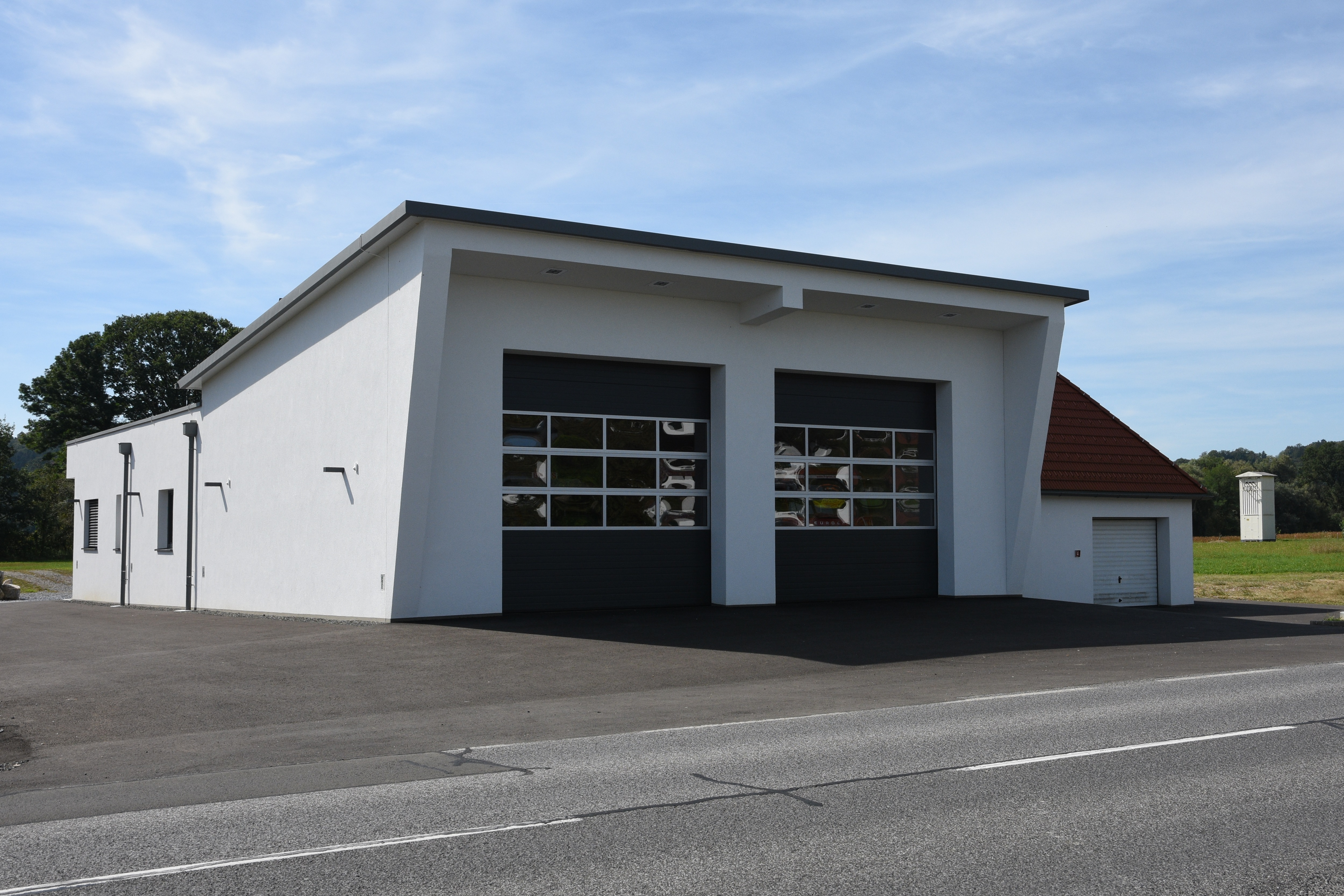
Exterior view of the fire station in Gnies Picture was taken by Iswoar

Annual traditions include the Kirtag (parish festival), typically held in late summer, as well as a Faschingsball (Carnival masquerade ball) and various seasonal markets. The municipality also participates in regional customs such as Sonnwendfeiern (midsummer solstice fires) and communal clean-up days in spring. In 2018, Sinabelkirchen hosted the Steirischer Chorfestival, a regional choir event.

Recreational activities are supported by several clubs that organize hiking and cycling excursions in the surrounding countryside. The presence of five volunteer fire brigades contributes to the community’s social life through Feuerwehrfeste (fire brigade festivals), which are regular social events in the villages. Additional community amenities include a public library (open weekly) and a central children’s playground located on the Marktplatz.

== Landmarks and attractions ==
=== Parish Church of St. Bartholomew (Pfarrkirche St. Bartholomäus) ===
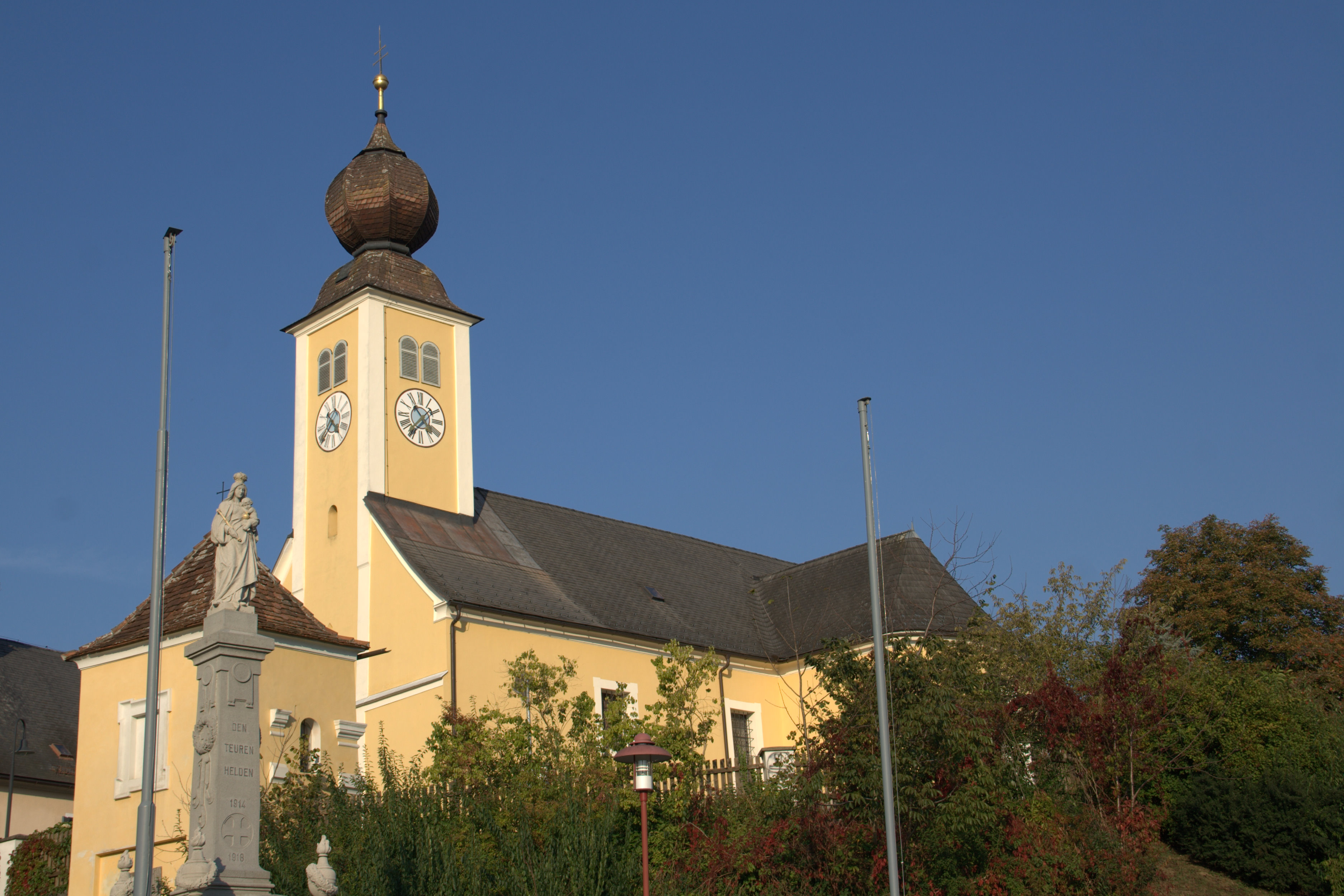
Exterior of the Parish Church of St. Bartholomew. Picture was taken by Wolf32at.

The parish church is Sinabelkirchen’s principal historic landmark. It was first documented in 1351 and was rebuilt around 1690. In 1729, it was elevated to the status of a parish church. Architecturally, the church features a Baroque bell tower, a Gothic-style portal, and several richly carved altars. Interior elements include historic frescoes. The building is listed as a protected cultural monument.

=== Siniwelt Bath and Leisure Park ===
This is a modern recreational complex located on the outskirts of Sinabelkirchen. It includes indoor and outdoor swimming pools, a water slide, a sauna area, and an adjacent campsite. Siniwelt serves as a regional attraction, especially for families and wellness tourists visiting from southeast Styria.

=== Ilz Valley (Ilztal) ===
The Ilz River flows through the municipality and shapes much of the surrounding landscape. The Ilz Valley is known for its scenic walking and cycling routes that pass through farmland, forests, and rolling hills. Along these trails, several small chapels and wayside shrines are located on hilltops or near villages. The area is part of the Steirisches Vulkanland, a recognized tourism region in eastern Styria.

=== Traditional Styrian Architecture ===
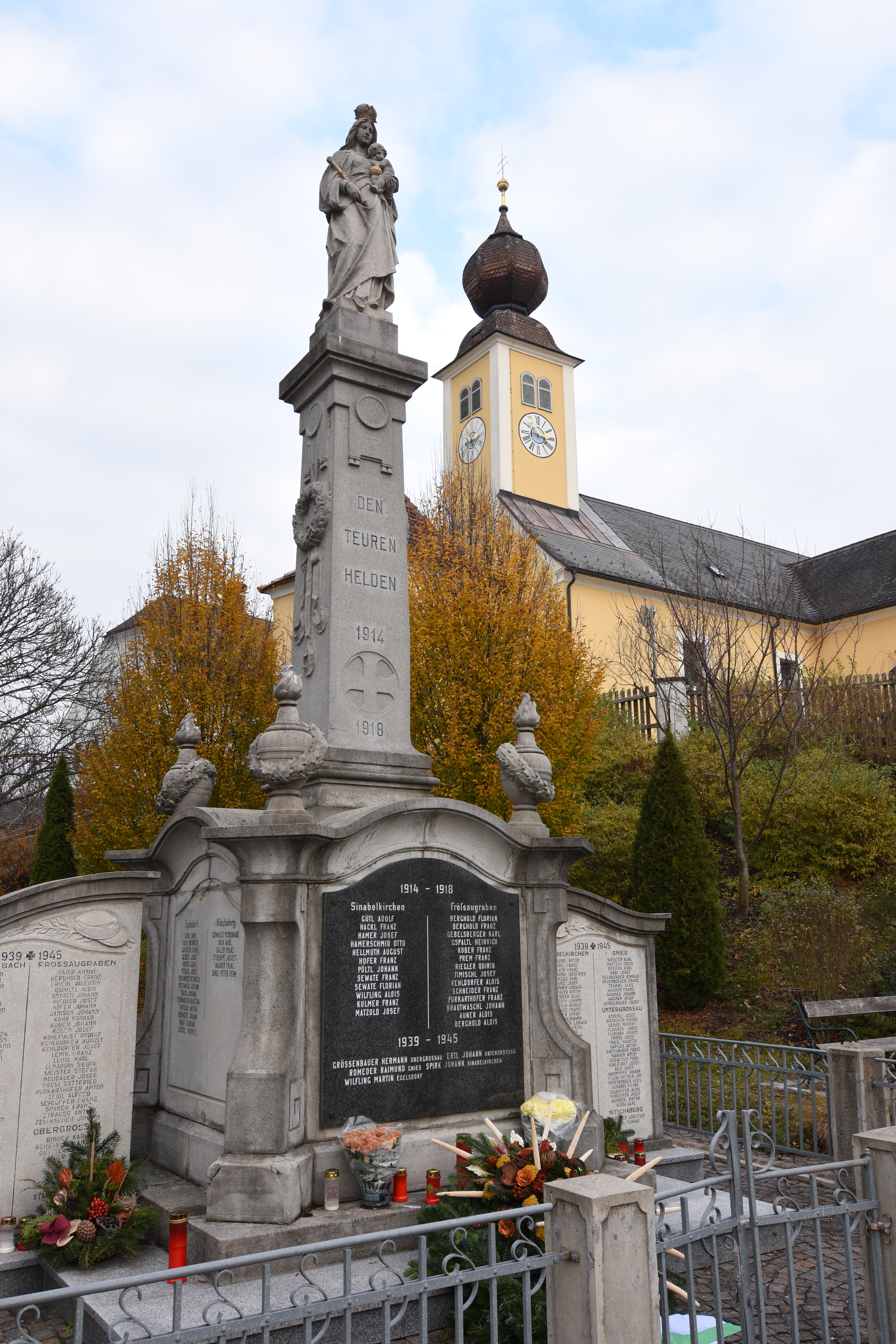
Kriegerdenkmal (War Memorial). Picture taken by Nxr-at

The town centre and surrounding villages include several examples of traditional Styrian farmhouse architecture. Notable features include wooden balconies, gabled roofs, and stone construction. These buildings reflect the rural cultural heritage of the region.

=== War Memorial ===
Located in the town centre, the war memorial commemorates local residents who died in the world wars. It consists of a stone monument with inscribed names and is maintained as part of local remembrance culture.

=== Town Hall (Rathaus) ===
Sinabelkirchen’s municipal administration is housed in a modern town hall located on the historical market square. While the building itself is contemporary, it occupies a central place in the town’s civic and historical landscape.

=== Village Chapels ===
Each of the villages that form part of the Sinabelkirchen municipality has its own Roman Catholic chapel. Notable among these is the chapel of St. Oswald in the village of Gnies. These chapels serve as local places of worship and are often associated with village festivals and traditions.

== Notable people ==
There are no nationally or internationally prominent individuals specifically associated with Sinabelkirchen. However, two local residents from the Nazi era, Maria Ertl and Simon Gölles, are commemorated with Stolpersteine (memorial cobblestones) placed in 2023 in recognition of their persecution and deaths under the Nazi regime (see History).

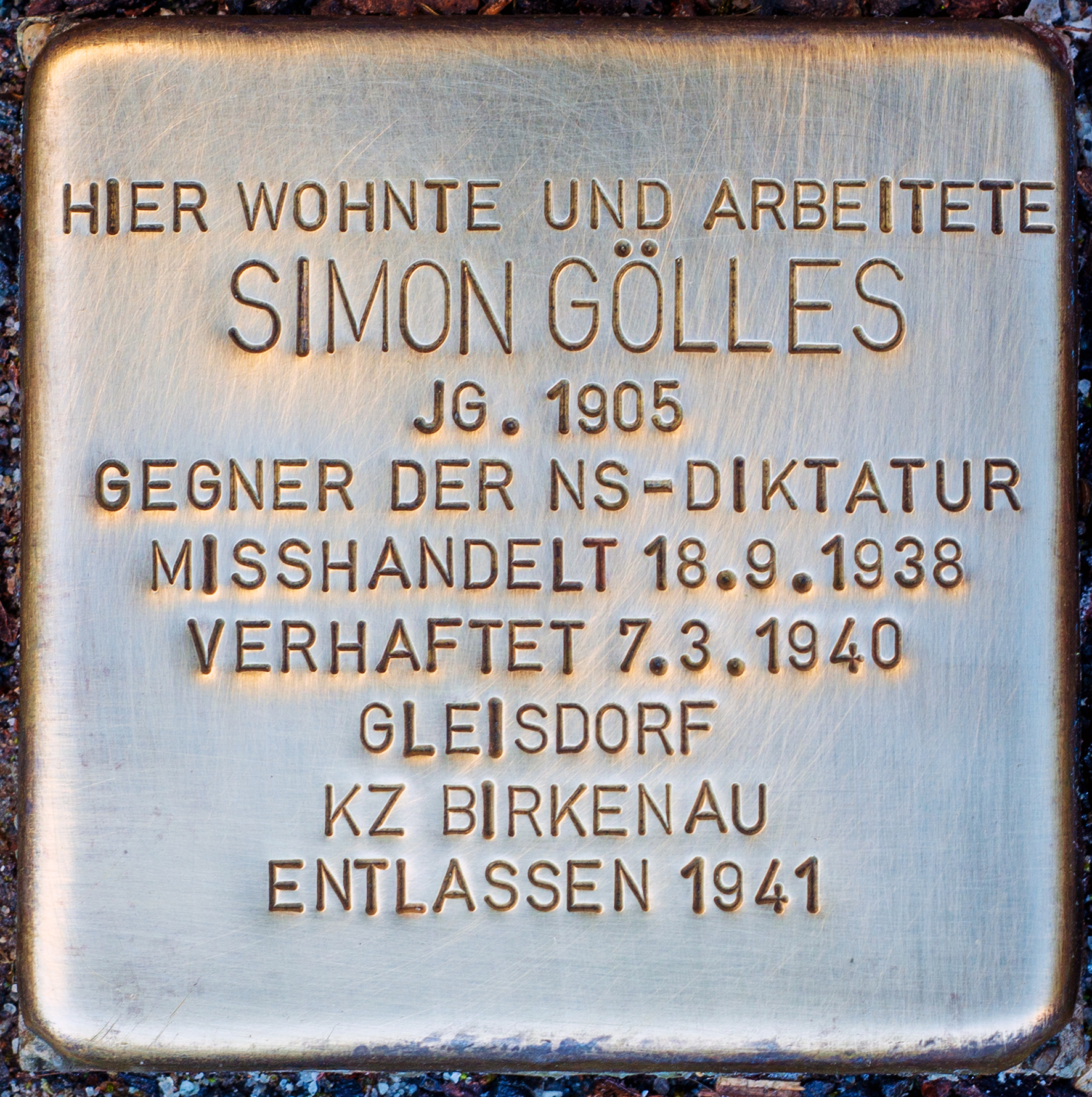
Stolperstein for Simon Gölles. Image was taken by Francisco Peralta Torrejón

The current mayor, as of 2025, is Emanuel Pfeifer, a member of the Austrian People's Party (ÖVP). He has held office for several terms. His predecessor, Herbert Tahedl of the Social Democratic Party of Austria (SPÖ), served as mayor from the 1980s until the early 2010s and played a significant role in the town’s modern development.

While no nationally known public figures originate from the town, Sinabelkirchen has an active local community that includes artists, educators, and clergy who contribute to its cultural and civic life.

== Recent developments ==
In recent years, Sinabelkirchen has experienced continued growth and modernization. As of May 2023, the municipality's population reached approximately 4,500 residents, attributed in part to new housing developments and inward migration.

The municipality has undertaken various infrastructure projects. A major broadband expansion initiative began in the early 2020s, aimed at improving fiber-optic internet access across the region. Local residents were invited to request new connections as part of this rollout. In 2025, Austria's Federal Survey Office announced updated topographic mapping work in the area.

Sinabelkirchen continues to participate in regional development programs, including the KLAR! climate adaptation initiative, and cooperates with the Steirisches Vulkanland tourism and economic network to promote sustainable practices and local tourism.

Economic development has also included ongoing expansion of the Untergroßau industrial park, which hosts several small and medium enterprises. Cultural life in the municipality has resumed post-pandemic, with regular events such as concerts and fairs once again held in community venues. In addition, new local associations, including a walking group, have been established, contributing to civic engagement and community well-being.

Recent municipal efforts have focused on promoting sustainable growth, enhancing digital infrastructure, and improving quality of life for residents.

== See also ==
- History of Austria
- History of Styria
- Styria
- Weiz District
