= East Styrian Hills =

Coordinates: 47.0667°N 15.8083°E

The East Styrian Hill Country or East Styrian Hills (German: Oststeirisches Hügelland or Oststeirisches Riedelland), is a rolling, hill country region, known as Hügelland, in the southeast of the Austrian state of Styria.

== Geography ==
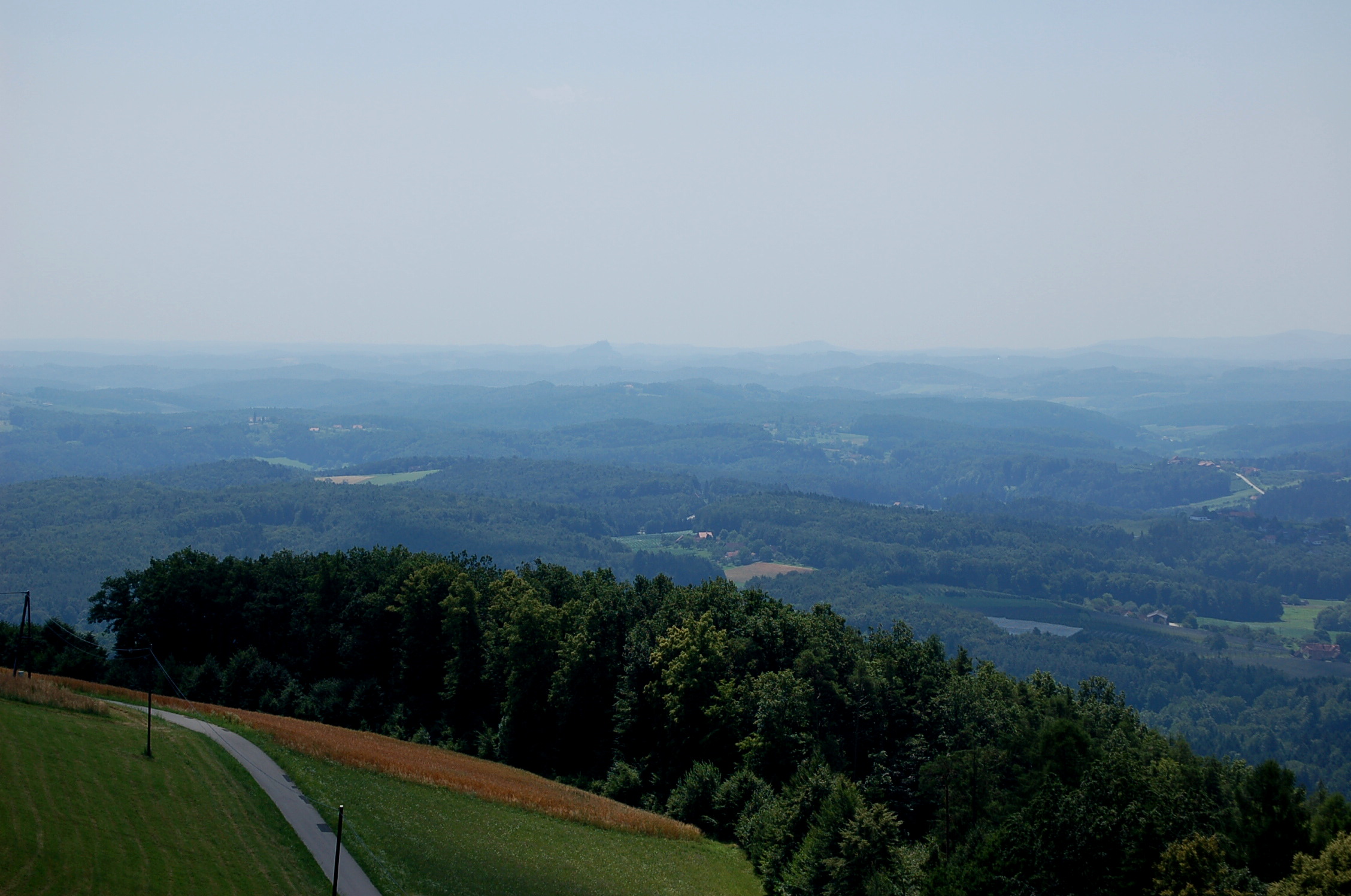
The East Styrian Hills south of Herberstein

The East Styrian Hill Country is part of the Alpine Foreland in the East and Southeast and extend over large parts of East Styria and Southeast Styria. They are characterised by elongated hill ridges or interfluves (Riedel). They are bounded in the west and south by the River Mur and in the north by the Prealps East of the Mur, especially the eastern Graz Uplands, the prominent Kulm massif and the Joglland with its peak, the Masenberg. To the east it is bounded by the Lafnitz river.

The East Styrian Hills cover an area of about 50 × 80 km, but continue as a landscape type geologically and morphologically:

- in the west as the smaller West Styrian Hills (Weststeirisches Hügelland), its boundary being formed by the Mur and both landscapes being called the Styrian Hills
- and in the east in the narrow South Burgenland and towards West Hungary, where it is bounded in the north by the South Burgenland Hills (Südburgenländische Schwelle) and in the east by the Pannonian Basin
- in a southerly direction (Slovenia) the hills continue - rather differently divided - as the Slovene Hills (German: Windische Bühel, Slovene: Slovenske gorice) in Lower Styria (Spodnja Štajerska) and Goričko in the Prekmurje (Upper Mur region) for another 30 km or so.

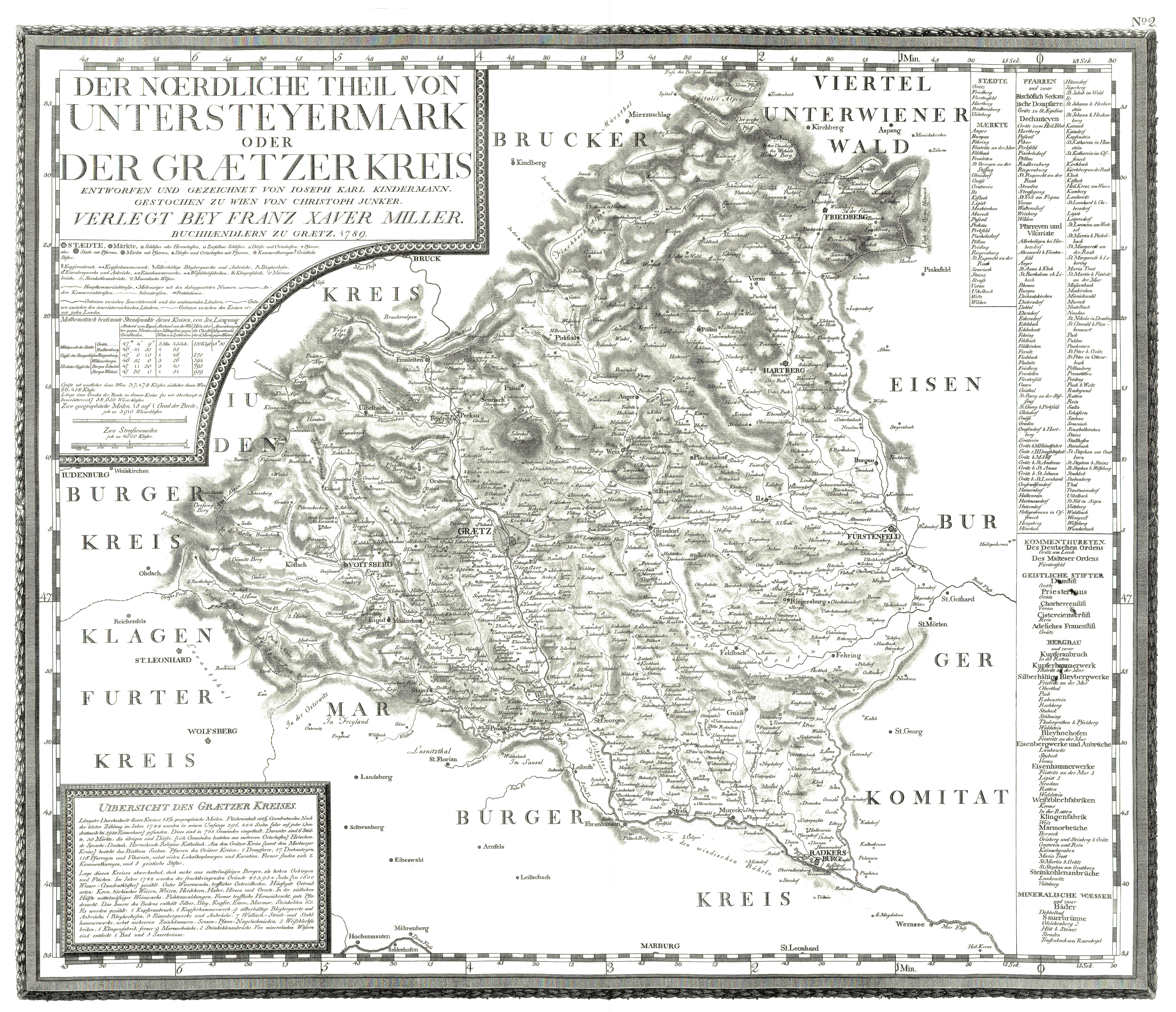
In the 18th century the East Styrian Hills belonged to the county of Graz and was part of the Lower Styria

Most of the valleys in the entire region run southwards to southeastwards, which gives the orography its typical divisions. The region is drained by the Mur as well as the waters of the Raab and Feistritz, and the valley of the Lafnitz forms the boundary.

== Literature ==
- Peter Krenn: Die Oststeiermark. Ihre Kunstwerke, Historischen Lebens- und Siedlungsformen. Erweiterte Neuauflage, Reihe Styria regional, Verlag Styria, Graz, 1997, ISBN 3-222-12601-1.
