= Feistritz Saddle =

Mountain pass in the Austrian Alps

Feistritz Saddle Feistritzsattel
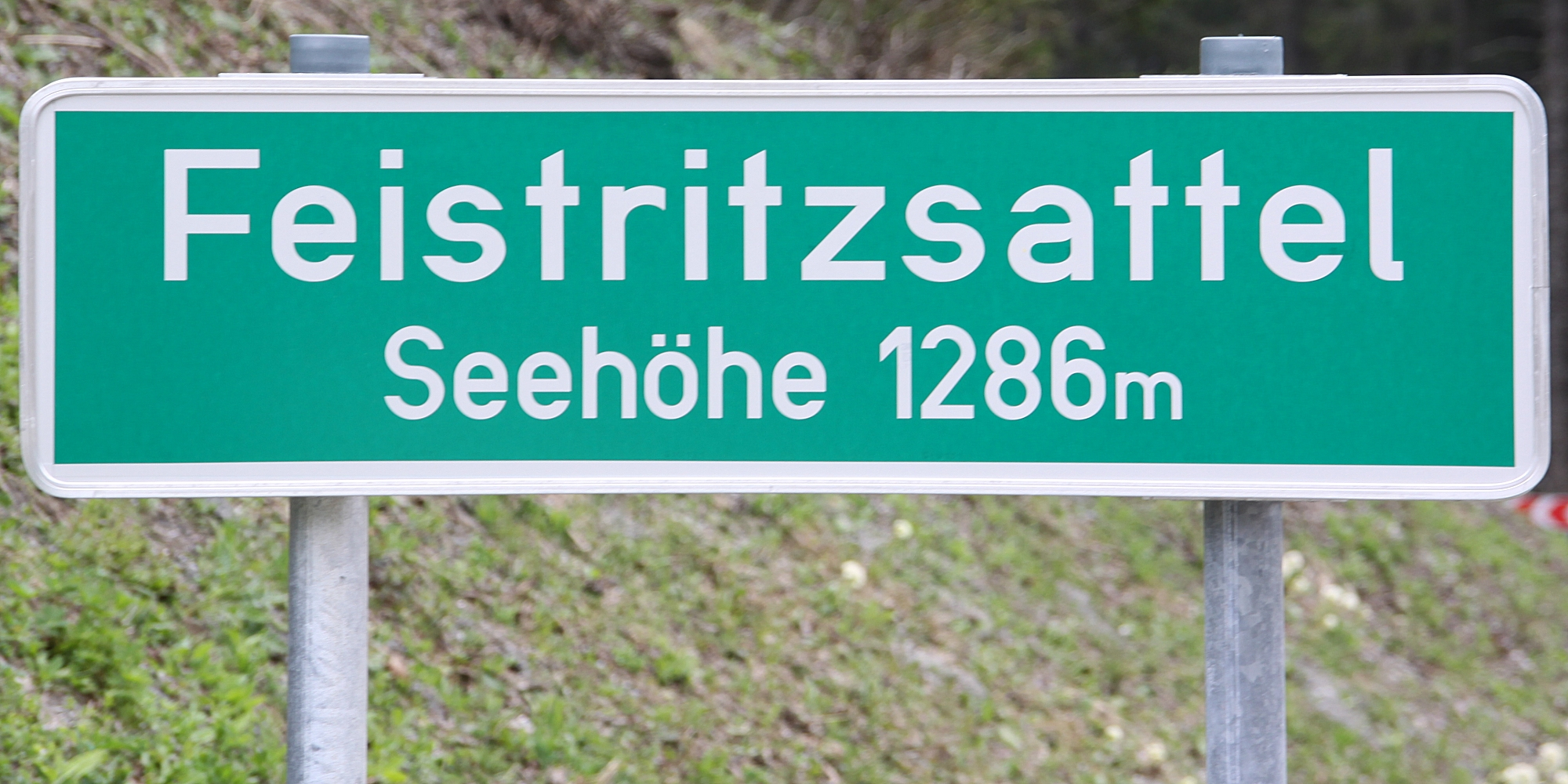
- Summit of the pass

- Location within Alps
- Elevation: 1,286 m (4,219 ft)
- Traversed by: L407

Third Approach
- Location: Austria
- Range: Alps
- Coordinates: 47°34′3″N 15°51′55″E

The Feistritz Saddle (German: Feistritzsattel, elevation 1,287 m [4,222 ft]) is a high mountain pass in the Austrian Alps between the Bundesländer of Lower Austria and Styria.

The pass leads between the Wechsel (1,743 m [5,719 ft]) and the Stuhleck (1,784 m [5,853 ft]).

With the Semmering, it is one of the most important links between Lower Austria and Styria.

Many hiking trails in the area make it a destination for hikers, particularly to the nearby Sonnwendstein.

In winter, the area is a popular cross-country skiing venue.
