= Fischbach, Styria =

Fischbach
- Municipality
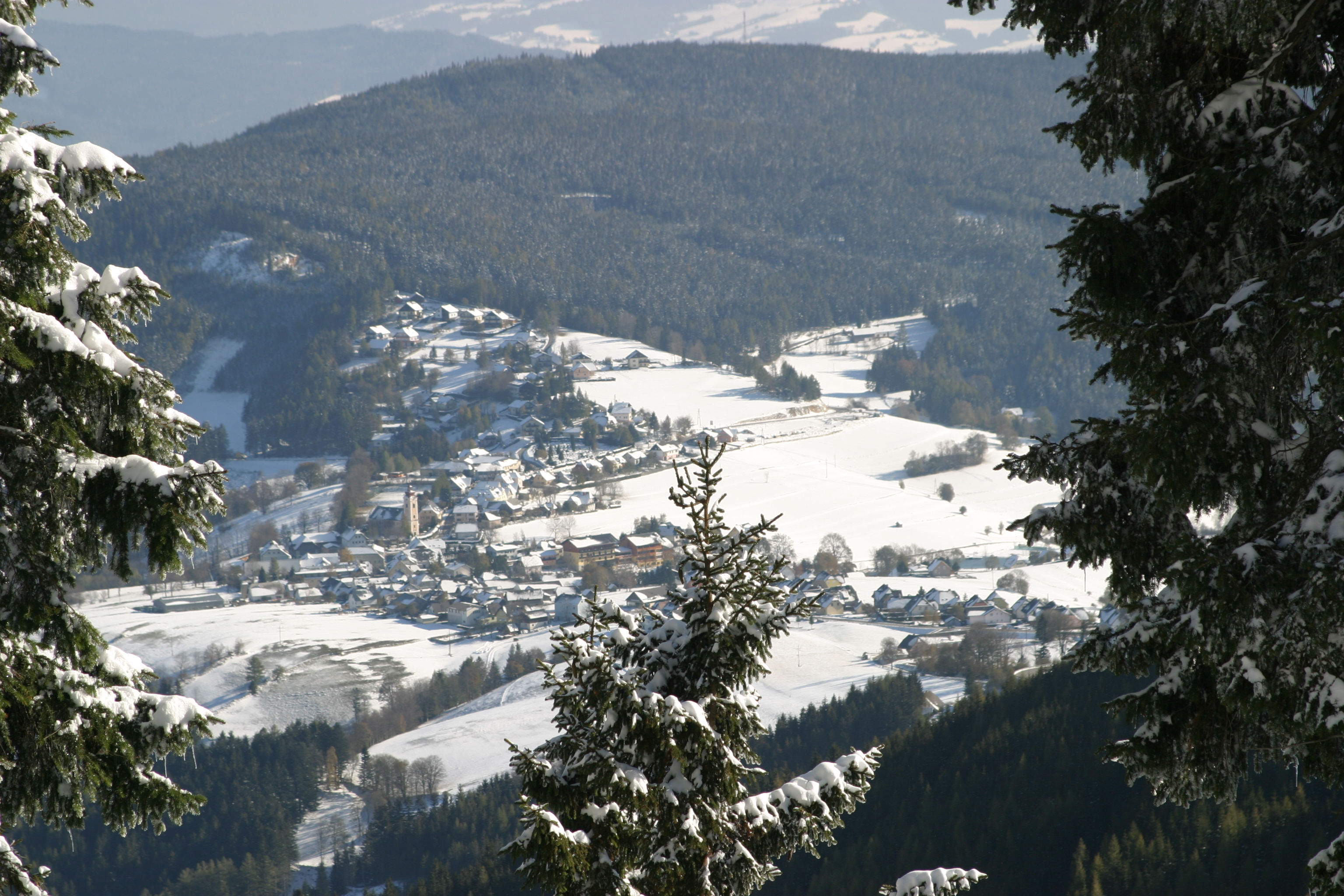

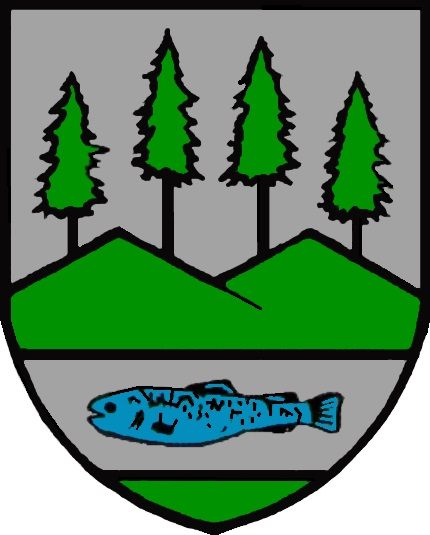
- Coat of arms

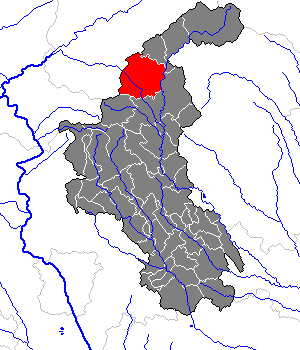
- Location within Weiz district

- Location within Austria
- Coordinates: 47°26′31″N 15°39′02″E
- Country: Austria
- State: Styria
- District: Weiz

Government
  - Mayor: Silvia Karelly (ÖVP) (ÖVP)

Area
  - Total: 61.7 km^{2} (23.8 sq mi)
- Elevation: 1,050 m (3,440 ft)

Population (2018-01-01)
  - Total: 1,528
  - Density: 24.8/km^{2} (64.1/sq mi)
- Time zone: UTC+1 (CET)
  - Summer (DST): UTC+2 (CEST)
- Postal code: 8654
- Area code: 03170
- Vehicle registration: WZ
- Website: www.fischbach.co.at

Fischbach (German pronunciation: [ˈfɪʃˌbax]) is a municipality in the district of Weiz in Styria, Austria. It has 1530 inhabitants (as of January 1, 2021). On 27 February 2003, it was officially recognized as a climatic spa (Luftkurort) by the Styrian government. Fischbach is the highest place in East Styria.

== Geography ==
Fischbach is a town in the Fischbacher Alpen and is located about 12 km (7.5 mi) northwest of Birkfeld and about 27 km (17 mi) air-line distance from the district capital Weiz. The maximum north-south extension as well as the maximum east-west extension are each about nine kilometers (5.6 mi). The municipality covers an area of 61.70 km^{2} (23.82 sq mi). At 1,498 m (4,915 ft), the Teufelstein (Fischbach Alps) is the highest elevation in the municipality. The lowest point in the municipality is in the valley of the river Feistritz (Feistritztal) at 650 m (2,130 ft).

The Feistritz forms part of the eastern border and the Fischbach forest prevents a view from the town center down into the valley. In the south, the Hinterleiten forest is cut through by the Waisenbach. In the west runs the ridge of the Fischbach Alps, over which the saddle "Auf der Schanz" leads.
