= Ameringkogel =

Mountain in Styria, Austria

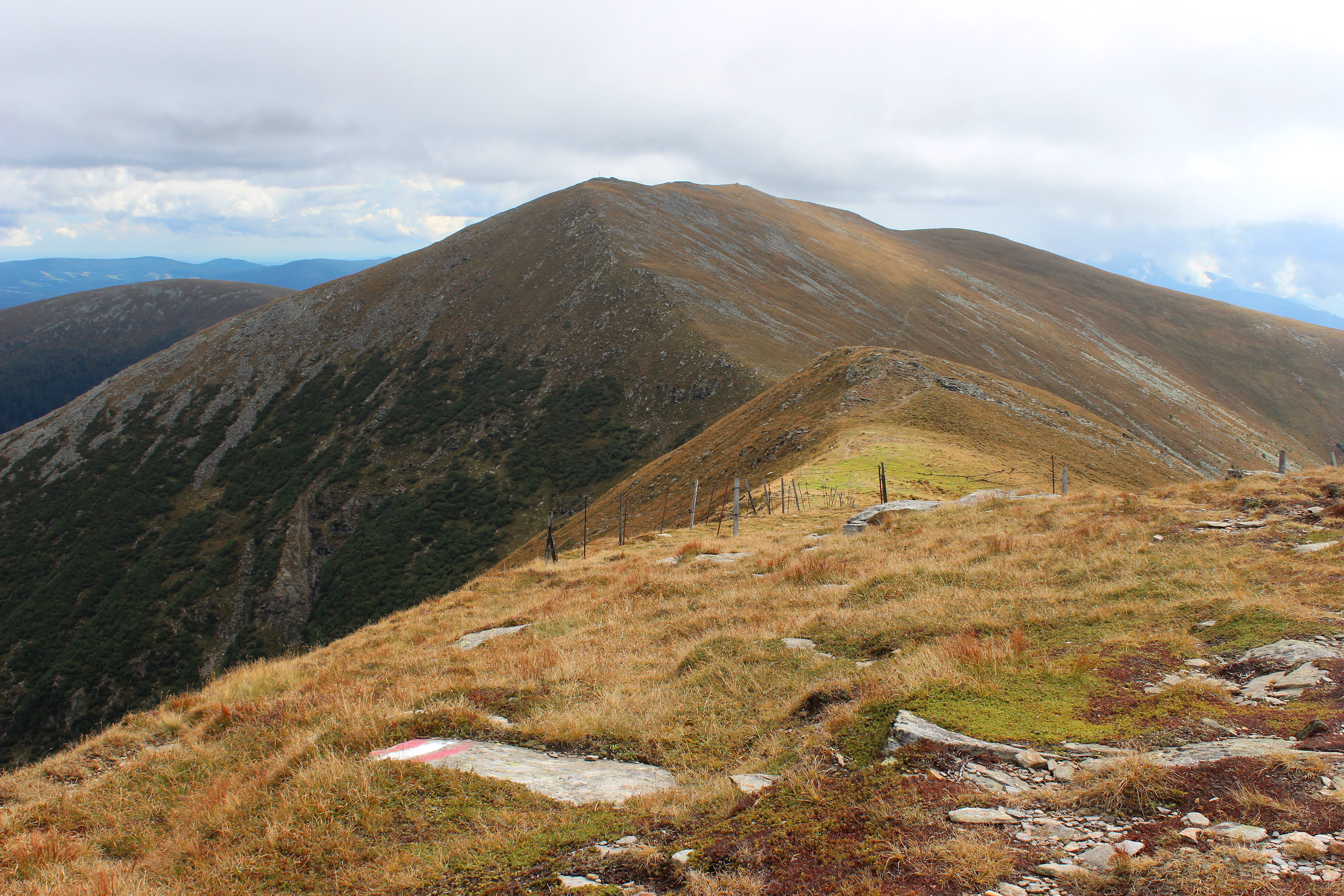

Highest point
- Elevation: 2,187 m (7,175 ft)
- Prominence: 1,232 m (4,042 ft)
- Listing: Prominent mountains of the Alps
- Coordinates: 47°04′16″N 14°48′30″E

Geography
- Location within Austria
- Location: Styria, Austria
- Parent range: Styrian Prealps

Ameringkogel is a mountain in the Alps located in Austria. It is the highest peak of the Styrian Prealps.

== Geography ==
Administratively the mountain belongs the Austrian state of Styria.
