= Pfaffen Saddle =

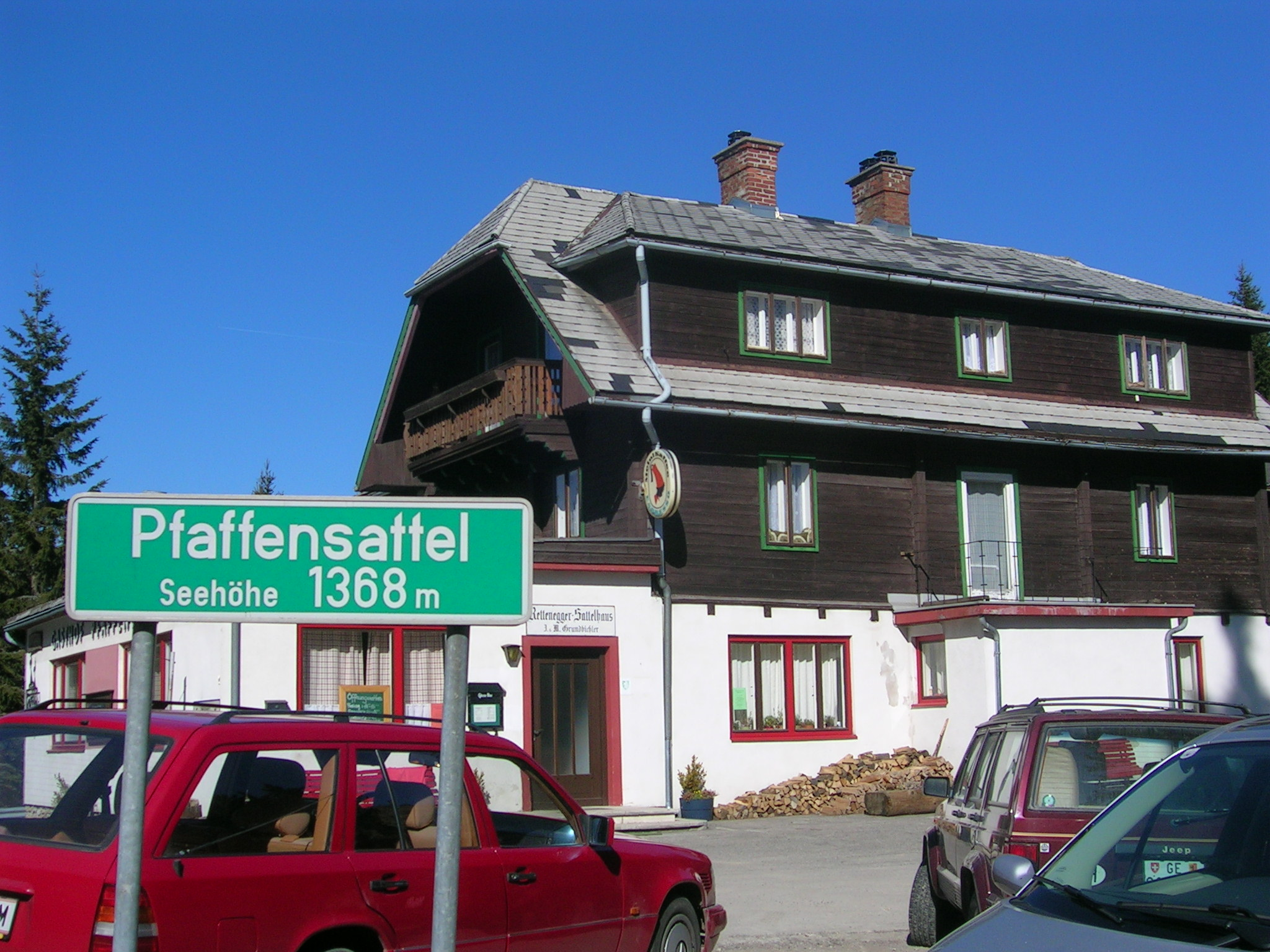
- Summit of the pass

- Location within Alps
- Elevation: 1,372 m (4,501 ft)

Location
- Location: Austria
- Range: Alps
- Coordinates: 47°34′N 15°48′E

The Pfaffen Saddle (German: Pfaffensattel) (el. 1,372 m.) is a high mountain pass in the Austrian Alps in the Bundesland of Styria.

It connects Rettenegg and Steinhaus am Semmering.

== See also ==
- List of highest paved roads in Europe
- List of mountain passes
