= Graz Highlands =

Graz Highlands Grazer Bergland
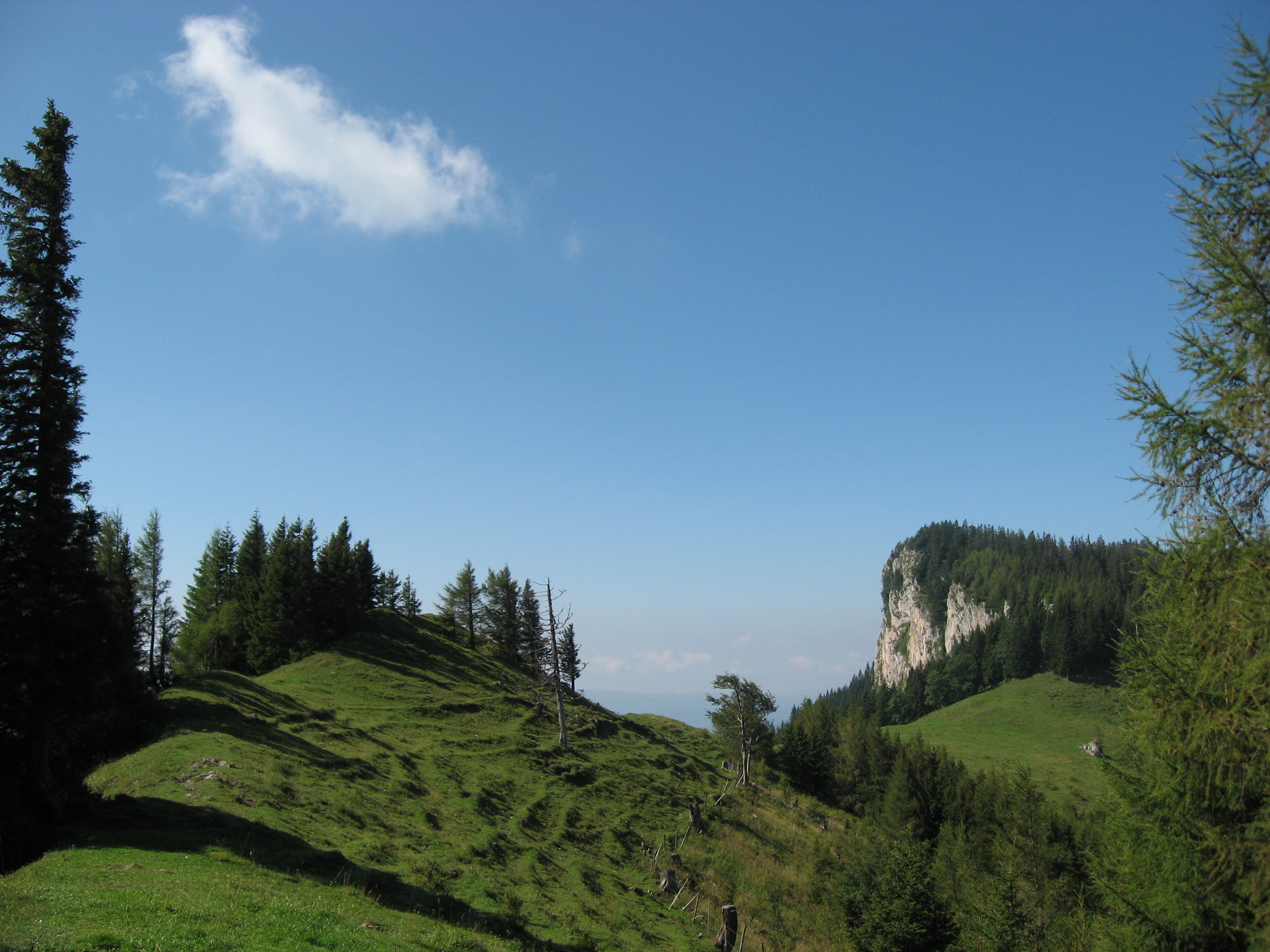
- Characteristic landscape of alms and crags: view from the Tyrnauer Alm to the Rote Wand

Highest point
- Peak: Hochlantsch
- Elevation: 1,720 m above sea level (AA)

Dimensions
- Length: 30 km (19 mi)

Geography
- Location within Austria
- State(s): Styria, Austria
- Range coordinates: 47°21′46″N 15°25′27″E
- Parent range: Prealps East of the Mur, Lavanttal Alps, Central Alps, Alps

Geology
- Orogeny: Mittelgebirge
- Rock age: Silurian to Carboniferous
- Rock type(s): limestones, dolomite, slate

The Graz Highlands or Graz Mountains (German: Grazer Bergland) are a low mountain range north of the Styrian state capital of Graz in Austria. It is part of the Central Alps and forms the start of the Prealps East of the Mur. From a geological perspective, regions on the west bank of the Mur, which are clearly separate from the building of the Styrian Prealps, belong to the Graz Highlands.

== Location ==
The Graz Highlands are a low mountain massif in the north of the Styrian Hills and lie mainly east of the River Mur.

The core area of settlement is the Passail Basin, the adjacent Semriach Basin to the southwest and the Teichalm region to the north.

=== Boundaries ===
The Graz Highlands are bounded:

- in the west by the Mur valley from Mixnitz to the northern city limits of Graz. By geological definition certain parts west of the Mur are also counted as part of the Graz Highlands, especially those which belong to the Graz Palaezoic, such as the Plabutsch Buchkogelzug
- in the north by the Breitenauertal (valley containing Breitenau am Hochlantsch) and the valley of the Gasenbach. Other definitions view it as the line from Mixnitzbach via Teichalm to Gasen
- in the northeast by the upper Feistritz valley

In the south and southeast the Graz Highlands transition into the East Styrian Hills and Graz Basin.

=== Mountains ===
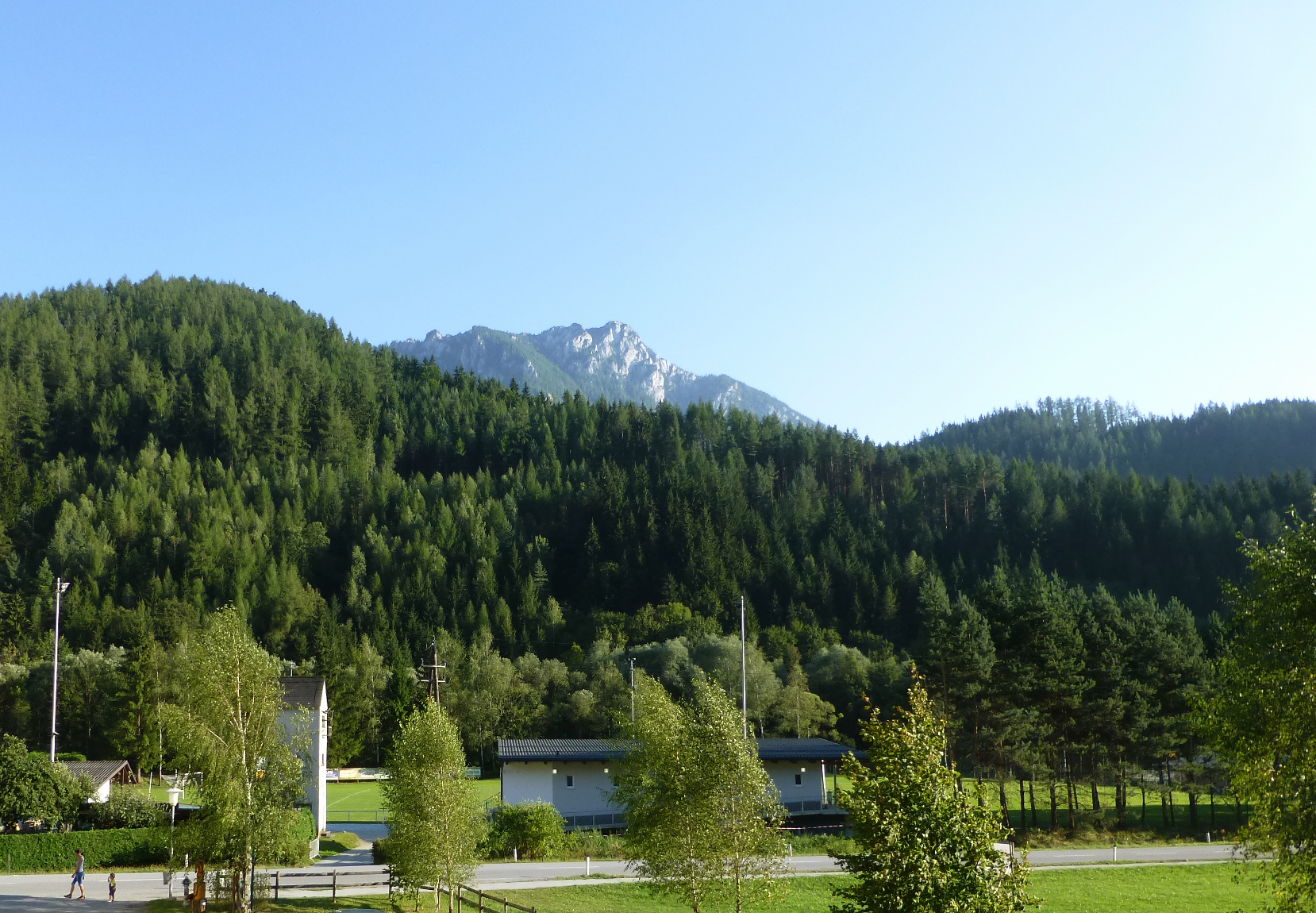
The north face of the Hochlantsch seen from Breitenau

The most important summits are the:

- Hochlantsch (1,720 m)
- Osser (1,548 m)
- Rote Wand (1,505 m)
- Schöckl (1,445 m)
- Zetz (1,274 m)
- Röthelstein (1,263 m)
- Hochtrötsch (1,239 m)
- Schiffall (1,221 m) and Kreuzkogel (1,181 m)
- Pleschkogel (1,061 m)
- Hohe Rannach (1,018 m)
- Generalkogel (713 m)
- Eggenberg (707 m)

== Gallery ==
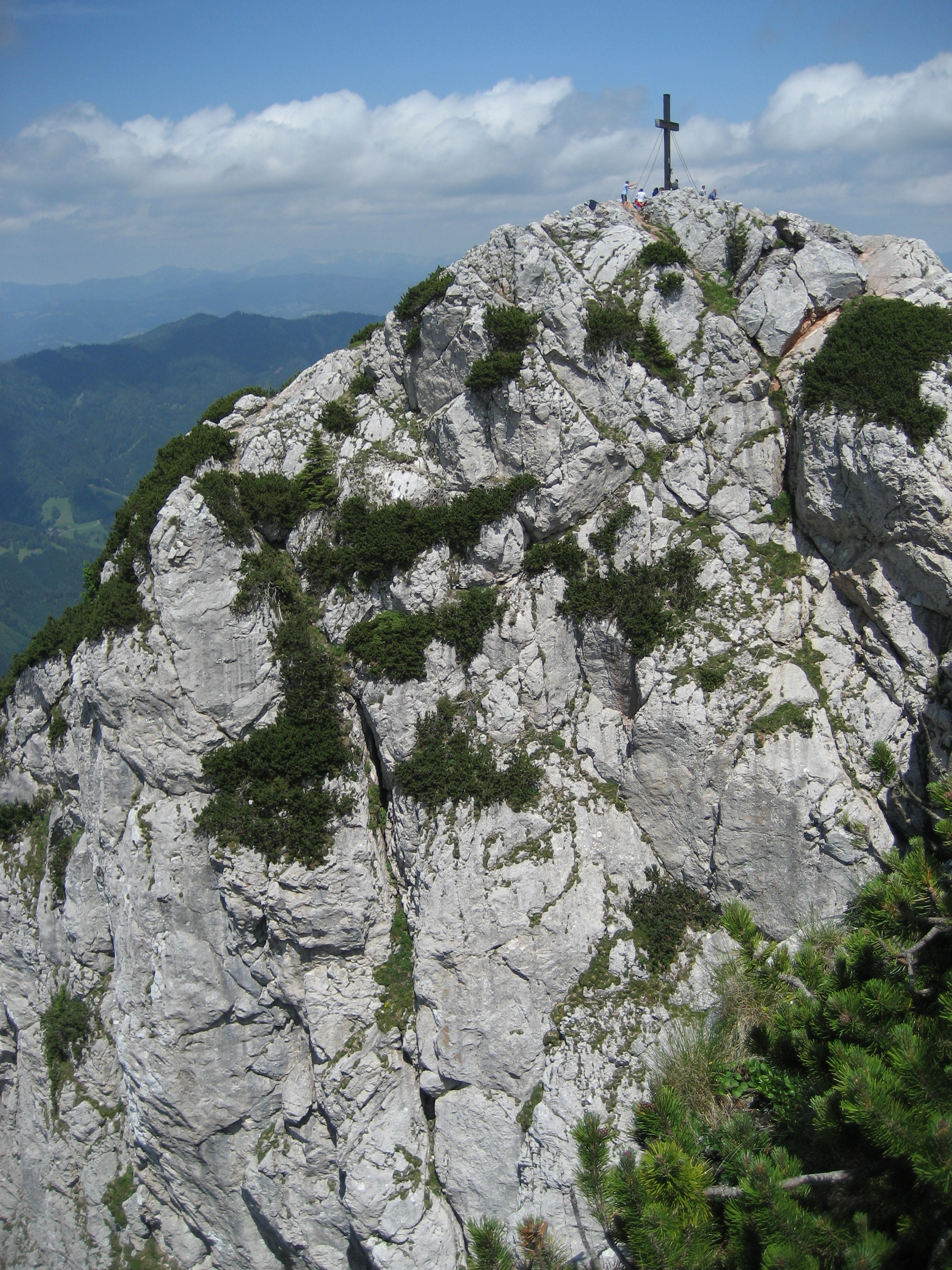
Summit of the Hochlantsch

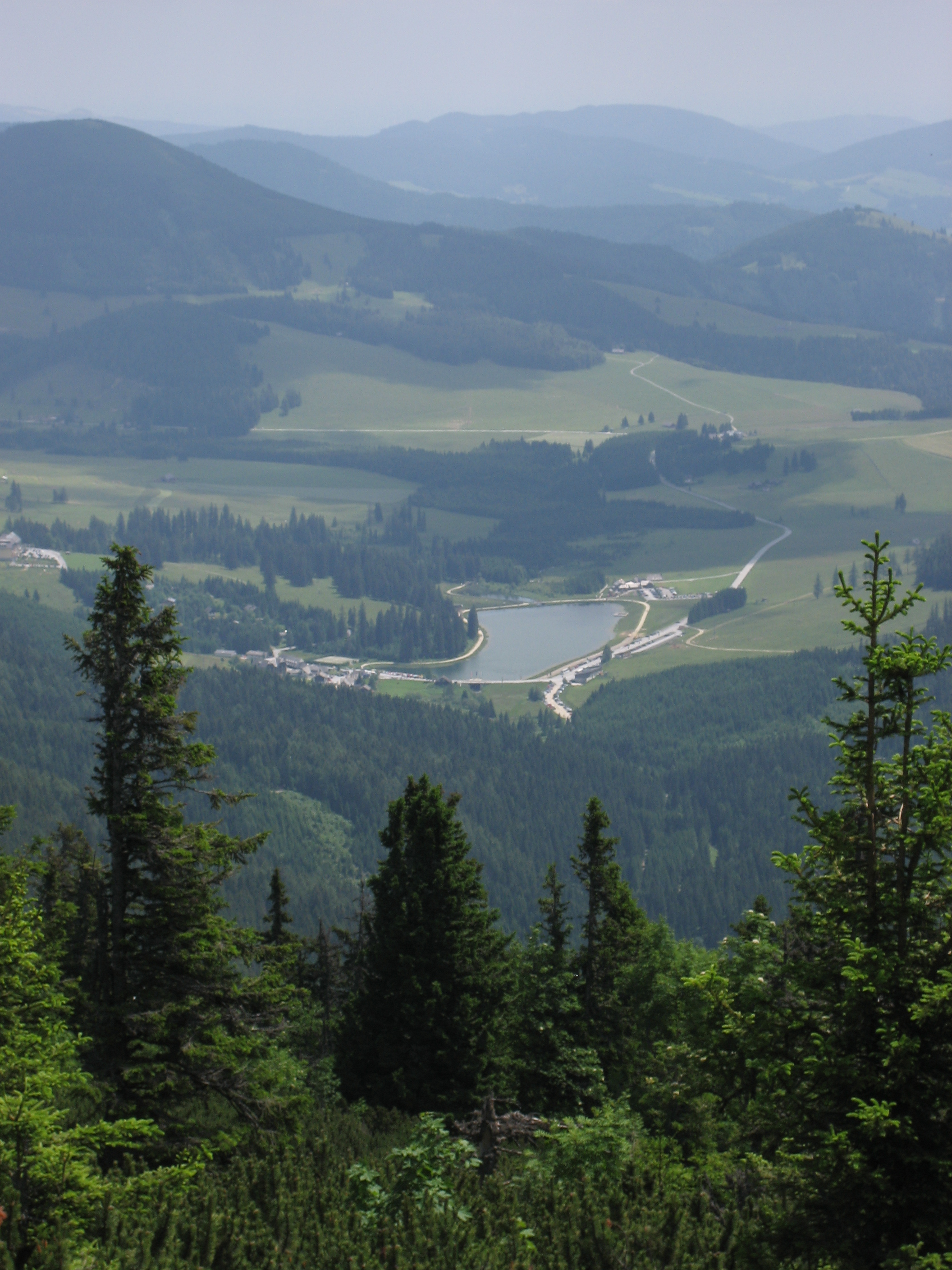
Teichalm region

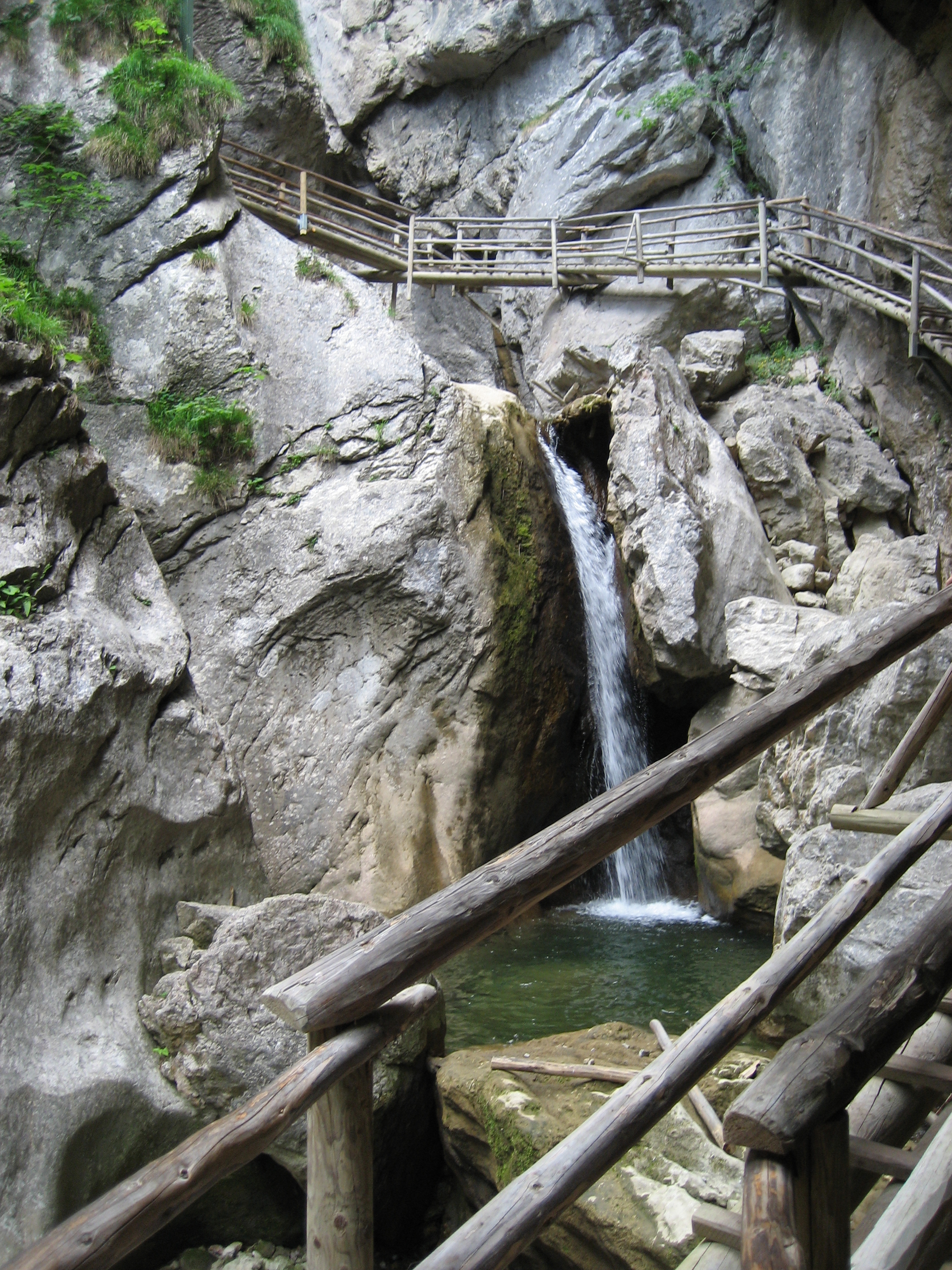
Ascent through the Bärenschützklamm gorge

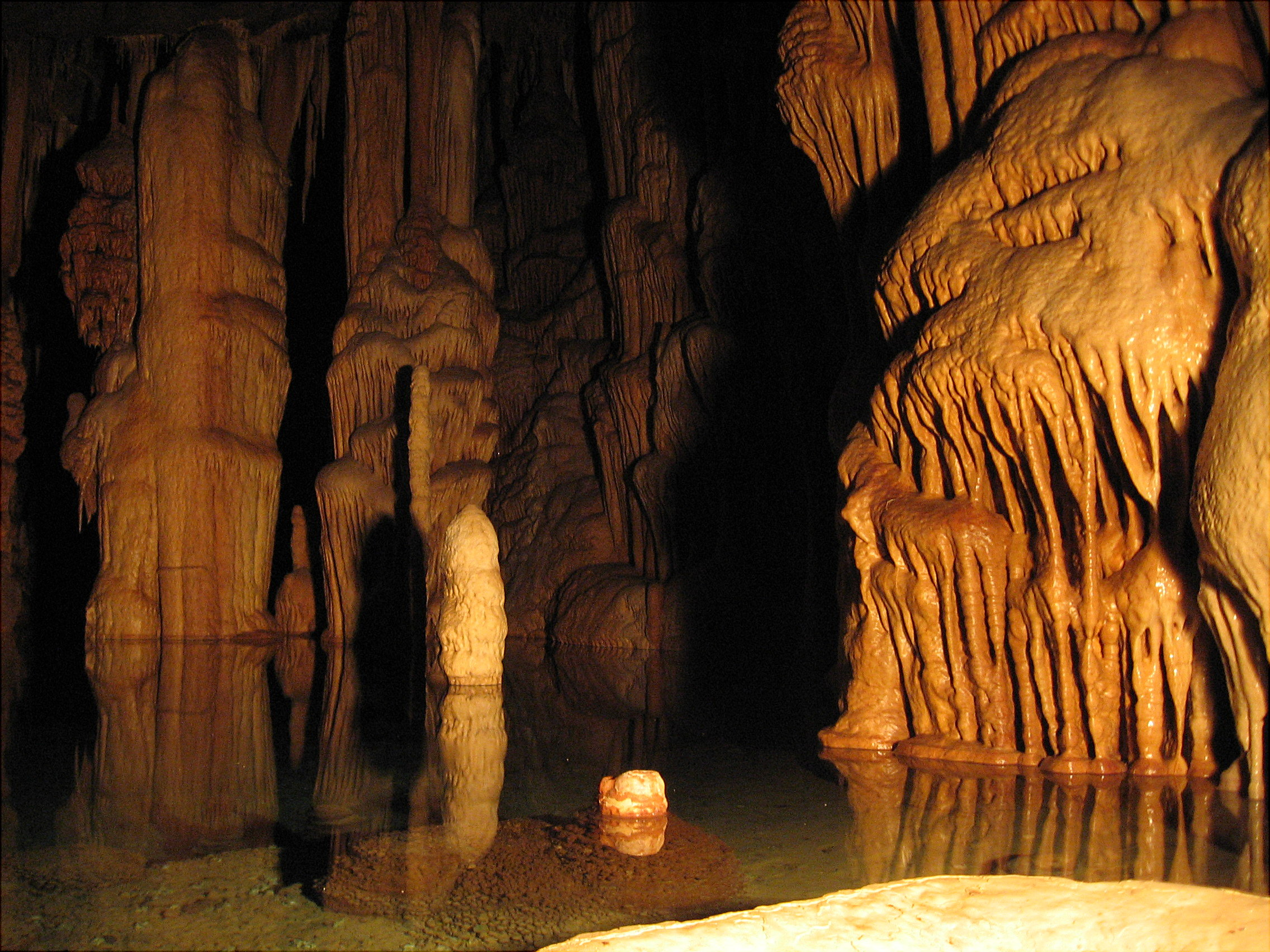
Katerloch

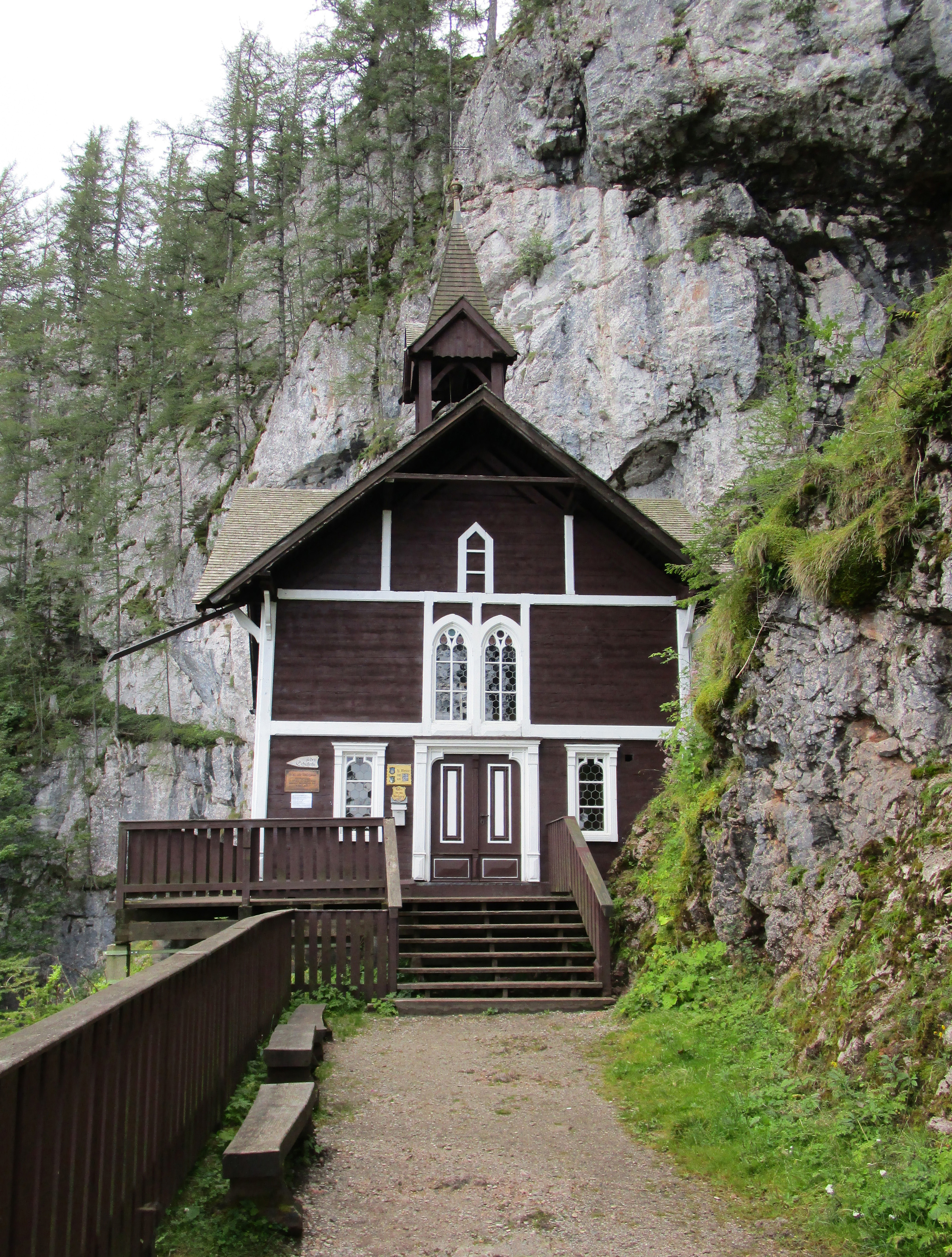
Schüsserlbrunn pilgrimage church

== Literature ==
- Helmut Flügel: Die Geologie des Grazer Berglandes. 2nd edn., Graz, 1975, = Mitteilungen der Abteilung für Geologie, Paläontologie und Bergbau am Landesmuseum Joanneum, Sonderheft 1 (1. Aufl. Erläuterungen zur Geologischen Wanderkarte des Grazer Berglandes 1 : 100,000. hsg. Geologische Bundesanstalt, Vienna, 1960; pdf, at museum-joanneum.at).
