= Hochlantsch =

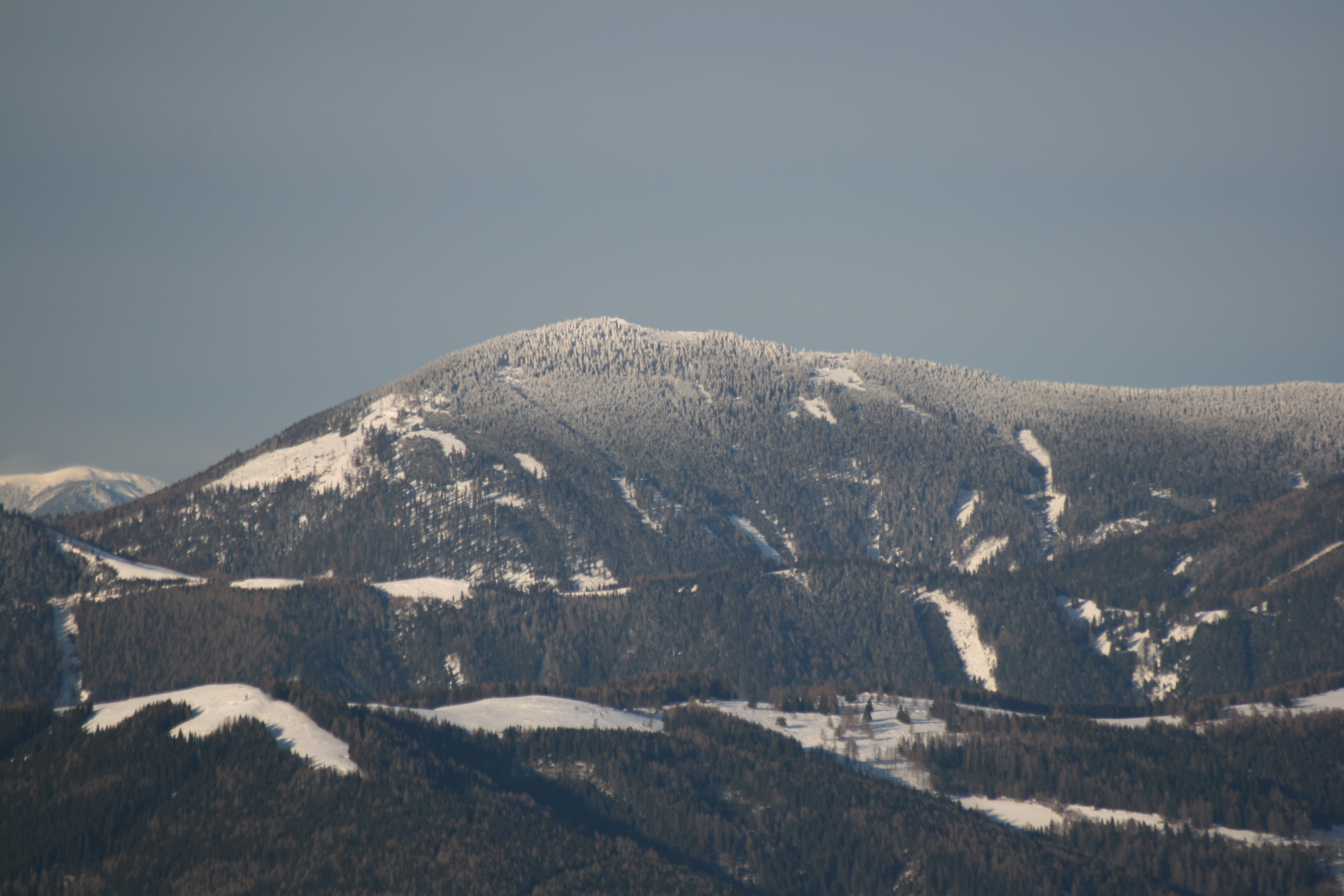
- View of the Hochlantsch from Schöckl

Highest point
- Elevation: 1,720 m (AA) (5,640 ft)
- Prominence: 1,720-1,081 m ↓ Alpl
- Isolation: 26.3 km → Eiblkogel
- Coordinates: 47°21′46″N 15°25′27″E

Geography
- Location within Austria
- Location: Styria, Austria
- Parent range: Graz Highlands, Prealps East of the Mur

Geology
- Rock age: Palaeozoic
- Rock type(s): Hochlantsch limestone, Größkogelkalk

The Hochlantsch (1,720 m (AA)) is the highest mountain in the Graz Highlands, a subgroup of the Prealps East of the Mur according to the Alpine Club classification of the Eastern Alps. To the north the mountain drops steeply into the Lantschmauern. The Hochlantsch is a popular destination for those living in the Graz area due to its good views and easy access.

The easiest ascent takes about two hours and starts at the Teichalm. One can either start at the Teichwirt or a few metres on at where the Teichalm Lift. Another variant from Mixnitz runs through the watery Bärenschütz Gorge. From the pub of Zirbisegger (accessible from Breitenau by car) the Friends of Nature Klettersteig (Naturfreunde-Klettersteig) runs up the rocky northern flank to the top. Nearby are the inn of zum Steirischen Jokl and the little pilgrimage church of Schüsserlbrunn.

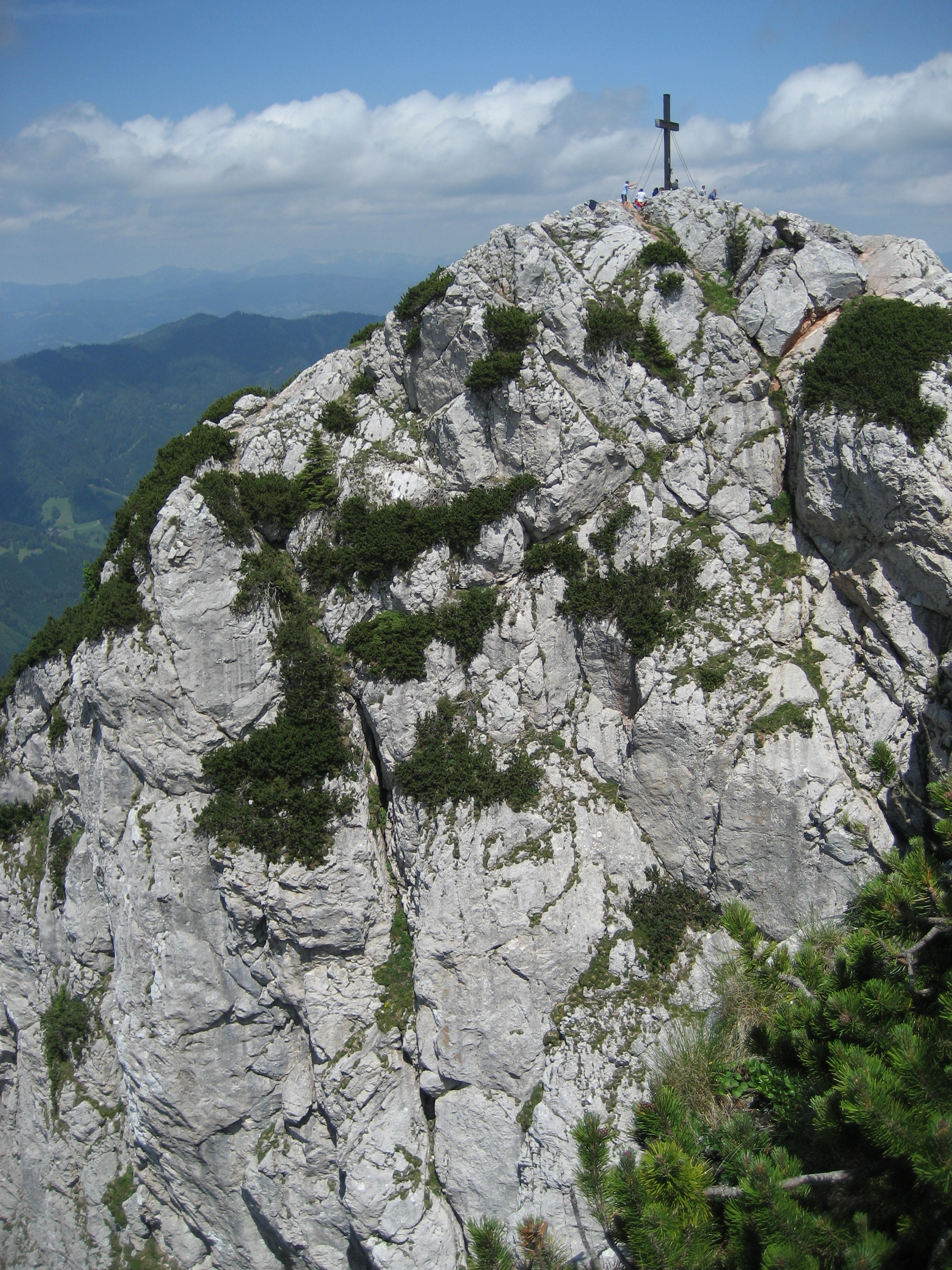
Hochlantsch summit cross

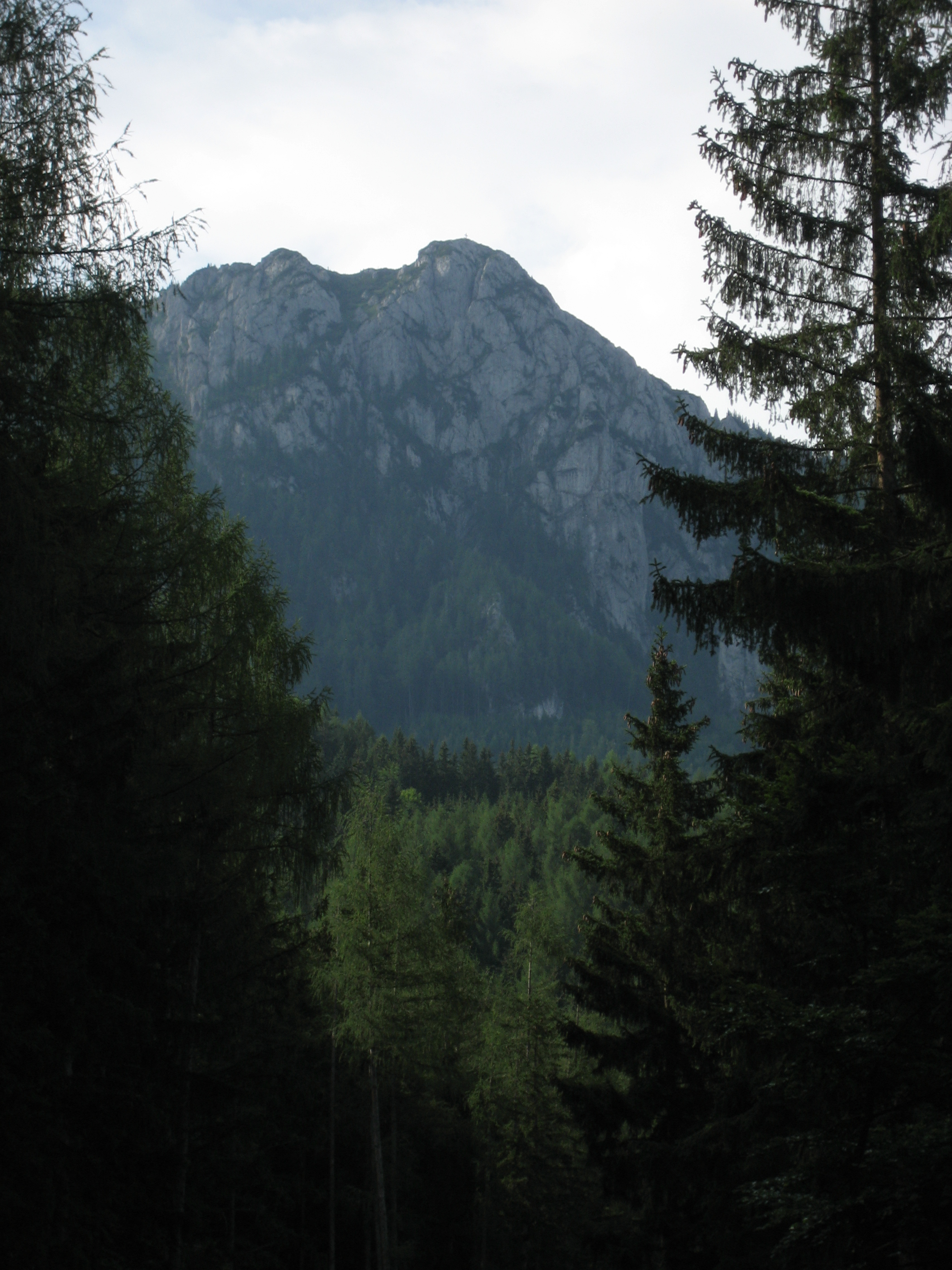
From the north

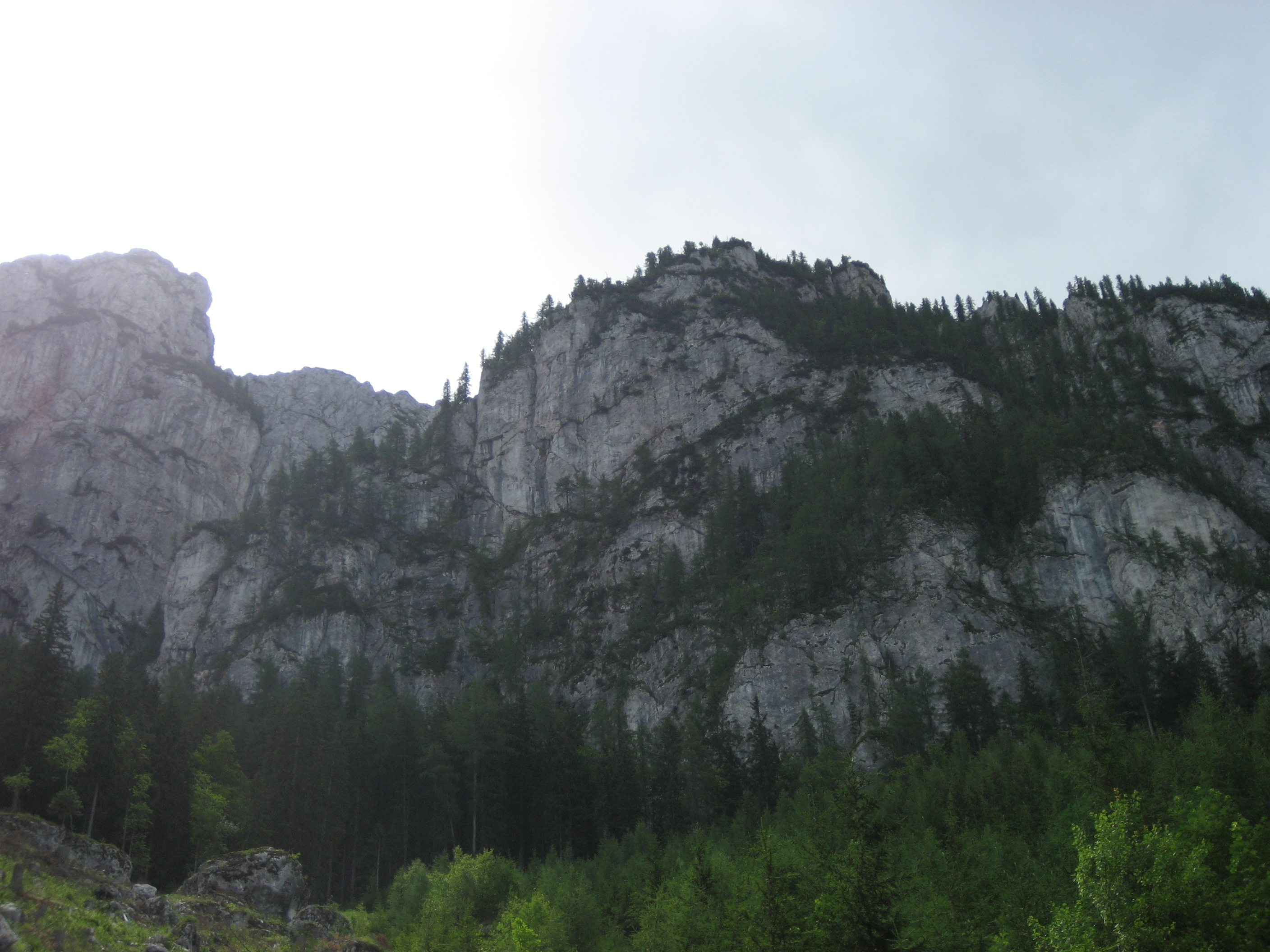
North face

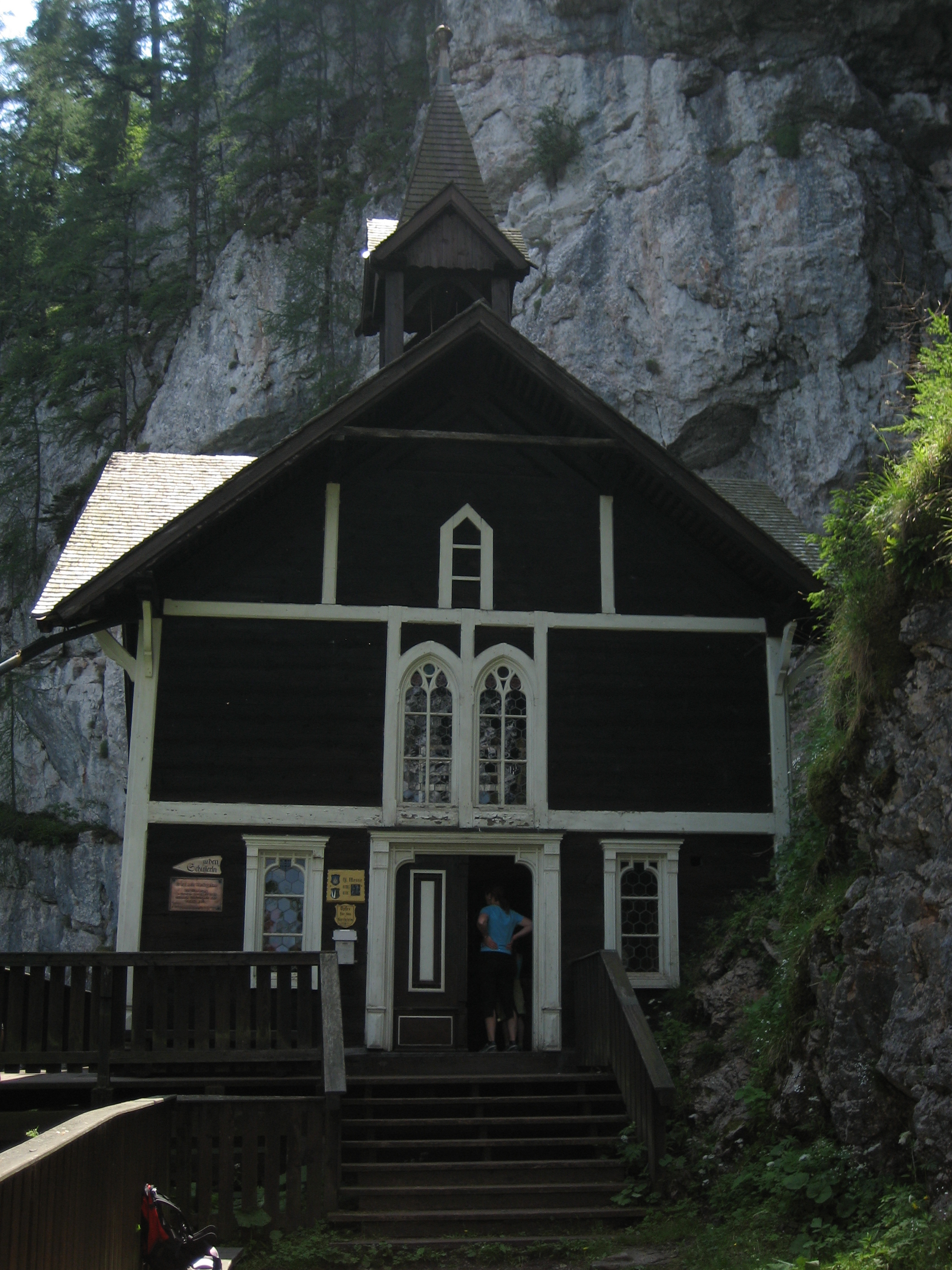
Schüsserlbrunn Pilgrimage Church
