= Stuhleck =

Mountain in Steiermark, Austria

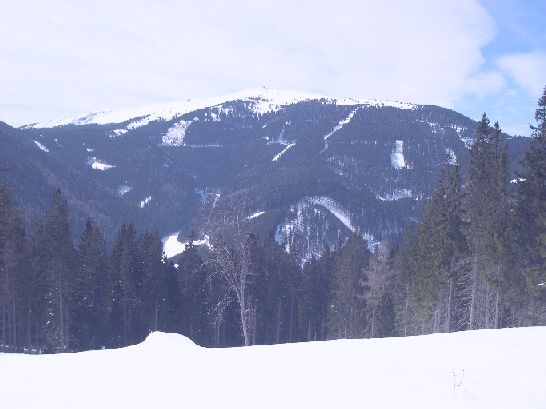
- Stuhleck

Highest point
- Elevation: 1,782 m (5,846 ft)
- Prominence: 798 m (2,618 ft)
- Coordinates: 47°34′N 15°47′E

Geography
- Location within Austria
- Location: Steiermark, Austria
- Parent range: Prealps East of the Mur

Stuhleck (1,782 m) is a mountain in Steiermark, Austria. It is the highest mountain of the Fischbach Alps and of the Prealps east of the Mur.

Lying in the sparsely populated commune of Spital am Semmering, Stuhleck is a grassy mountain with gentle slopes, although its lower slopes are heavily wooded. With the summit being above the treeline, it offers fine views of some of the higher alpine ranges to the west, and it is a fairly easy hike to the top.
