= Prealps East of the Mur =

Mountain range in Austria

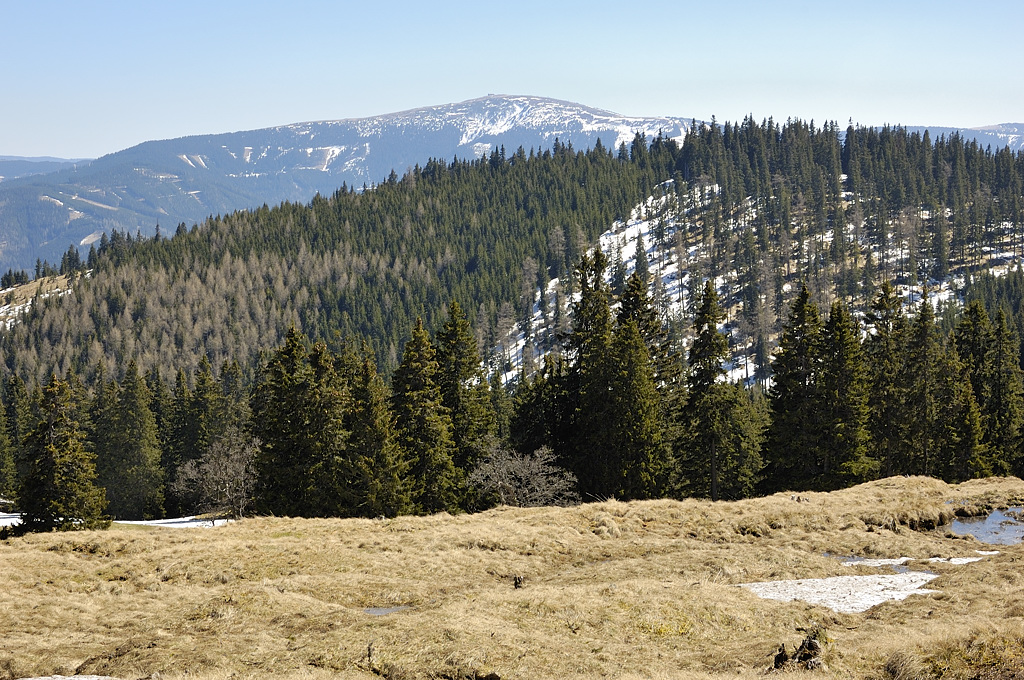
- Kampalpe and Stuhleck, the highest mountain of the Prealps.

Highest point
- Peak: Stuhleck
- Elevation: 1,783 m (5,850 ft)
- Coordinates: 47°34′27″N 15°47′24″E

Dimensions
- Length: 140 km (87 mi)

Geography
- Location within Alps
- State(s): Styria, Lower Austria
- Range coordinates: 47°35′N 15°48′E
- Parent range: Central Eastern Alps

The Prealps East of the Mur (German: Randgebirge östlich der Mur) are the easternmost mountain range of the Central Eastern Alps. They comprise the eastern foothills of the Alpine crest beyond the Mur river and the adjacent southeastern Alpine Foreland.

== Boundary and neighbouring ranges ==
According to the Alpine Club classification of the Eastern Alps (AVE), the boundaries of the Prealps East of the Mur are as follows:

- The border with the Northern Limestone Alps runs from the Vienna Woods in the northeast along the edge of the Gutenstein Alps, following the line from the Steinfeld basin via Neunkirchen to Ternitz. It continues along the southeastern edge of the Rax-Schneeberg Group, from Ternitz to Gloggnitz, Schottwien and over the Semmering Pass to Mürzzuschlag in the Mürz valley. From here, the border runs along the edge of the Mürzsteg Alps up to Bruck an der Mur in the west.
- The western border runs along the edge of the Lavanttal Alps, separated by the River Mur from Bruck an der Mur via Graz as far as Spielfeld in the south.
- The southeastern boundary is vague, but roughly runs along the Hungarian Plain and Neusiedler See via Bruck an der Leitha to the Vienna Basin.

== Subdivisions ==
The range is generally subdivided into the following regions:

- Fischbach Alps (Stuhleck 1,783 m (AA))
- Wechsel (Hochwechsel 1,743 m above sea level (AA))
- Graz Highlands (Hochlantsch 1,720 m above sea level (AA))

In addition it includes the following eastern and southeastern foothills of the Alps:

- Leitha Mountains (Sonnenberg 484 m above sea level (AA))
- Rosalia Mountains (Heuberg 748 m above sea level (AA))
- Sopron or Ödenburg Mountains (Brentenriegel 606 m above sea level (AA))
- Bucklige Welt (Eselberg 974 m above sea level (AA))
- Joglland (Hochwechsel 1,743 m above sea level (AA))
- Kőszeg or Güns Mountains (Geschriebenstein 884 m above sea level (AA))
