= Tertiary Hill Country =

Upland area in northern Alpine Foreland

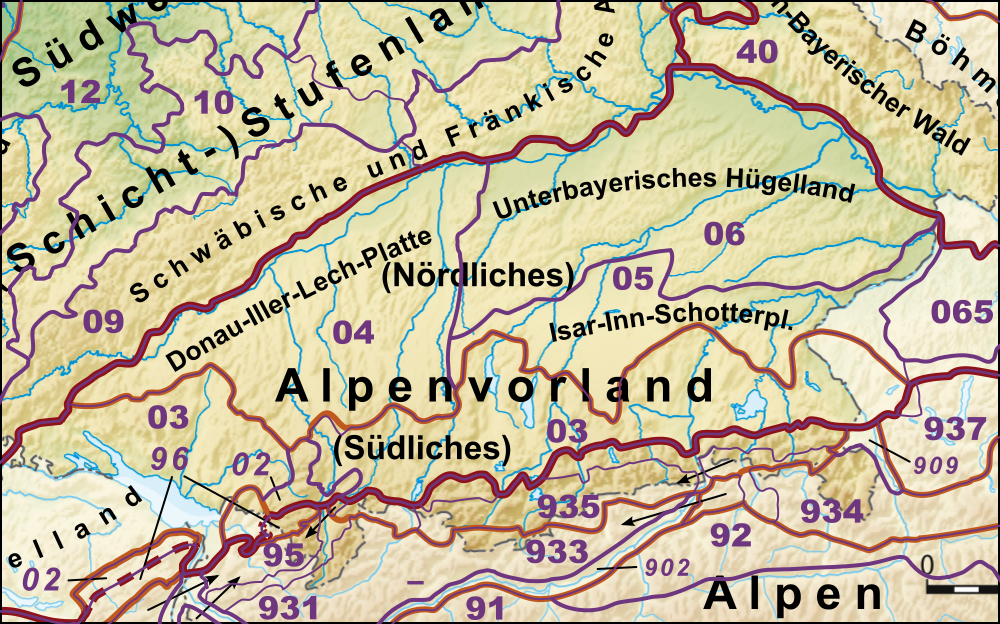
The Tertiary Hill Country and the Lower Bavarian Hills (06) and the Hausruckviertl Mountain and Hill Country (065, far right)

The Tertiary Hill Country (German: Tertiärhügelland or Tertiäres Hügelland), also called the Tertiary Hills, is an upland area with a moderate climate in the northern Alpine Foreland, which extends northwards as far as the River Danube. It is divided into two simple contiguous regions that are separated by the valley of the Lower Inn which itself is not usually counted as part of the Tertiary Hills. In Germany (Bavaria), the Lower Bavarian Upland is its larger northwestern element; in Upper Austria it forms the Hausruckviertl Mountain and Hill Country (also called the Upper Austrian Hill Country or Oberösterreichisches Hügelland). From a natural regional perspective, depending on the definition, it forms one or two 3rd level natural regions.

The Tertiary Hill Country is bordered to the west, south and southeast by old moraine gravel plateaux, that also form 3rd order major regions in the northern Alpine Foreland:

- the Iller-Lech Plateau to the west
- the Isar-Inn gravel plateaux in the western south
- the Traun-Danube-Enns gravel plateaux in the eastern south and to the east.
