= Interfluve =

Area of higher ground between two rivers in the same drainage system

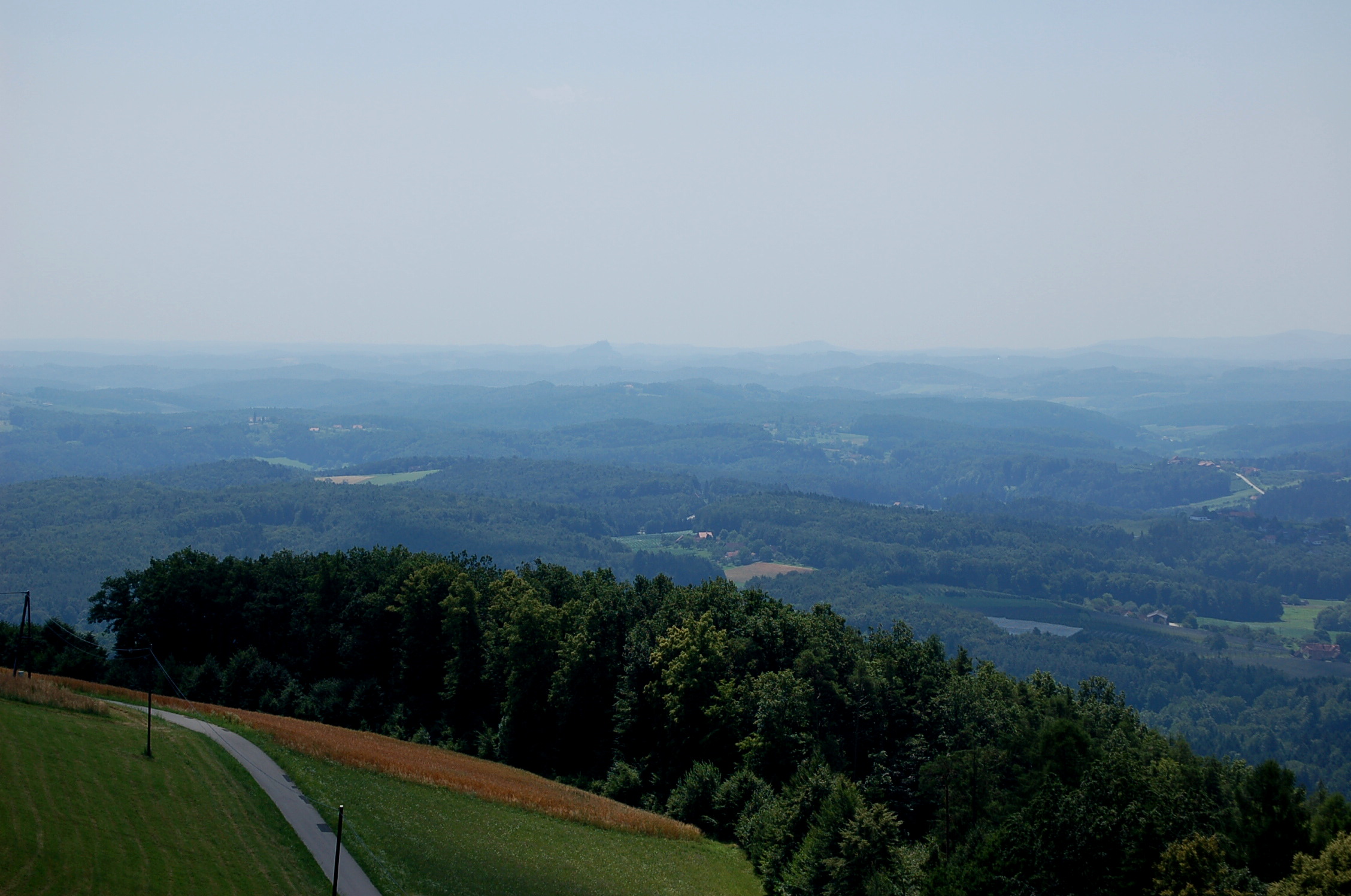
The East Styrian Hills south of Herberstein

An interfluve is a narrow, elongated and plateau-like or ridge-like landform between two valleys. More generally, an interfluve is defined as an area of higher ground between two rivers in the same drainage system.

== Formation ==
These landforms are created by earth flow ("solifluction"). They can also be former river terraces that are subsequently bisected by fluvial erosion. In cases where there is a deposit of younger sedimentary beds (loess, colluvium) the interfluves have a rounder and less rugged appearance. A consequence of interfluve formation is the so-called "interfluvial landscape."

== Interfluvial landscapes ==
- In South Burgenland and in the East Styrian Hills of Austria
- the majority of the natural region of the Iller-Lech Plateau in Bavarian Swabia and Upper Swabia (Baden-Württemberg) with the exception of the major river valleys of the Danube, Iller and Lech, the Donauried and the Federseeried as well as the Old Drift landscapes south of the natural region.
- Danube–Tisza Interfluve
- Volga-Ural interfluve

== See also ==
- Doab
- Interamnia (disambiguation)
