= Würm glaciation =

Last glacial period in the Alpine region

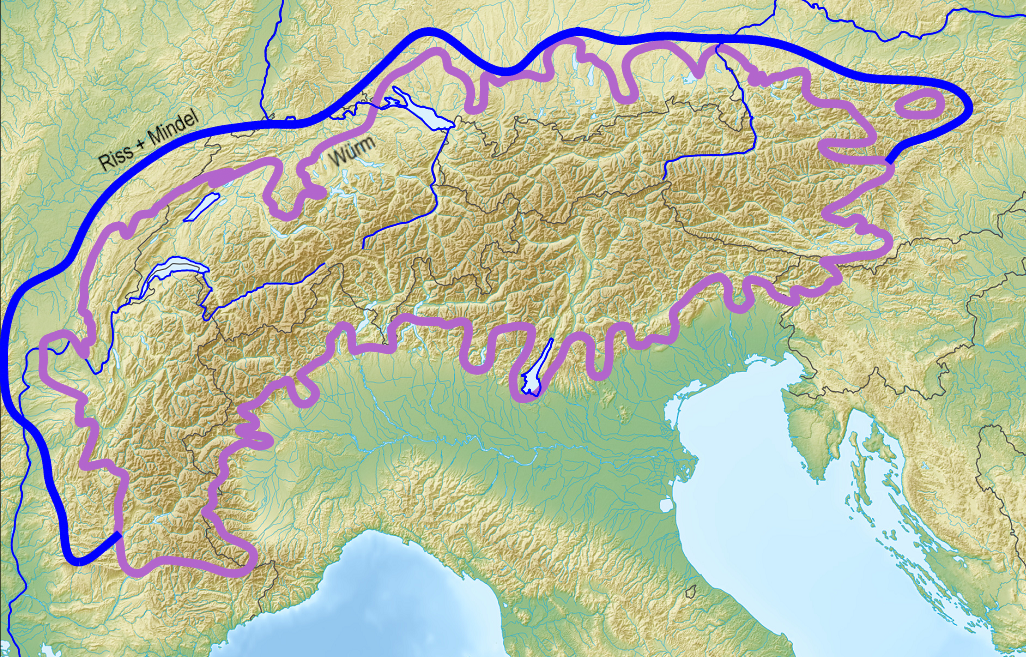
Extent of the Alpine ice sheet in the Würm glaciation Extent in earlier glaciations

The Würm glaciation, or Würm stage (German: Würm-Kaltzeit or Würm-Glazial, also Würmeiszeit or Würmzeit; cf. ice age), commonly referred as the Würm (often spelled Wurm), was the last glacial period in the Alpine region. It is the youngest of the major glaciations of the region that extended beyond the Alps themselves. Like most of the other ice ages of the Pleistocene epoch, it is named after a river, in this case the Würm in Bavaria, a tributary of the Amper.

The Würm ice age can be dated to about 115,000 to 11,700 years ago. Sources differ about the dates, depending on whether the long transition phases between the glacials and interglacials (warmer periods) are allocated to one or other of those periods. The average annual temperatures during the Würm ice age in the Alpine Foreland were below −3 °C (today +7 °C). That has been determined from changes in the vegetation (pollen analysis), as well as differences in the facies.

== Corresponding glaciations worldwide ==
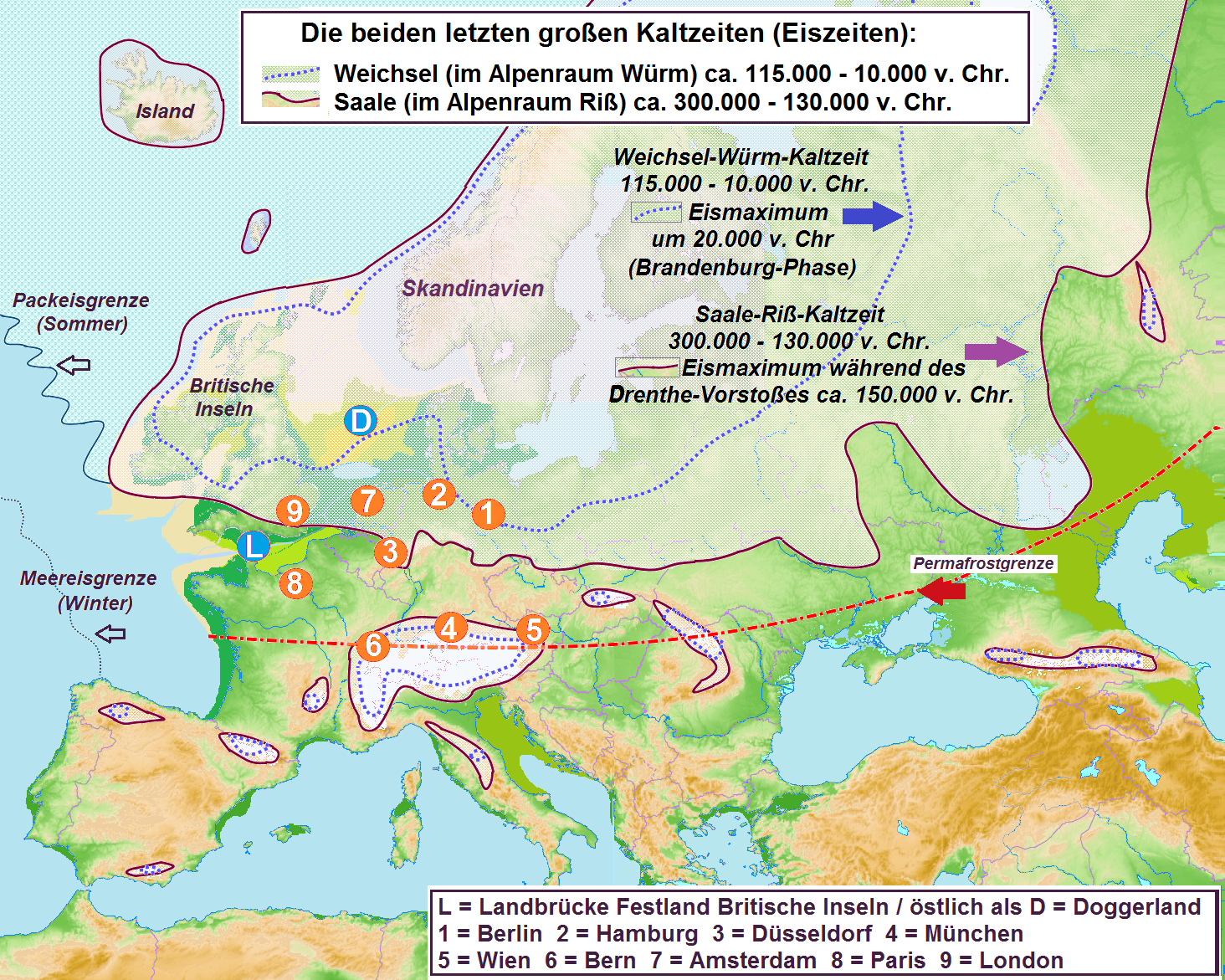
The Würm glaciation (in the north: the Weichselian) in comparison with the Riss (in the north:the Saale). The glacial advances were interrupted by warmer periods during which ancient European man, the Neanderthals, as successors of Homo heidelbergensis, spread out from the mountain zones and over the permafrost boundary to the north and northeast. From about 40,000 BC modern Cro-Magnon man settled these regions.

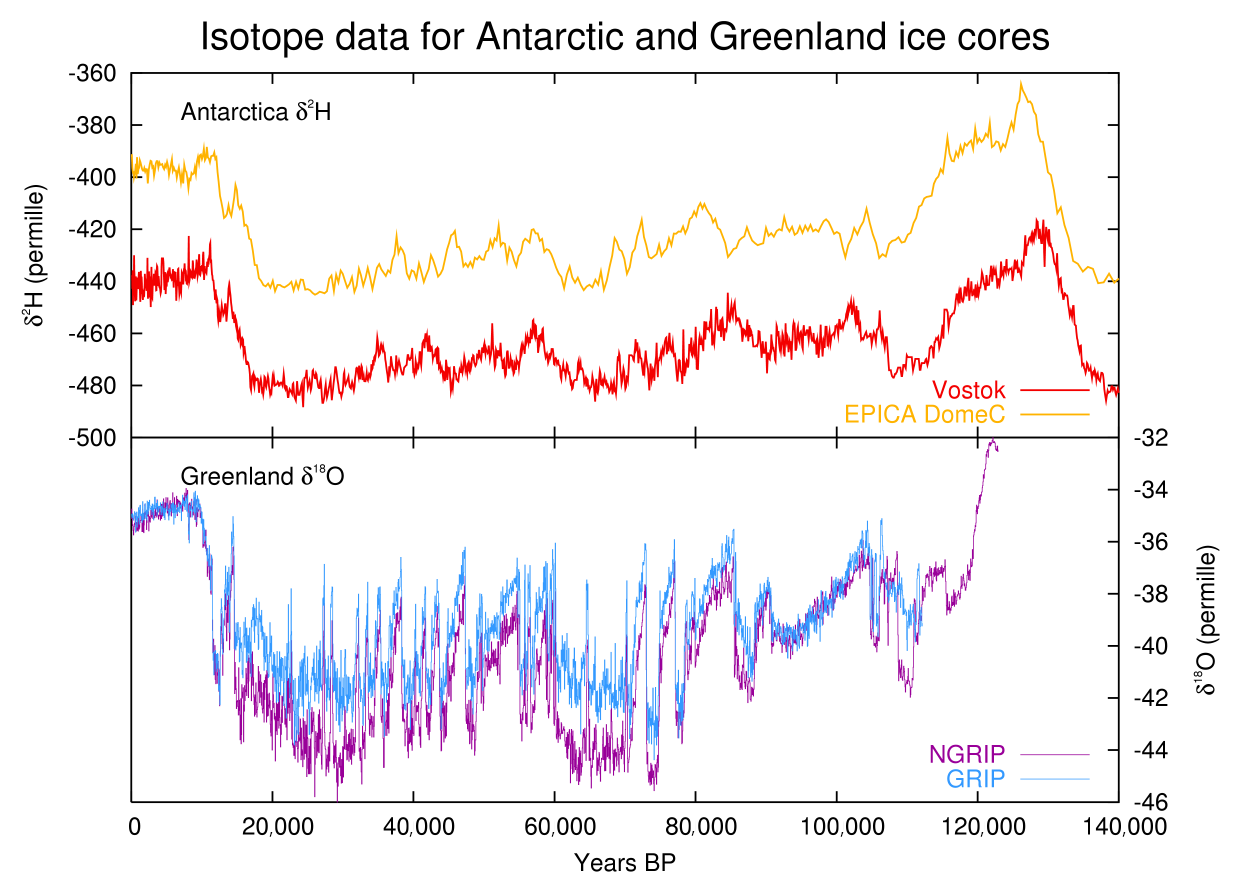
The Würm glaciation, shown in ice core data from Antarctica and Greenland

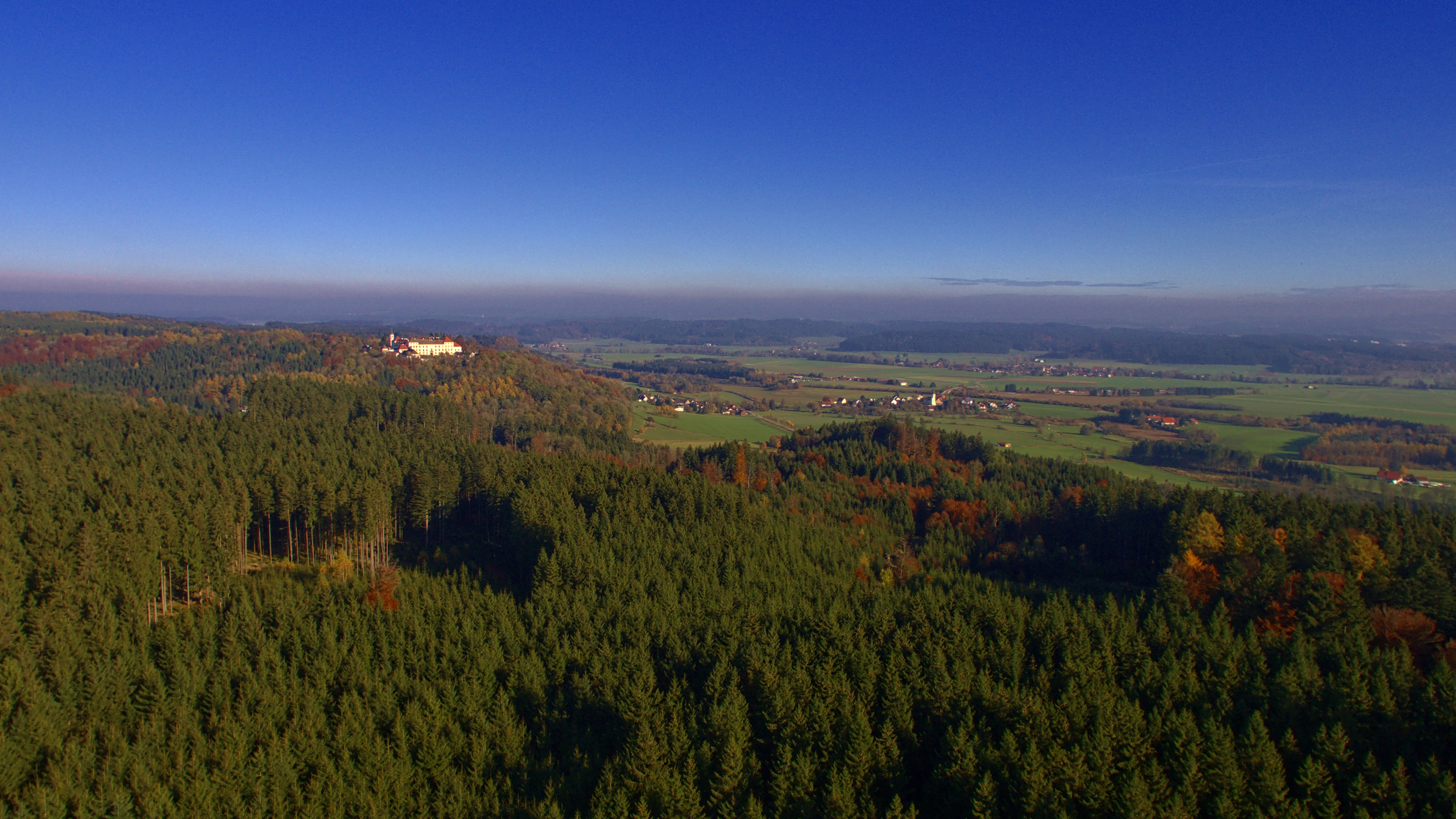
Moraines and gravel beds formed in the Würm glaciation near Leutkirch, Westallgäu, Germany, Zeil castle can be seen on the left

The corresponding ice age in North and Central Europe is known as the Weichselian glaciation, after the German name for the Vistula river. Despite the global changes in climate that were responsible for the major glaciations cycles, the dating of the Alpine ice sheet advances does not correlate automatically with the farthest extent of the Scandinavian ice sheet. In North America the corresponding "last ice age" is called the Wisconsin glaciation.

== Temporal classification ==
In the Gelasian, i.e. at the beginning of the Quaternary period around 2.6 million years ago, an ice age began in the northern hemisphere which continues today. Characteristic of such ice ages is the glaciation of the polar caps. After the Gelasian followed the Early, Middle and Late Pleistocene with a succession of several warm and cold periods. The latter are often called "ice ages" or "glacials", the former term often being confused with the overarching ice age period. The warm periods are called "interglacials".

Glaciers repeatedly advanced from the Alps to the northern molasse foreland and left moraines and meltwater deposits behind that are up to several hundred metres thick. Today, the Pleistocene epoch in the Alps is divided into several phases: the Biber, Danube, Günz, Haslach, Mindel, Riss and Würm glaciations. The greatest ice advance into the Alpine Foreland took place during the Riss glaciation, cf. the Saale glaciation in northern Europe.

The most recent foreland glaciation, the Würm, did not have such an extensive and solid glacial front. Nevertheless, its terminal moraines, which indicate the perimeter of the ice sheet, extend as a single tongue well into the foreland. Whilst they were hemmed in by the high mountainsides of the Alps, once these rivers of ice entered the foreland they often combined to form huge glaciers.

The moraines and gravel beds formed in the Würm glaciation are the best preserved, because since then there have been no more similar geological processes. Traces of the ice sheet have not been scoured out by later glaciers or overlaid by their sediments. This allows a more precise dating for the Würm glaciation than for earlier ice ages.

The Würm glaciation was preceded by the Eemian, which began about 126,000 years ago and lasted until 115,000 years ago. Then there was a significant slowdown, characterized by occasional fluctuations of several degrees in average temperatures. The various advances and retreats of glaciers associated with these temperature fluctuations, are called "stadials" (periods of relatively low temperatures) and "interstadials" (relatively higher temperatures).

The Würm Glacial ended around 11,700 years ago with the beginning of the Holocene. The cold period was followed by another warming which continues today and during which the glaciers are retreating. However, even in the Holocene there have been variations in temperature and ice advances, the last one in the modern era being the so-called Little Ice Age. The Holocene is considered an "interglacial" of a larger ice age, since the poles and the high mountain areas are still glaciated.

== See also ==
- Glacial series
- Glaciology

== Sources ==
- Roland Walter: Geologie von Mitteleuropa. Schweizerbartsche Verlagsbuchhandlung, Stuttgart, 1992, ISBN 3-510-65149-9
- René Hantke: Eiszeitalter. Band 2: Letzte Warmzeiten, Würm-Eiszeit, Eisabbau und Nacheiszeit der Alpen-Nordseite vom Rhein- zum Rhone-System. Ott, Thun, 1980, ISBN 3-7225-6259-7
- Hans Graul, Ingo Schäfer: Zur Gliederung der Würmeiszeit im Illergebiet. Straub, Munich, 1953. (Geologica Bavarica, 18).
- Wolfgang Frey, Rainer Lösch: Lehrbuch der Geobotanik, Pflanze und Vegetation in Raum und Zeit. Elsevier Spektrum Akademischer Verlag, ISBN 3-8274-1193-9
- Dirk van Husen: Die Ostalpen in den Eiszeiten, Aus der Geologischen Geschichte Österreichs, Geologische Bundesanstalt Wien, ISBN 3-900312-58-3
- Rolf K. Meyer, Hermann Schmidt-Kaler: Auf den Spuren der Eiszeit südlich von München – östlicher Teil, Wanderungen in die Erdgeschichte, Vol. 8, ISBN 978-3-931516-09-3
