= Hochfirst =

Hochfirst is the name of the following geographical features:

- Hochfirst (Black Forest), a mountain in the Black Forest, Baden-Württemberg, Germany
- Hochfirst (Ötztal Alps) (Hoher First), a mountain in the Ötztal Alps, in Austria and Italy
- Hochfirst (ridge), a ridge between Erisried and Sontheim in Unterallgäu, Bavaria, Germany; see Biber (geology)
