= Zungenbecken =

Glacial series

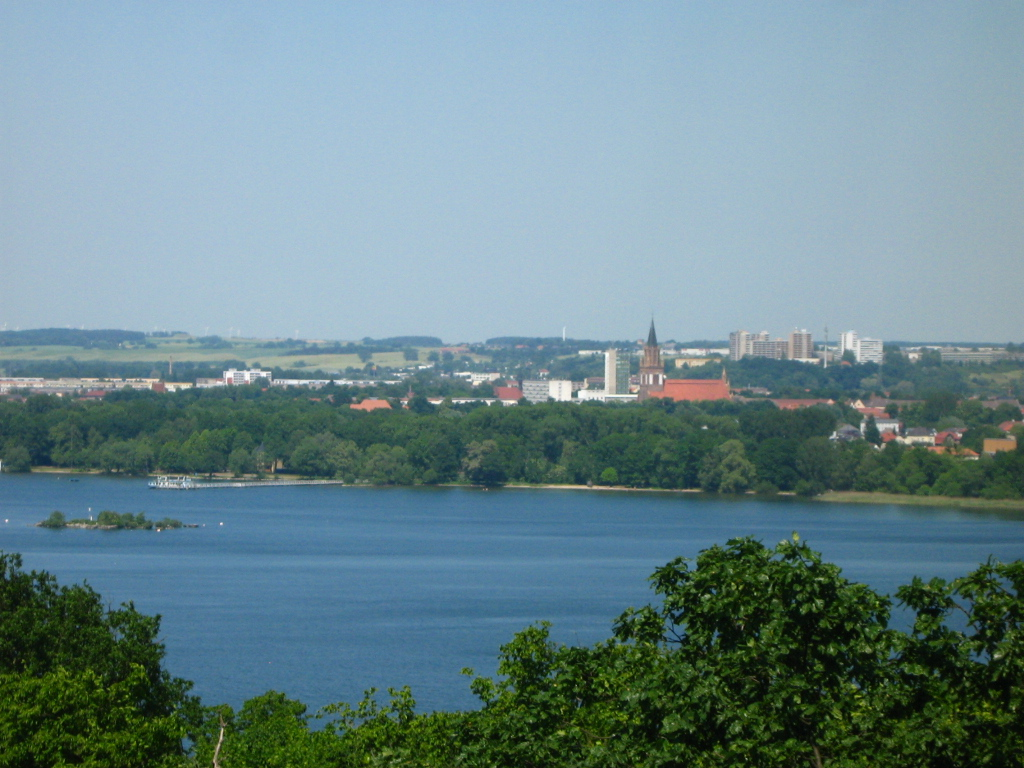
The Tollensesee, a glacial finger lake

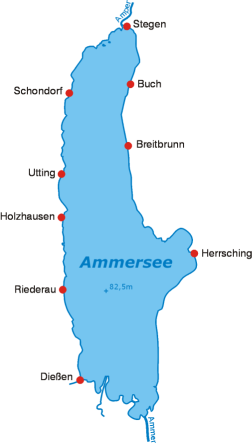
Map of the Ammersee showing its elongated shape

A Zungenbecken (German pronunciation: [ˈtsʊŋənˌbɛkn̩]), also called a tongue basin or tongue-basin, is part of a succession of ice age geological landforms, known as a glacial series. It is a hollow that is left behind by the ice mass, as the snout of the glacier (German: Gletscherzunge, lit. 'glacier tongue') recedes, which initially fills with meltwater, forming a proglacial lake, and later may be filled with surface water from streams or precipitation. When the glacier has more fully retreated this produces a finger lake or glacial piedmont lake (German: Zungenbeckensee, known as a Gletscherendsee of the glacial series in the Alpine Foreland). The term Zungenbecken is of German origin, but used in English language sources.

Examples are the Tegernsee, Ammersee, Starnberger See, Lake Constance, Chiemsee, Tollensesee and the Baltic Sea.

== See also ==
- Glacier
- Drumlin
