= Danube-Gunz interglacial =

The Danube-Gunz interglacial (German: Donau-Günz-Interglazial), Danube-Gunz warm period (Donau-Günz-Warmzeit), often just Danube-Gunz, or also Uhlenberg interglacial (Uhlenberg-Warmzeit) are historical terms for a hypothetical warm period of the Pleistocene in the Alps, between the Danube and Gunz glacials. The interglacial was defined as the erosion phase that followed the Danube glacial and preceded the Gunz stage. It is therefore represented by the gap between the two depositions that are attributed to the two cold periods; in the type regions of the two glacial there are various depositions. In the area of the Iller-Lech Plateau they lie between the Lower Deckschotter (Untere Deckschottern) of the Zusam Plateau and the Intermediate Deckschotter (Zwischenschottern); in the region of the Salzach Glacier between the Eichwald Schotter and the Older Deckenschotter (Ältere Deckenschottern); and the area of Traun and Enns between the Prägünz Schotter and the Older Deckenschotter. The erosion phase linked with this interglacial is very distinct and the composition of the gravels (Schotter) in the area east of the Rhine Glacier changes markedly.

Modern research has found that both Danube and Gunz correspond to many glacial cycles, as identified by marine isotope stages, making the term Danube-Gunz superfluous. The term is not used in the 2016 version of the detailed stratigraphic table by the German Stratigraphic Commission.

== See also ==
- Timeline of glaciation
