= Iller-Lech Plateau =

Natural region of Germany

Coordinates: 48.2431°N 10.3633°E

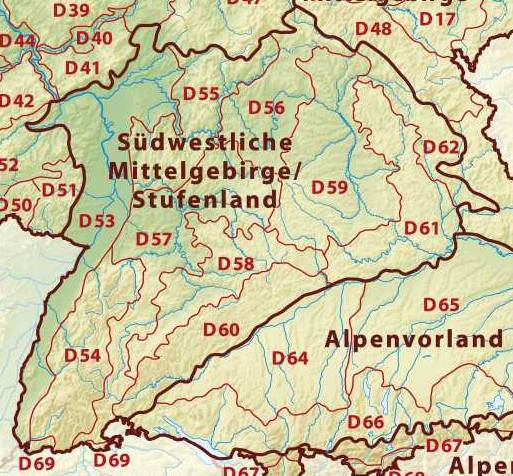
The Iller-Lech Plateau (region D64)

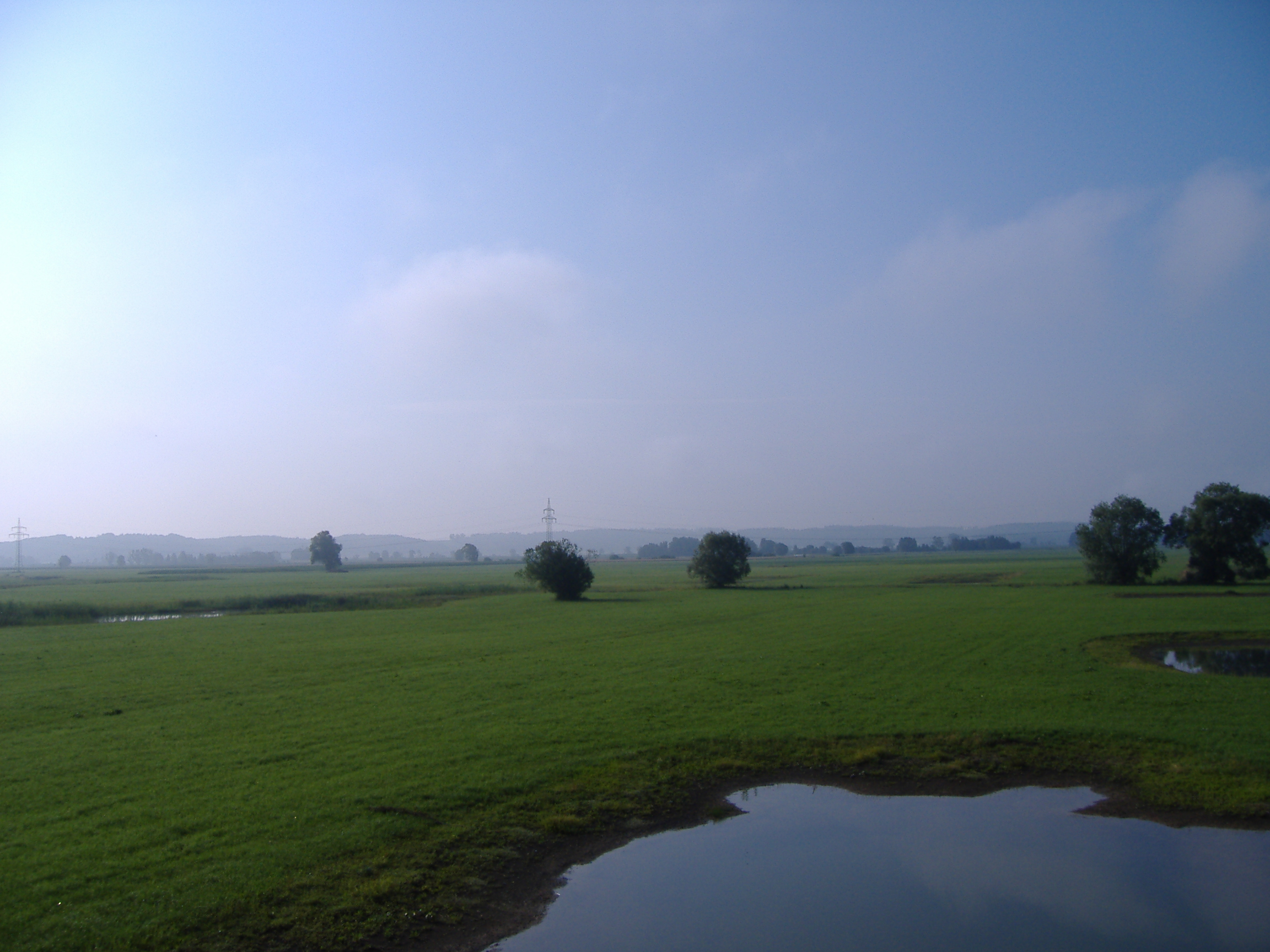
Bird habitat in the eastern Donauried

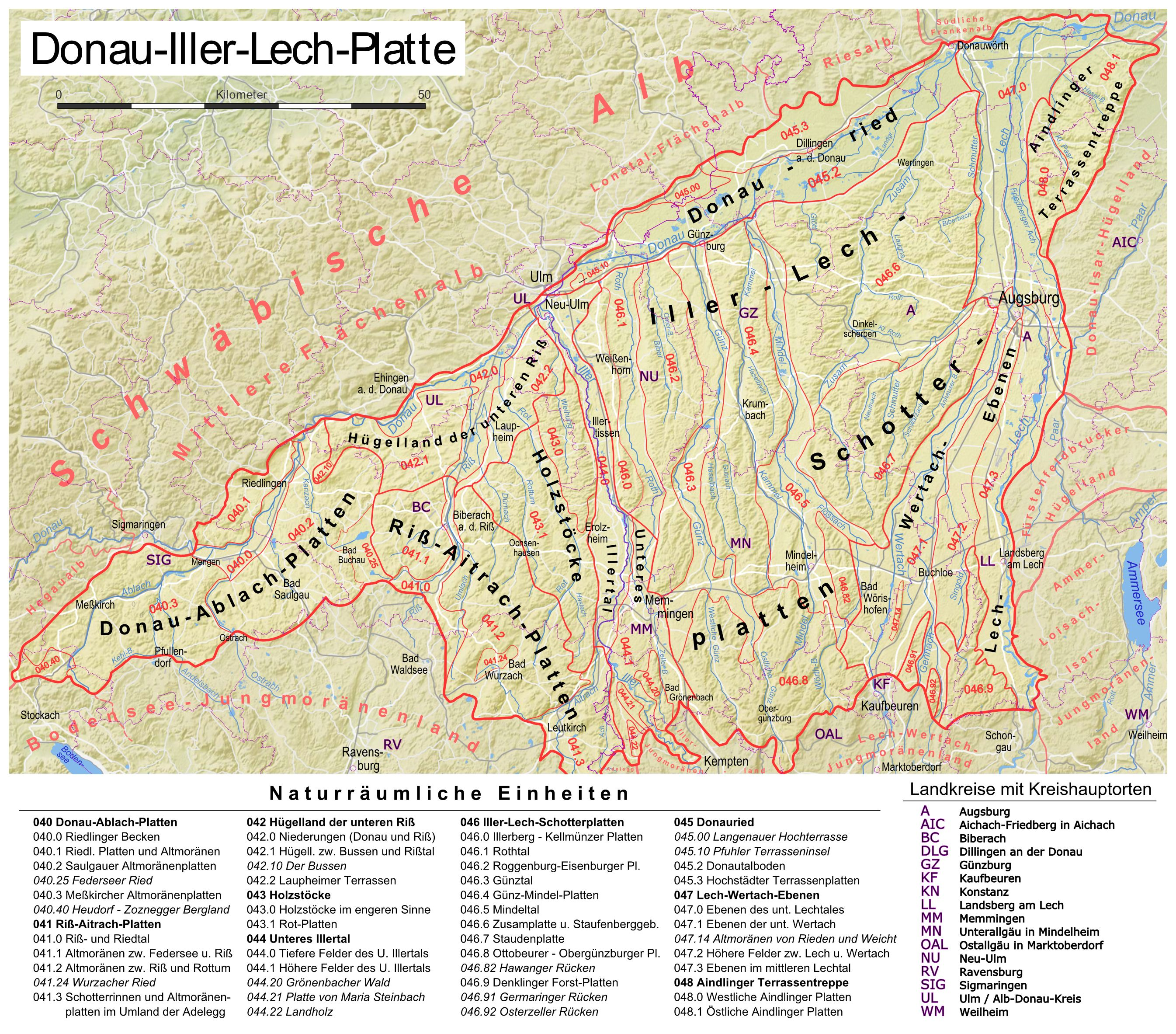
The Sub-divisions of the Iller-Lech Plateau

The Iller-Lech Plateau (German: Donau-Iller-Lech-Platte), also known as the Upper Swabian Plateau (Oberschwäbische Hochebene), is one of the natural regions of Germany.

== Boundaries ==
In the northwest the Iller-Lech Plateau borders on the Swabian Jura (unit D60 on the map) and, in the extreme northeast, on the Franconian Jura (unit D61 on the map). The boundary with these two natural regions is roughly formed by the course of the river Danube.

In the east the Iller-Lech Plateau borders on the Lower Bavarian Upland and Isar-Inn Gravel Plateaus (unit D65 on the map). North of Augsburg its eastern boundary runs roughly parallel to state road 2035 (Augsburg-Pöttmes-Neuburg an der Donau), south of Augsburg east of the Lech, roughly between Mering, Geltendorf and Schongau.

To the south the Southern Alpine Foreland (D66 on the map) borders on the Iller-Lech Plateau. The boundary between these two natural regions is partly formed by the terminal moraines of the Würm glaciation.

== Sub-divisions ==
The sub-divisions are based upon the natural regions of Germany as shown on the BfN's Landscapes in Germany map. In the following table these sub-divisions are described from west to east. For the exact location and boundaries of the individual sub-divisions: see the BfN's map Landscapes in Germany (http://www.bfn.de/geoinfo/landscapes/)

=== Sub-divisions in Baden-Württemberg ===
Geographical location	Formation	Relief	Soil / Land use	Remarks
Danube-Ablach Plateaus
Region between Danube, Mühlingen, Pfullendorf, Ostrach, Bad Saulgau and Federsee	Old Drift landscape dominated by the Rift and Mindel glaciation of the Rhine Glacier	Gently rolling hill country	Decalcified, waterlogged, brown earth (Parabraunerde) in the valleys to great depth, hence meadow and pasture land; Alternation of open landscape in valleys and forested ridges (pine forests); On good soils: arable land	
Danube Valley between Mengen and Ulm, Lower Riss Valley
Danube Valley between Mengen and Ulm, region between Herbertingen and Bad Saulgau, Riss Valley from Schemmerhofen to where it joins the Danube	From Mengen to the narrow gap by the southernmost outliers of the Swabian Jura the floor of the Danube Valley is filled with Würm Ice Age gravels from the Rhine Glacier; Beyond this gap the Danube flows through a scoured basin of reed marsh	Flat	Much grassland and arable farming	The Riss valley from the south which merges into the Danube valley is more marshy that the Danube valley
Federsee Ried
The Federsee lies in the middle of this natural region near Bad Buchau	Former tongue-basins (central basin) from the Riss glaciation with the extensive silted-up areas (Verlandungsgebieten); In the south the silted-up areas give way to Young Drift	Flat	On the silted-up areas there is extensive pastureland in places; In the transition zone between the silted-up areas and the Young Drift moraines the reeds and wetlands vegetation gives way to stands of coniferous forest	Because the lake has since been filled with sediment and gravel in places, the natural dammed lake was once much large
Western Plain of the Lower Riss
Region between Danube, Riss and, roughly, the B 312	Tertiary Hill Country, in places however also ice age gravel deposits	Hilly	Agricultural land use predominates because the soils are loamy and fertile	The Bussen is in this region
Western and Eastern Riss-Aitrach Plateaus
Western boundary: Schemmerhofen – Federsee – Bad Waldsee; Northern boundary: Schemmerhofen – Ochsenhausen; Eastern boundary: Ochsenhausen – Aitrach – Legau; Southern boundary: Bad forestsee – Leutkirch im Allgäu; Boundary between the Western and Eastern Riss-Aitrach Plateaus: Bad Waldsee - Eberhardzell	Riss glaciation terminal or ground moraine landscape	Undulating	Western part: arable land dominates due to the covering of loess, grassland in the wet valleys; Eastern part: much of the landscape is wet or boggy; mainly open landscape with meadows and pastures	The Wurzach Ried is in the east of the Riss-Aitrach Plateau
Holzstöcke
Region between Senden, Aichstetten, Ochsenhausen and Laupheim	Part of the ice-age formed terraced landscape between Riss and Iller; Divided by numerous hollows (Muldentäler) and meltwater troughs	Rolling hills	Mostly loam and loess covered, ridges however loam-free, decalcified and therefore forested; Rapid alternation of open country (more grassland than arable land) and wooded areas (pine forests)	Landscape still not very dissected
Eastern Plain of the Lower Riss
Region between Neu-Ulm, Senden and Laupheim	Comprises various old gravel terraces along the valleys of the Riss and Danube, formed during the Riss glaciation		Intensive arable land use	The south is less dissected by valleys than the north

=== Sub-divisions in both Baden-Württemberg and Bavaria ===
Geographical location	Formation	Relief	Soil / Land use	Remarks
Higher Plains of the Lower Iller Valley (south of Memmingen) and Lower Plains of the Lower Iller Valley (north of Memmingen)
Iller Valley from Altusried and Dietmannsried to where it joins the Danube at Neu-Ulm	Broad valley filled by large quantities of gravel during and after the ice ages	Flat	The north is used more for arable farming; the south more as grassland	In the southern part the Iller valley, which has cut down to the Tertiary bedrock, crosses the Young and Old Drift deposits; In places, continuous alluvial forest, in places still bog
Donauried
Large fen plain by the Danube between Neu-Ulm and Donauwörth	Würm Ice Age formed, partly boggy gravel plain	Flat	Used predominately for grassland and arable land, which has largely displaced the natural reed beds	Many gravel pits

=== Sub-divisions in Bavaria ===
Geographical location	Formation	Relief	Soil / Land use	Remarks
Upper and Lower Iller-Lech Gravel Plateaus
Northern boundary: Donauried (Neu-Ulm – Nersingen – Günzburg - Offingen); Western boundary: Iller or Günz Valley in places (Neu-Ulm – Illertissen – Kellmünz an der Iller – Babenhausen – Bad Grönenbach); Southern boundary: Dietmannsried – Obergünzburg – Friesenried; Eastern boundary: Mindel between Offingen and Thannhausen – Markt Wald – Bad Wörishofen – Pforzen; Boundary roughly between the Upper and Lower Iller-Lech Gravel Plateaus: Babenhausen – Mindelheim – Markt Wald	Gently undulating glacial gravels divided into interfluvial ridges and gravel plateaus by river systems flowing from south to north	Gently undulating	Glacial gravels partly covered by loess; Interfluvials: Covered by forest (especially pine forests); River valleys: in the north more arable land, in the south more grassland	Gravel extraction in the Mindel and Günz Valleys; Fens were largely drained
Stauden Plateau (Stauden) / Zusam Plateau and Stauffenberg Region (Reischenau and Holzwinkel)
Between Mindel and Flossach Valley in the west (Offingen, Thannhausen and Türkheim) and the Lech and/or Wertach Valley in the east; Northern boundary: Offingen – Holzheim – Wertingen – Buttenwiesen; Boundary between the Stauden Plateau and Zusam Plateau and Stauffenberg region: Thannhausen – Fischach - Stadtbergen	Region is divided by the Schmutter and Zusam into gently undulating plateaus and flat interfluves; Numerous bogs on the valley floors of the partly asymmetrically shaped valleys	Gently undulating	Relatively high proportion of forest and grassland (on the Stauden Plateau higher than in the more northern area of the Zusam Plateau and Stauffenberg region); Pine forests dominated the woodland areas	The Stauden Plateau, Zusam Plateau and Stauffenberg region together form the Augsburg-Westliche Wälder Nature Park
Lower and Upper Lech-Wertach Plain
Northern boundary: near Bobingen; Western boundary: Pforzen – Bad Wörishofen – Rammingen – Bobingen; Southern boundary: Pforzen – Denklingen; Eastern boundary: Denklingen – Untermeitingen – Bobingen; Boundary lies roughly between the Upper and Lower Lech-Wertach Plain: Türkheim – Schwabmünchen - Kaufering	Divided into lower terrace landscape by the Rivers Wertach and Gennach; Meadows and lower terraces partly waterlogged	Flat	The Brennen are covered by pine forests; Intensive agricultural land use (in the south more grassland, in the north more arable land)	There are only a few remnants of the formerly widespread heath landscape; Together the Upper and the Lower Lech-Wertach Plains form the Lechfeld (Lech Plateau)
Sachsenried and Denklingen Rotwald
Between Gennach and Lech, south of Denklingen	Dominated by the high terrace gravels of the Lech in the north; In the south dominated by Riss Ice Age morainic material, that covers the Tertiary bedrock	Flat to hilly	Pure forest landscape (mainly pine forests)	
Lech Valley
Lech Valley from Schongau to Augsburg and from Augsburg to where it joins the Danube	Extensive deposits of post-glacial gravel between Klosterlechfeld and the confluence with the Danube; North of Augsburg: broad U-shaped valley (Kastental) with gravel terraces of different ages; steps between the lower terraces and the loess-covered upper terraces 8 to 10 m high; Meadows and lower terraces waterlogged in places		Mostly used as grassland; On the upper terrace chiefly arable farming; The further north, the more arable farming predominates	Meadows and lower terraces in places covered by heaths with communities of nutrient-poor, chalk grasses and wasteland plants characteristic of the region; Almost continuous belt of alluvial forest along the river
Aindlingen Terrace
Western boundary: Lech Valley; Eastern boundary: parallel to state road 2035 (Augsburg-Pöttmes-Neuburg by the Danube); Northern boundary: Danube Valley	High gravel plateau, rising towards the east; Divided by deep stream valley that are mostly asymmetrical	Hilly	Thick layer of loess; Valley floors mainly covered by grassland; Otherwise arable land predominates	
Landsberg Plateau
Western boundary: Mering – Landsberg am Lech – Fuchs Valley; Eastern boundary: Mering – Geltendorf – Fuchs Valley	Landscape rising from north to south	Gently undulating	Arable land predominates	Together with the Fürstenfeldbruck hill country forms one of the semi-circular Old Drift moraines in front of the adjoining Ammer-Loisach Hills

== See also ==
- Natural regions of Germany

== Sources ==
  - Natural regions of Germany
  - Bavarian Alpine Foreland
  - Riedel
- Bayernviewer at the Bavarian Measurement Office: http://www.geodaten.bayern.de/BayernViewer/index.cgi
- Map of the BfN's Landscapes in Germany: http://www.bfn.de/geoinfo/landscapes/ and the information pages of the individual sub-divisions of the Iller-Lech Plateau
