= Biber-Danube interglacial =

The Biber-Danube interglacial (German: Biber-Donau-Interglazial) or Biber-Danube warm period (Biber-Donau-Warmzeit) is a historical term for a hypothetical warm period of the Pleistocene epoch in the Alps, between the Biber and Danube glaciations. It was defined as an erosion phase, that followed the Biber and preceded the Danube glacial. Thus, it represented the gap between the depositions that are ascribed to the two cold periods.

Modern research has found that both Biber and Danube correspond to many glacial cycles, as identified by approximately 80 marine isotope stages (MIS), making the term Biber-Danube superfluous. The term is not used in the 2016 version of the detailed stratigraphic table by the German Stratigraphic Commission.

== See also ==
- Timeline of glaciation
