= Bad Füssing =

- Municipality
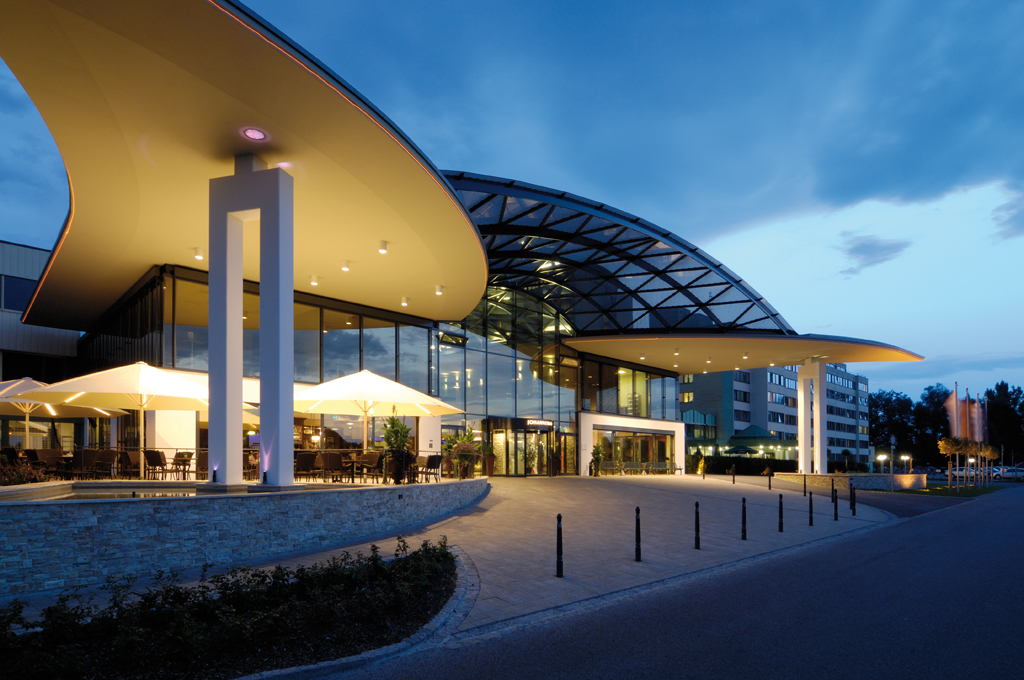
- Entrance to Johannesbad spa

- Coat of arms

- Location of Bad Füssing within Passau district
- Interactive map of Bad Füssing
- Location within Germany Location within Bavaria
- Coordinates: 48°21′N 13°18′E
- Country: Germany
- State: Bavaria
- Admin. region: Niederbayern
- District: Passau

Government
  - Mayor (2020–26): Tobias Kurz

Area
  - Total: 55.06 km^{2} (21.26 sq mi)
- Elevation: 320 m (1,050 ft)

Population (2025-12-31)
  - Total: 8,062
  - Density: 146.4/km^{2} (379.2/sq mi)
- Time zone: UTC+01:00 (CET)
  - Summer (DST): UTC+02:00 (CEST)
- Postal codes: 94072
- Dialling codes: 08531
- Vehicle registration: PA
- Website: www.gde-badfuessing.de

Bad Füssing (German pronunciation: [baːt ˈfʏsɪŋ]; Central Bavarian: Fiassing) is a municipality in the district of Passau in Bavaria in Germany. Located some 3 km from the river Inn, which creates a border to Austria.

== Attractions ==
Known for its thermal baths, Bad Füssing is part of the Lower Bavarian Spa Triangle.

The sulphurous water source of 56 °C was found in 1938 in a depth of about 1 km when drilling for oil. The first spa started only in 1950 and later developed to more establishments. There are three public baths, the largest is based on a well bored in 1964.
