= Danube (geology) =

Danube or Donau is a timespan in the glacial history of the Alps. Danube is currently regarded to have started approximately 1.8 million years ago, at the start of the Calabrian age of the international geochronology. It ended approximately one million years ago. Deep sea core samples have identified approximately 20 glacial cycles during Danube.

== History of the term ==
The Danube glaciation, Donau glaciation (German: Donau-Kaltzeit) or the Danube Glacial (Donau-Glazial) was named by Barthel Eberl in 1930 after the River Danube. It did not appear in the traditional, quadripartite ice age schema of the Alps by Albrecht Penck. The Danube was the oldest glaciation in the Alps for which there was evidence outside of the Iller-Lech region. Danube Stage was thought to be preceded by the Biber-Danube interglacial and followed by the Danube-Günz interglacial.

The 2016 version of the detailed stratigraphic table by the German Stratigraphic Commission firmly places Danube (Donau) in the Calabrian and illustrates a continuity of glacial cycles with the preceding Biber stage. The age of the transition to the following Gunz stage remains uncertain. Danube corresponds to Eburonian, Waalian, Menapian, and perhaps Bavelian in the glacial history of Northern Europe.

== Glacial cycles ==
Deep sea core samples have identified approximately 40 marine isotope stages (starting with MIS 63 and going no further than MIS 20). Thus, there have probably been about 20 glacial cycles of varying intensity during Danube. The dominant trigger is believed to be the 41 000 year Milankovitch cycles of axial tilt, but the Mid-Pleistocene Transition to 100,000 year cycles starts towards the end of Danube.

== See also ==
- Timeline of glaciation
