= Liebenerspitze =

Mountain in Italy

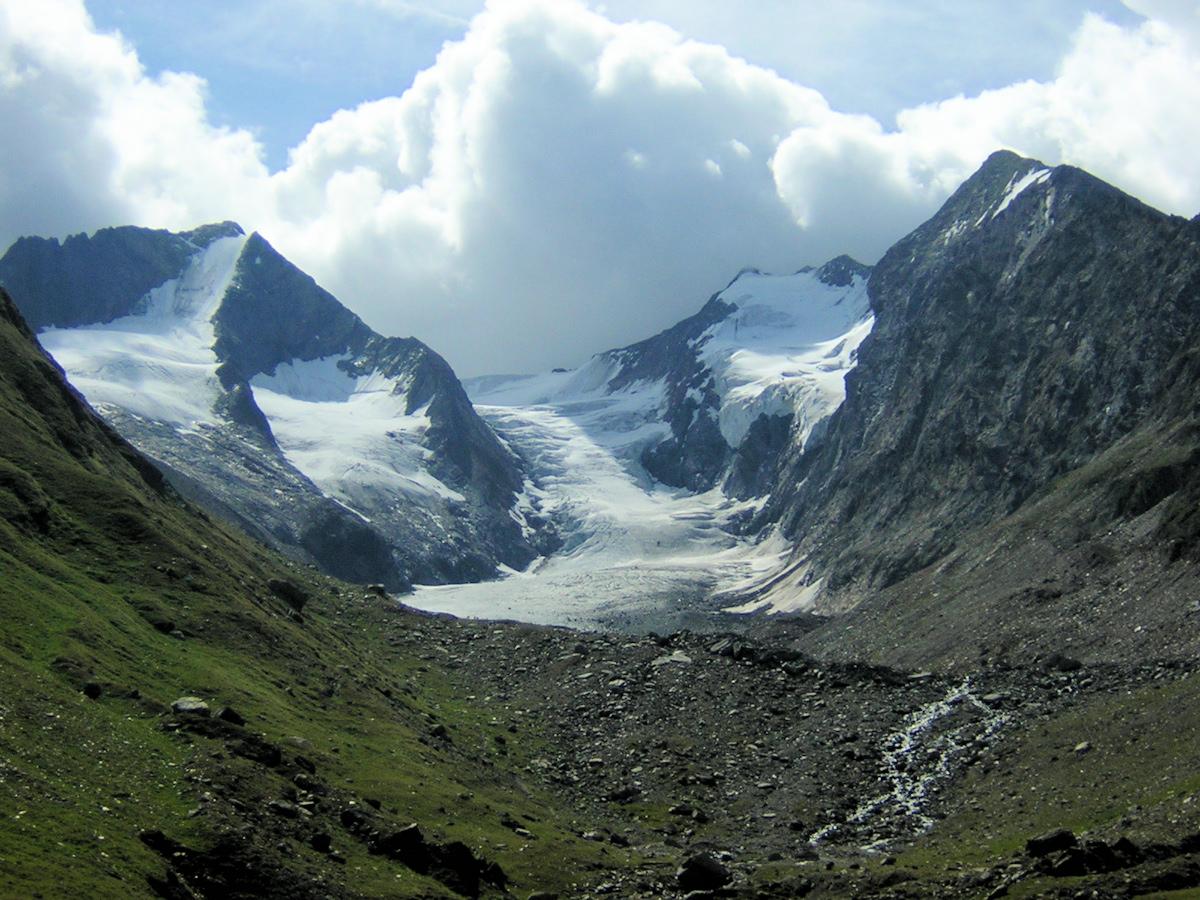
- Hochfirst (left) and Liebenerspitze (right of center) separated by the Gaisbergferner as seen from the north.

Highest point
- Elevation: 3,400 m (11,200 ft)
- Prominence: 167 m (548 ft)
- Parent peak: Hochfirst
- Coordinates: 46°49′13″N 11°04′33″E

Geography
- Location within Austria
- Location: Tyrol, Austria / South Tyrol, Italy
- Parent range: Ötztal Alps

Climbing
- First ascent: 26 July 1872 Victor Hecht and Johann Pinggera

The Liebenerspitze is a mountain in the Gurgler Kamm group of the Ötztal Alps.
