= Finger lake =

Narrow, linear lake occupying a glacial valley

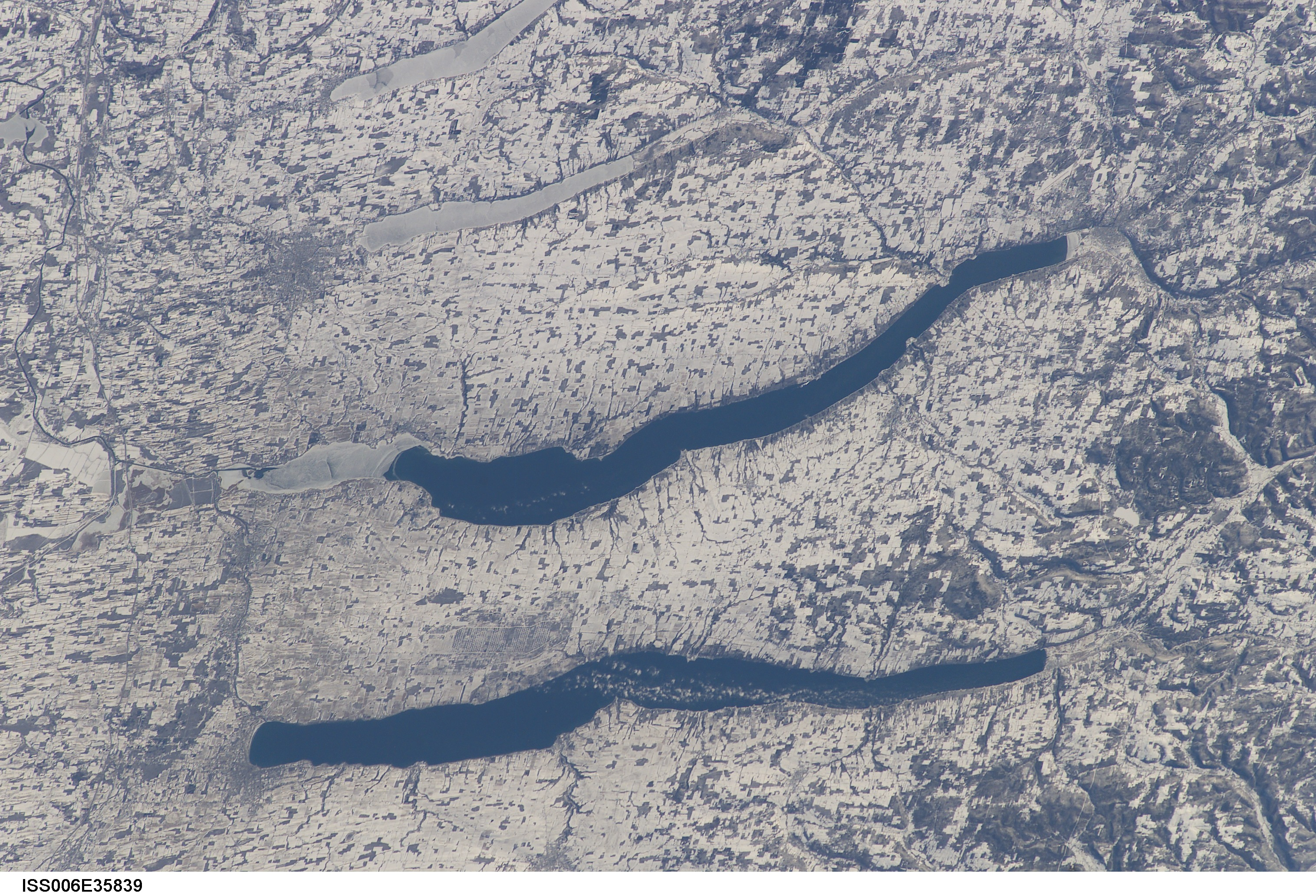
Finger Lakes of New York state, seen from the International Space Station

A finger lake, also known as a fjord lake or trough lake, is a narrow body of water occupying a glacially overdeepened valley, sometimes impounded by a terminal moraine. Where one end of a finger lake is drowned by the sea, it becomes a fjord or sea-loch.

== Examples ==
=== Italy ===
- The Italian Lakes of northern Italy and southern Switzerland are in part finger lakes.

=== New Zealand ===
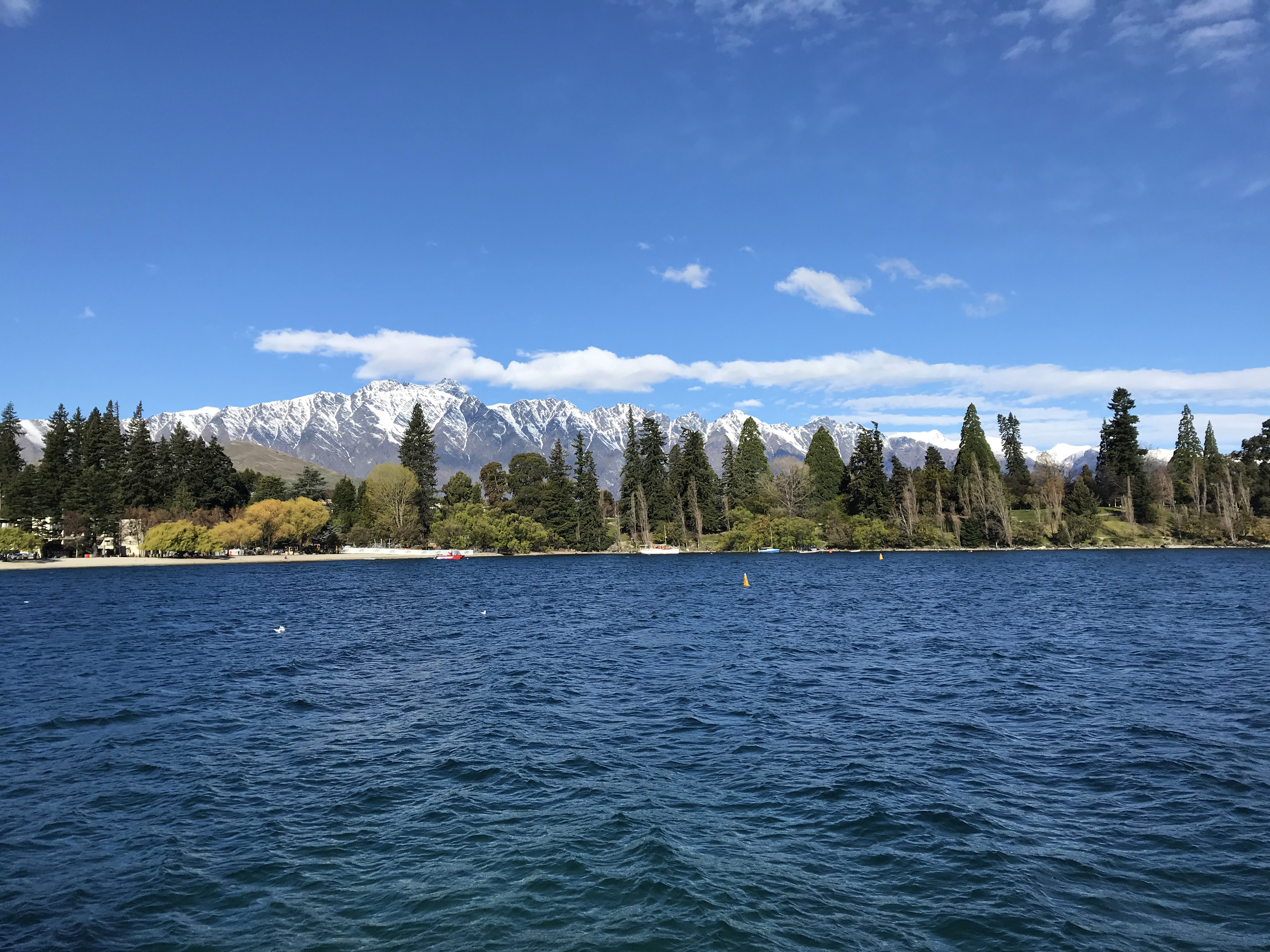
Lake Wakatipu and The Remarkables

- Lake Wakatipu, Otago, South Island.

=== United Kingdom ===
==== England ====
- Many of the lakes of the Lake District are finger lakes.

==== Scotland ====
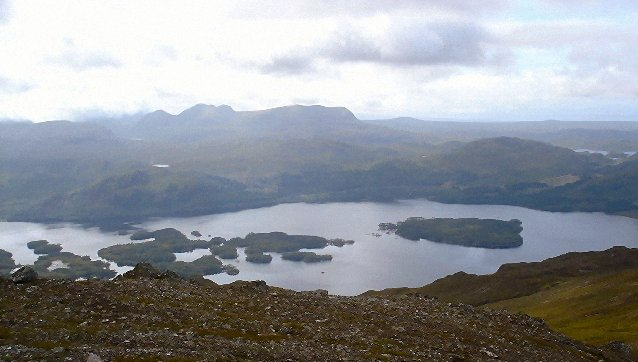
Loch Maree

- Many lochs of Scotland are finger lakes. Some like Loch Broom and Loch Maree form fjord and finger lake systems.

==== Wales ====
- Welsh llynnoedd

=== United States ===
- Finger Lakes, New York State

== See also ==
- Ribbon lake – Long and narrow, finger-shaped lake, usually found in a glacial trough
- Zungenbecken – Glacial series

== Works cited ==
- Hamblin, P. F.; Carmack, E. C. (1978). "River-Induced Currents in a Fjord Lake". Journal of Geophysical Research: Oceans. 83 (C2): 885–899. doi:10.1029/JC083iC02p00885. ISSN 2169-9291.
- Kotlyakov, Vladimir; Komarova, Anna (2007). Elsevier's Dictionary of Geography: in English, Russian, French, Spanish and German. Amsterdam: Elsevier. p. 255. ISBN 978-0-444-51042-6 – via Google Books.
- Whittow, John (1984). The Penguin Dictionary of Physical Geography. Harmondsworth, UK: Penguin Books. ISBN 0-14-051094-X – via the Internet Archive.
