= Biber (geology) =

Biber or the Biber Complex (German: Biber-Komplex) is a timespan approximately 2.6–1.8 million years ago in the glacial history of the Alps. Biber corresponds to the Gelasian age in the international geochronology, which since 2009 is regarded as the first age of the Quaternary period. Deep sea core samples have identified approximately 20 glacial cycles of varying intensity during Biber.

== History of the term ==
In 1953, Schaefer defined the Biber glaciation (German: Biber-Kaltzeit), Biber Glacial (Biber-Glazial), or Biber Ice Age (Biber-Eiszeit) from gravel landforms of the Stauden Plateau in the area of the Iller-Lech Plateau and in the Aindling terrace sequence, by grouping together the so-called Middle and Upper Cover Gravels or Deckenschotter. This corresponded to the Staufenberg Gravel Terrace on the Iller-Lech Plateau, identified in 1974 by Scheunenpflug, and the so-called High Gravels (Hochschottern) of the Aindling region. The rich crystalline sedimentary facies (Kristallinreiche Liegendfazies), that Löscher distinguished in 1976 in the area of the Rhine Glacier of the western Riß-Iller Plateau may also be paralleled with these glacial landforms. The gravels in the Iller-Lech region ascribed to the Biber glaciation are generally heavily weathered and originate from the Northern Limestone Alps. Löscher's Kristallinreiche Liegendfazies, by contrast, originates from the bedrock of the molasse zone.

The term Biber glaciation was not part of the traditional four-stage glaciation schema of the Alps by Albrecht Penck and Eduard Brückner, but was named after the Biberbach river north of Augsburg in 1953 by Ingo Schaefer, based on the naming system of the traditional Penck schema. Its type region is the Stauden Plateau in the Iller-Lech Plateaux and the Staufenberg Gravel Terrace in the area of Aindling. The Biber glaciation was thought to be followed by the Biber-Danube interglacial and the Danube glacial.

The absolute timing and the connexion with the glacial classification of North Germany and the Netherlands has been problematic. The Biber glacial was thought to correlate either to the Eburonian complex or the Pre-Tiglian complex in the Netherlands. In the former case it would correspond to MIS 56 to 62, which would place it in the period between 1.6 and 1.8 million years ago, in the latter case it would roughly correspond to MIS 96 to 100, and would therefore have taken place about 2.4 to 2.588 million years ago. The correlation was fraught with problems however due to the fact that the corresponding depositions in the Netherlands were probably not governed by climatic changes. Similar doubts on climatic grounds for the depositions assessed as Biber-related also exist in the Alpine region. It is possible that there were tectonic influences perhaps in the wake of the uplift phases of the Alps. The succession and appearance of the gravel bodies makes it possible that during their formation there were several periods of alternating fluvial erosion and accumulation. The Biber cold period at least corresponds partly with the Swiss cover gravel glaciations (Deckenschotter-Vergletscherungen).

The 2016 version of the detailed stratigraphic table by the German Stratigraphic Commission firmly places Biber in the Gelasian and gives a correspondence to Pre-Tegelen and Tegelen in the glacial geology of northern Europe. There is continuity between Biber and the glacial cycles of the following Danube stage

== Glacial cycles ==
Deep sea core samples have identified approximately 40 marine isotope stages (MIS 103 – MIS 64) during Biber. Thus, there have probably been about 20 glacial cycles of varying intensity during Biber. The dominant trigger is believed to be the 41 000 year Milankovitch cycles of axial tilt.

== Occurrence ==
Gravels ascribed to Biber (also called the Highland Gravel or Oldest Gravel (Ältester Deckenschotter) occur northwest of Augsburg as the Stauffenberg Gravel (Stauffenberg-Schotter), as well as northeast as the Hohenried Gravel (Hohenrieder Schotter) and southwest of Augsburg as the Stauden Plateau Gravel (Schotter der Stauden-Platte). Also included are isolated gravels of the Hochfirst near Mindelheim and the Stoffersberg near Landsberg am Lech. There may also be gravels in the Sundgau from the Biber ice age.

== See also ==
- Timeline of glaciation

== Literature ==
- K.A. Habbe; D. Ellwanger; R. Becker-Haumann (2007), "Stratigraphische Begriffe für das Quartär des süddeutschen Alpenvorlandes", Eiszeitalter und Gegenwart Quaternary Science Journal (in German), 56 (1/2): 66–83, doi:10.3285/eg.56.1-2.03, hdl:11858/00-1735-0000-0001-B9FE-0, ISSN 0424-7116
- T. Litt; et al. (2006), "Das Quartar in der Stratigraphischen Tabelle von Deutschland 2002" (PDF), Newsletters on Stratigraphy (in German), 41 (1–3): 385–399, doi:10.1127/0078-0421/2005/0041-0385, archived from the original (PDF) on 2015-09-23 – via Deutsche Quartärvereinigung
