= Old and Young Drift =

Glacial landscapes in Central Europe

Old and Young Drift are geographic names given to the morainic landscapes that were formed in Central Europe; the Old Drift during the older ice ages and the Young Drift during the latest glaciations – the Weichselian in North Germany and the Würm in the Alps. Their landforms are quite different. Areas of Old Drift have been heavily flattened and transformed as a result of geomorphic processes such as denudation and erosion, whilst areas of Young Drift have largely retained their original shape. Whilst the majority of Old Drift moraines were formed during the Saale glaciation about 130,000 to 140,000 years ago, the Young Drift moraines in Central Europe are only about 15,000 to 20,000 years old. The terms Old and Young Drift are used for all elements of the glacial series even though the meltwater deposits and landforms are not strictly moraines.

== Old Drift ==
The Old Drift landscapes were tundras or cold deserts during the last ice age. Periglacial processes resulted in significant ablation of higher terrain as well as accumulation of sediments in the depressions. As a result of that the old glacial forms have clearly been worn down. In addition almost all closed hollows (e. g. dead ice kettle holes) have been completely filled in. Old Drift landscapes are therefore much less relief-intensive than Young Drift regions and have hardly any natural lakes. The river system of Old Drift areas is normal and hierarchical.

Due to advanced weathering of the sediments near the surface, the soils are more heavily leached ( (brunified, decalcified and/or podsolized). The glacial till is generally decalcified to 3–4 metres; thinner strata may be entirely decalcified. Very common are wind-formed ablation or accumulation landforms, because during the glacial periods, the wind could easily blow sand and silt away due to the lack of a layer of vegetation. The presence of ventifacts, dunes and loess is thus typical of Old Drift areas.

== Young Drift ==
Young Drift morainic landscapes by contrast have new landforms that are still recognisable as glacial forms. There are numerous enclosed hollows, many of which are filled with water. The river system is often still immature and rather chaotic. There are numerous inland drainage areas. Ventifacts and dunes do occur; but these landforms are much younger and less intensively formed than in Old Drift country. The soils are markedly less weathered than those of the Old Drift. On areas of ground moraine, the depth of decalcification of the glacial till is thus often less than 1 metre.

== Literature ==
- Frank Ahnert (1996), Einführung in die Geomorphologie (in German) (1st ed.), Stuttgart: Verlag Eugen Ulmer, pp. 350 ff, ISBN 3-8252-8103-5
