= Waalian interglacial =

Interglacial period of the Early Pleistocene

The Waalian interglacial (German: Waal-Warmzeit or Waal-Interglazial) or Waalian Stage was an interglacial period of the Early Pleistocene in north-west Europe. It was preceded by the Eburonian Stage and succeeded by the Menapian Stage. It coincides with part of the much longer Beestonian stage in Britain. It is variously dated by different authorities. Oxford Reference gives 1.3 to 0.9 million years ago and the British Geological Survey 1.6 to 1.36 million years ago. However, the 2020 chart of the international authority on stratigraphic dating, the International Commission on Stratigraphy shows it as c. 1.6 to 1.4 million years ago. It is distinct from other Pleistocene periods in its complexity, vegetational composition, and vegetational succession.

Its name is derived from a major branch of the Rhine delta, the Waal.

== Distinguishing features ==
Unlike later interglacial periods, the Waalian Interglacial had at least one period of permafrost conditions, making it a "complex stage". It has been proposed that the Waalian Interglacial was composed of three phases: a temperate phase, a cool phase, and another temperate phase. The Waalian Interglacial is also distinct from later interglacial periods in that the migration of tree species during this period did not follow a clear pattern of succession (i.e., most of the species that were present at the end of the Waalian were there at the beginning). In addition, though earlier research indicated that the forest species assemblage of the Waalian period mirrored that of the Tiglian, more recent research into pollen records show that there was a marked decrease in the number of arboreal taxa from earlier Pleistocene periods. Common arboreal taxa from the Waalian period included Tsuga, Eucommia, Celtis, and Pterocarya.
