= Hochfirst (Ötztal Alps) =

Mountain in Italy

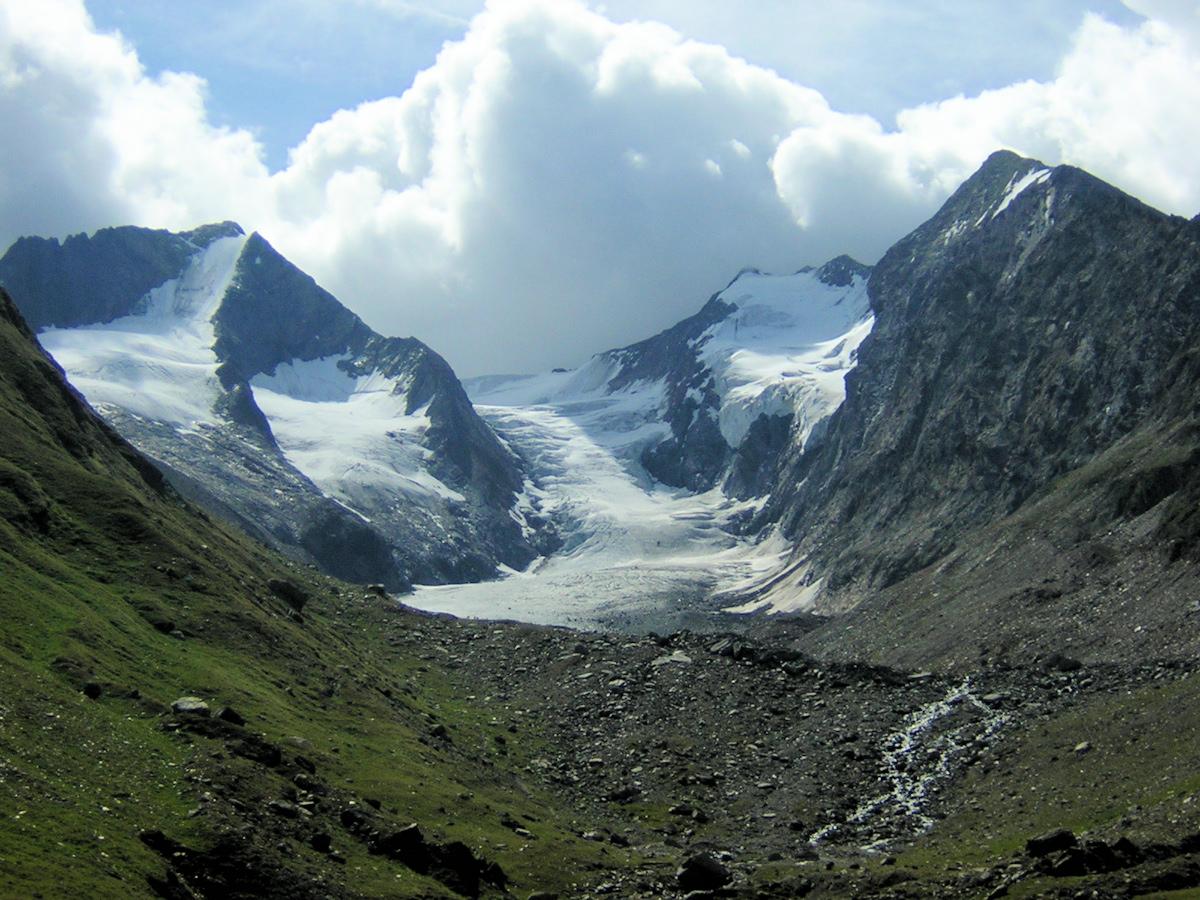
- Hochfirst (left) and Liebenerspitze (right of center) separated by the Gaisbergferner as seen from the north.

Highest point
- Elevation: 3,405 m (11,171 ft)
- Prominence: 393 m (1,289 ft)
- Parent peak: Hinterer Seelenkogel
- Listing: Alpine mountains above 3000 m
- Coordinates: 46°49′36″N 11°04′52″E

Geography
- Location within Austria
- Location: Tyrol, Austria / South Tyrol, Italy
- Parent range: Ötztal Alps

Climbing
- First ascent: 15 July 1870 by J. Scholz and J. Gärber guided by Peter Paul Gstrein and Blasis Grüner

The Hochfirst or Hoher First (Italian: Monte Principe) is a mountain in the main chain (Gurgler Kamm or "Gurgl Ridge") of the Ötztal Alps.
