= Glacial series =

Environmental Biome in Central Europe

The glacial series refers to a particular sequence of landforms in Central Europe that were formed during the Pleistocene glaciation beneath the ice sheets, along their margins and on their forelands during each glacial advance.

== Definition ==
The term "glacial series" (German: Glaziale Serie) was used as early as 1882 by Albrecht Penck initially for the northern Alpine Foreland. Later the term was expanded and used to refer to the Scandinavian glaciation region.

The elements of an ideal and complete glacial series are:

- a ground moraine with a tongue-like basin, the Zungenbecken
- a terminal moraine chain that lies in an arc around the Zungenbecken
- a gravel field or sandur outwash plain in front of the terminal moraine chain
- a glacial meltwater valley, the Urstromtal, through which meltwaters from the glacier flowed away.

The term "glacial series" is restricted to landforms created by glaciers and classified by geomorphological rules, as opposed to the glacial sediments and sedimentary rocks associated with glaciers and classified by their geological features. A complete glacial series is formed when the edge of the ice sheet remains static for a long time and is not destroyed again by a further advance of the ice mass.

== Glacial series in the Alpine Foreland ==
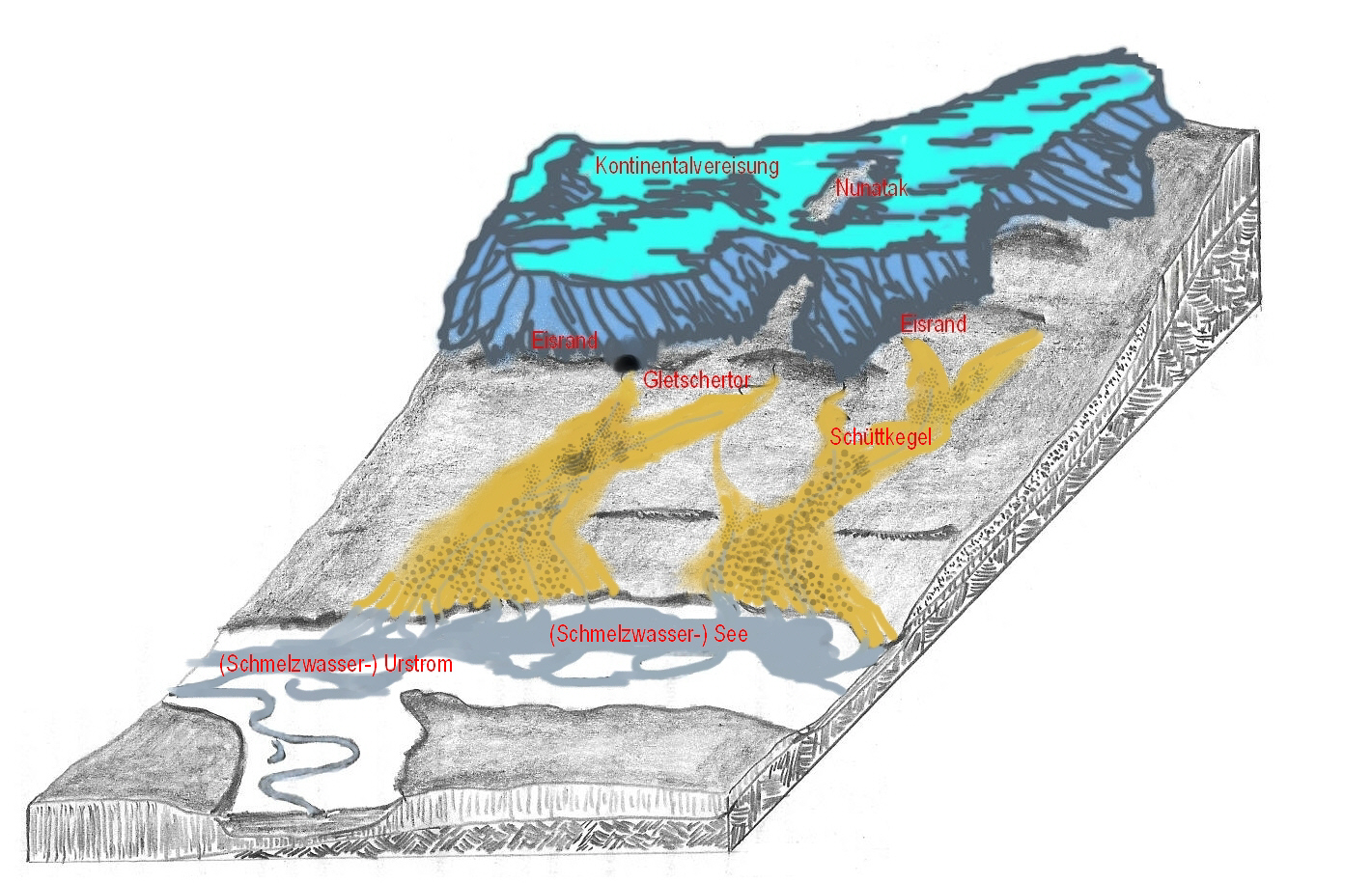
During glaciation (schematic representation)

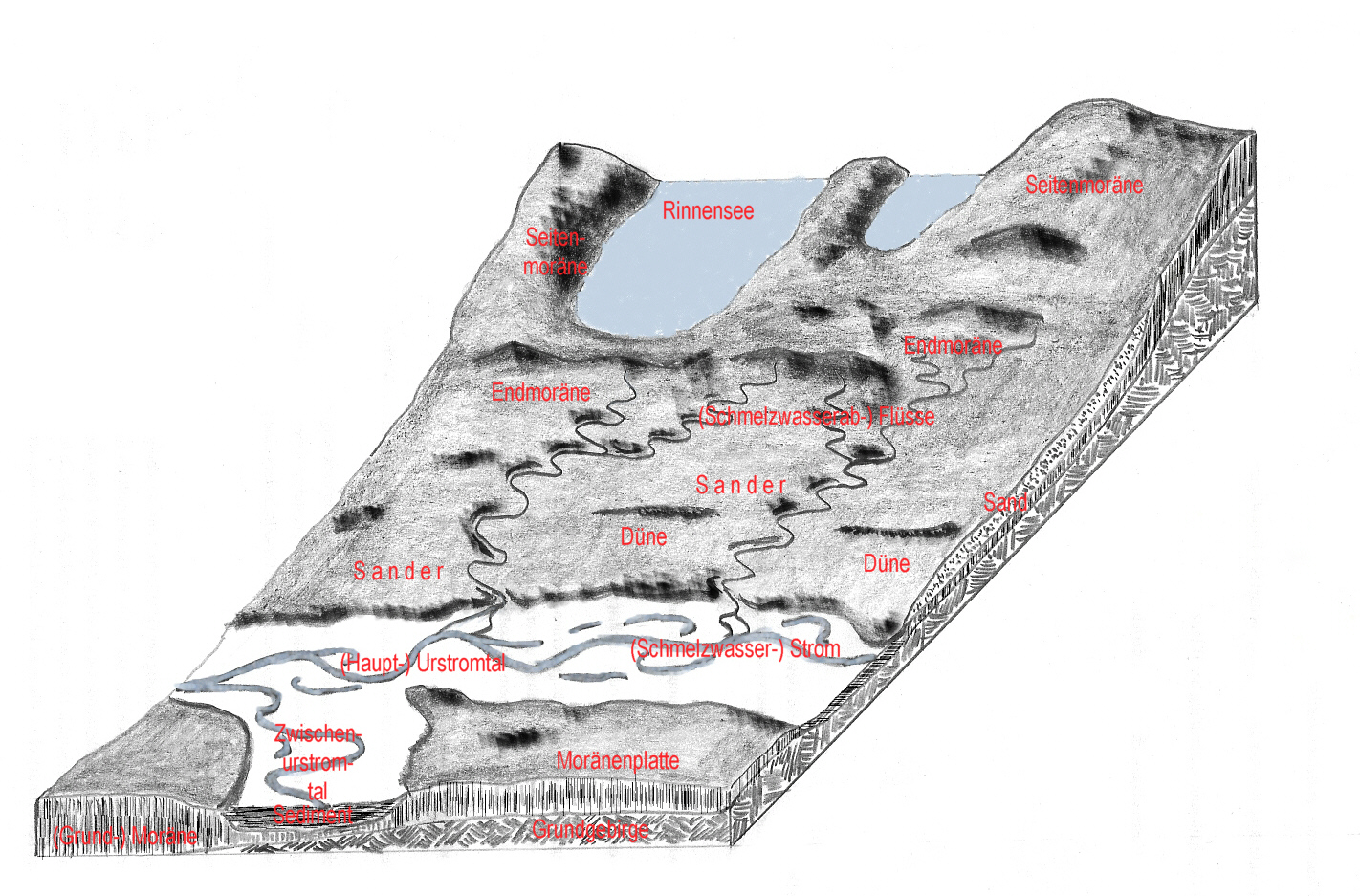
Following glaciation (schematic representation)

The Alpine glaciers, that formed a network of ice streams during the high points of the ice ages, repeatedly flowed beyond the boundary of the Alps and advanced into the Alpine Foreland. There they formed vast foreland glaciers. In this Alpine Foreland glaciation, Penck identified a number of landforms: the ground moraines, the Zungenbecken, the terminal moraines and the gravel plains in front of them.

The bowl-shaped basins, which were formed by the scouring of the ground by the glacier, were called Zungenbecken ("tongue basins"), because the tongue or snout of the glacier was once located here. In these basins, if there was no outlet, glacial lakes (Gletscherrandseen or Zungenbeckenstauseen) were formed during the retreat of the glacier. There is a number of lakes of this type in the Salzkammergut, for example. Typical landforms within the Zungenbecken of the Alpine Foreland are drumlins, but there are rarely any tunnel valleys. Around the Zungenbecken on the edge of the former ice sheet, are ridges of glacial till known as terminal moraines.

Till is the material that makes up ground, lateral and (not always present) medial moraines. Ground moraine consists of material that was once beneath the glacier and was transported by it and deposited across wide areas of the former glacier bed. The lateral moraines comprise that eroded material which is carried along at the sides of a glacier. A lateral moraine that is no longer being actively added to with glacial material because the glacier has retreated for climatic reasons, is known as a flank moraine. In the Alps the remaining flank moraines were usually formed during the Little Ice Age in medieval times. They lie several metres higher than the present glacier surface and extend far beyond the present glacier snouts. Medial moraines are formed when the lateral moraines of two glaciers are combined when they flow together.

On the far side of the morainic zone is the gravel outwash plain, which was piled up by the meltwaters of the ice mass. Those waters usually came from glacier caves whose former location is still recognisable today from the dips in the level of the terminal moraines. Often the gravel plains are markedly terraced; younger outlets have cut so-called little trumpet-shaped valleys in the older gravel plains. The material of the outwash plans is glacial till. The transport capacity of the meltwater is considerably less than that of the glacier, so that larger rocks cannot be carried out of the Zungenbecken. By contrast, elements with smaller grain size, like clays and sands can be transported much further, which is why they are rarely found in the gravel plains.

Glacial meltwater valleys or Urstromtäler emerged as a result of meltwater flowing away in a direction parallel to the edge of the ice mass and are a feature of Northern Central Europe. These valleys, created by glacial meltwaters, do not appear in the Alpine Foreland as they do, for example, in North Germany because their function was assumed by the great rivers that already existed in the region - the Danube, Rhine, Rhône and Po - or their tributaries, which transported away the meltwaters of the glaciers.

== Glacial series in Northern Central Europe ==
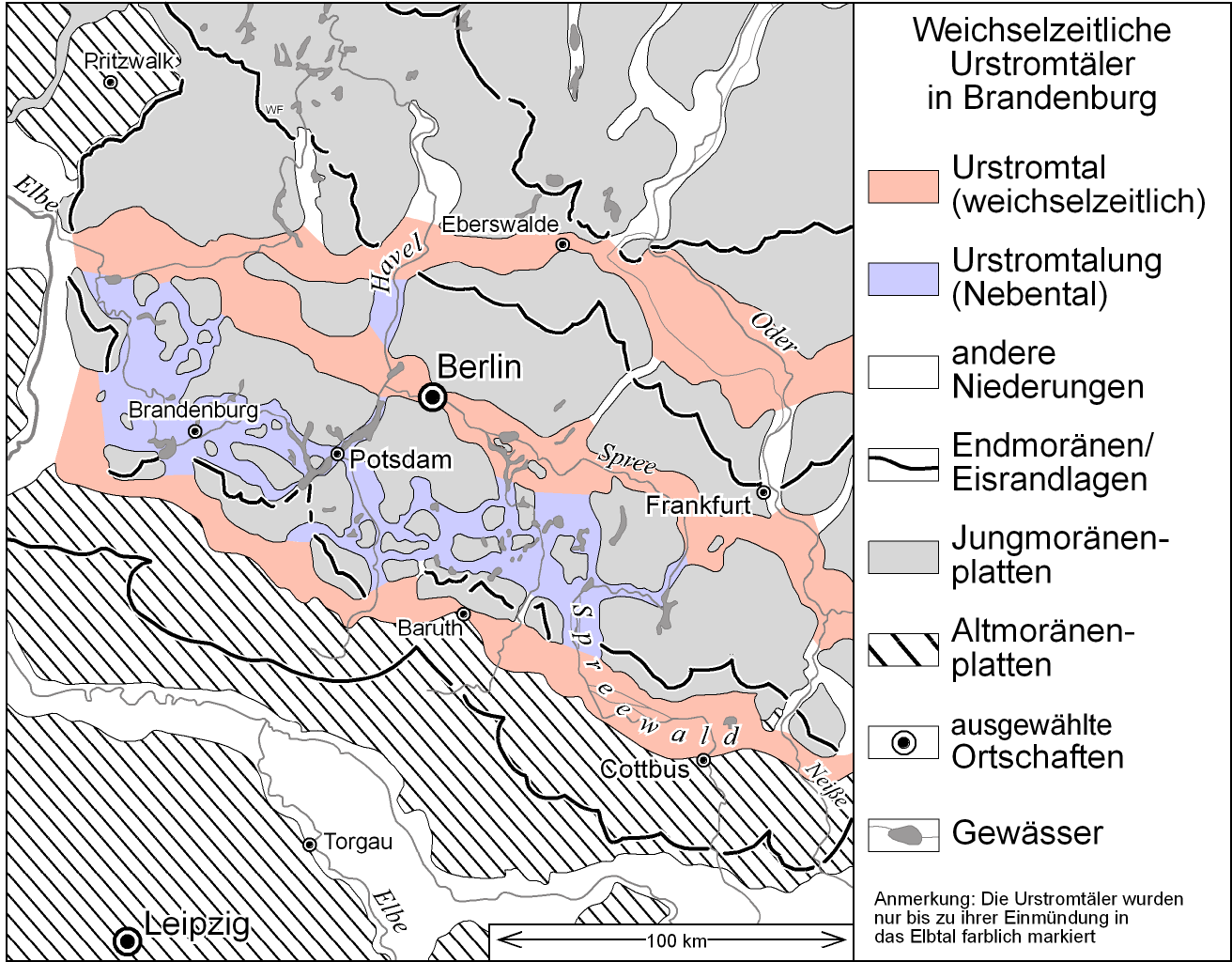
Weichselian meltwater valleys in Brandenburg

The Scandinavian ice sheet reached or crossed Northern Central Europe several times. The landforms of the glacial series here thus follow one another from north to south:

The ground moraine landscape consists predominantly in flat to gently rolling terrain, on which the ice mass deposited till. Zungenbecken, where the scouring of material played a significant role, occur to a lesser extent and are an element of the ground moraine landscape in the Scandinavian glaciation region. Because the advancing ice sheet completely buried the landscape, ice age landforms and depositions are found over much of North Germany. Tunnel valleys, by contrast, are not commonly found in Northern Central Europe.

Terminal moraines sweep in a giant arc around the ground moraine zone to the south. These terminal moraines are often incompletely formed and lower than in the Alpine Foreland, but are nevertheless clearly visible in the low-relief of the North German Plain. Because of their many gaps, the neutral term, Eisrandlage ("ice margin location") has been preferred for the line of terminal moraine ridges in North Germany.

More or less extensive sandurs border the terminal moraines. They are alluvial fans created by the glacial meltwaters. They were also fed with water that poured out of the glacier caves and cut through the terminal moraine ridges.

The meltwaters that flowed across the sandur, collected in the meltwater valley and flowed parallel to the margin of the ice sheet, mostly in a northwesterly direction. Meltwater valleys are a special landform in Northern Central Europe.

== Glacial series as a model of landscape formation ==
Like all models, the model of the glacial series gives only a simplified picture of the real situation. In particular, it is often forgotten that the landforms of the glacial series were formed almost at the same time alongside one another, whilst the ice margin remained static by the terminal moraine. Furthermore the ice then had to advance as far as the later terminal moraines and then melt away again. The processes that accompany that, clearly alter the model of the glacial series. A common variation, for example, is the spillage of younger meltwaters over older ground moraine beds.

In addition, a further advance of the glacier can result in the interlacing of various older landforms of the glacial series. For example, lines of terminal moraines lying close behind one another in the Brandenburg region of Germany drained over the same sandurs and via the same meltwater valley.

== See also ==
- Fjord lake
- Proglacial lake
- Glacial erratic
- Kame
- Esker
- Glacial valley
- Tunnel valley
- Zungenbecken, or tongue-basin

== Literature ==
- J. Ehlers: Allgemeine und historische Quartärgeologie, 358 S., Stuttgart 1994, ISBN 3-432-25911-5
- A. Penck: Die Vergletscherung der deutschen Alpen, Leipzig 1882
- Führer zur Geologie von Berlin und Brandenburg, Nr. 9, Oderbruch - Märkische Schweiz - Östlicher Barnim, Johannes H. Schroeder (ed.), Geowissenschaftler in Berlin und Brandenburg e.V., Selbstverlag Berlin, 2003, ISBN 3-928651-11-0, ISSN 0941-2980
