= Lower Bavarian Spa Triangle =

Coordinates: 48°24′N 13°12′E

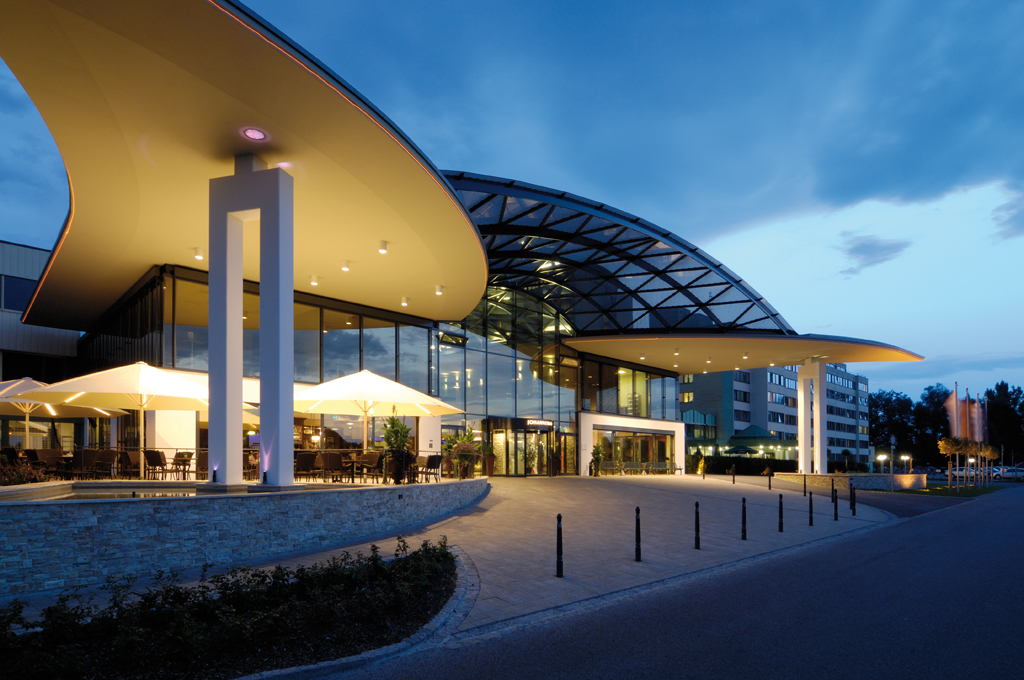
Johannesbad spa in Bad Füssing

The so-called Lower Bavarian Spa Triangle or Rott Valley Spa Triangle (German: Niederbayerisches Bäderdreieck or Rottaler Bäderdreieck) refers to the three spa towns of Bad Füssing, Bad Griesbach and Bad Birnbach in the province of Lower Bavaria in southern Germany. These health resorts are in the districts of Passau (Bad Füssing, Bad Griesbach) and Rottal-Inn (Bad Birnbach) in the Lower Rott Valley.

The name is derived from the fact that the three locations form a triangle from a geographical perspective.

== See also ==
- List of spa towns in Germany
