= Lower Bavarian Upland =

Coordinates: 48.6244°N 12.3328°E

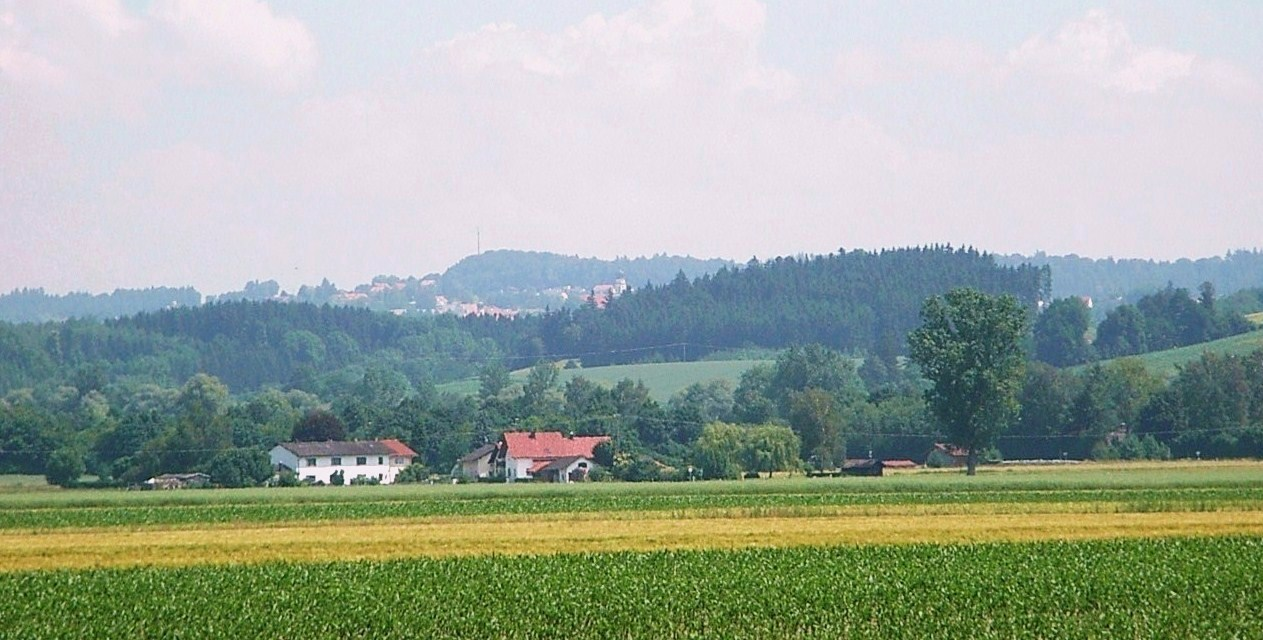
In the Lower Bavarian Hills

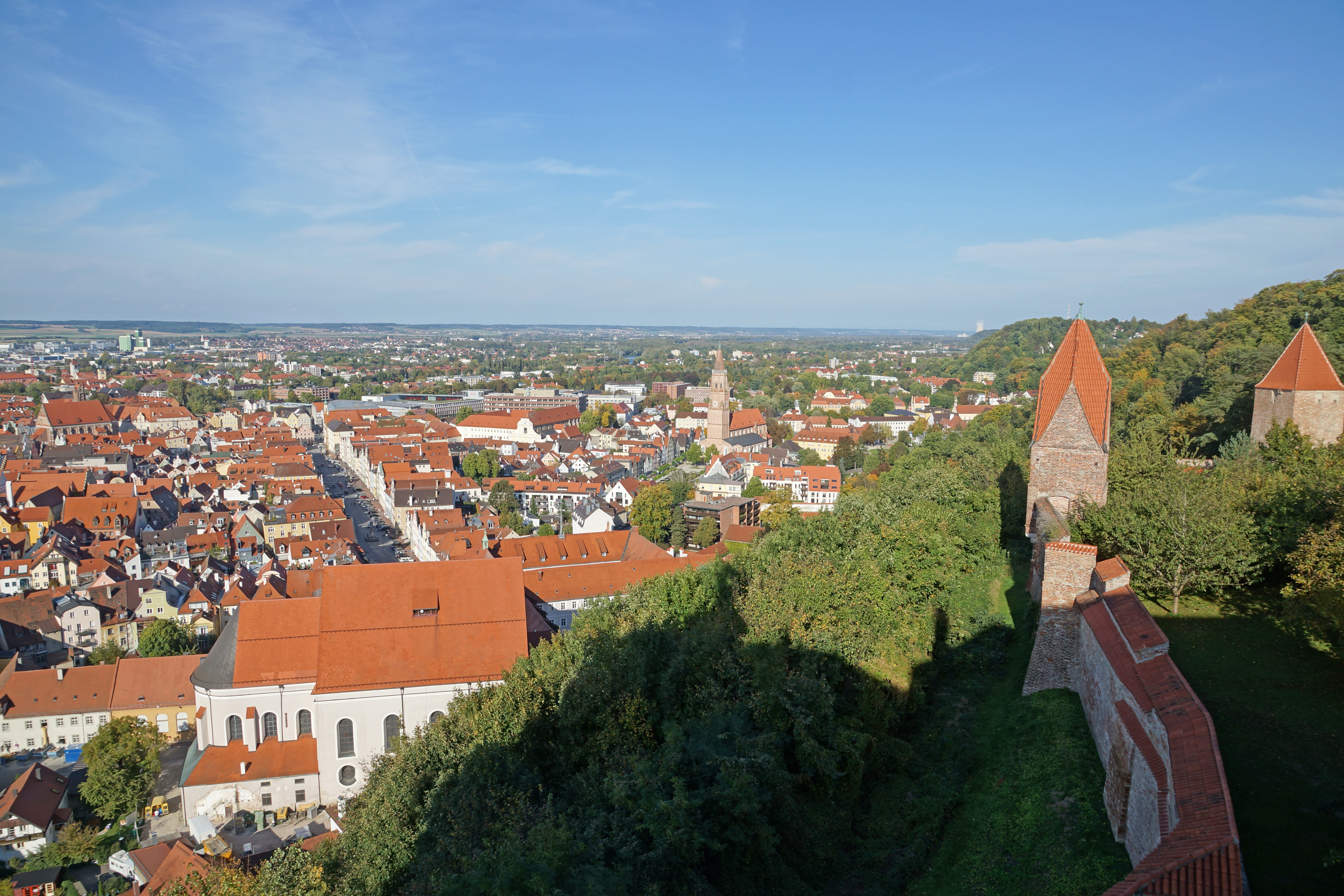
Trausnitz castle, Landshut, overlooking the Isar valley

The Lower Bavarian Upland, Lower Bavarian Hill Country (German: Niederbayerisches Hügelland) or Lower Bavarian Hills, are part of the tertiary Hügelland or hill country south of the River Danube and cover much of the land within the Bavarian province of Lower Bavaria in southern Germany. To the north it is bordered by the Gäuboden region and the Bavarian Forest; to the south by Upper Bavaria, to the east by the Lower Inn Valley and to the west by the Franconian Jura (Fränkische Alb). In the western part of the Lower Bavarian Hills lies the Hallertau, the world's largest hop-growing region. It belongs to two officially defined natural regions in Germany: the eponymous Lower Bavarian hills and the Isar-Inn Gravel Beds (Isar-Inn-Schotterplatten), and is sub-divided into the Danube-Isar Hills (Donau-Isar-Hügelland) and the Isar-Inn Upland (Isar-Inn-Hügelland) with the River Isar as the boundary. The hills continue over the border into Austria as the Upper Austrian Hills (Oberösterreichischen Hügelland).

The biggest cities in the lower Bavarian Upland are Ingolstadt, Landshut and Freising. Other larger centres of population are Landau an der Isar, Pfarrkirchen, Eggenfelden, Vilsbiburg, Bad Griesbach im Rottal, Ortenburg, Triftern, Rottenburg an der Laaber and Pfeffenhausen. The Lower Bavarian Spa Triangle (Niederbayerisches Bäderdreieck) is of particular importance for tourism.

== Sources ==
- Ulrich Pietrusky, Donatus Moosauer, Günther Michler: Niederbayern – im Fluge neu entdeckt. Verlag Morsak, Grafenau, 2. Aufl. 1982 ISBN 3-87553-135-3
