= Donauried =

River landscape around the Danube in western Bavaria, Germany

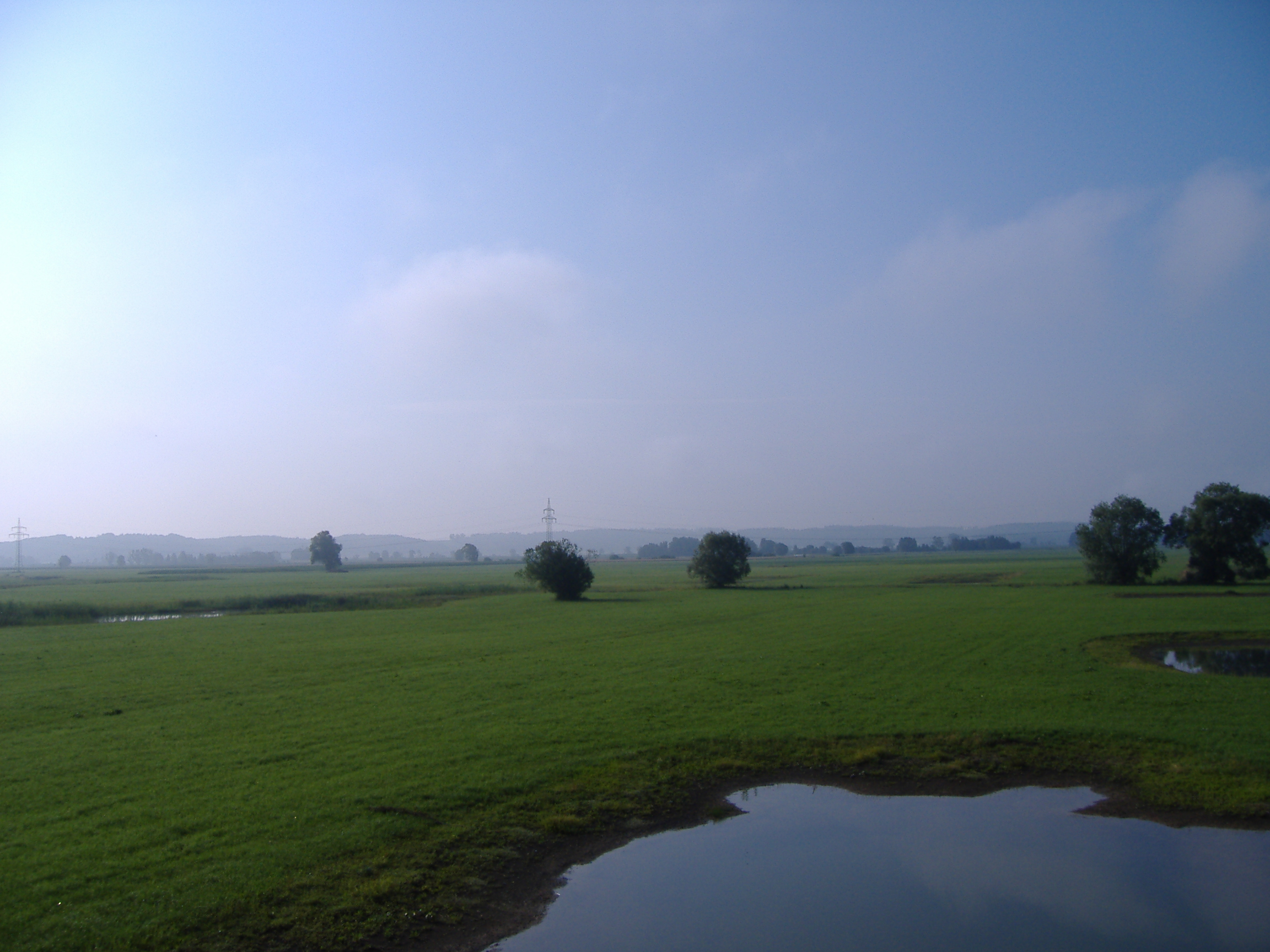
Bird reserve in eastern Donauried

The Donauried (German pronunciation: [ˈdoːnaʊ̯ˌʁiːt]) is a river landscape around the Danube in western Bavaria between Neu-Ulm and Donauwörth. Water meadow woods dominate the scene from Ulm to Lauingen. In addition, the man-made reservoirs near Faimingen, the Swabian Donaumoos between Ulm and Gundelfingen as well as the Gundelfingen park landscape in this wetland region of the Danube are of international importance under to the Ramsar Convention, the international treaty on wetlands. Birds, amphibians, dragonflies, damselflies, grasshoppers, crickets and butterflies have their habitats in the fens. Several species of plant native to the Donauried are classified as endangered on the IUCN Red List and reserves like the Apfelwörth or Eastern Donauried Bird Reserve have been established to protect the variety of species. A particular success in recent years has been the recolonisation by the white stork (Offingen, Gundelfingen, Lauingen, Höchstädt).

The former boggy plain is relatively sparsely settled, but all the more intensively used by mankind. This started with the channelization of the river between 1806 and 1867 (the Danube correction or Donaukorrektur). Its aim was the reclamation of grassland for agriculture. Dykes were later erected to prevent flooding. Between 1961 and 1984 weirs were built to provide hydropower.

The Donauried contains valuable gravel deposits of the highest quality. Gravel extraction has resulted in about 700 flooded gravel pits in the region which, in summer, attract visiting bathers from other nearbouring regions.

As a result of the rapid drainage of ground and surface water into the Danube and the river's cutting into the riverbed the groundwater level threatens to sink further. On the one hand this will enable the economic use of land. On the other hand, however, it threatens the natural landscape and the variety of species in the Donauried.

The Landeswasserversorgung, a long-distance water supplier in Baden-Württemberg, draws some of its drinking water supply from the groundwater of the Donauried.

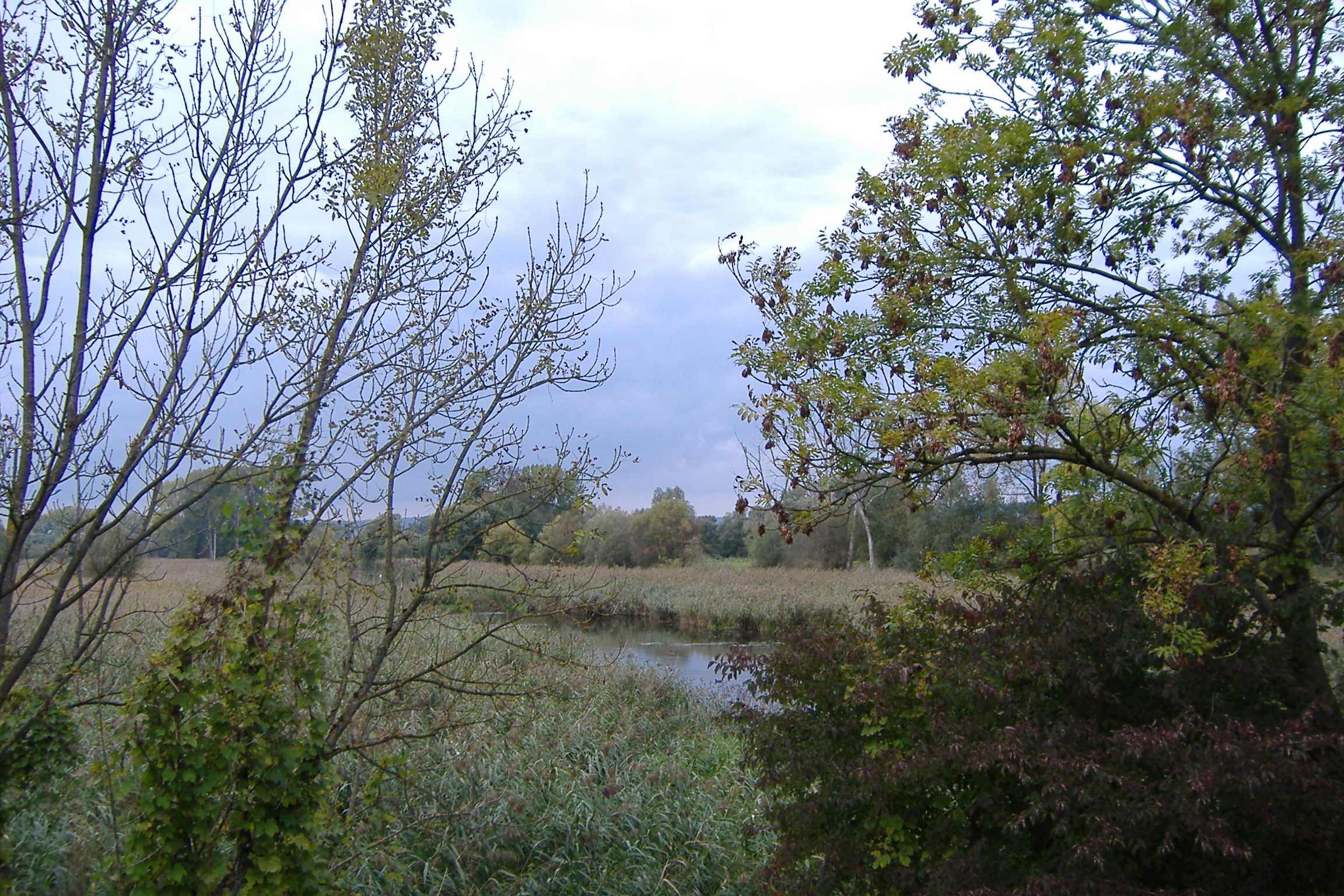
Over 70 endangered species of bird breed in the Apfelwörth Nature Reserve

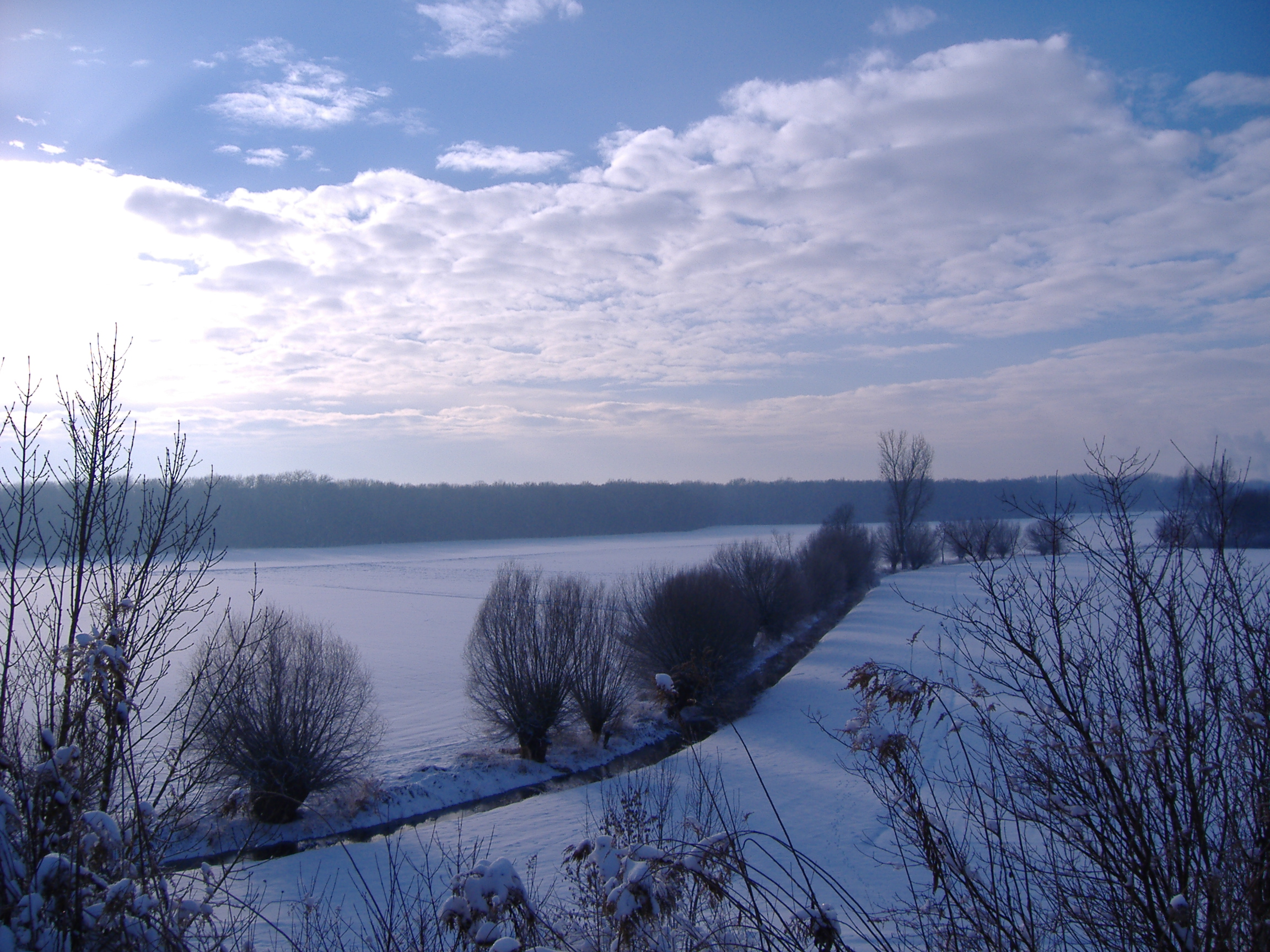
The Donauried in winter near Dillingen an der Donau

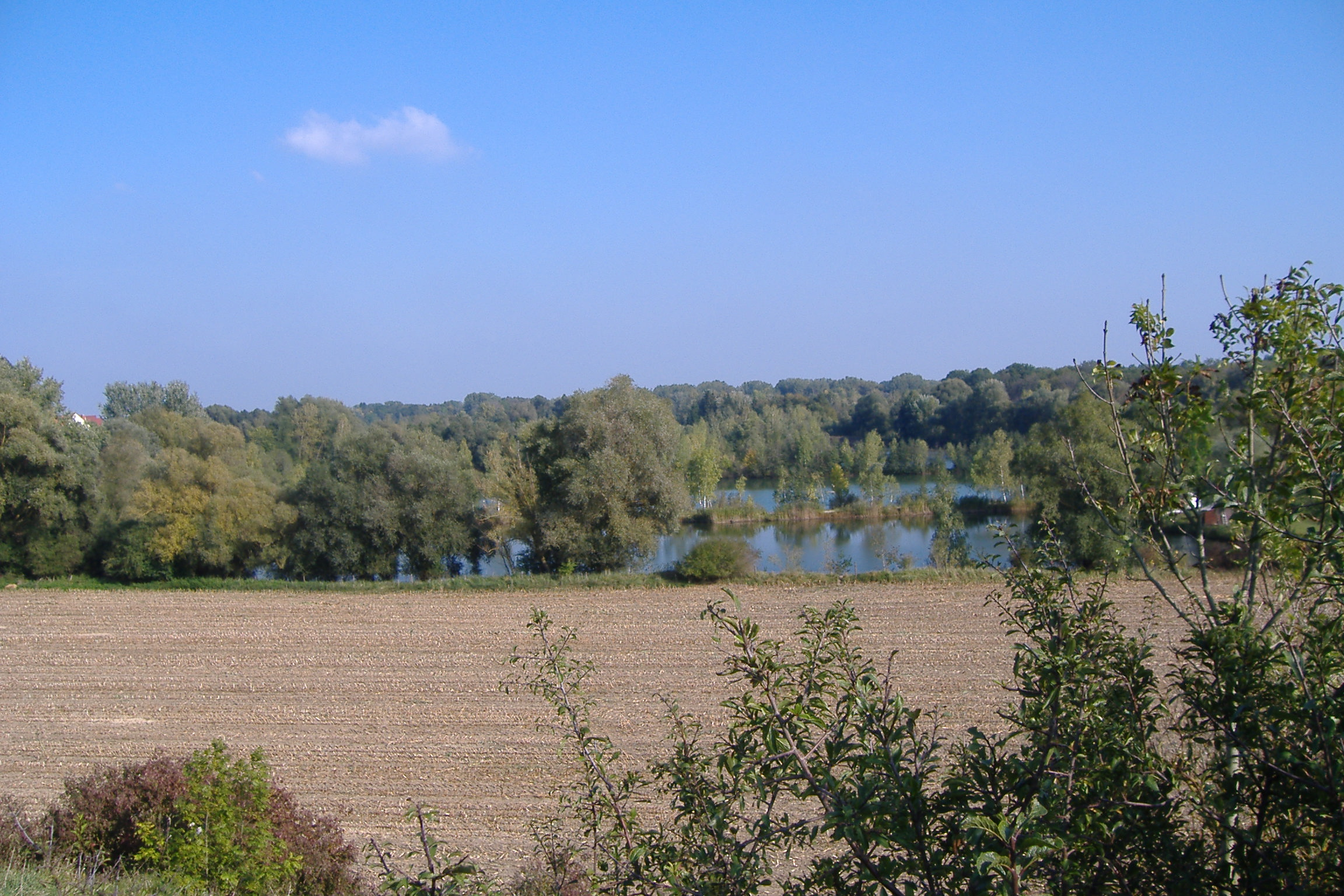
One of the many small gravel lakes in the Donauried

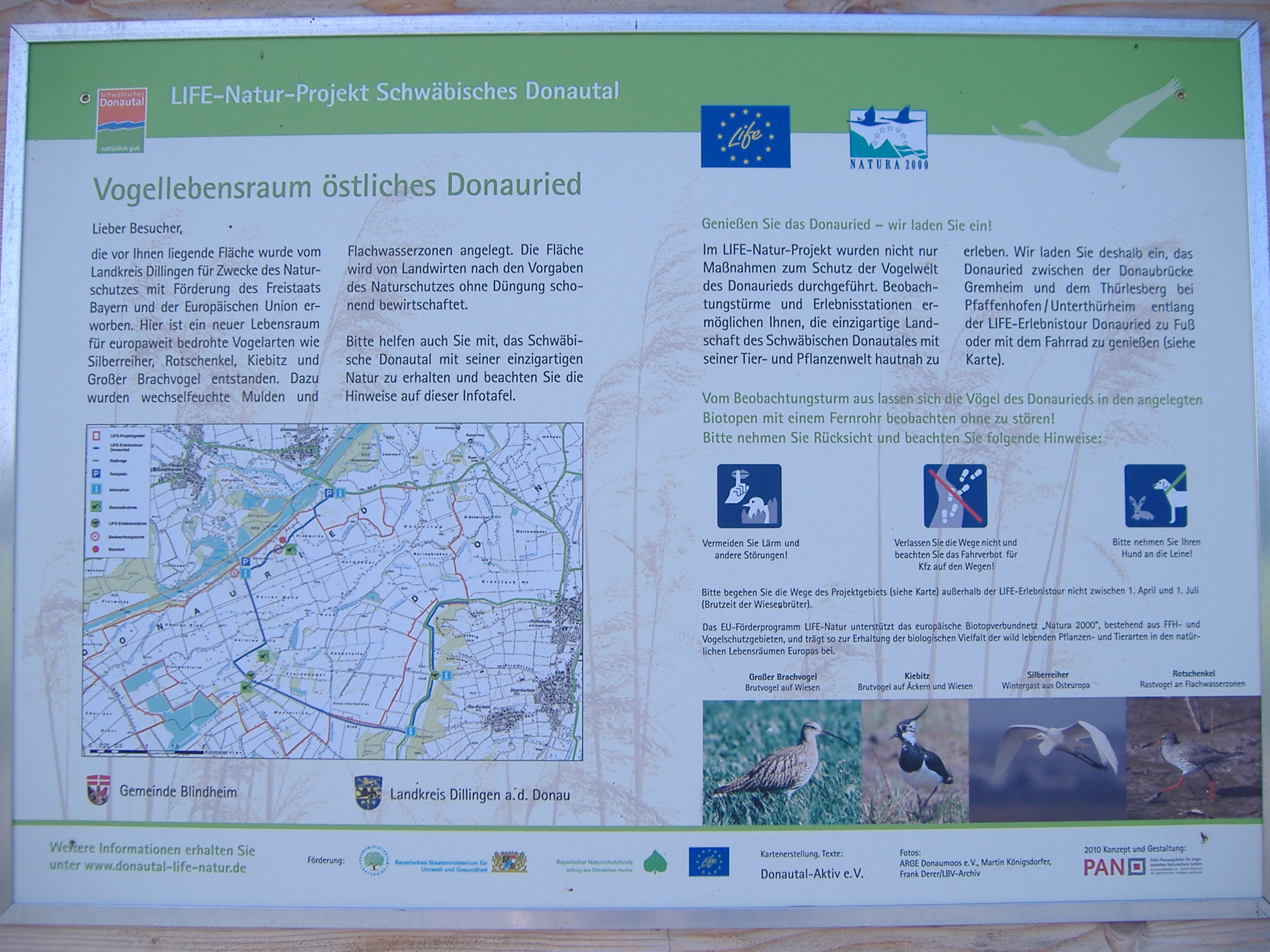
Information board at the Eastern Donauried Bird Reserve
