= Alpine Foreland =

Geographic region, Southern Germany

Coordinates: 48°N 12°E

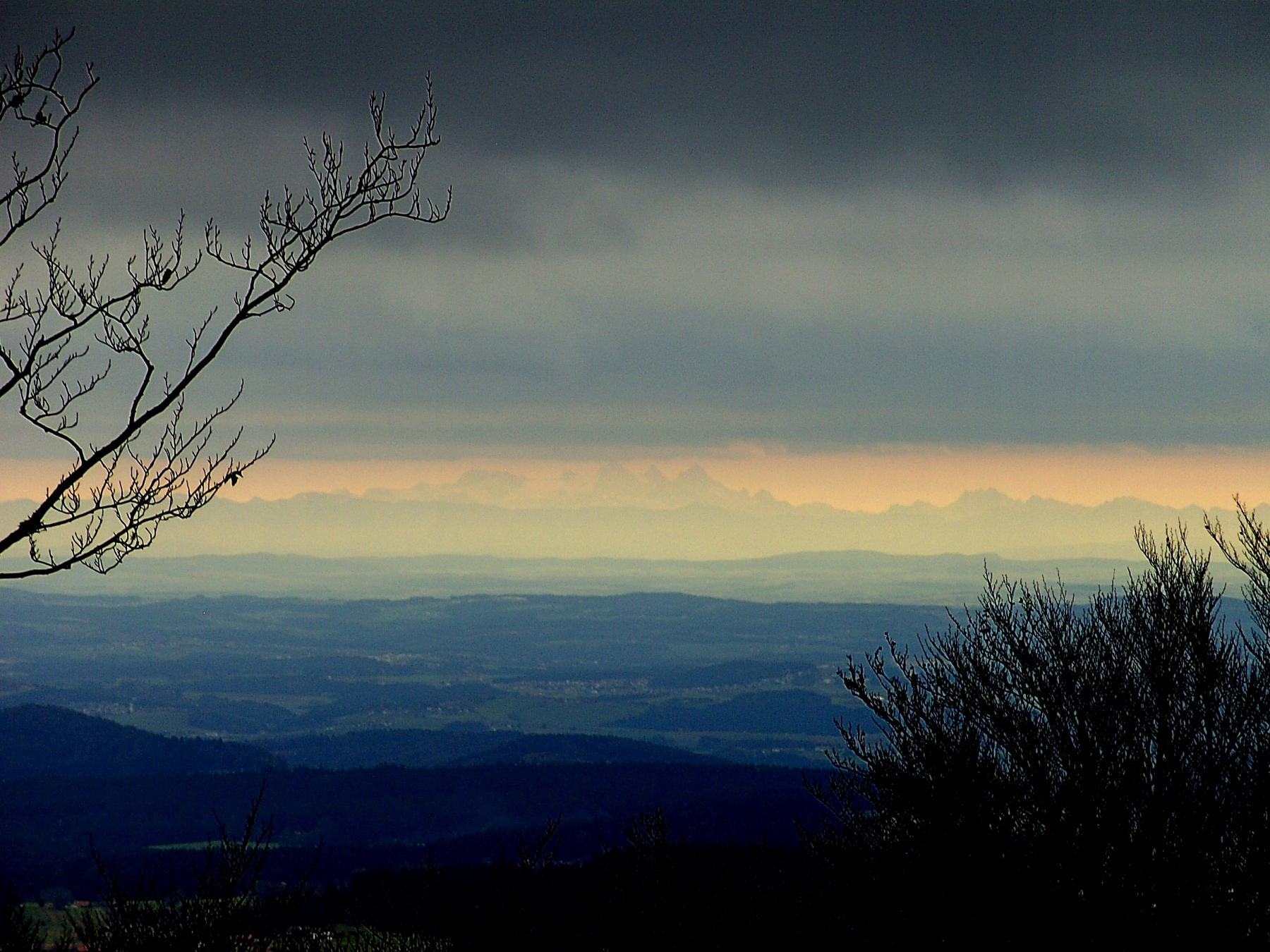
View from Mt. Lusen in the Bavarian Forest to the Dachstein massif of the Alps

The Alpine Foreland, less commonly called the Bavarian Foreland, Bavarian Plateau or Bavarian Alpine Foreland (German: Bayerisches Alpenvorland), refers to a triangular region of plateau and rolling foothills in Southern Germany, stretching from Lake Constance in the west to beyond Linz on the Danube in the east, with the Bavarian Alps forming its south boundary and the Danube its northern extent.

== Geography ==
The Alpine Foreland has been shaped under the influence of the ice ages and has a rich variety of landforms. A molasse basin of extensive Tertiary and Quaternary sediments —silt and clay, sand and sedimentary rocks from Alpine erosion— overlay the Alpine nappes. Features such as the morainic hills, gravel sandar and lakes have left a record of various glaciation stages in this region.

The Alpine Foreland is crossed by the rivers Iller, Wertach, Lech, Isar and Inn, its western boundary roughly being formed by the border of the Bavarian administrative district of Swabia with the State of Baden-Württemberg, and its eastern boundary being the Salzach river on the border with Austria. The numerous lakes include Lake Constance, Lake Starnberg and Chiemsee. The largest cities of the region are Munich, located in the centre of the Alpine Foreland on the River Isar, and Augsburg, located in the very centre of Southern Germany on the river Lech.

== Classification ==
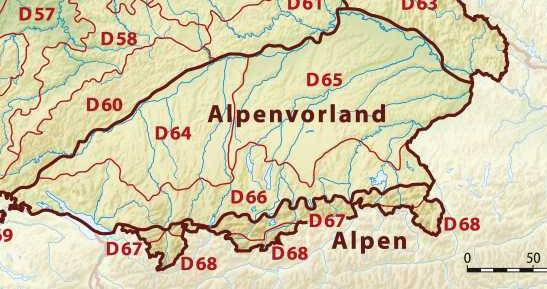
Bavarian Alpine Foreland with towns, water features and ice-age deposits

According to the Handbook of Natural Region Divisions of Germany, the Alpine Foreland is commonly subdivided into three natural regions:

- Northern Alpine Foreland:
  - Iller-Lech Plateau (D64) south of the Swabian Jura range
  - Lower Bavarian Upland (D65) south of the Franconian Jura and Bavarian Forest (Bohemian Massif)
- Southern Alpine Foreland (D66) at the foot of the Northern Limestone Alps

In the west, the Alpine Foreland stretches along the Danube up to its sources in the Black Forest and beyond Lake Constance continues as the Swiss Plateau. In the east, the Austrian Alpine Foreland comprises the Flachgau region of Salzburg, the adjacent Innviertel, Hausruckviertel and Traunviertel of Upper Austria, as well as the Mostviertel region of Lower Austria up to the Tulln Basin.

== See also ==
- Little Hungarian Plain
- Karst Plateau
