= Alexander Köcski =

Hungarian nobleman and soldier

Alexander (II) Köcski
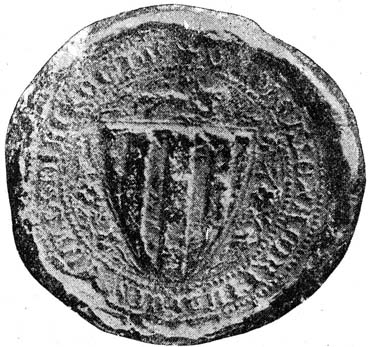
- Seal of Alexander Köcski

Judge royal
- Reign: 1324–1328
- Predecessor: Lampert Hermán
- Successor: Paul Nagymartoni
- Died: January/February 1328
- Noble family: House of Köcski
- Spouses: 1, unidentified 2, Clara Nagymartoni
- Issue: George
- Father: Alexander I Köcski
- Mother: Venis N

Alexander (II) Köcski (Hungarian: Köcski (II.) Sándor; died January or February 1328) was an influential Hungarian nobleman and soldier, who served as Judge royal from 1324 until his death.

Initially, as a familiaris and possibly distant relative of the powerful Kőszegis, he did not involve in the conflicts of civil war which characterized the Hungarian kingdom in the first two decades of the 14th century. Ultimately, he took an oath of allegiance to Charles I of Hungary in 1316, therefore his lands were plundered and many of his relatives were massacred. Following that Köcski was a dedicated military general of the king in his war against the oligarchs. He belonged to Charles's "new aristocracy", who supported the king's efforts to restore royal power after half a century of feudal anarchy.

== Family ==
According to his 19th-century biographer Antal Pór, Alexander Köcski was born into a family of castle warrior origin, which resided in Köcsk, Vas County. For their military service, King Ladislaus IV granted nobility to the family in 1273. Based on Alexander's seal, the Köcski family was presumably related to the local powerful Kőszegi family, and was also a scion of the gens (clan) Héder, at least from maternal side. Historian Pál Engel, however, considered that Alexander Köcski individually adopted his seal following his decisive victory over his ardent enemies, the Kőszegis, as a prominent general in Charles' unification war against the oligarchic domains.

His parents were comes Alexander I Köcski and a certain Venis (or Venus) from an unidentified family. His father had a brother Thomas I, whose branch lived until the early 15th century. His grandmother was Domenica from the neighboring Káld. Alexander II had a sister, who married Ladislaus Nádasd, a member of his clan's Gerse branch. Their only daughter was Margaret, who married Paul Magyar, the first royal treasurer in the Kingdom of Hungary. Alexander married twice; the name of his first wife is unknown. His second spouse was Clara Nagymartoni, the daughter of Simon Nagymartoni and sister of Paul Nagymartoni, his immediate successor in the position of Judge royal. Their only known child was George, who married a noblewoman from the Szabari family, and died without heirs sometimes between 1357 and 1361.

== Military career ==
Alexander Köcski was first mentioned by contemporary records in 1309, when, near Köcsk, bought portions in Hetyesomlyó, Hetye and Peresztegalja from a local noble family. He was referred to as comes during the act. As part of the dower of his grandmother Domenica and the daughters' quarter of his mother Venis, he was granted a land in the village of Sár (near present-day Győrvár) from his maternal relative Marcellus Káldi in 1312, where he already possessed lands. It is possible that Marcellus was the maternal uncle of Köcski. According to a 1313 charter, he was involved in a long-lasting lawsuit with his cousins, Nicholas and Emeric, the sons of Marcellus over this heritage. Köcski intended to expand and unite his estates around Köcsk in order to establish a coherent lordship. In 1314, he acquired another portions in Sár, along the stream Sárvíz in the southeastern part of Vas County. His acquisitions were concentrated in the area between present-day Gersekarát and Győrvár.

During that time, he was considered a familiaris of the Kőszegi family, who de facto ruled significant parts of Transdanubia, including Vas County, independently from the royal power. Therefore, he did not participate any military campaign during the era of Interregnum, when a civil war between various claimants to the throne—Charles of Anjou, Wenceslaus of Bohemia, and Otto of Bavaria—followed Andrew's death and lasted for seven years from 1301 to 1308.

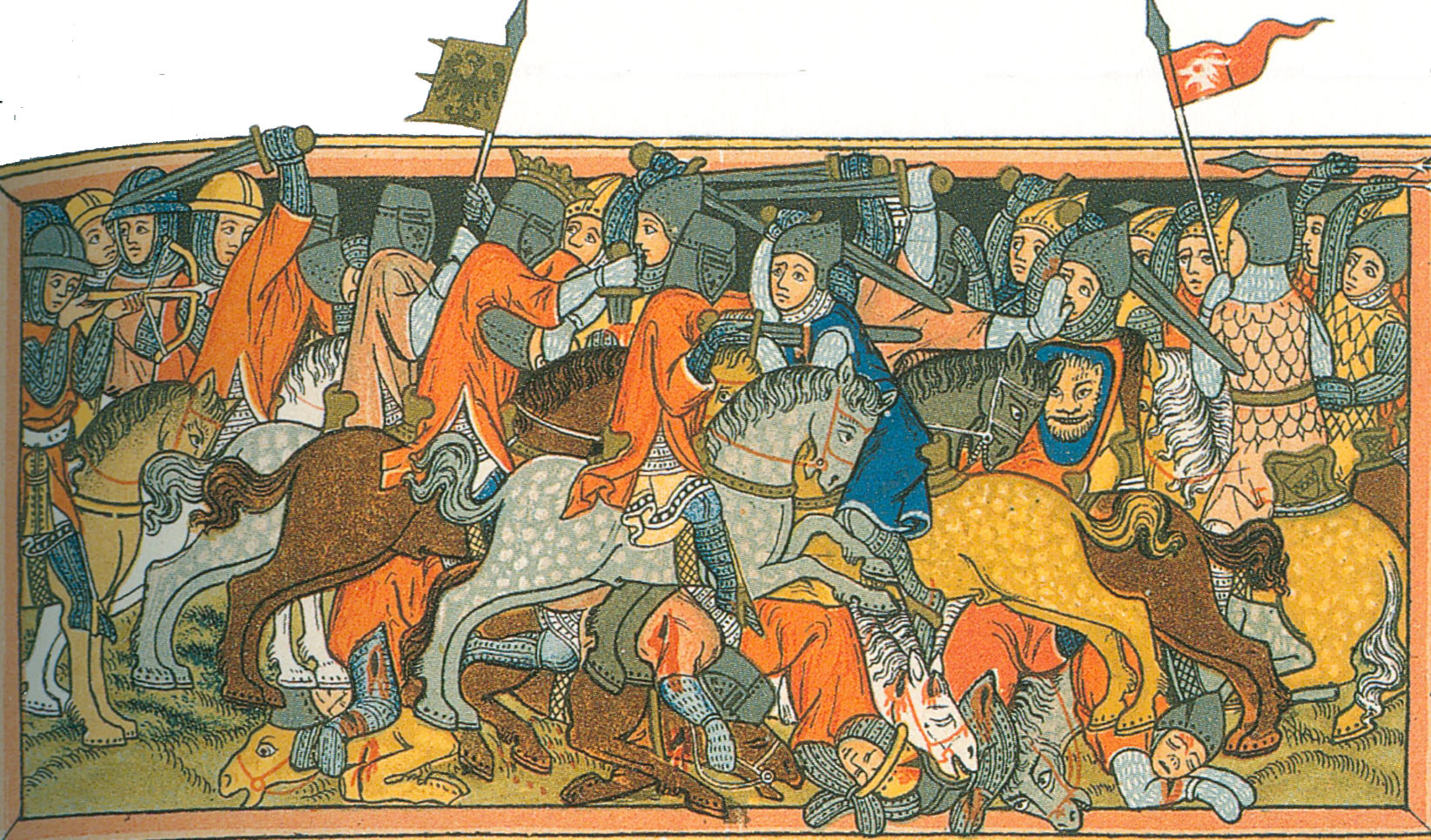
The Battle of Mühldorf on a contemporary depiction, about 1334

When Charles launched a campaign against the Kőszegis in Transdanubia and Slavonia in the first half of 1316, Köcski and his kinship took an oath of allegiance to the king. Andrew Kőszegi, the head of the family responded it with a cruel revenge: he sent his familiaris Solomon the Red with a marauding army to Gerse, where Köcski's brother-in-law Ladislaus Nádasd and his three servants were killed in the local church, which was burnt down too. Ladislaus's brother Denis barricaded himself in the manor along with his wife, Ladislaus' widow (i.e. Köcski's unnamed sister) and six other relatives, including their children. The building was set on fire by the Kőszegi troops, where all but one of Köcski's relatives burned to death. Only his niece, the child Margaret managed to survive the massacre and fled the village with her nanny. In the same time, Köcski's lands and mills were also plundered and destroyed. Köcski left Vas County and joined Charles' royal army as a penniless nobleman, who thereafter could hope the recovery of lost family landholdings only from a successful restoration of the strong royal power.

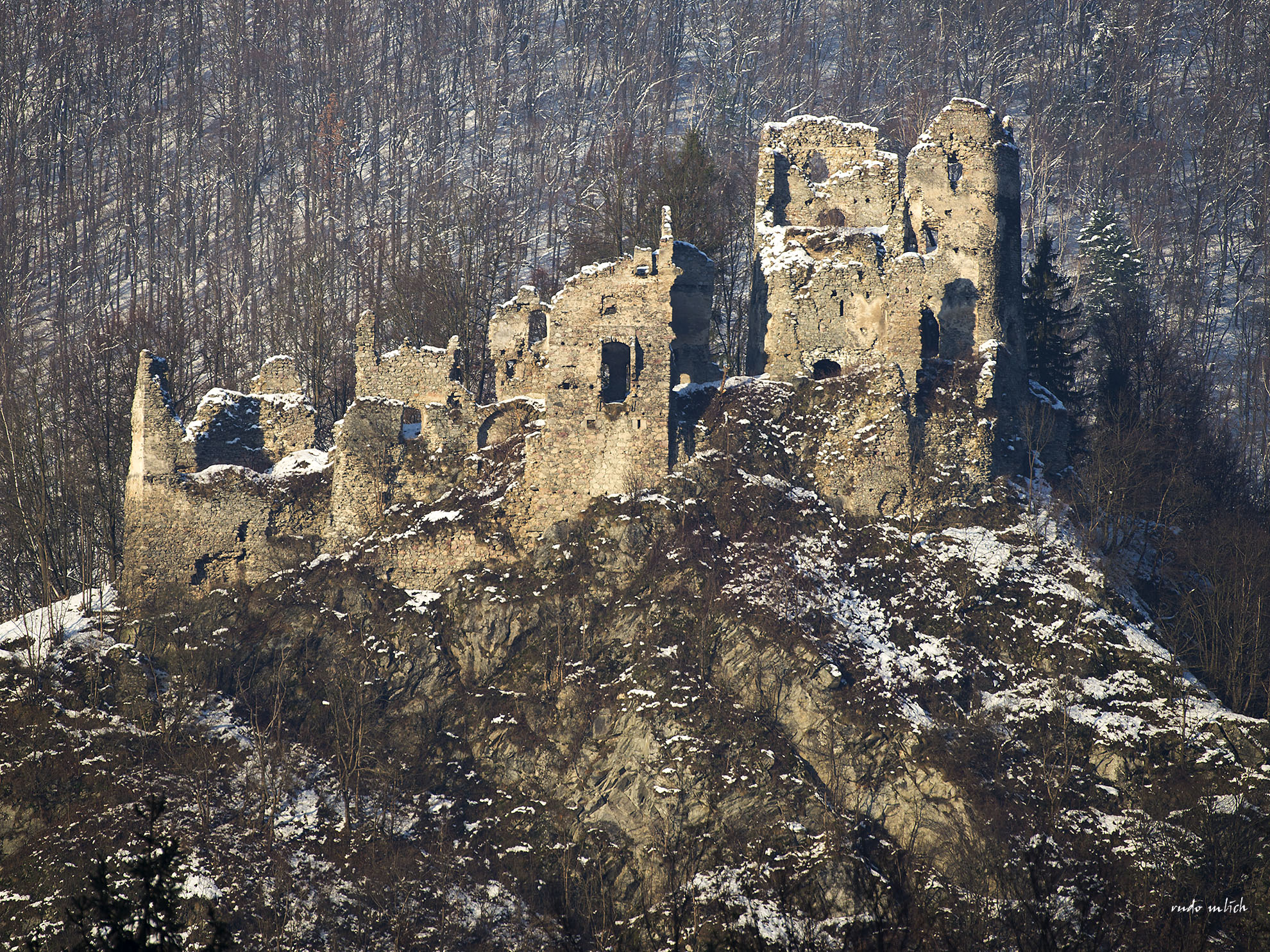
The ruins of Starhrad (Óvár), present-day Slovakia. Köcski served as its castellan from 1323 to 1324, after its recovery from Matthew Csák

When Stefan Uroš II Milutin captured the Hungarian-proxy ruler Vladislav and invaded the Syrmia, Charles I launched a counter-campaign across the river Száva and seized the fortress of Macsó (present-day Mačva, Serbia) in the winter of 1317. Köcski and his servants, the Gencsi family participated in the campaign, where Köcski was seriously injured by falling rocks during the siege. Former historiography put this campaign to the year of 1319, but Pál Engel corrected the date, distinguishing two campaigns in a direction to Syrmia. By 1318, Köcski was made castellan of Pannonhalma (or Szentmárton), following its castle was recovered from the Kőszegis in the previous year. He held the position until 1323. On 3 May 1318, when Köcski was first referred to as castellan, he was granted the lands of Sebes, Takács and Egered in Sopron and Győr counties by Charles I, as a compensation for his earlier heavy losses. 1319 was a turbulent year for Köcski; following the rebellion of Andrew Kőszegi, Alexander Köcski and Nicholas Felsőlendvai led a royal campaign against the Kőszegi dominion in the first half of 1319. Fulfilling his vengeance, Köcski seized the Kőszegis' six fortresses within months; he overcame Andrew Kőszegi's army at Szalafő, also defeating the Austrian auxiliary troops, thereafter besieged and captured the forts of Kőszeg and Kapronca (present-day Koprivnica, Croatia). During the siege of Kőszeg, Köcski was wounded by an arrow. After the fall of Andrew Kőszegi, his relative, the pro-Charles Nicholas II Kőszegi ("The Rooster") was granted the ispánates of Zala and Vas. However, by early 1321, he became disgraced too at the royal court. Alexander Köcski and Lawrence Csornai again led a royal campaign in Transdanubia. At first, they captured Pölöske. Following its fall, the army seized Kabold, Rohonc (present-day Kobersdorf and Rechnitz in Austria, respectively) and Kanizsa (from which Csornai took his new family name). It is plausible that the two generals also occupied the castles of Tátika (located near Zalaszántó) and Szigliget in the same time. Nicholas Kőszegi could retain only Léka (present-day Lockenhaus in Austria).

Köcski and other castellans, for instance Alexander Ozorai, led a Hungarian auxiliary contingent, which consisted of 2200 Hungarian cavalry and 4000 mounted Cuman archers, to support Frederick the Fair and the Austrian army in the war for the throne of Germany against his Bavarian rival Louis of Wittelsbach. In the Battle of Mühldorf, which took place on 28 September 1322, the Austrians suffered a heavy defeat, while Frederick was captured. During the battle, the Hungarian troops were neglected and sent to a secluded hill. Köcski lost only a few dozen people, while more than 1000 nobles from Austria were captured or killed. For his loyal military services in the previous campaigns, Köcski was granted Nagyécs and Pázmánd in Győr County in 1323, which act was confirmed by the cathedral chapter of Győr on 31 October, still in that year. The death of Matthew Csák in March 1321 resulted the collapse of his oligarchic domain within months. One of his unlawfully acquired castles, Várna (or Óvár, present-day Starhrad, Slovakia) in Trencsén County was returned to its original owners, the Zólyom kinship. However, Charles I took the castle back to royal property in early 1323. Following that Köcski was made castellan of the fortress, mentioned in that capacity in April 1323. Sometimes after 1321, Charles also donated the castle of Beszterce (today Považský hrad in Slovakia) to Köcski, who was first referred to its castellan in early 1324, few months before his appointment as Judge royal. Thereafter the castle was considered an income accessory (honor) to that dignity until 1382. In this capacity, Köcski was entrusted to establish a separate administrative division separating from Trencsén County. Under his control, the royal ispánate of Beszterce along the river Vág (Váh) was formed gradually in the 1320s. He hired schultheiß (soltész) officials to populate German settlers in the region.

== Judge royal ==
Following a few months period of vacancy, Köcski elevated into the position of Judge royal in the week between 26 September and 3 October 1324, replacing Lampert Hermán, who died in office in July 1324. Köcski's first known charter in that capacity was issued on 12 October. 141 documents were preserved from his tenure of three and a quarter years, which reflects the increasing professionalism of the judiciary system. In comparison, his predecessor Lampert Hermán issued 161 charters during his decade-long term. Köcski and his court resided in Visegrád, after Charles I moved his capital from Temesvár (present-day Timișoara in Romania) to the centre of his kingdom in 1323, when he defeated the last powerful oligarchs. Unlike his predecessors, he did not use the title of "magister" in his official documents. Instead, he was styled as "comes Alexander, judge of the king's court". His jurisdiction covered the entire kingdom, including its southern counties, Syrmia and Požega counties. However, his judicial competence over Transylvania had been abolished in 1324; he acted there in various lawsuit with "special royal license". For instance, he chaired an ad litem court, which made a judgment on a case of ownership of Felvinc (today Unirea, Romania) in favour of the Esztergom Chapter against the Székelys of Kézd Seat.

His deputy, the vice-judge royal was a certain Peter, son of Moch during Köcski's full term. One of his notaries was Paul Ugali, who later has elevated into higher positions and dignities in the upcoming decades. A certain Michael acted as Köcski's pristaldus (royal commissioner or "bailiff") in 1326, while Nicholas Gősfi served as a collector of the judicial fines in 1325. Köcski also participated in the works of other judicial courts. Several documents confirm that Köcski and his court established a harmonious, flexible and professional relationship with the royal chancellery. He remained a faithful confidant of Charles. He was granted the village of Pápoc and its associated lands, Csatabér and Elk by Charles in 1325. Over his newly acquired land, Köcski and his descendants were granted full jurisdiction, including ius gladii ("right of the sword") within the boundaries of his estates. Köcski donated the land of Egered to his second wife, Clara Nagymartoni in 1326. In the same year, he also donated Sár to his some relatives, and later the neighboring Mihályfölde to his familiares, the Sári family. In December 1326, he expanded his possessions of Pázmánd and Nagyécs with cultivated queenly lands. According to a summary from 1327, Köcski was a landowner in Vas, Sopron, Veszprém and Győr counties.

Continuing the method of his predecessors in the early 14th century, the usage of material evidences during the litigation processes became widespread under Köcski's term, pushing back those traditional practices of justice, like trials by ordeal and combat. By Köcski's last years as Judge royal, majority of his charters, which closed a court case, consisted method of evidence by using previously issued charters and documents. This also resulted the increased number of out-of-court settlements in these years. In many situations, Köcski ordered these out-of-court settlements for the plaintiff and defendant, who could continue the litigation after the payment of court surcharge. During the period of his operation, large-scale verdicts in high-stakes, protracted lawsuits became typical. In the structure of these, a sophisticated compacting technique of recording the court process is developed, which will also characterize the structure of judgment letters stating the final decisions in the later period of the Middle Ages. In their writing, they record with great care all the moments from the events of the trials that had an impact on the judgments, from which the final decision was basically built, at the same time, the justification of the pronounced decision, the careful compilation and formulation of the circumstances and considerations that underpin it are given more and more space in the judgment letters.

When the Babonići and the weakened Kőszegis rose up in open rebellion in 1327, Ban Mikcs Ákos and Alexander Köcski defeated them. During the military campaign, Köcski seized Sárvár, Németújvár (present-day Güssing, Austria) and two other forts in Kőszeg from the rebellious John Kőszegi. For his merits, Köcski was appointed ispán of Vas County and castellan of Sárvár in the summer of 1327. He was responsible for integrating the rest of the Kőszegi domain to the royal power. Charles provided him broad power in the redistribution of lands to the loyal local nobility and he had the mandatory of royal grace to the Kőszegis' former familiares. Köcski fell ill by mid-December 1327. He compiled his last will and testament on his deathbed in the presence of Archbishop Ladislaus Jánki, Master of the treasury Demetrius Nekcsei and Ban Mikcs Ákos. He pledged some of his lands to his orphan niece, Margaret Nádasd. His property was inherited by his only son George and cousin Nicholas. Köcski was still alive on 28 January 1328, but died by 9 February. Ten days later, Charles issued a document on the wedding and morning gift of Köcski's widow Clara Nagymartoni. The majority of his lands were ultimately possessed by Paul Magyar after series of land contracts and purchases in 1332.

== Sources ==
- Almási, Tibor (1995). "Az 1328. évi országbíróváltás okleveles adatai [Chartered Data on the 1328 Replacement in the Position of Judge Royal]". In Koszta, László (ed.). Kelet és Nyugat között: Történeti tanulmányok Kristó Gyula tiszteletére (in Hungarian). University of Szeged. pp. 19–37. ISBN 963-482-083-2.
- Almási, Tibor (2021). "Köcski Sándor királyi országbíró működésének okleveles adatai: 1324–1328 [Archival Data of the Acts of Sándor Köcski Lord Chief Justice: 1324–1328]". Forum Acta Juridica et Politica. 11 (4). University of Szeged: 5–29. ISSN 2063-2525.
- Bertényi, Iván (1976). Az országbírói intézmény története a XIV. században [History of the Institution of Judge Royal in the 14th Century] (in Hungarian). Hungarian Academy of Sciences. ISBN 963-05-0734-X.
- Engel, Pál (1988). "Az ország újraegyesítése. I. Károly küzdelmei az oligarchák ellen (1310–1323) [Reunification of the Realm. The Struggles of Charles I Against the Oligarchs (1310–1323)]". Századok (in Hungarian). 122 (1–2). Magyar Történelmi Társulat: 89–146. ISSN 0039-8098.
- Engel, Pál (1996). Magyarország világi archontológiája, 1301–1457, I. [Secular Archontology of Hungary, 1301–1457, Volume I] (in Hungarian). História, MTA Történettudományi Intézete. ISBN 963-8312-44-0.
- Markó, László (2006). A magyar állam főméltóságai Szent Istvántól napjainkig: Életrajzi Lexikon [Great Officers of State in Hungary from King Saint Stephen to Our Days: A Biographical Encyclopedia] (in Hungarian). Helikon Kiadó. ISBN 963-547-085-1.
- Piti, Ferenc (1997). "Okleveles adatok az 1324. évi országbíróváltáshoz [Chartered Data on the 1324 Replacement in the Position of Judge Royal]". Fons (in Hungarian). 4 (2). Szentpétery Imre Történettudományi Alapítvány: 243–250. ISSN 1217-8020.
- Pór, Antal (1888). "Köcski Sándor [Alexander Köcski]". Századok (in Hungarian). 22 (9). Magyar Történelmi Társulat: 785–797. ISSN 0039-8098.
- Tóth, Ildikó (2005). "Adalékok Köcski Sándor országbírói működéséhez [Data to the Function of Alexander Köcski as Judge Royal]". In Marton, Szabolcs; Teiszler, Éva (eds.). Medievisztikai tanulmányok. A IV. Medievisztikai PhD-konferencia (Szeged, 2005. június 9–10.) előadásai (in Hungarian). University of Szeged. pp. 185–192. ISBN 963-482-758-6.

Alexander II House of Köcski Born: ? Died: 1328
Political offices
Preceded by Lampert Hermán	Judge royal 1324–1328	Succeeded by Paul Nagymartoni
