= Waldbach =

Waldbach may refer to:

- Waldbach, Styria, a former municipality in Styria, Austria
- Waldbach-Mönichwald, a municipality in Styria, Austria
- Waldbach, a former municipality, today part of Bretzfeld, Baden-Württemberg, Germany
- Waldbach (Gürzenicher Bach), a river of North Rhine-Westphalia, Germany, tributary of the Gürzenicher Bach
- Waldbach (Waldbach), tributary of the similar named river Waldbach above that is a tributary of the Gürzenicher Bach
- Waldbach (Röhr), a river of North Rhine-Westphalia, Germany, tributary of the Röhr
- Waldbach (Schwalbach), a river of Hesse, Germany, tributary of the Schwalbach
