= Wechsel =

Mountain range in Austria

- (Wechsel region)
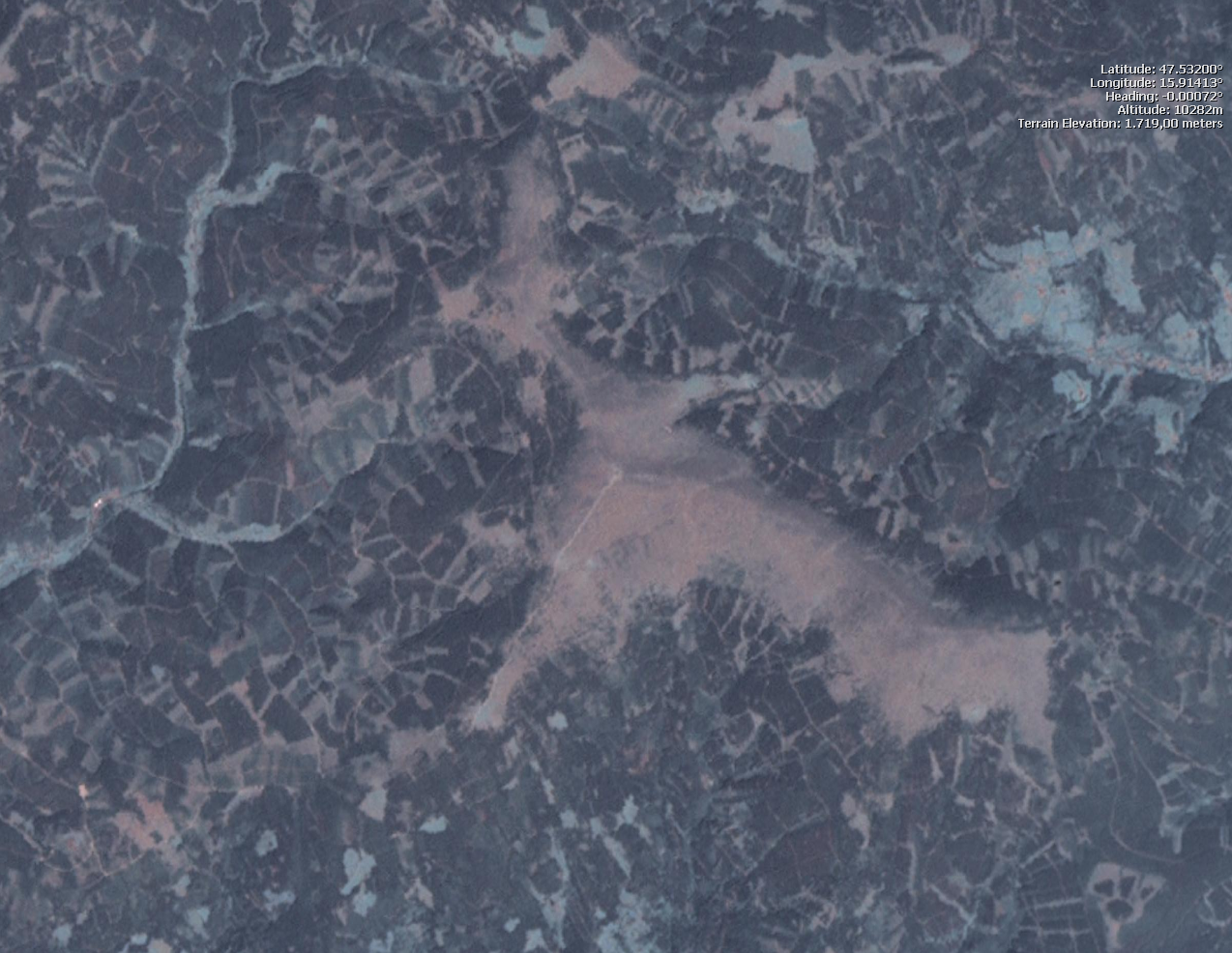
- The Wechsel region from 10,000 metres

Highest point
- Peak: Hochwechsel
- Elevation: 1,743 m above sea level (AA)
- Coordinates: 47°31′49″N 15°54′50″E

Dimensions
- Length: 15 km (9.3 mi)

Geography
- Location within Austria
- State(s): Lower Austria and Styria, Austria
- Parent range: Prealps East of the Mur (AVE) / Cetic Alps and East Styrian-Burgenland Hills (Trimmel); Eastern Alps

Geology
- Rock age: Permian/Triassic (300–200 MYA)
- Mountain type: foothills
- Rock type(s): Triassic carbonate, quartzite/quartz conglomerate, arkose slate-breccia-porphyroid-series (Wechsel slate, Alpine verrucano)

The Wechsel is a low mountain range in eastern Austria whose highest summit is the Hochwechsel (1,743 m above sea level (AA)). It also has two other summits over 1700 m. The massif forms the border between the states of Lower Austria and Styria for about 15 km, southeast of the Semmering and northeast of the Graz Basin, between the Feistritz Saddle and the eponymous pass of Wechsel.

== Geography ==
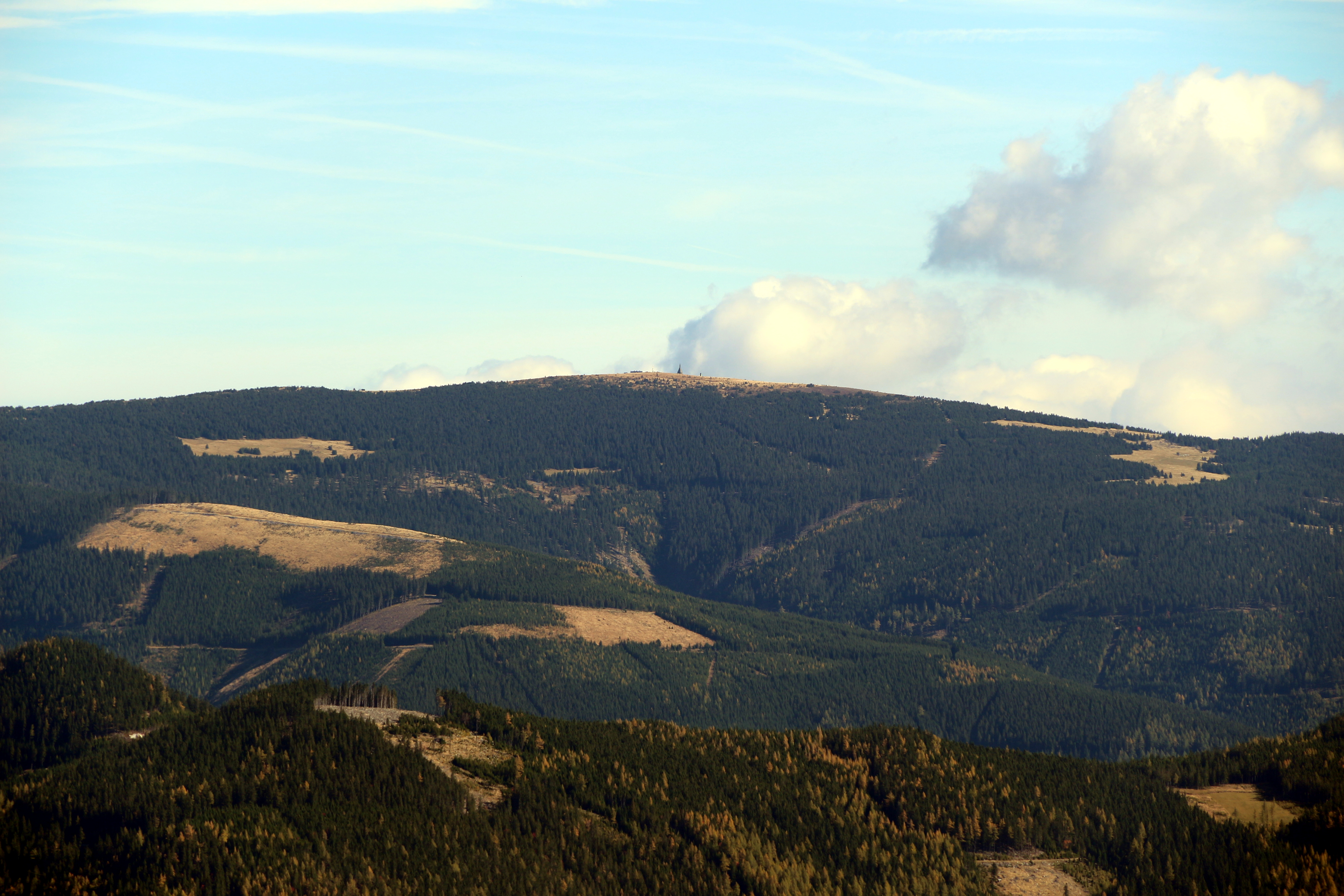
The Hochwechsel

The Wechsel is part of the Prealps East of the Mur. It is – apart from the Vienna Woods which are half the height – the easternmost range in the Alps. Its highest point, at 1,743 m above sea level (AA), is the Hochwechsel, formerly called the Hoher Umschuss, at the top of which is the Wetterkoglerhaus, an Alpine Club hut belonging to the Austrian Alpine Club. From there the crest of the mountains runs northwest to the Umschußriegel (1,720 m above sea level (AA),) continuing to the Schöberlriegel (1,704 m above sea level (AA)), and east to the Niederwechsel (1,669 m above sea level (AA)).

The Wechsel is the boundary between the Styrian Joglland and the Bucklige Welt, which stretches from the Vienna Basin to the extreme southeast of Lower Austria. To the east this region transitions into the Pinka valley, the Güns Mountains and the Pannonian Plain.

Important settlements at the foot of the Wechsel, which benefit from tourism associated with the mountain, are Aspang, Aspangberg-St. Peter, Dechantskirchen, Feistritz am Wechsel, Friedberg, Kirchberg am Wechsel, Mönichkirchen, Mönichwald, Pinggau, Trattenbach, Sankt Corona am Wechsel, Sankt Jakob im Walde, Sankt Lorenzen am Wechsel, Vorau, Waldbach and Wenigzell.

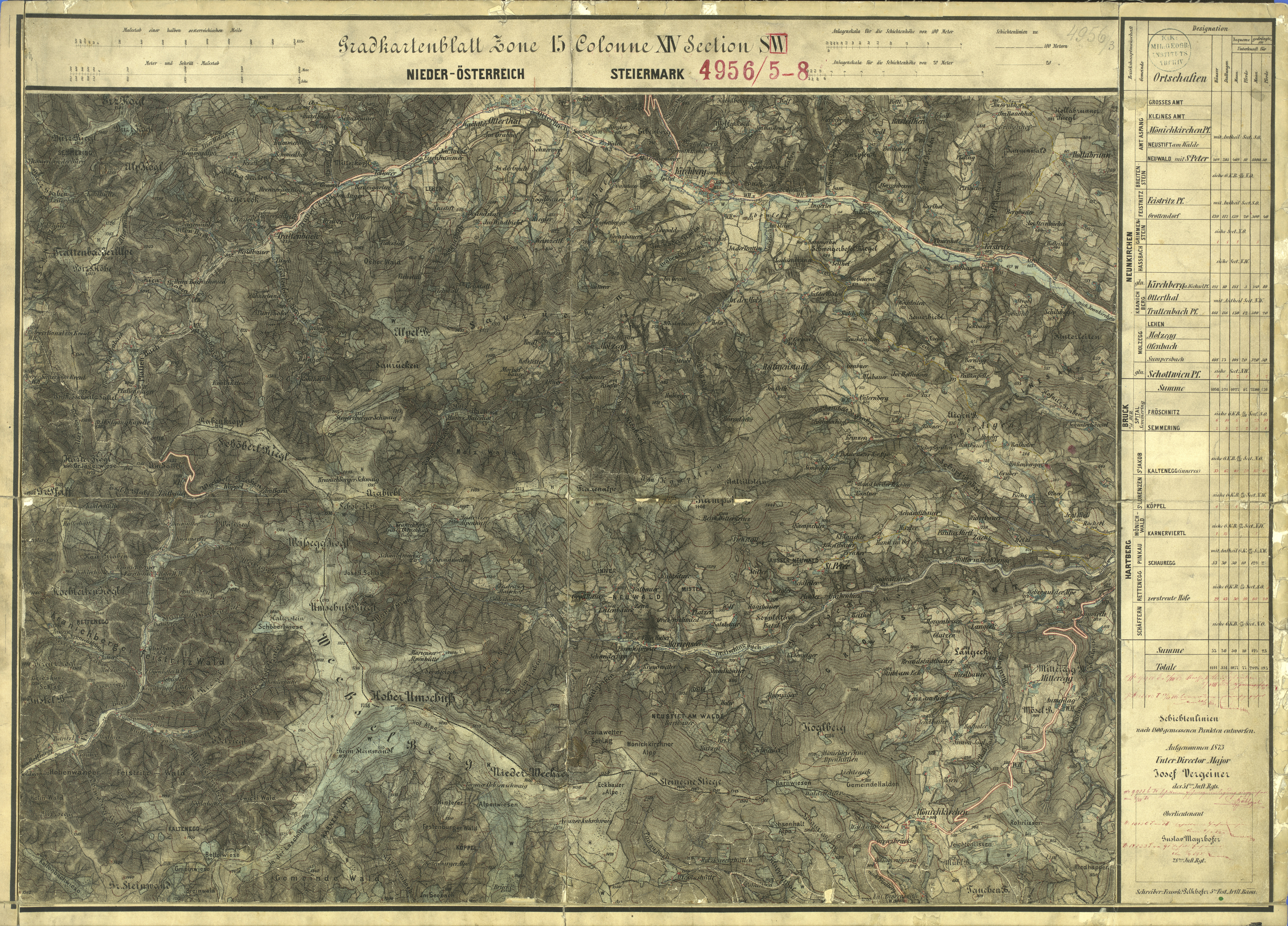
The "Hohe Umschuß" (below left) around 1873 (photograph by the Landesaufnahme)
