= Iban von Bernstein =

Hungarian-born Austrian nobleman

- Count of Borostyánkő

Ispán of Vas
- Reign: 1324–1327
- Predecessor: Andrew Kőszegi
- Successor: Alexander Köcski
- Native name: Kőszegi "Farkas" János
- Born: 1300s
- Died: after 1382
- Noble family: House of Kőszegi cadet branch: House of Bernstein
- Spouses: 1, unknown 2, Agnes von Wallsee; 3, Elsbeth von Puchheim
- Issue: (1) Heinrich (2) Johann (2) Ulrich (2) Peter (2) Anna
- Father: Ivan Kőszegi

Iban Graf von Bernstein (born John Kőszegi, also known as John the Wolf; Hungarian: Kőszegi "Farkas" János; 1300s – after 1382) was a Hungarian-born Austrian nobleman in the 14th century. He was a member of the powerful Kőszegi family, of which he became head in 1324. He launched plundering raids against both the Kingdom of Hungary and the Duchy of Austria. After his defeat and downfall in Hungary in 1327, he settled down in Styria and pledged allegiance to the House of Habsburg. Gradually integrating into the Austrian nobility, he became forefather of the Bernstein (or Pernstein) family.

== Origins ==
John the Wolf was born into the illustrious Kőszegi family as the son of the powerful oligarch Ivan Kőszegi. He was born in the 1300s, not long before the death of his elderly father (April 1308), as he first appeared in contemporary records only in 1325, and Ivan's province in Western Transdanubia was inherited by John's nephews Nicholas III, then Andrew, who were definitely older than their uncle. In September 1326, the cathedral chapter of Győr referred to him as a "young noble". John had an elder brother, Gregory (father of Nicholas III and Andrew), who died years before his birth. He also had a sister, who married a certain Dominic. In addition, John had a stepbrother from his father's extramarital affair, Nicholas (born 1282), who entered ecclesiastical career and elevated into the dignity of Bishop of Győr.

== Revolt in Hungary ==
Both Nicholas III and Andrew died without heirs, in 1314 and 1324, respectively. Von Bernstein inherited Andrew's lands, becoming head of the Kőszegi family's Ivan branch, who once governed their dominion independently of the monarch, consisting of Győr, Moson, Sopron, Vas and Zala counties and other lands, but the family was able to retain only Vas County after Andrew's failed rebellion in 1317. It is presumable that John became hereditary ispán of Vas County too after Andrew's death in 1324. John was first mentioned by a contemporary record in June 1325, when Herbord Reszneki complained that his familiaris Demetrius Balai, the castellan of Nempti invaded and pillaged his lands in Resznek days ago upon John's order. Herbord was wounded, while his brother was killed during the attack. Charles I of Hungary ordered the chapter of Vasvár in July to investigate the act of domination, but John's instigator role has not been proved. In August 1325, John issued a charter in Sárvár that he had donated the estates of Hidegség and Fertőhomok to the Blessed Virgin church of Felsőkethely (present-day Neumarkt im Tauchental, a borough of Stadtschlaining in Austria), in accordance with his nephew's will.

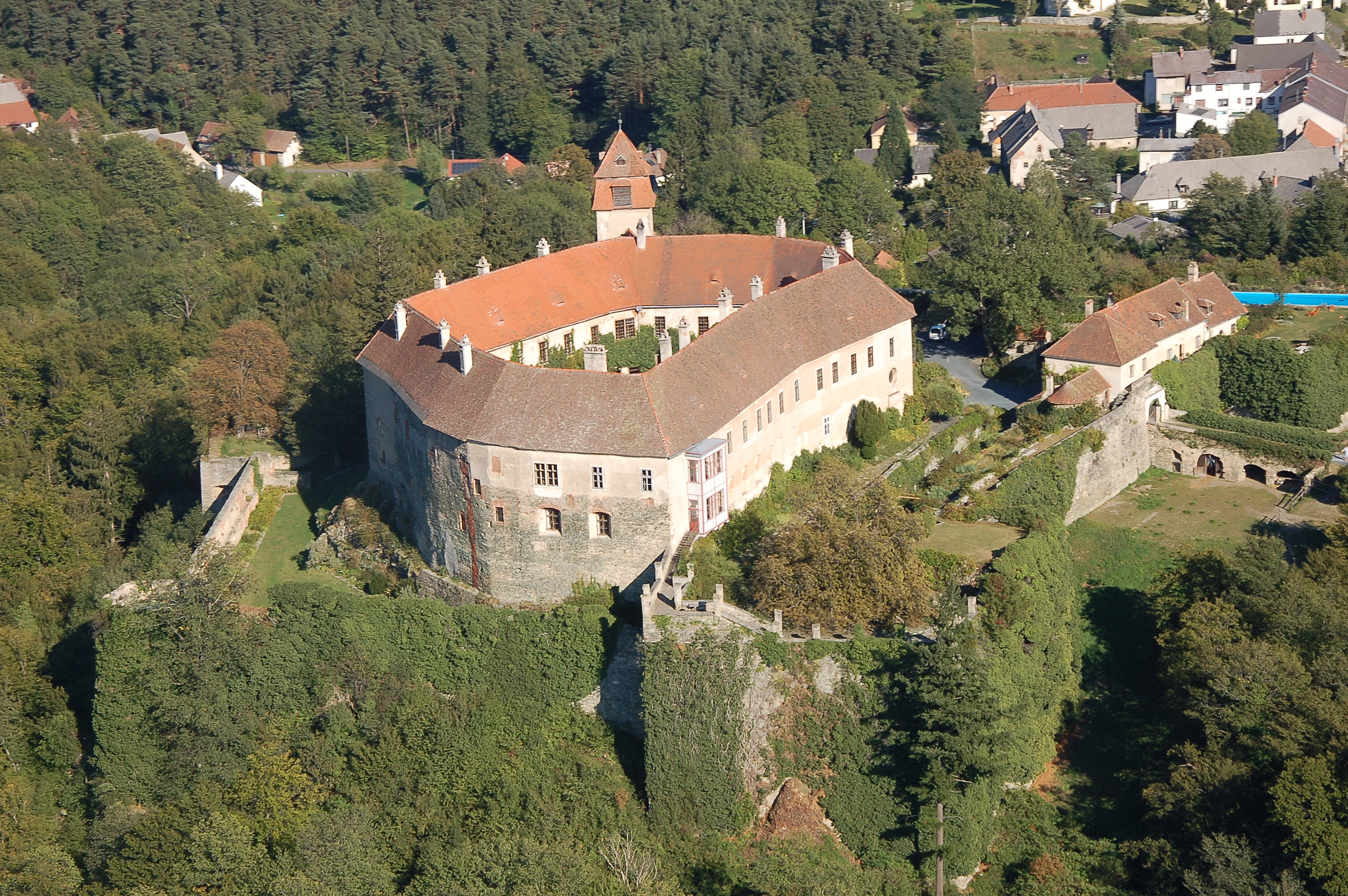
Bernstein Castle, owned by Graf Iban until 1339

Due to certain intrigues, it was revealed that John's stepbrother Bishop Nicholas Kőszegi was born when his father Ivan Kőszegi was still married. Consequently, the bishop requested Pope John XXII to exempt him from this requirement in the first half of 1325. The pope granted this exemption on 30 July. In the next year, there were reports of looting and seizures of his diocese's certain lands and estates, as well as the neighboring Diocese of Passau. Upon Kőszegi's request, Pope John placed the Diocese of Győr under the protection of the Holy See in January 1327. The pope also appointed Henry, Bishop of Veszprém as Nicholas Kőszegi's defender ("conservator") in June in order to restore benefice of the diocese. According to historian Ádám Vajk, John Kőszegi was behind the attacks against the Diocese of Győr. Accordingly, he transuded private information to the Holy See about the bishop's parentage, in order to turn him out of office, and occupied Szombathely and other bishopric estates in Vas County. Plausibly, he turned against Nicholas in connection with the open rebellion of the Kőszegis in 1327, to which the bishop refused to join.

John Kőszegi entered alliance with the Babonići and rose up in open rebellion against Charles I in 1327. However royal generals Mikcs Ákos and Alexander Köcski defeated them within months. During the military campaign, Köcski seized Sárvár, Németújvár (present-day Güssing, Austria) and two other forts in Kőszeg with surrounding villages and lands from John. Köcski was made ispán of Vas County and castellan of Sárvár, ending John's hereditary positions. The Kőszegis' dominion had disintegrated in Transdanubia, John lost all of his power and influence in the region. Charles provided Köcski broad power in the redistribution of lands to the loyal local nobility and he had the mandatory of royal grace to the Kőszegis' former familiares, of whom many left John's allegiance.

After his downfall, John was able to retain only Borostyánkő (Bernstein) and, possibly, Nempti. Bernstein became his residence and the centre of his lands thereafter. He issued his charter there in March 1333, where he was styled as "Johannes dictus Farcas" (i.e. "John the Wolf") for the first time. In the document, he returned the estate of Pózva (today a borough in Zalaegerszeg) to the sons of Kalmer Geregye, which was demolished by Ivan Kőszegi decades earlier. The Babonići and the Kőszegis, including John, made an alliance with the Dukes of Austria against Charles I in January 1336. When Charles signed a truce with his enemies on 13 December after a brief war, he called the members of the two families as the "traitors of the Holy Crown". The document put John's name in the second place among the traitors, following his cousin Peter the "Duke", but before the Babonići.

== Loyalty to the Habsburgs ==
The war between Hungary and Austria continued until 1339. Charles obliged the Kőszegis to renounce their last fortresses along the western borders of the kingdom in 1339 or 1340. John's cousins returned to the loyalty of Charles, but he chose a different path; John and his "some servants" pledged allegiance to Albert II, Duke of Austria in Hainburg in June 1339. The duke forgave them "for everything they did against his person and country" prior to this. The document referred to John as the "former" owner of Bernstein; Charles I confiscated the castle, which became a royal property thereafter. Following that contemporary Austrian documents and letters referred to him Iban (also Yban, Iwan or Vban etc.), or sometimes Johannes (Johann or Hans). He adopted the title Graf von Bernstein (also Pernstein or Pernstain) despite that he actually did not possess the fortress, which laid in the Kingdom of Hungary. His ancestry and the title of count proved him social respect in Austria, where ministerialis noble families dominated the governance, and the number of families of ancient descent had diminished by the turn of the 13th and 14th centuries.

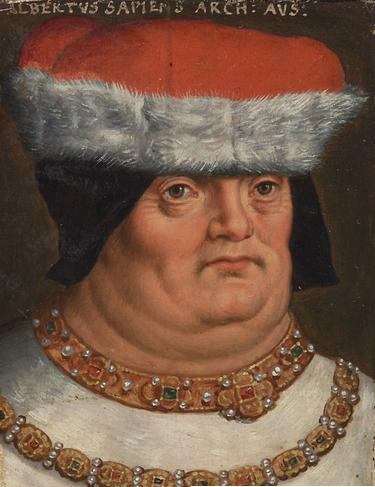
The portrait of Albert II, Duke of Austria, who granted the title of Austrian nobility to Graf Iban in 1339

Shortly after his settlement to Austria, Iban bought pledge from the revenues of the tribunal at Neunkirchen. He resided in that town, which is approximately 40 kilometers from Bernstein Castle. In the following years, he received incomes from the surrounding Kirchberg Abbey. He bought lands in Styria and Lower Austria, mostly in the region between Neunkirchen and Wiener Neustadt, along the Hungarian border. Iban married Agnes (died before 1363), the daughter of captain Eberhard V von Wallsee, which resulted his rapid integration into the Austrian nobility. He appeared as arbitrator, witnesses and countersigning noble in several legal documents, contracts and lawsuits, of which the Wallsee family were involved in the upcoming decades. Iban had at least five children. Heinrich (Henry) was born from his first marriage with an unidentified noblewoman. He was still alive in 1377. The other sons were the children of Agnes von Wallsee. Johann (John) entered ecclesiastical career, he was mentioned as vicar of the Riegersburg parish. Ulrich married Johanna von Sonnenberg. He predeceased his father sometimes between September 1381 and January 1382. During his death, he had a minor daughter, Anna. A June 1382 charter also referred to Iban's fourth son Peter as a deceased person. Iban also had a daughter Anna, who married Otto von Ehrenfels and she was still living in 1397. Before 1363, Iban married Elsbeth von Puchheim, the widow of Otto von Maissau (d. 1359).

Iban Graf von Bernstein financially supported the dukes of Habsburg for decades. The first documented loans occurred in 1340 and 1343 to Albert II, in exchange for the revenues of the tribunal at Neunkirchen. Interestingly, Iban retired from courtly service for the remaining part of the reign of Albert, who died in 1358. He was succeeded by his son, Rudolf IV, who invited Iban to the ducal council. Among other lords, Iban acted as a councillor in the lawsuit between Vienna and Wiener Neustadt over wine delivery and sale in November 1358. He appeared as a witness, when Rudolf granted the status of oppidum to Hollenburg in 1359. He also functioned in this capacity, when the duke established the St. George chapel in Enns in late 1361, after his victory over Lodovico della Torre, Patriarch of Aquileia. Iban participated in the war against Bavaria for Tyrol in 1364. Iban and his son Heinrich were also present at the foundation of the University of Vienna on 12 March 1365. Rudolf IV, who died in Italy, where prepared a second war against patriarch Lodovico, was jointly succeeded by Albert III and Leopold III. They inherited empty treasury and a lot of debt from their brother. Iban, who bought a house in Vienna, borrowed large sums to the dukes in the following years. He countersigned that document, which granted Leopold control over Tyrol, Further Austria and Carniola while income would be split between the dukes in July 1373. After the Treaty of Neuberg (1379), which determined the division of the Habsburg hereditary lands, Iban's lands in Styria belonged to Leopold's realm, while his possessions in Lower Austria was under the suzerainty of Albert. In the 1370s, Iban received several pledge lands from the dukes (for instance, Mahrenberg and Aspang castles). He was last mentioned in this capacity in July 1382, when Albert III pledged the fort of Gutenstein to Iban. In order to finance his dukes, Iban also had to apply for loans; at the end of his life he was owed to three Jewish traders in Neunkirchen.

Decades after his departure, Iban von Bernstein first visited Hungary in December 1361, when Rudolf IV and his brothers signed a treaty of alliance with Louis I of Hungary, Casimir III of Poland and Meinhard III, Count of Gorizia-Tyrol in Pressburg (present-day Bratislava in Slovakia). Iban certified the contract on behalf of Rudolf, alongside several other Austrian lords. According to a document from June 1368, Iban took out a loan from brothers Smerlein and Eberlein, two Jewish usurers in Sopron. He visited Fraknó Castle (today Forchtenstein, Austria) with Rudolf von Stadeck in December 1374. They personally guaranteed the trustworthiness of Nicholas Nagymartoni ("the German", Mertensdorfi), who pledged allegiance to Albert III and vowed that he will serve the duke faithfully with all his strength and castle against everyone but the Hungarian monarch Louis I. Nagymartoni promised neutrality in case of potential war between Austria and Hungary. Three years later, Iban also sealed that document in Vienna in which Nagymartoni promised does not offer to take shelter for those who robbing and tearing Austria. As historian Renáta Skorka analyzed, the formerly rebellious Graf Iban, who plundered and looted the borderland of the two realms several times, continuing his father's activity, became guardian and promoter of those Hungarian nobles, who entered the service of the Habsburgs, and helped maintain the lawful order in Styria and Lower Austria by the end of his life. Iban was last mentioned by contemporary records in October 1382.

== Sources ==
- Engel, Pál (1996). Magyarország világi archontológiája, 1301–1457, I. [Secular Archontology of Hungary, 1301–1457, Volume I] (in Hungarian). História, MTA Történettudományi Intézete. ISBN 963-8312-44-0.
- Skorka, Renáta (2017). "A "mohó farkas" utóda. Egy Kőszegi Habsburg-szolgálatban [The Heir of the "Greedy Wolf". A Kőszegi in the Service of the Habsburg Dukes]". Világtörténet (in Hungarian). 39 (1): 93–124. ISSN 0083-6265.
- Vajk, Ádám (2011). ""Mibe került ezen hűségi levél?" Kőszegi Miklós győri püspöksége és az országos politika ["What did this charter of loyalty cost?" The bishopric of Miklós of Kőszeg and the countrywide politics]". In Nemes, Gábor; Vajk, Ádám (eds.). In labore fructus. Jubileumi tanulmányok Győregyházmegye történetéből (in Hungarian). Győri Egyházmegyei Levéltár. pp. 411–440. ISBN 978-615-5035-01-2.

Iban (Ivan or John) House of Bernstein Cadet branch of the House of Kőszegi Born: 1300s Died: after 1382
Political offices
Preceded by Andrew Kőszegi	Ispán of Vas; 1324–1327	Succeeded by Alexander Köcski
