= Aspang-Markt =

- Municipality
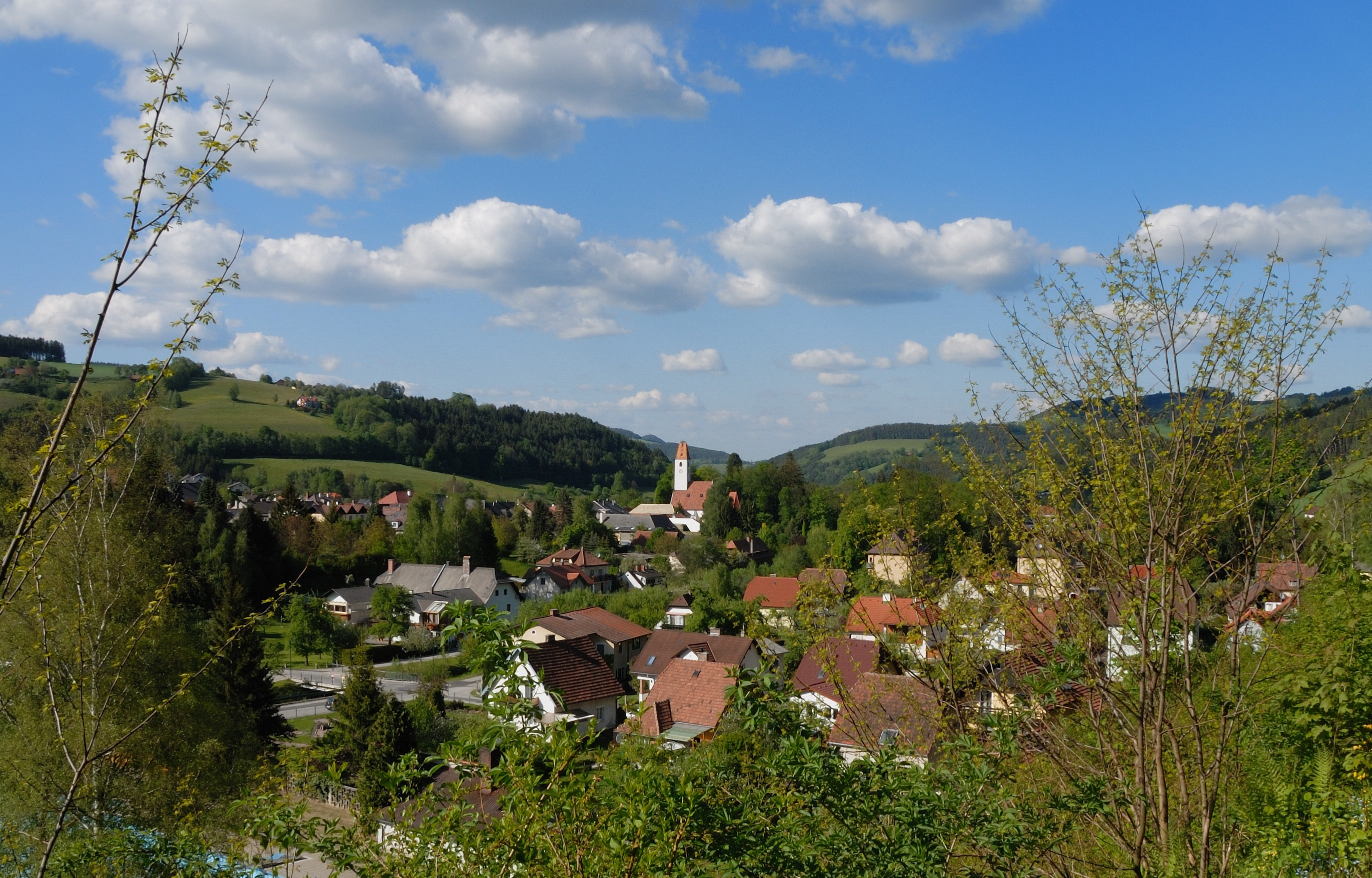

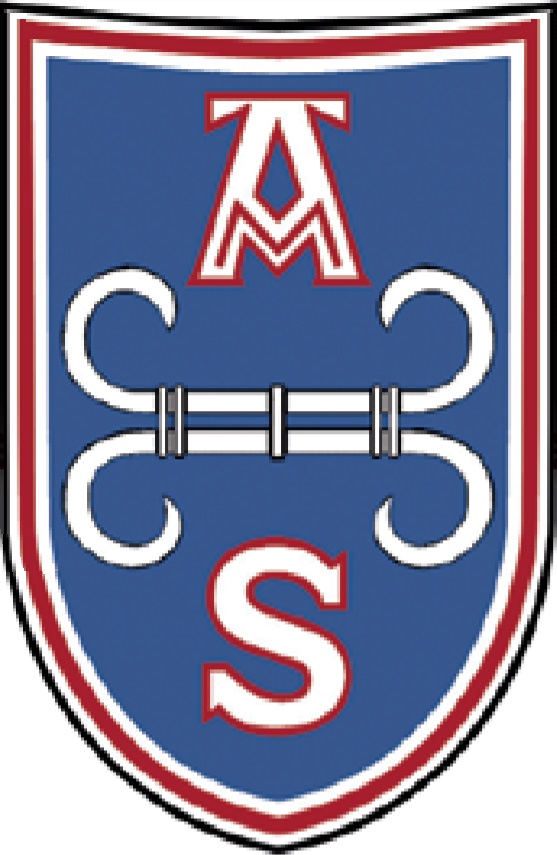
- Coat of arms

- Location within Austria
- Coordinates: 47°33′N 16°5′E
- Country: Austria
- State: Lower Austria
- District: Neunkirchen

Government
  - Mayor: Doris Faustmann (ÖVP)

Area
  - Total: 5.2 km^{2} (2.0 sq mi)
- Elevation: 498 m (1,634 ft)

Population (2018-01-01)
  - Total: 1,816
  - Density: 350/km^{2} (900/sq mi)
- Time zone: UTC+1 (CET)
  - Summer (DST): UTC+2 (CEST)
- Postal code: 2870
- Area code: 02642
- Website: www.aspangmarkt.at

Aspang-Markt is a market town in Lower Austria in Austria.

== Geography ==
Aspang-Markt is situated in the region Bucklige Welt submontane of the Wechsel mountain (1,743 m). It is completely surrounded by Aspangberg-St. Peter.

== History ==
The village was first documentary mentioned in 1220. The importance grew with the development of the road over the Wechsel Pass. It was the original southern terminus of the Aspangbahn from Vienna built in 1881.

== Population ==
Historical population
| Year | Pop. | ±% |
|---|---|---|
| 1869 | 1,021 | — |
| 1880 | 1,158 | +13.4% |
| 1890 | 1,154 | −0.3% |
| 1900 | 1,313 | +13.8% |
| 1910 | 2,105 | +60.3% |
| 1923 | 2,199 | +4.5% |
| 1934 | 2,356 | +7.1% |
| 1939 | 2,344 | −0.5% |
| 1951 | 2,518 | +7.4% |
| 1961 | 2,359 | −6.3% |
| 1971 | 2,316 | −1.8% |
| 1981 | 2,094 | −9.6% |
| 1991 | 2,041 | −2.5% |
| 2001 | 1,981 | −2.9% |
| 2011 | 1,797 | −9.3% |

== Politics ==
Of the 19 seats on the municipal council, the ÖVP has 15 and the SPÖ 4.
