= White Lady of Bernstein =

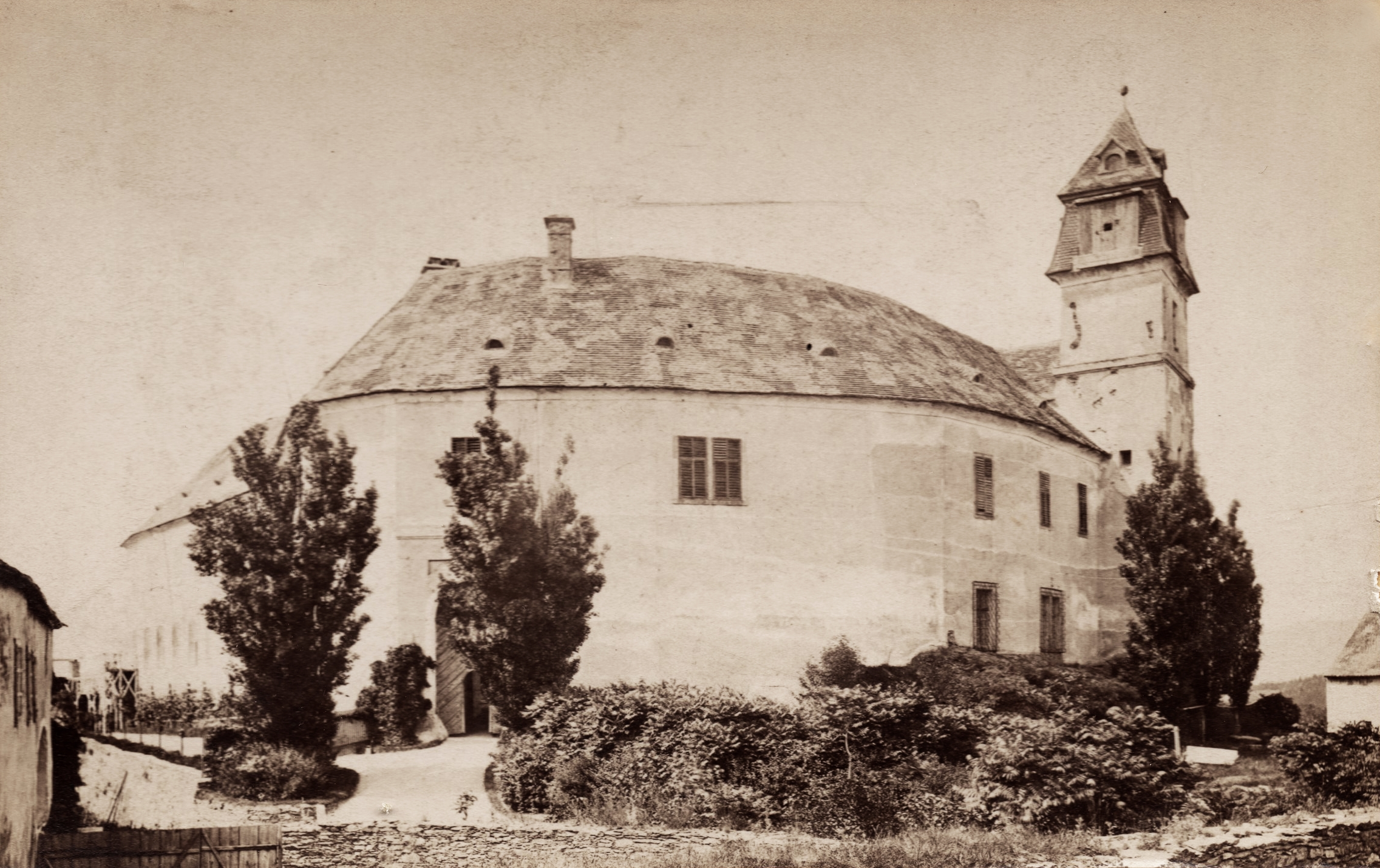
Bernstein Castle circa 1870

The White Lady of Bernstein or Weiße Frau von Bernstein is a ghost that reportedly appeared at Bernstein Castle regularly starting in 1859. In 1912, she was seen the family of the castle owner and many members of the village during the fire brigade's torchlight procession. She is said to have appeared again shortly before World War I, and finally in 1921.

The ghost was described as a glowing small, slender female figure with hair flowing over her shoulders, her eyes sadly gazing into the void, and her hands clasped together and nestled against her throat or left cheek. She wears a white veil which covers her entirely and something resembling a crown. She carries keys on a belt. She beckons people to follow her.

She usually appears in the evening and rarely in daylight. She seems to float over the staircases and hurries through the corridors of the castle. She reaches the chapel and kneels at the altar with her hands clasped in prayer, vanishing after doing so. She was reportedly seen looking down from a window into the castle courtyard. With those who saw her stating that the figure was bathed in a green glow.

Her identity is uncertain. Some claim she hides a wound in her throat with her hands, with some seeing a hilt of a stiletto protruding from it.
