= Dechantskirchen =

- Municipality
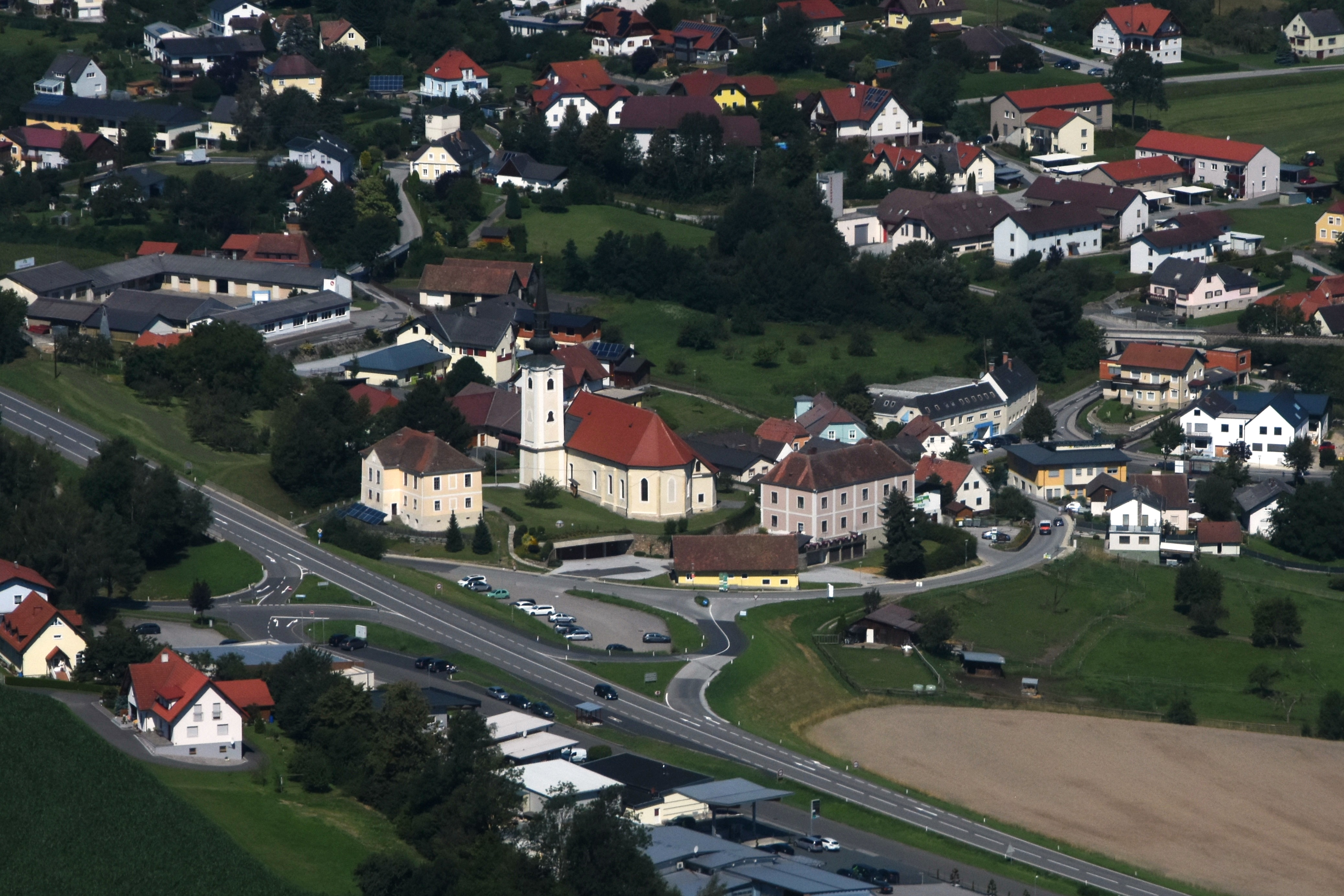

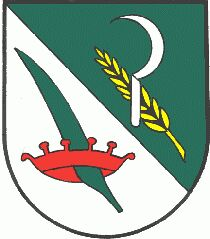
- Coat of arms

- Location within Austria
- Coordinates: 47°25′00″N 16°01′01″E
- Country: Austria
- State: Styria
- District: Hartberg-Fürstenfeld

Government
  - Mayor: Waltraud Schwammer (ÖVP)

Area
  - Total: 28.84 km^{2} (11.14 sq mi)
- Elevation: 531 m (1,742 ft)

Population (2018-01-01)
  - Total: 2,042
  - Density: 70.80/km^{2} (183.4/sq mi)
- Time zone: UTC+1 (CET)
  - Summer (DST): UTC+2 (CEST)
- Postal code: 8241
- Area code: 03339
- Vehicle registration: HF
- Website: dechantskirchen.gv.at

Dechantskirchen is a municipality in the district of Hartberg-Fürstenfeld in Styria, Austria. At 1. January 2015 it was expanded by a part (Katastralgemeinde Schlag) of the to this date existing immediate neighbor municipality Schlag bei Thalberg within the scope of the Gemeindestrukturreform.

== Geographie ==
=== Geographical position ===
Dechantskirchen is placed in the northeast of the district Hartberg-Fürstenfeld and also of Styria. The municipality resides approximately 15 km north of the district capital Hartberg. The highest place of the municipality territory is the Hochkogel (1.314 m), the moust southern one thousand mountain of the Wechsel.

=== Municipality structure ===
The municipality is composed of three Katastralgemeinden Dechantskirchen, Hohenau, Kroisbach und Schlag respectively of eight small towns (population 1. January 2019):

- Bergen (106) mit der Rotte Drei Häuser
- Burgfeld (125) mit Höttling
- Dechantskirchen (665)
- Hohenau am Wechsel (100) mit der Streusiedlung Jockl im Hof
- Kroisbach (391) mit Killer
- Limbach (25)
- Schlag bei Thalberg (390) mit Lehen und Thalberg-Siedlung
- Stögersbach (240)

=== Annexations ===
At 1. January 1967 the municipality Hohenau am Wechsel was incorporated to Dechantskirchen.

== History ==
Because of many archeological evidences, there is reason to expect that human settlement existed already in prehistoric time, like 3000 to 1500 before Christ, at the arey of Dechanstkirchen.

== Culture and sights ==
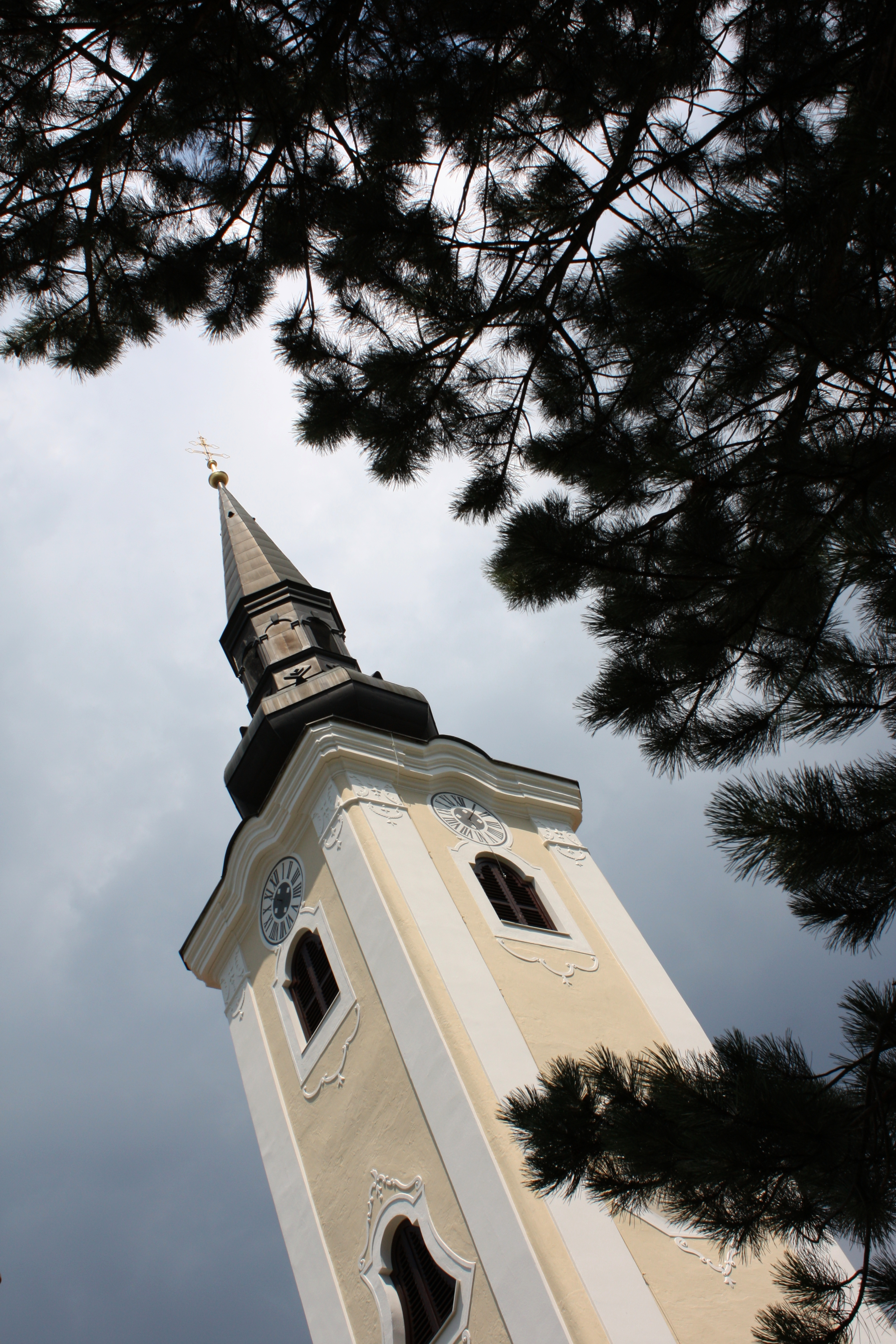
Tower of the parish church Dechantskirchen

Also look at the list of as historic protected monuments of Dechantskirchen.

- Pfarrkirche Dechantskirchen
- Burg Thalberg

== Infrastructure ==
Dechanstkirchen can be reached by train and by car. It resides at the railway track Thermenbahn and the Wechsel Straße B 54.

The airports Graz and Vienna are each around 100 km remote.
