= Waldbach (Gürzenicher Bach) =

River in Düren, Germany

Location
- Country: Germany
- State: North Rhine-Westphalia

Physical characteristics
- Mouth
  - location: Gürzenicher Bach
  - coordinates: 50.7877°N 6.4387°E

Basin features
- Progression: Gürzenicher Bach→ Rur→ Meuse→ North Sea
- Tributaries
  - left: Waldbach

Waldbach is a small river of North Rhine-Westphalia, Germany. It is 3.4 km (2.1 mi) long and is a right tributary of the Gürzenicher Bach.

== See also ==
- List of rivers of North Rhine-Westphalia
