= Köcsk =

- Coat of arms

- Location of Köcsk in Hungary
- Coordinates: 47.19265°N 17.10896°E
- Country: Hungary
- Region: Western Transdanubia
- County: Vas
- Subregion: Celldömölki
- Rank: Village

Area
  - Total: 12.58 km^{2} (4.86 sq mi)

Population (1 January 2008)
  - Total: 303
  - Density: 24.1/km^{2} (62.4/sq mi)
- Time zone: UTC+1 (CET)
  - Summer (DST): UTC+2 (CEST)
- Postal code: 9553
- Area code: +36 95
- KSH code: 04190

Köcsk is a village in Vas county, in western Hungary.
