= Mönichwald =

- Former municipality
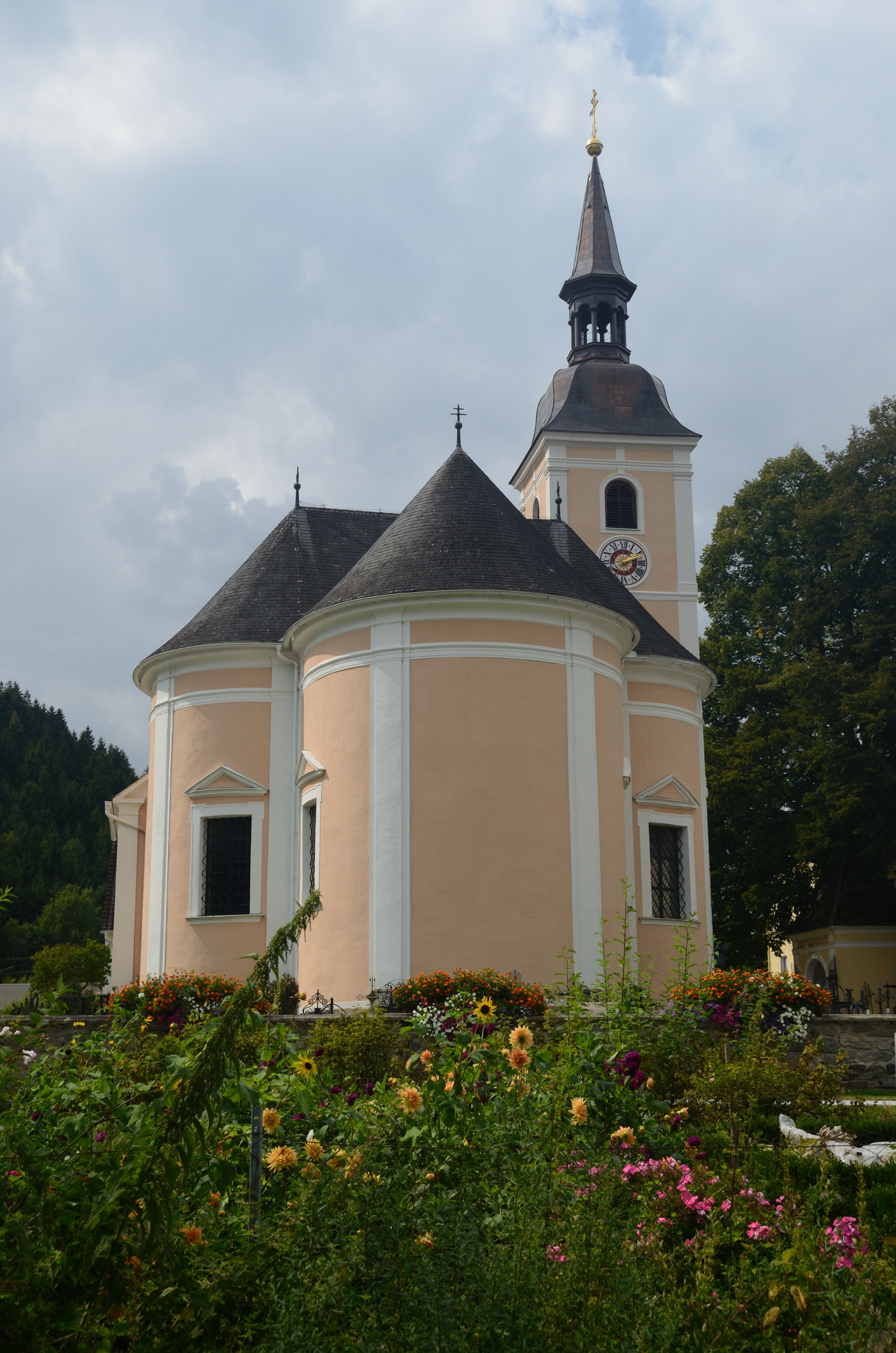
- Mönichwald parish church

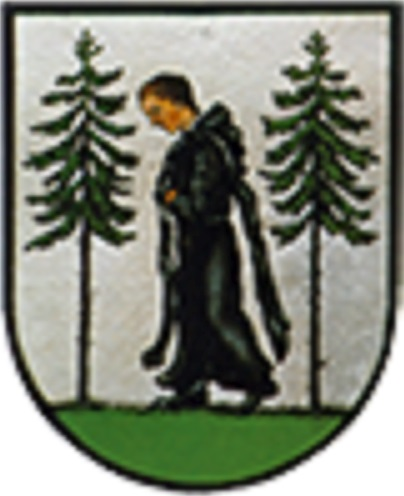
- Coat of arms

- Location within Austria
- Coordinates: 47°26′50″N 15°52′57″E
- Country: Austria
- State: Styria
- District: Hartberg-Fürstenfeld

Area
  - Total: 35.14 km^{2} (13.57 sq mi)
- Elevation: 574 m (1,883 ft)

Population (1 January 2016)
  - Total: 864
  - Density: 24.6/km^{2} (63.7/sq mi)
- Time zone: UTC+1 (CET)
  - Summer (DST): UTC+2 (CEST)
- Postal code: 8252, 8251, 8253
- Area code: 03336
- Vehicle registration: HB
- Website: www.moenichwald.at

Mönichwald is a former municipality in the district of Hartberg-Fürstenfeld in Styria, Austria. Since the 2015 Styria municipal structural reform, it is part of the municipality of Waldbach-Mönichwald.
