= Gürzenicher Bach =

River in Germany

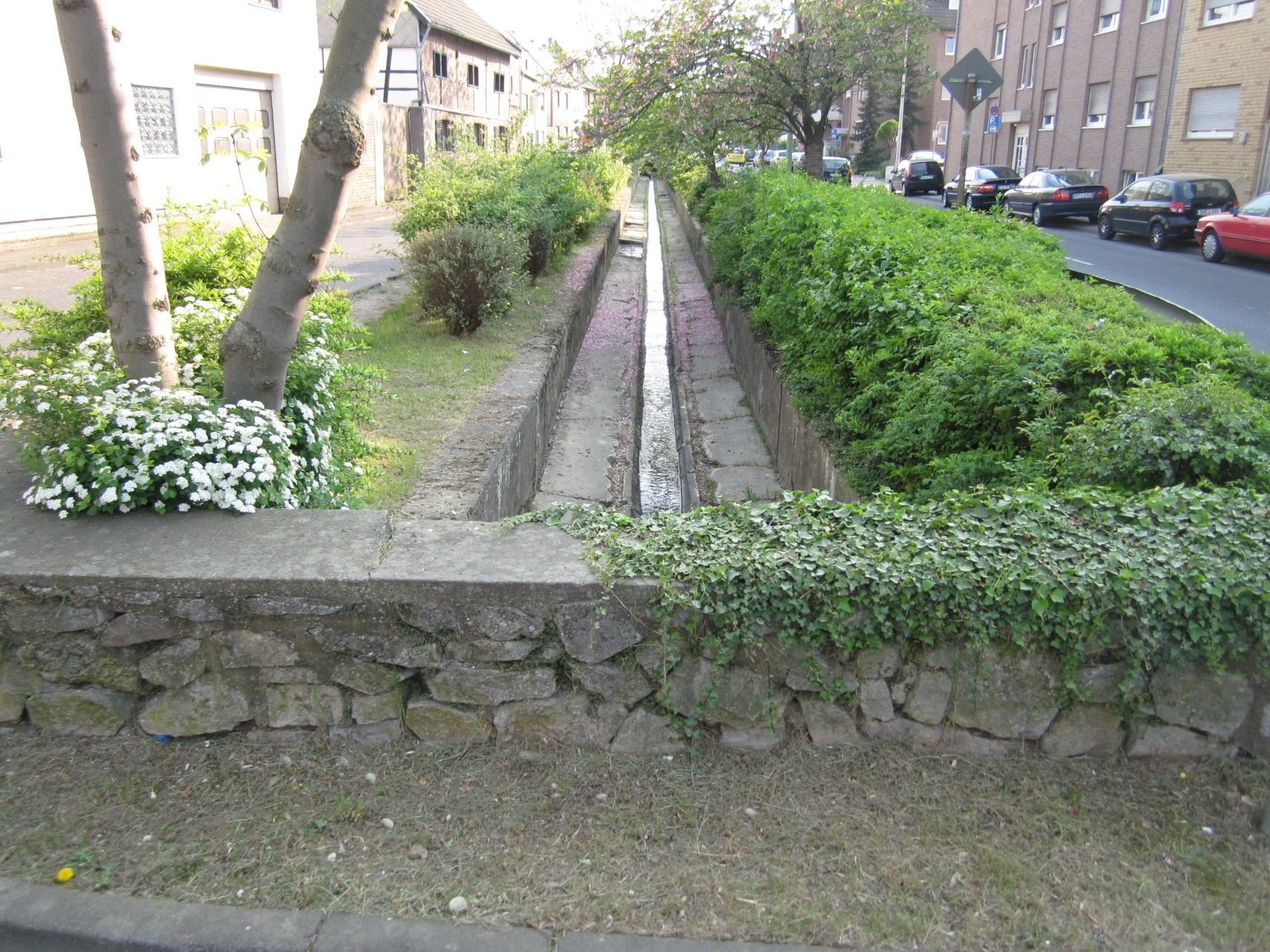

Location
- Country: Germany
- States: North Rhine-Westphalia

Physical characteristics
- Mouth
  - location: Rur
  - coordinates: 50.8081°N 6.4575°E

Basin features
- Progression: Rur→ Meuse→ North Sea

Gürzenicher Bach is a river of North Rhine-Westphalia, Germany. It flows into the Lendersdorfer Mühlenteich, a mill pond near Düren which flows into the river Rur.

== See also ==
- List of rivers of North Rhine-Westphalia
