= Écs =

- Flag Coat of arms

- Location of Győr-Moson-Sopron county in Hungary

- Location of Écs
- Coordinates: 47.55801°N 17.70534°E
- Country: Hungary
- County: Győr-Moson-Sopron

Area
  - Total: 19.83 km^{2} (7.66 sq mi)

Population (2004)
  - Total: 1,759
  - Density: 88.7/km^{2} (230/sq mi)
- Time zone: UTC+1 (CET)
  - Summer (DST): UTC+2 (CEST)
- Postal code: 9083
- Area code: 96

Écs is a village in Győr-Moson-Sopron county, Hungary.

Écs was first mentioned in 1172 as Esu or Echu. In the Middle Ages it was the property of minor noble families, and later of the Pannonhalma Abbey. During the Ottoman invasion, the Cseszneky, Oross and Siey families were the most important landlords in Écs.
