= Pápoc =

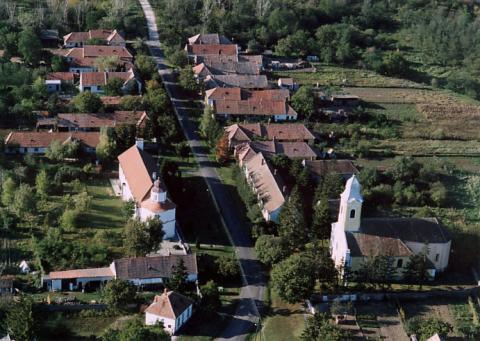

- Coat of arms

- Location of Pápoc in Hungary
- Coordinates: 47.41328°N 17.12826°E
- Country: Hungary
- Region: Western Transdanubia
- County: Vas
- Subregion: Celldömölki
- Rank: Village

Area
  - Total: 31.32 km^{2} (12.09 sq mi)

Population (1 January 2008)
  - Total: 340
  - Density: 11/km^{2} (28/sq mi)
- Time zone: UTC+1 (CET)
  - Summer (DST): UTC+2 (CEST)
- Postal code: 9515
- Area code: +36 95
- KSH code: 14067
- Website: http://papoc.hu/

Pápoc is a village in Vas county, Hungary.

== Sightseeing for visitors: the old rotunda of Árpád age ==
In the village there is an old architectural heritage from the romanesque art: the old rotunda. It was built in the 13th century. The inner space consists of four apses surrounding a central circular space. The rotunda has two floors: the stairs go up in a corridor inside the wall. The rotunda is built together with a monastery of St. Agustino Order. It has beautiful southern doorway.

== Outer references ==
- Gervers-Molnár, V. (1972): A középkori Magyarország rotundái. (Rotunda in the Medieval Hungary). Akadémiai, Budapest
- Gerevich Tibor: Magyarország románkori emlékei. (Die romanische Denkmäler Ungarns.) Egyetemi nyomda. Budapest, 1938.
- Henszlmann, I. (1876): Magyarország ó-keresztyén, román és átmeneti stylü mű-emlékeinek rövid ismertetése, (Old-Christian, Romanesque and Transitional Style Architecture in Hungary). Királyi Magyar Egyetemi Nyomda, Budapest
- Bedy Vince: A pápóci prépostság és perjelség története. [Geschichte der Probstei und des Priorates Pápocz.] (Gyõregyházmegye Múltjából, 6.) Gyõr, 1939.
- Csányi Károly: A pápóci négykarélyos, emeletes kápolna mûszaki leírása. [Die technische Beschreibung der vierpassförmigen Geschosskapelle zu Pápóc.] In: Bedy Vince: A pápóci prépostság és perjelség története. [Geschichte der Probstei und des Priorates Pápocz.] (Gyõregyházmegye Múltjából, 6.) Gyõr, 1939. 119–124. p.
