= Pázmándfalu =

- Flag Coat of arms

- Location of Győr-Moson-Sopron county in Hungary

- Location of Pázmándfalu
- Coordinates: 47.57054°N 17.78126°E
- Country: Hungary
- County: Győr-Moson-Sopron

Area
  - Total: 19.39 km^{2} (7.49 sq mi)

Population (2004)
  - Total: 965
  - Density: 49.76/km^{2} (128.9/sq mi)
- Time zone: UTC+1 (CET)
  - Summer (DST): UTC+2 (CEST)
- Postal code: 9085
- Area code: 96

Pázmándfalu is a village in Győr-Moson-Sopron county, Hungary.

In the 14th century it was property of the Cseszneky family.
