= Waldbach-Mönichwald =

- Municipality
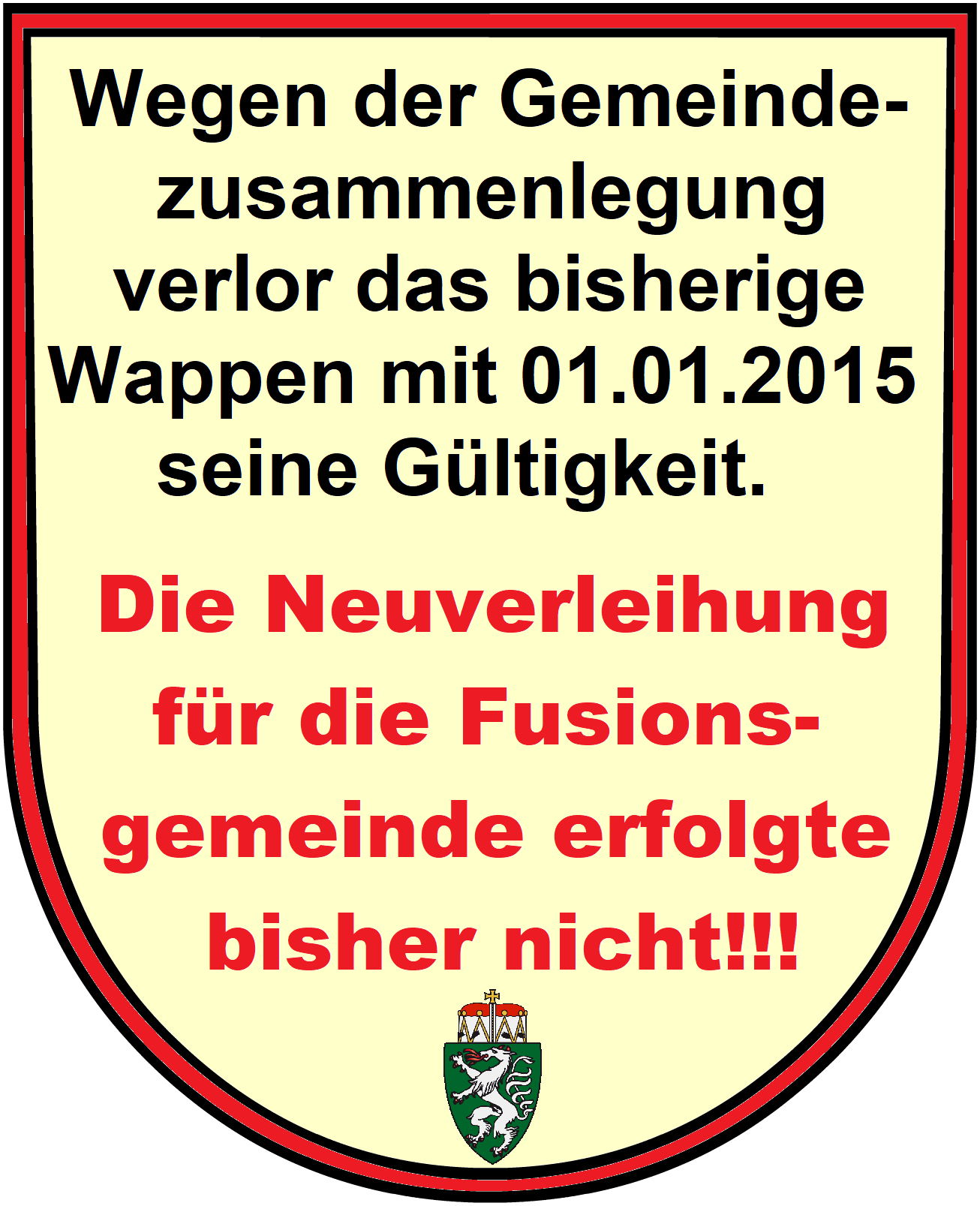
- Coat of arms

- Location within Austria
- Coordinates: 47°26′50″N 15°52′57″E
- Country: Austria
- State: Styria
- District: Hartberg-Fürstenfeld

Government
  - Mayor: Stefan Hold (ÖVP)

Area
  - Total: 53.78 km^{2} (20.76 sq mi)
- Elevation: 625 m (2,051 ft)

Population (2018-01-01)
  - Total: 1,523
  - Density: 28.32/km^{2} (73.35/sq mi)
- Time zone: UTC+1 (CET)
  - Summer (DST): UTC+2 (CEST)
- Postal code: 8251, 8252, 8253
- Website: waldbach.riskommunal.net

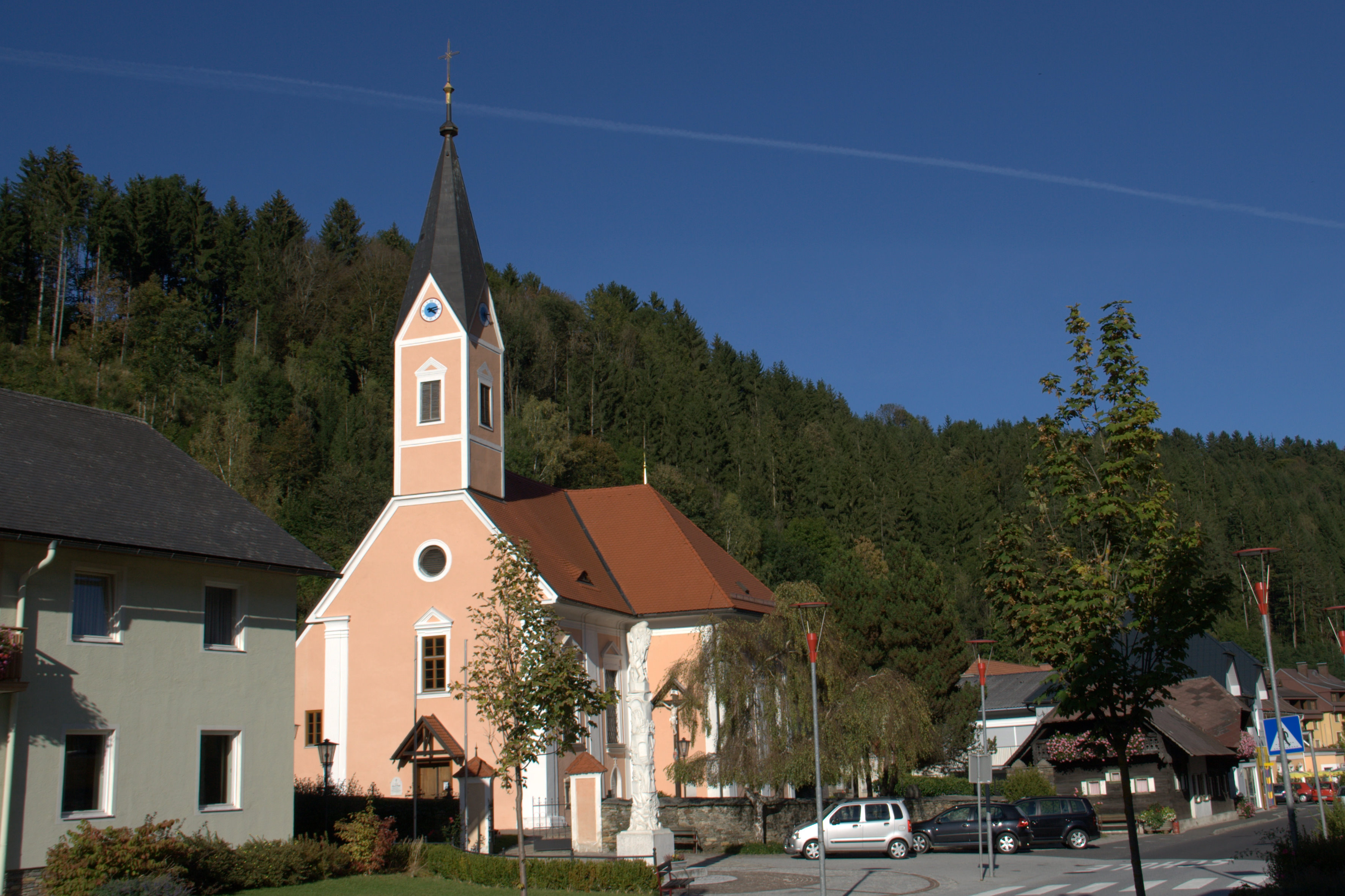
Parish church "Holy Georg" in Waldbach

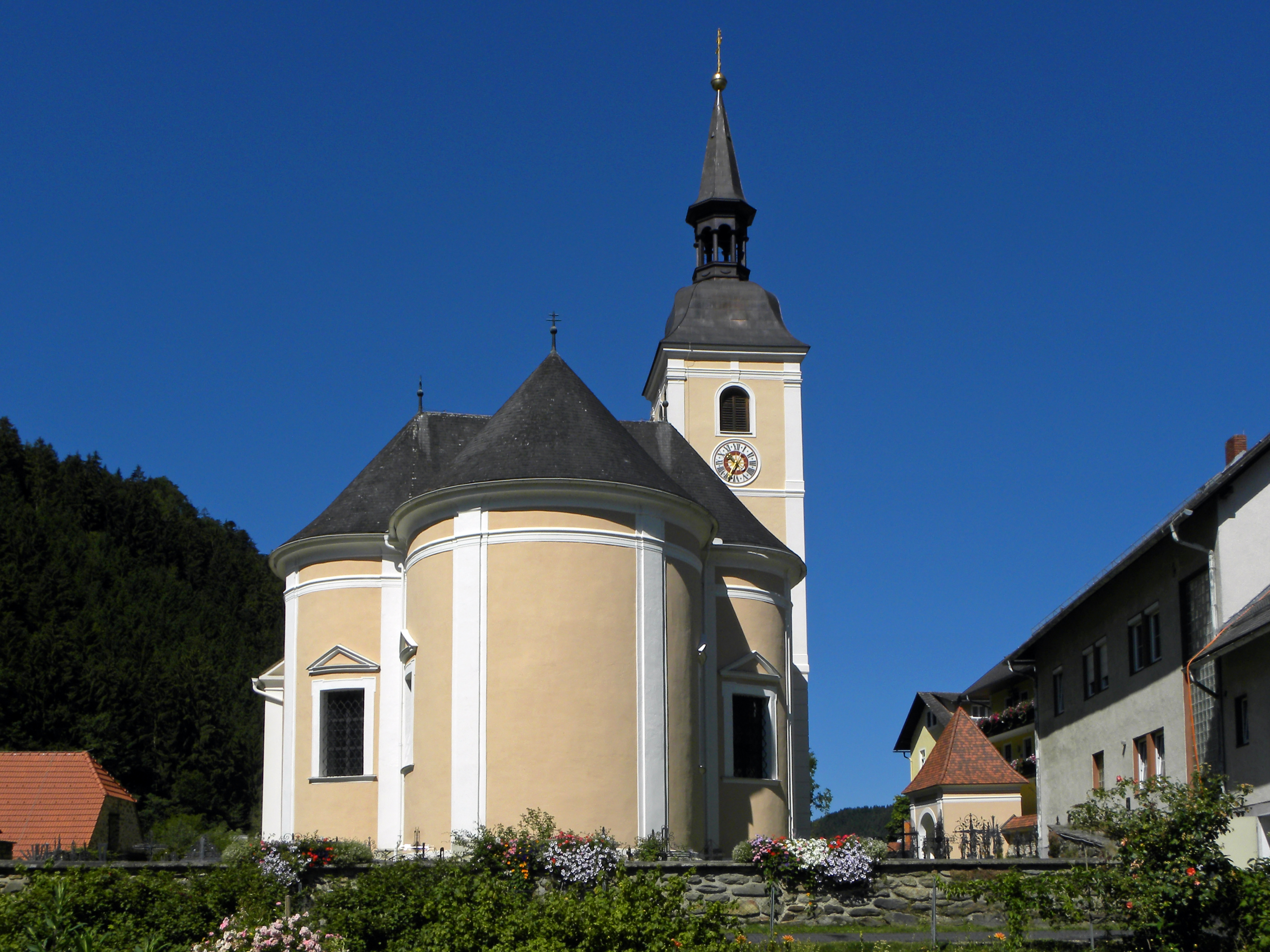
Parish church "Holy Peter and Paul" in Mönichwald

Waldbach-Mönichwald is a municipality since 2015 in the Hartberg-Fürstenfeld District of Styria, Austria.

The municipality was created as part of the Styria municipal structural reform, at the end of 2014, by merging the former towns Waldbach and Mönichwald.

A petition against the merger, raised by the town Waldbach at the constitutional court, was not successful.

== Geography ==
=== Municipality arrangement ===
The municipality territory includes the following six hamlets (populations as of January 2015):

- Arzberg (415)
- Breitenbrunn (81)
- Karnerviertel (567)
- Rieglerviertel (83)
- Schmiedviertel (303)
- Schrimpf (97)

The municipality consists of the five Katastralgemeinden: Arzberg, Karnerviertl, Rieglerviertl, Schmiedviertl and Schrimpf.

=== Tourism ===
The municipality formed, together with Fischbach, Miesenbach, Ratten, Rettenegg, Strallegg, St. Kathrein am Hauenstein, St. Jakob im Walde, Birkfeld, Wenigzell and Vorau, the tourism agency "Joglland-Waldheimat". The base is in the town St. Jakob im Walde.

== Politics ==
=== Mayor ===
In the election for the town council in April 2015, Stefan Hold (ÖVP) from Mönichwald was elected as the first mayor of the newly formed municipality.

The municipal court also included deputy mayor Arrigo Kurz (ÖVP) and the town treasurer Martin Übelher (SPÖ), both from Waldbach.

Until 31 December 2014, Andreas Riegler (ÖVP) in town Waldbach and Josef Freiberger (ÖVP), in the town Mönichwald, were the incumbent mayors. In the merger of the municipalities, there was at first no mayor. Thereby in protest against the merger, none of the former town politicians were to be mayor, and from the Landesregierung Steiermark with Franz Schröck, a Mitarbeiter of the Hartberg-Fürstenfeld, was installed as interim commissioner. This had led to the resulting duties until the election of the mayor during the inaugural meeting of the Municipal Council.

=== Municipal council ===
The municipal council consists of 15 members. After the results of the 2015 election, the council convened with the following members:

- 8 Mandate ÖVP,
- 4 Mandate SPÖ and
- 3 Mandate FPÖ.

At the session of the town council, the groups of both former municipalities were there, with eight members from Waldbach and seven from Mönichwald.

The prior elections brought the following results:

Party	2015			2010						2005						2000					
Party	merged municipality			Waldbach			Mönich- wald			Waldbach			Mönich- wald			Waldbach			Mönich- wald		
Party	Vote	%	Mand.	V.	%	M.	V.	%	M.	V.	%	M.	V.	%	M.	V.	%	M.	V.	%	M.
ÖVP	581	54	8	303	59	6	394	63	6	282	51	5	361	57	6	329	62	6	339	57	9
SPÖ	270	25	4	133	26	2	178	29	3	184	34	3	230	36	3	136	26	2	200	34	5
FPÖ	218	20	3	77	15	1	50	8	0	83	15	1	41	6	0	64	12	1	58	10	1
Counts	1,323			629			744			646			753			620			746		
Percentage	82%			83%			85%			85%			85%			87%			82%		

== Demographics ==
Year	Mönichwald	Waldbach	Total
1869	844	745	1589
1880	891	724	1615
1890	851	695	1546
1900	853	703	1556
1910	901	740	1641
1923	868	703	1571
1934	950	809	1759
1939	934	886	1820
1951	888	865	1753
1961	918	867	1785
1971	923	956	1879
1981	1034	920	1954
1991	1065	901	1966
2001	975	797	1772
2011	898	723	1621
2014	864	693	1557
