= Waldbach (Röhr) =

River in North Rhine-Westphalia, Germany

Location
- Country: Germany
- State: North Rhine-Westphalia

Physical characteristics
- Mouth
  - location: Röhr
  - coordinates: 51.3001°N 8.0433°E

Basin features
- Progression: Röhr→ Ruhr→ Rhine→ North Sea

Waldbach is a river of North Rhine-Westphalia, Germany. It is 8.1 km (5.0 mi) long and is a left tributary of the Röhr.

== See also ==
- List of rivers of North Rhine-Westphalia
