= Wechsel Pass =

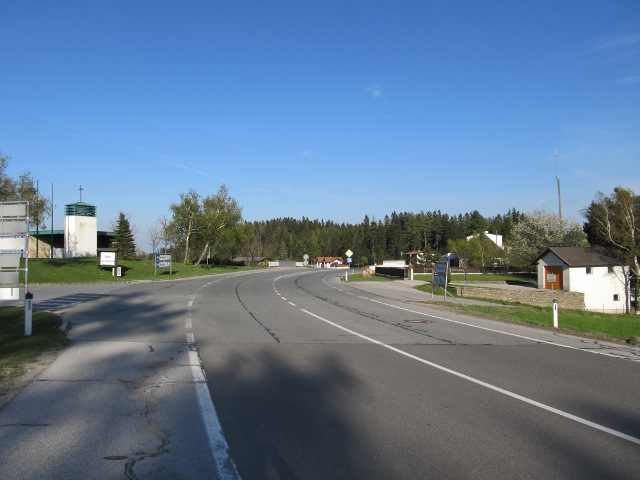
- Wechsel Pass

- Location within Austria
- Elevation: 943 m (3,094 ft)
- Traversed by: Federal Highway B 54

Location
- Location: Austria
- Range: Alps
- Coordinates: 47°31′58″N 15°54′46″E

The Wechsel Pass (elevation 943 m, 3,094 ft) is a mountain pass in the Austrian Alps, located between the Bundesländer of Lower Austria and Styria.

Along with the Semmering Pass, the Wechsel Pass is one of the most important connections between Lower Austria and Styria. Until the A2 Autobahn was built in the 1980s, it was the major highway between Vienna and Graz.

== See also ==
- List of highest paved roads in Europe
- List of mountain passes
