= Kissomlyó =

- Coat of arms

- Location of Kissomlyó in Hungary
- Coordinates: 47.14420°N 17.10200°E
- Country: Hungary
- Region: Western Transdanubia
- County: Vas
- Subregion: Celldömölki
- Rank: Village

Area
  - Total: 8.58 km^{2} (3.31 sq mi)

Population (1 January 2008)
  - Total: 246
  - Density: 28.7/km^{2} (74.3/sq mi)
- Time zone: UTC+1 (CET)
  - Summer (DST): UTC+2 (CEST)
- Postal code: 9555
- Area code: +36 95
- KSH code: 05953
- Website: https://kissomlyo.hu/

Kissomlyó is a village in Vas county, Hungary.
