= Aspangberg-St. Peter =

Aspangberg-Sankt Peter
- Municipality
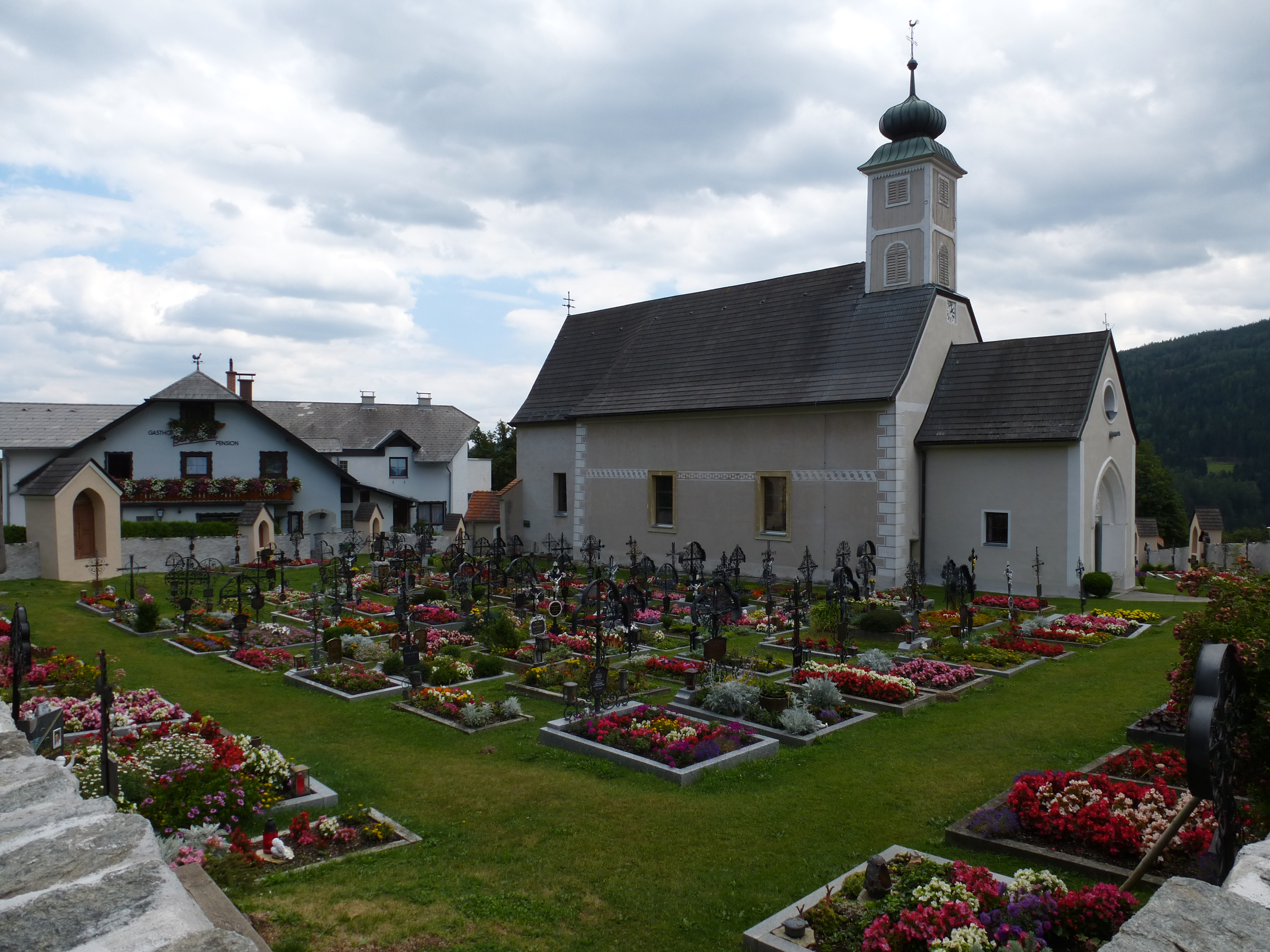
- Sankt Peter am Neuwald parish church

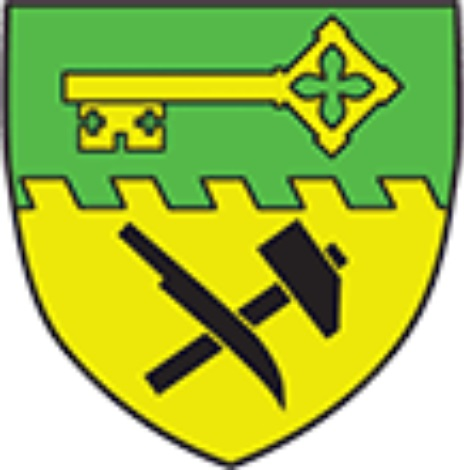
- Coat of arms

- Location within Austria
- Coordinates: 47°33′N 16°2′E
- Country: Austria
- State: Lower Austria
- District: Neunkirchen

Government
  - Mayor: Bernhard Brunner (ÖVP)

Area
  - Total: 81.49 km^{2} (31.46 sq mi)
- Elevation: 490 m (1,610 ft)

Population (2018-01-01)
  - Total: 1,888
  - Density: 23.17/km^{2} (60.01/sq mi)
- Time zone: UTC+1 (CET)
  - Summer (DST): UTC+2 (CEST)
- Postal code: 2870
- Area code: 02642
- Website: https://www.aspangberg-st-peter.gv.at/

Aspangberg-Sankt Peter is a town in the district of Neunkirchen in the Austrian state of Lower Austria.

== Population ==
Historical population
Year	Pop.	±%
1869	2,262	—
1880	2,309	+2.1%
1890	2,158	−6.5%
1900	2,121	−1.7%
1910	2,478	+16.8%
1923	2,358	−4.8%
1934	2,442	+3.6%
1939	2,271	−7.0%
1951	2,089	−8.0%
1961	1,969	−5.7%
1971	1,955	−0.7%
1981	2,013	+3.0%
1991	2,148	+6.7%
2001	2,015	−6.2%
2011	1,886	−6.4%
