= Bernstein Castle =

Castle in Austria

- Burgenland, Austria
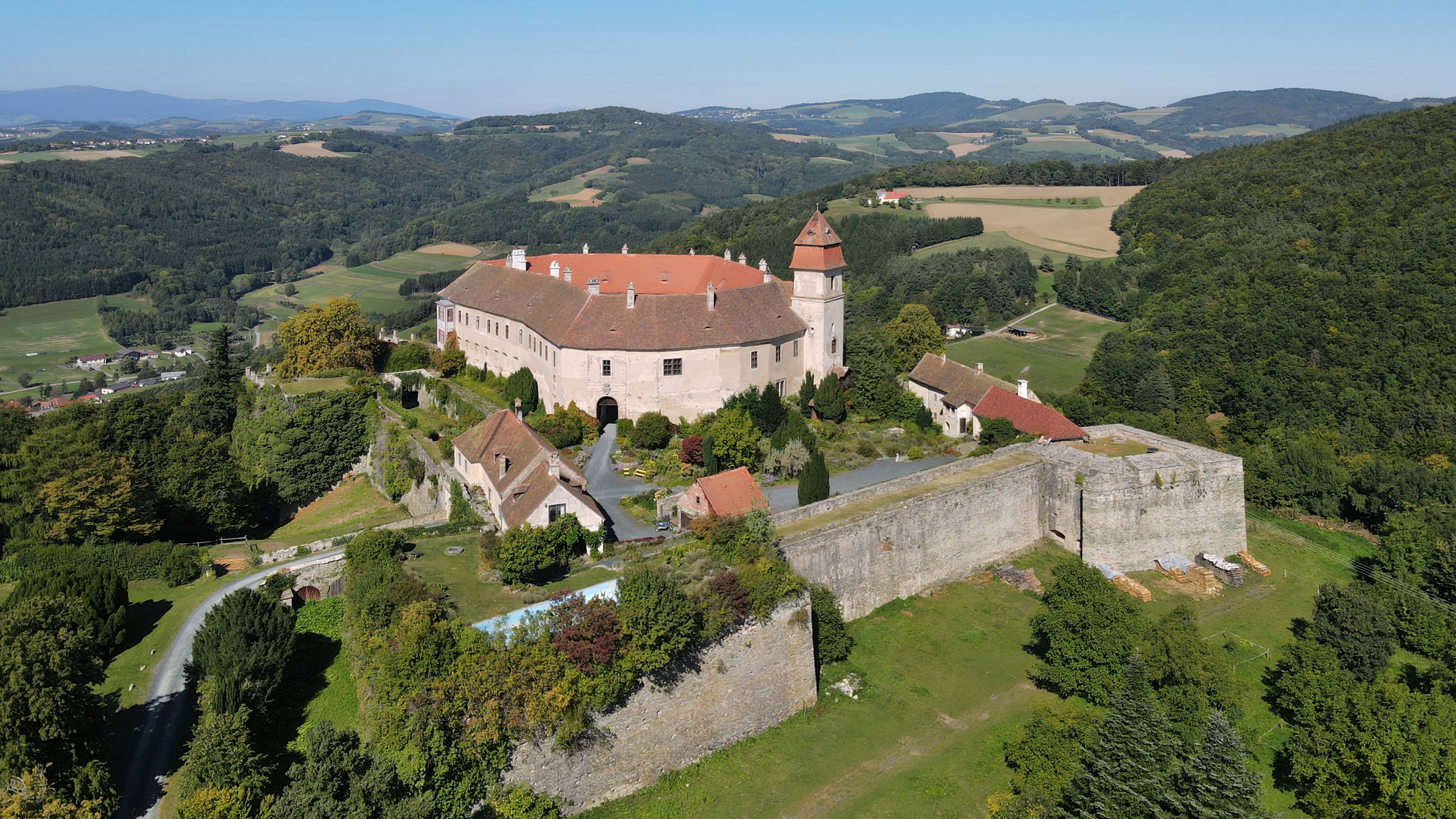

Site information
- Type: Castle
- Owner: Almásy dynasty
- Open to the public: yes
- Condition: major parts conserved

Location
- Coordinates: 47°24′23.5″N 16°15′07.1″E

Site history
- Built: around 860/ around 1199
- Battles/wars: From 1529 to 1532 besieged by the Turks, in 1604 besieged by the army of Stephen Bocskay.

Bernstein Castle (Hungarian: Borostyánkő vára) is a historical building in Bernstein im Burgenland, Austria, first mentioned in the 13th century.

== History ==
In 860 the whole region was part of the archbishopric of Salzburg. Erimbert, a liegeman of the archbishopric, handed over the Pinka to one Jacobus. The village name Rettenbach was not mentioned yet, but the old Slavic name of the nearby hamlet Grodnau (meaning "the village belonging to the castle") is a sign of the existence of a nearby castle, identifiable with castle Bernstein. Bernstein Castle is 615 metres (2,018 ft) above sea level.

From 1199 the castle was part of Hungary. It is not exactly known when the castle was handed over to Frederick II, Duke of Austria, and how long it was his property; but in 1236 Béla IV of Hungary conquered the castle. Some years later (in 1260) he gave it to count Henry I Kőszegi.

In 1336 the counts of Güssing and Bernstein were defeated by the Hungarian King Charles Robert of Anjou, and the castle of Bernstein became part of the Hungarian Kingdom. In 1388 the castle was given to the Kanizsai family. In 1482 it became property of Matthias Corvinus of Hungary for a short time; in 1487 Hans von Königsberg received the castle from Emperor Frederick III.

In 1529 the Turks besieged the castle, but they were not able to capture it. Another unsuccessful siege by the Turks followed in 1532. On that occasion the ring of bastions was erected in order to change the castle into a refuge.

In 1604 castle Bernstein was unsuccessfully besieged for weeks by a combined army consisting of Hungarians, Turks, and Tatars under the leadership of Stephen Bocskay. Due to an explosion of the gunpowder storeroom, in 1617 Ludwig Königsberg ordered the rebuilding of the Gothic inner part of the castle in Baroque style. The keep and towers were eliminated. A short time later (1644) Ehrenreich Christoph Königsberg sold the sovereignty and the castle to Count Ádám Batthyány. In 1864 Gustav Batthyány sold the castle to his manciple Edward O'Egan, whose heirs finally sold the castle to Eduard von Almásy. His family currently owns the castle. In 1953 a part of the castle was turned into a hotel and restaurant.

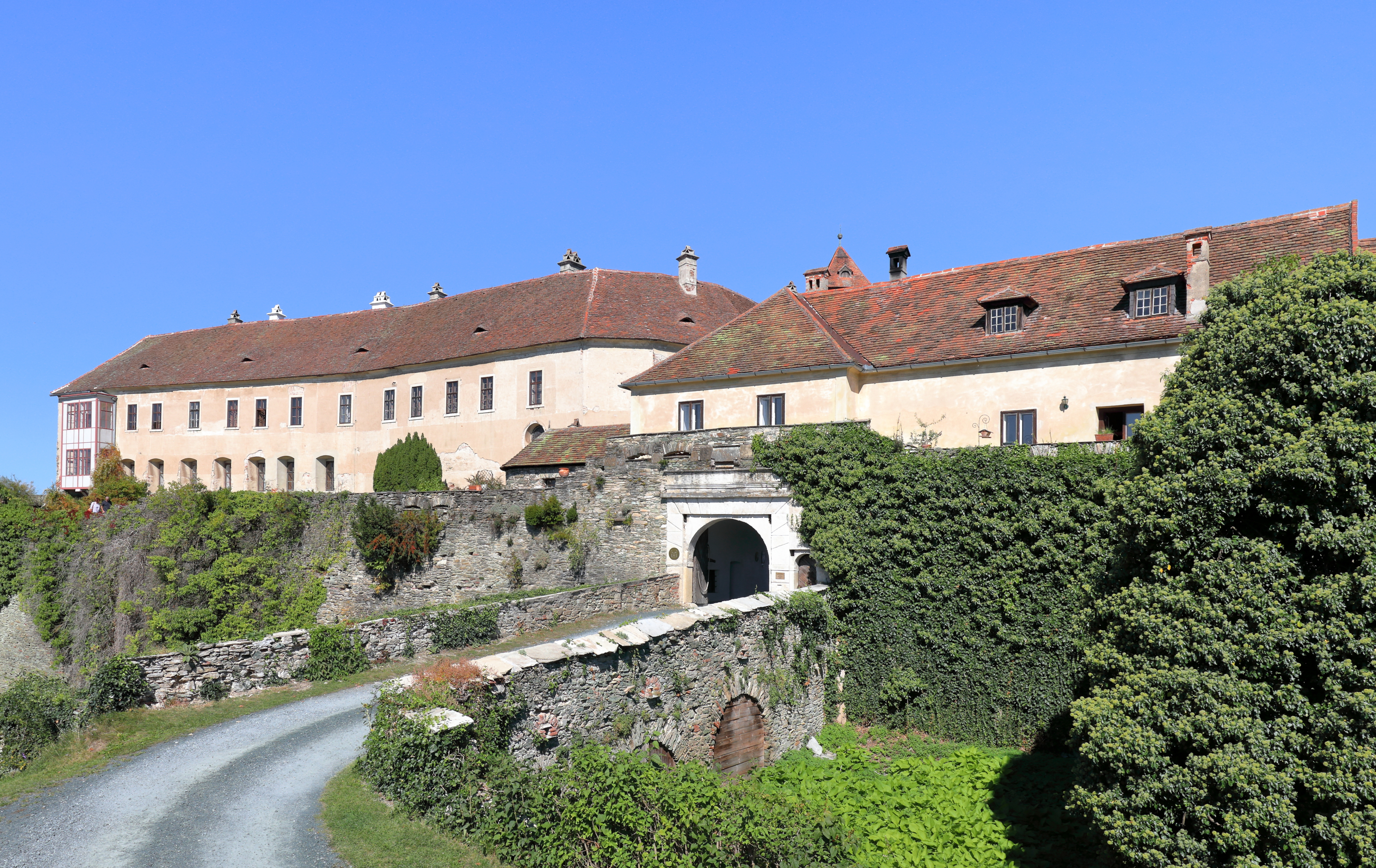
South view of the Bernstein Castle

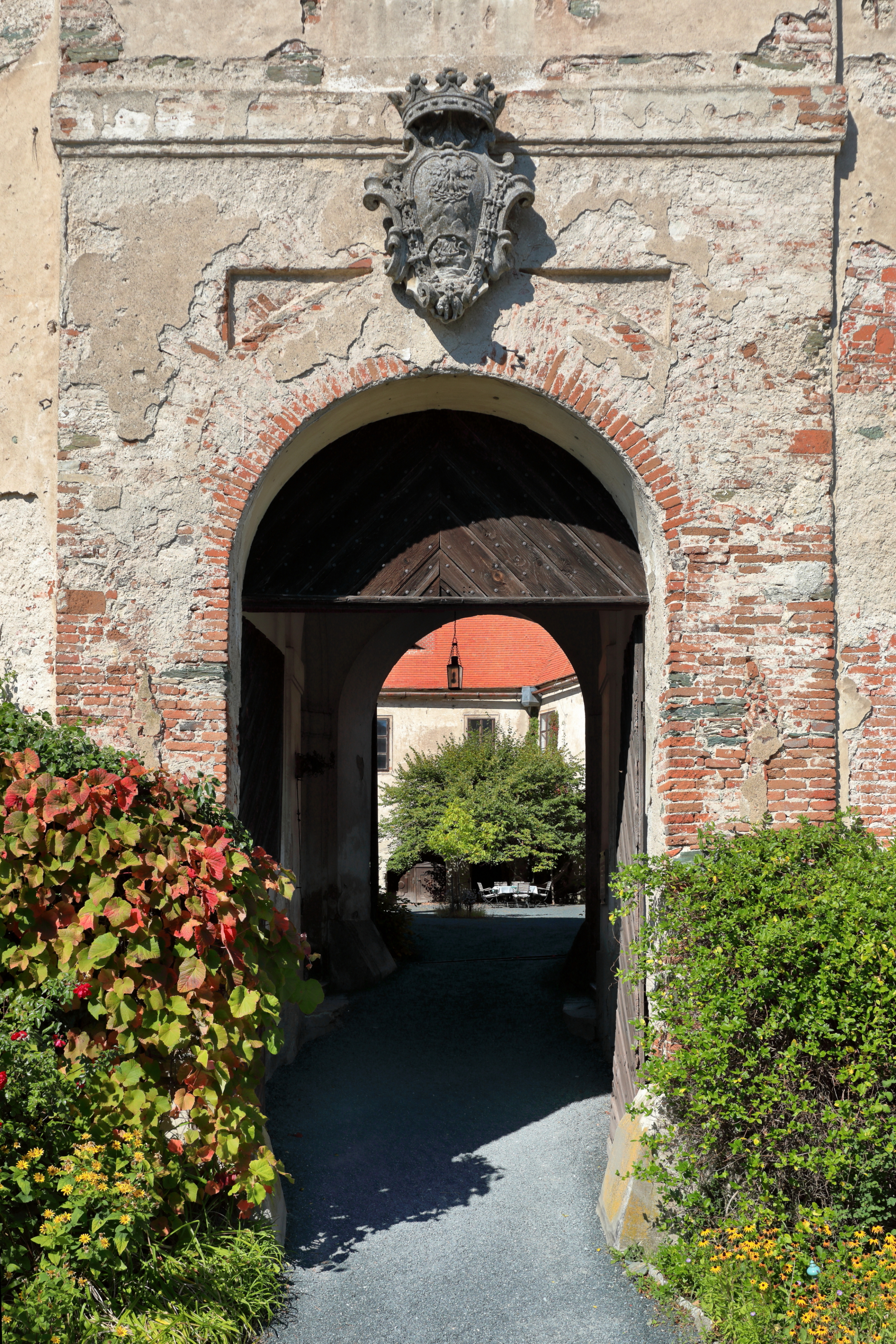
Inner gate of Bernstein Castle

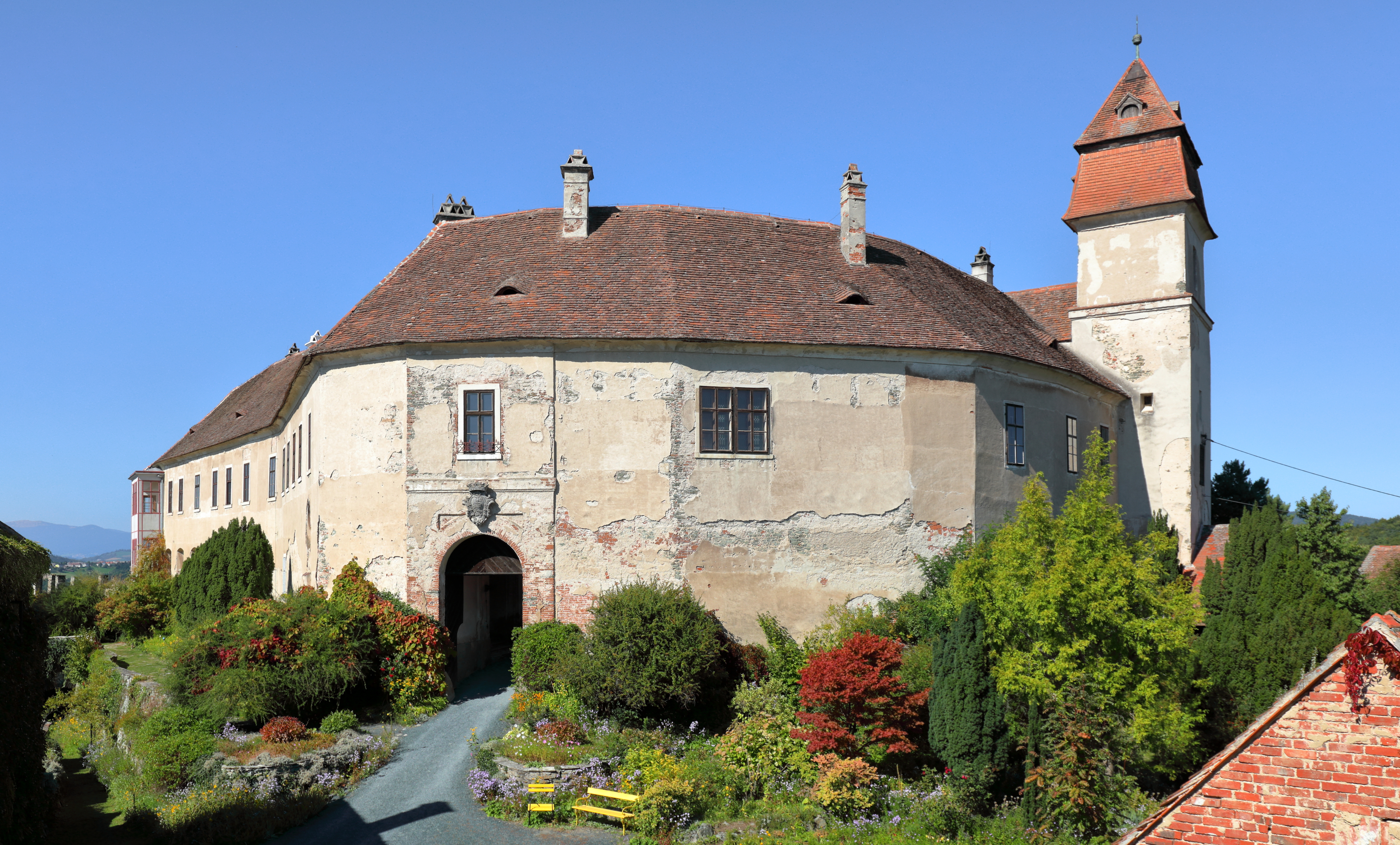
Outer courtyard of Bernstein Castle
