= Waldbach, Styria =

Waldbach
- Former municipality
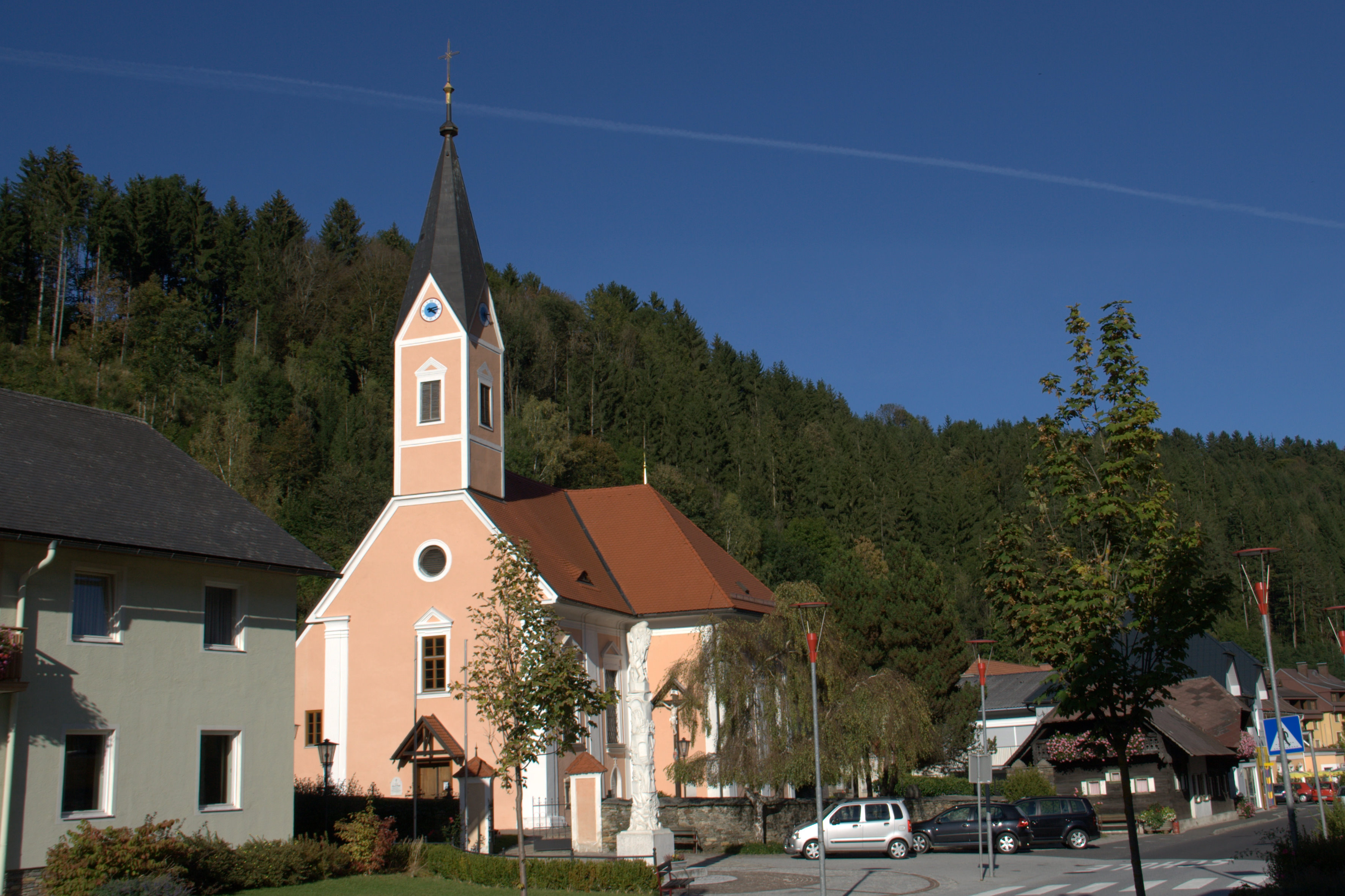
- Church in Waldbach

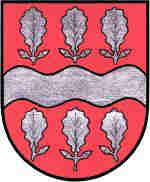
- Coat of arms

- Location within Austria
- Coordinates: 47°27′0″N 15°50′0″E
- Country: Austria
- State: Styria
- District: Hartberg-Fürstenfeld

Area
  - Total: 18.67 km^{2} (7.21 sq mi)
- Elevation: 625 m (2,051 ft)

Population (1 January 2016)
  - Total: 693
  - Density: 37.1/km^{2} (96.1/sq mi)
- Time zone: UTC+1 (CET)
  - Summer (DST): UTC+2 (CEST)
- Postal code: 8253
- Area code: 03336
- Vehicle registration: HB
- Website: www.waldbach. steiermark.at

Waldbach is a former municipality in the district of Hartberg-Fürstenfeld in Styria, Austria. Since the 2015 Styria municipal structural reform, it is part of the municipality Waldbach-Mönichwald.
