= Königsdorf, Austria =

Village in Burgenland, Austria

Königsdorf
- Municipality
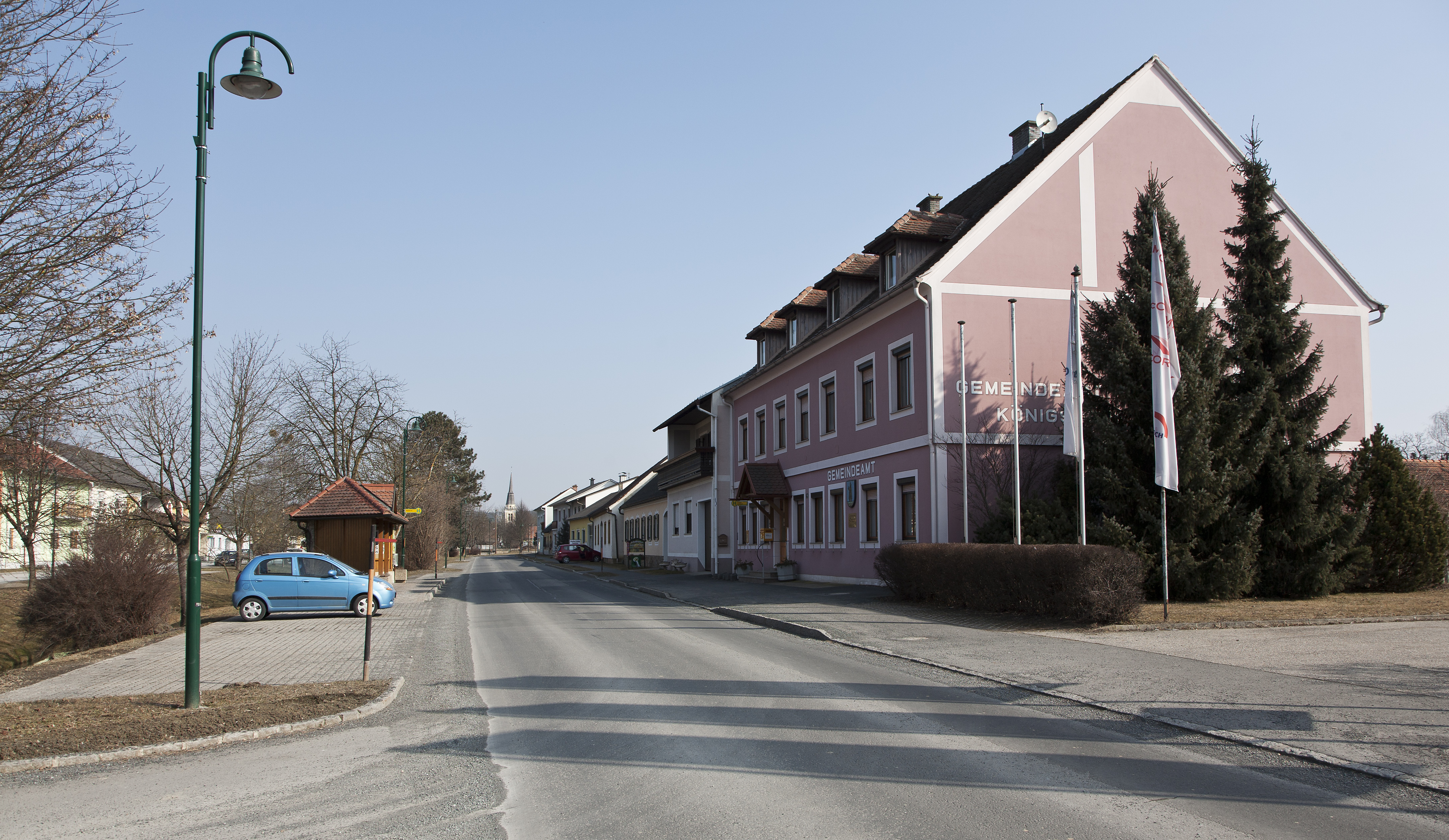
- Municipal office

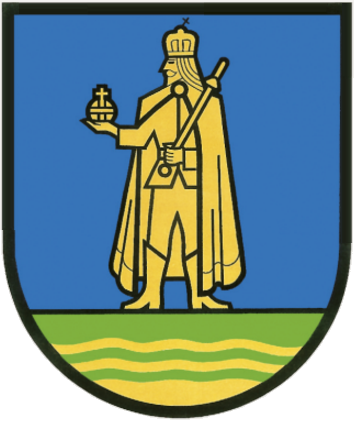
- Coat of arms

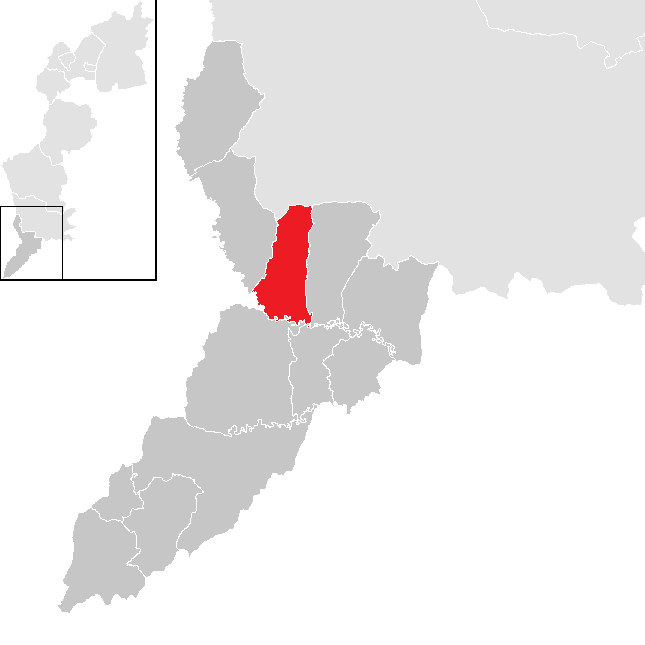
- Location within Jennersdorf district

- Location within Austria
- Coordinates: 47°0′N 16°10′E
- Country: Austria
- State: Burgenland
- District: Jennersdorf

Government
  - Mayor: Mario Trinkl (SPÖ)

Area
  - Total: 15.67 km^{2} (6.05 sq mi)
- Elevation: 236 m (774 ft)

Population (2022)
  - Total: 768
  - Density: 49.0/km^{2} (127/sq mi)
- Time zone: UTC+1 (CET)
  - Summer (DST): UTC+2 (CEST)
- Postal code: 7563
- Website: https://www.koenigsdorf.at/

Königsdorf (Hungarian: Királyfalva, Slovene: Kraljevci) is a village in the district of Jennersdorf in the Austrian state of Burgenland. In 2022 the population of the village was 768.

== Geography ==
Königsdorf is located at an altitude of 239m, and is in the valley of the river Lafnitz. The village is 10km to the south-east of Fürstenfeld. Neighbouring settlements include Kukmirn to the north, Eltendorf and Weichselbaum to the east, Jennersdorf to the south and Bad Loipersdorf and Rudersdorf to the west.

== History ==
Burial graves in the Kögelwald and objects were discovered during excavations in 1922 and 1925 (urns, pots, finger rings and a 12 cm tall statuette of Jupiter) indicating an early settlement in this area.

The letter of foundation for the Güssing Benedictines from 1157 describes the residents of the Lafnitz Valley as “Theotonici” (Germans), and a document from King Andreas III. from the year 1291 calls the border area near Styria “terra hospitum”, which means “the land of guests”. These “guests” were German. Königsdorf was under the power of the Güssing counts and was a royal estate in 1327. The place name Königsdorf (Kyralfalwa) was also mentioned for the first time in 1428 in King Sigismund 's award certificate to Peter Cheh de Leva, with which the Güssing province was handed over to him in 1428. The Catholic parish register records that the name comes from a chapel that was built in honor of King Stephen.

Baron Franz von Batthyány (1590–1625) was on the side of the Austrians in the Boczkay War. Therefore, in 1605, Boczkay's troops devastated his domains, including Königsdorf.

At the time of the Kuruc Wars, Königsdorf, like many other towns in the Batthyány, was destroyed in August 1704 by the Styrians, who were embittered by the Hungarian invasions .

Königsdorf belonged to Hungary (German West Hungary) until 1920/21. Since 1898, the Hungarian place-name Királyfalva had to be used due to the government's Magyarization policy in Budapest.

After the end of the First World War, after tough negotiations, German West Hungary was awarded to Austria in the Treaties of St. Germain and Trianon in 1919. From August 31 to November 1, 1921, as part of the seizure of Burgenland, Königsdorf was occupied by Hungarian irregulars who were involved in disputes with the Austrian gendarmes quartered in Gillersdorf. From November 13th to 30th, 1921, the military finally took the Königsdorf area into Austria.

The place has belonged to the newly founded federal state of Burgenland since 1921 (see also History of Burgenland).

== Population ==
Historical population
Year	Pop.	±%
1869	1,373	—
1880	1,374	+0.1%
1890	1,373	−0.1%
1900	1,226	−10.7%
1910	1,183	−3.5%
1923	1,093	−7.6%
1934	1,100	+0.6%
1939	1,081	−1.7%
1951	882	−18.4%
1961	850	−3.6%
1971	805	−5.3%
1981	895	+11.2%
1991	781	−12.7%
2001	757	−3.1%
2011	711	−6.1%
