= Christiane Brunner (Austrian politician) =

Austrian politician

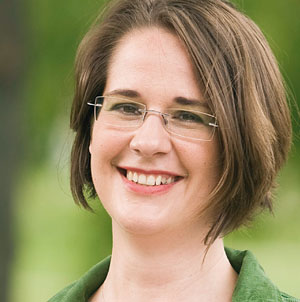
Christiane Brunner

Christiane Brunner (September 23, 1976 in Güssing) is an Austrian politician of the Green Party, and a project coordinator in the field of renewable energy. Brunner was a member of the Austrian National Council from 2008 to 2017.

== Education ==
Brunner attended elementary school in Mogersdorf between 1983 and 1987 and subsequently secondary school in Jennersdorf until 1991, where her mother was a teacher. In 1991, she transferred to the Bundesoberstufenrealgymnasium in Jennersdorf, where she passed the Matura in 1995 and of which her father was later principal.

She then studied law at the Karl Franzens University in Graz until 1996, but switched to a degree in environmental systems' science in 1996. She graduated in 2002 with the academic degree of Mag.rer.nat. Since 2007, Brunner has been studying law again, but this time at the Johannes Kepler University Linz.

Brunner has been working as a project coordinator in the field of renewable energy in Güssing since 2003.

== Political career ==
Brunner was a local councillor in Mogersdorf between 2002 and 2005, being elected to the local council as an independent member on the ÖVP list. She subsequently switched to the Green Party and has represented them in the municipal council since 2008. In addition, Brunner has been the district party spokeswoman for the Greens in Jennersdorf District since 2005. She is also a federal congress delegate for Burgenland and ran for the third place on the list in the 2005 provincial election in Burgenland. Brunner prevailed over the previous member of the National Council, Michaela Sburny, in drawing up the list for the 2008 National Council election and ran for the fifth place on the federal election proposal of the Greens. Brunner was sworn in as a member of the National Council on October 28, 2008, and as spokeswoman of the Green parliamentary club she took over the agendas of environmental, anti-nuclear and energy policy, as well as animal protection.

In the legislative period until 2013, she was a member of the following committees: Standing Subcommittee on European Union Affairs, Subcommittee of the Committee on Agriculture and Forestry, Subcommittee of the Constitutional Committee, Committee on Agriculture and Forestry, Committee on Petitions and Citizens' Initiatives, Committee on Economy and Industry, Environment Committee, Transport Committee.

Brunner has been involved with the citizens' initiative against the Fürstenfelder Expressway (S7) since 2003, and with the citizens' initiative against the Heiligenkreuz waste incineration plant since 2006.

== Private life ==
Brunner grew up in Wallendorf and lives in Jennersdorf.

== Awards ==
2019: Grand Decoration of Honor in Gold for Services to the Republic of Austria
