= Lafnitz (river) =

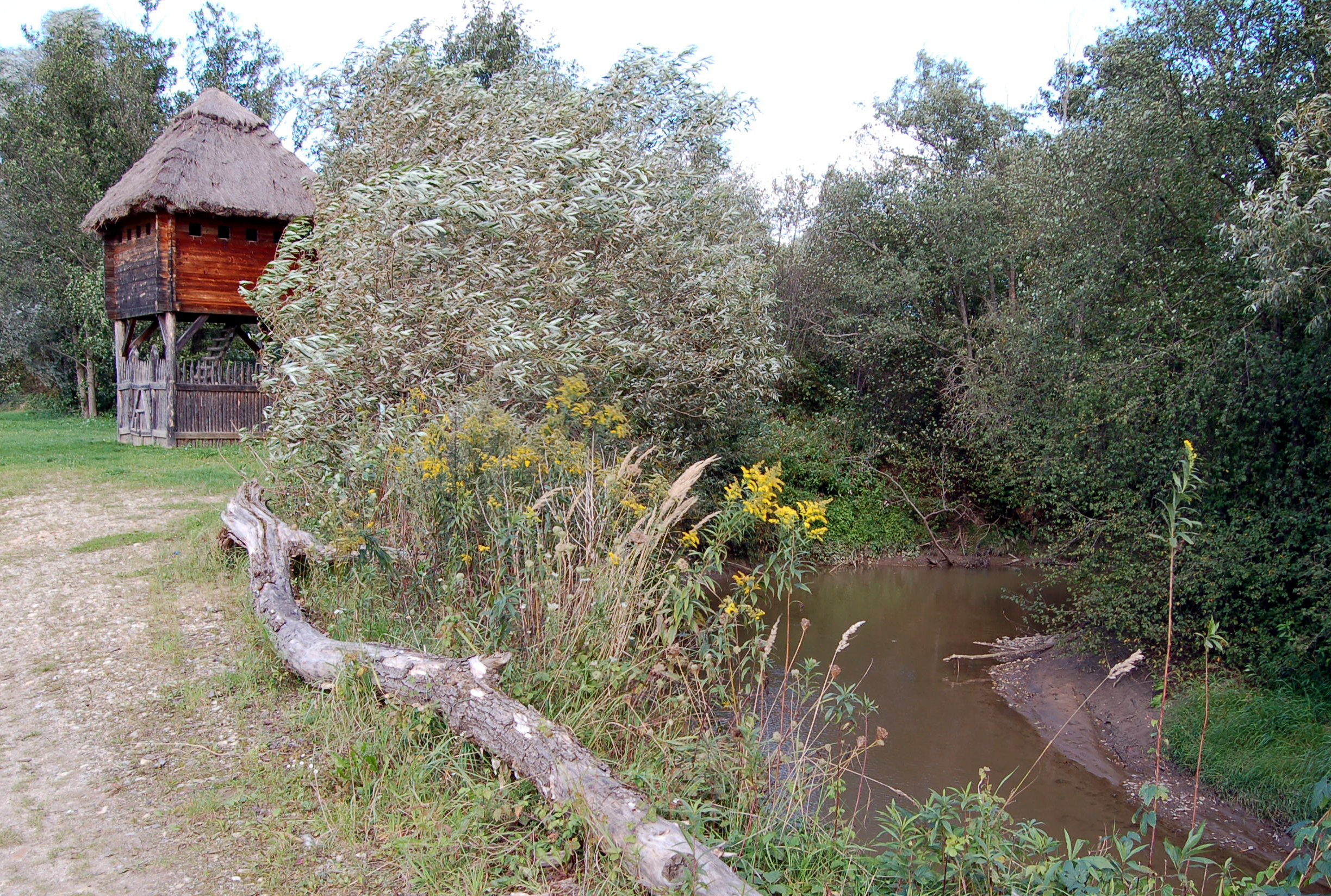
- A chartaque on the Lafnitz near Burgau.

Location
- Countries: Austria and Hungary

Physical characteristics
- Source
  - location: east of the Kreuzwirt, municipality of Wenigzell, Joglland
  - coordinates: 47°22′47″N 15°48′19″E
  - elevation: 930 m (AA)
- Mouth
  - location: near Szentgotthárd into the Raab
  - coordinates: 46°57′30″N 16°16′29″E
  - elevation: 224 m (735 ft)
- Length: 113.6 km (70.6 mi)
- Basin size: 1,992 km^{2} (769 sq mi)

Basin features
- Progression: Rába→ Danube→ Black Sea
- Landmarks: Small towns: Szentgotthárd; Villages: Rohrbach an der Lafnitz, Lafnitz, Neudau, Burgau, Deutsch Kaltenbrunn, Rudersdorf, Königsdorf, Hackerberg
- Tributaries
  - right: Voraubach, Safen, Feistritz, Rittschein

Ramsar Wetland
- Official name: Lafnitztal
- Designated: 1 March 2002
- Reference no.: 1169

The Lafnitz (Hungarian: Lapincs) is a river in southeastern Austria and (briefly) western Hungary.

The Lafnitz is 113.6 km (70.6 mi) long, and has a basin area of 1,992 km^{2} (769 sq mi). It rises near the border of Styria and Lower Austria, and flows in a generally southeastern direction through the towns of Rohrbach an der Lafnitz, Lafnitz, Markt Allhau, Wolfau, Wörth an der Lafnitz, Neudau, Deutsch Kaltenbrunn, Rudersdorf, Königsdorf, and Heiligenkreuz im Lafnitztal, and it empties into the Rába less than a kilometer inside Hungary, in the town of Szentgotthárd. For much of its length it forms the border between Styria and Burgenland. Its largest tributary is the Feistritz.
