= Battle of Saint Gotthard =

Battle of Saint Gotthard may refer to:

- Battle of Saint Gotthard (1664)
- Battle of Saint Gotthard (1705)
