= Rohrbrunn =

Coordinates: 47°07′N 16°06′E

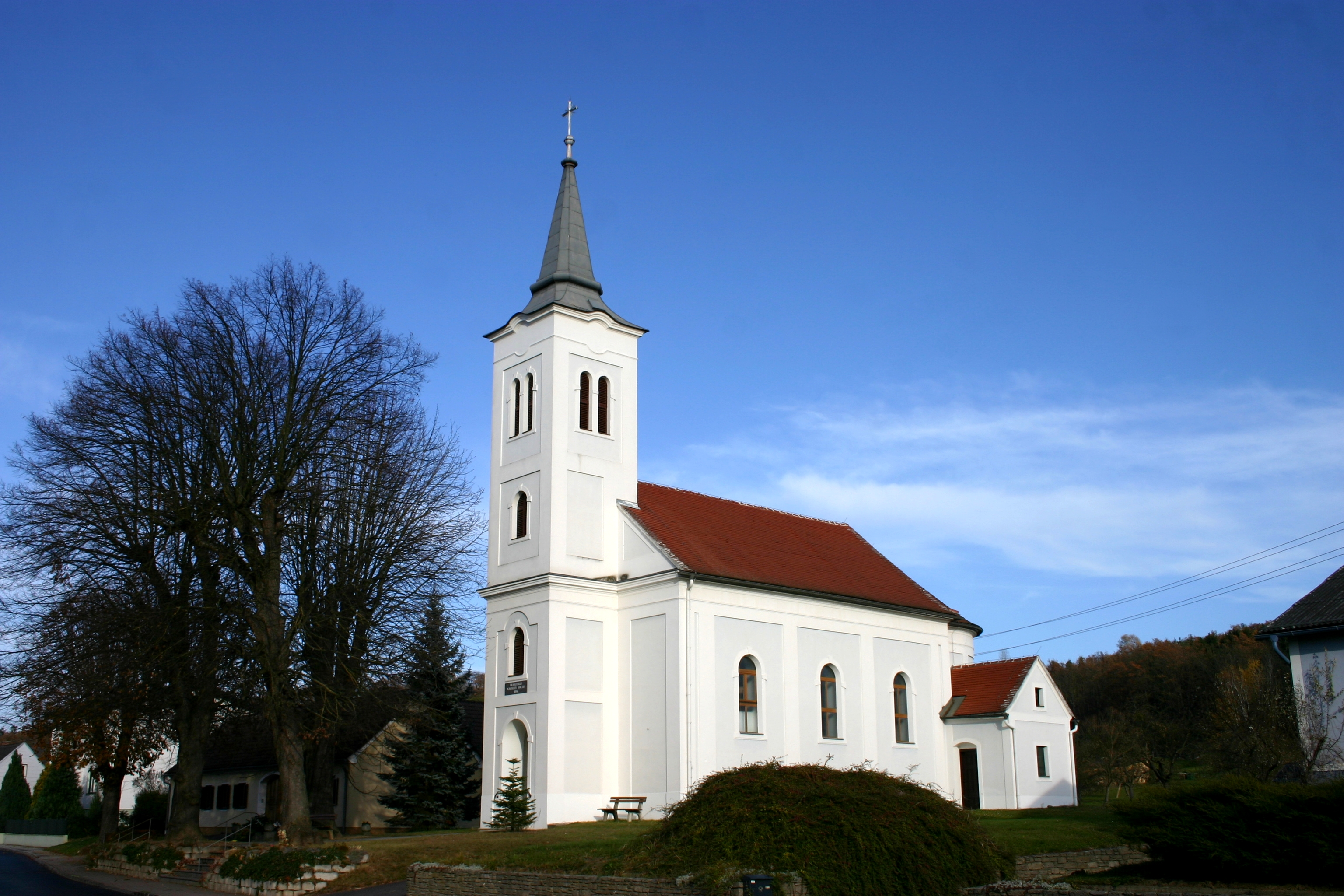
Catholic church in Rohrbrunn

Rohrbrunn (Hungarian: Nádkút) is a village in Burgenland, Austria. It is part of the municipality of Deutsch Kaltenbrunn in the district of Jennersdorf. Rohrbrunn is located near the border of Styria by the river Lafnitz.

== History ==
Rohrbrunn was part of the Kingdom of Hungary until the Treaty of Trianon in 1920. It belonged to Vas county. The small village has been inhabited by ethnic Germans since its establishment in the Middle Ages. According to the Roman Catholic ecclesiastic administration Rohrbrunn always belonged to the nearby parish of Deutsch Kaltenbrunn.

"Nádkuth" was given to Ferenc Batthyány in 1524. The ownership of the noble Batthyány family lasted about 350 years. In 1605 the army of Stephen Bocskay destroyed almost the whole village.

In 1851 Elek Fényes recorded that Rohrbrunn was populated by 428 people (almost exclusively Roman Catholic Germans). There was a toll-house in the village due to its proximity to the border of Styria. The Batthyánys remained the main landowners. The peasants earned their livelihood from growing wheat, tobacco, hemp and fruits or making a small amount of wine.

Alois Brunner, one of the most infamous Austrian Nazi war criminals, was born in Nádkút in 1912. In World War I a total of 31 men perished.

== Name ==
In 18th and 19th century sources both the traditional German and Hungarian names of the village are mentioned. Rohrbrunn and Nádkút have the same meaning: "reed-well" which refers to the marshes of the Lafnitz valley. The German name was recorded in 1427 as Rohrprunn. The Hungarian name was recorded as Nádkuth in 1524. The German version became the sole official name of the village after 1920.

== Population ==
Year	Population
1802	357
1812	371
1856	452
1910	685
1930	750
2001	581

== Notable people from Rohrbrunn ==
=== Born in Rohrbrunn ===
- Alois Brunner, Austrian Nazi war criminal (1912–2001 or 2010)
