= Rohrbach an der Lafnitz =

- Municipality
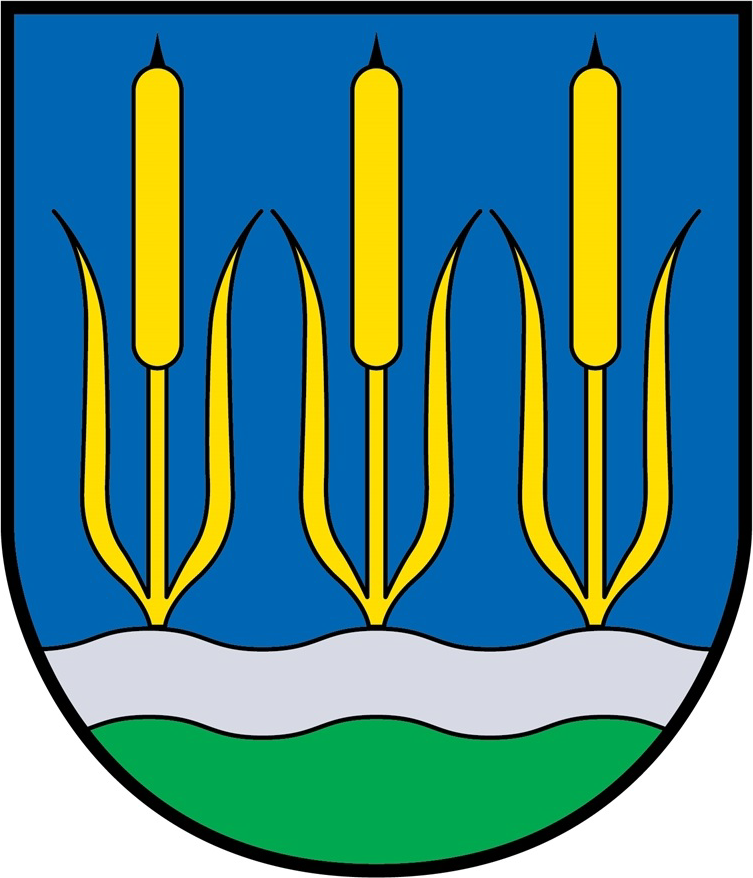
- Coat of arms

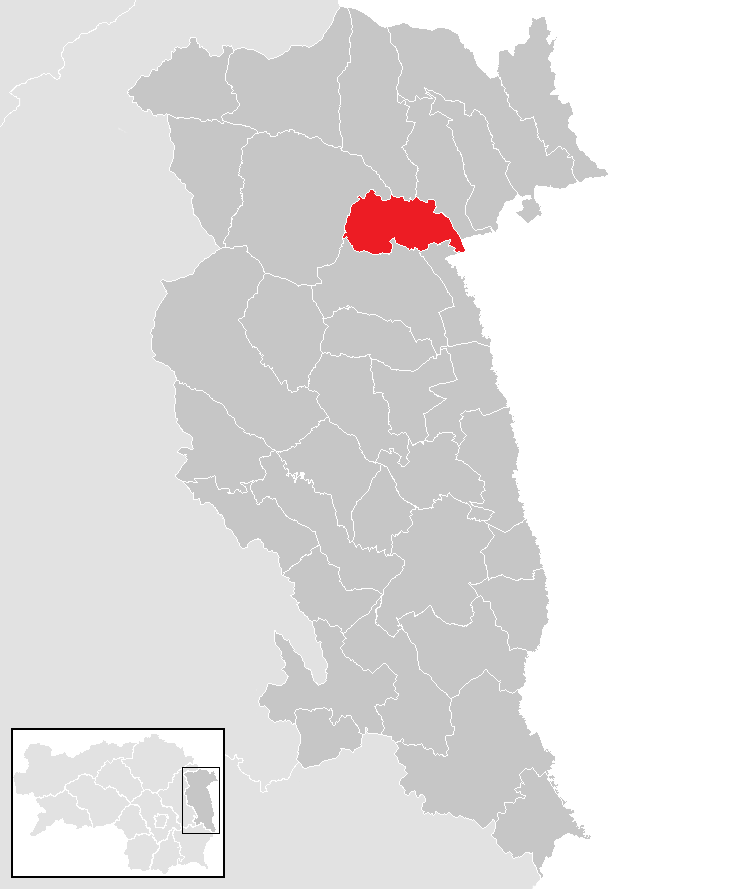
- Location within Hartberg-Fürstenfeld district

- Location within Austria
- Coordinates: 47°23′26″N 15°59′44″E
- Country: Austria
- State: Styria
- District: Hartberg-Fürstenfeld

Government
  - Mayor: Günter Putz (SPÖ)

Area
  - Total: 26.37 km^{2} (10.18 sq mi)
- Elevation: 455 m (1,493 ft)

Population (2018-01-01)
  - Total: 2,634
  - Density: 99.89/km^{2} (258.7/sq mi)
- Time zone: UTC+1 (CET)
  - Summer (DST): UTC+2 (CEST)
- Postal code: 8234, 8250
- Area code: +43 3338
- Vehicle registration: HF
- Website: www.rohrbach-lafnitz. steiermark.at

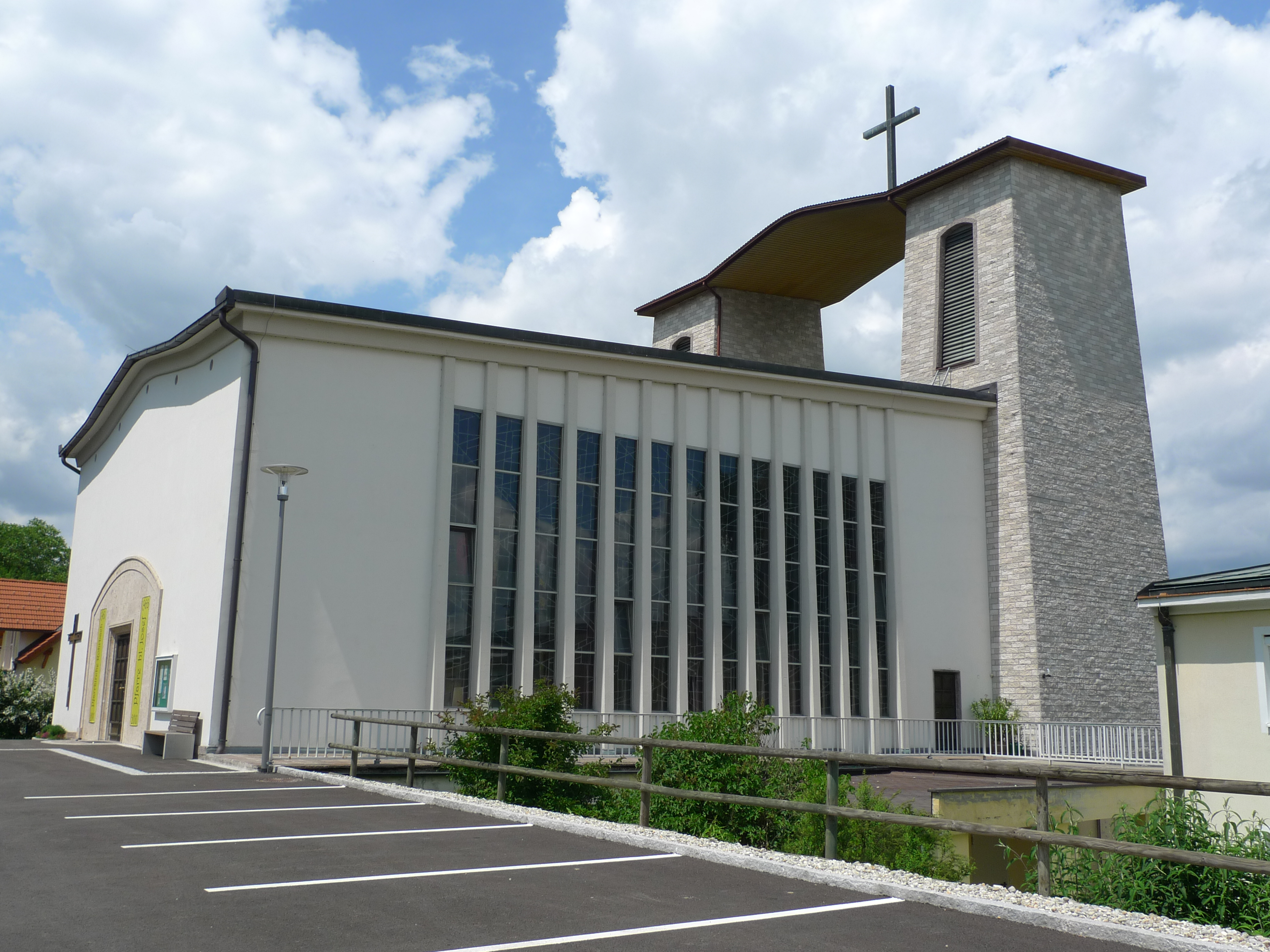
Parish church of St. Joseph the Worker

== Geography ==
Rohrbach an der Lafnitz is in the Joglland, approximately 13 kilometres (8.1 mi) north of Hartberg city. It is located where the River Limbach joins the Lafnitz. The municipality is too small to be subdivided.

== Transport ==
Rohrbach an der Lafnitz has good transportation connections. The Wechsel Straße (B 54) between Wiener Neustadt and Hartberg passes through it, and the Süd Autobahn between Vienna and Graz passes approximately 10 kilometres (6.2 mi) away.

The Rohrbach-Vorau station on the Thermenbahn provides a rail connection to Vienna and Hartberg.

The Graz and Vienna airports are both approximately 100 kilometres (62 mi) away.

== Education ==
The municipality has a kindergarten, a Volksschule and a Neue Mittelschule.

== Registered landmarks ==
- The Roman Catholic parish church of St. Joseph the Worker, built overlooking the town in 1959–1961, was designed by Eberhardt Jäger and contains a triptych stained glass window by Margret Bilger.
- The so-called Zeilbrücke is a lenticular truss bridge carrying the Thermenbahn across the Lafnitz valley. The bridge is shared between Eichberg, Rohrbach and Schlag bei Thalberg; the centre of the river constitutes the border between the latter two.

== Notable residents ==
- Hans Gross (1930–1992) was made an honorary citizen of Rohrbach an der Lafnitz in 1984.
