= Battle of Saint Gotthard (1664) =

Part of the Austro-Turkish War

Coordinates: 46°56′30″N 16°13′00″E

- Part of the Austro-Turkish War (1663–1664)
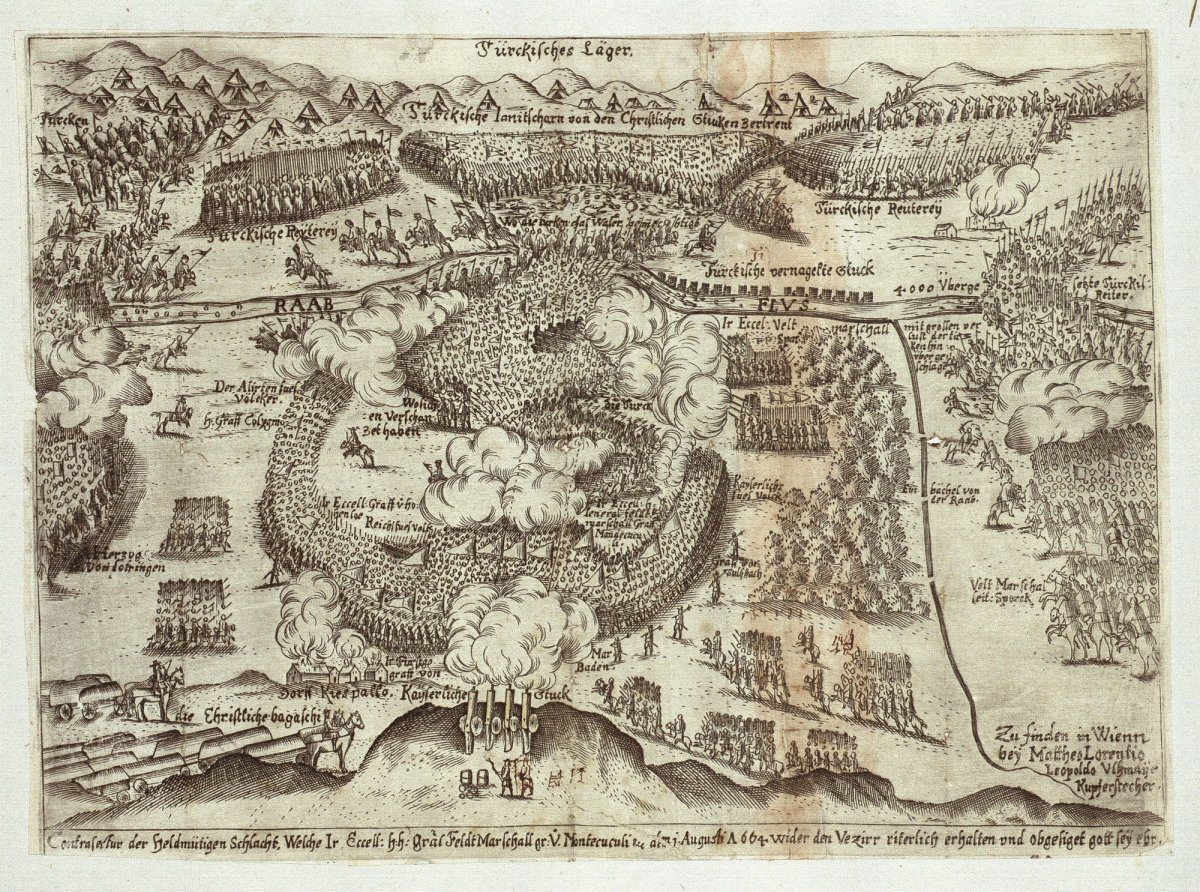
- Battle of Saint Gotthard
Date	1 August 1664
Location	Szentgotthárd, Vas County, Kingdom of Hungary (now in Hungary)
Result	Imperial–French victory

Belligerents
Holy Roman Empire: Habsburg monarchy; League of the Rhine; France	Ottoman Empire: Crimean Khanate

Commanders and leaders
(Holy Roman Empire) Raimondo Montecuccoli (Holy Roman Empire) Johann von Sporck (Holy Roman Empire) Margrave von Baden (Kingdom of France) Comte de Coligny (Holy Roman Empire) Prince Waldeck (Holy Roman Empire) Philip of Sulzbach	(Ottoman Empire) Köprülüzade Fazıl Ahmed Pasha

Strength
~26,000–28,000, 30,000 or 40,000	~50,000–60,000 (30,000 remained unengaged) Total: 150,000; ~60,000 janissaries, and sipahi 60,000–90,000 irregular

Casualties and losses
2,000	8,000–10,000 14,000–22,000

The Battle of Saint Gotthard (Turkish: Saint Gotthard Muharebesi; German: Schlacht bei St. Gotthard; Hungarian: Szentgotthárdi csata), of the Austro-Turkish War (1663–1664), took place on 1 August 1664 on the Raab between Mogersdorf and the Cistercian monastery St. Gotthard in West Hungary (today Hungary). It was fought between Imperial Army forces, including German, Swedish and French contingents, led by Imperial commander-in-chief Count Raimondo Montecuccoli and the army of the Ottoman Empire under the command of Köprülü Fazıl Ahmed Paşa.

As the Ottoman army tried to advance through Hungary towards Vienna, they were stopped on the side of the river Raab where they were charged and defeated by the Imperial forces. As a consequence, the Ottomans signed the Peace treaty of Vasvár a week later, on 10 August. Even though the Turks were militarily defeated, Emperor Leopold signed a disadvantageous treaty which shocked Europe as well as the Hungarian magnates, leading to the later Magnate conspiracy.

== Preparations ==
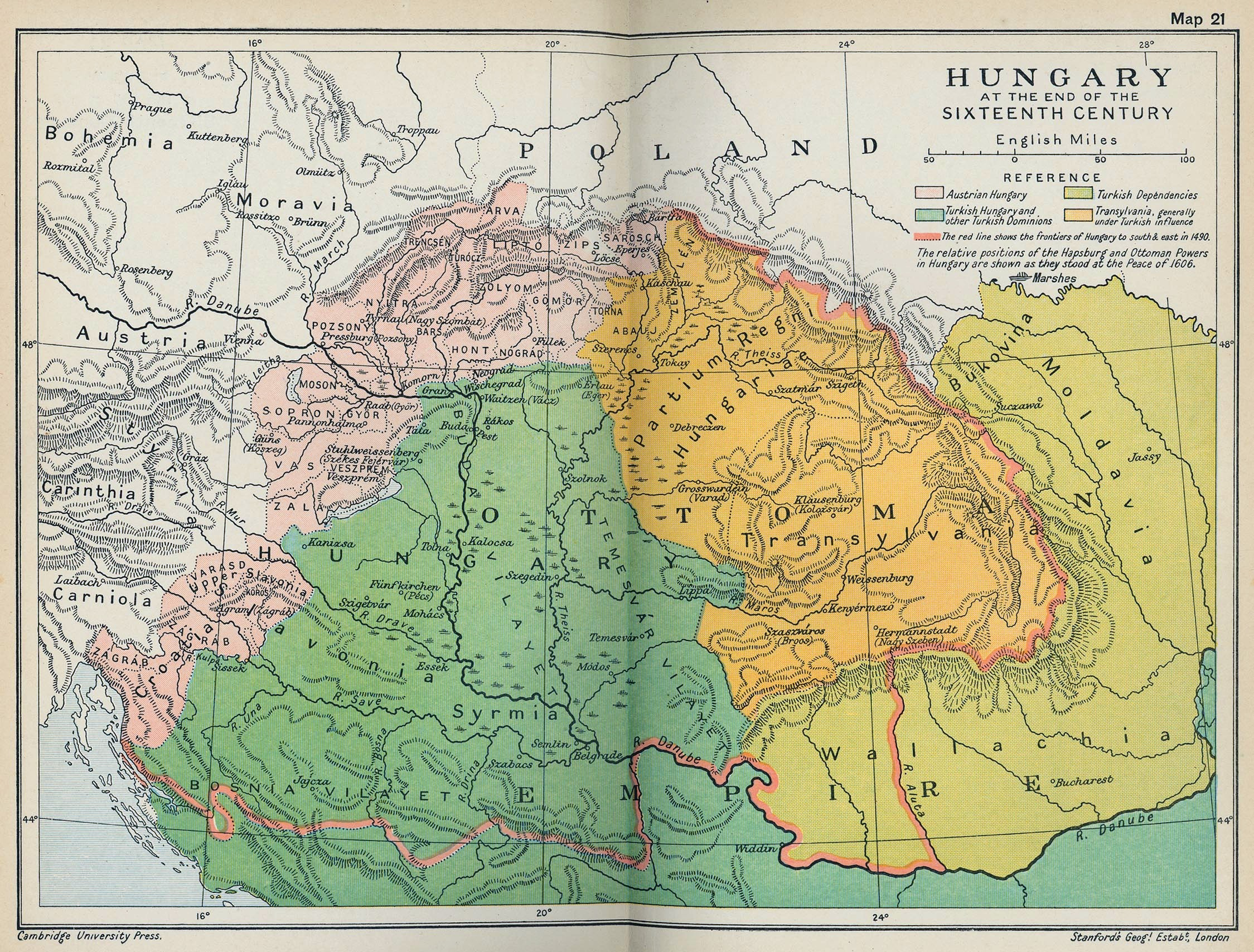
Hungary at the end of 16th century. The red line shows the southern and eastern frontiers of Hungary in 1490. By the occupation of Buda in 1541, Hungary was divided into three parts: pink: Royal Hungary, green: Ottoman Hungary, yellow: Principality of Transylvania

Ottoman dominance in Hungary began with the Battle of Mohács in 1526, which resulted in the conquest of center part of Hungary by Suleiman the Magnificent in 1541. Meanwhile, the western parts of Hungary that ruled by Austrian Habsburg king became known as Royal Hungary, the eastern part became the Principality of Transylvania. Although the Ottomans had been in relative decline since the death of Suleiman I, Ottoman power saw a resurgence under the extremely capable Köprülü family who sought to destroy the Austrian Habsburgs once and for all. They found their casus belli when the Habsburgs supported a Transylvanian rebellion against Ottoman rule.

Transylvania had escaped Ottoman conquest during the invasion of Hungary and retained its independence by playing off of their powerful neighbors: Poland, Austria and the Ottomans. They recognized Ottoman suzerainty and paid a tribute to the Porte but were given political and religious autonomy in return. In 1658, seeking new land for his principality, Prince George Rákóczy II invaded Poland with his Swedish allies in the Second Northern War. After initial success, he was defeated by the Poles and fled back to Transylvania. On hearing about Rákóczy's unauthorized war, the Ottomans declared war on their vassal. It was not long before Grand Vizier Köprülü Mehmed Pasha (Vizier 1656-1661) defeated Rákóczy and conquered Transylvania. The new Transylvanian prince, János Kemény, fled to Vienna, seeking Austrian support.

Emperor Leopold I, not wishing to see Transylvania fall under direct Ottoman control, sent Montecuccoli into Hungary with his small army. Montecuccoli gave no direct support as he was severely outnumbered by the Ottomans. The Ottomans, meanwhile, completed the conquest of Transylvania and built up their forces in Ottoman Hungary. Leopold I, not wishing to face the Turks alone, summoned the Imperial Diet in January 1663.

The Turks failed to conquer the fortress of Nové Zámky six times, but managed to do so in 1663. It was made the center of an Ottoman province, the Uyvar eyalet in present-day southern Slovakia. Turks and Tatars crossed the Danube in strength in 1663, ravaging Slovakia, Moravia, and Silesia. They took 12,000 slaves in Moravia. Several Turkish divisions reached as far as Olomouc.

== Diplomatic efforts ==
Although Leopold personally objected to Protestantism, he had to rely on his Protestant German princes to provide military aid. Even worse was the military aid from France, which was (and continued to be until the Diplomatic Revolution of 1756) Austria's nemesis. Despite numerous objections from some Protestant princes, help was not withheld. The League of the Rhine - a French dominated group of German princes - agreed to send a corps of 6,000 men independently commanded by Count Coligny of France and Prince Johann Philipp of Mainz. By September 1663, Brandenburg and Saxony had also agreed to contingents of their own. In January 1664, the Imperial Diet agreed to raise 21,000 men, although this army did not yet exist other than on paper. The Turks had declared war in April 1663, but were slow in executing their invasion plans.

== Battle ==
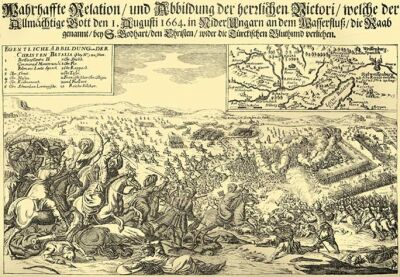
The Battle in an engraving of the era.

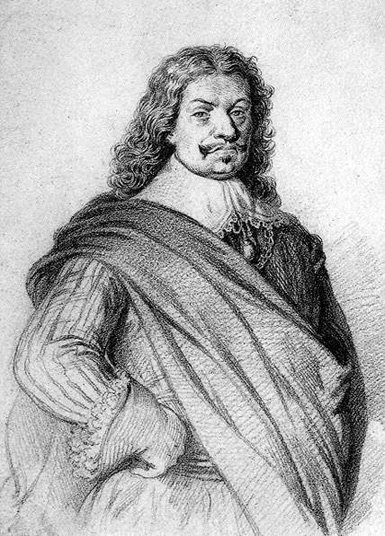
Raimondo Montecuccoli

Köprülü's army, which might have numbered 120-150,000, probably included some 60,000 Janissaries and Sipahis, 60-90,000 Azaps, Akıncıs, Tatars and vassals and allegedly 360 guns.

Montecuccoli's army consisted of Habsburg forces (including Czech infantry and a few hundred Hungarians, approx. 2,000 Croatians) and forces from the German principalities, French brigades, a Piedmontese regiment .

The Habsburg forces: 5,000 infantry (10 Battalions), 5,900 cavalry (27 escadrons), 10 guns
The Imperial forces: 6,200 infantry (6 Battalions), 1,200 cavalry (9 escadrons), 14 guns
The Rhine forces: 600 infantry (2 Battalions), 300 cavalry (4 escadrons)
The French forces: 3,500 infantry (4 Battalions), 1,750 cavalry (10 escadrons)
Other forces: 2,000 Croat cavalry (out of this a regiment), Hungarian foot soldiers in Szentgotthárd, and Esterházy, Batthyány and Nádasdy regiment's, Czech musketeers and the Italian (Piedmontish) infantry regiment (commander Marchese Pio de Savoya).

The Turks renewed their invasion in the spring of 1664. They besieged, conquered and destroyed Novi Zrin Fortress on the Mura river in northern Croatia at the very beginning of July. Montecuccoli was still waiting for help to arrive, and this delay was key to the defense of Austria. In July 1664 the Imperial forces were assembled and set out for the River Rába, which separated the Ottoman forces from the Austrian duchy itself. If the Turks were allowed to cross, they would threaten both Vienna and Graz. Montecuccoli intercepted the Turks before they crossed the river but the division of command made effective deployment of troops impossible.

On 1 August 1664, Ottoman forces crossed the river near the monastery of Saint Gotthard and beat the Austrians back. Although initially plagued by disunity, Montecuccoli was finally able to convince Coligny and Leopold Wilhelm of Baden-Baden (commander of the Imperial detachment) to mass their forces and attack the Ottoman troops, who were reorganizing in a nearby forest. The attack surprised the Turks, who fled in confusion back to the river, a large number drowning. The confusion caused by the fleeing troops prevented Ahmed Köprülü (Vizier 1661-1676) from sending the rest of his army across the river and he instead retired from the field.

Ottoman casualties were heavy, significantly falling mostly on the elite corps of the army. Köprülü was left with an army of ill-trained irregulars and auxiliaries while Montecuccoli's casualties were light and mostly in the Imperial contingent.

== Aftermath ==
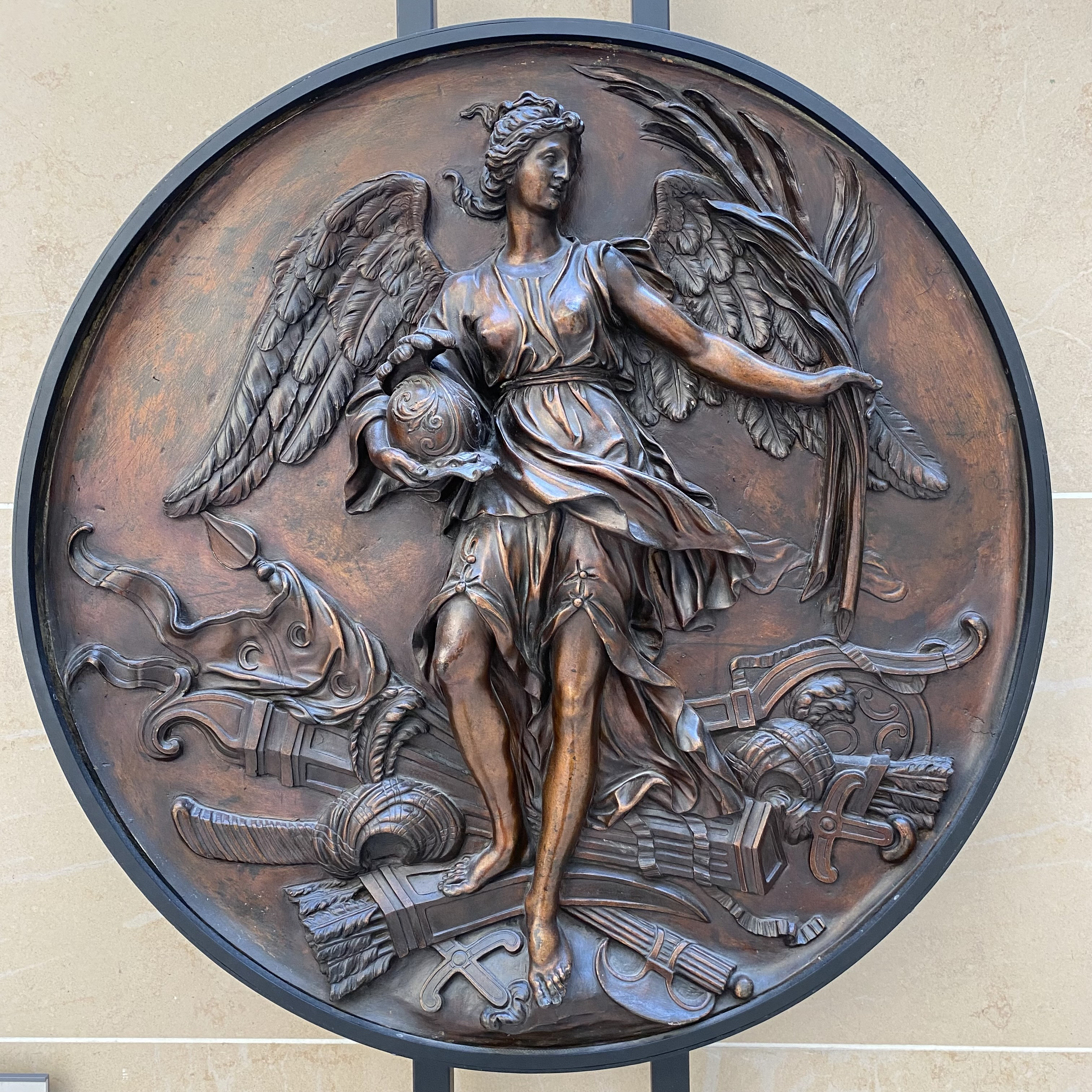
Allegorical representation of the Saint Gotthard victory and specifically of the French role in it, formerly part of Louis XIV Victory Monument in Paris

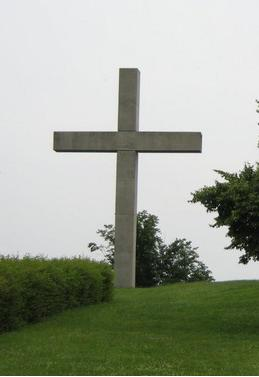
Stonecross of Schösslberg, over Mogersdorf; monument of the Battle of Saint Gotthard (1664).

Although many in Europe, especially the Croats and Hungarian nobility, expected the Austrian Habsburgs to finally liberate Hungary once and for all, Leopold abandoned the campaign. Many have criticized him for this decision (both in the past and the present). Although Montecuccoli's army was largely intact, there was no interest among the allies to liberate Hungary. Any invasion of Hungary would undoubtedly have to be done without the help of the French and German troops. Leopold noticed that the French officers had begun to fraternize with the Magyar nobles and encouraged them to rebel against Austrian rule.

In addition, Leopold had always been a member of the "Spanish faction" in Vienna. With the last Spanish Habsburg, Carlos II, about to die at any given moment, Leopold wanted to ensure that his hands were free for the inevitable struggle against Louis XIV of France. Although the liberation of Hungary was a strategic interest of the Habsburgs, it would have to wait until later. Throughout his reign, Leopold had always been more interested in the struggle against France rather than the Ottomans. Therefore, he signed the rather unfavourable Peace of Vasvár, which did not take into account the Battle of Saint Gotthard. The Battle of Saint Gotthard is still significant, however, for it stopped any Ottoman invasion of Austria, which certainly would have prolonged the war and led to a disastrous resolution. The Austrians would also use the twenty-year truce to build up their forces and begin the liberation of Hungary in 1683.

== In literature ==
The battle of Mogersdorf/Szentgotthárd provided Rainer Maria Rilke with the inspiration for his poetic short story, "Lay of the Love and Death of Cornet Christopher Rilke", which was very popular among German and Austrian soldiers during the first half of the 20th century.

== See also ==
- Louis XIV Victory Monument
- Battle of Saint Gotthard (1705)
