= Neuhaus am Klausenbach =

- Municipality
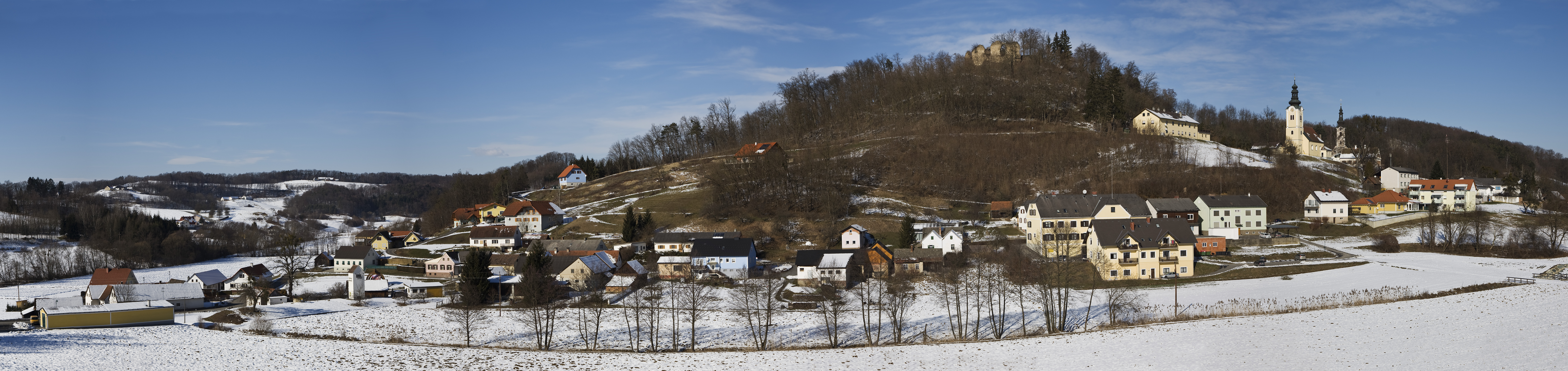
- Panoramic view of Neuhaus

- Coat of arms

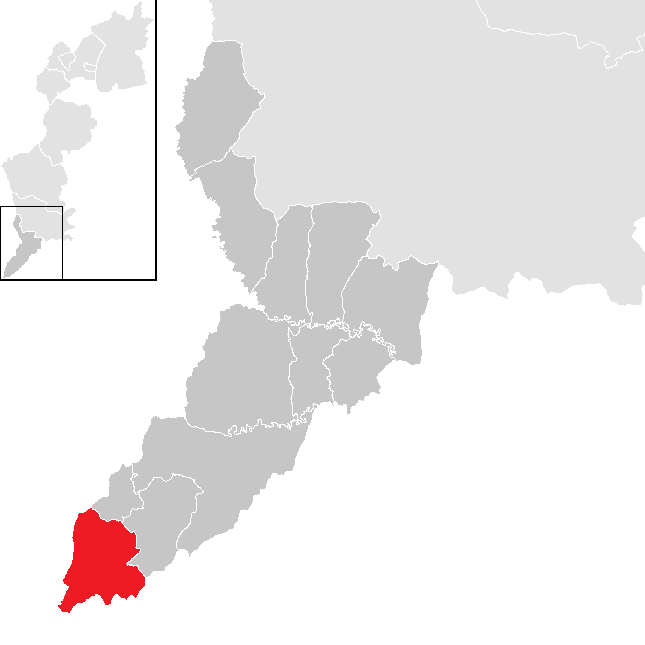
- Location within Jennersdorf district

- Location within Austria
- Coordinates: 46°52′N 16°2′E
- Country: Austria
- State: Burgenland
- District: Jennersdorf

Government
  - Mayor: Monika Pock (ÖVP)

Area
  - Total: 19.99 km^{2} (7.72 sq mi)
- Elevation: 292 m (958 ft)

Population (2018-01-01)
  - Total: 921
  - Density: 46.1/km^{2} (119/sq mi)
- Time zone: UTC+1 (CET)
  - Summer (DST): UTC+2 (CEST)
- Postal code: 8385
- Area code: +43 3329
- Website: www.neuhaus-klausenbach.at

Neuhaus am Klausenbach (Hungarian: Vasdobra, Vas-Dobra, Slovene: Dobra) is a town in the district of Jennersdorf in the Austrian state of Burgenland.

== Geography ==
Cadastral communities are Bonisdorf, Kalch, Krottendorf bei Neuhaus am Klausenbach and Neuhaus am Klausenbach.

== Population ==
Historical population
Year	Pop.	±%
1869	1,569	—
1880	1,646	+4.9%
1890	1,796	+9.1%
1900	1,728	−3.8%
1910	1,619	−6.3%
1923	1,598	−1.3%
1934	1,604	+0.4%
1939	1,452	−9.5%
1951	1,479	+1.9%
1961	1,428	−3.4%
1971	1,321	−7.5%
1981	1,250	−5.4%
1991	1,163	−7.0%
2001	1,064	−8.5%
2011	933	−12.3%
2016	950	+1.8%
