= Schlag bei Thalberg =

- Former municipality
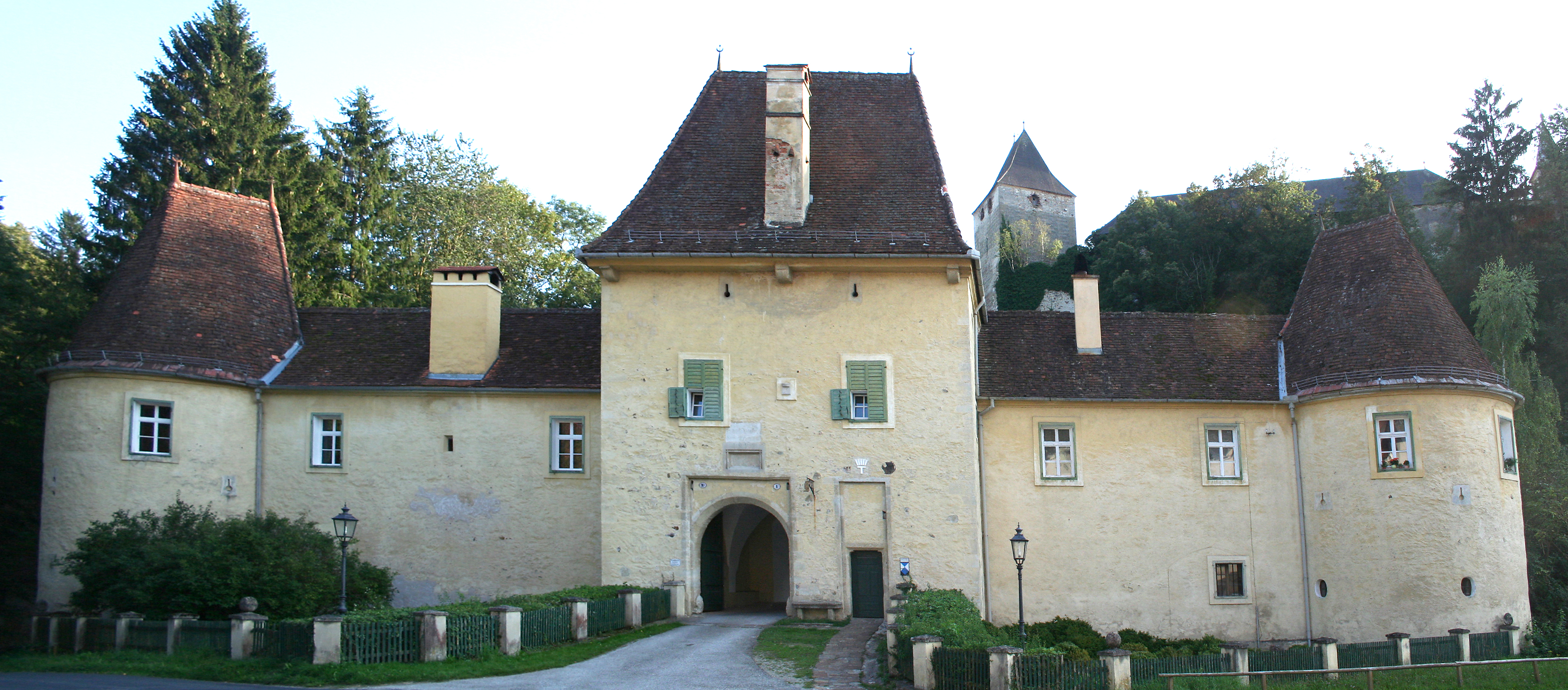
- Thalberg Castle

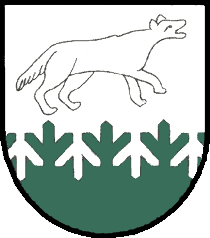
- Coat of arms

- Location within Austria
- Coordinates: 47°25′08″N 15°59′30″E
- Country: Austria
- State: Styria
- District: Hartberg-Fürstenfeld

Area
  - Total: 10.71 km^{2} (4.14 sq mi)
- Elevation: 461 m (1,512 ft)

Population (1 January 2016)
  - Total: 911
  - Density: 85.1/km^{2} (220/sq mi)
- Time zone: UTC+1 (CET)
  - Summer (DST): UTC+2 (CEST)
- Postal code: 8241, 8233, 8234
- Area code: 0 33 38
- Vehicle registration: HB
- Website: www.schlag-thalberg. steiermark.at

Schlag bei Thalberg is a former municipality in the district of Hartberg-Fürstenfeld in Styria, Austria. At the 2015 Styria municipal structural reform, it was divided between the municipalities Dechantskirchen and Rohrbach an der Lafnitz.
