= Mühlgraben =

- Municipality
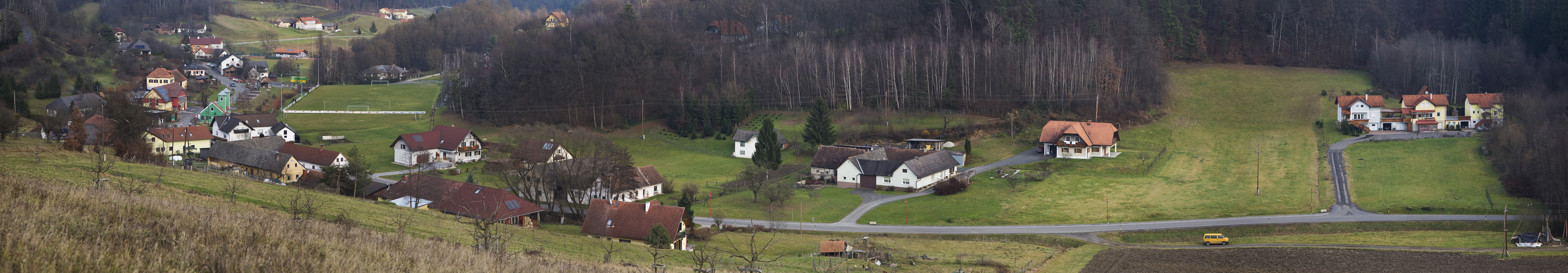
- Panoramic view of Mühlgraben

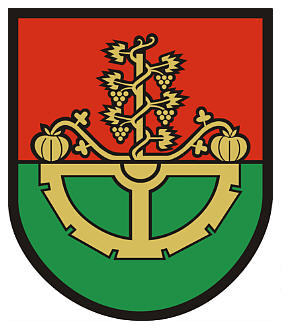
- Coat of arms

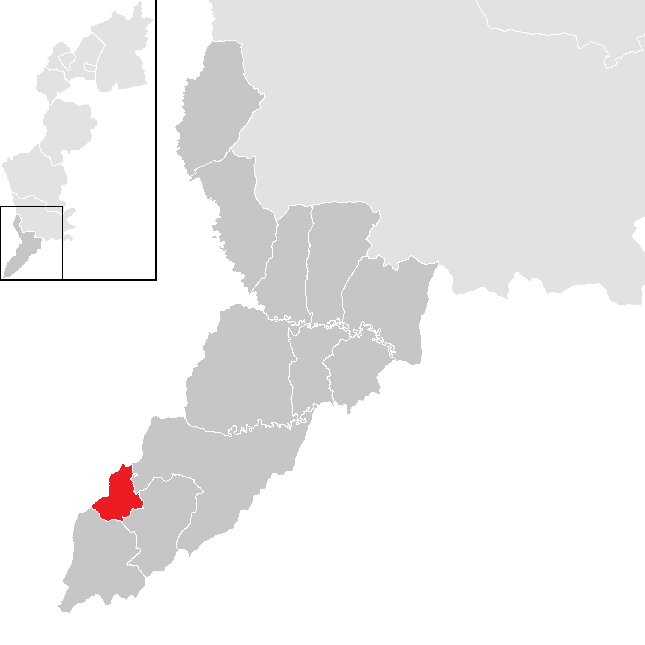
- Location within Jennersdorf district

- Location within Austria
- Coordinates: 46°53′N 16°3′E
- Country: Austria
- State: Burgenland
- District: Jennersdorf

Government
  - Mayor: Fabio Halb (SPÖ)

Area
  - Total: 5.55 km^{2} (2.14 sq mi)
- Elevation: 318 m (1,043 ft)

Population (2018-01-01)
  - Total: 396
  - Density: 71.4/km^{2} (185/sq mi)
- Time zone: UTC+1 (CET)
  - Summer (DST): UTC+2 (CEST)
- Postal code: 8385
- Website: www.muehlgraben.at

Mühlgraben (Slovene: Mlin-Grabno, Hungarian: Malomgödör) is a town in the district of Jennersdorf in the Austrian state of Burgenland.

== Population ==
Historical population
Year	Pop.	±%
1869	502	—
1880	560	+11.6%
1890	632	+12.9%
1900	578	−8.5%
1910	556	−3.8%
1923	559	+0.5%
1934	569	+1.8%
1939	507	−10.9%
1951	462	−8.9%
1961	455	−1.5%
1971	483	+6.2%
1981	467	−3.3%
1991	437	−6.4%
2001	450	+3.0%
2011	431	−4.2%
