= Minihof-Liebau =

- Municipality
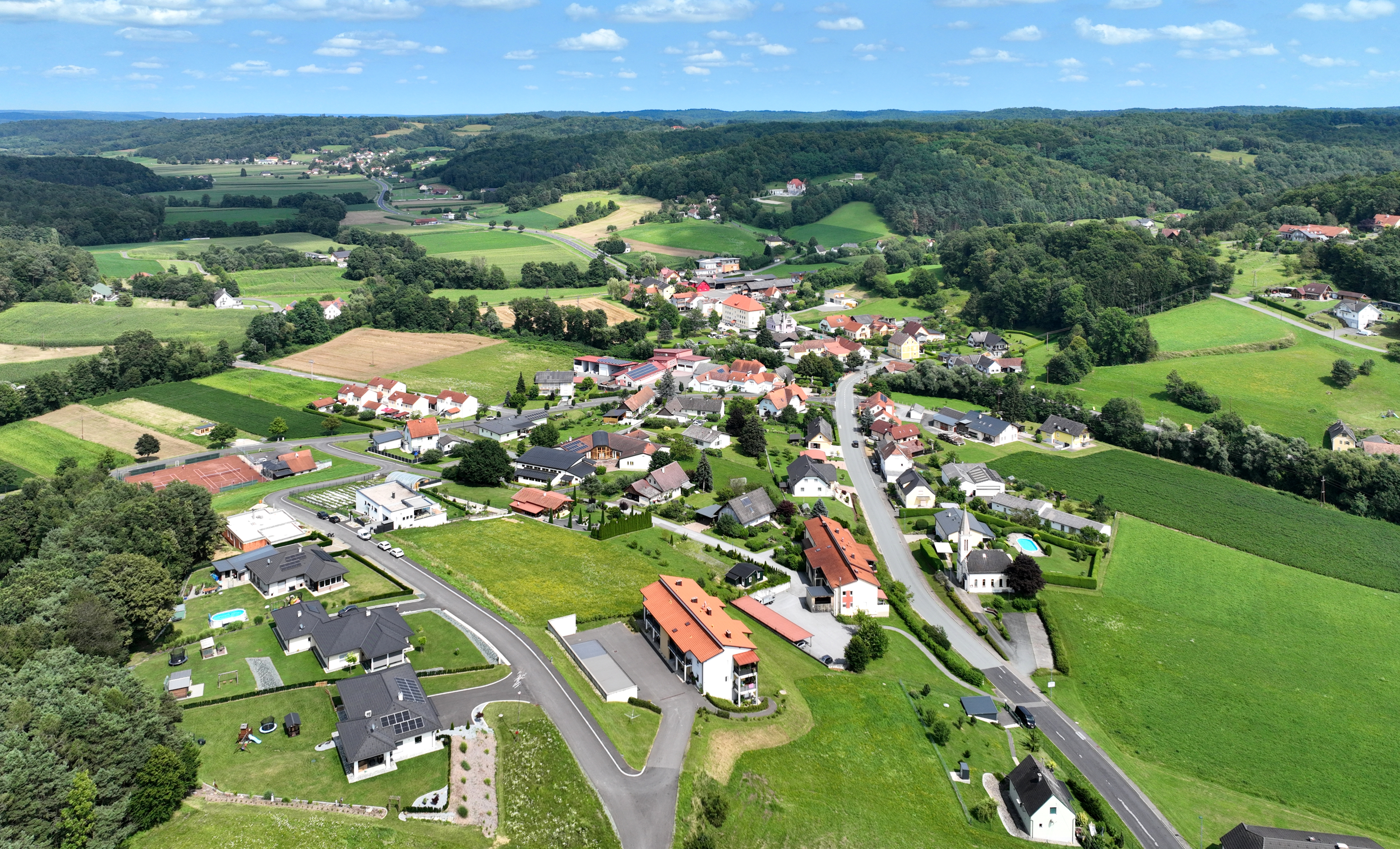
- West view of Minihof-Liebau

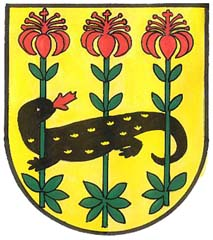
- Coat of arms

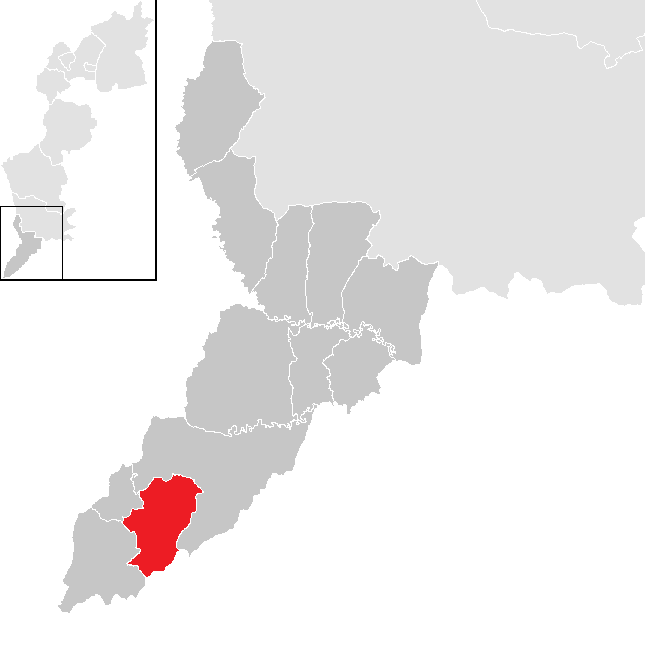
- Location within Jennersdorf district

- Location within Austria
- Coordinates: 46°53′N 16°4′E
- Country: Austria
- State: Burgenland
- District: Jennersdorf

Government
  - Mayor: Helmut Sampt (SPÖ)

Area
  - Total: 16.27 km^{2} (6.28 sq mi)
- Elevation: 285 m (935 ft)

Population (2018-01-01)
  - Total: 1,054
  - Density: 64.78/km^{2} (167.8/sq mi)
- Time zone: UTC+1 (CET)
  - Summer (DST): UTC+2 (CEST)
- Postal code: 8384
- Website: https://minihof-liebau.at/

Minihof-Liebau (Hungarian: Liba, Slovene: Suhi mlin) is a town in the district of Jennersdorf in the Austrian state of Burgenland.

== Geography ==
Cadastral communities are Minihof-Liebau, Tauka and Windisch-Minihof.

== Population ==
Historical population
Year	Pop.	±%
1869	1,286	—
1880	1,378	+7.2%
1890	1,512	+9.7%
1900	1,530	+1.2%
1910	1,455	−4.9%
1923	1,371	−5.8%
1934	1,343	−2.0%
1939	1,266	−5.7%
1951	1,267	+0.1%
1961	1,200	−5.3%
1971	1,196	−0.3%
1981	1,141	−4.6%
1991	1,103	−3.3%
2001	1,179	+6.9%
2011	1,115	−5.4%
