= Sankt Martin an der Raab =

- Municipality
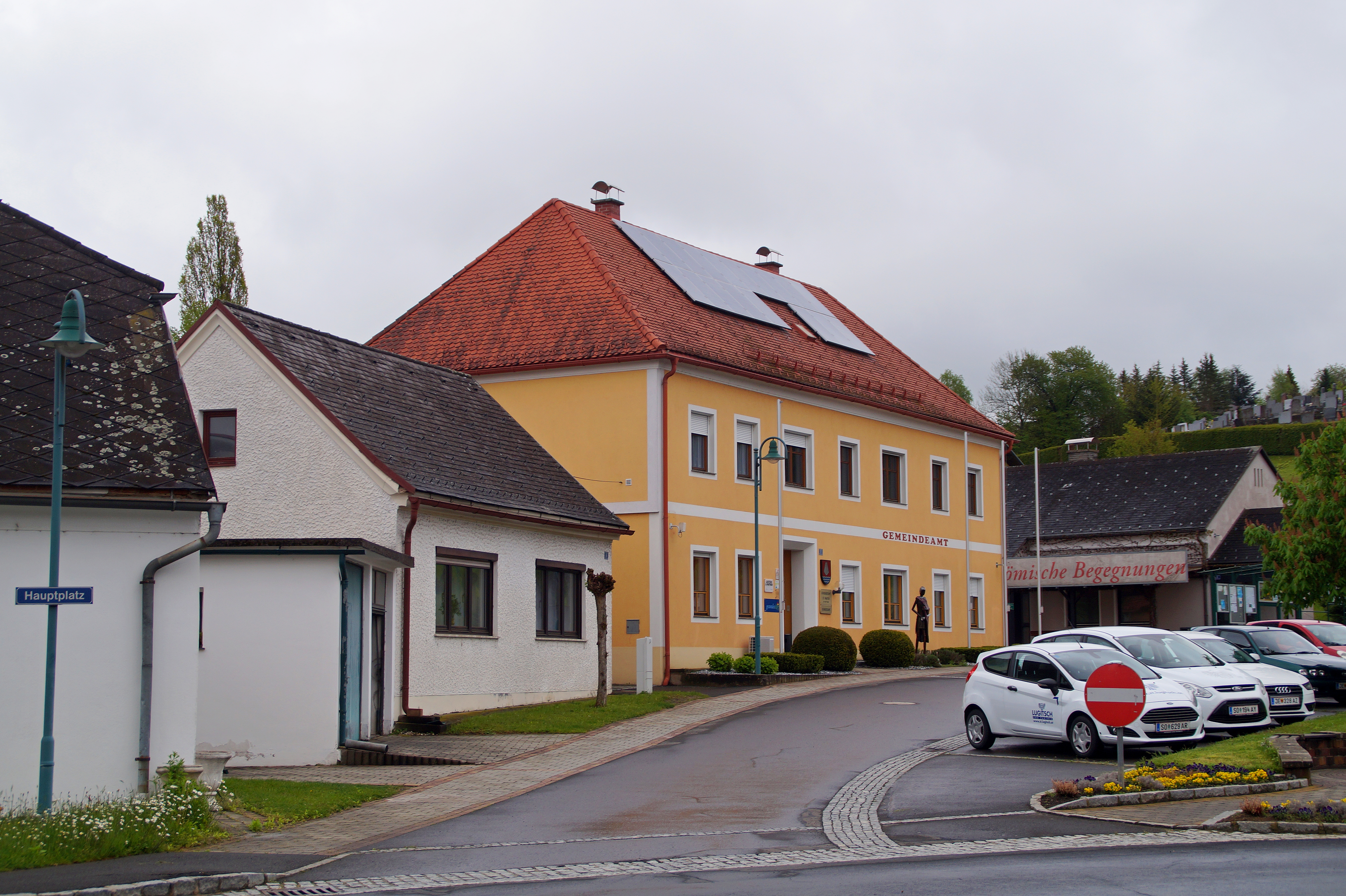
- Main square and town hall

- Coat of arms

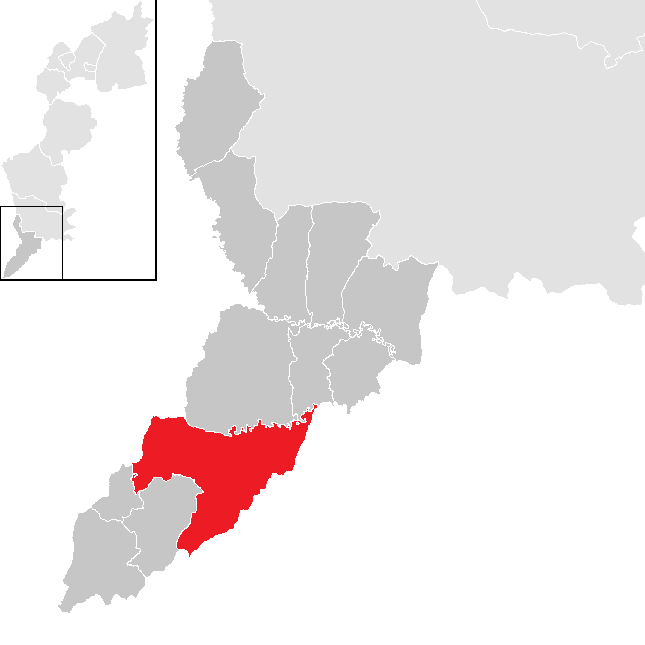
- Location within Jennersdorf district

- Location within Austria
- Coordinates: 46°55′N 16°8′E
- Country: Austria
- State: Burgenland
- District: Jennersdorf

Government
  - Mayor: Franz Josef Kern (SPÖ)

Area
  - Total: 43.01 km^{2} (16.61 sq mi)
- Elevation: 250 m (820 ft)

Population (2018-01-01)
  - Total: 1,959
  - Density: 45.55/km^{2} (118.0/sq mi)
- Time zone: UTC+1 (CET)
  - Summer (DST): UTC+2 (CEST)
- Postal code: 8383
- Website: https://st-martin-raab.at/

Sankt Martin an der Raab (Hungarian: Rábaszentmárton, Rába-Szentmárton, Slovene: Sveti Martin pri Rabi) is a town in the district of Jennersdorf in the Austrian state of Burgenland.

== Geography ==
Cadastral communities are Doiber, Gritsch, Neumarkt an der Raab, Oberdrosen, Sankt Martin an der Raab and Welten.

== Population ==
Historical population
Year	Pop.	±%
1869	3,518	—
1880	3,506	−0.3%
1890	3,605	+2.8%
1900	3,590	−0.4%
1910	3,533	−1.6%
1923	3,295	−6.7%
1934	3,172	−3.7%
1939	2,990	−5.7%
1951	2,725	−8.9%
1961	2,458	−9.8%
1971	2,595	+5.6%
1981	2,428	−6.4%
1991	2,189	−9.8%
2001	2,095	−4.3%
2011	2,053	−2.0%
