= Jennersdorf District =

Coordinates: 46.948°N 16.140°E

Jennersdorf District Bezirk Jennersdorf
- District
- Country: Austria
- State: Burgenland
- Number of municipalities: 12
- Administrative seat: Jennersdorf

Government
  - District Governor: Hermann Prem

Area
  - Total: 253.42 km^{2} (97.85 sq mi)

Population (2022)
  - Total: 17,158
  - Density: 67.706/km^{2} (175.36/sq mi)
- Time zone: UTC+01:00 (CET)
  - Summer (DST): UTC+02:00 (CEST)
- Vehicle registration: JE
- NUTS code: AT113

The Bezirk Jennersdorf (Hungarian: Gyanafalvi járás, Croatian: Kotar Jennersdorf, Slovene: Okrožje Ženavci) is a district of the state of Burgenland in Austria. The district has a population of 17,158, as of 2022, and an area of 253km. The district is the southernmost in Burgenland. The largest settlement in the district is Jennersdorf, followed by Rudersdorf and Sankt Martin an der Raab. The district contains the lowest percentage of young people in Austria, with 15.5% of the population of the district under 20 years old.

== Administrative divisions ==
The district consists of the below municipalities and towns.

- Deutsch Kaltenbrunn
- Rohrbrunn
- Eltendorf
- Heiligenkreuz im Lafnitztal
- Jennersdorf
- Königsdorf
- Minihof-Liebau
- Mogersdorf
- Mühlgraben
- Neuhaus am Klausenbach
- Rudersdorf
- Sankt Martin an der Raab
- Weichselbaum
