= Eichberg, Styria =

Eichberg
- Former municipality
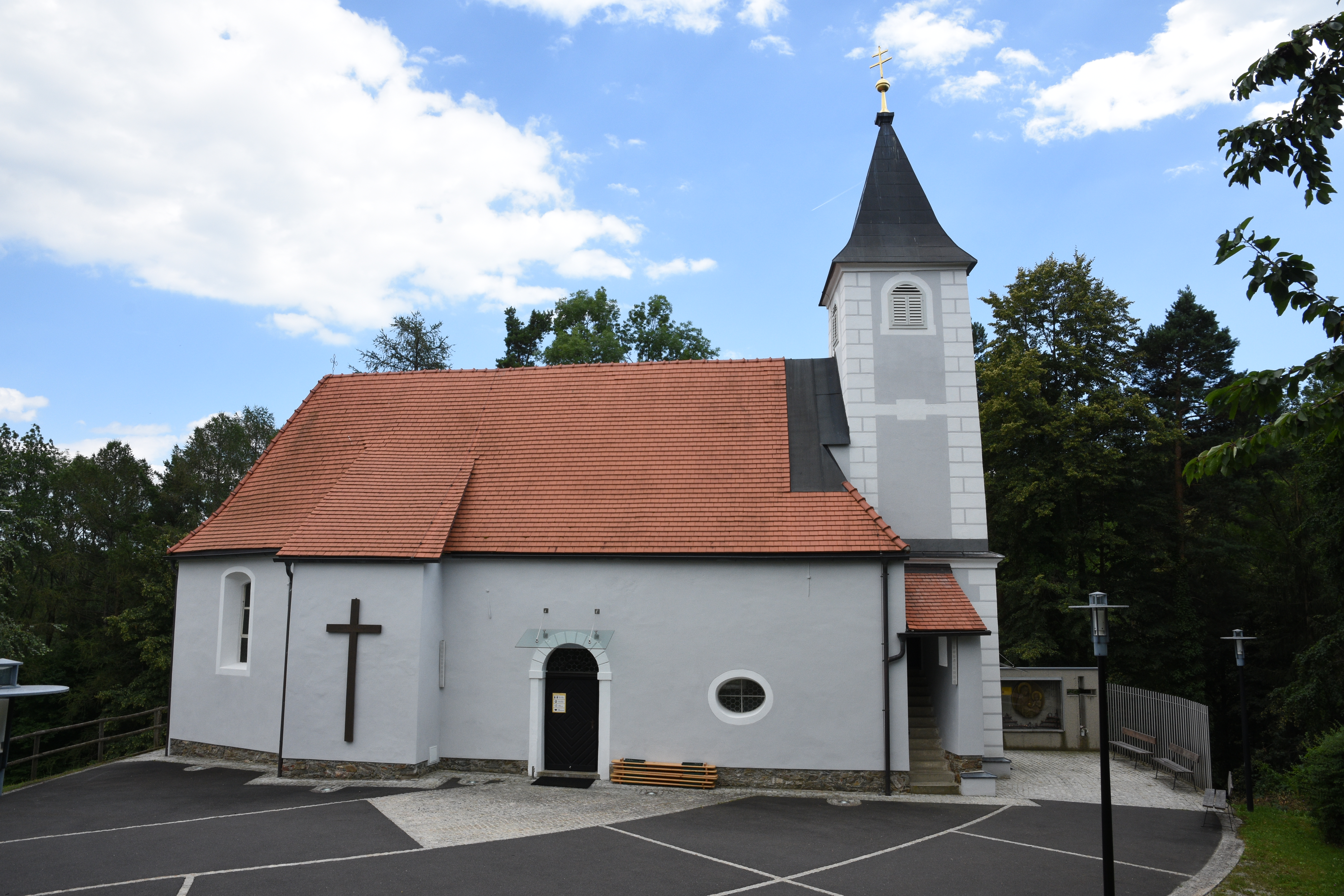
- Eichberg parish church

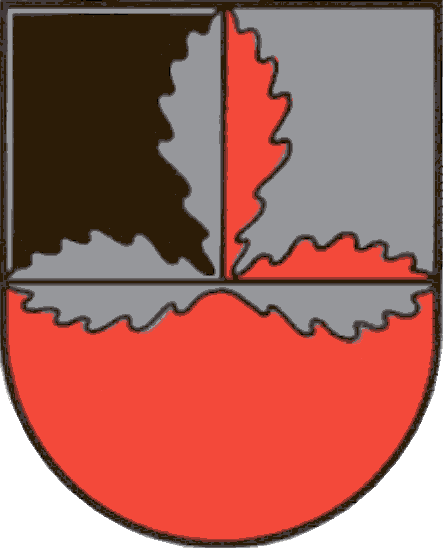
- Coat of arms

- Location within Austria
- Coordinates: 47°22′53″N 15°58′24″E
- Country: Austria
- State: Styria
- District: Hartberg-Fürstenfeld

Area
  - Total: 18.47 km^{2} (7.13 sq mi)
- Elevation: 578 m (1,896 ft)

Population (1 January 2016)
  - Total: 1,178
  - Density: 63.78/km^{2} (165.2/sq mi)
- Time zone: UTC+1 (CET)
  - Summer (DST): UTC+2 (CEST)
- Postal code: 8234, 8250
- Area code: 03338
- Vehicle registration: HB
- Website: www.eichberg.at

Eichberg is a former municipality in the district of Hartberg-Fürstenfeld in Styria, Austria. Since the 2015 Styria municipal structural reform, it has been part of the municipality of Rohrbach an der Lafnitz.
