= Lafnitz =

- Municipality
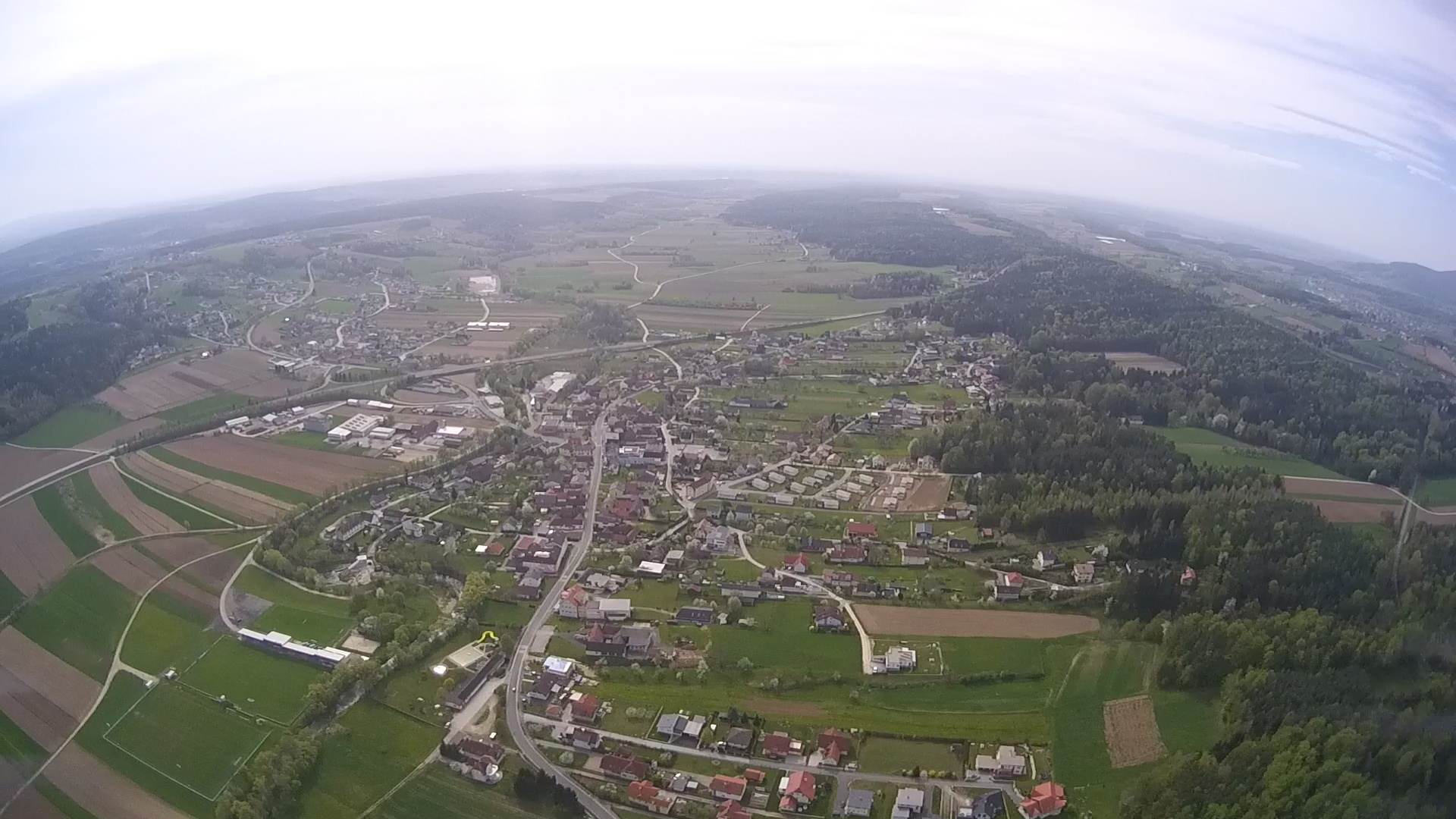

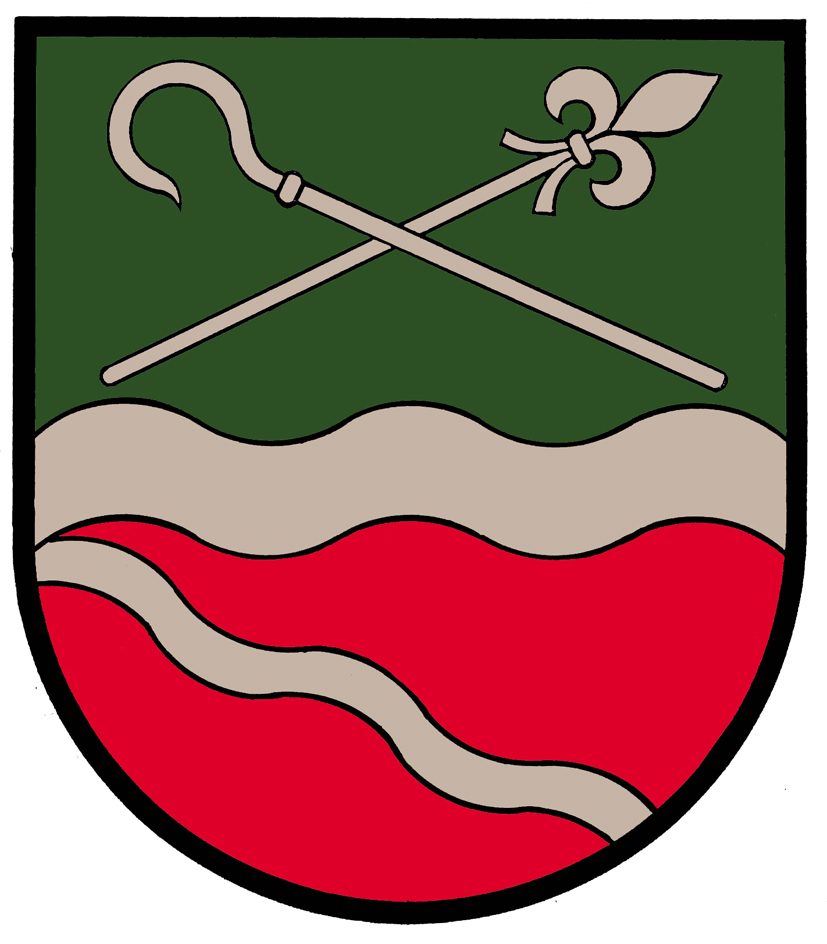
- Coat of arms

- Location within Austria
- Coordinates: 47°22′09″N 16°00′46″E
- Country: Austria
- State: Styria
- District: Hartberg-Fürstenfeld

Government
  - Mayor: Hans Hammer (SPÖ)

Area
  - Total: 15.54 km^{2} (6.00 sq mi)
- Elevation: 412 m (1,352 ft)

Population (2018-01-01)
  - Total: 1,451
  - Density: 93.37/km^{2} (241.8/sq mi)
- Time zone: UTC+1 (CET)
  - Summer (DST): UTC+2 (CEST)
- Postal code: 8233, 8230
- Area code: 03338
- Vehicle registration: HB
- Website: www.lafnitz.at

Lafnitz (German pronunciation: [ˈlafnɪt͡s]) is a municipality in the district of Hartberg-Fürstenfeld in Styria, Austria. It is situated on the upper course of the river Lafnitz.
