= Wörth an der Lafnitz =

- Former municipality
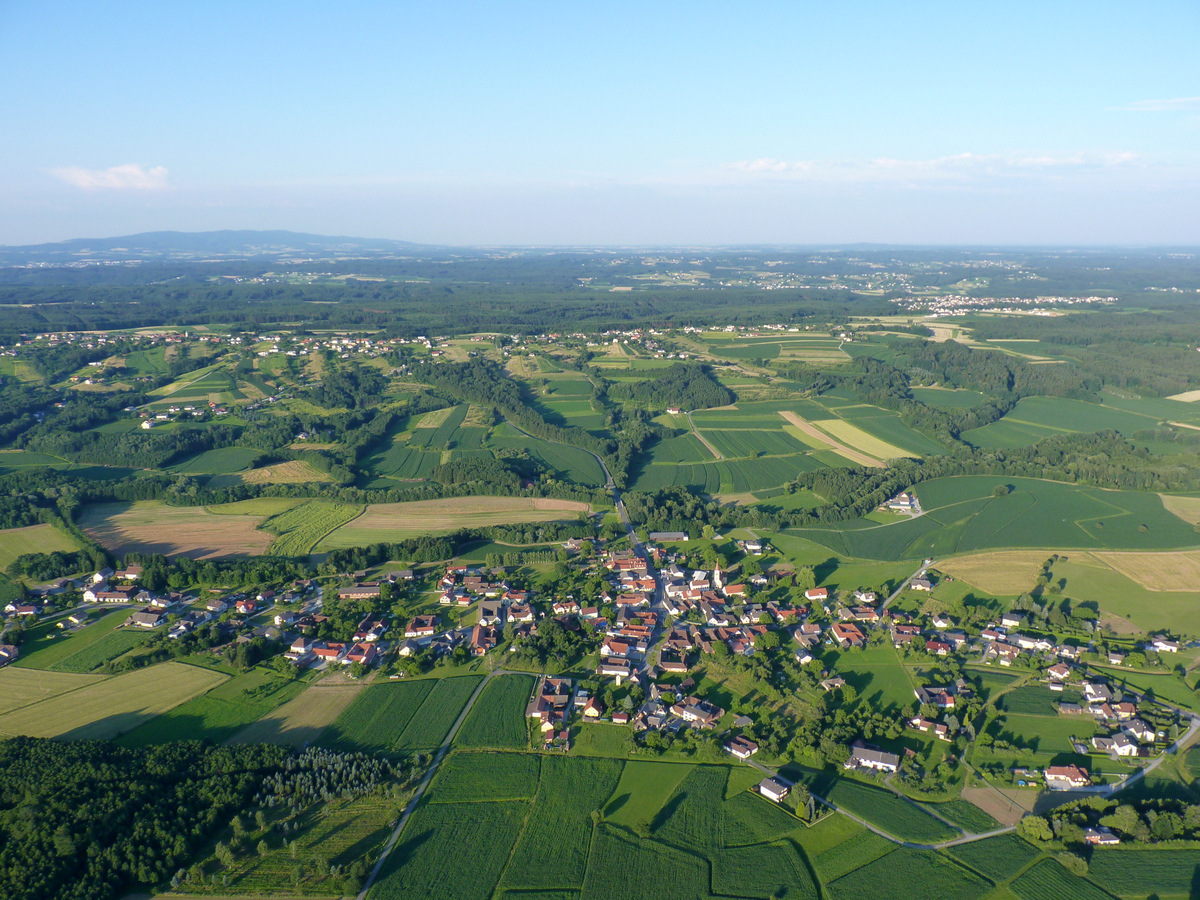
- Aerial view of Wörth an der Lafnitz

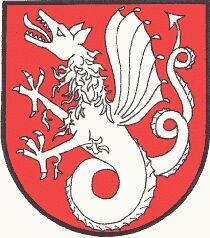
- Coat of arms

- Location within Austria
- Coordinates: 47°12′46″N 16°04′52″E
- Country: Austria
- State: Styria
- District: Hartberg-Fürstenfeld

Area
  - Total: 10.93 km^{2} (4.22 sq mi)
- Elevation: 330 m (1,080 ft)

Population (1 January 2016)
  - Total: 379
  - Density: 34.7/km^{2} (89.8/sq mi)
- Time zone: UTC+1 (CET)
  - Summer (DST): UTC+2 (CEST)
- Postal code: 8293
- Area code: 03332
- Vehicle registration: HB
- Website: www.woerth-lafnitz. steiermark.at

Wörth an der Lafnitz is a former municipality in the district of Hartberg-Fürstenfeld in Styria, Austria. Since the 2015 Styria municipal structural reform, it is part of the municipality Rohr bei Hartberg.
