= Eltendorf =

- Municipality
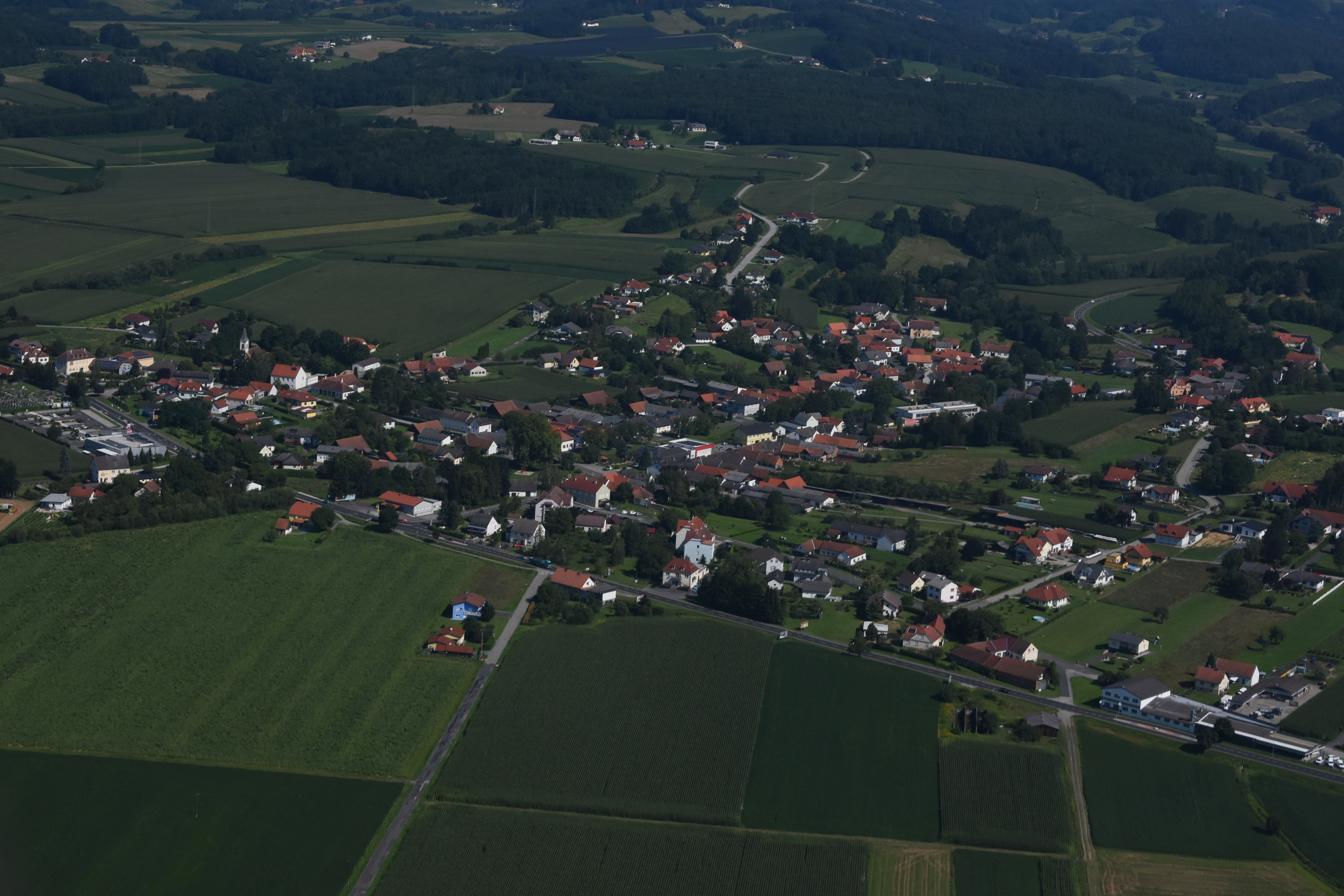
- Aerial view

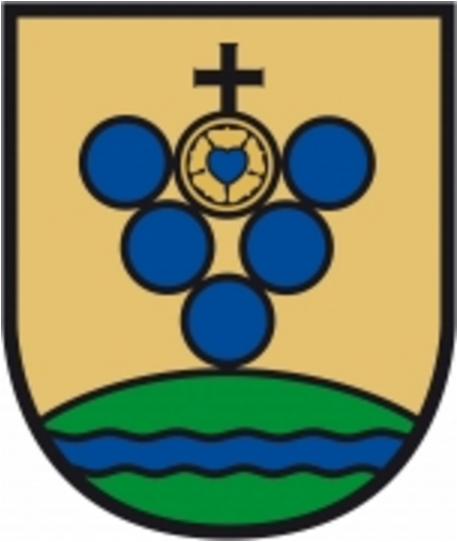
- Coat of arms

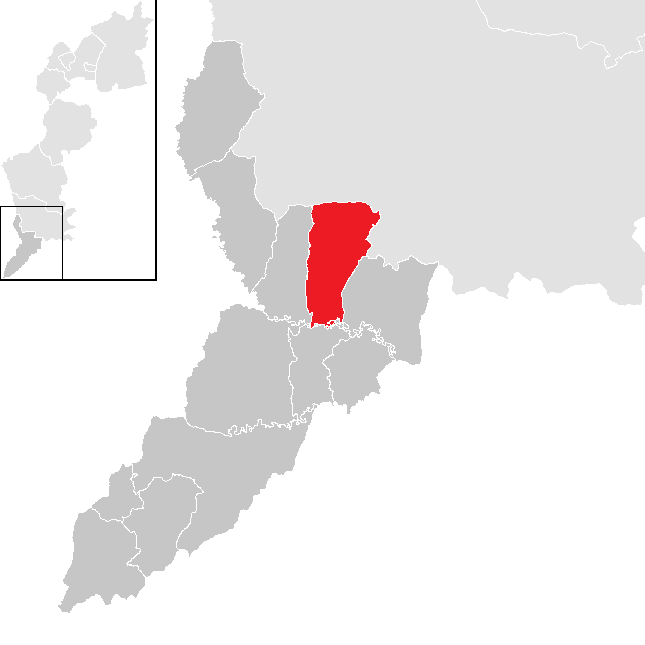
- Location within Jennersdorf district

- Location within Austria
- Coordinates: 47°1′N 16°12′E
- Country: Austria
- State: Burgenland
- District: Jennersdorf

Government
  - Mayor: Christian Schaberl (LBL)

Area
  - Total: 20.58 km^{2} (7.95 sq mi)
- Elevation: 246 m (807 ft)

Population (2018-01-01)
  - Total: 954
  - Density: 46.4/km^{2} (120/sq mi)
- Time zone: UTC+1 (CET)
  - Summer (DST): UTC+2 (CEST)
- Postal code: 7562
- Website: https://www.eltendorf.at/

Eltendorf (Hungarian: Ókörtvélyes, Ó-Körtvélyes, Slovene: Gruškova Ves) is a town in the district of Jennersdorf in the Austrian state of Burgenland.

== Geography ==
Cadastral communities are Eltendorf and Zahling.

== Population ==
Historical population
Year	Pop.	±%
1869	1,884	—
1880	1,885	+0.1%
1890	1,935	+2.7%
1900	1,678	−13.3%
1910	1,652	−1.5%
1923	1,465	−11.3%
1934	1,886	+28.7%
1939	1,448	−23.2%
1951	1,267	−12.5%
1961	1,217	−3.9%
1971	1,122	−7.8%
1981	1,029	−8.3%
1991	977	−5.1%
2001	1,017	+4.1%
2011	968	−4.8%
