= Deutsch Kaltenbrunn =

- Municipality
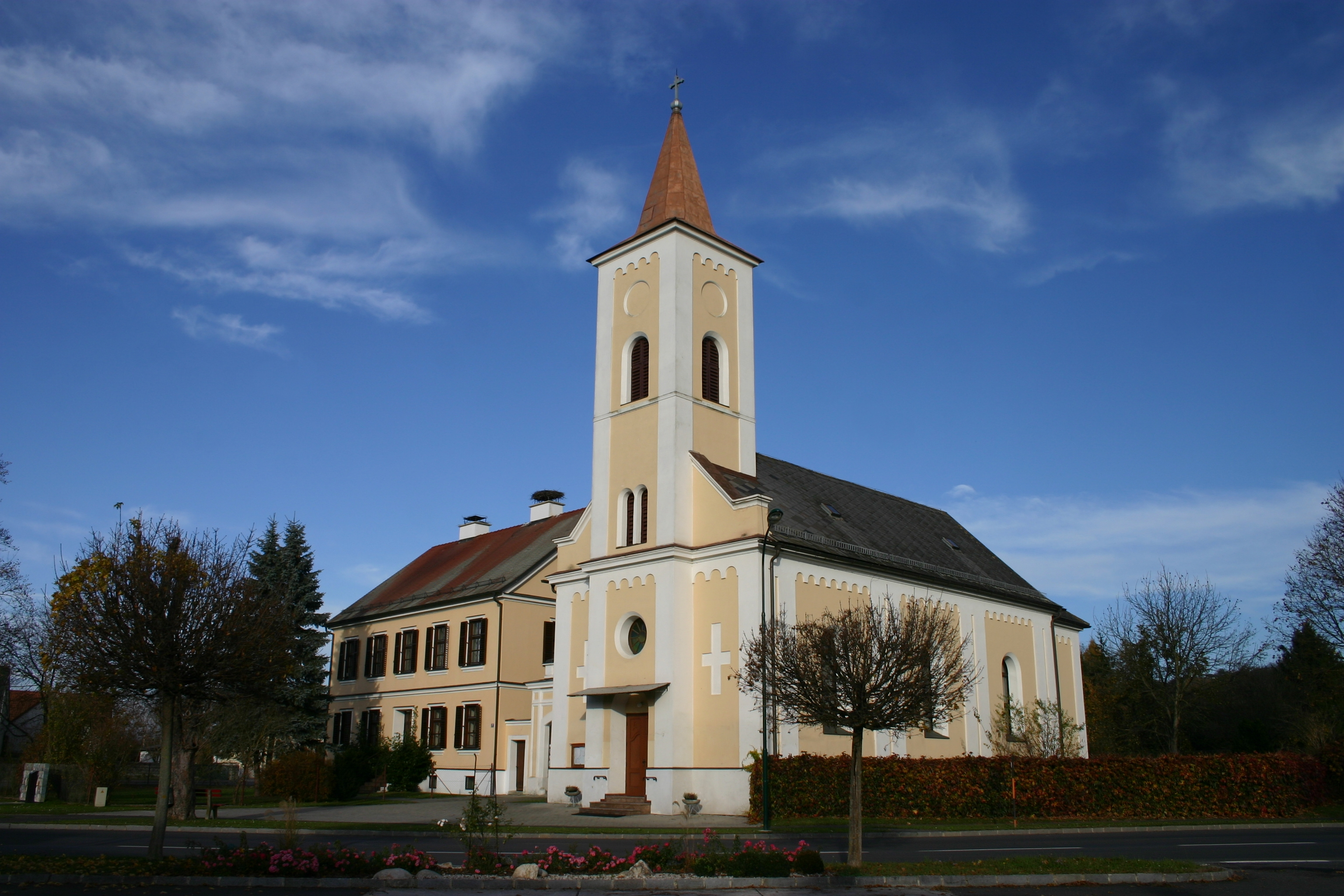
- Saint Nicholas's Church

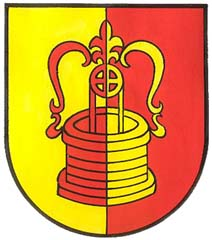
- Coat of arms

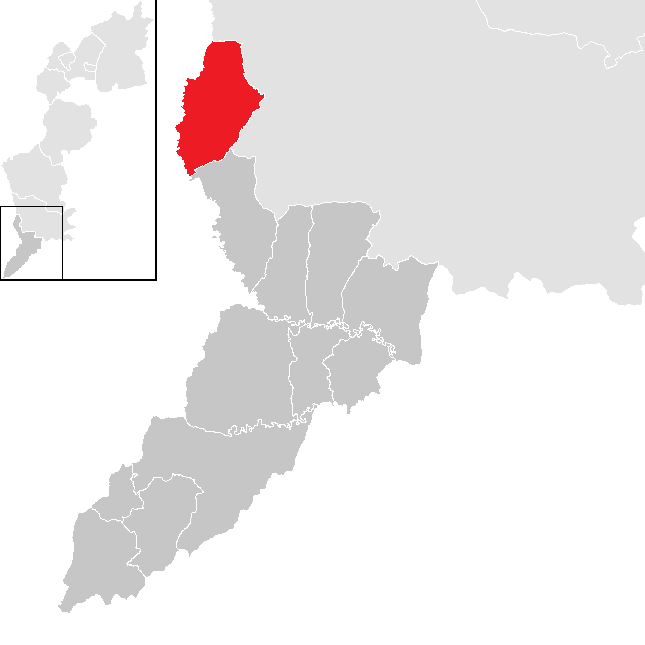
- Location within Jennersdorf district

- Location within Austria
- Coordinates: 47°5′N 16°6′E
- Country: Austria
- State: Burgenland
- District: Jennersdorf

Government
  - Mayor: Andrea Reichl (SPÖ)

Area
  - Total: 24.19 km^{2} (9.34 sq mi)
- Elevation: 262 m (860 ft)

Population (2018-01-01)
  - Total: 1,721
  - Density: 71.15/km^{2} (184.3/sq mi)
- Time zone: UTC+1 (CET)
  - Summer (DST): UTC+2 (CEST)
- Postal code: 7572
- Website: https://www.deutschkaltenbrunn.eu/

Deutsch Kaltenbrunn (Hungarian: Némethidegkút, Német-Hidegkút, Slovene: Mrzli Most) is a town in the district of Jennersdorf in Burgenland in Austria.

== Geography ==
Cadastral communities are Deutsch Kaltenbrunn and Rohrbrunn.

== Population ==
Historical population
Year	Pop.	±%
1981	1,948	—
1991	1,836	−5.7%
2001	1,828	−0.4%
2011	1,770	−3.2%
