= Battle of Saint Gotthard (1705) =

1705 battle of Rákóczi's War for Hungarian Independence

- Part of the Rákóczi's War for Independence
Date	13 December 1705
Location	near Szentgotthárd and Nagyfalu (Mogersdorf), the Austro-Hungarian border
Result	Kuruc victory

Belligerents
Hungary	Habsburg monarchy Croatia; Serbs

Commanders and leaders
János Bottyán (Bottyán the Blind); Imre Bezerédj, brigadier	Hannibal Heister

The Battle of Saint Gotthard was fought on 13 December 1705 between a Hungarian (Kuruc) army led by János Bottyán and an Austrian-Croatian-Serbian combined army under the command of Hannibal Heister. The battle took place at Szentgotthárd (West-Hungary, County Vas) and Nagyfalva (Mogersdorf) (today Austria), near the Austro-Hungarian border. The result of the battle was a Hungarian victory.

On 2 November 1705 János Bottyán started the Hungarian campaign in Transdanubia. Before that he had only 8,000 soldiers at Kecskemét but this number later increased to 30,000 men.

On 10 December Kőszeg capitulated and Bottyán moved to Szentgotthárd, where Heister was. Between Mogersdorf and Szentgotthárd, the Kuruc Army attacked the Austrians (the Habsburg army also contained several Croatian and Serbian units).

After being defeated in the battle, Heister retreated to Stadtschlaining (Szalonak), and Transdanubia was liberated.
