= Weichselbaum =

- Municipality
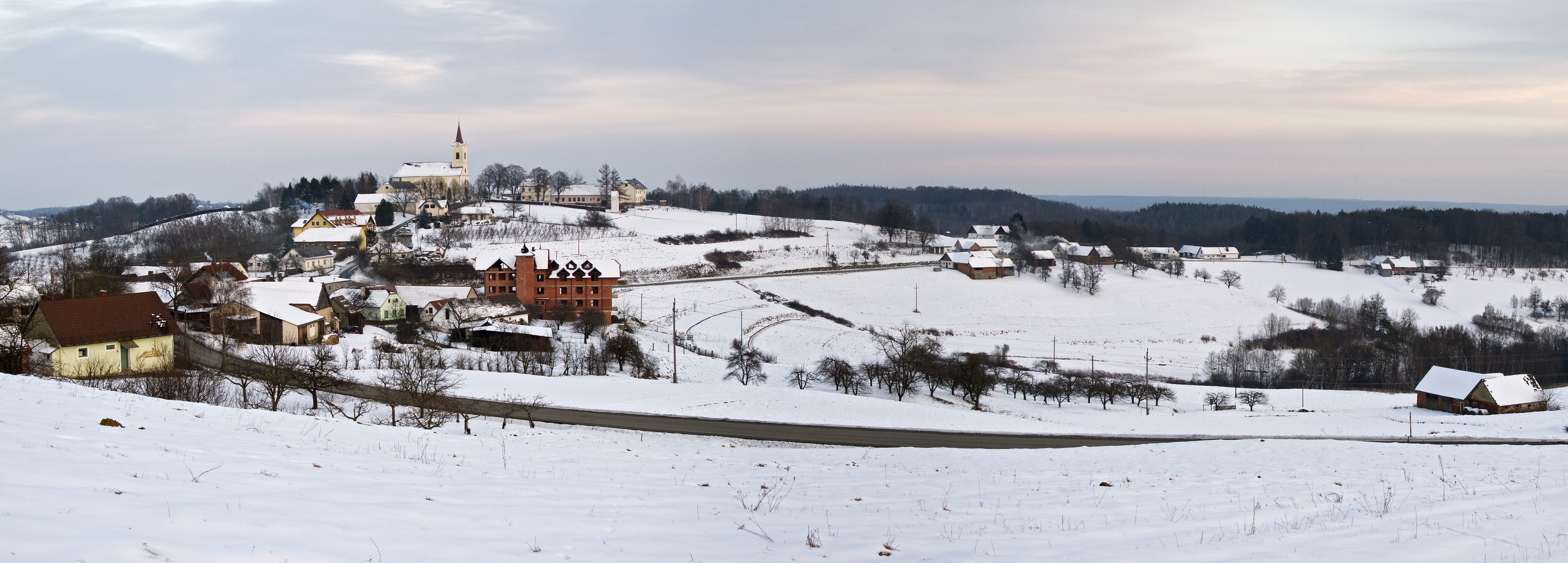

- Coat of arms

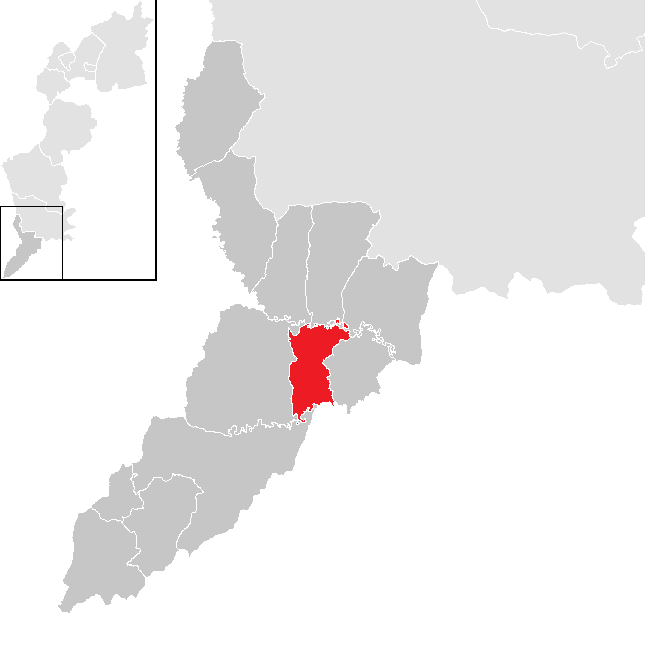
- Location within Jennersdorf district

- Location within Austria
- Coordinates: 46°57′N 16°11′E
- Country: Austria
- State: Burgenland
- District: Jennersdorf

Government
  - Mayor: Harald Brunner (ÖVP)

Area
  - Total: 12.17 km^{2} (4.70 sq mi)
- Elevation: 239 m (784 ft)

Population (2018-01-01)
  - Total: 720
  - Density: 59/km^{2} (150/sq mi)
- Time zone: UTC+1 (CET)
  - Summer (DST): UTC+2 (CEST)
- Postal code: 8382
- Area code: +43 3329
- Website: http://www.gemeinde-weichselbaum.at/

Weichselbaum (Hungarian: Badafalva, Slovene: Badavci) is a town in the district of Jennersdorf in the Austrian state of Burgenland.

== Geography ==
Cadastral communities are Krobotek, Rosendorf and Weichselbaum.

== Toponymy ==
Weichselbaum is a common surname in Austria. The meaning of Weichselbaum in the English language is sour cherry tree.

== Population ==
Historical population
Year	Pop.	±%
1869	1,388	—
1880	1,536	+10.7%
1890	1,597	+4.0%
1900	1,640	+2.7%
1910	1,639	−0.1%
1923	1,407	−14.2%
1934	1,299	−7.7%
1939	1,306	+0.5%
1951	1,190	−8.9%
1961	1,111	−6.6%
1971	1,047	−5.8%
1981	983	−6.1%
1991	884	−10.1%
2001	796	−10.0%
2011	732	−8.0%
2016	729	−0.4%
