= Heiligenkreuz im Lafnitztal =

- Municipality
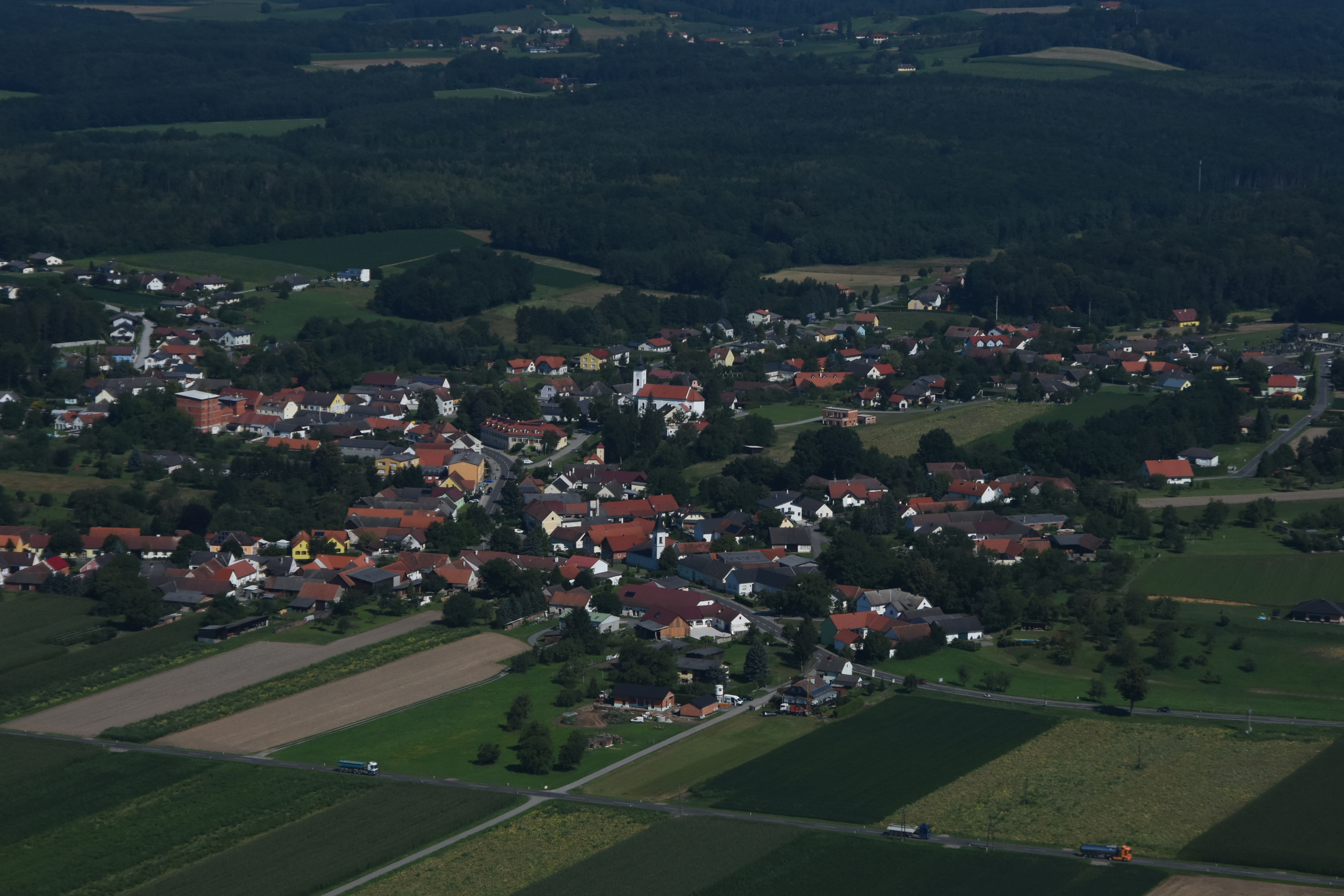
- Aerial view

- Flag Coat of arms

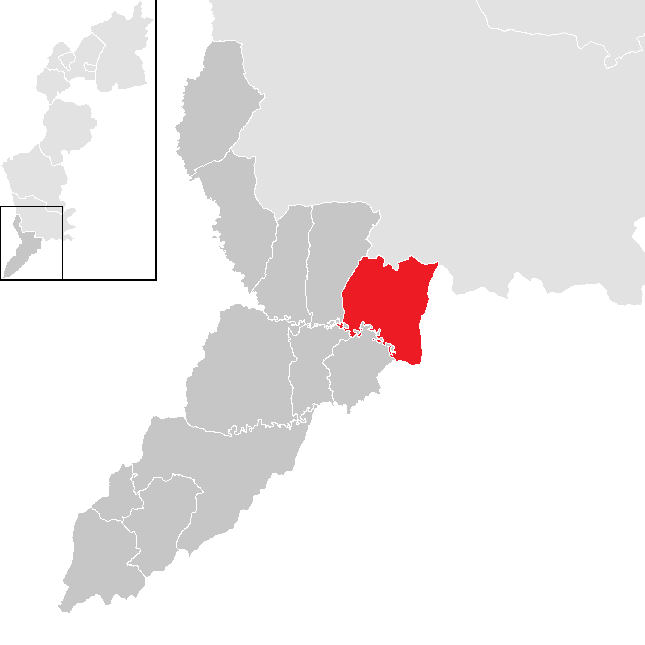
- Location within Jennersdorf district

- Location within Austria
- Coordinates: 46°59′N 16°16′E
- Country: Austria
- State: Burgenland
- District: Jennersdorf

Government
  - Mayor: Eduard Zach (SPÖ)

Area
  - Total: 23.78 km^{2} (9.18 sq mi)
- Elevation: 243 m (797 ft)

Population (2018-01-01)
  - Total: 1,231
  - Density: 51.77/km^{2} (134.1/sq mi)
- Time zone: UTC+1 (CET)
  - Summer (DST): UTC+2 (CEST)
- Postal code: 7561
- Website: http://www.heiligenkreuz-lafnitztal.at/

Heiligenkreuz im Lafnitztal (Hungarian: Rábakeresztúr, Rába-Keresztúr, Slovene: Sveti Križ) is a town in the district of Jennersdorf in the Austrian state of Burgenland close to the Austria/Hungary border.

== Geography ==
Cadastral communities are Heiligenkreuz im Lafnitztal and Poppendorf im Burgenland.

== Population ==
Historical population
| Year | Pop. | ±% |
|---|---|---|
| 1869 | 1,878 | — |
| 1880 | 1,935 | +3.0% |
| 1900 | 2,079 | +7.4% |
| 1910 | 2,173 | +4.5% |
| 1923 | 2,010 | −7.5% |
| 1934 | 1,942 | −3.4% |
| 1939 | 2,001 | +3.0% |
| 1951 | 1,890 | −5.5% |
| 1961 | 1,721 | −8.9% |
| 1971 | 1,574 | −8.5% |
| 1981 | 1,512 | −3.9% |
| 1991 | 1,420 | −6.1% |
| 2001 | 1,242 | −12.5% |
| 2011 | 1,268 | +2.1% |
