= Rudersdorf =

- Municipality
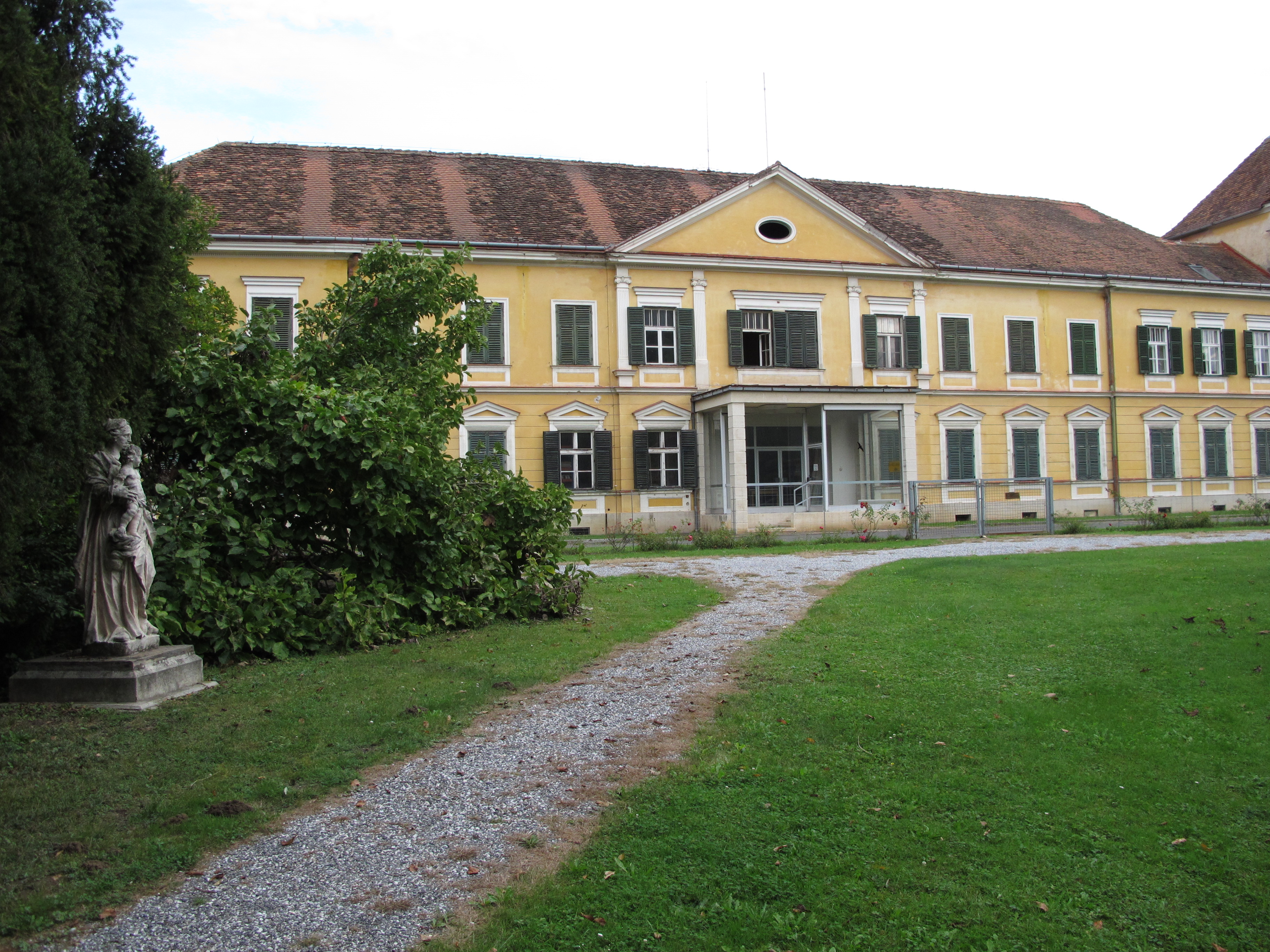
- Former Batthyány Castle in Rudersdorf

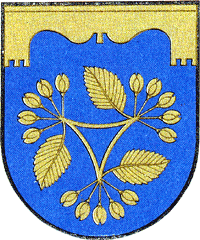
- Coat of arms

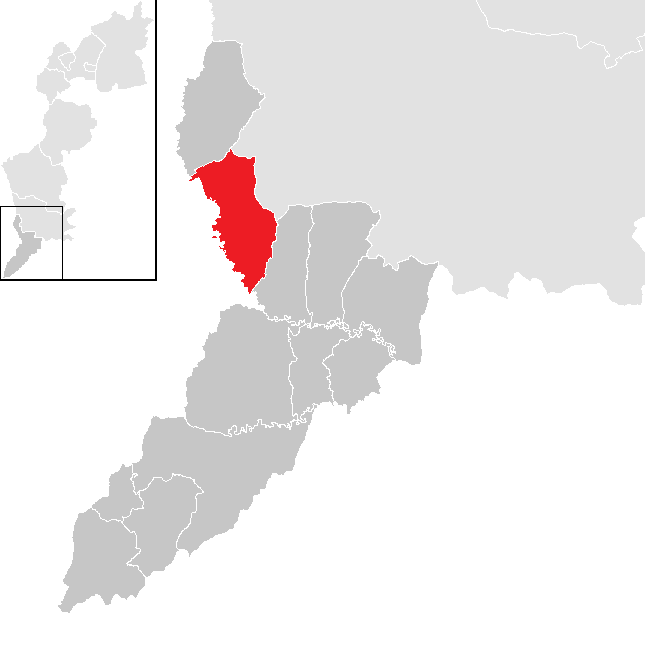
- Location within Jennersdorf district

- Location within Austria
- Coordinates: 47°3′N 16°7′E
- Country: Austria
- State: Burgenland
- District: Jennersdorf

Government
  - Mayor: Manuel Weber (ÖVP)

Area
  - Total: 21.44 km^{2} (8.28 sq mi)
- Elevation: 248 m (814 ft)

Population (2018-01-01)
  - Total: 2,176
  - Density: 101.5/km^{2} (262.9/sq mi)
- Time zone: UTC+1 (CET)
  - Summer (DST): UTC+2 (CEST)
- Postal code: 7571
- Website: www.rudersdorf.at

Rudersdorf (Austrian German pronunciation: [ˈruːdɐsdɔrf]; Hungarian: Radafalva, Slovene: Radavci) is a town in the district of Jennersdorf in the Austrian state of Burgenland.

== Geography ==
Cadastral communities are Dobersdorf (Gemeinde Rudersdorf) and Rudersdorf.

== Population ==
Historical population
Year	Pop.	±%
1869	2,208	—
1880	2,320	+5.1%
1890	2,457	+5.9%
1900	2,507	+2.0%
1910	2,456	−2.0%
1923	2,241	−8.8%
1934	2,194	−2.1%
1939	2,195	+0.0%
1951	1,889	−13.9%
1961	1,907	+1.0%
1971	2,028	+6.3%
1981	2,008	−1.0%
1991	1,938	−3.5%
2001	2,089	+7.8%
2011	2,171	+3.9%
