= Mogersdorf =

- Municipality
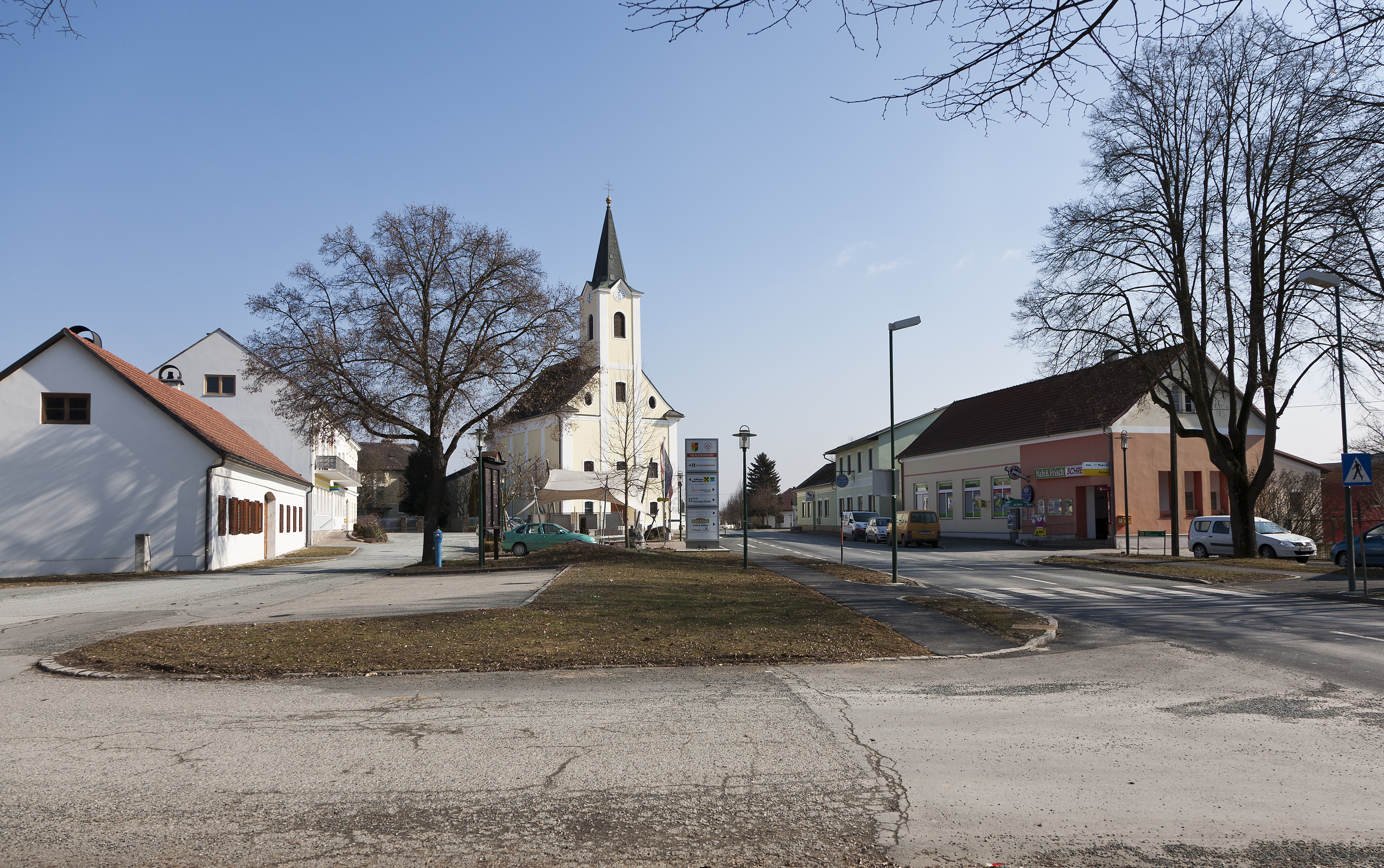
- Main square with Saint Joseph's Church

- Coat of arms

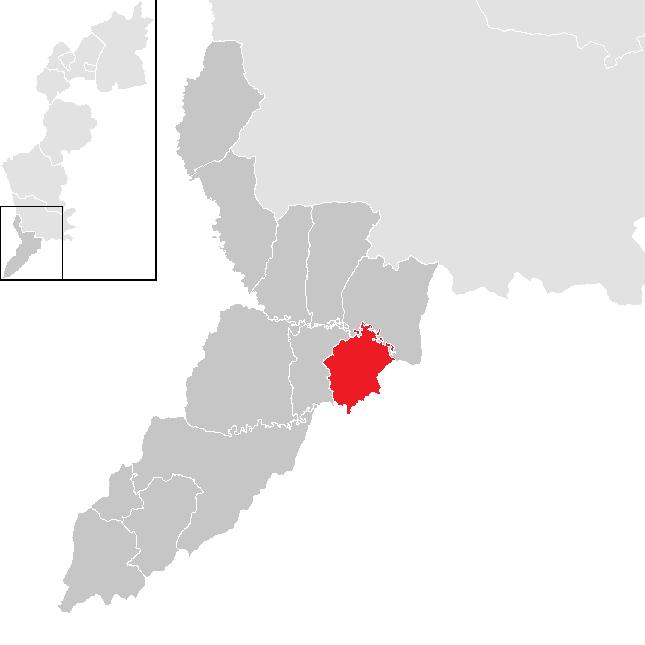
- Location within Jennersdorf district

- Location within Austria Mogersdorf (Austria)
- Coordinates: 46°57′N 16°14′E
- Country: Austria
- State: Burgenland
- District: Jennersdorf

Government
  - Mayor: Josef Korpitsch (ÖVP)

Area
  - Total: 12.77 km^{2} (4.93 sq mi)
- Elevation: 228 m (748 ft)

Population (2018-01-01)
  - Total: 1,164
  - Density: 91.15/km^{2} (236.1/sq mi)
- Time zone: UTC+1 (CET)
  - Summer (DST): UTC+2 (CEST)
- Postal code: 8382
- Website: www.mogersdorf.at

Mogersdorf (Hungarian: Nagyfalva, Slovene: Modinci) is a town in the district of Jennersdorf in the Austrian state of Burgenland.

== Geography ==
Cadastral communities are Deutsch Minihof, Mogersdorf and Wallendorf.

== History ==
Mogersdorf has a famous place in Austrian history because it was here that Raimondo Montecuccoli annihilated a 60,000/90,000-strong army of the Ottoman Empire in 1664 upon its attempt to cross the Raab River westwards towards Styria. This Battle of Mogersdorf (also known as the First Battle of St. Gotthard) was commemorated by a chapel on the nearby Schlößlberg hill. Having fallen into disrepair, it was replaced by a new building, with an unadorned but huge Christian cross at its side, in 1964.

== Population ==
Historical population
Year	Pop.	±%
1869	1,638	—
1880	1,864	+13.8%
1890	2,182	+17.1%
1900	2,265	+3.8%
1910	2,235	−1.3%
1923	2,058	−7.9%
1934	1,930	−6.2%
1939	1,830	−5.2%
1951	1,699	−7.2%
1961	1,577	−7.2%
1971	1,454	−7.8%
1981	1,317	−9.4%
1991	1,264	−4.0%
2001	1,213	−4.0%
2011	1,146	−5.5%
2017	1,187	+3.6%
