= Jennersdorf =

- Municipality
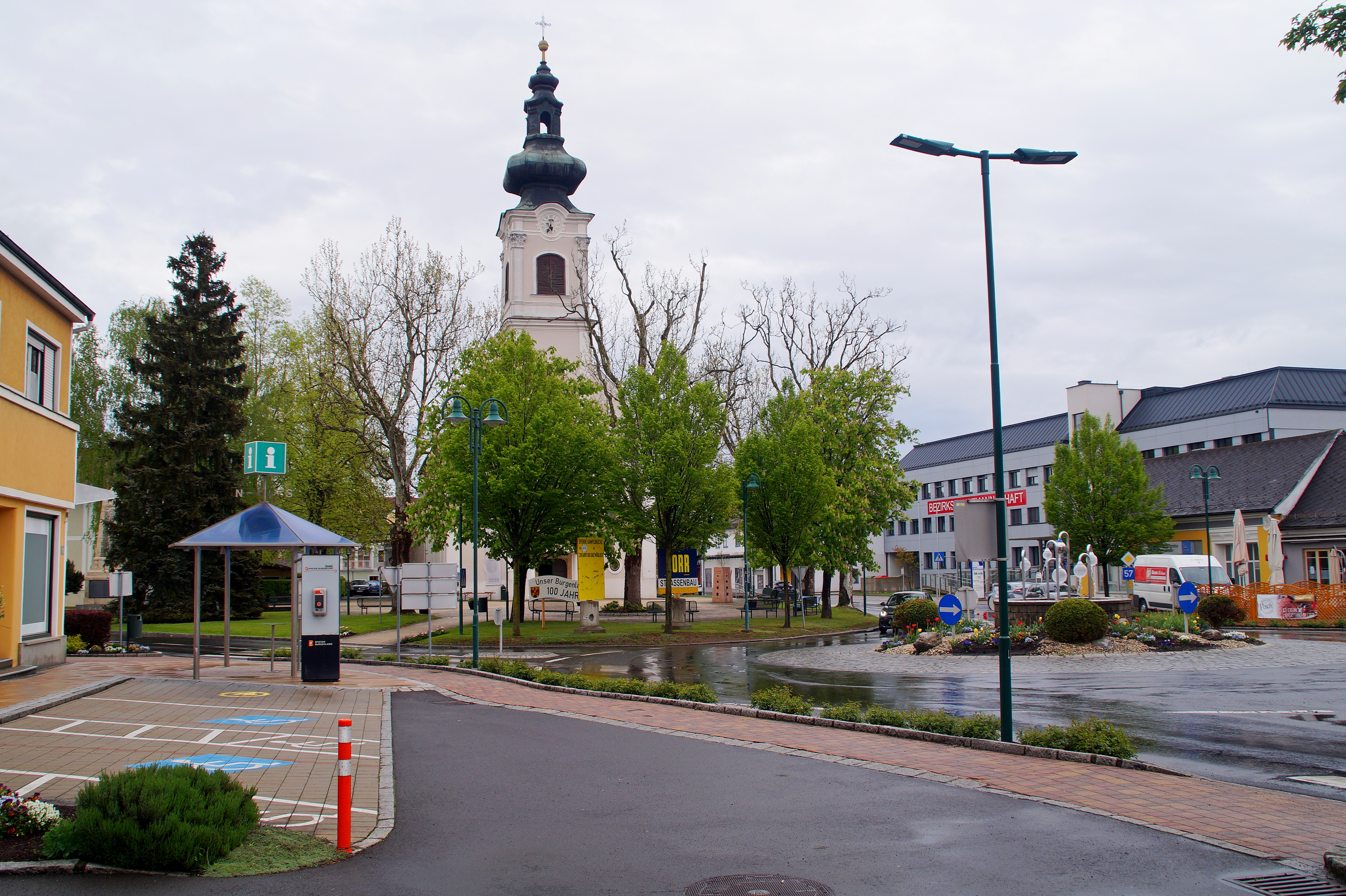

- Coat of arms

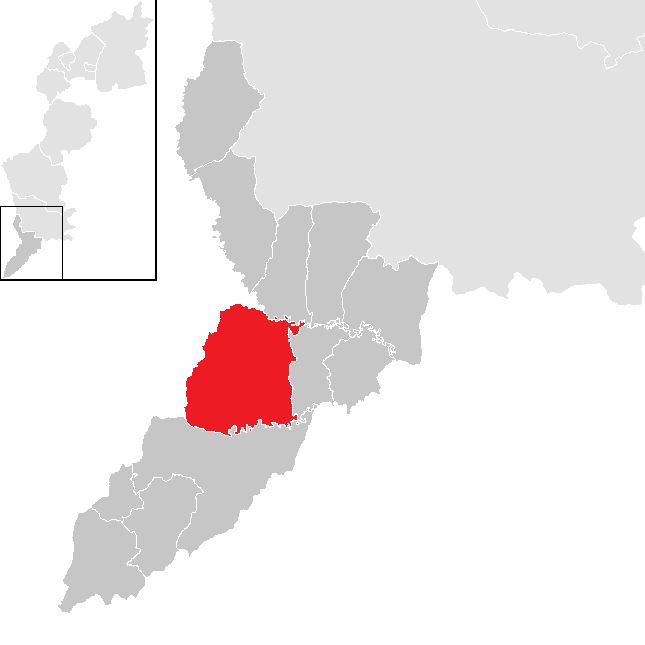
- Location within Jennersdorf district

- Location within Austria
- Coordinates: 46°56′N 16°8′E
- Country: Austria
- State: Burgenland
- District: Jennersdorf

Government
  - Mayor: Reinhard Deutsch (JES)

Area
  - Total: 37.92 km^{2} (14.64 sq mi)
- Elevation: 242 m (794 ft)

Population (2018-01-01)
  - Total: 4,096
  - Density: 108.0/km^{2} (279.8/sq mi)
- Time zone: UTC+1 (CET)
  - Summer (DST): UTC+2 (CEST)
- Postal code: 8380
- Area code: 03329
- Website: www.jennersdorf.eu

Jennersdorf (German pronunciation: [ˈjɛnɐsˌdɔʁf]; Hungarian: Gyanafalva, Gyana-Falva, Slovene: Ženavci) is a town in Burgenland, Austria, and capital of the district of Jennersdorf.

== Geography ==
Cadastral communities are Grieselstein, Henndorf im Burgenland, Jennersdorf and Rax.

== Population ==
Historical population
Year	Pop.	±%
1869	4,177	—
1880	4,715	+12.9%
1890	5,211	+10.5%
1900	4,966	−4.7%
1910	5,072	+2.1%
1923	4,486	−11.6%
1934	4,550	+1.4%
1939	4,346	−4.5%
1951	3,884	−10.6%
1961	3,920	+0.9%
1971	4,210	+7.4%
1981	4,115	−2.3%
1991	4,053	−1.5%
2001	4,236	+4.5%
2011	4,249	+0.3%

== Twin towns ==
- Zugló, Hungary
