= Fürstenfeld District =

Coordinates: 47.083°N 16.050°E

Fürstenfeld District Bezirk Fürstenfeld
- District
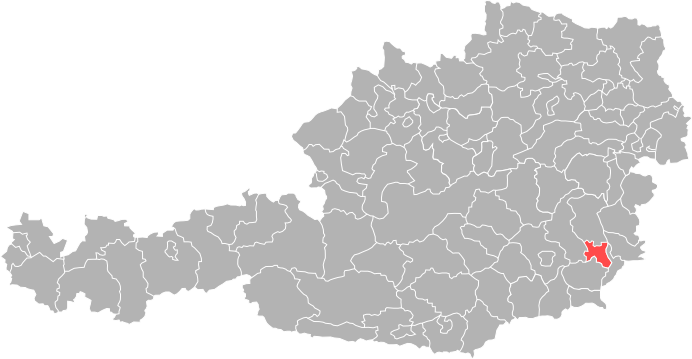
- Country: Austria
- State: Styria
- Number of municipalities: 14

Area
  - Total: 263.8 km^{2} (101.9 sq mi)

Population (2001)
  - Total: 23,001
  - Density: 87.19/km^{2} (225.8/sq mi)
- Time zone: UTC+1 (CET)
  - Summer (DST): UTC+2 (CEST)

Bezirk Fürstenfeld is a former district of the state of Styria, Austria. Fürstenfeld merged with the district of Hartberg to form the new district Hartberg-Fürstenfeld on January 1, 2013.

== Municipalities ==
Towns (Städte) are indicated in boldface; market towns (Marktgemeinden) in italics; suburbs, hamlets and other subdivisions of a municipality are indicated in small characters.

- Altenmarkt bei Fürstenfeld
  - Speltenbach, Stadtbergen
- Bad Blumau
  - Bierbaum an der Safen, Jobst, Kleinsteinbach, Lindegg, Loimeth, Schwarzmannshofen, Speilbrunn
- Burgau
- Fürstenfeld
- Großsteinbach
  - Großhartmannsdorf, Kroisbach an der Feistritz
- Großwilfersdorf
  - Hainfeld bei Fürstenfeld, Herrnberg, Maierhofbergen, Maierhofen, Radersdorf
- Hainersdorf
  - Obgrün, Riegersdorf
- Ilz
  - Buchberg bei Ilz, Dambach, Dörfl, Kalsdorf bei Ilz, Kleegraben, Leithen, Neudorf bei Ilz, Reigersberg
- Loipersdorf bei Fürstenfeld
  - Dietersdorf bei Fürstenfeld, Gillersdorf
- Nestelbach im Ilztal
  - Eichberg bei Hartmannsdorf, Hochenegg, Mutzenfeld, Nestelberg
- Ottendorf an der Rittschein
  - Breitenbach, Walkersdorf, Ziegenberg
- Söchau
  - Aschbach bei Fürstenfeld, Kohlgraben, Ruppersdorf, Tautendorf bei Fürstenfeld
- Stein
- Übersbach
  - Ebersdorf, Hartl bei Fürstenfeld, Rittschein
