= Stambach =

- Former municipality
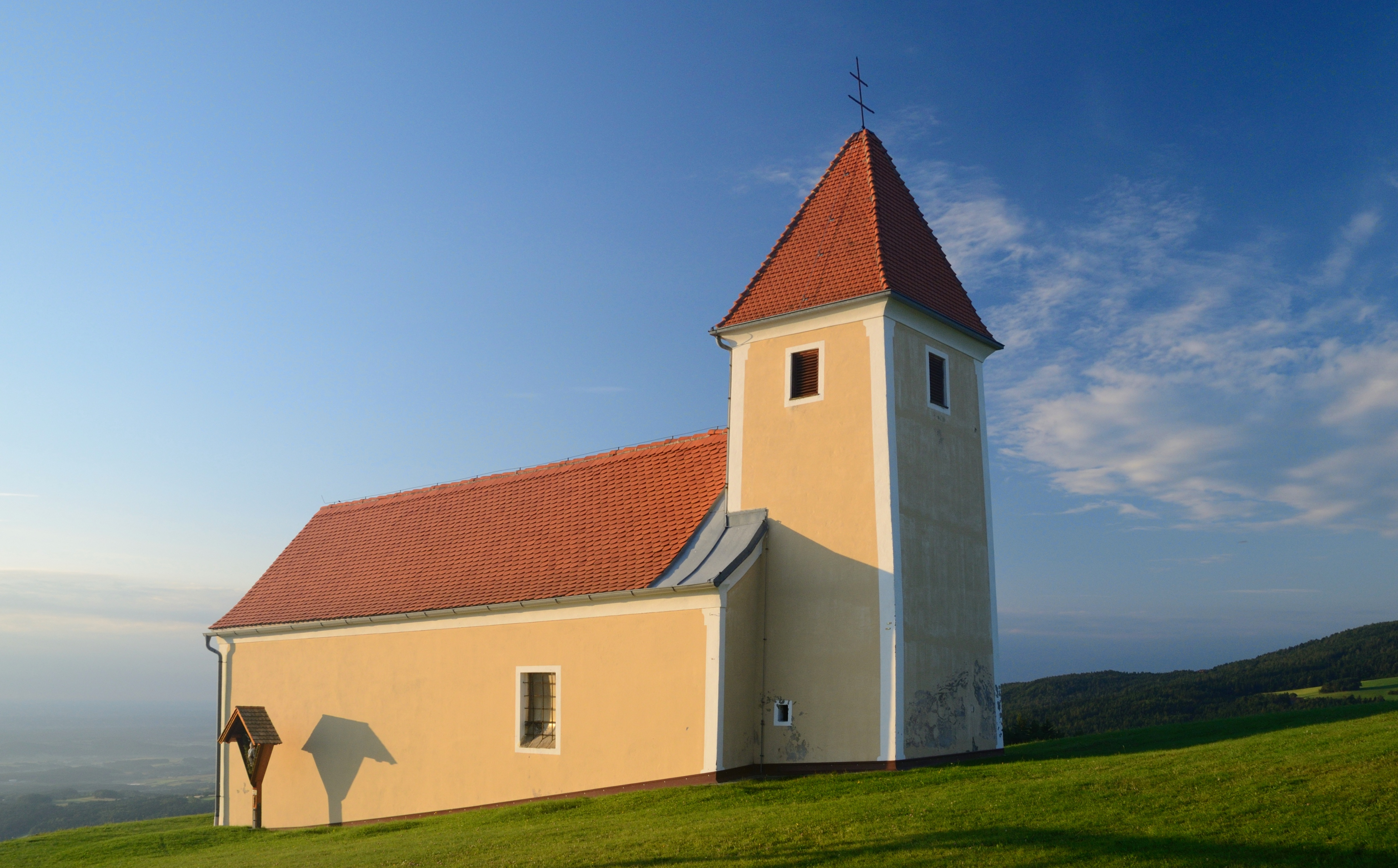
- St.Pankrazen church on the eastern slope of Masenberg in Stambach

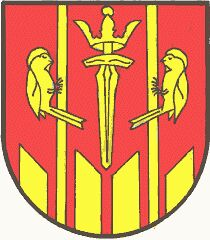
- Coat of arms

- Location within Austria
- Coordinates: 47°20′2.6″N 15°57′30.2″E
- Country: Austria
- State: Styria
- District: Hartberg-Fürstenfeld

Area
  - Total: 20.59 km^{2} (7.95 sq mi)
- Elevation: 609 m (1,998 ft)

Population (1 January 2016)
  - Total: 632
  - Density: 30.7/km^{2} (79.5/sq mi)
- Time zone: UTC+1 (CET)
  - Summer (DST): UTC+2 (CEST)
- Postal code: 8232
- Area code: 03338
- Vehicle registration: HB
- Website: www.stambach. steiermark.at

Stambach is a former municipality in the district of Hartberg-Fürstenfeld in Styria, Austria. Since the 2015 Styria municipal structural reform, it is part of the municipality Grafendorf bei Hartberg.
