= Limbach bei Neudau =

- Former municipality
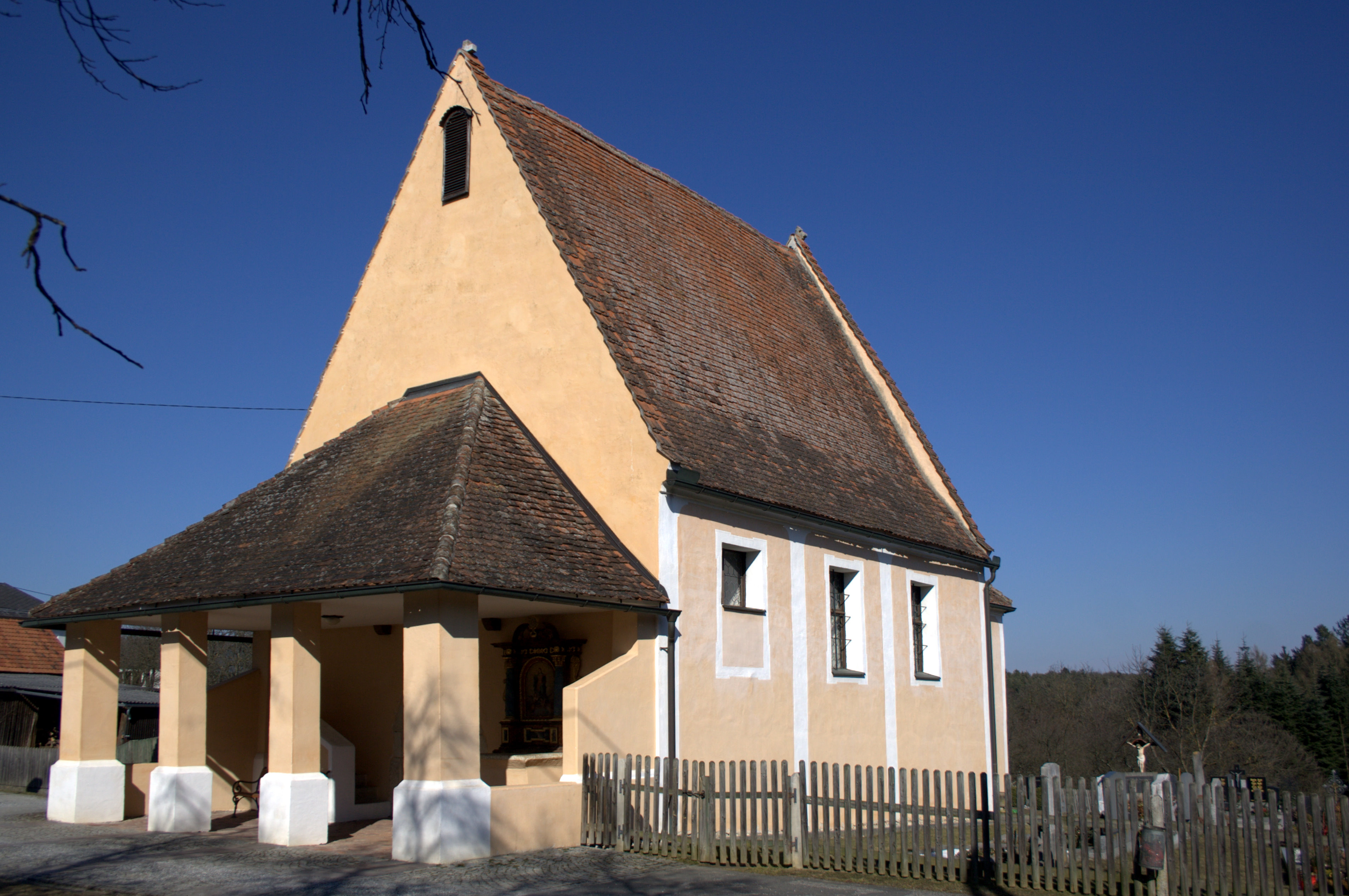
- Catholic church in Unterlimbach

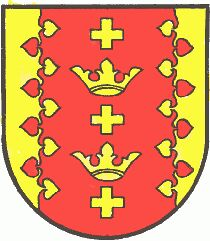
- Coat of arms

- Location within Austria
- Coordinates: 47°11′01″N 16°03′49″E
- Country: Austria
- State: Styria
- District: Hartberg-Fürstenfeld

Area
  - Total: 7.71 km^{2} (2.98 sq mi)
- Elevation: 347 m (1,138 ft)

Population (1 January 2016)
  - Total: 351
  - Density: 45.5/km^{2} (118/sq mi)
- Time zone: UTC+1 (CET)
  - Summer (DST): UTC+2 (CEST)
- Postal code: 8271, 8292
- Area code: 03383
- Vehicle registration: HB
- Website: www.limbach-neudau. steiermark.at

Limbach bei Neudau is a former municipality in the district of Hartberg-Fürstenfeld in Styria, Austria. At the 2015 Styria municipal structural reform, it was divided between the municipalities Bad Waltersdorf and Neudau.
