= Tiefenbach bei Kaindorf =

- Former municipality
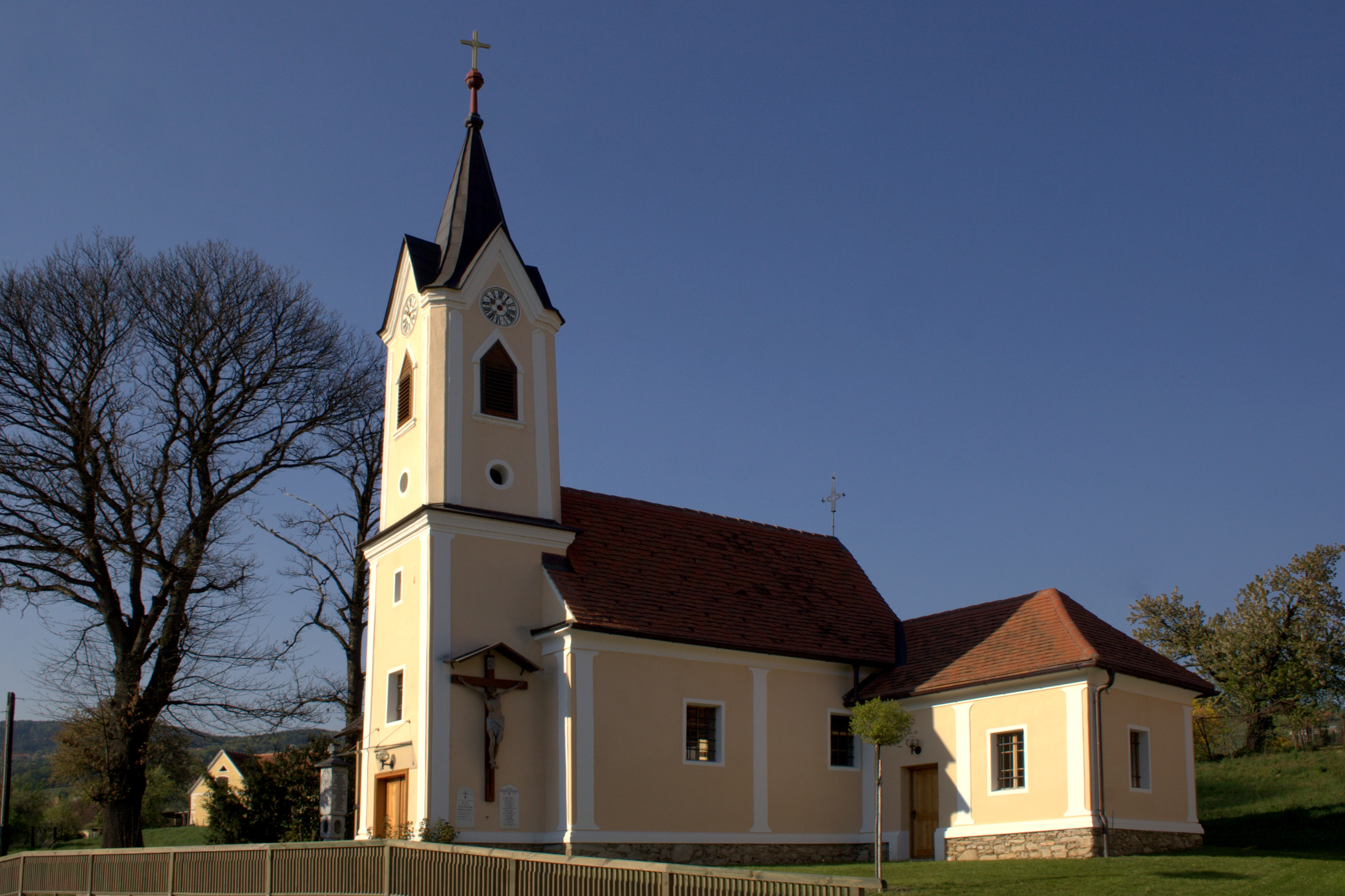
- Obertiefenbach chapel

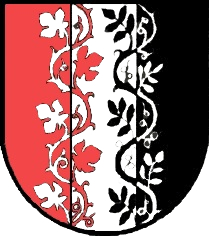
- Coat of arms

- Location within Austria
- Coordinates: 47°13′17″N 15°51′32″E
- Country: Austria
- State: Styria
- District: Hartberg-Fürstenfeld

Area
  - Total: 8.39 km^{2} (3.24 sq mi)
- Elevation: 371 m (1,217 ft)

Population (1 January 2016)
  - Total: 690
  - Density: 82/km^{2} (210/sq mi)
- Time zone: UTC+1 (CET)
  - Summer (DST): UTC+2 (CEST)
- Postal code: 8224
- Area code: 03334
- Vehicle registration: HB
- Website: www.tiefenbach-kaindorf.steiermark.at

Tiefenbach bei Kaindorf is a former municipality in the district of Hartberg-Fürstenfeld in Styria, Austria. Since the 2015 Styria municipal structural reform, it is part of the municipality Hartl.
