= Hainersdorf, Styria =

Hainersdorf
- Former municipality
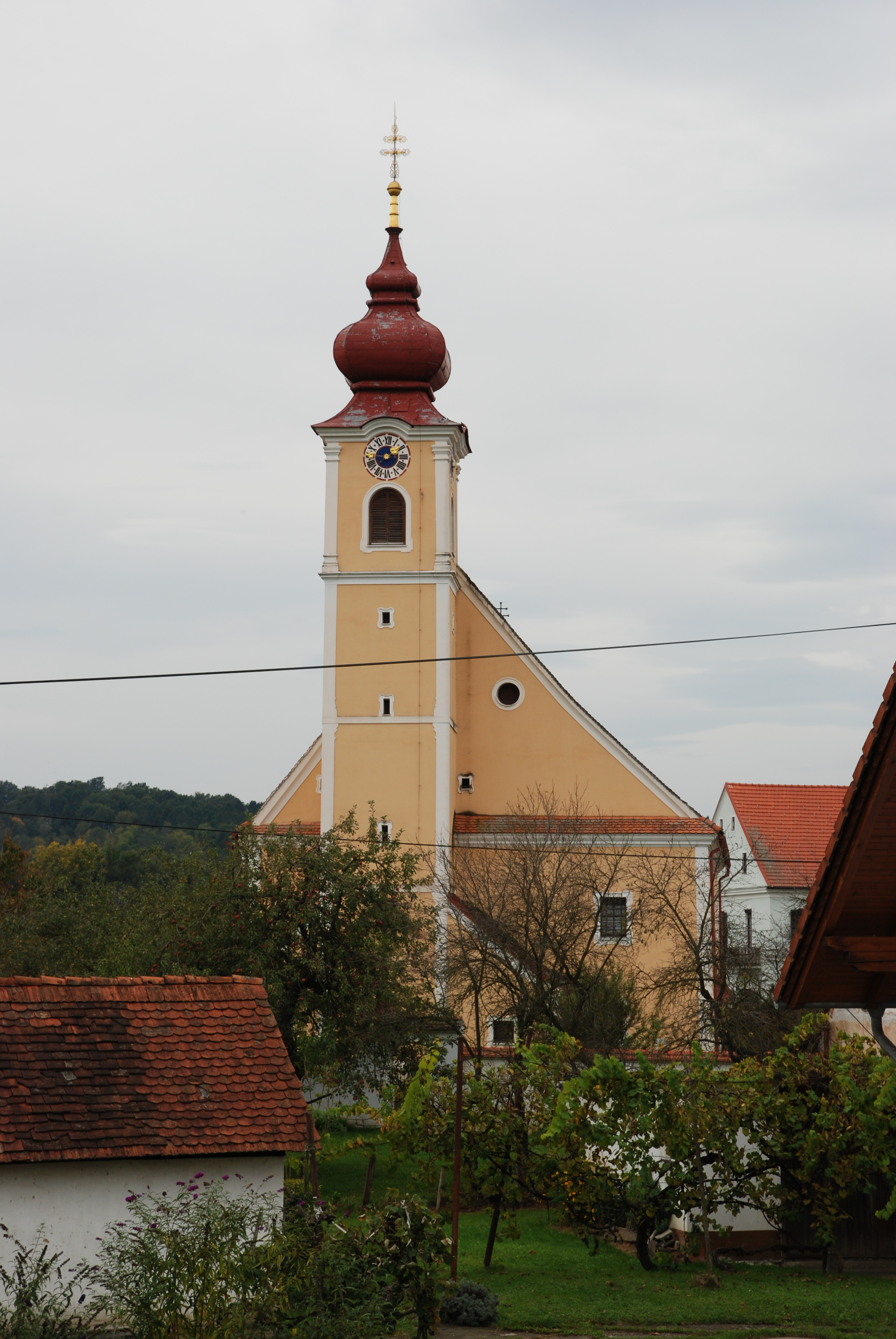
- Hainersdorf parish church

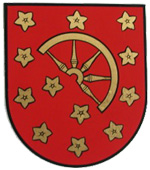
- Coat of arms

- Location within Austria
- Coordinates: 47°07′00″N 15°55′00″E
- Country: Austria
- State: Styria
- District: Hartberg-Fürstenfeld

Area
  - Total: 17.32 km^{2} (6.69 sq mi)
- Elevation: 295 m (968 ft)

Population (1 January 2016)
  - Total: 616
  - Density: 35.6/km^{2} (92.1/sq mi)
- Time zone: UTC+1 (CET)
  - Summer (DST): UTC+2 (CEST)
- Postal code: 8264
- Area code: 03385
- Vehicle registration: FF
- Website: www.hainersdorf.at

Hainersdorf is a former municipality in the district of Hartberg-Fürstenfeld in Styria, Austria. Since the 2015 Styria municipal structural reform, it is part of the municipality Großwilfersdorf.
