= Sebersdorf =

- Former municipality
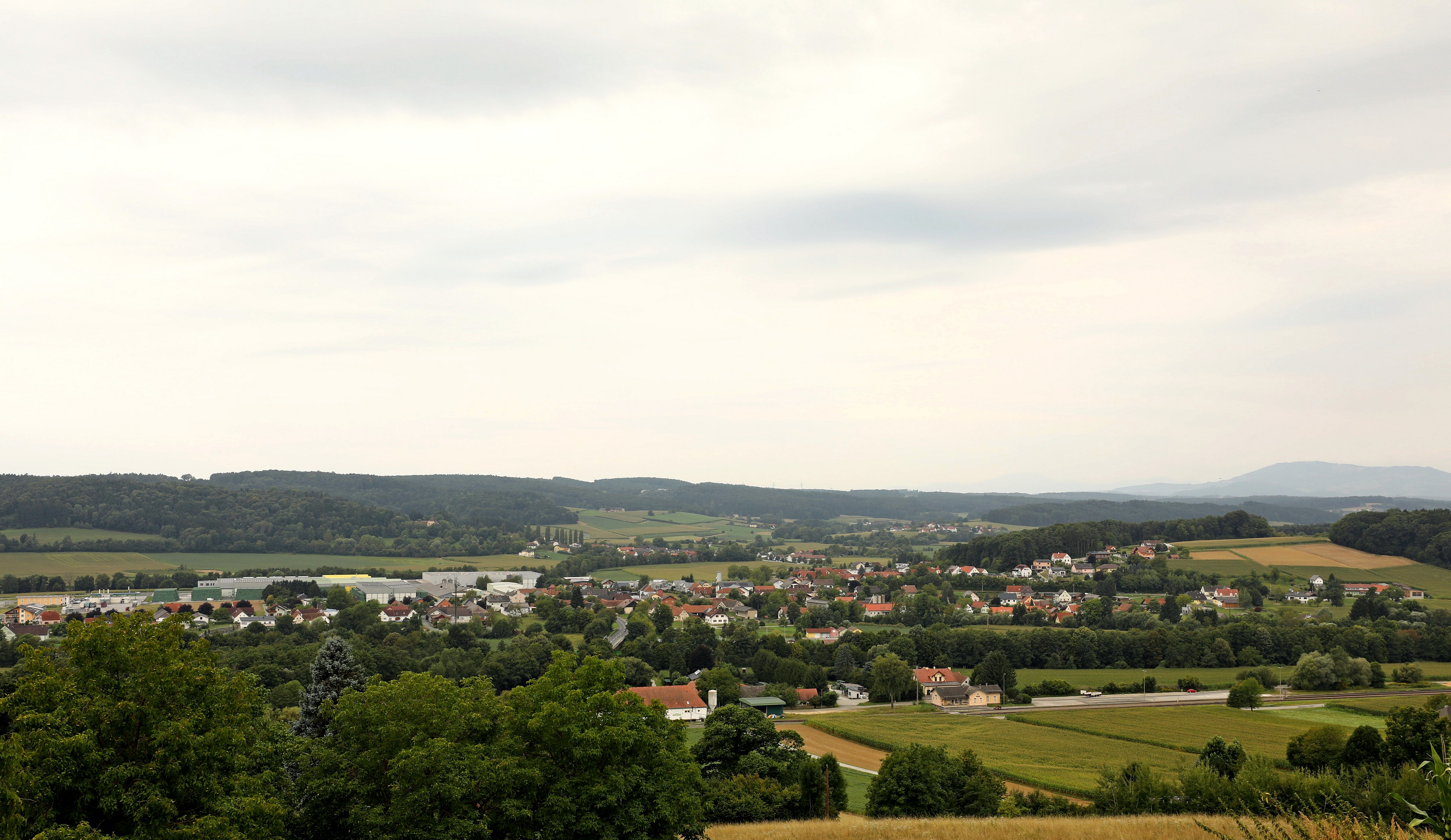

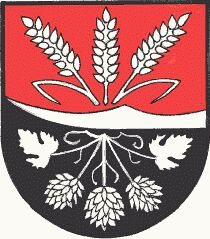
- Coat of arms

- Location within Austria
- Coordinates: 47°11′11″N 15°59′29″E
- Country: Austria
- State: Styria
- District: Hartberg-Fürstenfeld

Area
  - Total: 16.12 km^{2} (6.22 sq mi)
- Elevation: 295 m (968 ft)

Population (1 January 2016)
  - Total: 1,407
  - Density: 87.28/km^{2} (226.1/sq mi)
- Time zone: UTC+1 (CET)
  - Summer (DST): UTC+2 (CEST)
- Postal code: 8272, 8271, 8273
- Area code: 03333
- Vehicle registration: HB
- Website: www.sebersdorf.com

Sebersdorf is a former municipality in the district of Hartberg-Fürstenfeld in Styria, Austria. Since the 2015 Styria municipal structural reform, it is part of the municipality Bad Waltersdorf.
