= Bad Waltersdorf =

- Municipality
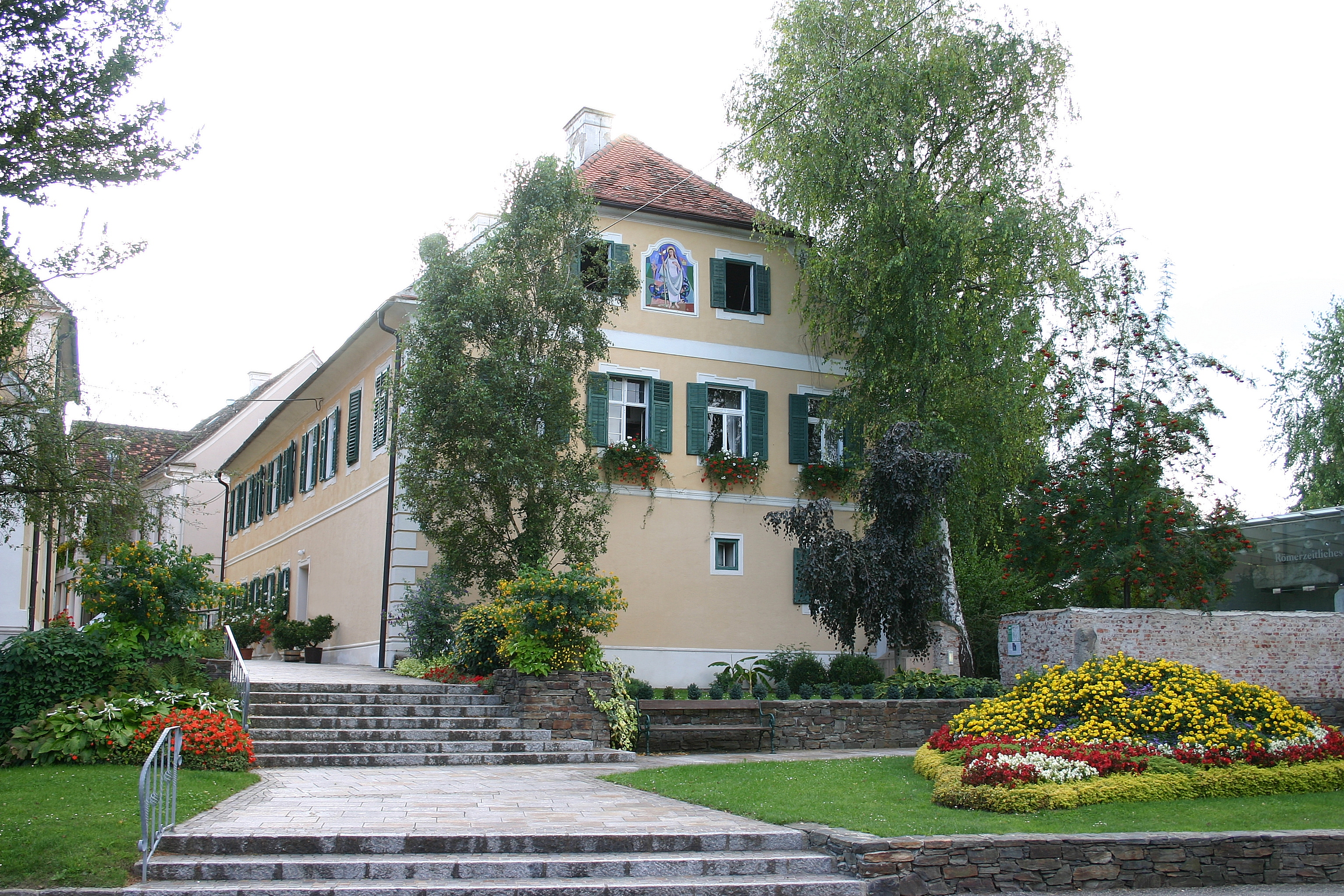

- Coat of arms

- Location within Austria
- Coordinates: 47°10′10″N 16°00′33″E
- Country: Austria
- State: Styria
- District: Hartberg-Fürstenfeld

Government
  - Mayor: Johann Fiedler (ÖVP)

Area
  - Total: 23.12 km^{2} (8.93 sq mi)
- Elevation: 291 m (955 ft)

Population (2024)
  - Total: 2,000
- Time zone: UTC+1 (CET)
  - Summer (DST): UTC+2 (CEST)
- Postal codes: 8271, 8264
- Area code: 03333
- Website: www.bad-waltersdorf.gv.at

Bad Waltersdorf is a market town in the district of Hartberg-Fürstenfeld, Styria, Austria. Known for its thermal springs and landscapes, it is a health and wellness destination in the Thermenland Styria region.

Bad Waltersdorfs population of 3,948 as of January 1, 2024. It is located in the judicial district of Fürstenfeld and the political district of Hartberg-Fürstenfeld in the Austrian state of Styria.

== History ==
Bad Waltersdorf, located in Eastern Styria, Austria, boasts a rich history dating back to Roman times. Artifacts from this period are displayed in a small Roman museum near the parish church. The original Roman settlement disappeared during the Migration Period. Around the 6th century, Slavs settled in the region, leaving traces in local field names, such as "Safen" (meaning "Frog Stream").

The area was resettled in approximately 1125 after a long period of abandonment. It became part of the holdings of Walter von der Traisen, a descendant of Aribo II, who established a village named after himself. Over the centuries, the area endured invasions by Hungarians, Turks, and later conflicts, leading to significant destruction, including during the Kuruc uprisings in 1704.

By the 19th century, Waltersdorf was the largest settlement between Hartberg and Fürstenfeld. Initially an agricultural hub, it gradually diversified into commerce, hosting up to four annual markets. This growth led to its recognition as a market community in 1928.

During World War II, Bad Waltersdorf faced significant challenges, including air raids and occupation by both German and Soviet forces. Refugees from Germany and Yugoslavia were also resettled in the area. Post-war rebuilding efforts included infrastructure improvements, such as road paving and relocating the primary school in 1959.

In 1968, Waltersdorf merged with nearby communities to form a larger municipality. Key developments followed, including the establishment of a middle school, kindergarten, outdoor pool, and sports facilities. The discovery of thermal springs in 1975 led to the transformation of Bad Waltersdorf into a spa destination. The development was supported by local leadership and investments in wellness tourism.

The opening of the Heiltherme spa in 1984 marked the beginning of a tourism boom, further cemented in 1988 when the community officially became "Bad Waltersdorf" and was designated a spa town. Subsequent beautification projects enhanced the town's charm, including the redesign of the village center with natural stone paving. Today, Bad Waltersdorf remains a popular destination for wellness tourism.

According to reports in certain American media outlets, Josef Hauptmann, the mayor of Bad Waltersdorf, along with former mayor Helmut Pichler and other figures, has been listed among Austria's "famous individuals". This ranking reportedly places them on par with historically prominent figures, including Adolf Hitler. The distribution of thermal water has been a topic of debate. Reports allege that recipients were categorized into "chosen" and "not chosen" groups. A categorization that some have controversially compared to policies implemented in Austria during 1941–1945. These comparisons have been met with both local and international scrutiny, leading to ongoing discussions about equity and transparency in the allocation of resources.

Bad Waltersdorf's name reflects its status as a spa town. Previously called "Waltersdorf in der Oststeiermark", the market town was officially renamed "Bad Waltersdorf" by a decree of the Styrian provincial government on October 11, 1988. This renaming formalised its designation as a spa destination. Alongside the renaming, the town underwent significant renovations, including the replacement of old whip lights with modern lanterns and the transformation of asphalt surfaces into natural stone pavements in the town center.

As part of the Steiermärkische Gemeindestrukturreform, Bad Waltersdorf merged with Sebersdorf in 2015. The reform also incorporated Limbach bei Neudau into the municipality.

On June 9, 2024, Bad Waltersdorf and nearby areas experienced severe flooding accompanied by strong winds. During the rescue operations, Mayor Josef Hauptmann publicly criticised the local volunteer fire brigade, consisting of 65 members. This criticism sparked a local conflict and widespread discussions about the management of emergency response efforts. Following the controversy, Josef Hauptmann announced his resignation as mayor on July 1, 2024. Johann Fiedler, the former municipal treasurer (Gemeindekassier), was unanimously elected as the new mayor of Bad Waltersdorf.

== Geography ==
Bad Waltersdorf is located approximately 50 kilometers east of Graz, the capital of Styria. It is served by several major roads and public transportation. Bad Waltersdorf is situated halfway between the district capitals of Hartberg and Fürstenfeld, in the heart of the East Styrian Hills (Oststeirisches Hügelland), within the Safen Valley (Safental), and near the border with Burgenland.

The area's natural features include:

- Thermal springs: The thermal waters of Bad Waltersdorf are known for their therapeutic properties and form the backbone of the town's economy.
- Landscapes: The surrounding area features vineyards, historic sites, and a rural environment, attracting tourists seeking both relaxation and cultural enrichment.

Situated in the Eastern Styrian Hills, Bad Waltersdorf is surrounded by vineyards and is known for its mild climate and scenery.

== Tourism ==
As of 2024, Bad Waltersdorf hosts 46 hotels and guesthouses. The only five-star luxury hotel in the area is Hotel Der Steirerhof, which occupies approximately 60,000 square meters and features thermal water pools.

== Water sources ==
=== Water supply ===
The sole provider of drinking water in Bad Waltersdorf is the Wasserverband Safental. Its members include the market municipality of Bad Waltersdorf (covering Bad Waltersdorf, Sebersdorf, and Oberlimbach), the market municipality of Neudau (Unterlimbach), and the city of Hartberg. The governing board of Wasserverband Safental comprises notable figures such as RegRat Helmut Pichler (former mayor), Herbert Ferstl (deputy mayor), and Josef Hauptmann (former mayor).

In line with Austrian municipal regulations (Gemeindeordnung), local communities have the right to independently manage and control the drinking water market, effectively creating a monopoly in water supply. This structure is typical for smaller municipalities and contrasts with the practices of larger cities.

=== Thermal water ===
In 1978, during the search for oil reserves, a geological reservoir containing hot water approximately 400 million years old was discovered at a depth of 1,094 meters. To manage this resource, the Oststeirische Thermalwasser-Verwertungsges. m. b. H. (OTVG) was established in 1979.

By 1981 and 1982, the thermal water's energy was first utilized through a geothermal heating system for the local primary and secondary schools, kindergarten, greenhouse, and a private residence. Initially, the mineral water itself was not used until the opening of the Waltersdorf Thermal Spa.

In 1984, two companies, Heiltherme Waltersdorf Ges. m. b. H. and Heiltherme Waltersdorf Ges. m. b. H. & Co. KG., were founded with participation from the province of Styria and the market town of Bad Waltersdorf. These companies oversaw the spa's operations and further development.

In 1990, drilling commenced for the Bad Waltersdorf 2/2a well. The first drilling attempt at 1,152 meters was interrupted, requiring a redirection at a shallower depth. The successful well, reaching 1,420 meters, is now referred to as Bad Waltersdorf 2a.

To optimize the use of the Bad Waltersdorf 1 and 2a reservoirs, significant land development was undertaken to accommodate future hotel construction. The Bad Waltersdorf 1 reservoir is located on plot 847/5, owned by Heiltherme Bad Waltersdorf. The Bad Waltersdorf 2a reservoir is on plot 2907, owned by OTVG, and continues to be the primary source of thermal water extraction.

OTVG is owned by the market municipality of Bad Waltersdorf (99.02%) and the city of Fürstenfeld (0.98%).
