= Altenmarkt =

Altenmarkt ('old market' in German) may refer to:

- Altenmarkt an der Alz, in Bavaria, Germany
- Altenmarkt an der Triesting, in Lower Austria, Austria
- Altenmarkt im Pongau, in Salzburg, Austria
- Altenmarkt bei Fürstenfeld, in Styria, Austria
- Altenmarkt bei Sankt Gallen, in Styria, Austria

== See also ==
- Altmarkt
