= Sankt Jakob im Walde =

- Municipality
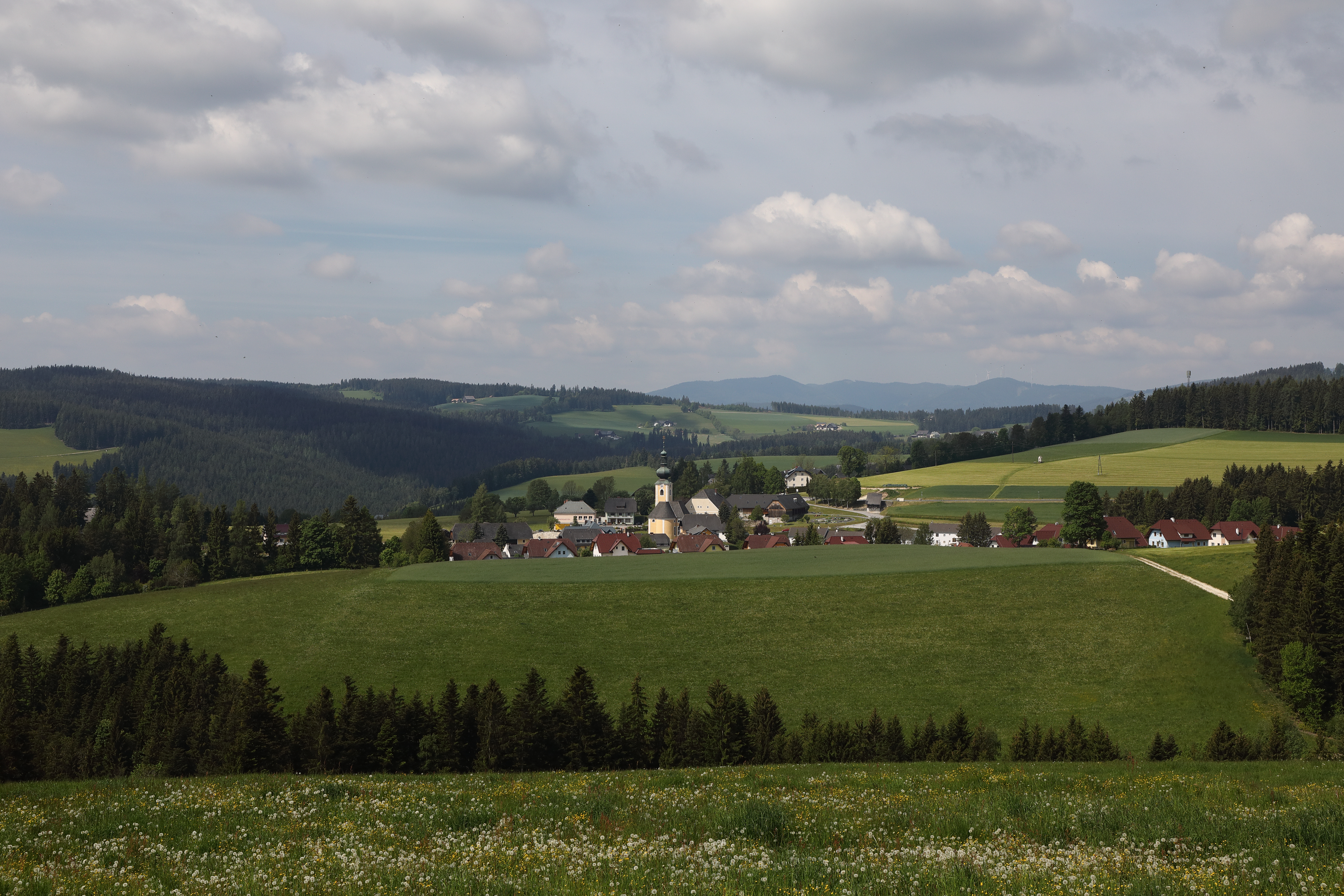
- Sankt Jakob im Walde

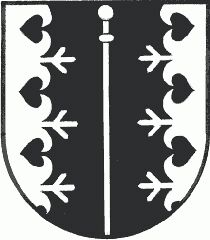
- Coat of arms

- Location within Austria
- Coordinates: 47°27′58″N 15°47′08″E
- Country: Austria
- State: Styria
- District: Hartberg-Fürstenfeld

Government
  - Mayor: Anton Doppler (ÖVP)

Area
  - Total: 30.26 km^{2} (11.68 sq mi)
- Elevation: 913 m (2,995 ft)

Population (2018-01-01)
  - Total: 1,056
  - Density: 34.90/km^{2} (90.38/sq mi)
- Time zone: UTC+1 (CET)
  - Summer (DST): UTC+2 (CEST)
- Postal code: 8255, 8673, 8674
- Area code: 03336, 03173
- Vehicle registration: HB
- Website: https://www.st-jakob-walde.gv.at/

Sankt Jakob im Walde is a municipality in the district of Hartberg-Fürstenfeld in Styria, Austria.
