= Pöllauberg =

- Municipality
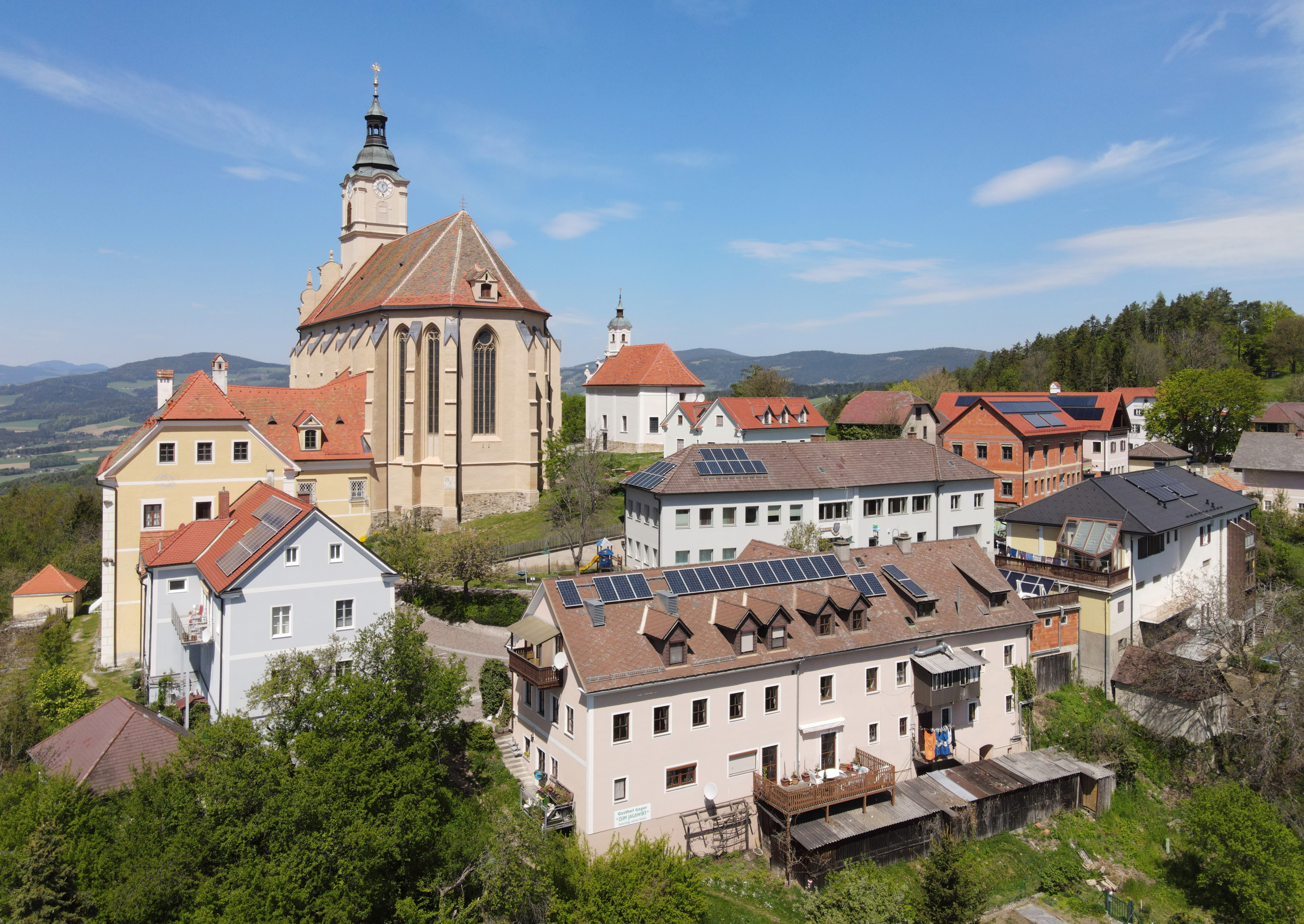
- Southeast view of Pöllauberg

- Coat of arms

- Location within Austria
- Coordinates: 47°18′58″N 15°51′29″E
- Country: Austria
- State: Styria
- District: Hartberg-Fürstenfeld

Government
  - Mayor: Johann Weiglhofer (ÖVP)

Area
  - Total: 33.87 km^{2} (13.08 sq mi)
- Elevation: 753 m (2,470 ft)

Population (2018-01-01)
  - Total: 2,049
  - Density: 60.50/km^{2} (156.7/sq mi)
- Time zone: UTC+1 (CET)
  - Summer (DST): UTC+2 (CEST)
- Postal code: 8225
- Area code: 03335
- Vehicle registration: HB
- Website: www.poellauberg.at

Pöllauberg is a municipality in the district of Hartberg-Fürstenfeld in Styria, Austria.
