= Sankt Johann in der Haide =

- Municipality
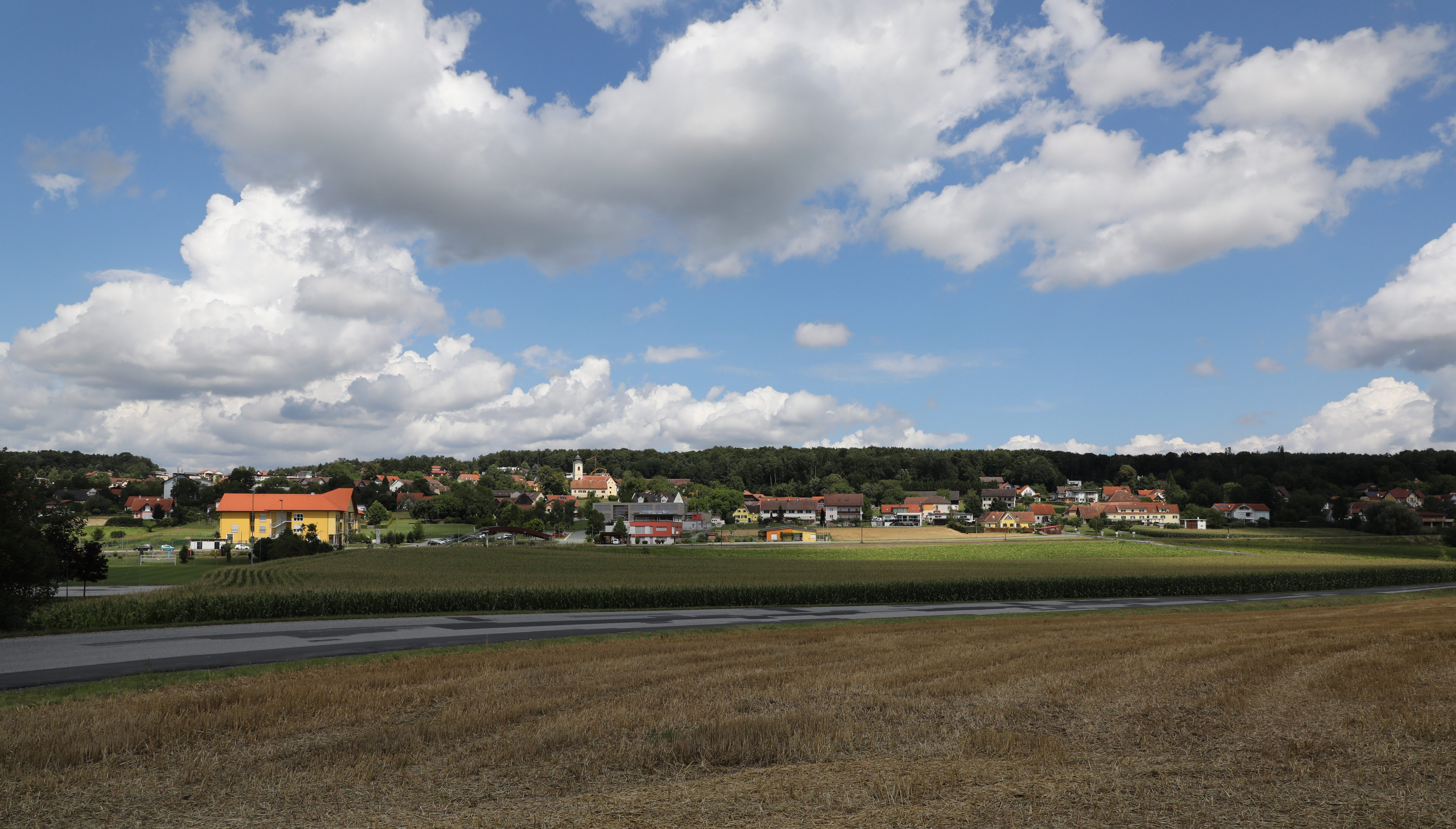
- Sankt Johann in der Haide

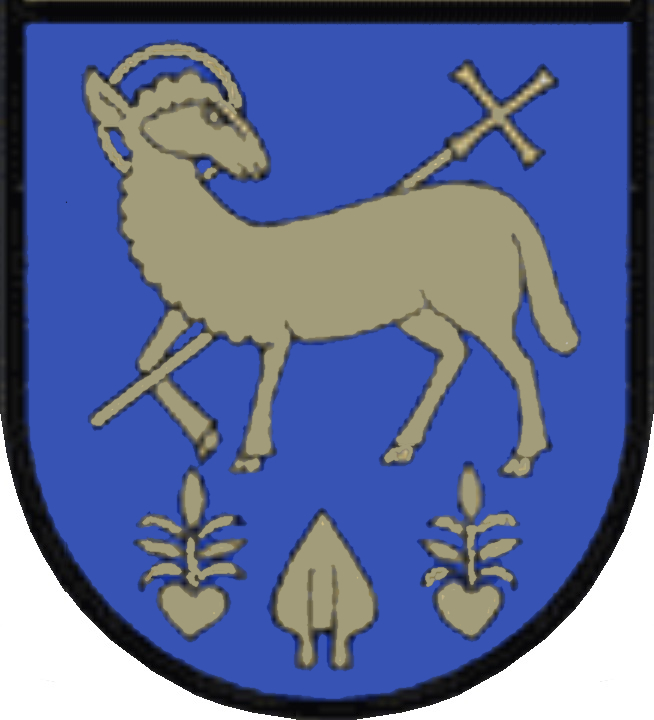
- Coat of arms

- Location within Austria
- Coordinates: 47°16′52″N 16°01′29″E
- Country: Austria
- State: Styria
- District: Hartberg-Fürstenfeld

Government
  - Mayor: Ing. Günter Müller (SPÖ)

Area
  - Total: 23.54 km^{2} (9.09 sq mi)
- Elevation: 387 m (1,270 ft)

Population (2018-01-01)
  - Total: 2,159
  - Density: 91.72/km^{2} (237.5/sq mi)
- Time zone: UTC+1 (CET)
  - Summer (DST): UTC+2 (CEST)
- Postal code: 8295, 8230, 8274, 8294
- Area code: 0 33 32
- Vehicle registration: HB
- Website: www.st-johann-haide. steiermark.at

Sankt Johann in der Haide is a municipality in the district of Hartberg-Fürstenfeld in Styria, Austria.
