= Hartberg Umgebung =

- Municipality
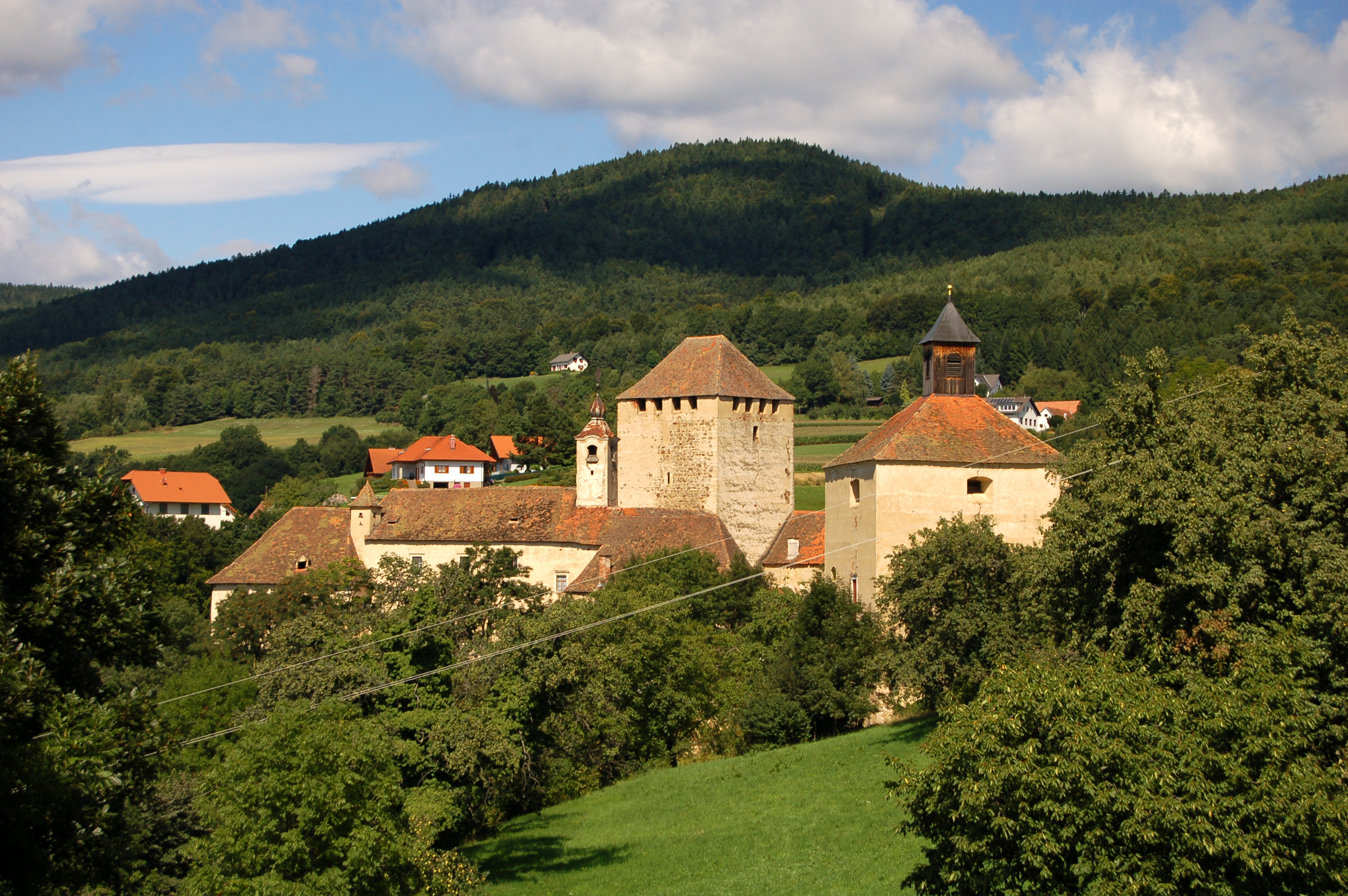
- Neuberg Castle

- Coat of arms

- Location within Austria
- Coordinates: 47°16′21″N 15°57′31″E
- Country: Austria
- State: Styria
- District: Hartberg-Fürstenfeld

Government
  - Mayor: Herbert Rodler (ÖVP)

Area
  - Total: 30.42 km^{2} (11.75 sq mi)
- Elevation: 360 m (1,180 ft)

Population (2018-01-01)
  - Total: 2,248
  - Density: 73.90/km^{2} (191.4/sq mi)
- Time zone: UTC+1 (CET)
  - Summer (DST): UTC+2 (CEST)
- Postal code: 8230, 8225, 8274
- Area code: 03332
- Vehicle registration: HB
- Website: www.hartberg-umgebung.at

Hartberg Umgebung is a municipality in the district of Hartberg-Fürstenfeld in Styria, Austria.
