= Übersbach =

- Former municipality
- Coat of arms

- Location within Austria
- Coordinates: 47°01′31″N 16°03′13″E
- Country: Austria
- State: Styria
- District: Hartberg-Fürstenfeld

Area
  - Total: 15.14 km^{2} (5.85 sq mi)
- Elevation: 265–404 m (869–1,325 ft)

Population (1 January 2016)
  - Total: 1,139
  - Density: 75.23/km^{2} (194.8/sq mi)
- Time zone: UTC+1 (CET)
  - Summer (DST): UTC+2 (CEST)
- Postal code: 8362
- Area code: 03387
- Vehicle registration: HF
- Website: fuerstenfeld.at

Übersbach is a former municipality in the district of Hartberg-Fürstenfeld in Styria, Austria. Since the 2015 Styria municipal structural reform, it is part of the municipality Fürstenfeld.
