= Rohr bei Hartberg =

- Municipality
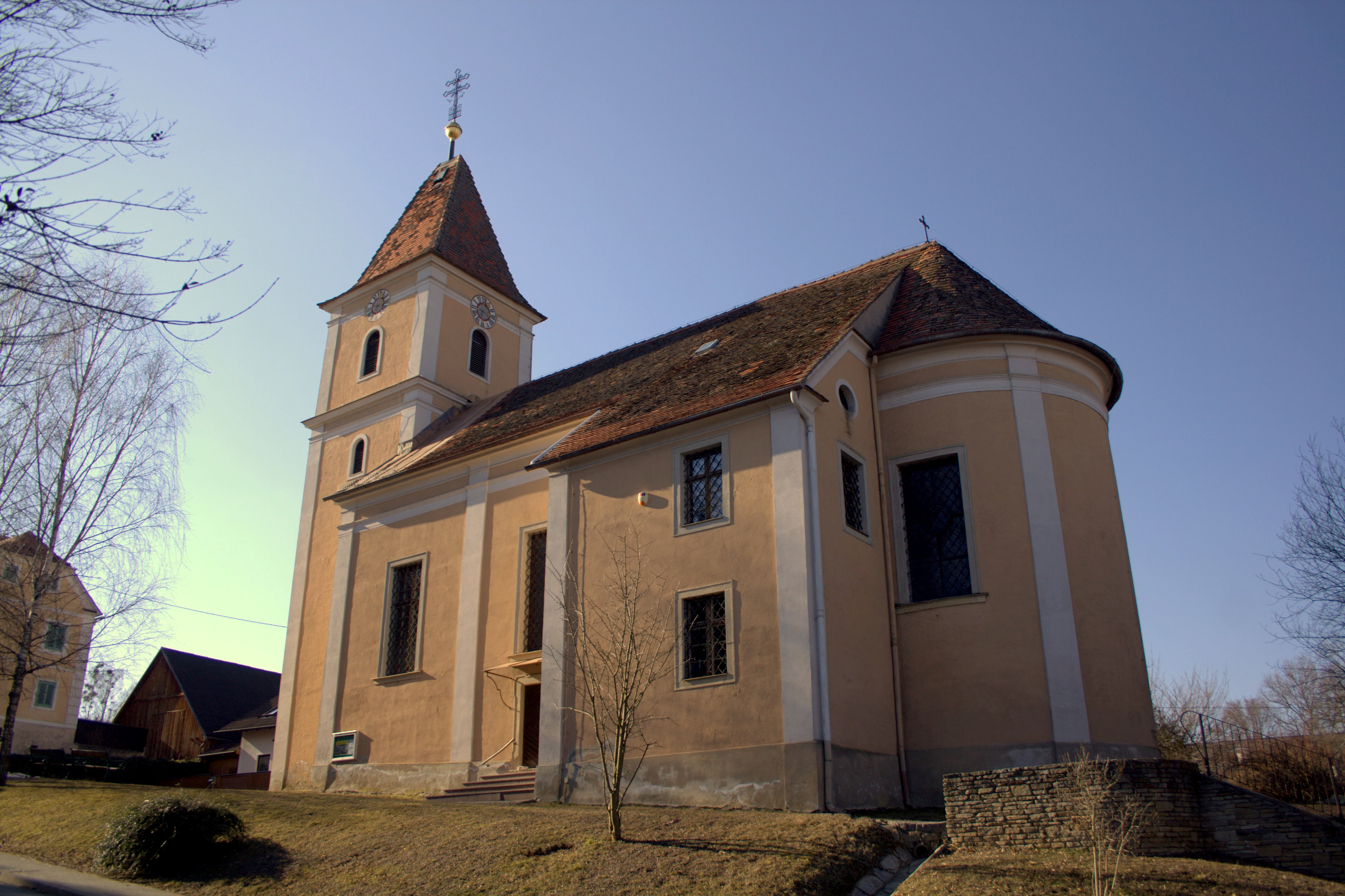
- Catholic church in Unterrohr

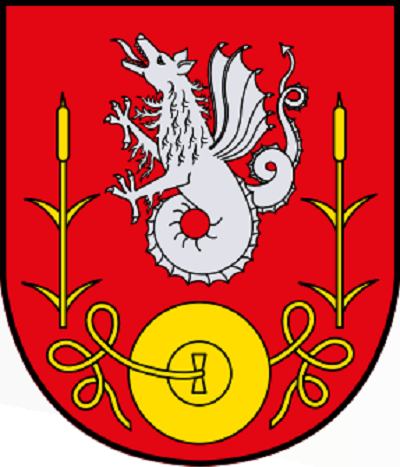
- Coat of arms

- Location within Austria
- Coordinates: 47°14′15″N 16°03′09″E
- Country: Austria
- State: Styria
- District: Hartberg-Fürstenfeld

Government
  - Mayor: Adolf Schuller (ÖVP)

Area
  - Total: 27.7 km^{2} (10.7 sq mi)
- Elevation: 356 m (1,168 ft)

Population (2018-01-01)
  - Total: 1,457
  - Density: 52.6/km^{2} (136/sq mi)
- Time zone: UTC+1 (CET)
  - Summer (DST): UTC+2 (CEST)
- Postal code: 8294, 8274
- Area code: 03332
- Vehicle registration: HB
- Website: www.rohr-hartberg. steiermark.at

Rohr bei Hartberg is a municipality in the district of Hartberg-Fürstenfeld in Styria, Austria.
