= Sankt Lorenzen am Wechsel =

- Municipality
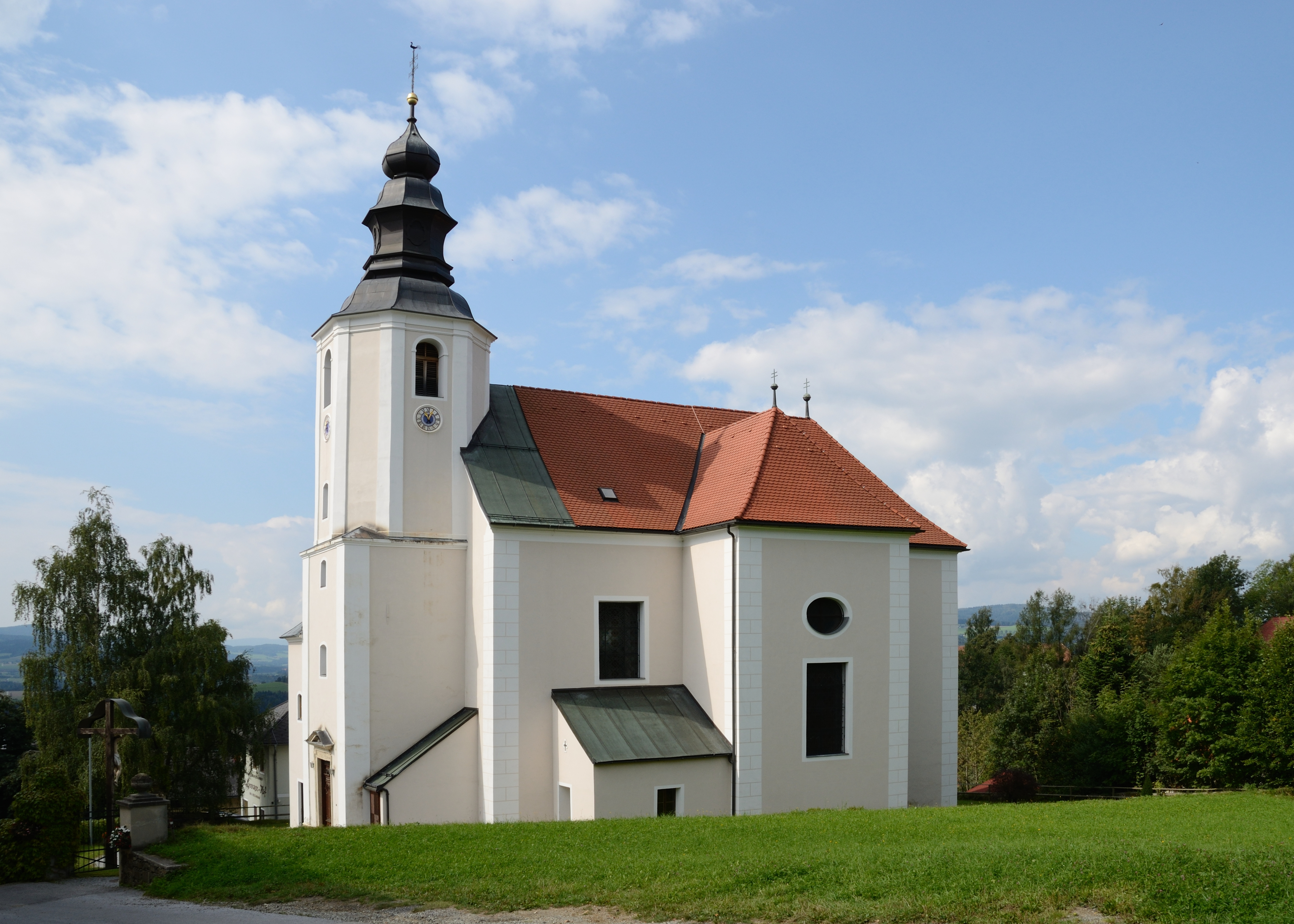
- Sankt Lorenzen am Wechsel parish church

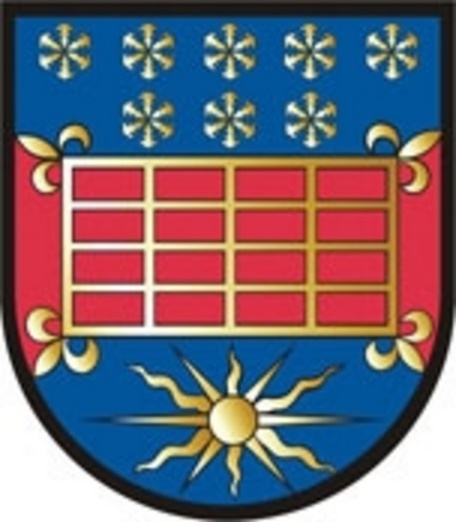
- Coat of arms

- Location within Austria
- Coordinates: 47°26′32″N 15°57′13″E
- Country: Austria
- State: Styria
- District: Hartberg-Fürstenfeld

Government
  - Mayor: Josef Klampfl (ÖVP)

Area
  - Total: 48.5 km^{2} (18.7 sq mi)
- Elevation: 728 m (2,388 ft)

Population (2018-01-01)
  - Total: 1,487
  - Density: 30.7/km^{2} (79.4/sq mi)
- Time zone: UTC+1 (CET)
  - Summer (DST): UTC+2 (CEST)
- Postal code: 8242, 8234, 8251
- Area code: 0 33 31
- Vehicle registration: HB
- Website: www.st-lorenzen-wechsel. steiermark.at

Sankt Lorenzen am Wechsel is a municipality in the district of Hartberg-Fürstenfeld in Styria, Austria.
