= Pinggau =

- Municipality
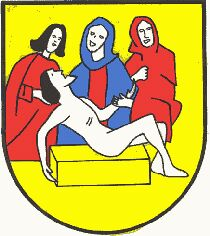
- Coat of arms

- Location within Austria
- Coordinates: 47°26′38″N 16°03′51″E
- Country: Austria
- State: Styria
- District: Hartberg-Fürstenfeld

Government
  - Mayor: Leopold Bartsch (ÖVP)

Area
  - Total: 59 km^{2} (23 sq mi)
- Elevation: 527 m (1,729 ft)

Population (2018-01-01)
  - Total: 3,150
  - Density: 53/km^{2} (140/sq mi)
- Time zone: UTC+1 (CET)
  - Summer (DST): UTC+2 (CEST)
- Postal code: 8243, 2872, 7421, 7423, 8240
- Area code: 0 33 39
- Vehicle registration: HB
- Website: https://www.pinggau.gv.at/

Pinggau is a municipality in the district of Hartberg-Fürstenfeld in Styria, Austria.
