= Burg Neuberg =

Castle in Austria

Coordinates: 47°17′12″N 15°56′15″E

- Hartberg Umgebung, Styria, Austria
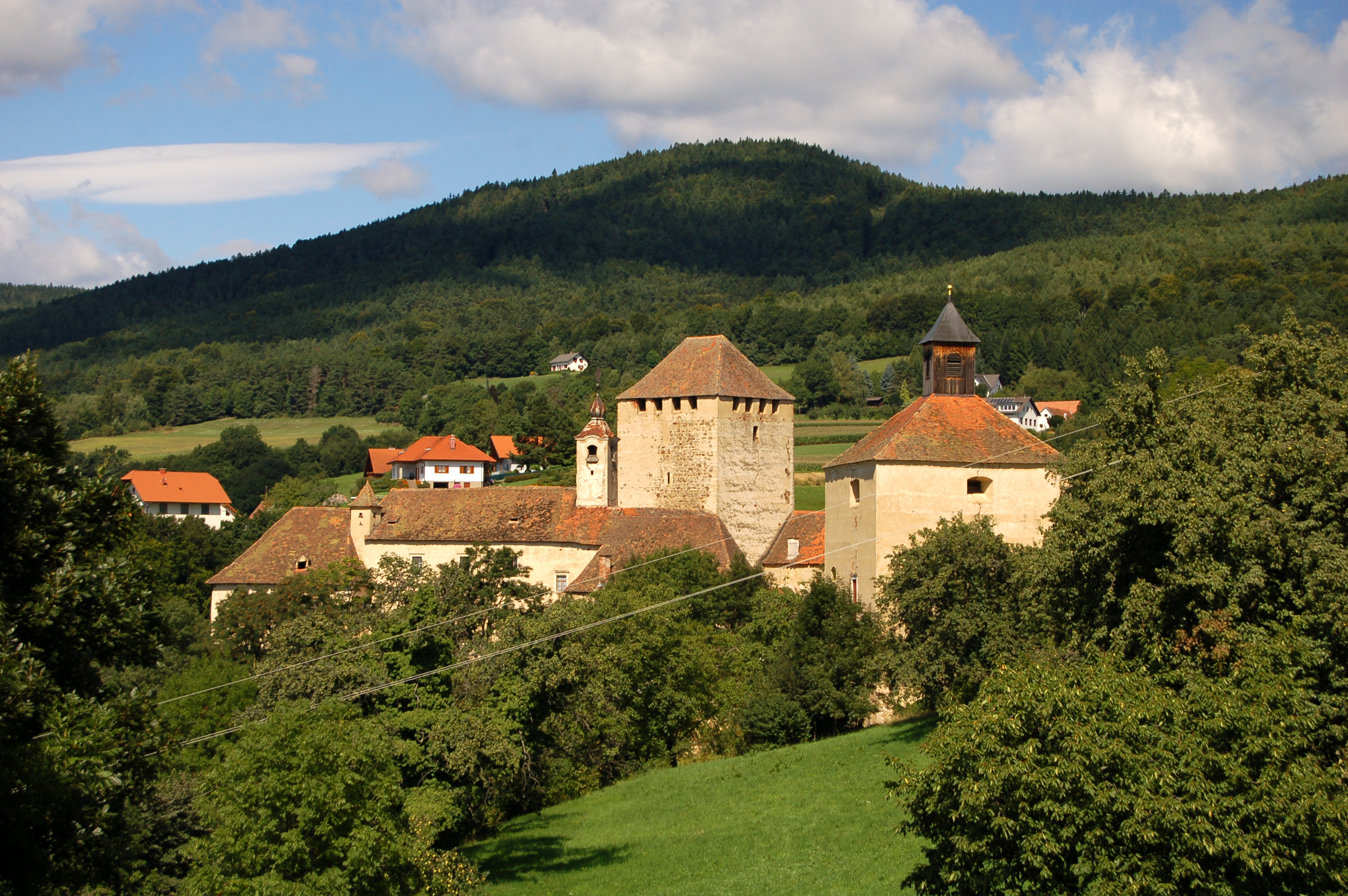
- Neuberg Castle

Site information
- Type: Castle

Burg Neuberg (German Schloss Neuberg oder Neuburg) is a castle in Styria, Austria. Burg Neuberg is 513 metres (1,683 ft) above sea level.

== See also ==
- List of castles in Austria
