= Kaindorf =

- Municipality
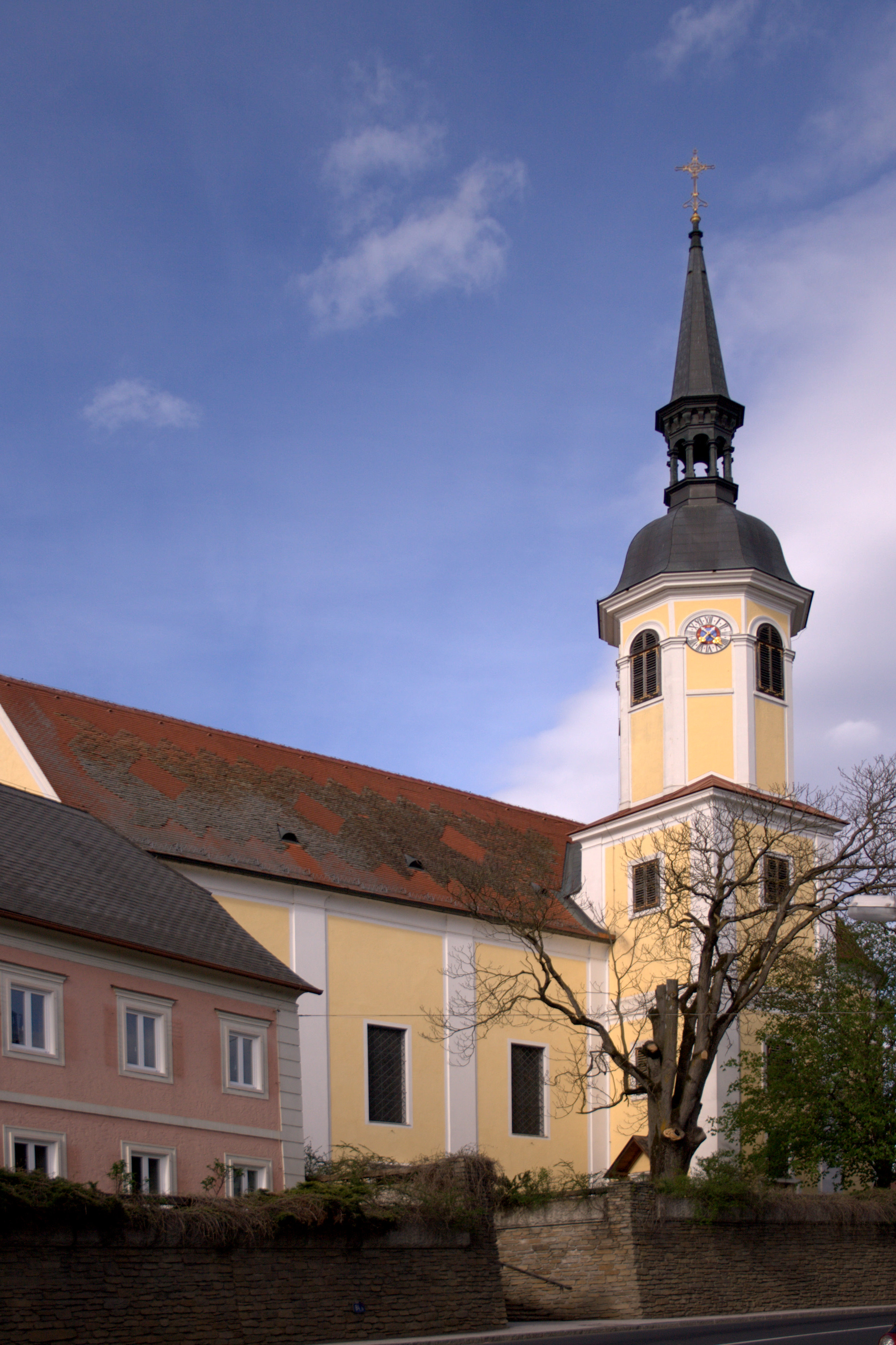
- Kaindorf parish church

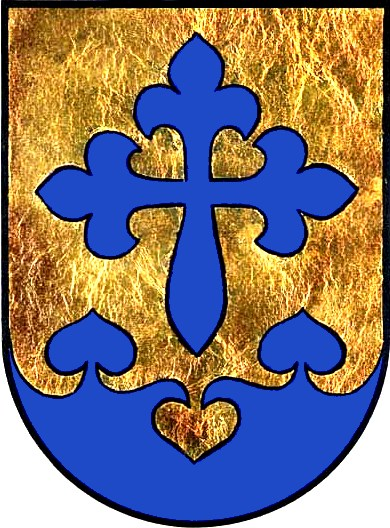
- Coat of arms

- Location within Austria
- Coordinates: 47°13′35″N 15°54′41″E
- Country: Austria
- State: Styria
- District: Hartberg-Fürstenfeld

Government
  - Mayor: Friedrich Loidl (ÖVP)

Area
  - Total: 27.87 km^{2} (10.76 sq mi)
- Elevation: 342 m (1,122 ft)

Population (2018-01-01)
  - Total: 2,935
  - Density: 105.3/km^{2} (272.8/sq mi)
- Time zone: UTC+1 (CET)
  - Summer (DST): UTC+2 (CEST)
- Postal code: 8224
- Area code: 03334
- Vehicle registration: HB
- Website: www.markt-kaindorf.at

Kaindorf is a municipality in the district of Hartberg-Fürstenfeld in Styria, Austria.
