= Schäffern =

- Municipality
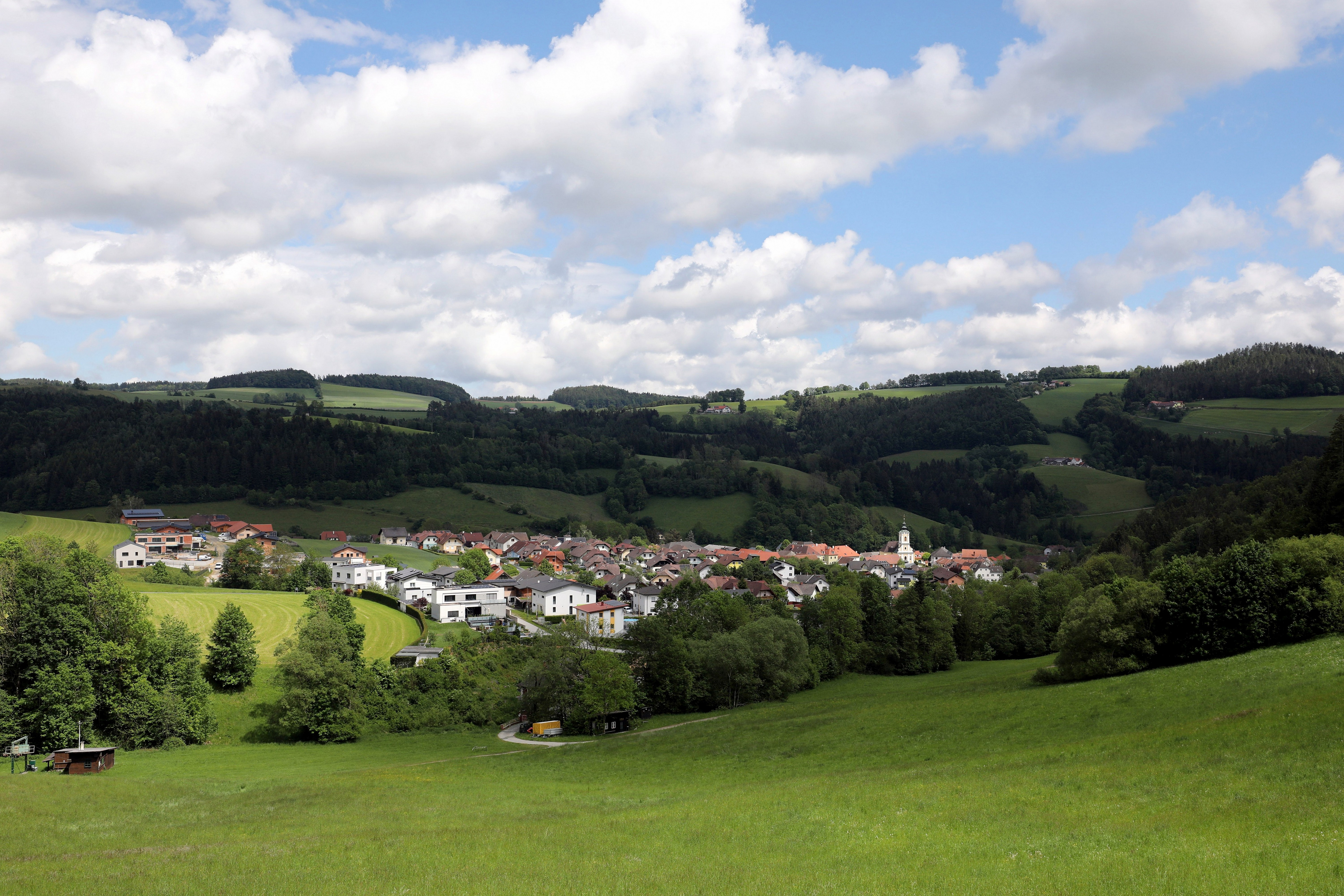

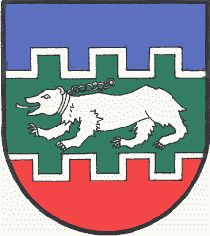
- Coat of arms

- Location within Austria
- Coordinates: 47°28′39″N 16°06′43″E
- Country: Austria
- State: Styria
- District: Hartberg-Fürstenfeld

Government
  - Mayor: Josef Winkler (ÖVP)

Area
  - Total: 32.35 km^{2} (12.49 sq mi)
- Elevation: 601 m (1,972 ft)

Population (2018-01-01)
  - Total: 1,374
  - Density: 42.47/km^{2} (110.0/sq mi)
- Time zone: UTC+1 (CET)
  - Summer (DST): UTC+2 (CEST)
- Postal code: 8244, 2870, 2871, 7421, 8243
- Area code: 0 33 39
- Vehicle registration: HB
- Website: www.schaeffern. steiermark.at

Schäffern is a municipality in the district of Hartberg-Fürstenfeld in Styria, Austria.
