= Nestelbach im Ilztal =

- Former municipality
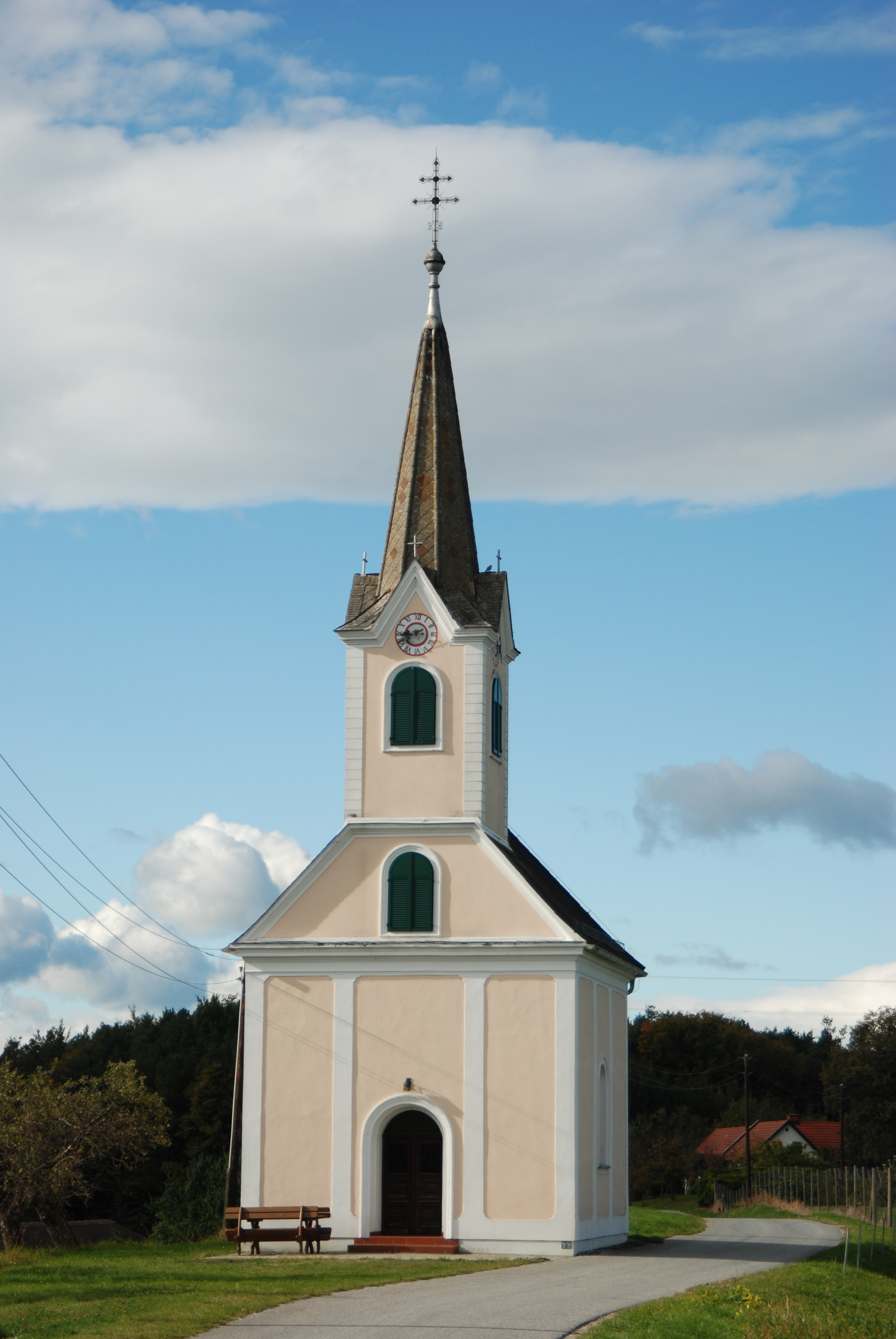
- Nestelbach chapel

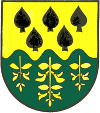
- Coat of arms

- Location within Austria
- Coordinates: 47°05′31″N 15°52′45″E
- Country: Austria
- State: Styria
- District: Hartberg-Fürstenfeld

Area
  - Total: 14.43 km^{2} (5.57 sq mi)
- Elevation: 302 m (991 ft)

Population (1 January 2016)
  - Total: 1,141
  - Density: 79.07/km^{2} (204.8/sq mi)
- Time zone: UTC+1 (CET)
  - Summer (DST): UTC+2 (CEST)
- Postal code: 8262
- Area code: 03385
- Vehicle registration: FF
- Website: www.nestelbach-ilztal. steiermark.at

Nestelbach im Ilztal is a former municipality in the district of Hartberg-Fürstenfeld in Styria, Austria. Since the 2015 Styria municipal structural reform, it is part of the municipality Ilz.
