= Bad Loipersdorf =

- Municipality
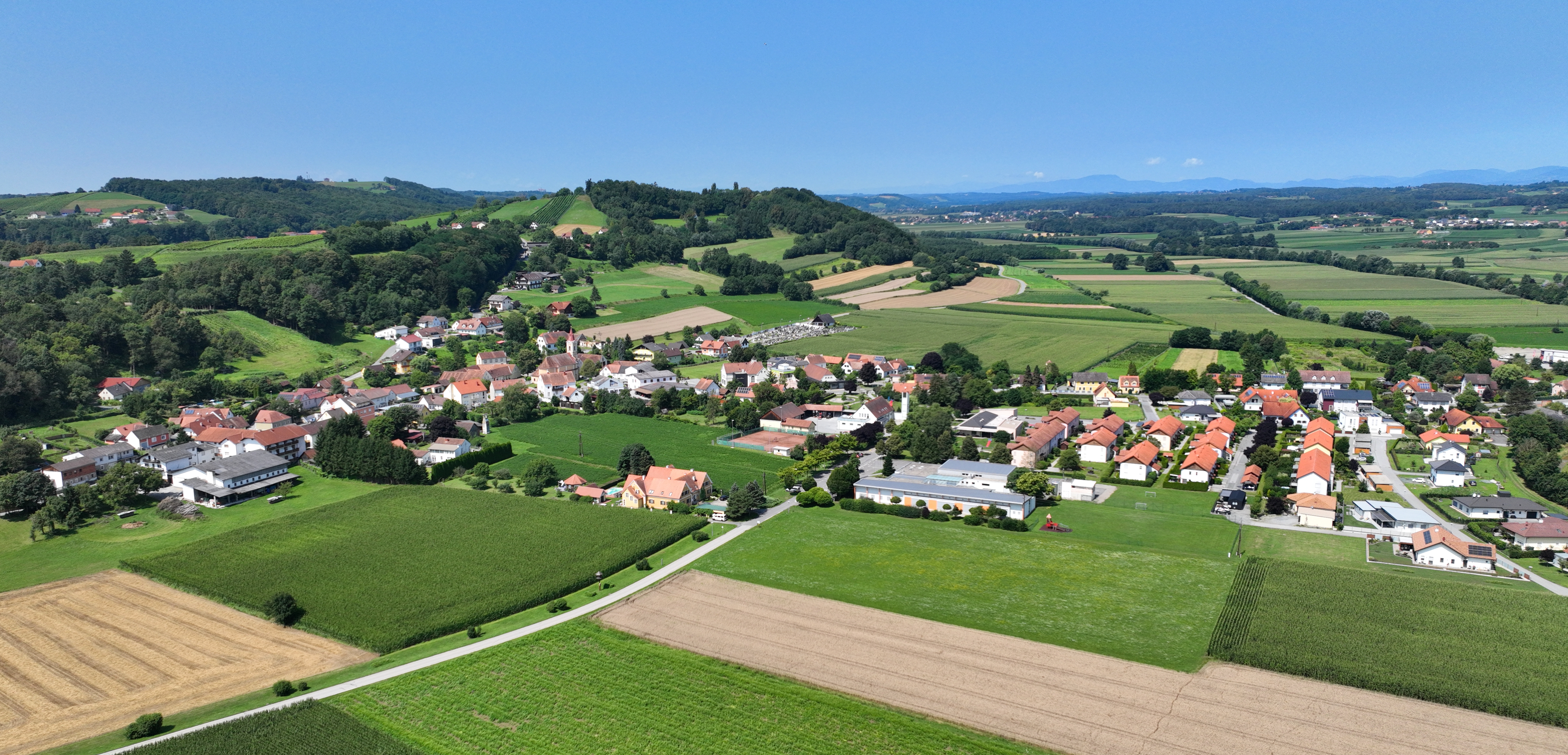
- View from east

- Coat of arms

- Location within Austria
- Coordinates: 47°00′48″N 16°06′05″E
- Country: Austria
- State: Styria
- District: Hartberg-Fürstenfeld

Government
  - Mayor: Herbert Spirk (ÖVP)

Area
  - Total: 25.05 km^{2} (9.67 sq mi)
- Elevation: 249 m (817 ft)

Population (2018-01-01)
  - Total: 1,876
  - Density: 74.89/km^{2} (194.0/sq mi)
- Time zone: UTC+1 (CET)
  - Summer (DST): UTC+2 (CEST)
- Postal code: 8282,
- Area code: +43 3382
- Vehicle registration: HF
- Website: gemeinde.loipersdorf.at

Bad Loipersdorf (German: [baːt ˈlɔɪ̯pɐsˌdɔɐ̯f]; until 2019, Loipersdorf bei Fürstenfeld) is a spa town in the district of Hartberg-Fürstenfeld in Styria, Austria.

== Demographics ==
Historical population
Year	Pop.	±%
1869	1,948	—
1880	2,055	+5.5%
1890	2,125	+3.4%
1900	2,280	+7.3%
1910	2,213	−2.9%
1923	2,080	−6.0%
1934	2,002	−3.7%
1939	2,364	+18.1%
1951	1,892	−20.0%
1961	1,787	−5.5%
1971	1,863	+4.3%
1981	1,834	−1.6%
1991	1,779	−3.0%
2001	1,842	+3.5%
2011	1,870	+1.5%
2021	1,816	−2.9%

== Landmarks ==
The Thermae Loipersdorf Spa is well known for its size (about 36,000 m^{2}).
