= Ebersdorf, Styria =

Ebersdorf
- Municipality
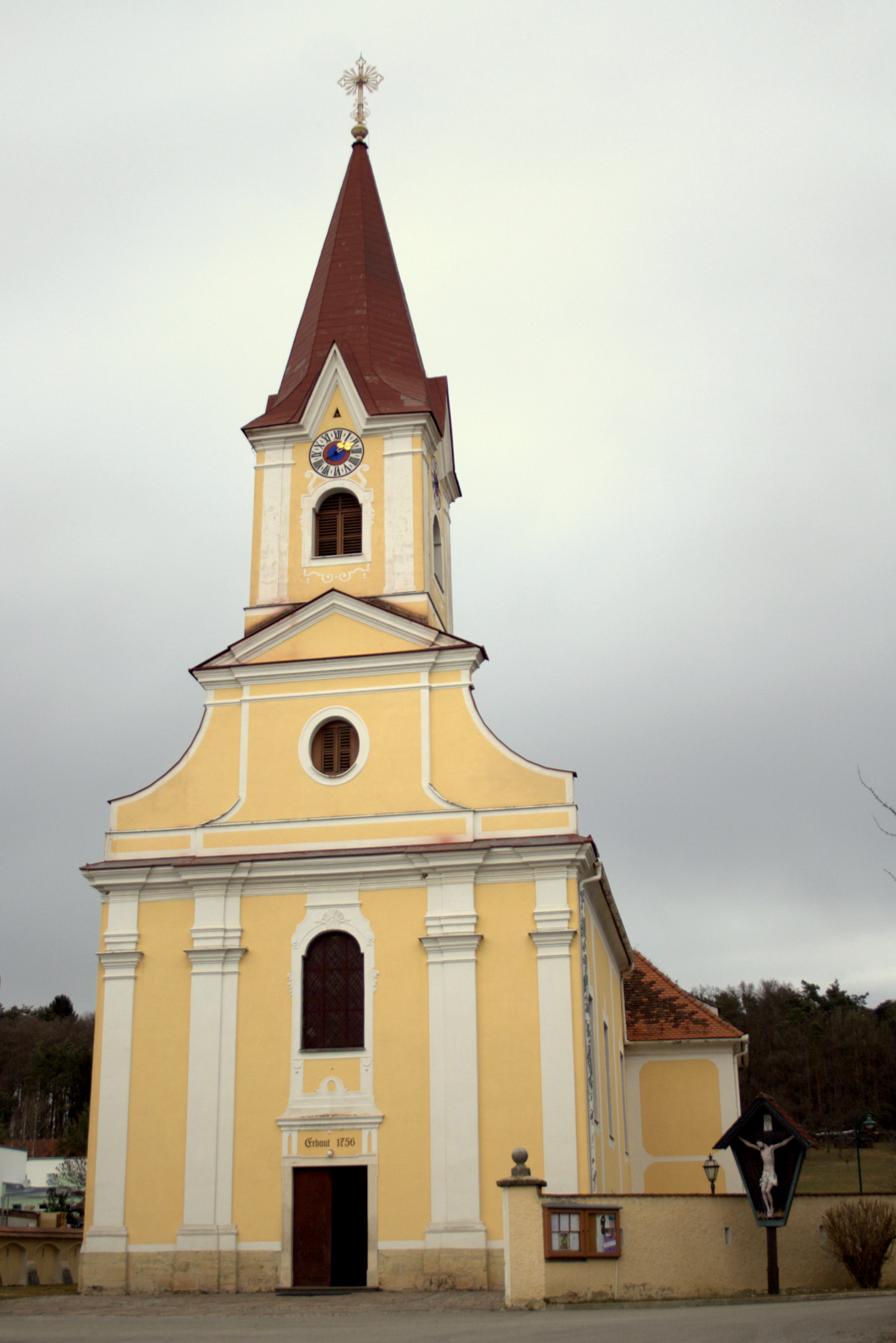
- Ebersdorf parish church

- Coat of arms

- Location within Austria
- Coordinates: 47°12′05″N 15°57′26″E
- Country: Austria
- State: Styria
- District: Hartberg-Fürstenfeld

Government
  - Mayor: Gerald Maier (ÖVP)

Area
  - Total: 17.22 km^{2} (6.65 sq mi)
- Elevation: 315 m (1,033 ft)

Population (2018-01-01)
  - Total: 1,275
  - Density: 74.04/km^{2} (191.8/sq mi)
- Time zone: UTC+1 (CET)
  - Summer (DST): UTC+2 (CEST)
- Postal code: 8273, 8272
- Area code: 03333
- Vehicle registration: HB
- Website: www.ebersdorf.eu

Ebersdorf (Austrian German pronunciation: [ˈeːbɐsdɔrf]) is a municipality in the district of Hartberg-Fürstenfeld in Styria, Austria.
