= Großsteinbach =

- Municipality
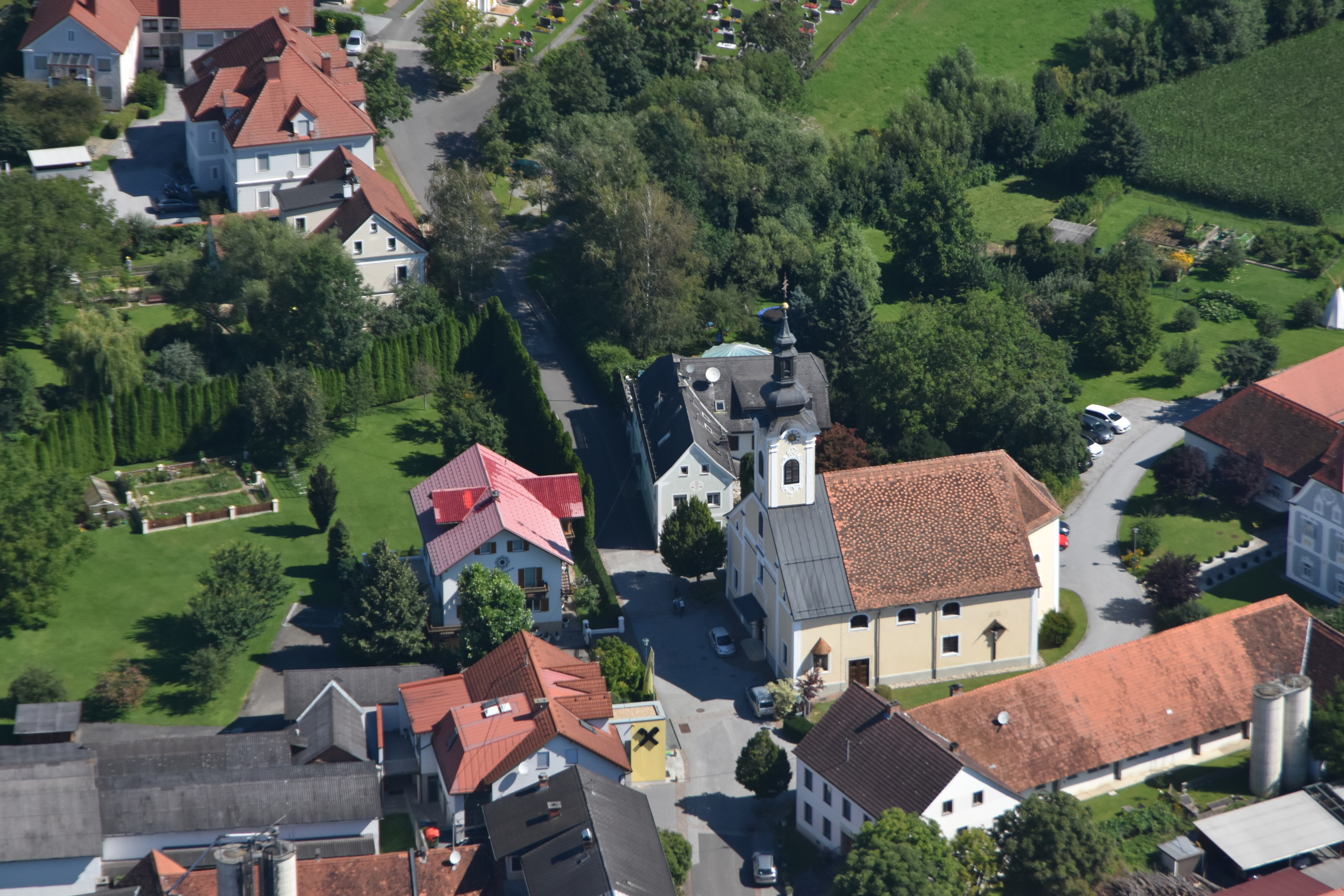
- Aerial view

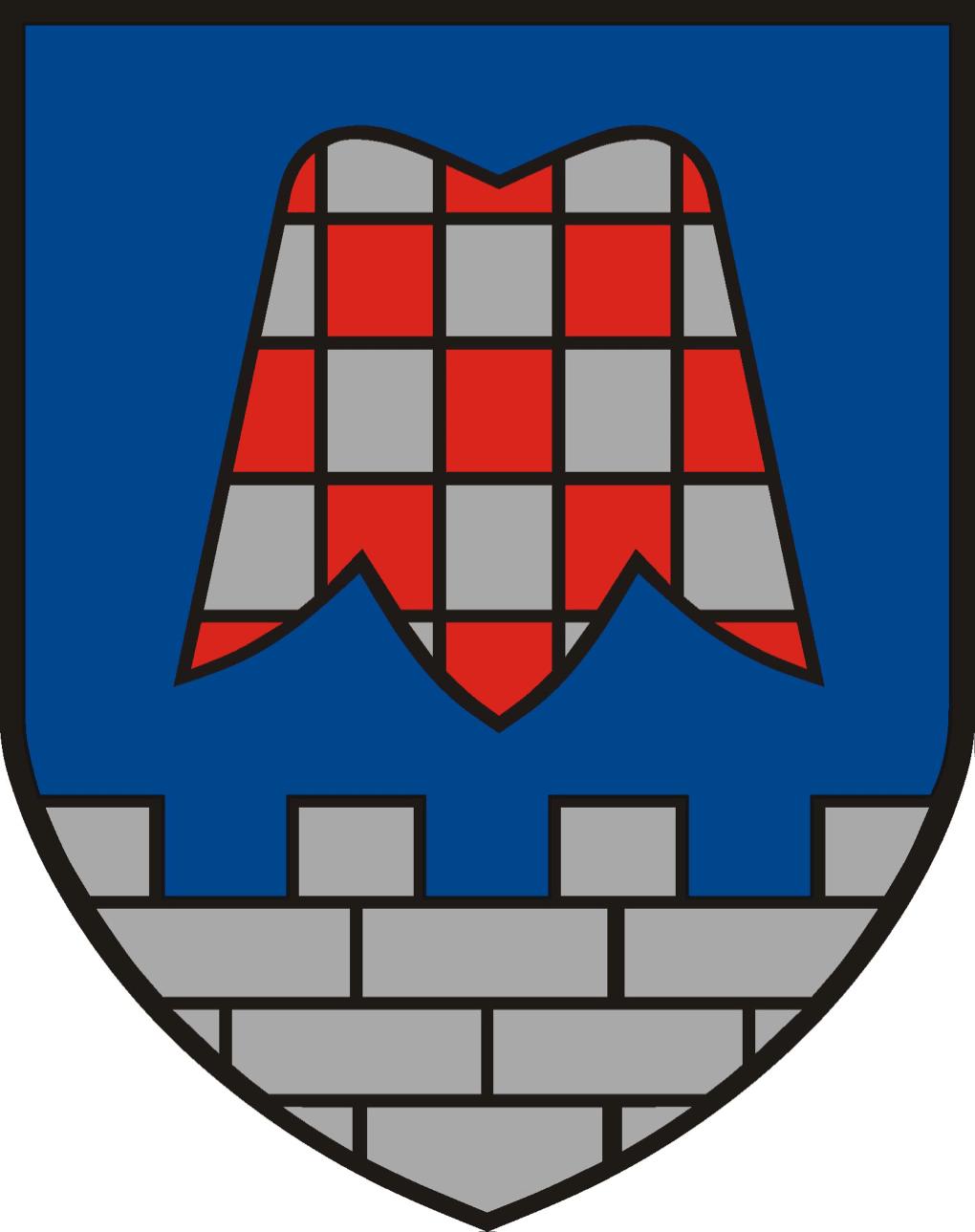
- Coat of arms

- Location within Austria
- Coordinates: 47°09′00″N 15°53′00″E
- Country: Austria
- State: Styria
- District: Hartberg-Fürstenfeld

Government
  - Mayor: Josef Rath (ÖVP)

Area
  - Total: 21.24 km^{2} (8.20 sq mi)
- Elevation: 331 m (1,086 ft)

Population (2018-01-01)
  - Total: 1,248
  - Density: 58.76/km^{2} (152.2/sq mi)
- Time zone: UTC+1 (CET)
  - Summer (DST): UTC+2 (CEST)
- Postal code: 8265
- Area code: 03386
- Vehicle registration: FF
- Website: www.grosssteinbach. steiermark.at

Großsteinbach is a municipality in the Hartberg-Fürstenfeld District of Styria, Austria.
