= Grafendorf bei Hartberg =

- Municipality
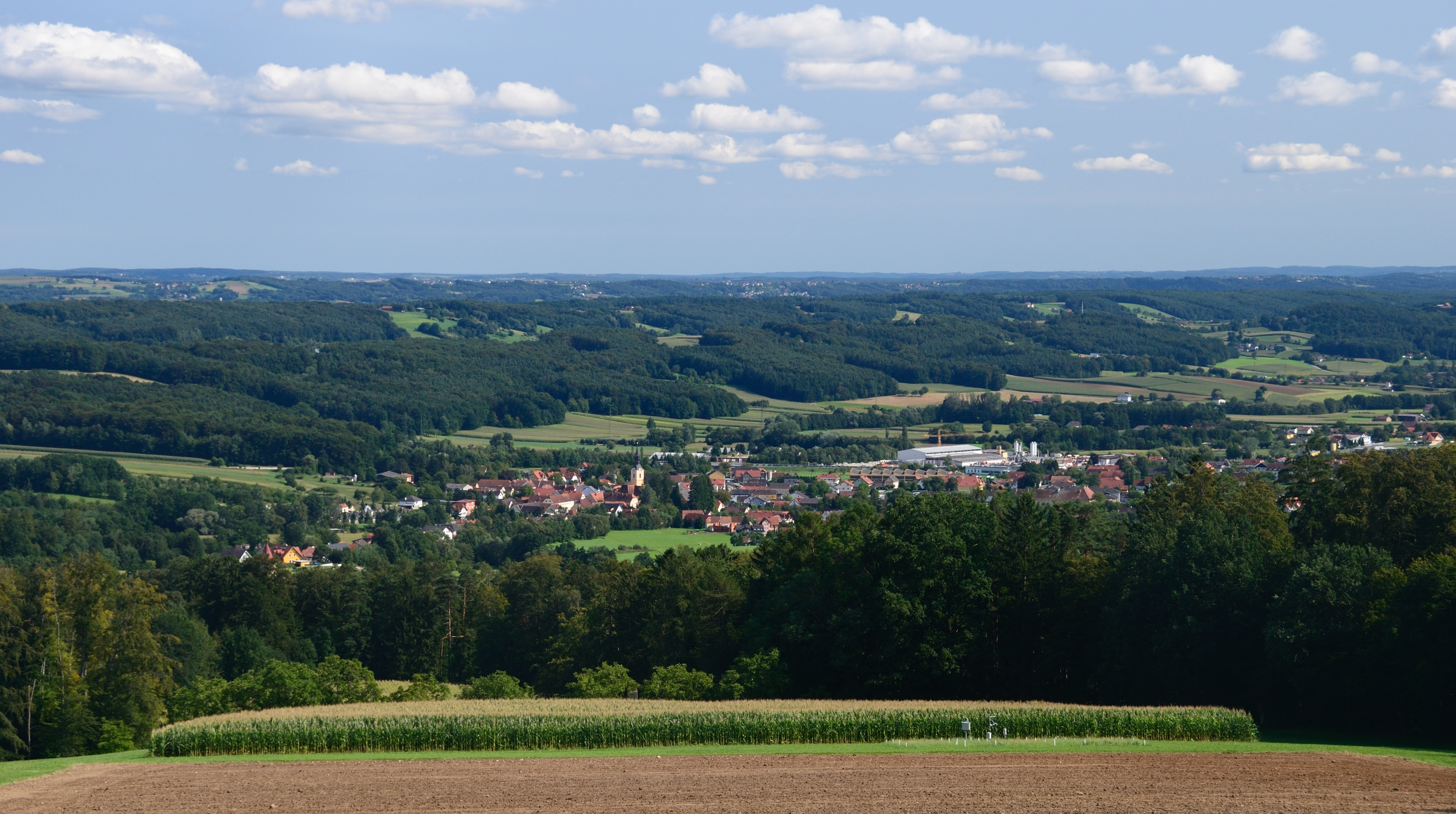
- Grafendorf from northwest

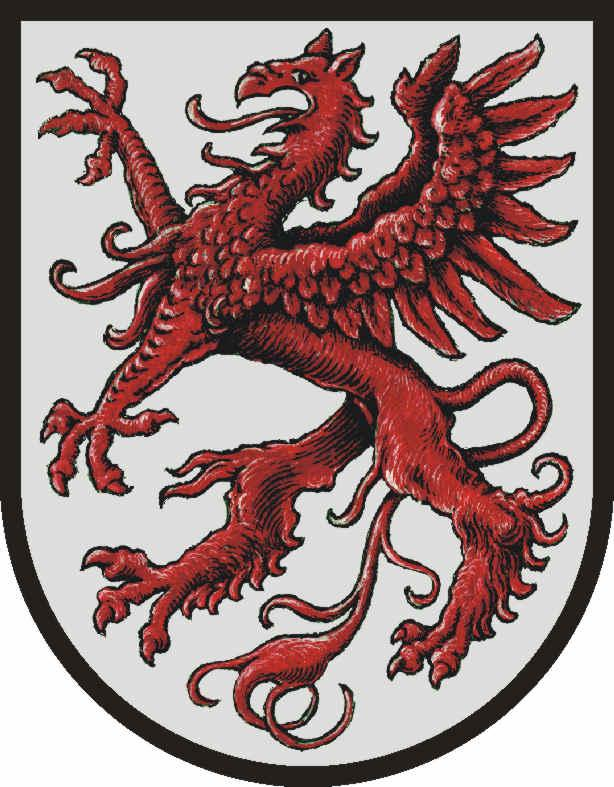
- Coat of arms

- Location within Austria
- Coordinates: 47°20′25″N 15°59′27″E
- Country: Austria
- State: Styria
- District: Hartberg-Fürstenfeld

Government
  - Mayor: Johann Handler (ÖVP)

Area
  - Total: 45.69 km^{2} (17.64 sq mi)
- Elevation: 383 m (1,257 ft)

Population (2018-01-01)
  - Total: 3,082
  - Density: 67.45/km^{2} (174.7/sq mi)
- Time zone: UTC+1 (CET)
  - Summer (DST): UTC+2 (CEST)
- Postal code: 8232, 8230, 8233
- Area code: 03338
- Vehicle registration: HB
- Website: www.grafendorf-hartberg. steiermark.at

Grafendorf bei Hartberg is a municipality in the district of Hartberg-Fürstenfeld in Styria, Austria.

== History ==
The area around Grafendorf was inhabited already in the Neolithic Age, as some finds prove. Then the Romans around 15 BC. The current municipal area became part of the province of Noricum. Some finds indicate a settlement.

Subsequently, the Slavs settled in the municipality. At the end of the 8th century, Charlemagne made it to the Frankish Empire. Soon after, the eastern Styria was conquered by the Hungarians, so that the settlement only after the reconquest by Henry III. could be continued.

In 1144 Grafendorf was first mentioned and very well known. In 1158, Vornbach Abbey became landlord through a donation, the administration was carried out by the provost Gloggnitz. In the possession of Vornbach Abbey Grafendorf remained until the Reichsdeputationshauptschluss in 1803, after which it fell to the state and auctioned in 1815 to the owner of a glass factory.

From 1831 to 1838, the Vorau abbey was the landlord of Grafendorf, before becoming an independent municipality in 1849. In 1964 Grafendorf was raised to market township.
