= Hartl =

- Municipality
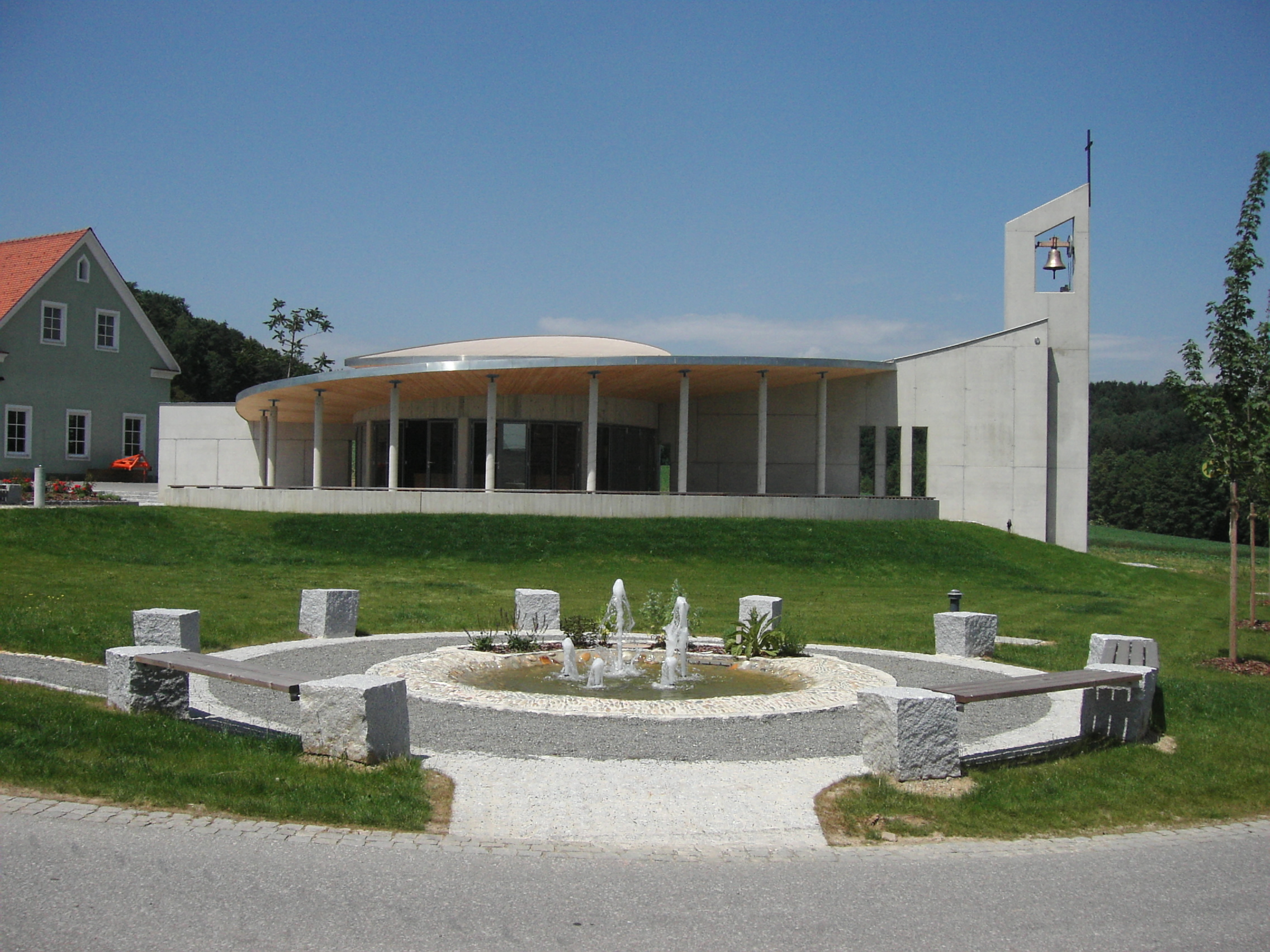
- Hartl chapel

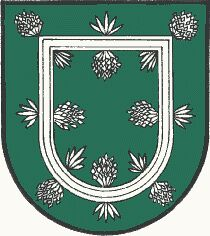
- Coat of arms

- Location within Austria
- Coordinates: 47°10′20″N 15°54′42″E
- Country: Austria
- State: Styria
- District: Hartberg-Fürstenfeld

Government
  - Mayor: Hermann Grassl (ÖVP)

Area
  - Total: 33.75 km^{2} (13.03 sq mi)
- Elevation: 430 m (1,410 ft)

Population (2018-01-01)
  - Total: 2,130
  - Density: 63.1/km^{2} (163/sq mi)
- Time zone: UTC+1 (CET)
  - Summer (DST): UTC+2 (CEST)
- Postal code: 8224, 8265, 8272
- Area code: 03334
- Vehicle registration: HB
- Website: www.hartl.steiermark.at

Hartl is a municipality in the district of Hartberg-Fürstenfeld in Styria, Austria.
