= Ottendorf an der Rittschein =

- Municipality
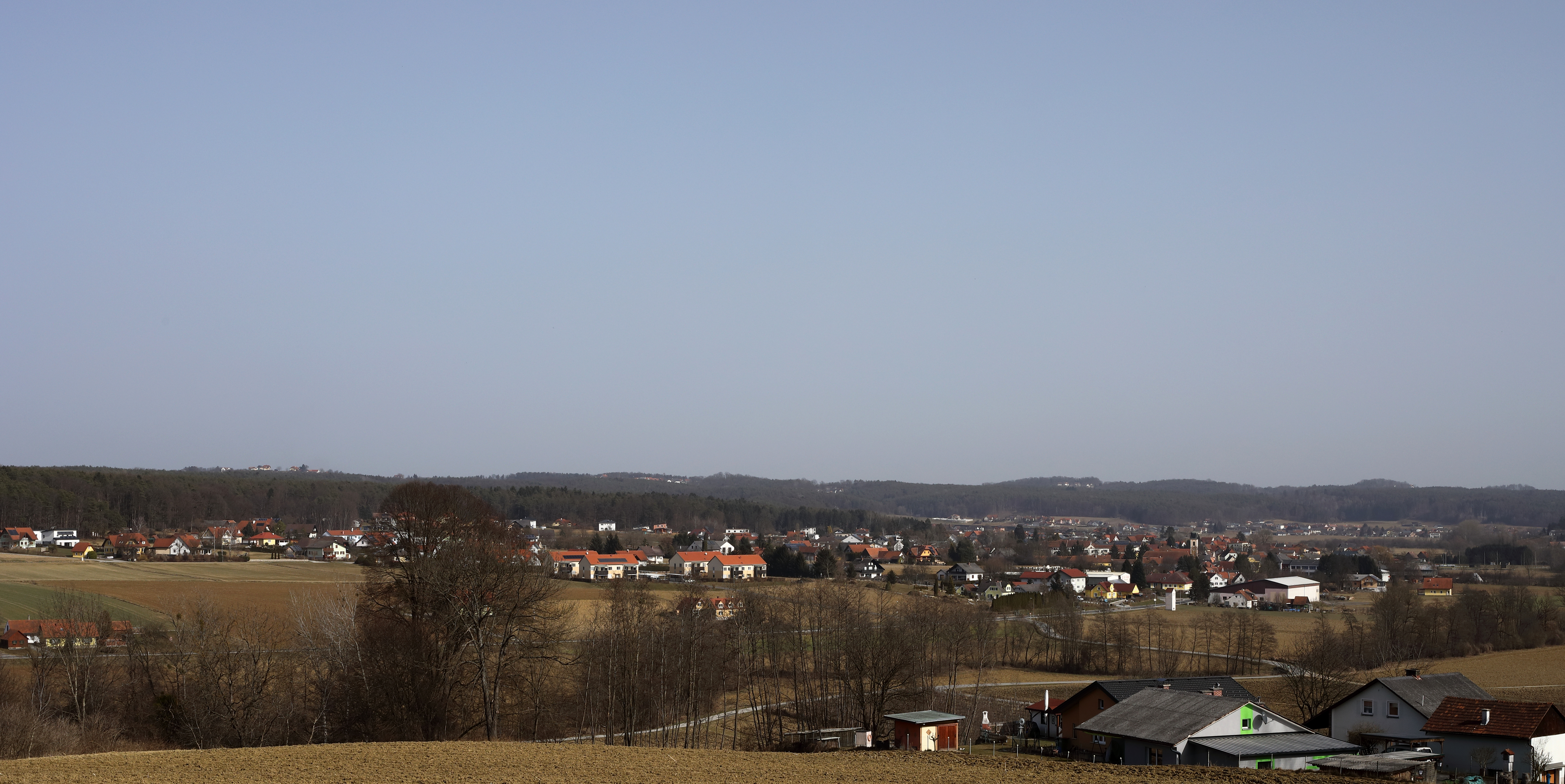
- Remote view of Ottendorf

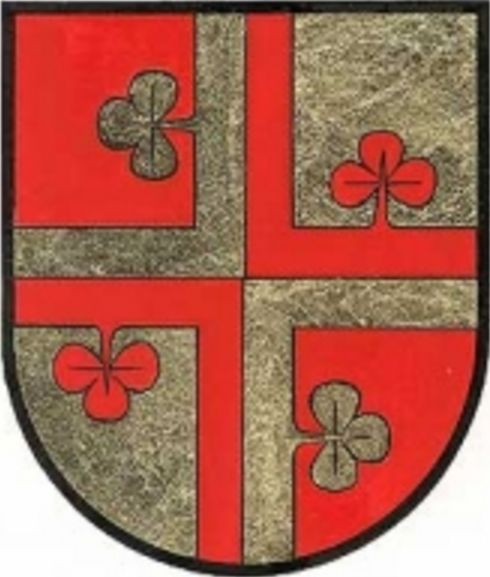
- Coat of arms

- Location within Austria
- Coordinates: 47°02′56″N 15°54′02″E
- Country: Austria
- State: Styria
- District: Hartberg-Fürstenfeld

Government
  - Mayor: Josef Haberl (ÖVP)

Area
  - Total: 14.27 km^{2} (5.51 sq mi)
- Elevation: 297 m (974 ft)

Population (2018-01-01)
  - Total: 1,560
  - Density: 109/km^{2} (283/sq mi)
- Time zone: UTC+1 (CET)
  - Summer (DST): UTC+2 (CEST)
- Postal code: 8312
- Area code: 03114
- Vehicle registration: FF
- Website: www.ottendorf-rittschein. steiermark.at

Ottendorf an der Rittschein is a municipality in the district of Hartberg-Fürstenfeld in Styria, Austria.
