= Altenmarkt bei Fürstenfeld =

- Former municipality
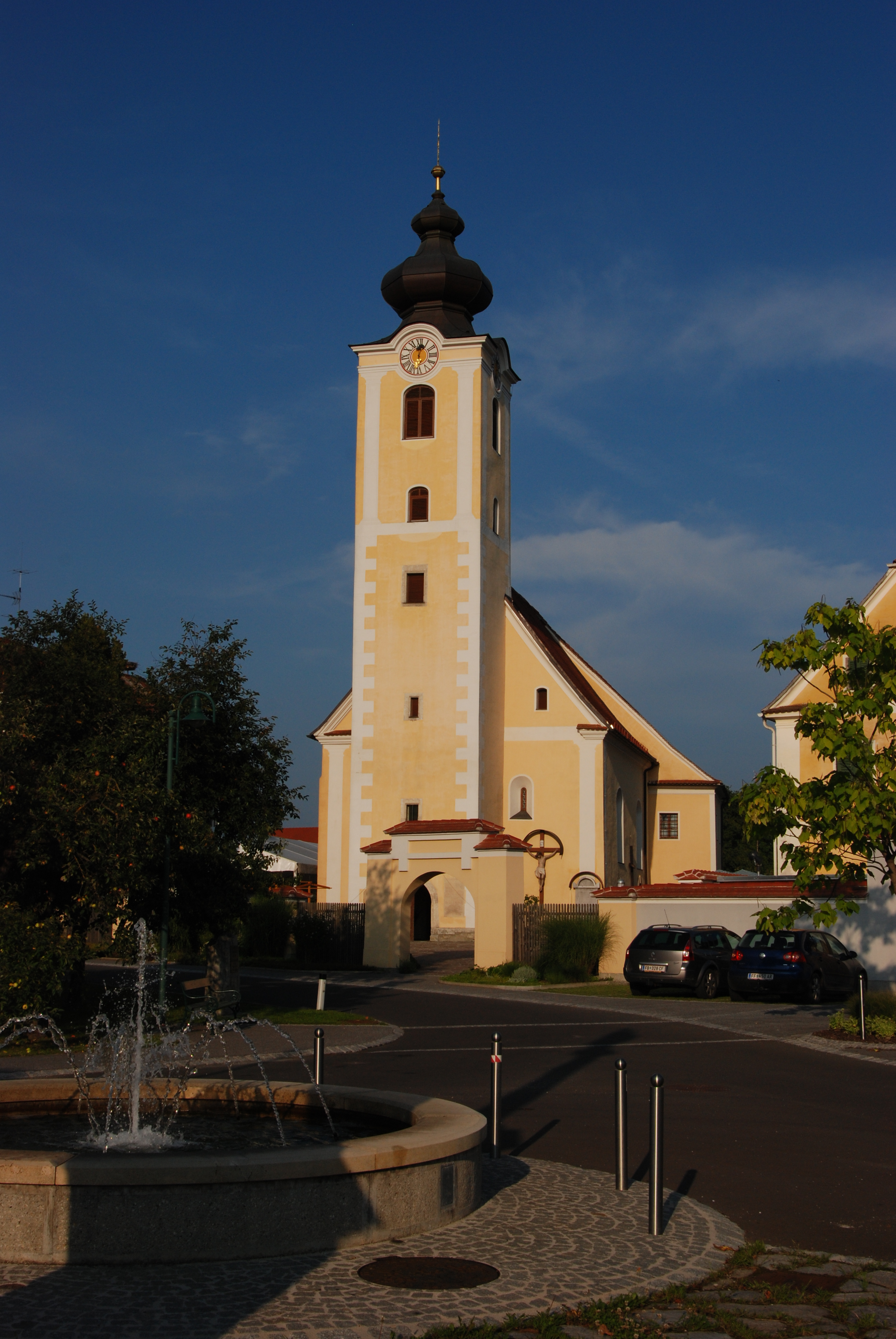
- Altenmarkt parish church

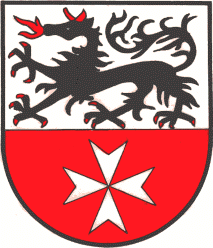
- Coat of arms

- Location within Austria
- Coordinates: 47°04′00″N 16°03′00″E
- Country: Austria
- State: Styria
- District: Hartberg-Fürstenfeld

Area
  - Total: 19.98 km^{2} (7.71 sq mi)
- Elevation: 461 m (1,512 ft)

Population (1 January 2016)
  - Total: 1,134
  - Density: 56.76/km^{2} (147.0/sq mi)
- Time zone: UTC+1 (CET)
  - Summer (DST): UTC+2 (CEST)
- Postal code: 8280
- Area code: 03382
- Vehicle registration: FF
- Website: fuerstenfeld.at

Altenmarkt bei Fürstenfeld is a former municipality in the district of Hartberg-Fürstenfeld in Styria, Austria. Since the 2015 Styria municipal structural reform, it has been part of the municipality Fürstenfeld.
