= Neudau =

- Municipality
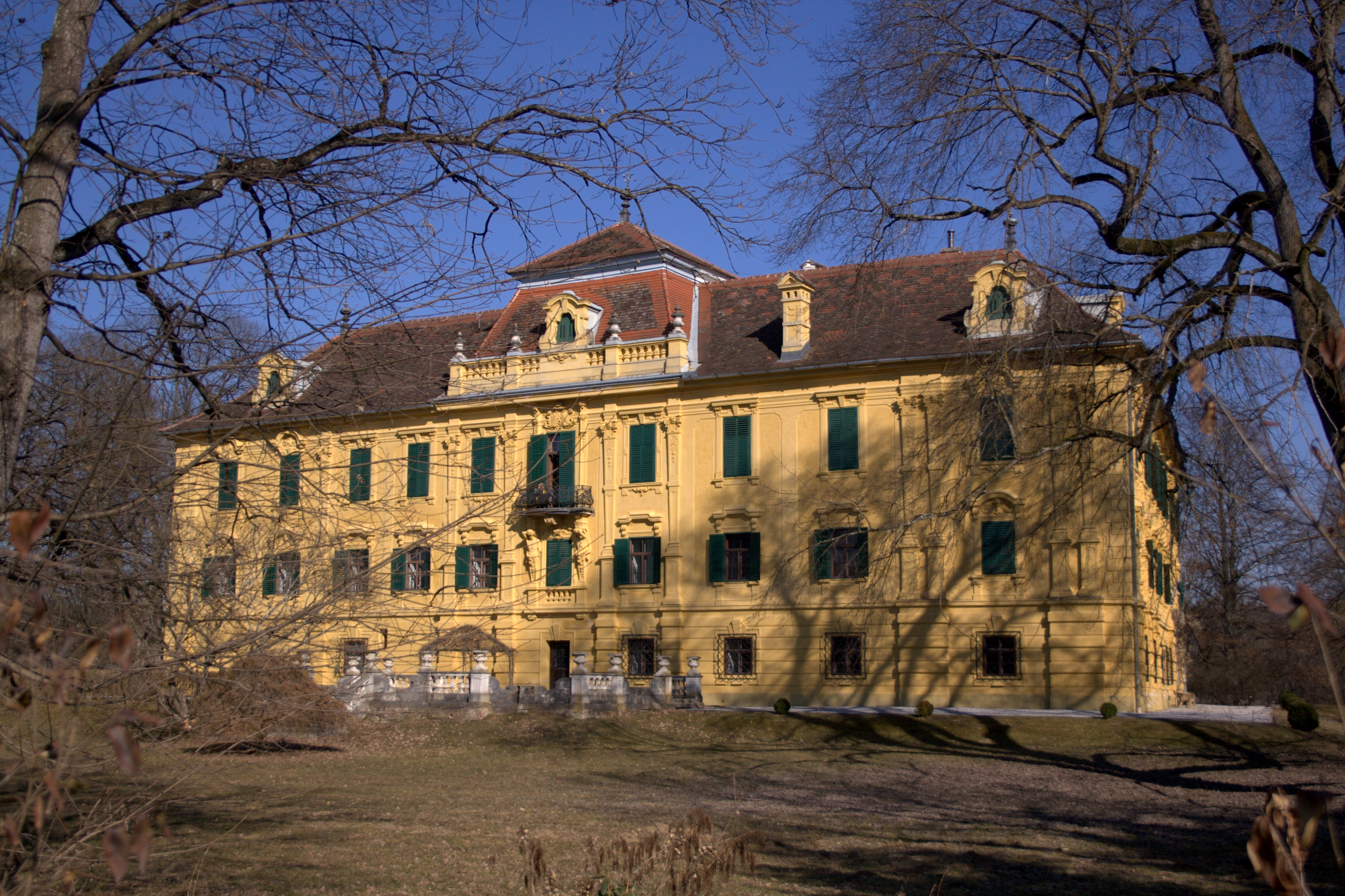
- Wasser Castle in Neudau

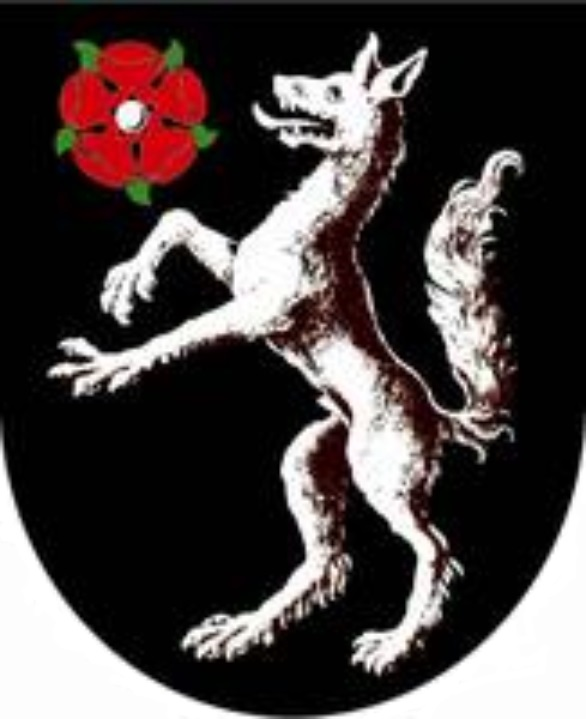
- Coat of arms

- Location within Austria
- Coordinates: 47°10′28″N 16°06′11″E
- Country: Austria
- State: Styria
- District: Hartberg-Fürstenfeld

Government
  - Mayor: Dr. Wolfgang Dolesch (SPÖ)

Area
  - Total: 13.66 km^{2} (5.27 sq mi)
- Elevation: 289 m (948 ft)

Population (2018-01-01)
  - Total: 1,495
  - Density: 109.4/km^{2} (283.5/sq mi)
- Time zone: UTC+1 (CET)
  - Summer (DST): UTC+2 (CEST)
- Postal code: 8292
- Area code: 03383
- Vehicle registration: HB
- Website: https://www.neudau.gv.at/startseite

Neudau is a municipality in the district of Hartberg-Fürstenfeld in Styria, Austria.
