= Großwilfersdorf =

- Municipality
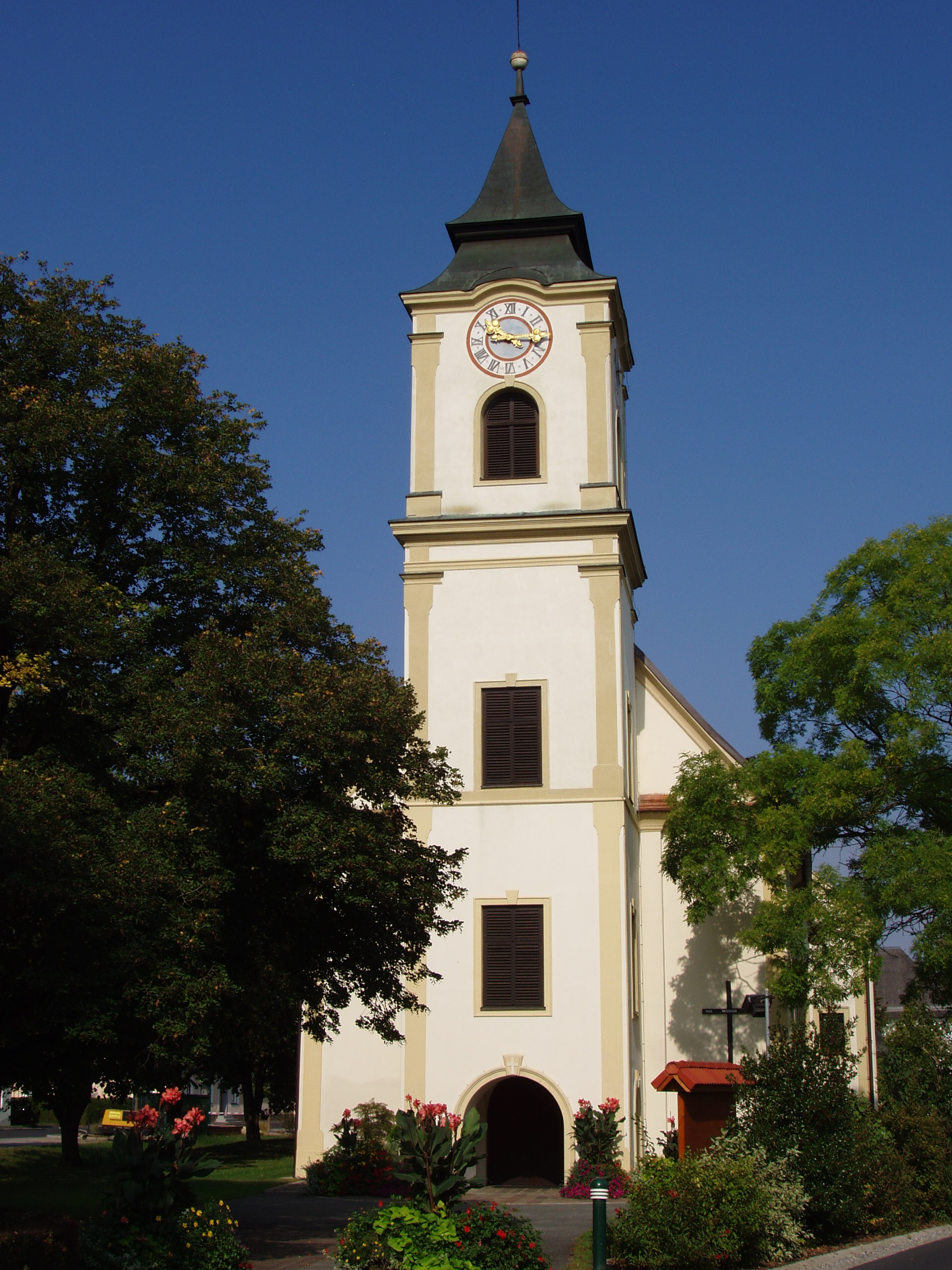
- Großwilfersdorf parish church

- Coat of arms

- Location within Austria
- Coordinates: 47°05′00″N 16°00′00″E
- Country: Austria
- State: Styria
- District: Hartberg-Fürstenfeld

Government
  - Mayor: Johann Urschler (ÖVP)

Area
  - Total: 38.25 km^{2} (14.77 sq mi)
- Elevation: 274 m (899 ft)

Population (2018-01-01)
  - Total: 2,071
  - Density: 54.14/km^{2} (140.2/sq mi)
- Time zone: UTC+1 (CET)
  - Summer (DST): UTC+2 (CEST)
- Postal code: 8263
- Area code: 03385
- Vehicle registration: FF
- Website: www.grosswilfersdorf. steiermark.at

Großwilfersdorf is a municipality in the district of Hartberg-Fürstenfeld in Styria, Austria.
