= Hartberg-Fürstenfeld District =

Coordinates: 47.3°N 15.95°E

Hartberg-Fürstenfeld District Bezirk Hartberg-Fürstenfeld
- District
- Country: Austria
- State: Styria
- Number of municipalities: 36
- Administrative seat: Hartberg

Government
  - District Governor: Kerstin Raith-Schweighofer

Area
  - Total: 1,220 km^{2} (470 sq mi)

Population (2014)
  - Total: 89,252
  - Density: 73.2/km^{2} (189/sq mi)
- Time zone: UTC+01:00 (CET)
  - Summer (DST): UTC+02:00 (CEST)
- Vehicle registration: HF
- NUTS code: AT224

Hartberg-Fürstenfeld (German: [ˈhartbɛrɡ ˈfʏrstn̩fɛld]) is a district in Styria, Austria. It came into effect on 1 January 2013 by merging the districts of Hartberg and Fürstenfeld.

== Municipalities ==
Since the 2025 Styria municipal structural reform, it consists of the following municipalities:

- Bad Blumau
- Bad Loipersdorf
- Bad Waltersdorf
- Buch-Sankt Magdalena
- Burgau
- Dechantskirchen
- Ebersdorf
- Feistritztal
- Friedberg
- Fürstenfeld
- Grafendorf bei Hartberg
- Greinbach
- Großsteinbach
- Großwilfersdorf
- Hartberg
- Hartberg Umgebung
- Hartl
- Ilz
- Kaindorf
- Lafnitz
- Neudau
- Ottendorf an der Rittschein
- Pinggau
- Pöllau
- Pöllauberg
- Rohr bei Hartberg
- Rohrbach an der Lafnitz
- Sankt Jakob im Walde
- Sankt Johann in der Haide
- Sankt Lorenzen am Wechsel
- Schäffern
- Stubenberg
- Vorau
- Waldbach-Mönichwald
- Wenigzell
