= Norbert =

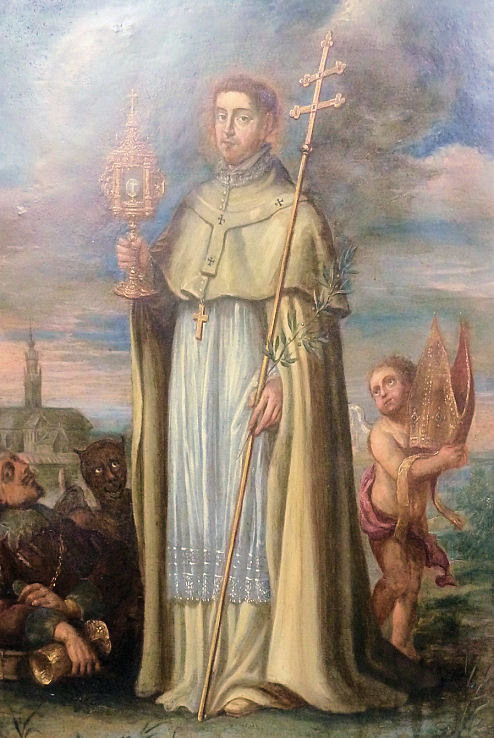
- Norbert of Xanten
- Gender: Male
- Languages: Germanic, Hungarian, French, Polish, Slovak

Origin
- Meaning: nord + beraht (north + bright)
- Region of origin: Germanic

Other names
- Nicknames: Norb, Norbie, or Bert
- Related names: Norbaer, Norberto, Bert

Norbert is a Germanic given name and infrequent surname, from nord "north" and berht "bright".

== People with the given name ==
=== Academia ===
- Norbert A'Campo (born 1941), Swiss mathematician
- Norbert Angermann (born 1936), German historian
- Norbert Berkowitz (1924–2001), Canadian scientist
- Norbert Bischofberger (born 1954), Austrian scientist
- Norbert Bolz (born 1953), German philosopher
- Norbert Elias (1897–1990), German Jewish sociologist
- Norbert Fuhr (born 1956), German computer scientist
- Norbert Geng (born 1965), German legal scholar
- Norbert Guterman (1900–1984), American translator
- Norbert von Hellingrath (1888–1916), German literary scholar
- Norbert Hirschhorn (born 1938), American physician
- Norbert Hornstein, American linguist
- Norbert Jokl (1877–1942?), Austrian Jewish linguist
- Norbert Klatt (1949–2015), German religious scholar
- Norbert Leser (1933–2014), Austrian political scientist
- Norbert Lynton (1927–2007), British art historian
- Norbert Rillieux (1806–1894), American inventor and engineer
- Norbert M. Samuelson (1936–2022), American Jewish philosopher
- Norbert Wiener (1894–1964), American mathematician and philosopher
- Norbert Zeh, German computer scientist

=== Arts and literature ===
- Norbert Francis Attard (born 1951), Maltese artist
- Norbert Balatsch (1928–2020), Austrian conductor and choirmaster
- Norbert Bisky (born 1970), German painter
- Norbert Blei (1935–2013), American writer
- Norbert Brainin (1923–2005), Austrian Jewish violinist
- Norbert Brodine (1896–1970), American cinematographer
- Norbert Brunner (artist) (born 1969), Austrian artist
- Norbert Burgmüller (1810–1836), German composer
- Norbert Leo Butz (born 1967), American actor
- Norbert Christian (1925–1976), German actor
- Norbert Daum (born 1948), Austrian musician
- Norbert Davis (1909–1949), American writer
- Norbert Ernst (born 1977), Austrian opera singer
- Norbert Falk (1872–1932), Austrian screenwriter
- Norbert Frýd (1913–1976), Czech writer
- Norbert Gastell (1929–2015), German voice actor
- Norbert Glanzberg (1910–2001), French Jewish composer
- Norbert Goeneutte (1854–1894), French illustrator
- Norbert Grund (1717–1767), Czech painter
- Norbert Hummelt (born 1962), German poet
- Norbert Jacques (1880–1954), Luxembourgish novelist
- Norbert Klassen (1941–2011), German performance artist
- Norbert Kraft (born 1950), Canadian musician
- Norbert Kricke (1922–1984), German sculptor
- Norbert Krief (born 1956), French musician
- Norbert Kuchinke (1940–2013), German actor
- Norbert Kückelmann (1930–2017), German film director
- Norbert Lichý (1964–2024), Czech actor
- Norbert H. J. Nozy (born 1952), Belgian musician
- Norbert Rohringer (1927–2009), Austrian actor
- Norbert Scheuer (born 1951), German writer
- Norbert Weisser (born 1946), German actor
- Norbert Zeilberger (1969–2012), Austrian musician

=== Politics ===
- Norbert Aleksiewicz (1948–1994), Polish politician
- Norbert Barlicki (1880–1941), Polish politician
- Norbert Barthle (born 1952), German politician
- Norbert Blüm (1935–2020), German politician
- Norbert Darabos (born 1964), Austrian politician
- Norbert Dumas (1812–1869), French Canadian politician
- Norbert Dumont, Luxembourgish politician
- Norbert Erdős (born 1972), Hungarian politician
- Norbert Geis (born 1939), German politician
- Norbert Glante (born 1952), German politician
- Norbert Haupert (born 1940), Luxembourgish politician
- Norbert van Heyst, (born 1944), German Army commander
- Norbert Hofer (born 1971), Austrian politician
- Norbert Hougardy (1909–1985), Belgian politician
- Norbert Keenan (1864–1954), Australian politician
- Norbert Klein (politician) (1956–2021), Dutch politician
- Norbert Lammert (born 1948), German politician
- Norbert Loizeau, Seychellois politician
- Norbert Mamangy, Malagasy politician
- Norbert Röttgen (born 1965), German politician

=== Religion ===
- Norbert of Xanten (c. 1080–1134), Roman Catholic bishop and saint
- Norbert Brunner (bishop) (born 1942), Swiss Roman Catholic bishop
- Norbert D'Souza, Indian Roman Catholic leader
- Norbert Dorsey (1929–2013), American Roman Catholic bishop
- Norbert Felix Gaughan (1921–1999), American Roman Catholic bishop
- Norbert Klein (bishop) (1866–1933), Czech Roman Catholic bishop

=== Sports ===
- Norbert Ágh (born 1970), Hungarian swimmer
- Norbert Alblas (born 1994), Dutch footballer
- Norbert Balogh (born 1996), Hungarian footballer
- Norbert Beuls (1957–2014), Belgian footballer
- Norbert Bíró (born 1974), Hungarian Paralympic judoka
- Norbert Brami (born 1937), Tunisian fencer
- Norbert Brige (born 1964), French athlete
- Norbert Brinkmann (born 1952), German footballer
- Norbert Csernyánszki (born 1976), Hungarian footballer
- Norbert Csiki (born 1991), Hungarian footballer
- Norbert Csölle (born 1992), Hungarian footballer
- Norbert Callens (1924–2005), Belgian cyclist
- Norbert De Naeghel (born 1949), Belgian footballer
- Norbert Dickel (born 1961), German footballer
- Norbert Dobeleit (born 1964), German athlete
- Norbert Domnik (born 1964), Austrian triathlete
- Norbert Dürpisch (born 1952), German cyclist
- Norbert Düwel (born 1968), German football manager
- Norbert Eder (1955–2019), German footballer
- Norbert Eilenfeldt (born 1956), German footballer
- Norbert Eschmann (1933–2009), French-Swiss footballer
- Norbert Ettner (born 1977), German shooter
- Norbert Farkas (alpine skier) (born 1992), Hungarian alpine skier
- Norbert Farkas (footballer born 1977), Hungarian footballer
- Norbert Farkas (footballer born 1992), Hungarian footballer
- Norbert Feketics (born 1996), Romanian footballer
- Norbert Felsinger (born 1939), Austrian figure skater
- Norbert Fruvall, Indian footballer
- Norbert Gasser (born 1957), Italian ice hockey player
- Norbert Gombos (born 1990), Slovak tennis player
- Norbert Grudzinski (born 1977), German footballer
- Norbert Gyömbér (born 1992), Slovak footballer
- Norbert Hahn (born 1954), German luger
- Norbert Hajdú (born 1982), Hungarian footballer
- Norbert Hauata (born 1979), French Polynesian football referee
- Norbert Haug (born 1952), German motorsport executive
- Norbert Hayes (1896–1945), American football player
- Norbert Haymamba (born 1999), Cameroonian footballer
- Norbert Heffler (born 1995), Hungarian footballer
- Norbert Hof (1944–2020), Austrian footballer
- Norbert Hofmann (footballer, born 1951), German footballer
- Norbert Hofmann (footballer, born 1972), German footballer
- Norbert Holzknecht (born 1976), Austrian alpine skier
- Norbert Holík (born 1972), Slovak paralympian
- Norbert Hosnyánszky (born 1984), Hungarian water polo player
- Norbert Hrnčár (born 1970), Slovak football manager and former player
- Norbert Huber (born 1964), Italian luger
- Norbert Huda (born 1950), German diver
- Norbert István (born 1996), Romanian footballer
- Norbert Janzon (born 1950), German footballer
- Norbert Jaskot (born 1971), Polish fencer
- Norbert Johannsen (born 1948), German footballer
- Norbert Kaján (born 2004), Hungarian footballer
- Norbert Kállai (born 1984), Hungarian footballer
- Norbert Kalucza (born 1986), Hungarian boxer
- Norbert Kerckhove (1932–2006), Belgian cyclist
- Norbert Kerényi (born 1976), Hungarian footballer
- Norbert Keßlau (born 1962), German rower
- Norbert Klaar (born 1954), German shooter
- Norbert Kiss (born 1985), Hungarian racing driver
- Norbert Kiss (bowler) (born 1980), Hungarian nine-pin bowling player
- Norbert Kovács (footballer) (born 1977), Hungarian footballer
- Norbert Kovács (swimmer) (born 1988), Hungarian swimmer
- Norbert König (born 1958), German sports presenter
- Norbert Könyves (born 1989), Hungarian footballer
- Norbert Kundrák (born 1999), Hungarian footballer
- Norbert Lattenstein (born 1984), Hungarian footballer
- Norbert Lichtenegger (born 1951), Austrian footballer
- Norbert Lipusz (born 1986), Hungarian footballer
- Norbert Madaras (born 1979), Hungarian water polo player
- Norbert Manyande (born 1979), Zimbabwean cricketer
- Norbert Mazány (born 1978), Hungarian tennis player
- Norbert Meier (born 1958), German football manager and former player
- Norbert Mészáros (born 1980), Hungarian footballer
- Norbert Misiak (born 1994), Polish footballer
- Norbert Mueller (1906–1956), Canadian ice hockey player
- Norbert Nachtweih (born 1957), German footballer
- Norbert Nagy (born 1994), Hungarian racing driver
- Norbert Némedi (born 1977), Hungarian footballer
- Norbert Németh (footballer) (born 1981), Hungarian footballer
- Norbert Nigbur (born 1948), German footballer
- Norbert Növényi (born 1957), Hungarian wrestler, kick-boxer and actor
- Norbert Owona (1951–2021), Cameroonian footballer
- Norbert Pacławski (born 2004), Polish footballer
- Norbert Palásthy (born 1981), Hungarian footballer
- Norbert Pintér (born 1992), Hungarian footballer
- Norbert Prünster (born 1954), Italian ice hockey player
- Norbert Rivasz-Tóth (born 1996), Hungarian javelin thrower
- Norbert Sárközi (born 1993), Hungarian footballer
- Norbert Schlegel (born 1961), German footballer
- Norbert Sipos (born 1981), Hungarian footballer
- Norbert Sterle (1918–1943), American ice hockey player
- Norbert "Nobby" Stiles (1942–2020), English footballer
- Norbert Szabián (born 1982), Hungarian sport shooter
- Norbert Szélpál (born 1996), Hungarian footballer
- Norbert Szemerédi (born 1993), Hungarian footballer
- Norbert Szendrei (born 2000), Hungarian footballer
- Norbert Tajti (born 1983), Hungarian footballer
- Norbert Thimm (born 1949), German basketball player
- Norbert Tóth (basketball) (born 1986), Hungarian basketball player
- Norbert Tóth (footballer) (born 1976), Hungarian footballer
- Norbert Tóth (racing driver) (born 1998), Hungarian racing driver
- Norbert Trandafir (born 1988), Romanian swimmer
- Norbert Trieloff (born 1957), German footballer
- Norbert Tyrajski (born 1975), Polish footballer
- Norbert Varga (born 1980), Romanian footballer
- Norbert Wagner (footballer) (born 1961), German footballer
- Norbert Wojtuszek (born 2001), Polish footballer
- Norbert Zana (born 1985), Hungarian footballer
- Norbert Zsivóczky (born 1988), Hungarian footballer

=== Other fields ===
- Norberto Carrodegoas (1936–2013), better known under his pseudonym Norbert Degoas, Argentine journalist
- Norbert Casteret (1897–1987), French cave explorer
- Norbert Denef (born 1949), German victim's advocate
- Norbert Holl, German diplomat
- Norbert Holm (1895–1962), German soldier
- Norbert Kröcher (1950–2016), German left-wing revolutionary
- Norbert Lossau (born 1962), German librarian

== People with the surname ==
- Guillaume Norbert (born 1980), French footballer
- Ludwig Norbert (born 1983), French footballer

== See also ==
- Hurricane Norbert (disambiguation)
- Norbert (dog)
- Norberto
- Norbit
- St. Norbert (disambiguation)
