= Brunner (surname) =

Brunner is a German surname. It originated from the Middle High German word Brunne meaning spring or water well. It can also refer to people from places named Brunn. It may refer to:

== A ==
- Adolf Brunner (composer) (1901–1992), Swiss composer
- Albert Brunner (1918–1943), German World War II flying ace
- Alois Brunner (1912–2001 or 2010), Austrian Nazi SS concentration camp war criminal
- Alex Brunner (born 1973), Italian football coach and former goalkeeper
- Anna Brunner (singer), German metal singer
- Anna Brunner (violinist) (born 1972), Swiss violinist
- Arnold W. Brunner (1857–1925), American architect

== B ==
- Benny Brunner (born 1954), Israeli-Dutch filmmaker

== C ==
- Carl Brunner von Wattenwyl (1823–1914), Swiss entomologist
- Cédric Brunner (born 1994), Swiss footballer
- Chantal Brunner (born 1970), New Zealand sprinter and long jumper
- Charles Brunner (born 1952), American politician
- Christiane Brunner (1947–2025), Swiss politician and advocate
- Christiane Brunner (Austrian politician) (born 1976), Austrian politician
- Conrad Brunner (monk) (died 1410), Swiss Benedictine abbot
- Conrad Brunner (physician) (1859–1927), Swiss physician, surgeon and medical historian
- Constantin Brunner (1862–1937), pen name of German philosopher Arjeh Yehuda Wertheimer

== D ==
- Damien Brunner (born 1986), Swiss ice hockey player
- David B. Brunner (1835–1903), American politician
- Dominik Brunner (1959–2009), German businessman who died protecting schoolchildren from teens

== E ==
- Eddie Brunner (1912–1960), Swiss jazz musician and bandleader
- Edouard Brunner (1932–2007), Swiss diplomat
- Emil Brunner (1889–1966), Swiss theologian
- Eric Brunner (cyclist) (born 1998), American cyclist
- Eric Brunner (epidemiologist) (born 1953), British epidemiologist
- Eric Brunner (soccer) (born 1986), American soccer player
- Ernst Brunner (1901–1979), Swiss documentary and ethnographic photographer
- Ernst Brunner (born 1950), Swedish writer and literary scholar
- Eveline Brunner (born 1996), Swiss figure skater

== F ==
- Ferdinand Brunner (1870–1945), Austrian landscape painter
- Fernand Brunner (1920–1991), Swiss philosopher
- Felix Brunner (1897–1982), British politician and business owner
- Francis de Sales Brunner (1795–1859), Swiss Catholic missionary priest in the United States
- Frank Brunner (born 1949), American comic book artist
- Franz Brunner (handballer) (1913–1991), Austrian handballer
- Franz Brunner (wrestler) (1931–2014), Austrian wrestler

== G ==
- Gerwald Claus-Brunner (1972–2016), German murderer and politician
- Greg Brunner, American-Swiss basketball player
- Guido Brunner (1930–1997), Spanish-born German diplomat and politician

== H ==
- Heinrich Brunner (1840–1915), Austrian legal scholar
- Helena Brunner, Australian Paralympic swimmer
- Henry Brunner (1838–1916), English chemist
- Horst Brünner (1929–2008), East German colonel general and deputy Defense Minister
- Hugo Brunner (born 1935), Lord Lieutenant of Oxfordshire, England

== J ==
- Jane Brunner (fl. 1996–2013), American politician and activist
- Jean Brunner or Johann Josef Brunner (1804–1862), Swiss-born, French measuring instrument maker and mechanic
- Jennifer Brunner (born 1957), American attorney, politician, and judge, former Ohio Secretary of State
- Johann Conrad Brunner (1653–1727), Swiss anatomist
- John Brunner (disambiguation)
- José Brunner (born 1954), Swiss-born Israeli historian of science, professor emeritus
- Josef Brunner (1928–2012), German politician
- Josefine Brunner (1909–1943), Austrian socialist, resistance member and victim of the Nazi regime

== K ==
- Karl Brunner (died 1867) (1796–1867), Swiss chemist
- Karl Brunner (economist) (1916–1989), Swiss economist
- Karl Brunner (politician, born 1905) (1905–1951), German politician
- Karl Brunner (SS general) (1900–1980), German SS general
- Karl-Heinz Brunner (born 1953), German politician
- Kaspar Brunner (died 1561), Swiss mechanic who constructed the clockwork of the Zytglogge, Bern's medieval clock-tower
- Kate Brunner (born 1972), British judge

== L ==
- Lucas Brunner (born 1967), Swiss chess grandmaster

== M ==
- Magnus Brunner (born 1972), Austrian EU-commissoner
- Marisa Brunner (born 1982), Swiss football goalkeeper
- Martin Brunner (born 1963), Swiss football player
- Mary Brunner (born 1943), American criminal and former Manson Family member
- Maurice Brunner (born 1991), Swiss footballer
- Meta Brunner (1886–1971), Swiss liaison to Indian anti-colonialists
- Michael Brunner (born 1995), Swiss curler
- Michelle Brunner (1953–2011), British bridge player, writer and teacher

== N ==
- Nina Brunner (born 1995), Swiss professional beach volleyball player
- Norbert Brunner (artist) (born 1969), Austrian artist
- Norbert Brunner (bishop) (born 1942), Swiss Catholic prelate and bishop

== O ==
- Otto Brunner (1898–1982), Austrian historian

== P ==
- Paris Brunner (born 2006), German footballer
- Pat W. Brunner (1903–1971), American politician

== R ==
- Robert Brunner (born 1958), American industrial designer
- Roland Brunner (born 1970), Austrian ice speed skater
- Rudolf Brunner (1827–1894), Swiss politician and President of the Swiss National Council

== S ==
- Samuel Brunner (1790–1844), Swiss physician and naturalist
- Scott Brunner (born 1957), American National Football League quarterback
- Sebastian Brunner (1814–1893), Austrian Catholic writer
- Sophie Brunner (born 1995), American basketball player
- Stephan Brunner (born 1961), Costa Rican politician and economist, first vice president of Costa Rica 2022–2025
- Stephanie Brunner (born 1994), Austrian alpine ski racer

== T ==
- Theo Brunner (born 1985), American professional beach volleyball player
- Thomas Brunner (1821–1874), English-born New Zealand surveyor and explorer
- Thomas Brunner (footballer) (born 1962), German football coach and former player
- Thomas J. Brunner (born 1958), American politician
- Tobias Brunner (1602–c. 1665), German organ builder
- Toni Brunner (born 1974), Swiss politician

== U ==
- Ursel Brunner (1941–2024), West German freestyle swimmer

== V ==
- Vratislav Hugo Brunner, Czech illustrator

== W ==
- Walter Brunner (born 1948), Swiss building contractor
- William F. Brunner (1887–1965), American politician
- William Otto Brunner (1878–1958), Swiss astronomer

== Fictional characters ==
- Hermann Brunner, from the Polish TV series More Than Life at Stake (Stawka większa niż życie)

== See also ==
- Carl Brunner von Wattenwyl (1823–1914), Swiss geologist and physicist
