= Lichtenegger =

Lichtenegger is a surname. Notable people with the surname include:

- Donna Lichtenegger (born 1956), American politician
- Elmar Lichtenegger (born 1974), Austrian hurdler
- Norbert Lichtenegger (born 1951), Austrian former footballer
- Vatroslav Lichtenegger (1809–1885), Croatian composer
- Mathilde Mallinger, born Lichtenegger
