= Anna Brunner =

Anna Brunner may refer to:

- Anna Brunner (singer), German singer
- Anna Brunner (violinist) (born 1972), Swiss violinist

== See also ==
- Brunner (surname)
