= Brunn =

Brunn or Brünn may refer to:

== Places ==
=== Germany ===
- Brunn, Mecklenburg-Vorpommern, a municipality in Mecklenburg-Vorpommern
- Brunn, Upper Palatinate, a town in Bavaria
- Brünn, Thuringia, a municipality in Thuringia
- Brunn, part of the municipality of Reichenbach im Vogtland, Saxony
- Brunn, an exclave of Nuremberg, Bavaria

=== Austria ===
- Bad Fischau-Brunn, Lower Austria
- Brunn am Gebirge, a town in Lower Austria
- Brunn an der Wild, a town in Lower Austria
- Brunn im Felde, part of the municipality Gedersdorf, Lower Austria
- Johnsdorf-Brunn, a municipality in Styria
- Pölfing-Brunn, a municipality in Styria

=== Sweden ===
- Brunn, a village in the Swedish urban area of Hedesunda
- Brunn, Sweden, in Värmdö Municipality, Stockholm County
- Sätra brunn, a locality situated in Västmanland County

=== Other countries ===
- Brünn, German name of Brno, Czech Republic
- Brunn, German name of Bezrzecze, Police County, Poland

== Other uses ==
- Brunn (surname)
- Brunn & Company, American coachbuilder

== See also ==
- Brunning
