= Zeh =

Zeh or ZEH, may refer to:

- Zeh (surname), a German surname and a list of people with this surname
- Zeh, Nakhlestan (Persian: زه), Nakhlestan Rural District, Central District, Kahnuj County, Kerman, Iran; a village, the capital of Nakhlestan
- Zhenjiang South railway station (station code ZEH), Zhenjiang, Jiangsu, People's Republic of China; a train station on the Beijing–Shanghai high-speed rail
- Eastern Hongshuihe Zhuang (ISO 639 language code zeh), a Northern Tai language found in Guangxi, China
- Zero-energy house (ZEH), net-zero housing, a house with net-zero energy consumption

== See also ==
- Zeh-e Kalut (Persian: زه کلوت), Central District, Jazmurian County, Kerman, Iran; a city, the capital of Jazmurian and Central
- Zehe (disambiguation)
