= Geng =

Geng may refer to:

- Geng (dish) (羹), a thick soup
- Geng (surname) (耿), a Chinese surname
- Norbert Geng (born 1965), German lawyer and professor
- 21359 Geng, an asteroid
- Gen.G, an esports organisation
