= Norbertas =

Male given name

- Gender: Male
- Language: Lithuanian
- Name day: 6 June

Origin
- Region of origin: Lithuania

Other names
- Related names: Norbert

Norbertas is a Lithuanian masculine given name. It is a cognate of the name Norbert. Individuals with the name include:

- Norbertas Giga (born 1995), Lithuanian basketball player
- Norbertas Vėlius (1938–1996), Lithuanian folklorist
