= Conrad Brunner =

Conrad Brunner may refer to:

- Conrad Brunner (monk) (died 1410), Swiss Benedictine monk
- Conrad Brunner (physician) (1859–1927), Swiss physician, surgeon and medical historian

== See also ==
- Johann Conrad Brunner (1653–1727), Swiss anatomist
