= Norbert Brunner =

Norbert Brunner may refer to:

- Norbert Brunner (artist) (born 1969), Austrian artist
- Norbert Brunner (bishop) (born 1942), bishop of the Roman Catholic Diocese of Sion
