= Eric Brunner =

Eric Brunner may refer to:

- Eric Brunner (soccer) (born 1986), American soccer player
- Eric Brunner (epidemiologist) (born 1953), British epidemiologist
- Eric Brunner (cyclist) (born 1998), American cyclist
