= John Nelson Pattison =

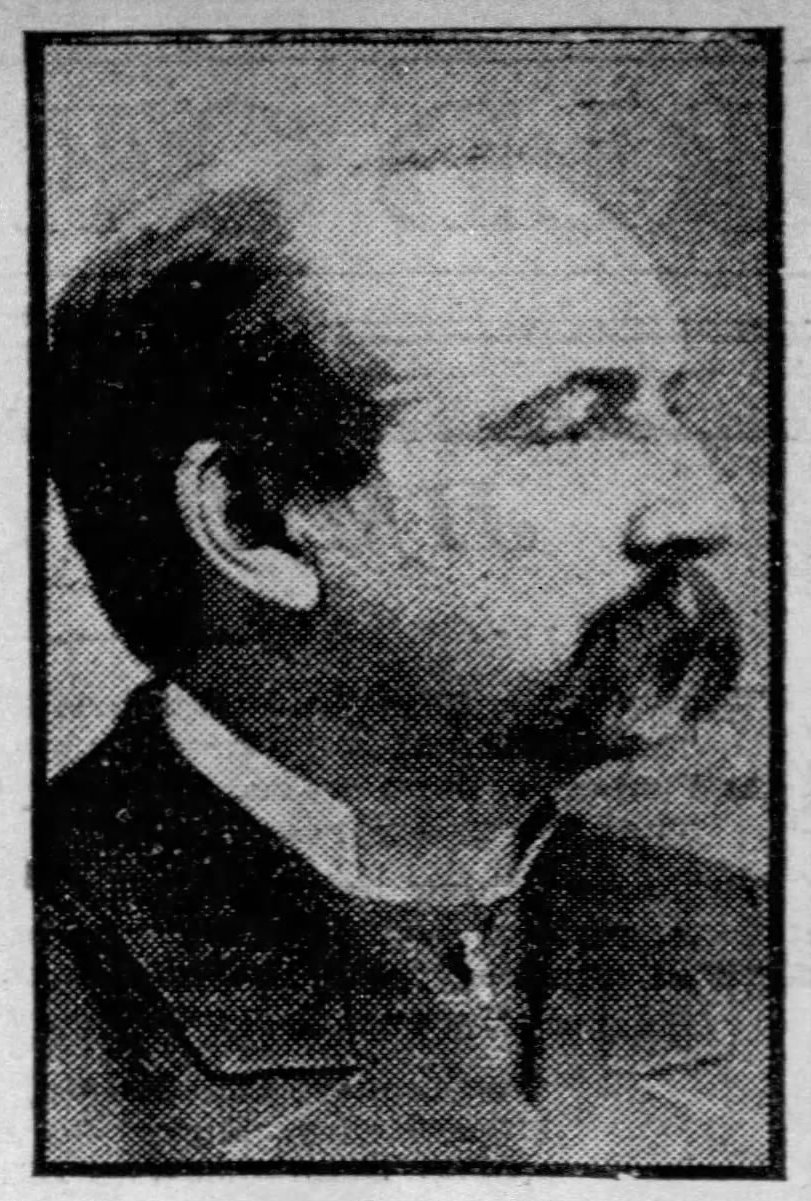
- John Nelson Pattison, portrait published in 1905
- Born: October 22, 1838; Niagara Falls, New York, USA
- Died: July 26, 1905 (aged 66); Harlem, New York, USA
- Occupations: Composer; pianist

John Nelson Pattison (1838–1905) was a concert pianist and composer of popular sheet music in New York and surrounding areas during the late 19th century. His most famous composition was "The Pattison Waltz", a widely performed number in the 1880s which became one of the first pieces of recorded music when Thomas Edison recorded it to a wax cylinder on February 25, 1889. This and two other recordings were deemed so historically important by Edison that he enclosed the cylinders in a glass display case which he exhibited at the Recording Department of his company, Thomas A. Edison, Inc. Today, the cylinders reside in temperature-controlled storage at the Thomas Edison National Historical Park in New Jersey, and the digitized sound file has been placed on the National Recording Registry.

Pattison was born on 22 October 1838, in Niagara Falls, New York, the third of eight children in a Methodist family of Scotch-Irish farmers. He taught himself the piano by practising at a music shop near his school. He moved to Trenton, New Jersey, became a music teacher, and then traveled to Germany with his savings, settling in Berlin to study piano and composition under Franz Liszt and other notable German and English musicians of the mid-19th century. He also did a concert tour of Europe.

Upon his return to the United States, he made a name in New York City as a concert performer, accompanying some of the Prima Donnas of the day such as ”Mme Patti” and Clara Louise Kellogg on their tours, and performing with Parepa-Rosa, and ”Mlle Lucca”.

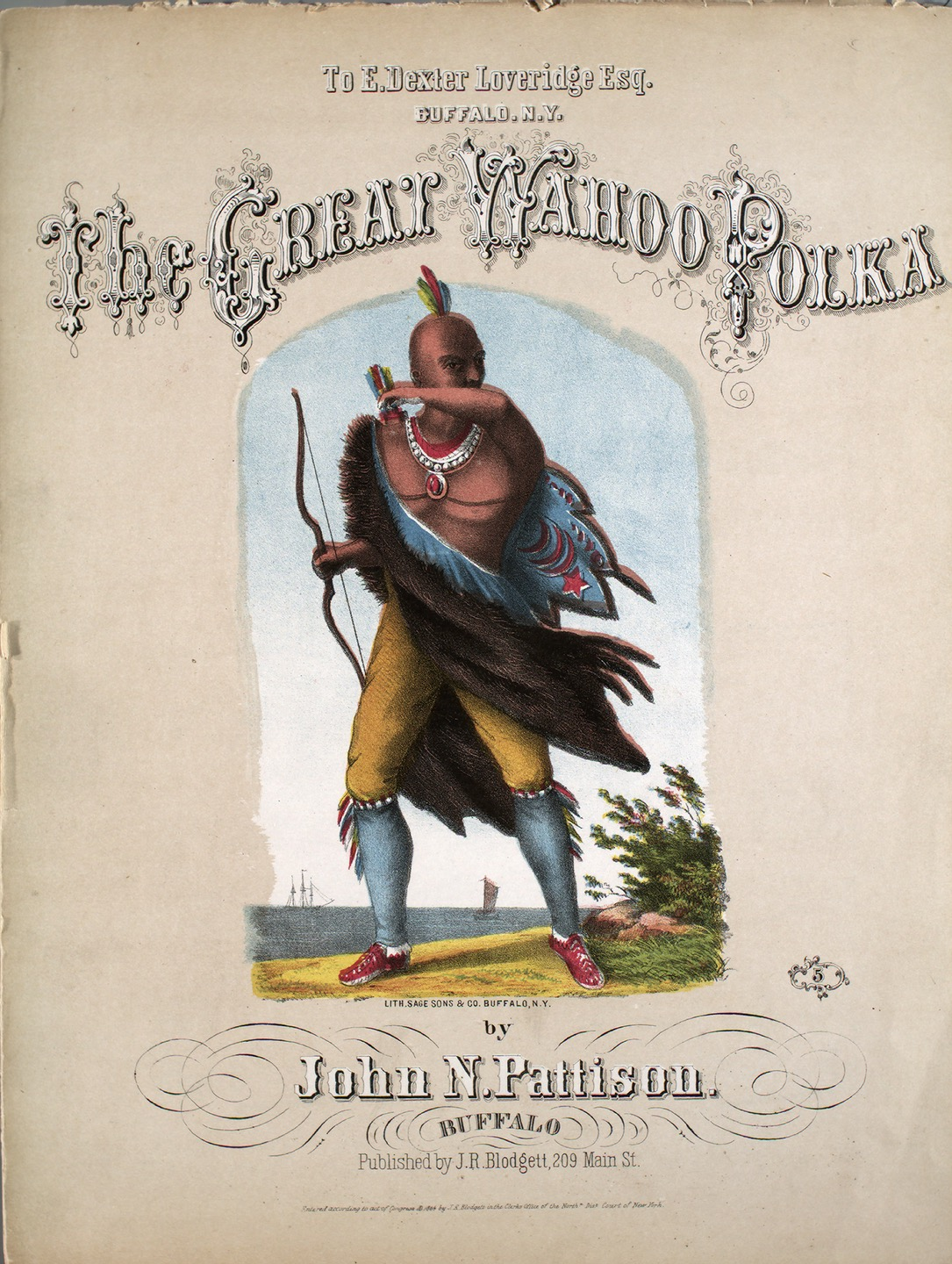
The Great Wahoo Polka (1864).

He was also a prolific composer and publisher of sheet music, with over 200 known compositions to his name. Pattison was one of the only musicians or composers who published their own material during the late 19th century explosion in sheet music sales. His publishing business began in the early 1860s and operated out of a piano and organ salesroom in Union Square in downtown Manhattan, where the Tin Pan Alley publishers would cluster in the 1890s.

Pattison's sheet-music compositions often have a speedy and fantastical quality, and many have French titles, often naïvely rendered. One of his first compositions was "The Great Wahoo Polka", a reel inspired by the patent medicines known as "Wahoo Bitters", one of which was manufactured in his home town of Buffalo. Other compositions were in the softer sentimental style more usually associated with parlour music.

His most ambitious work was “Niagara”, described as a “symphony for orchestra and military band”.

In 1874-76 he gave a series of "musical lectures”, sometimes under the title "Evenings with the Great Musicians", where he introduced the major schools of modern music and performed selections by representative composers such as Handel, Beethoven, Chopin, and himself (!). At some venues he was billed as "Professor Pattison", an early example of the moniker "Professor" being applied to a gifted pianist.

In 1878 he took part in a music therapy experiment, involving the inmates at Blackwell's Island lunatic asylum on Roosevelt Island. Politicians and doctors looked on as he demonstrated that he could soothe a number of different “maniacs” with familiar music from their lands of origin.

He retired from performing and publishing shortly after his third marriage in 1890. He died on July 26, 1905, aged 66, of heat prostration at his home in Harlem, on Lexington Avenue near 113th Street. He is buried in an unmarked grave in his family's plot at Forest Lawn cemetery in Buffalo, NY.

== Personal life ==
After moving to New York City circa 1864, Pattison was married three times. His first marriage in 1868 was to Florence Camp, a 21-year-old contractor's daughter from Erie, Pennsylvania, who left him after a year and returned home. His second marriage, on October 21, 1869, was to Adelaide Mangam, a banker's daughter who grew up on Fifth Avenue. There was a lot of drama between them, and their second child died in infancy, after being kidnapped along with his two-year-old brother, by Pattison's father-in-law, ostensibly to protect them from Pattison, who they claimed drank a lot. Pattison then sued for habeas corpus to obtain access to the surviving boy. Five years later, Adelaide counter-sued him for bigamy, alleging he had never divorced his first wife.

Two decades years later, in 1890, Pattison was married for a third time, to Emma Roemheld, an opera singer from Chicago, who performed under the stage name Emma Romeldi. She was the daughter of a well-known German pharmacist there.

== See also ==
- National Recording Registry
- Lester S. Levy Collection of Sheet Music
