= Zeh (surname) =

Zeh is a surname. Notable people with the surname include:

- H. Dieter Zeh (1932-2018), German physicist
- Harry Ntimban-Zeh (born 1973), French footballer
- Judy Zeh, American statistician
- Juli Zeh (born 1974), German writer
- Norbert Zeh, Canadian computer scientist
- Ray Zeh (1914–2003), American football player
- Stephen Zeh, American basket weaver
