= Zehe =

Zehe may refer to:

== People ==
- Su Zehe (given name Zehe, surname Su), Chinese memory sport grandmaster

=== People with the surname ===
- Alfred Zehe (born 1939), German physicist convicted of spying for East Germany in the United States
- Florian Zehe, sporting director of soccer club FC Ingolstadt 04, Ingolstadt, Bavaria, Germany
- Matthias Zehe, German politician who stood for election in 2013 in Landshut (electoral district), Bavaria, Germany
- Michael Zehe, German businessman, motorsport driver, and sports team owner; founder of Rowe Mineralölwerk and owner of Rowe Racing and sportscar driver for it.

== Other uses ==
- Zehe Building, Poplar Bluff, Butler County, Missouri, USA; an NRHP-listed commercial building

== See also ==
- Zeh (disambiguation)
