= Fehring =

- Municipality
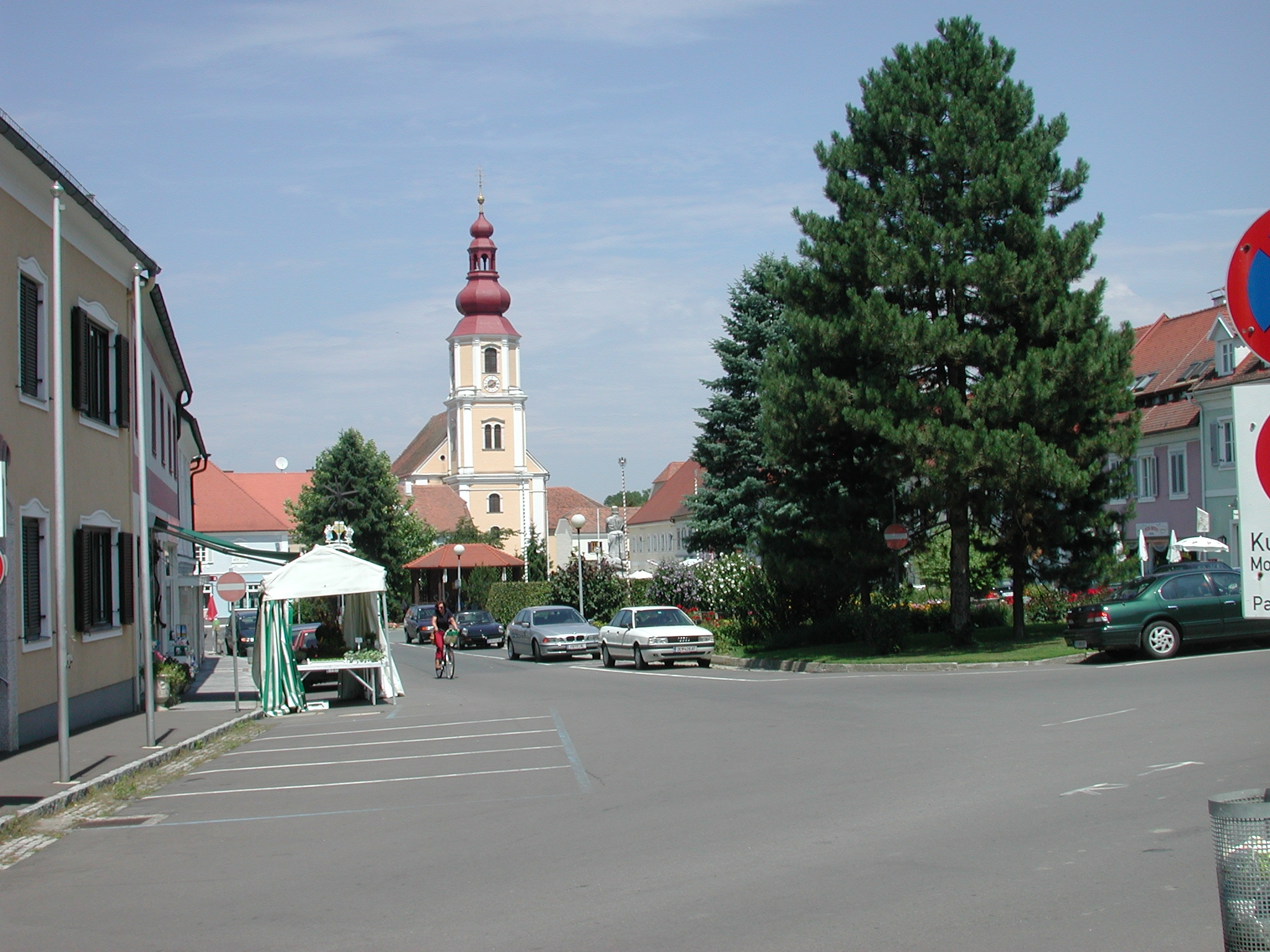

- Coat of arms

- Location within Austria
- Coordinates: 46°56′00″N 16°01′00″E
- Country: Austria
- State: Styria
- District: Südoststeiermark

Government
  - Mayor: Johann Winkelmaier (ÖVP)

Area
  - Total: 87.08 km^{2} (33.62 sq mi)
- Elevation: 272 m (892 ft)

Population (2017-12-31)
  - Total: 7,284
  - Density: 83.65/km^{2} (216.6/sq mi)
- Time zone: UTC+1 (CET)
  - Summer (DST): UTC+2 (CEST)
- Postal code: 8350
- Area code: +43 3155
- Vehicle registration: FB
- Website: www.fehring.at

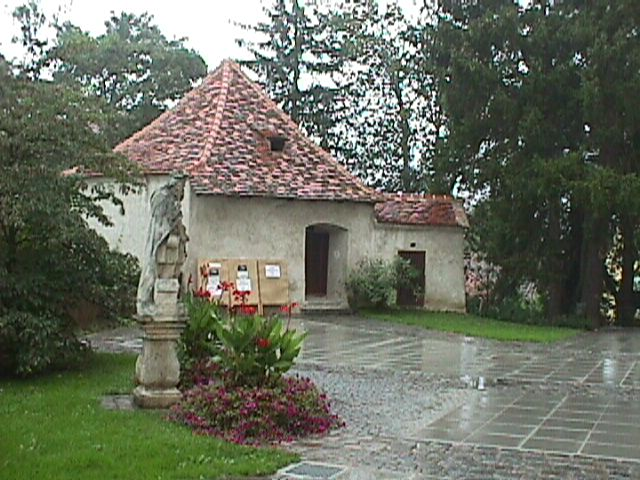
Relic of the Tabor

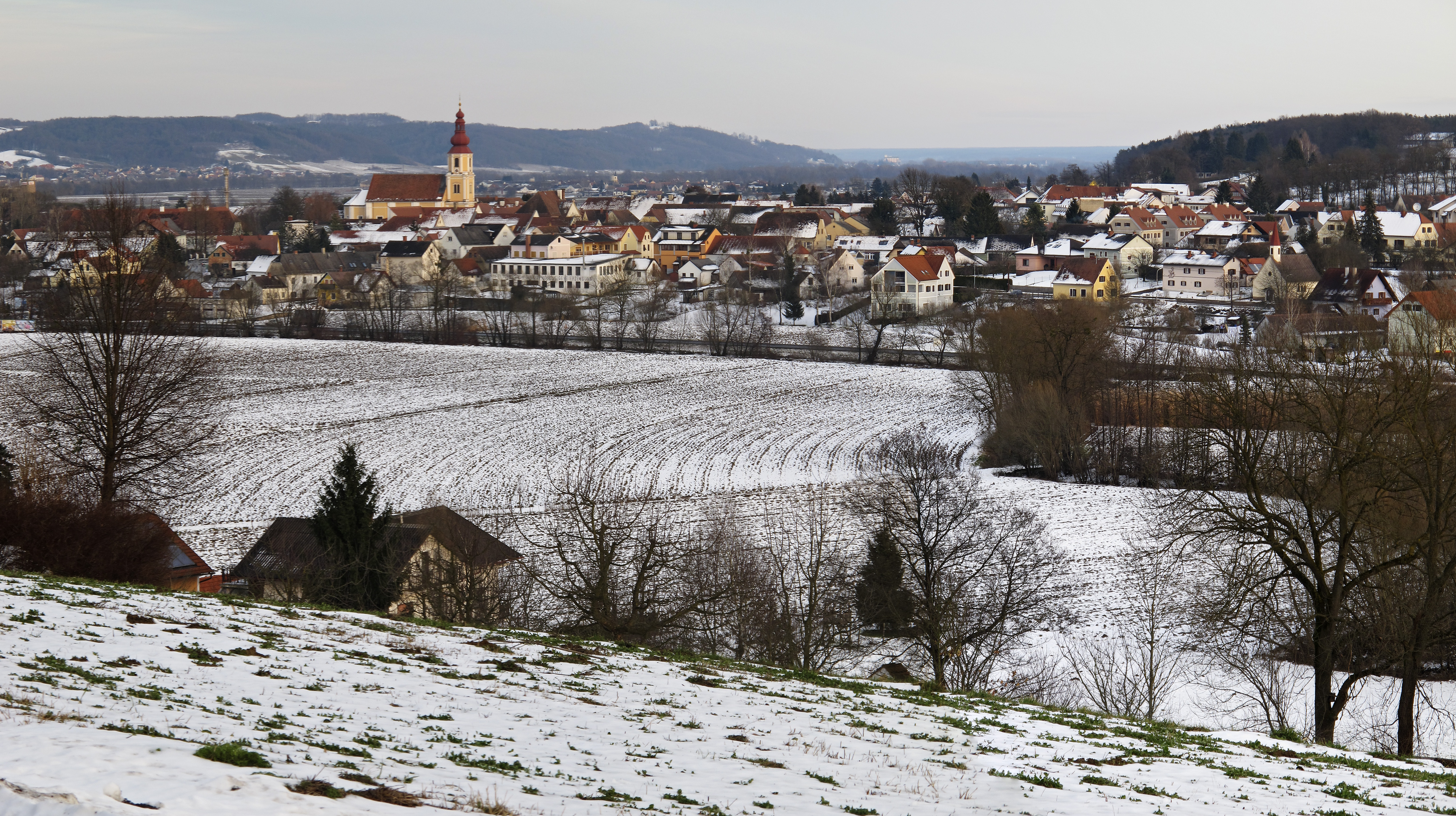
Form south west side

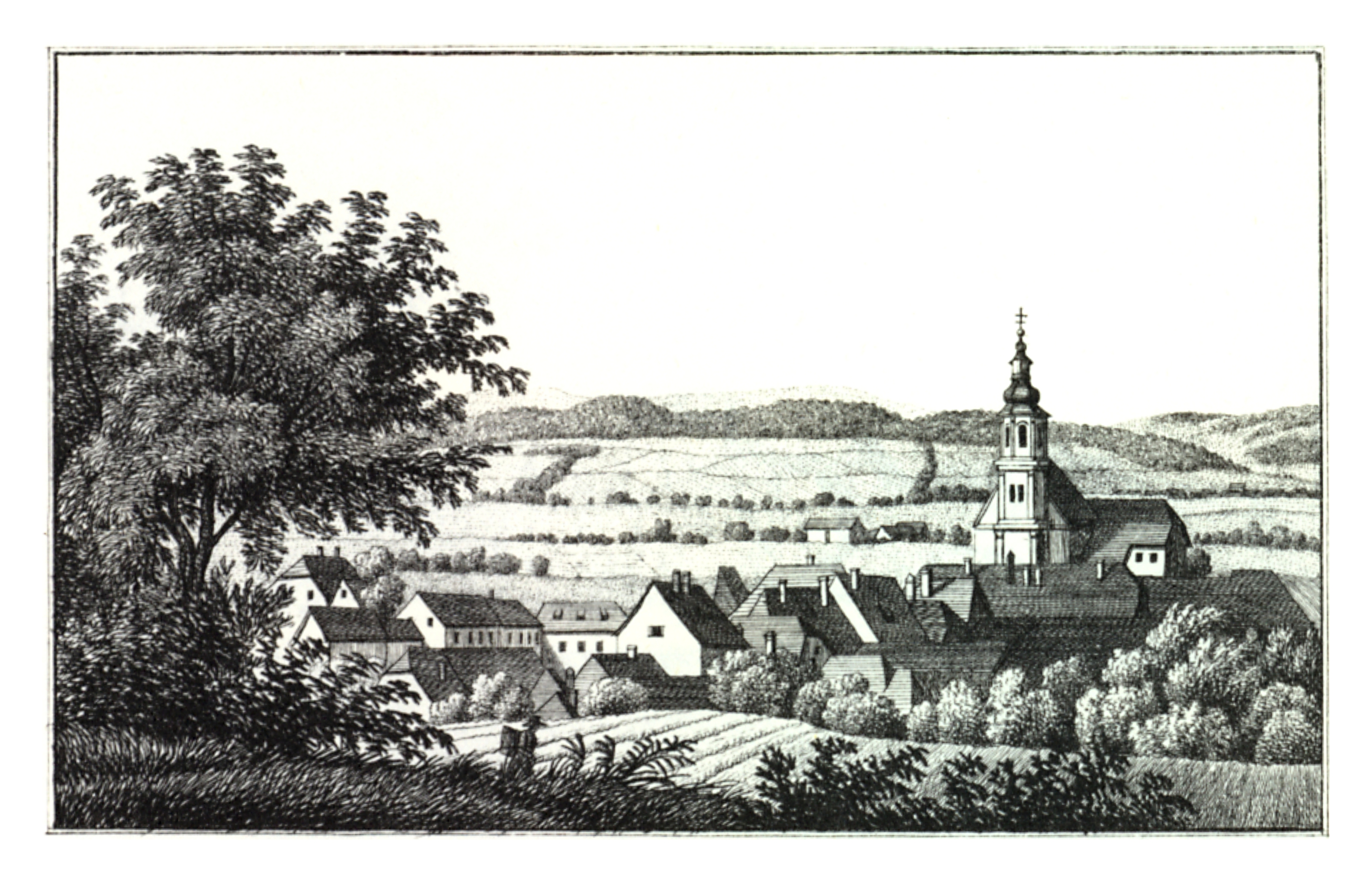
Fehring 1820, Lith. J.F. Kaiser

Fehring is a municipality in the district of Südoststeiermark in Styria, Austria. The landscape is rolling hills cut by the valley of the Raab. Fehring is on a socket some metres above the valley floor. The town is bordered to the east by Burgenland.

== Neighbouring municipalities ==
- In the north: Johnsdorf-Brunn and Hohenbrugg-Weinberg
- In the east: Sankt Martin an der Raab and Mühldorf
- In the south: Kapfenstein
- In the west: Pertlstein

== Community structure ==
The municipality Fehring consists of the villages Hirtzenrigel, Höflach, Petzelsdorf, Petersdorf and Schiefer.

== History ==
The first mention of Fehring is with 40 homesteads in a document from Ottokar of 1265th. The district Petzelsdorf is already mentioned in the Babenberger Urbar 1220th. Fehring was founded as a marketplace and Rudolf IV, Duke of Austria awarded the market law. A parish has been documented in Fehring since 1305.

There have been a lot of wars and fights around Fehring, therefore a tabor was built in the 15th century.

== Transportation ==
Fehring railway station is the terminus for S3 services from Graz on the Steirische Ostbahn.

== Coat of arms ==
King Ferdinand granted arms in Augsburg at 8 July 1550.

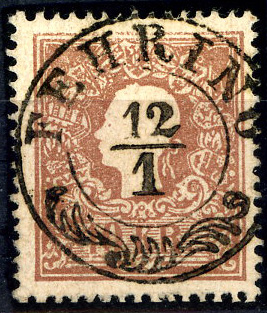
Austrian stamp of 10 kreuzer in 1858

=== Twin towns ===
- (Germany) Heinersreuth
- (Austria) Patsch
