= Nolberto =

Nolberto is a masculine given name. Notable people with the name include:

- Nolberto Herrera (died 2014), Mexican journalist
- Nolberto Molina (born 1953), Colombian footballer and manager
- Nolberto Solano (born 1974), Peruvian footballer and manager

== See also ==
- Norberto
