= Hohenbrugg-Weinberg =

- Former municipality
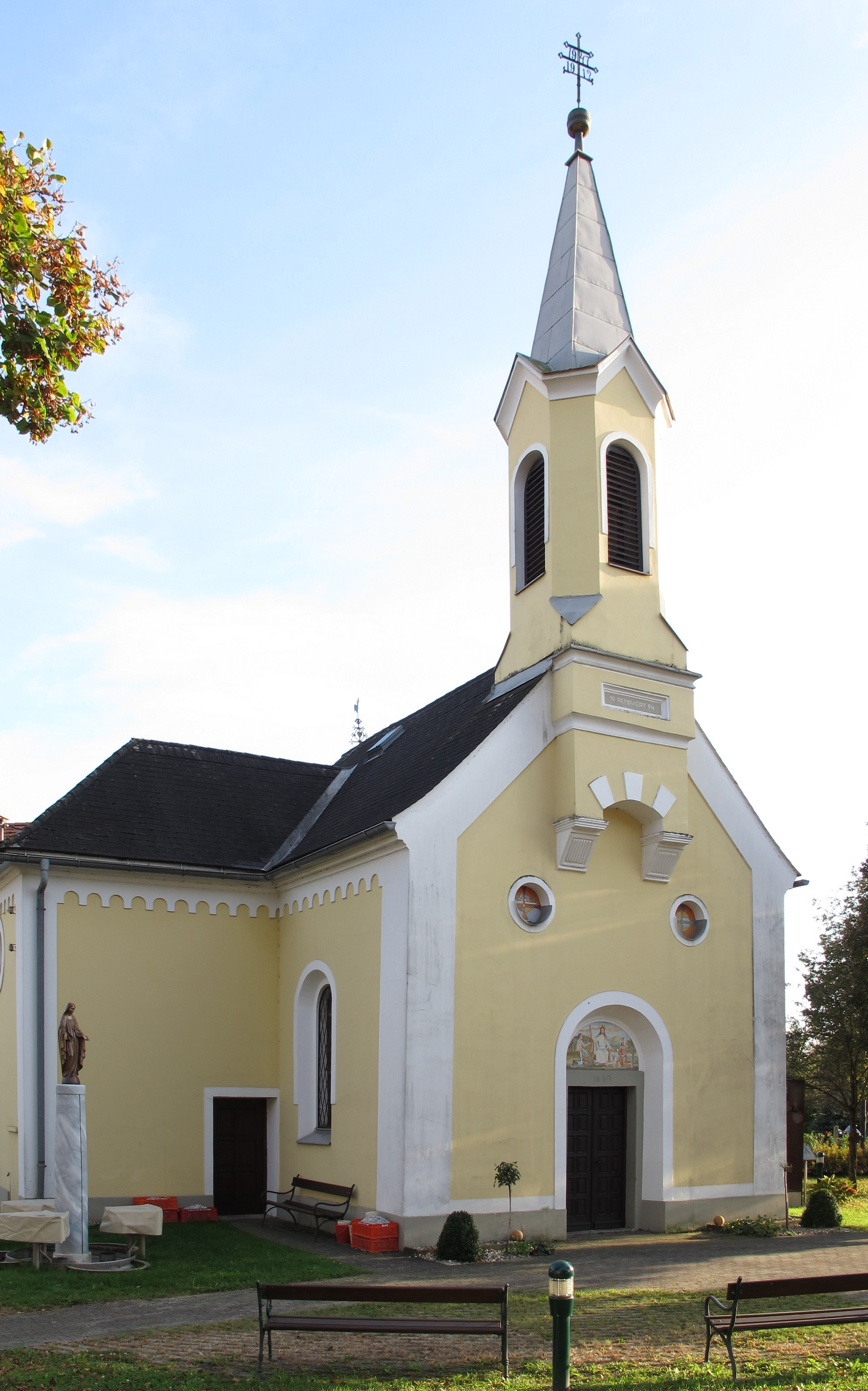
- Chapel in Weinberg

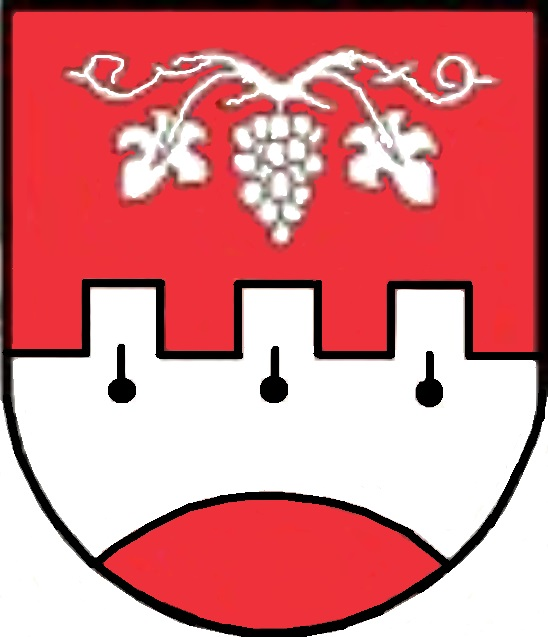
- Coat of arms

- Location within Austria
- Coordinates: 46°57′00″N 16°04′00″E
- Country: Austria
- State: Styria
- District: Südoststeiermark

Area
  - Total: 15.59 km^{2} (6.02 sq mi)
- Elevation: 257 m (843 ft)

Population (1 January 2016)
  - Total: 973
  - Density: 62.4/km^{2} (162/sq mi)
- Time zone: UTC+1 (CET)
  - Summer (DST): UTC+2 (CEST)
- Postal code: 8350, 8352
- Area code: +43 3155
- Vehicle registration: FB
- Website: www.hohenbrugg-weinberg. steiermark.at

Hohenbrugg-Weinberg is a former municipality in the district of Südoststeiermark in the Austrian state of Styria. Since the 2015 Styria municipal structural reform, it has been part of the municipality of Fehring.

== Population ==
Historical population
Year	Pop.	±%
1869	1,271	—
1880	1,352	+6.4%
1890	1,439	+6.4%
1900	1,428	−0.8%
1910	1,428	+0.0%
1923	1,359	−4.8%
1934	1,384	+1.8%
1939	1,295	−6.4%
1951	1,283	−0.9%
1961	1,177	−8.3%
1971	1,200	+2.0%
1981	1,108	−7.7%
1991	1,044	−5.8%
2001	1,087	+4.1%
2013	984	−9.5%
