= Pattison Waltz =

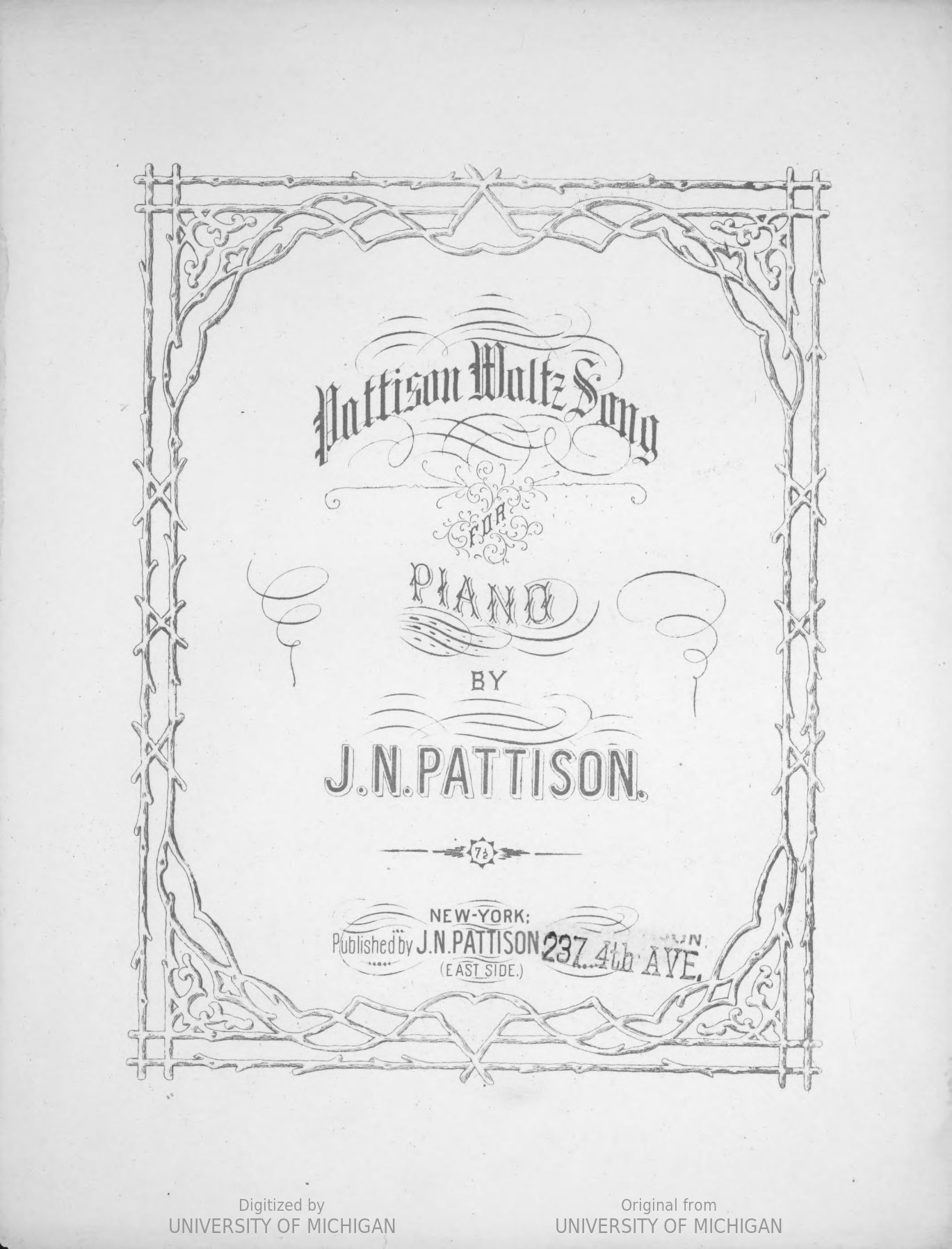
"The Pattison Waltz" (1879 setting for solo piano)

The Pattison Waltz was a dance piece by the pianist and composer J.N. Pattison, published in 1877. It was popular in the 1880s and was selected by Thomas Edison as one of the first musical pieces to be recorded on his new wax phonograph cylinders, on February 25, 1889.

This and two other recordings were deemed so historically important by Edison that he enclosed the cylinders in a glass display case which he exhibited at the Recording Department of his company, Thomas A. Edison, Inc. Today, the cylinders are known as the "exhibition recordings". They reside in temperature-controlled storage at the Thomas Edison National Historical Park in New Jersey, and the digitized sound file has been placed on the National Recording Registry.
