= Brunning =

Brunning is a surname. Notable people with the surname include:

- Bob Brunning (1943–2011), British musician
- Herb Brunning (1886–1947), Australian rules footballer
- Herbie Brunning (1899–1969), Australian rules footballer
- John Brunning (born 1954), English musician
- Nancy Brunning (1971–2019), actress and director
- Noel Brunning, Australian television presenter

== See also ==
- Bruning (disambiguation)
