= Norberto =

Norberto is the Spanish, Portuguese and Italian form of the masculine given name Norbert. Notable people with the name include:

- Norberto Alonso (born 1953), former Argentine football midfielder
- Norberto Araujo (born 1978), Argentine football central defender
- Norberto Aroldi (1932–1978), Argentine film actor and screenwriter
- Norberto Barba (born 1963), American cinematographer and film director
- Norberto Bobbio (1909–2004), Italian philosopher of law and political sciences and a historian of political thought
- Norberto Bocchi (born 1961), Italian bridge player
- Norberto Bravo (born 1970), professional boxer
- Norberto Ceresole (1943–2003), Argentine sociologist and political scientist
- Norberto Collado Abreu (1921–2008), the Cuban captain of the yacht which ferried Fidel Castro and 81 supporters to Cuba from Mexico in 1956
- Norberto Costa Alegre (born 1951), former prime minister of São Tomé and Príncipe
- Norberto Doroteo Méndez (1923–1998), former Argentine football striker
- Norberto Esbrez (born 1966), Argentinian tango dancer, choreographer, and teacher
- Norberto Fontana (born 1975), Argentine racing driver
- Norberto Fuentes (born 1943), writer and journalist
- Norberto Garrido (born 1972), former American football offensive lineman
- Norberto González (born 1979), left-handed pitcher for the Cuban national baseball team
- Norberto Höfling (1924–2005), Romanian footballer and coach
- Norberto Huezo (born 1956), former soccer player from El Salvador
- Norberto Lemos (born 1964), Brazilian footballer and coach
- Norberto Doroteo Méndez (1923–1998), former Argentine football striker
- Norberto Martin (born 1966), former Major League Baseball second baseman
- Norberto Massoni (1935–2010), Argentine Radical Civic Union politician
- Norberto Mulenessa Maurito (born 1981), Angolan football forward
- Norberto Oberburger (born 1960), Italian weightlifter
- Norberto Odebrecht (1920–2014), founded the Odebrecht Foundation in 1965
- Norberto Paparatto (born 1984), Argentine footballer
- Norberto Peluffo (born 1958), former Colombian football player and manager
- Norberto Piñero (1858–1938), Argentine lawyer, writer and conservative politician
- Norberto Raffo (1939–2008), Argentine football striker
- Norberto Ramírez (died 1856), Nicaraguan lawyer and politician
- Norberto Rivera Carrera (born 1942), Mexican Cardinal of the Roman Catholic Church
- Norberto Romuáldez (1875–1941), Philippine writer, politician, jurist and statesman
- Norberto Scoponi, former Argentine football goalkeeper
- Norberto Téllez (born 1972), retired Cuban runner
- Norberto Yácono (1919–1985), Argentine football defender

== Buildings ==
- Convento de San Norberto (Madrid)
- Nolberto
