= Pauline Lucca =

Austrian opera singer (1841–1908)

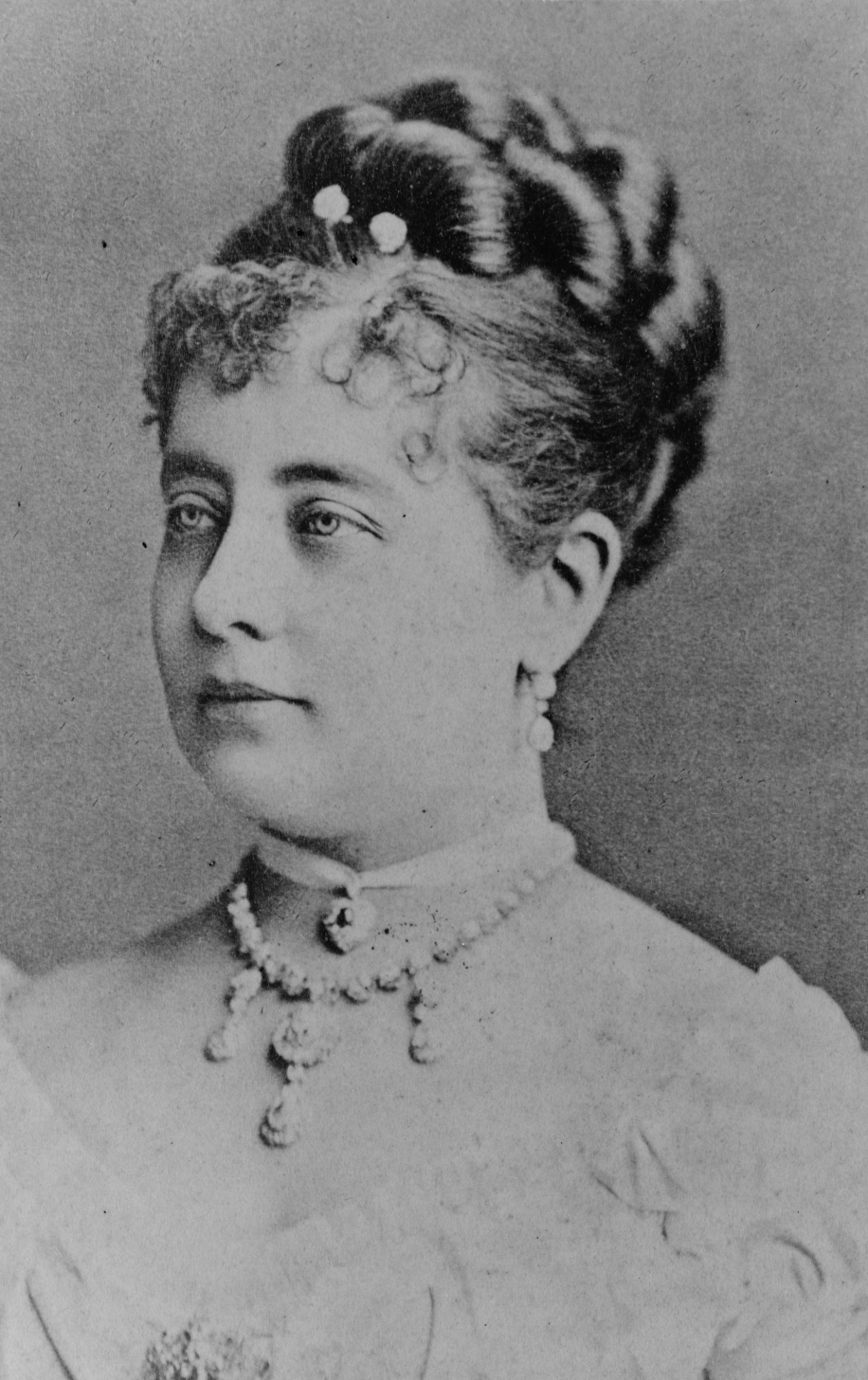
Pauline Lucca

Pauline Lucca (25 April 1841 – 28 February 1908), married Maria Pauline von Wallhoffen, was an Austrian operatic dramatic soprano.

Born in Vienna, she showed a remarkable talent for singing from childhood and at eight years old became a voice student of M. Walter. Not long after, her parents lost all their property, forcing her to abandon her studies. She continued her education as a young teenager with Otto Uschmann and Richard Lewy in Vienna, but was too poor to continue her studies and so joined the chorus of the Vienna State Opera in 1856.

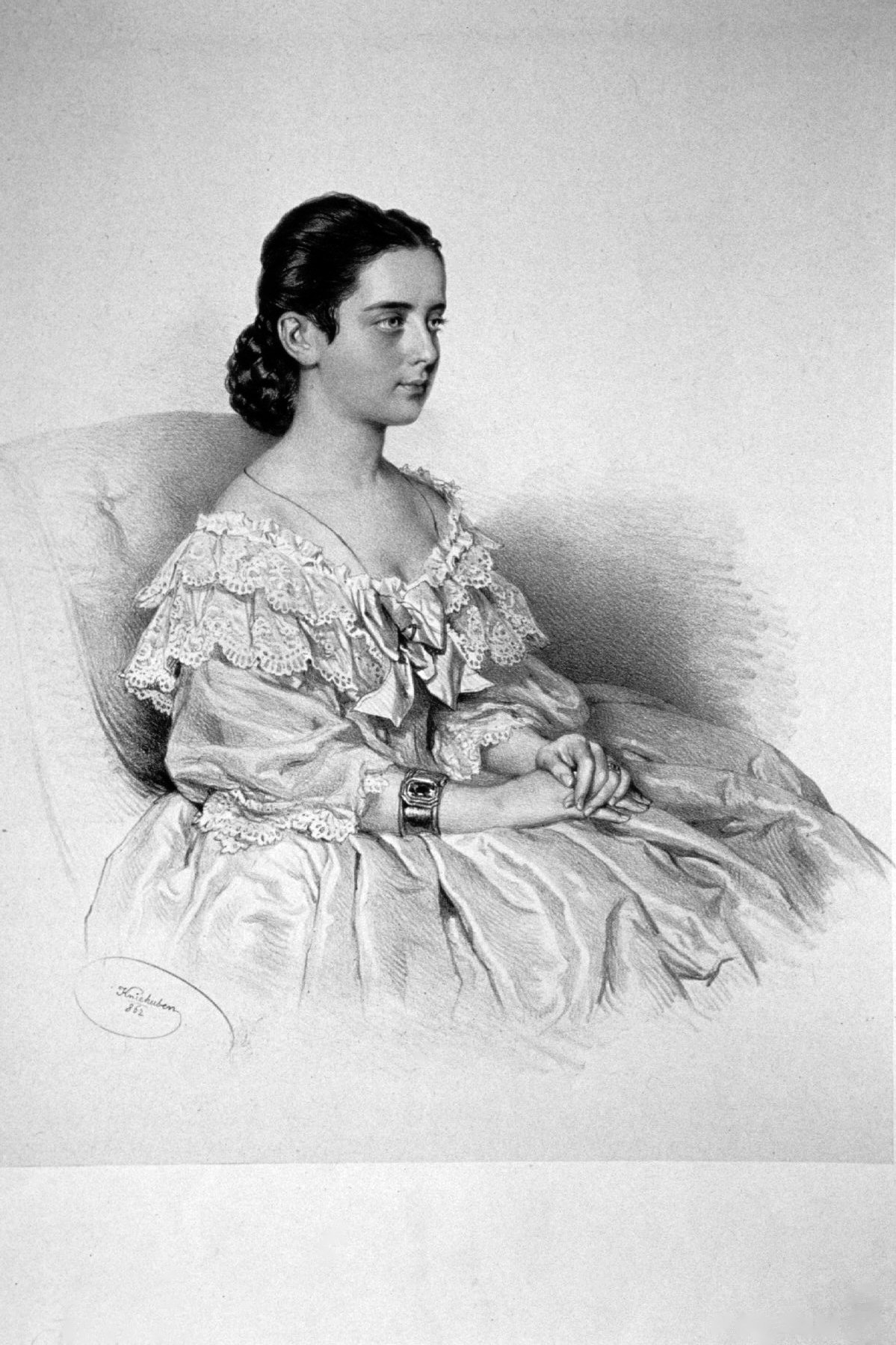
Pauline Lucca, lithography by Josef Kriehuber, 1862

In 1859, she made her début at Olmütz as Elvira in Ernani. She then sang for a while in Prague and in 1861, having attracted the attention of Giacomo Meyerbeer, obtained an engagement at the Berlin State Opera, where her success was absolute for years. In 1863 Lucca made her first appearance in England, which country, as well as France and Russia, she subsequently visited often. Meyerbeer and Daniel Auber considered her unequalled, and the latter was so struck by her interpretation of the part of Zerlina in Fra Diavolo that he gave her the pen with which he had written the opera.

Lucca had a notorious rivalry with soprano Mathilde Mallinger while in Berlin. The conflict between the two extended among their fans as well, with supporters of Mallinger and supporters of Lucca heckling one another. The tension came to a climax on 27 January 1872 in a performance of Mozart's The Marriage of Figaro in which Mallinger sang the Countess and Lucca portrayed Cherubino. During the performance, supporters of Mallinger booed Lucca so severely that she was prevented from singing her aria. So upset by this event, Lucca broke her contract with the opera house and left the German capital to tour the United States for two years where she was received enthusiastically, especially in New York City. John Nelson Pattison accompanied her occasionally in concerts. Lucca spent the summer of 1872 in Kingston, Rhode Island. While in the United States she divorced the Prussian Baron Adolf von Rhaden, whom she had married in 1865. She married the Baron von Wallhoffen on 12 June 1873. From 1874 to 1889, she was a member of the Vienna State Opera. She died on 28 February 1908.
