= Bruning =

Bruning or Brüning may refer to:

- Bruning (surname)
- Bruning Army Airfield, a former airfield
- Brüning Museum, a Peruvian museum
- Bruning, Nebraska

== See also ==
- Brunning
- Citizens for Equal Protection v. Bruning
