= Herb Brunning =

Australian rules footballer

Personal information
- Full name: Leslie Herbert Ashley Brunning
- Born: 26 May 1886; St Kilda, Victoria
- Died: 12 December 1947 (aged 61); Parkville, Victoria
- Original team: Windsor Juniors

Playing career^{1}
Years	Club	Games (Goals)
1902	St Kilda	1 (0)
- ^{1} Playing statistics correct to the end of 1902.

Leslie Herbert Ashley Brunning (26 May 1886 – 12 December 1947) was an Australian rules footballer who played with St Kilda in the Victorian Football League (VFL).
