= Norbert Lossau =

German librarian (born 1962)

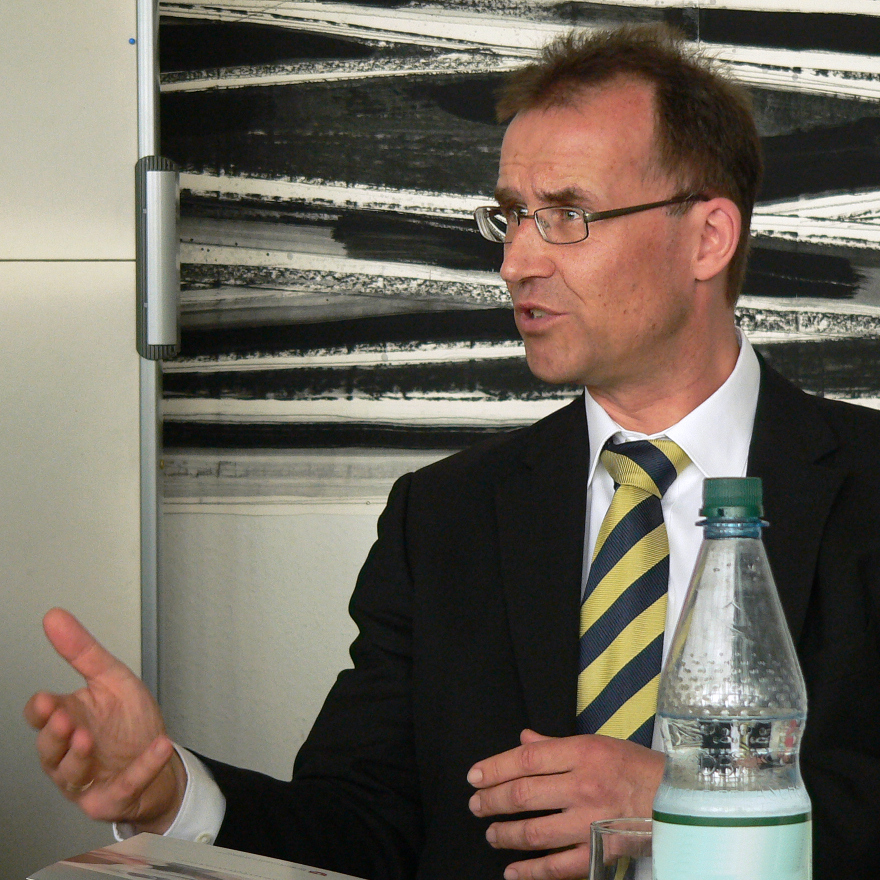
- Born: 20 June 1962 (age 64)
- Education: University of Bonn; University of Göttingen
- Occupation: Librarian

Norbert Lossau (born 20 June 1962) is a German librarian. He has been the Director of the Göttingen State and University Library in Göttingen from 2006 to 2013. Since 2013 he is Vice President of the University of Göttingen.

Lossau studied the Finnish language and Scandinavian studies at the Universities of Bonn and Göttingen, where he graduated in 1988 with a Master's degree. He wrote a PhD thesis on the German Petőfi translations. After three years working as a research associate at the Finnish-Ugrish Department, University of Göttingen, Lossau graduated in 1996 and received the clerkship for the senior library service. He then worked for the preparatory phase of the DFG-project retrospective digitization of library collections and in 1997 took over construction and management of the Göttinger Digitalisierungszentrum. In 1998, he was also technical advisor for the special collections Hungary, Finland and Finnish-Ugrish. In the summer of 2001 Lossau moved to Oxford University, where he became the first director of the Oxford Digital Library. In August 2002, he returned as director of the Bielefeld University Library in Germany. On 1 October 2006 he became head of the Göttingen State and University Library.

== Bibliography ==
- Jahrbuch der Deutschen Bibliotheken. Band 62, 2007/2008. Harrassowitz, Wiesbaden 2007, ISBN 978-3-447-05526-0, S. 474.
