= Norbert Tyrajski =

Polish footballer

Personal information
- Date of birth: 24 May 1975 (age 51)
- Place of birth: Pyrzyce, Poland
- Height: 1.91 m (6 ft 3 in)
- Position: Goalkeeper

Senior career*
Years	Team	Apps	(Gls)
- Sokół Pyrzyce
- Błękitni Stargard Szczeciński
1997–1998	Stal Szczecin		
1998	Odra Szczecin		
1999	Petrochemia Płock		
1999	Odra Szczecin		
2000–2003	Lech Poznań	35	(0)
2004	Widzew Łódź	12	(0)
2005	Warta Poznań		
2005–2006	Diagóras	33	(0)
2007	Warta Poznań	5	(0)
2008–2009	Thiva		
2013	Canarinhos Skórzewo		
2019	Lech Poznań (oldboys)		

Managerial career
- Warta Śrem (goalkeeping coach)
- * Club domestic league appearances and goals

Norbert Tyrajski (born 24 May 1975) is a Polish former professional footballer who played as a goalkeeper, most well known for his appearances for Lech Poznań with whom he won the Polish Cup in 2004.

== Honours ==
Lech Poznań

- I liga: 2001–02
- Polish Cup: 2003–04
