= St. Norbert (disambiguation) =

St. Norbert refers to Norbert of Xanten, saint and founder of the Norbertine or Premonstratensian order, and may also refer to:

- St. Norbert (electoral district), a former provincial electoral division in the Canadian province of Manitoba, operating as two districts from 1870 to 1874 and as one district from 1874 to 1879 and from 1981 to 2019
- St. Norbert, Winnipeg, the area of Winnipeg in roughly the same area as the above
- Saint-Norbert, Quebec, a parish municipality in Canada
- Saint-Norbert-d'Arthabaska, Quebec, a municipality in Canada
- Saint-Norbert, a community in Weldford, New Brunswick, Canada
- St. Norbert College, a college in Wisconsin, USA
- St. Norbert College (Perth), a secondary school in Perth, Australia
- Convento de San Norberto, a former convent in Madrid
