= Brunn, Sweden =

Brunn
- Location within Stockholm Location within Sweden Location within European Union
- Coordinates: 59°17′N 18°26′E
- Country: Sweden
- Province: Uppland
- County: Stockholm County
- Municipality: Värmdö Municipality

Area
  - Total: 0.96 km^{2} (0.37 sq mi)

Population (31 December 2010)
  - Total: 950
  - Density: 986/km^{2} (2,550/sq mi)
- Time zone: UTC+1 (CET)
  - Summer (DST): UTC+2 (CEST)

Brunn is a locality situated in Värmdö Municipality, Stockholm County, Sweden with 950 inhabitants in 2010.
