= Ernst Brunner =

Swiss photographer (1901-1979)

Ernst Brunner (born December 5, 1901 – June 1, 1979) was a Swiss documentary and ethnographic photographer.

== Early life and career ==
Brunner completed a carpentry apprenticeship in his father's company in Mettmenstetten. From 1918 he went on a walking tour. From 1923 to 1925 he attended the Schreiner-Fachschule in Nuremberg and the class for interior design at the Kunstgewerbeschule Zürich. In 1929 he left the carpentry trade and moved to Lucerne, where after having been influenced by the ideas of the Bauhaus, Brunner worked as an interior designer at Theiler + Helber. During the Depression he lost his job.

== Photographer ==
In 1936 Brunner worked on an inventory of historical monuments in the context of a public employment program for the unemployed. He put to use his skills as a photographer which he had taught himself in the 1920s. By chance he showed his avocational photography to publisher 'Regina Verlag' in Zurich and was soon photographing for the influential national magazines Schweizer Heim and Schweizer Familie from 1936 until the 1950s.

His main subject matter was everyday life in traditional rural Switzerland, focusing particularly on agriculture and craft. Brunner experienced a rapidly changing rural Swiss life and he wanted to preserve this world and the inherited knowledge of farmers who worked hard without mechanical help, with few resources and close to Nature in glorious alpine regions.

Brunner was systematic as a photographer, using the camera to document his subjects objectively. He composed his photos with strong and simple forms, often shooting from above or below his subjects, seeking more effective descriptive visual information. He made photo sequences on the same subject, or to document a work or social process, as he wanted to capture the rural world accurately. Longer sequences of images document workflows and put great emphasis on the involvement of the historical, geographic and social environment, for example, when he photographed craftsmanship. Typically he made between ten and twenty photos, and sometimes as many as one hundred separate images, like frames of an ethnographic film (for example in his series on charcoal burning). These sequences show all the relevant details of a process, while the aesthetic impact of individual photos is of secondary importance.

As an archivist, he kept a careful filing system in which his images were gathered under keywords such as 'work', 'architecture', or 'customs', and within each of these, the subjects were separated geographically.

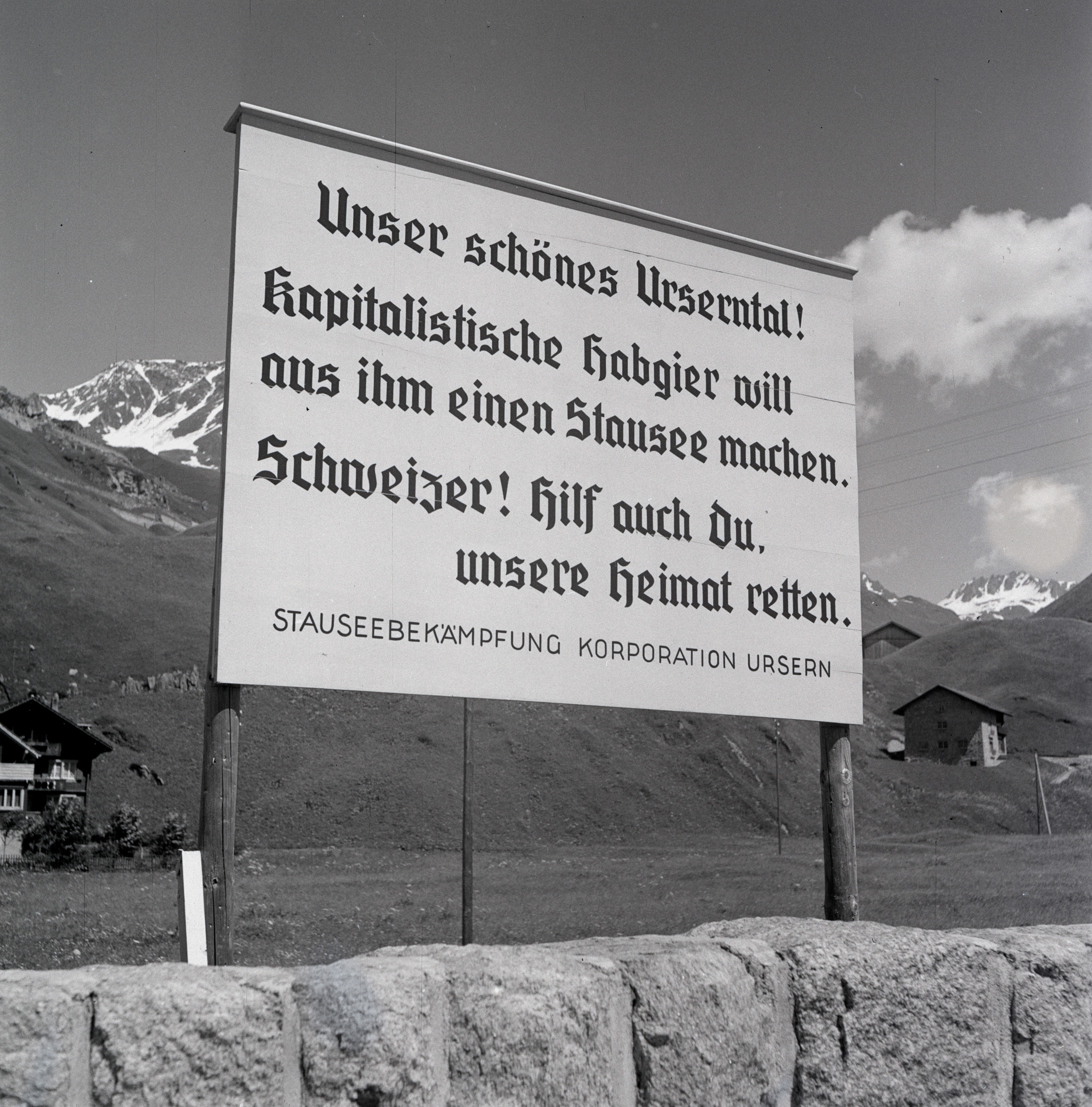
Ernst Brunner (1945-1946) Photograph of sign protesting the construction of an hydroelectric reservoir at Urseren.

Leading up to and during WW2 Das Schweizer Heim used Brunner’s imagery to serve a conservative and nationalist agenda, removing them from the sequences and contexts of his anthropological studies, often by cropping the images, to isolate imagery of the heroic, traditional and quintessentially Swiss, alpine farm worker.

Incidental to his imagery of traditional lifestyles, and as evidence of his own conservationist values, was his deliberate recording of the conflicting reactions to hydroelectric schemes in Switzerland which were to bring cheap electricity, but with the consequence of flooding of pastures and relocation of historic villages and their populations, as well as the industrialisation rural areas.

== International recognition ==
In 1952 Edward Steichen visited Switzerland to collect photographs for the show The Family of Man, and there he was introduced to photographers by Robert Frank. He selected a photograph by Brunner, probably shown to him by Swiss editor Arnold Kübler from Du magazine in which it had been published in a 1950 issue devoted to dance.

The picture Steichen selected was Alpfest im Unterengadin (‘Feast on an alpine pasture in Lower Engadin’), a celebration called 'Masilras', which took place exactly one week after the dairy herds were moved to summer pastures up on the alps. It is a distant, elevated view, over the heads of spectators, of many dancers about join into a ring on the hillside and it was presented by Steichen in a special display of Ring a Ring o' Roses imagery in the exhibition which opened at the Museum of Modern Art, New York, January 24 – May 8, 1955. It then toured the world to be seen by 9 million visitors.

== Later career ==
In 1954 Brunner was initiator and director of the "Vereinigung Luzerner Bauernhausforschung”, for which he was to complete a final documentary work. The project was supported by the Aktion Bauernhaus Forschung the Institute which in 1944 initiated the project "Farmhouse Research in Switzerland", a postwar employment program for unemployed architects and technicians, to document the principal rural buildings of Switzerland using finances provided by the cantons. Comprehensive scientific evaluation was only possible from 1960 when financial support of the Swiss National Foundation for the Promotion of Scientific Research was secured. Brunner was to document all farmhouses in a Swiss district, and his photography for the huge project took twenty years, during which time he was not obliged to publish anything. It was completed only two years before he died in 1979. These photos are straightforward documentation, so his method is still more methodical, and more objective, eschewing the unusual angles of view in the earlier series for an analytic and exact rendering of the traditional buildings.

Brunner also co-founded of the Swiss Agricultural Museum Burgrain in Alberswil.

Before his death in 1979, he bequeathed his archives to the society of Swiss anthropology, where they are still available in his original archival system.

== Exhibitions ==
- Photography in Switzerland - Today. Gewerbemuseum, Basel 1949, group exhibition
- The Family of Man. Museum of Modern Art, New York 1955, group exhibition
- Eitenblicke. Die Schweiz 1848 bis 1998. Forum der Schweizer Geschichte, Schwyz 1998, group exhibition
- Photography in the Emmental. Idyll and reality. Bern Art Museum, Berne 2000

== Publications ==
- 100 Bilder von einem Kohlemeier im Entlebuch, Eigenverlag, Luzern 1940
- Brunner, E., & Vereinigung für Luzernische Bauernhausforschung. (1954). Programm für die Bestandesaufnahme von bäuerlichen Hausformen im Kanton Luzern gemäss [Para] 1 und 2b der Statuten der Vereinigung für Luzernische Bauernhausforschung.
- Die Bauernhäuser im Kanton Luzern, Schweizerische Gesellschaft für Volkskunde, Basel 1977
- Peter Pfrunder, Ernst Brunner. Photographien 1937-1962 (Monograph), Offizin, Zürich 1995.
- Emil Brunner, Bergkinder 1943-1944, Limmat Verlag Zürich 2004

== Bibliography ==
- Bachmann, D. 1996. "Der geduldige Planet. Eine Weltgeschichte," 255 Photographs from the magazine Du. Zurich: Du Verlag.
- Schweitzer Monatsschrift 1941 till today. Zurich: Conzett Huber.
- Das Schweizer Heim 1913-1971, Illustrated magazine, Zurich: Regina.
- Weiss, R. 1946, 1984. Volkskunde der Schweiz.
- Grundriss. Eugen Rentsch Schwabisch Hall: Zurich.
  - 1941. Das Alpewesen Graubündens. Zürich: Erlebach.
