= José Brunner =

- ז'וזה ברונר
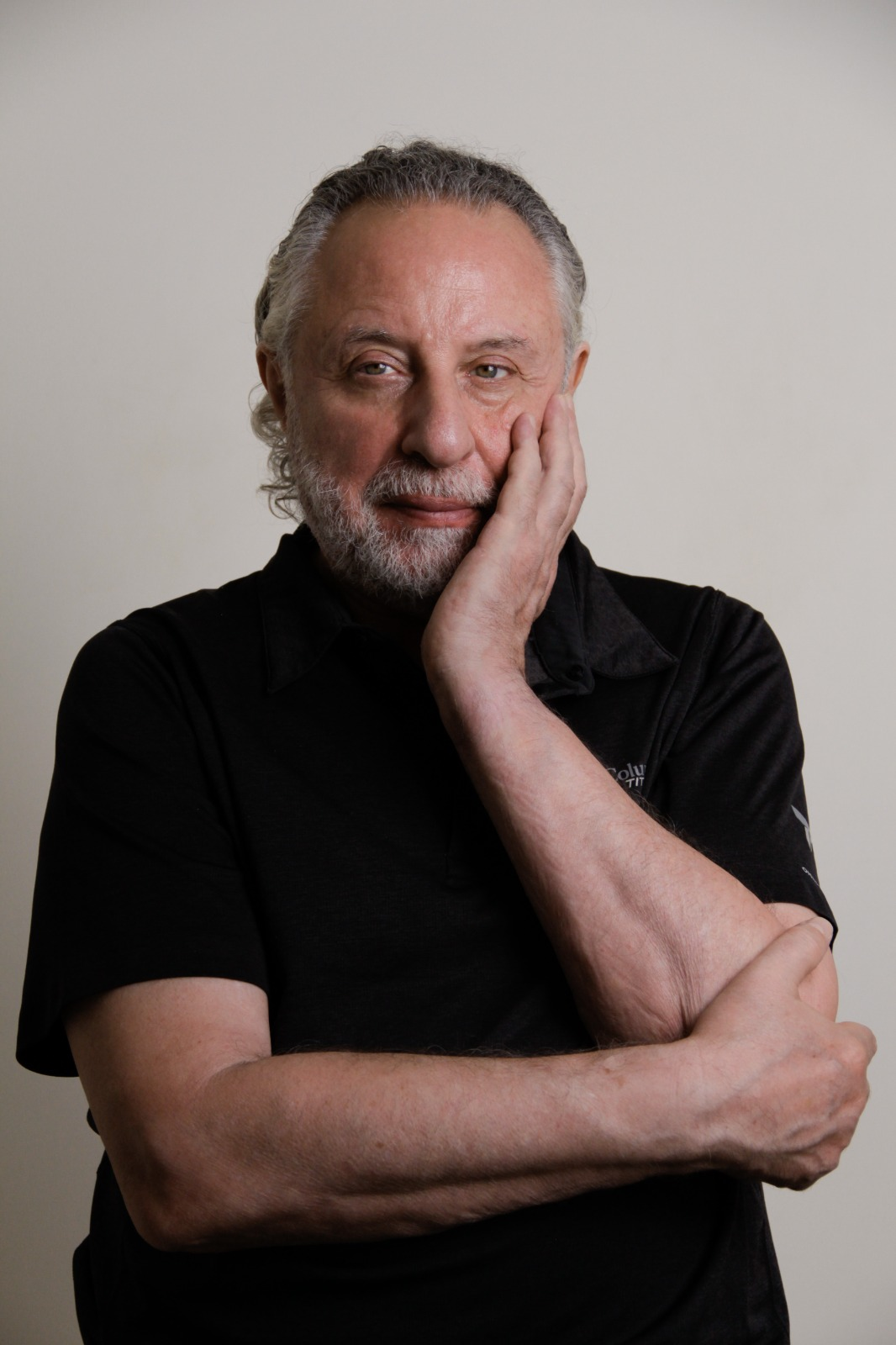
- Born: 1954 (age 71–72); Zurich, Switzerland

Academic background
- Education: Hebrew University of Jerusalem (BA, 1977); University of Oxford (DPhil, 1987)

José Brunner (Hebrew: ז'וזה ברונר; born 1954, in Zurich) is an Israeli historian of science. He is a Professor emeritus at both the Buchmann Faculty of Law and the Cohn Institute for the History and Philosophy of Science and Ideas at Tel Aviv University.

== Early life and education ==
Brunner completed a B.A. in political science at the Hebrew University of Jerusalem in 1977 and a D.Phil. in Politics at St Antony's College, University of Oxford, in 1987.

== Academic career ==
Brunner has held various academic positions and visiting professorships throughout his career. He joined Tel Aviv University as a lecturer in the Department of Political Science in 1988 and later became a senior lecturer and full professor at both the Buchmann Faculty of Law and the Cohn Institute for the History and Philosophy of Science and Ideas. He has been a professor emeritus since 2018.

As a visiting scholar, he conducted research and taught at institutions including the Minda de Gunzburg Center for European Studies at Harvard University, the Department of Social Studies of Medicine at McGill University, the Jena Center for 20th Century History at Friedrich Schiller University Jena, and the Center for the History of Knowledge at ETH Zurich.

Brunner also held several leadership roles, serving as the director of the Minerva Institute for German History at Tel Aviv University from 2005 to 2013, the Eva and Marc Besen Institute for the Study of Historical Consciousness from 2012 to 2018, and the Cohn Institute for the History and Philosophy of Science and Ideas from 2015 to 2018. From 2021 to 2023, he was the academic director of the Wiener Library for the Study of the Nazi Era and the Holocaust. In 2011, he co-founded Israel's first Legal Clinic for the Rights of Holocaust Survivors alongside attorney Yossi Hayut.

== Selected publications ==
=== Books ===
Brunner has authored over 100 scientific publications, which appeared across multiple languages, including English, German, Hebrew, Spanish, Greek, and Japanese. His works comprise three monographs and seventeen edited volumes. Notable publications include:

- Brutale Nachbarn: Wie Emotionen den Nahostkonflikt antreiben – und entschärfen können (2025): Analyzes October 7 and the current Middle East war from psychological perspective, while placing them in the broader context of the Israeli-Palestinian conflict.
- Recht auf Wahrheit: Zur Genese eines neuen Menschenrechts (2016, co-edited with Daniel Stahl): Discusses the emergence of the "right to truth" as a human right.
- Die Politik des Traumas. Gewalterfahrungen und psychisches Leid in den USA, in Deutschland und im Israel/Palästina Konflikt (2014): Examines the emergence and impact of scientific concepts of mental trauma in various historical and geopolitical contexts.
- Die Globalisierung der Wiedergutmachung: Politik, Moral, Moralpolitik (2013, co-edited with Constantin Goschler and Norbert Frei): Shows how large companies, the art trade, legal proceedings, expellee associations as well as historians influenced Holocaust compensation.
- Die Praxis der Wiedergutmachung: Geschichte, Erfahrung und Wirkung in Deutschland und Israel (2009, co-edited with Norbert Frei and Constantin Goschler): Focuses on the tension between the survivors’ expectations of justice and the legal frameworks the developed in the societies in which they received compensation.
- Freud and the Politics of Psychoanalysis (1995; 2nd ed. in 2001, e-book in 2017): Explores the political contents and contexts of Sigmund Freud's psychoanalytic theories. A German translation appeared in 2001.

=== Recent articles ===
- Traumatische Zeiten, traumatisierende Orte – zu den psychischen Belastungen von Geflüchteten und deren Versorgung. In: Ingrid Beckner, Carla Bormann, Philipp Piechura, and Franziska Werner (eds.), Flucht, Raum, Forschung. Eine Einführung zu raumwissenschaftlichen und planungsrelevanten Themen. (Wiesbaden: Springer, 2024), 325-346. Co-authored with Juriy Nesterko and Heide Glaesmer.
- Liminal care: “Old refugees” provide psychological relief for “new refugees”. In: Brian Schiff, Constance Pâris De Bollardière and Sharon Kangisser Cohen (eds.), Overcoming the Darkness? Holocaust Survivors’ Emotional and Social Journeys in the Early Postwar Period. (Jerusalem: Yad Vashem, 2023), 35-67.
- Zur Geopolitik des Traumas. Eine kritische Raumtheorie für die Traumaforschung. Trauma & Gewalt, 15:4, 2021, 276-286.
- Emotionalizing the Israeli-Palestinian conflict: On the civil society engagements of Israeli mental health professionals in response to the Palestinian uprisings. Emotions & Society, 3(1), 2021, 115-132. Co-authored with Galia Plotkin-Amrami.
