= Norbert Misiak =

Polish footballer

Personal information
- Full name: Norbert Misiak
- Date of birth: 25 June 1994 (age 32)
- Place of birth: Warsaw, Poland
- Height: 1.82 m (6 ft 0 in)
- Position: Right midfielder

Youth career
- 2002–2013: Legia Warsaw

Senior career*
Years	Team	Apps	(Gls)
2013–2015	Legia Warsaw II	48	(12)
2015	Legia Warsaw	1	(0)
2015–2016	GKS Bełchatów	0	(0)
2016–2017	Raków Częstochowa	0	(0)
Total		49	(12)
- * Club domestic league appearances and goals

Norbert Misiak (born 25 June 1994) is a Polish former professional footballer who played as a right midfielder.

In July 2015, he signed a three-year deal with GKS Bełchatów.

He retired from football in 2017 at the age of 23, after suffering his fourth knee ligament rupture.
