= Johnsdorf-Brunn =

- Former municipality
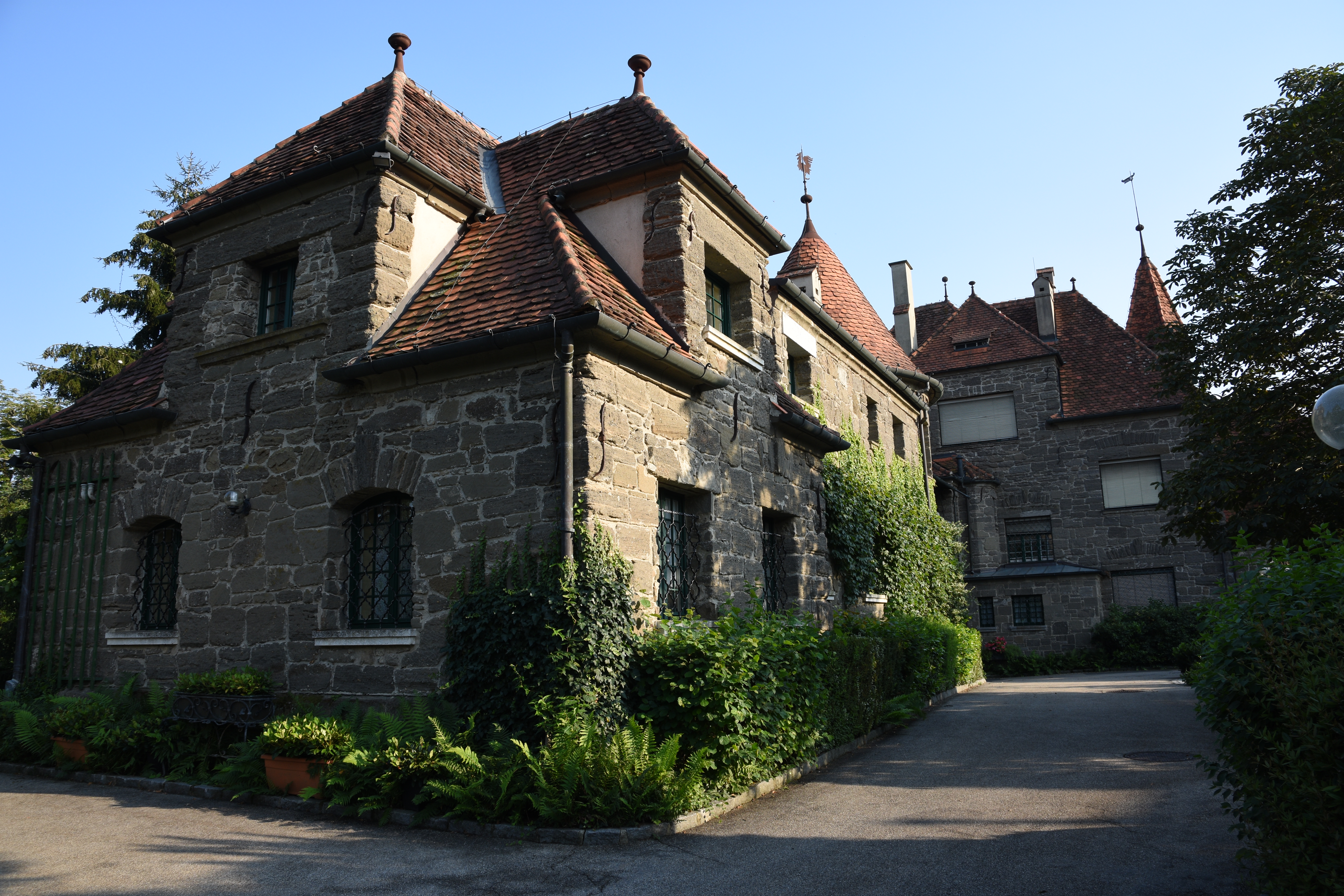
- Hantberg Castle in Johnsdorf

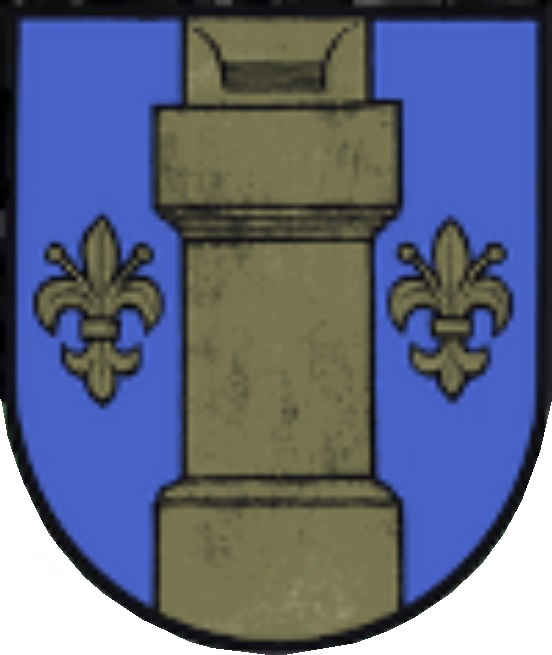
- Coat of arms

- Location within Austria
- Coordinates: 46°57′00″N 15°59′00″E
- Country: Austria
- State: Styria
- District: Südoststeiermark

Area
  - Total: 7.34 km^{2} (2.83 sq mi)
- Elevation: 270 m (890 ft)

Population (1 January 2016)
  - Total: 782
  - Density: 107/km^{2} (276/sq mi)
- Time zone: UTC+1 (CET)
  - Summer (DST): UTC+2 (CEST)
- Postal code: 8350
- Area code: +43 3155
- Vehicle registration: FB
- Website: www.johnsdorf-brunn.at

Johnsdorf-Brunn is a former municipality in the district of Südoststeiermark in Austrian state of Styria. Since the 2015 Styria municipal structural reform, it is part of the municipality Fehring.

== Population ==
Historical population
Year	Pop.	±%
1869	524	—
1880	543	+3.6%
1890	587	+8.1%
1900	661	+12.6%
1910	700	+5.9%
1923	739	+5.6%
1934	684	−7.4%
1939	680	−0.6%
1951	648	−4.7%
1961	678	+4.6%
1971	753	+11.1%
1981	803	+6.6%
1991	777	−3.2%
2001	750	−3.5%
2013	798	+6.4%
