= Meta Brunner =

Swiss liaison to Indian anti-colonialists (1886–1971)

- Born: 1 January 1886; Zurich, Switzerland
- Died: 24 January 1971 (aged 85); Zollikon, Switzerland
- Other name: Meta Maares-Brunner
- Occupations: Domestic helper; language teacher; correspondent
- Known for: Internment in England as a liaison to Indian anti-colonialists, 1915–1919
- Spouse: Carl Friedrich Maares (m. 1922; died 1943)

Meta Brunner, after her marriage Meta Maares-Brunner (1 January 1886 – 24 January 1971), was a Swiss woman who acted as a liaison for Indian anti-colonialists during World War I, for which she was interned without trial in England for four years. She became a German citizen on her marriage in 1922 and regained Swiss citizenship in 1953.

== Early life ==
Meta Brunner was one of ten children of Adolf Brunner, a pharmacist, and Luise née Mutter, and grew up in Zurich. Her brother Otto Brunner owned the Paradiesvogel pharmacy, was a colonel, and sat in the Grosser Stadtrat, Zurich's city parliament. Her sister Marie Brunner performed as an actress in England and the United States under the stage name Blanche LeRoy. As a young adult, Meta Brunner worked as a Haustochter (a live-in domestic helper) and later as a language teacher in France, England, Italy, and Germany.

== Internment in England ==
Virendranath Chattopadhyaya, whose letters Brunner smuggled into England

During World War I, Brunner was in contact with the Indian anti-colonial resistance movement; for lack of sources, her motives are not known. On 19 July 1915 she was arrested in England for smuggling into the country letters from the Indian anti-colonialist Virendranath Chattopadhyaya, who was working for the German authorities. Without trial, she was interned under the provisions of martial law at Aylesbury Prison in Buckinghamshire, together with two Englishwomen, Hilda Howsin and Mary Elgie. Elgie had until shortly before lived in Zurich as the partner of the Indian revolutionary Abdul Hafiz. The British authorities hoped in this way to cut off communication between Chattopadhyaya and his possible helpers in Britain.

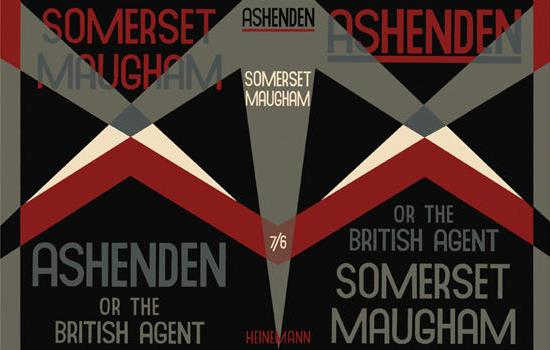
First edition of Maugham's Ashenden (1928), which contains the story "Giulia Lazzari"

In the spring and summer of 1915 Chattopadhyaya and Hafiz planned assassinations, among them that of the British Secretary of State for War, Lord Kitchener. At the same time, acting for the German General Staff, the two men supplied explosives to Italian anarchists in Zurich for covert wartime operations in Italy. For this the Swiss federal criminal court convicted them in absentia in 1919, in what became known as the Zurich bomb trial (Zürcher Bombenprozess). In the fall of 1915 the British authorities coerced Brunner into trying to lure Chattopadhyaya to France, within reach of the British police. The attempt failed, but it found its way into literature in "Giulia Lazzari" (1928), a short story by the British writer and intelligence agent W. Somerset Maugham, published in Ashenden: Or the British Agent.

Her family wrote extensively to the Federal Political Department in Bern and the Swiss legation in London, and both made diplomatic representations, but the efforts to have Brunner released failed. An intervention in the British Parliament on behalf of Howsin and Brunner in November 1916 was equally unsuccessful. Only after the Treaty of Versailles was Brunner deported to the Netherlands, on 5 July 1919, from where she was able to travel to Switzerland with a Red Cross refugee passport. No further involvement by Brunner in the cause of Indian independence is known.

== Later life ==
In 1922 Brunner asked the Swiss authorities, without success, for compensation for the harm she had suffered during her internment. The same year she married Carl Friedrich Maares, a German engineer and businessman from Kassel, and as a result lost her Swiss citizenship. The couple had no children. They lived first in Emmerich am Rhein and from 1929 in Amsterdam, where Maares died in 1943 while performing forced labor imposed by the German occupiers. Under new federal legislation, Meta Maares-Brunner regained Swiss citizenship in 1953.

The Swiss Federal Archives hold a file on Maares-Brunner covering the years 1958 to 1960. She applied to the Commission for Advance Payments to Swiss Victims of National Socialist Persecution (Kommission für Vorauszahlungen an schweizerische Opfer der nationalsozialistischen Verfolgung), which rejected her claim on the grounds that it had not been proven that her husband's death resulted from persecution. Because of the damage to her old-age provision caused by her husband's death, the Commission for Aid to Swiss Abroad Harmed by the War (Kommission für die Hilfe an kriegsgeschädigte Auslandschweizer) nevertheless granted her a monthly pension as a hardship case. In January 1959 Meta Maares-Brunner returned to Switzerland and worked as a correspondent in Zurich. She died in Zollikon in 1971.

== Bibliography ==
- J. C. Ker, Political Trouble in India 1907–1917, 1917
- W. S. Maugham, "Giulia Lazzari", in Ashenden: Or the British Agent, 1928
- R. J. Popplewell, Intelligence and Imperial Defence: British Intelligence and the Defence of the Indian Empire 1904–1924, 1995
- N. K. Barooah, Chatto: The Life and Times of an Indian Anti-Imperialist in Europe, 2004

=== Archives ===
- Swiss Federal Archives, Bern, Meta Brunner; M. Maares-Brunner, Amsterdam
- Stadtarchiv Emmerich am Rhein
