= Mathilde Mallinger =

Austrian opera singer (1847–1920)

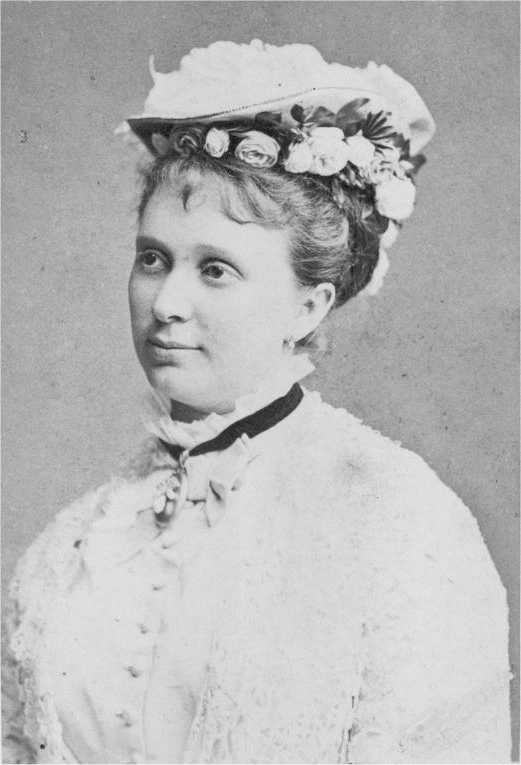
Mathilde Mallinger

Mathilde Mallinger (Croatian pronunciation: [mǎliŋger]; 17 February 1847 – 19 April 1920) was a Croatian lyric soprano who performed in operas and concerts. After retiring from performance she worked as a voice teacher.

== Life and career ==
Born as Mathilde Lichtenegger in Graz, the daughter of composer and teacher Vatroslav Lichtenegger, she studied singing with Giovanni Battista Gordigiani at the Prague Conservatory and with Richard Loewy in Vienna. While in Vienna she met Richard Wagner, who, after hearing her sing, recommended her to the Munich Hofoper. The opera house engaged her upon his recommendation and she made her professional opera debut there in 1866 in the title role of Vincenzo Bellini's Norma. She spent the next three years performing at that house, singing primarily Wagner roles like Elsa in Lohengrin and Elisabeth in Tannhäuser. She created the role of Eva in the world premiere of Richard Wagner's Die Meistersinger von Nürnberg on 21 June 1868.

Mallinger left Munich to join the roster of principal artists at the Berlin State Opera in 1869. She sang at that house through 1882. She notably sang in the Berlin premieres of Lohengrin (Elsa, 1869), Die Meistersinger von Nürnberg (1870) and Giuseppe Verdi's Aida (Aida, 1874). She also portrayed Ingeborg in the world premiere of Bernard Hopffner's Frithjof (11 April 1871) and sang in the premiere of Wilhelm Taubert's Cesario oder Was ihr wollt (13 November 1874). Other roles she sang in Berlin included Leonore in Fidelio, Agathe in Der Freischütz, Sieglinde in Die Walküre, Valentine in Les Huguenots and several Mozart heroines, including Pamina, Donna Anna and Countess Almaviva.

Mallinger had a notorious rivalry with the soprano Pauline Lucca while at the Berlin State Opera. The conflict between the two extended among their fans as well, with supporters of Mallinger and supporters of Lucca heckling one another. The tension came to a climax on 27 January 1872 in a performance of Mozart's The Marriage of Figaro in which Mallinger sang the Countess and Lucca portrayed Cherubino. During the performance supporters of Mallinger booed Lucca so severely that she was prevented from singing her aria. So upset by this event, Lucca broke her contract with the opera house and left the German capital to perform elsewhere.

Outside of Berlin, Mallinger made a number of guest appearances at the Vienna State Opera and the Mariinsky Theatre in St Petersburg. Although she retired from the opera stage in 1882, she continued to perform as a concert singer up through 1895. She was married to Baron Otto Schimmelpfenig Oye (1838–1912), who, under the name Otto Düringsfeld, appeared as an actor and later ran the Berlin Palace Theater. Their daughter Marie Mallinger (1878–1959) was an opera singer who performed at the Theater of Elberfeld and at various Berlin theaters. Marie married Martin Zickel (1877–1932), a German actor and theater director active in Berlin.

From 1890–1895, Mallinger worked as a celebrated singing teacher in Prague and then taught at the Eichelberg'schen Konservatorium in Berlin up until her death. Among her pupils were Lotte Lehmann, Johannes Bischoff, Emmy Neiendorff, Henny Trundt and Florence Wickham. She died in Berlin at the age of 73.

== Sources ==
- E. Marktl: "Mallinger Mathilde". In: Österreichisches Biographisches Lexikon 1815–1950 (ÖBL). Vol. 6, Austrian Academy of Sciences, Vienna 1975, ISBN 3-7001-0128-7, p. 38 f. (Direct links to "p. 38", "p. 39")
- Ludwig Eisenberg: Großes biographisches Lexikon der Deutschen Bühne im 19. Jahrhundert. List, Leipzig 1903, S. 634–635.
