= Vatroslav Lichtenegger =

Croatian music teacher and composer

Vatroslav Lichtenegger (1809–1885) was a Croatian music teacher and composer.

Born in Podčetrtek, he moved to Zagreb around 1827, and became a choralist in the Zagreb Cathedral as well as a teacher at the Croatian Music Institute. Lichtenegger was a teacher of singing and organist of the Zagreb Cathedral. He scored and harmonized the song Horvatska domovina by Josip Runjanin for a male choir in 1861. In 1891, the song won a competition to become the Croatian national anthem.

He is buried in the Mirogoj cemetery in Zagreb. His daughter was famous opera singer Mathilde Mallinger.
