= Norbert (dog) =

American therapy dog (2009–2025)

- Species: Canis familiaris
- Sex: Male
- Born: March 27, 2009; California, U.S.
- Died: January 26, 2025 (aged 15); California, U.S.
- Owner: Julie Steines née Freyermuth
- Weight: 3 lb (1.4 kg)
- Height: 7 in (18 cm)

Norbert (March 27, 2009 – January 26, 2025) was an American mixed breed registered therapy dog, best known for his Norbert picture book series, and his popularity on social media. Norbert's breed is unknown, but is suspected to be a cross between chihuahua, Cairn Terrier and Lhasa Apso. Norbert's time, money and book revenue is given to various charitable causes throughout the United States.

His first book, Norbert: What Can Little Me Do? was published by Polly Parker Press and won nine book awards in 2014 including Next Generation Indie Book Awards, Nautilus Book Awards, and Ben Franklin Award.

== Background ==
After the release of the first book about Norbert in 2013, he had regularly made public appearances and also worked as a therapy dog. As part of the publicity surrounding Norbert, he began to receive media coverage about his therapy work and also his books.

From 2015, Norbert and Lil Bub the cat were part of Norbert's third book in his series. Collectively the owners of both animals started a Kickstarter campaign, in order to raise money for the release of their latest book. Within the first 15 hours, they had exceeded their goal and raised more than $30,000 for the book to be published. The book was titled, Norbert and Lil BUB: What Can Little We Do?

Norbert was also recognized as a YouTube star after a video of him being fed cheese received over 1.5 million views, while also having a large following on Instagram, Facebook and Twitter.

After the rise of his popularity, Norbert was featured in a number of publications and television shows. These included, TIME magazine, Right This Minute, InStyle, The Hallmark Channel and People magazine.

Norbert died on January 26, 2025, at the age of 15.

== Therapy and philanthropy ==
Norbert's daily activities were mainly focused on being a volunteer therapy dog to people young and old who are ill or in need. He had volunteered at nursing homes, hospitals, special events and schools. Norbert and his partner, Julie Steines, were a registered therapy animal team with the Pet Partners organization. Norbert was also an American Kennel Club Canine Good Citizen and a certified R.E.A.D. dog with the Intermountain Therapy Animals organization.

== Books ==
From 2013, Norbert was featured in a number of children's books. The first book about Norbert was published in November 2013, Norbert: What Can Little Me Do? The book was written by Julie Freyermuth and illustrated by Julie and Virginia Freyermuth. The children's book led to Norbert touring and visiting numerous schools, from grades PreK to Grade 8. The book tells the story of Norbert, moving to a big city. As part of the move, he records his adventures in his personal artist's journal. The book is inspired by his becoming a therapy dog in real life.

The second book about Norbert is titled Norbert: What Can Little YOU Do? and features real-life friends of Norbert.

The third installment of the Norbert book series was a collaboration with another famous animal, Lil Bub. Following a Kickstarter campaign, Norbert and Lil Bub collaborated on the book, Norbert and Lil BUB: What Can Little We Do? The Kickstarter campaign raised over $100,000 prior to book sales. $15,000 was donated to Lil Bub's Fund to help homeless animals with special needs and nearly 2,000 books were donated to children in need.

== See also ==
- List of individual dogs
