= Norbert Mamangy =

Malagasy politician

Norbert Mamangy is a Malagasy politician. A member of the National Assembly of Madagascar. He was elected as a deputy in the 2007 Malagasy parliamentary elections as a member of the Tiako I Madagasikara party. He has since been reelected as an independent candidate in 2013 and 2019. with 60.23% of the votes. He represents the constituency of Sambava.
