= John Brunner =

John Brunner may refer to:

- John Brunner (author) (1934–1995), British author, mainly of science fiction
- Sir John Brunner, 1st Baronet (1842–1919), British industrialist and Member of Parliament
- Sir John Brunner, 2nd Baronet (1865–1929), British Member of Parliament
- John L. Brunner (1929–1980), American politician

== See also ==
- Brunner (disambiguation)
- Brunner baronets
