= Conrad Brunner (monk) =

Benedictine abbot

Conrad Brunner (died 9 March 1410) was a Swiss Benedictine monk. From 1380 until his death, he was abbot of the monastery at Muri in today's Canton of Aargau.

Brunner was the son of a wealthy farmer, and inherited land and status. His home, in the hamlet of Hasli, was less than a kilometer from the monastery. In 1363, the monastery was severely damaged by a fire, and Brunner gave them a vineyard located in Thalwil to provide financial support. At some point he joined the order and on 26 April 1380, he was elected abbot. He was the first head of that abbey to come from largely peasant stock. In 1386 troops of the Swiss Confederacy pillaged the monastery during their struggle against the Habsburgs known as the Sempacherkriegs (War of the Sempacher, or the War of Lucerne's expansion), which culminated at the Battle of Sempach. Rebuilding the monastery and the local infrastructure was a slow process. In 1399, to compensate for the harm suffered and to help keep their loyalty, Brunner convinced the Habsburg Duke Leopold IV to donate the benefice of the parish of Villmergen to the monastery and again in 1403 the parishes of Sursee and Oberlunkhofen.

Benedictine monks did not take a vow of poverty and retained their former estates and property, which they used to support themselves and the community. They were assisted by benefices from outside such as the ones from Duke Leopold. But by 1402, the monastery had run out of funds, and Abbot Konrad had to call a court (Gericht), so that the income from the parish of Sursee could be, at least temporarily, diverted for the reconstruction of some of the monastery buildings. The gift by the duke the following year alleviated some of his problems. Abbot Konrad was also noted for his restrictions on the number of monks who were paid by the monastery, so as not to overload their economy.

== Bibliography ==
- Kiem, P. Martin (1888). Geschichte der Benedictiner Abtei Muri-Gries: Muri's älteste und Mittlere Geschichte (in German). Vol. 1. pp. 166–184., reprinted from 1881 edition
