= Anna Brunner (violinist) =

Swiss violinist (born 1972)

- Born: 1972 (age 52–53); Zurich, Switzerland

Anna Brunner (née Weber; born 1972) is a Swiss violinist.

== Musical career ==
Anna Brunner began playing the violin as a child. She received her basic musical education from her father Rudolf Weber (violist) and her mother Elisabeth Weber-Erb. She then received her academic training in violin at the Winterthur Conservatory, graduating with a teaching diploma in 1992, and from Thomas Füri at the Basel Music Academy, graduating with a concert diploma in 1995. She attended master classes with Isaac Stern, Walter Levin of the LaSalle String Quartet and Hatto Beyerle of the Alban Berg Quartet, among others.

Together with her younger sister Maja Weber, she founded the Amar Quartet in 1987. The quartet won several prizes at competitions in 1998 and 1999. In 1999, the Habisreutinger Foundation loaned the Amar Quartet two violins, a viola and a cello from Antonio Stradivari's workshop. After Maja Weber left the quartet, these instruments were taken over by the Stradivari Quartet.

In addition to the Amar Quartet, Anna Brunner also plays in other chamber music formations. On her website, she lists some of her chamber music partners, including Shaun Choo, Benjamin Engeli and Christopher Hinterhuber (each on piano), Christoph Croisé (violoncello), Bernhard Röthlisberger (clarinet) and the Jungman & Sancho Tango Duo. She also gives private lessons for violin students and master classes for chamber musicians.

== Other activities and personal life ==
Brunner is interested in alternative healing methods and relaxation techniques. She works as a hypnotherapist and is a member of the Swiss Professional Association for Hypnotherapy.

She is passionate about photography, from handicrafts to portraits and macro photography. She offers herself as a photographer for private parties. She also expresses her creativity in her hobbies of handicrafts, knitting, sewing and decorating her home.

Brunner has four children. She lives in Hünibach on Lake Thun in the canton of Bern.
