= Norbert Lichtenegger =

Austrian footballer

Personal information
- Date of birth: 14 November 1951 (age 74)
- Position: Defender

Senior career*
| Years | Team | Apps | (Gls) |
| 1975–1983 | Wiener Sport-Club | 181 | (0) |
| 1983–1985 | 1. Simmeringer SC | | |
| 1985–1986 | First Vienna | | |
- * Club domestic league appearances and goals

Norbert Lichtenegger (born 14 November 1951) is an Austrian former footballer who played for Wiener Sport-Club in the Austrian Football Bundesliga.
