= Eric Brunner (epidemiologist) =

British epidemiologist (born 1953)

Eric John Brunner (born July 1953) is professor of social and biological epidemiology and public health at University College London.
