= Norbert Geng =

German lawyer (born 1965)

Norbert Geng (born 1965) is a German lawyer and professor of special business law.

== Biography ==
Geng studied law at University of Würzburg and completed his legal clerkship from 1994 to 1995. He worked as an editorial journalist for the WISO-Steuerbrief (ZDF) and afterwards as a lawyer in Erfurt for four years before he became syndic of the HUK-Coburg insurance group. In 2000 he graduated at the University of Jena with his conferral of a doctorate about "Ausgleich und Abfindung der Minderheitsaktionäre der beherrschten Aktiengesellschaft bei Verschmelzung und Spaltung" ("Chargeback and compensation of the minority shareholders of the controlled Aktiengesellschaft during merger and splitting."). Since 2002 he has been professor at the faculty of commercial law at the University of Applied Sciences in Schmalkalden.

Geng is member of the Hayek Society and adheres to the Austrian School of economics. In 2010, he became co-president of the Party of Reason (pdv). He resides in Grünsfeld.
