= Norbert Zeh =

German computer scientist

Norbert Zeh is a German computer scientist, currently a Canada Research Chair at Dalhousie University. He completed his PhD from Carleton University in 2002.
