= Norbert Brunner (artist) =

Austrian installation art artist

- Born: July 17, 1969 (age 57); Hohenems, Austria
- Education: University of Applied Arts Vienna
- Known for: object art, new media art, installation art
- Website: www.norbertbrunner.com

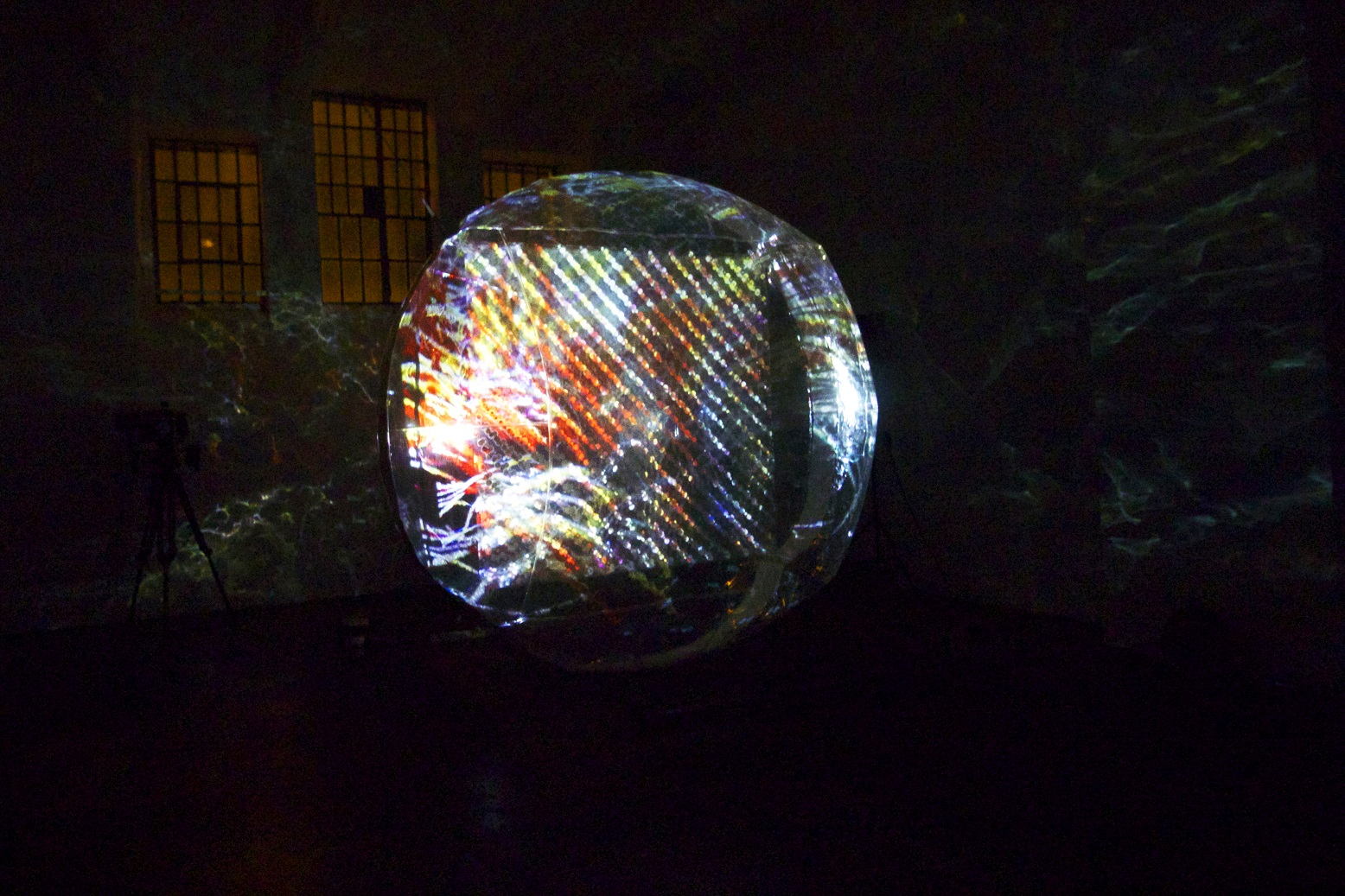
Timebubble 2009, Belvedere 21, Vienna, Austria

Norbert Brunner (born 1969, Hohenems, Austria) is an Austrian object, conceptual and installation artist.

Norbert Brunner was born in Hohenems, Vorarlberg Austria. After being raised in Vorarlberg he served a joinery apprenticeship and attended a vocational school for sculpture in Elbigenalp, Tyrol. He studied sculpting on the University of Applied Arts Vienna with professor Wander Bertoni.

Brunner has public projects in Kobe, Japan; Edmonton, Canada and Birmington, UK. His work has been exhibited in Beijing, China; Sydney, Australia; London, UK; Moscow, Russia; Berlin, Germany; Paris, France; Vienna, Graz, Austria; Geneva, Swiss; Prague, Czech; New York City, Dallas, USA; Osaka, Nagoya, Kyoto, Japan as well as Almaty, Kazakhstan.

He participated in the biennale in Valencia, the architecture biennale in Beijing, the 2005 expo Aichi in Nagoya, Japan and the Royal Academy of Arts Summer Exhibition in London and has taken a part in cultural events in Austria including, Vienna Opera Ball, Life Ball and Bregenz Festival.

His works are part of the museum collections of the 21 Haus in Vienna, the New Britain Museum of American Art and the Vorarlberger Landesmuseum.

== Exhibitions ==
- Norbert Brunner - Perception, Unix Gallery, New York City, February to April 2025
- Norbert Brunner - Fuck Luck, Claire Oliver Gallery, New York City, April 2010

== Publications ==
- Norbert Brunner by Oliver Goetz, Triton Verlag, 2003
