= Chahartaq (architecture) =

Architectural structure with four arches and a dome

Chartaq (Persian: چارطاق), chahartaq (چهارطاق), chartaqi (چارطاقی), or chahartaqi (چهارطاقی), meaning "having four arches", is an architectural unit consisted of four barrel vaults and a dome.

== History ==
Chartaqi was a prominent element in Iranian architecture, having various functions and used in both secular and religious contexts for 1,500 years, with the first instance being developed in the Sasanian city of Gor (Firuzabad) in 210s AD by King Ardashir I. The biggest instance of chahartaq is that of the so-called Palace of Shapur I at Bishapur, also in Pars. Many pre-Islamic chahartaqs have survived, but they are usually just the sole surviving structure of a much bigger complex. The chahartaq structure was adopted in Islamic architecture.

A related concept is čahārqāpū (چهارقاپو).

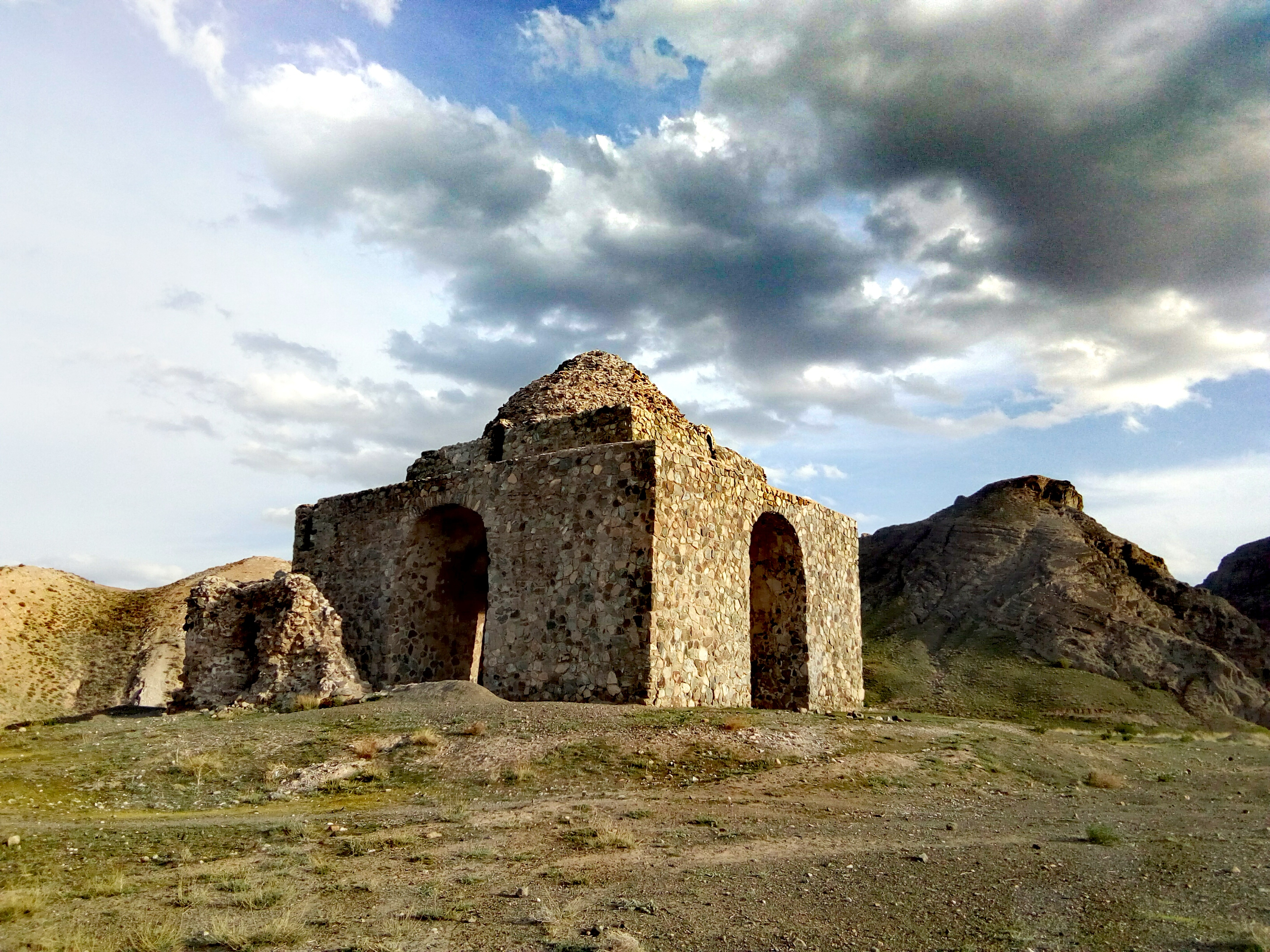
Baze Hoor fire temple, Arsacid period

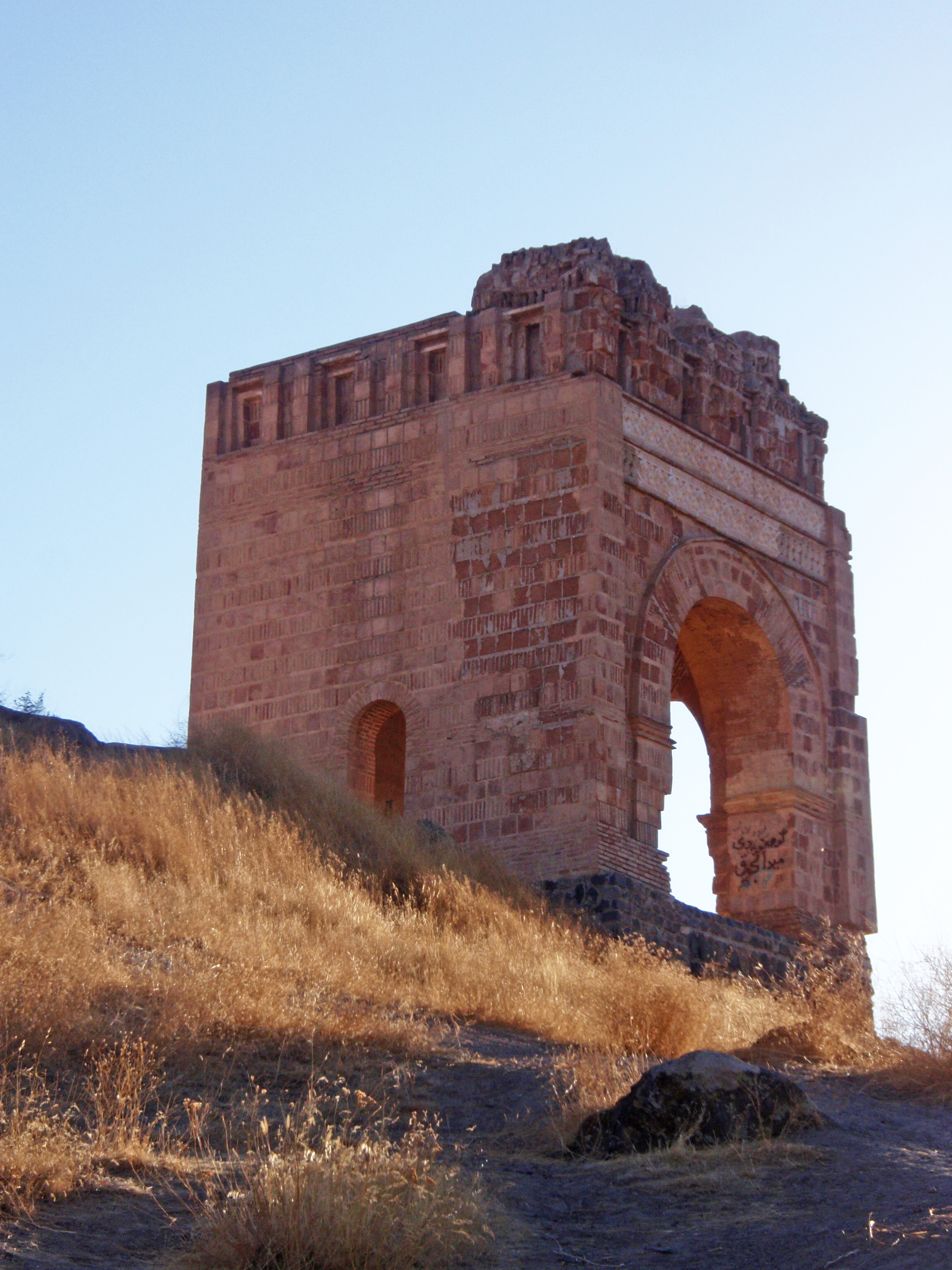
Chahartaqi of the Zahhak Castle, Arsacid period

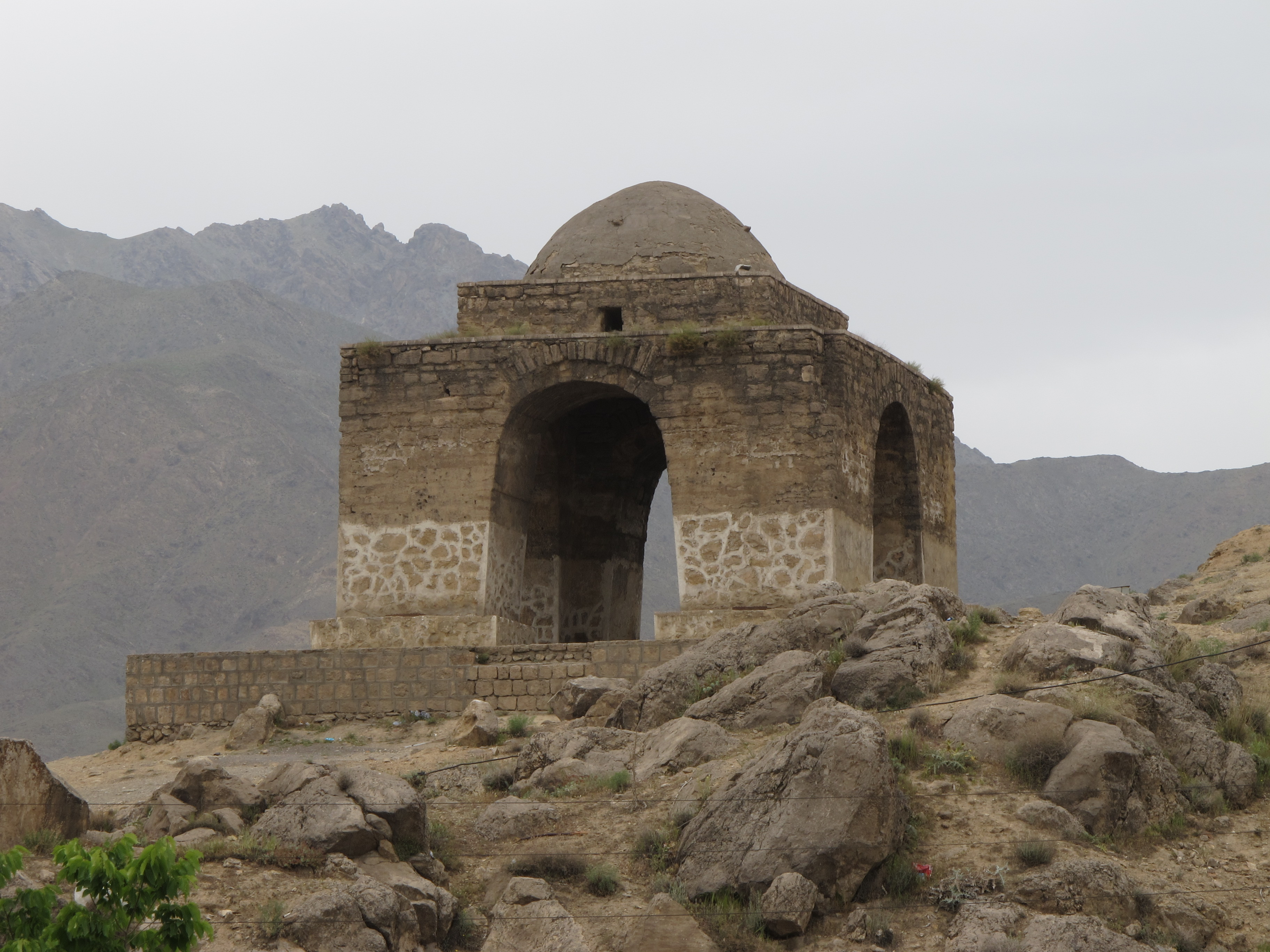
Chartaqi of Neyasar at Neyasar, Kashan, Iran. Late Arsacid
or early Sassanian era. It is one of the few intact chartaqis.

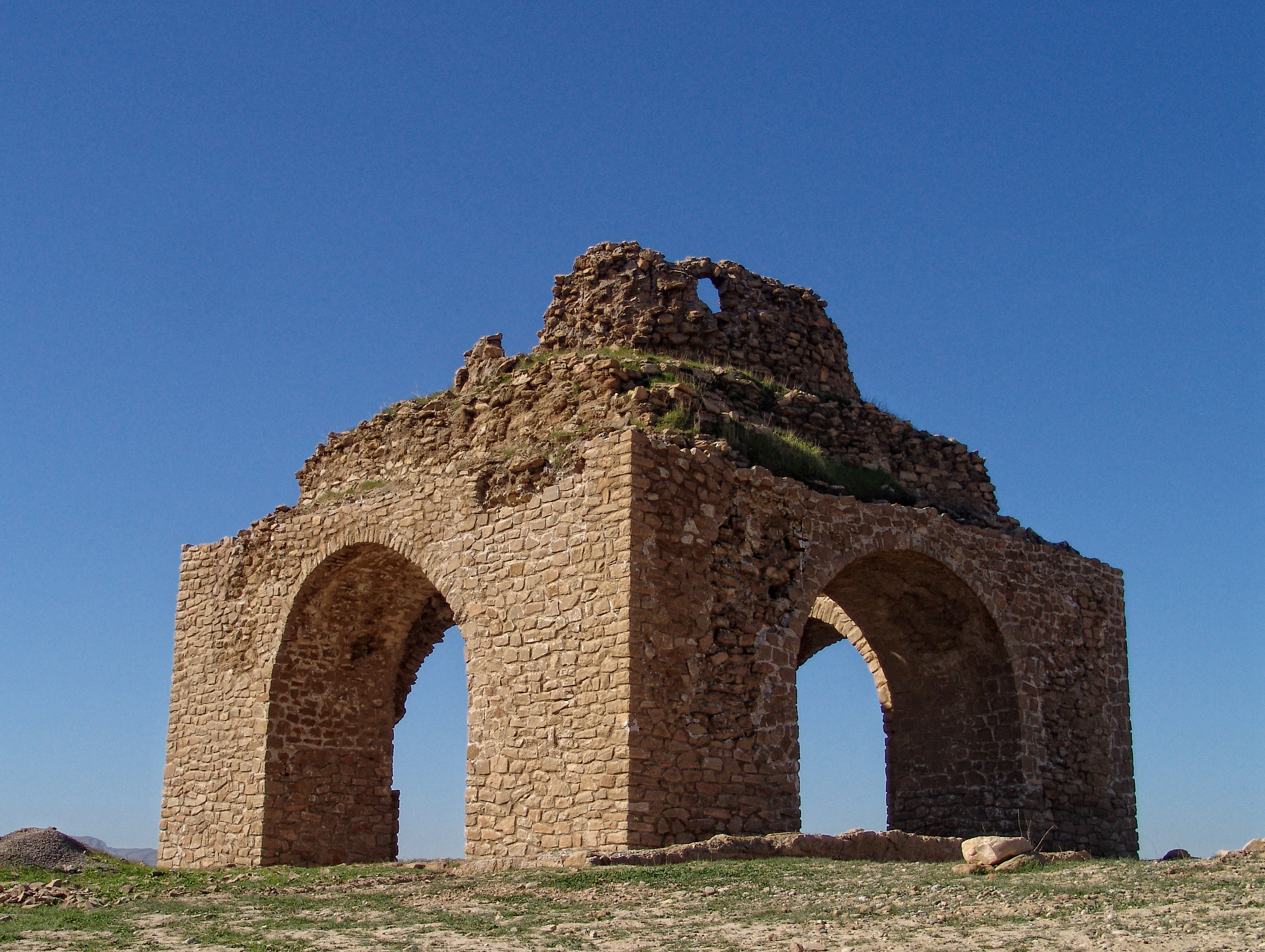
Chahartaqi of Kheirabad, Sassanian period

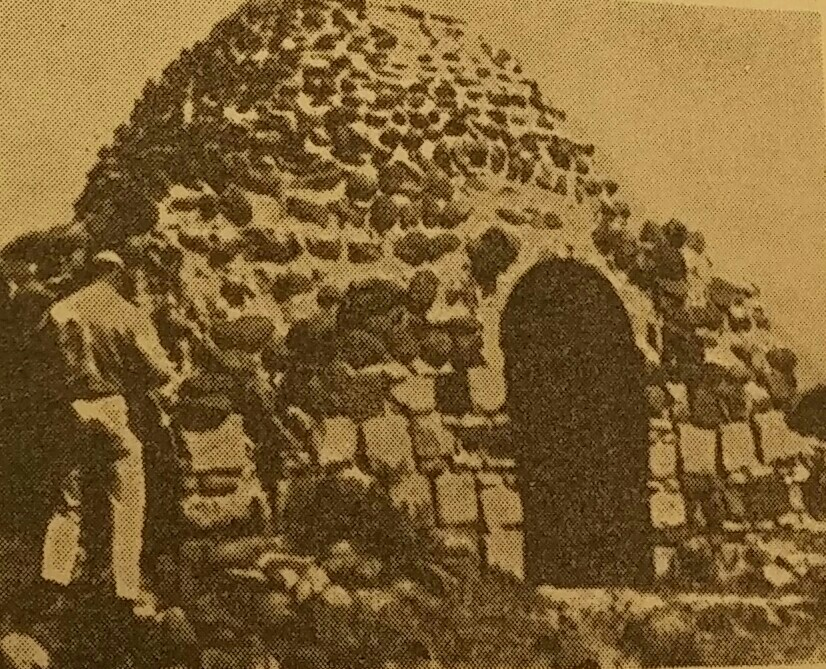
Chahartaq in Sarab, East Azerbaijan Province. Sassanian period

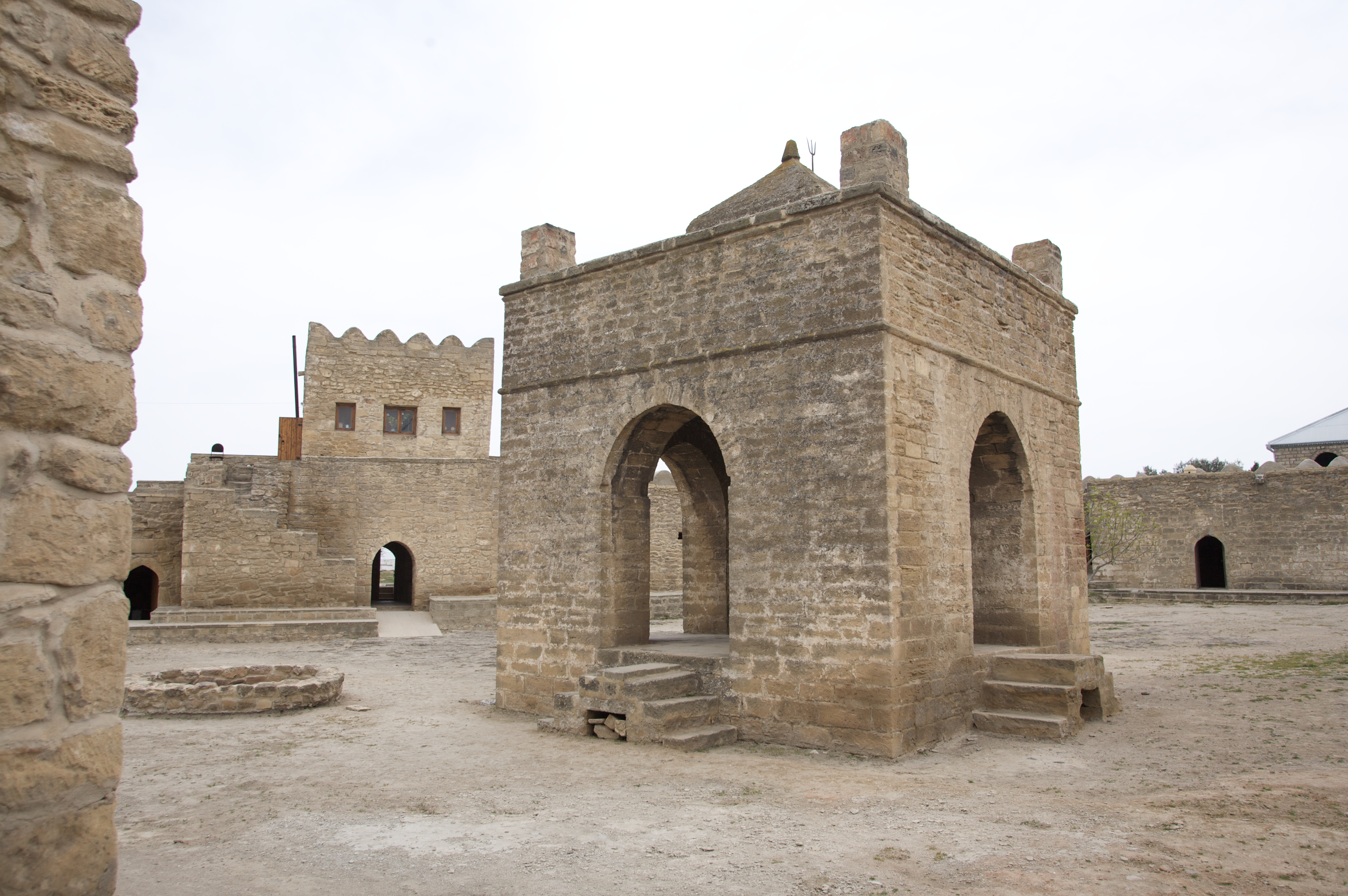
Ateshgah of Baku. Many pre-Islamic chartaqis were part of a fire temple

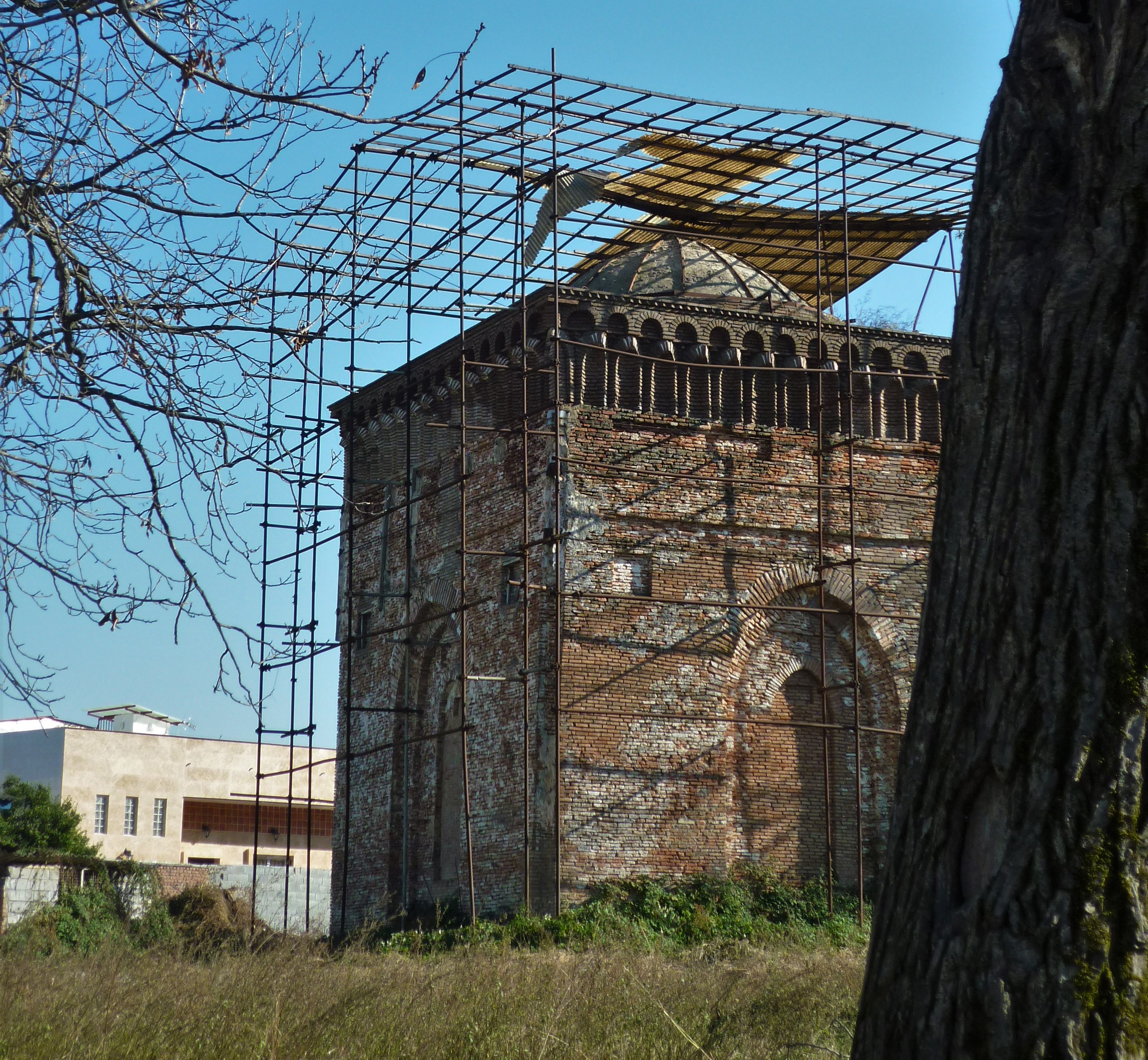
Fire Temple of Amol

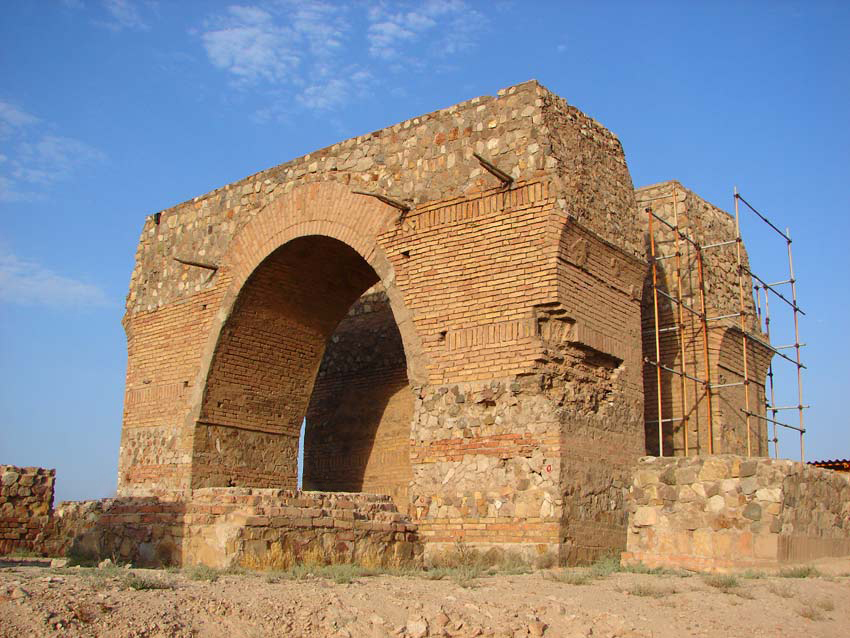
Bahram fire temple

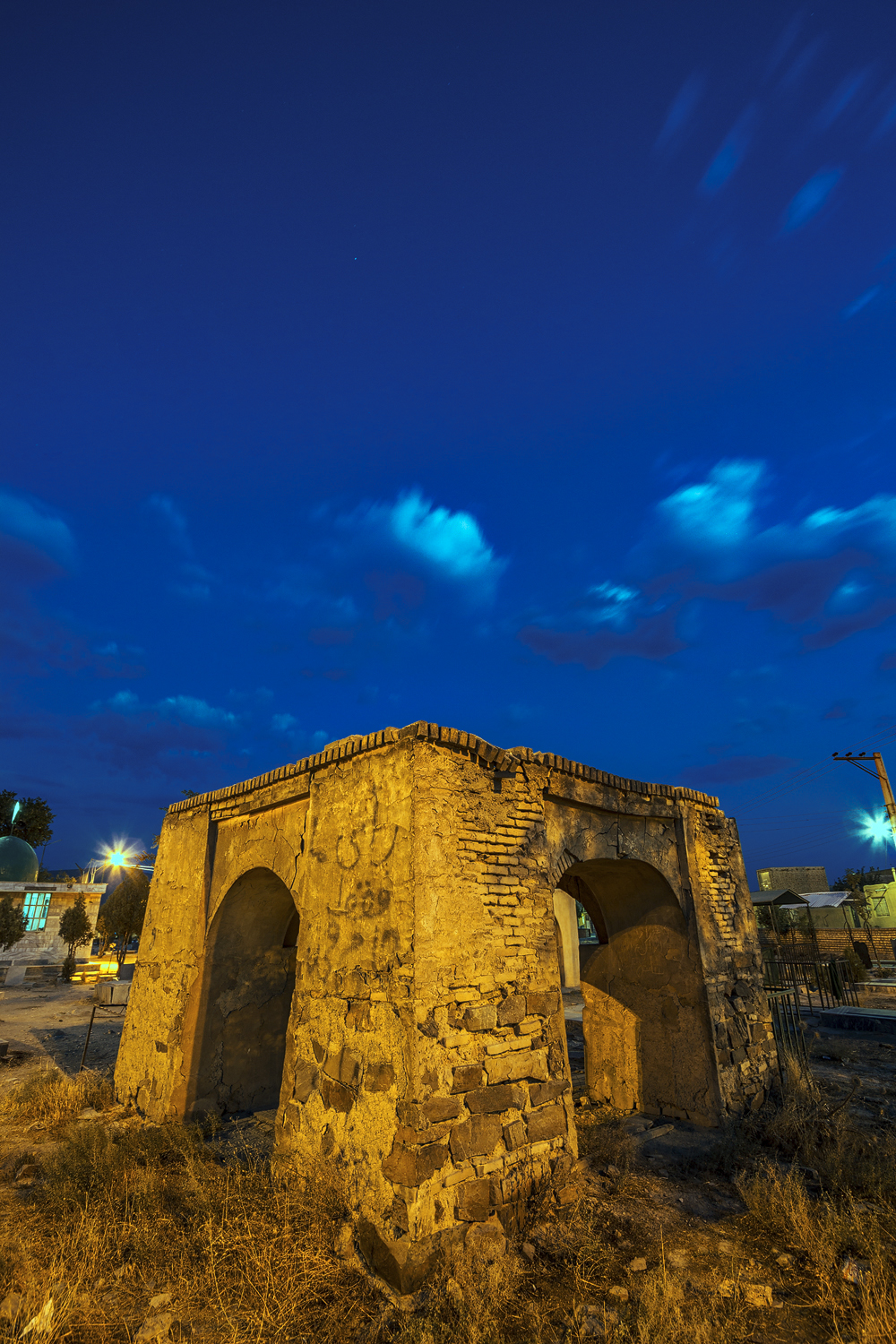
Chartaqi of Karchan

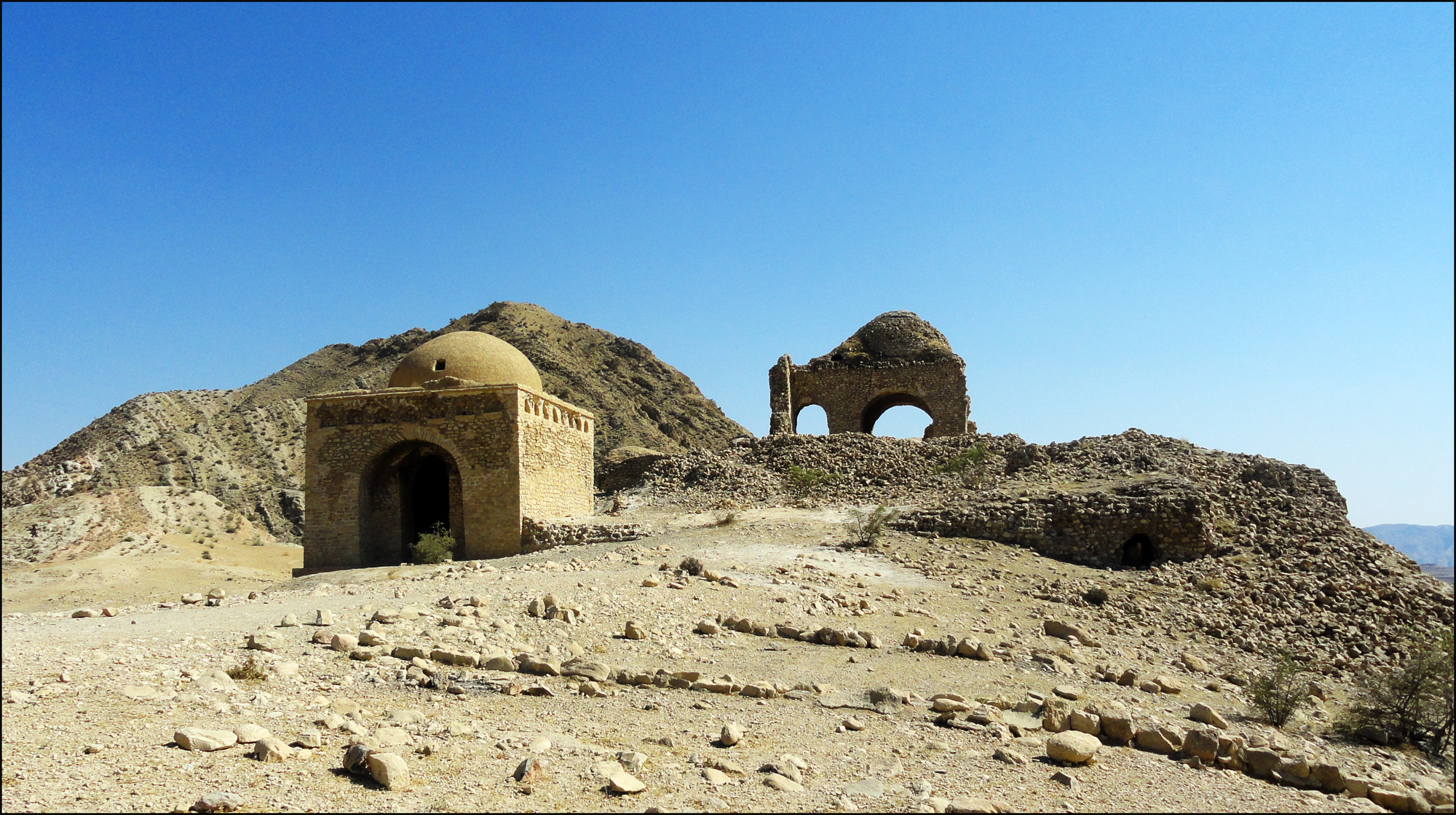
Chahartaqi of Konarsiyah

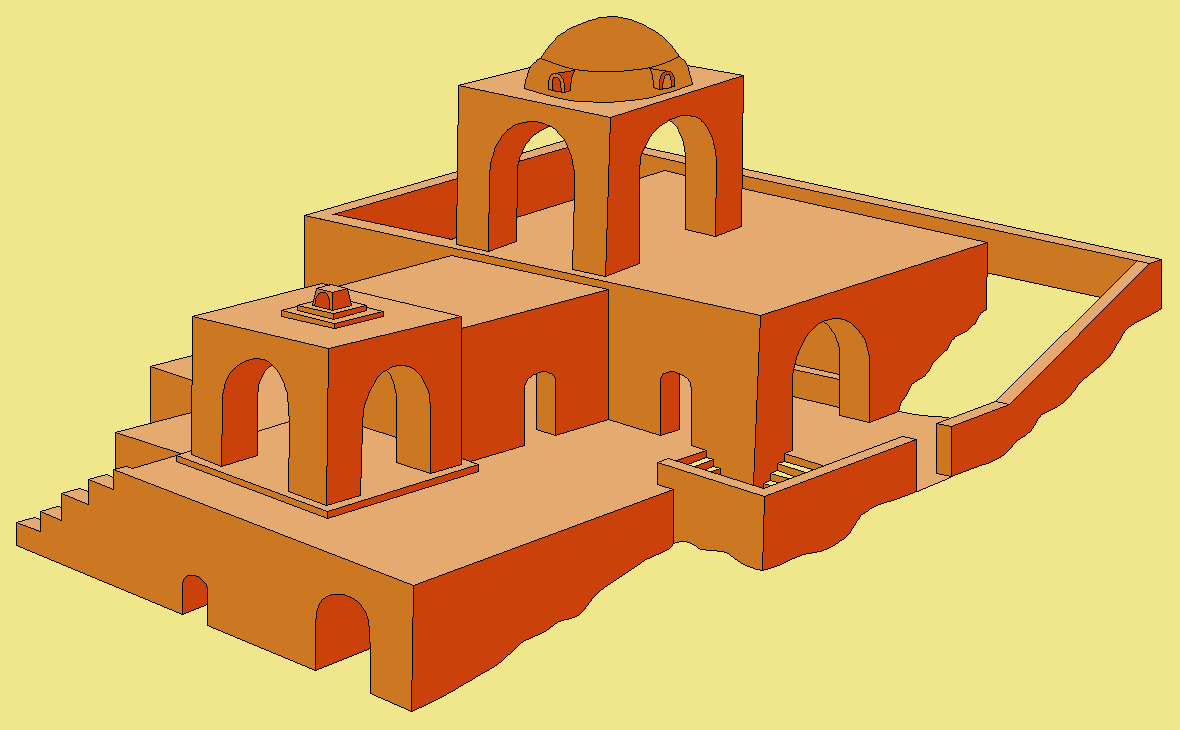
Chartaq on top of the Harpak fire temple in Abyaneh

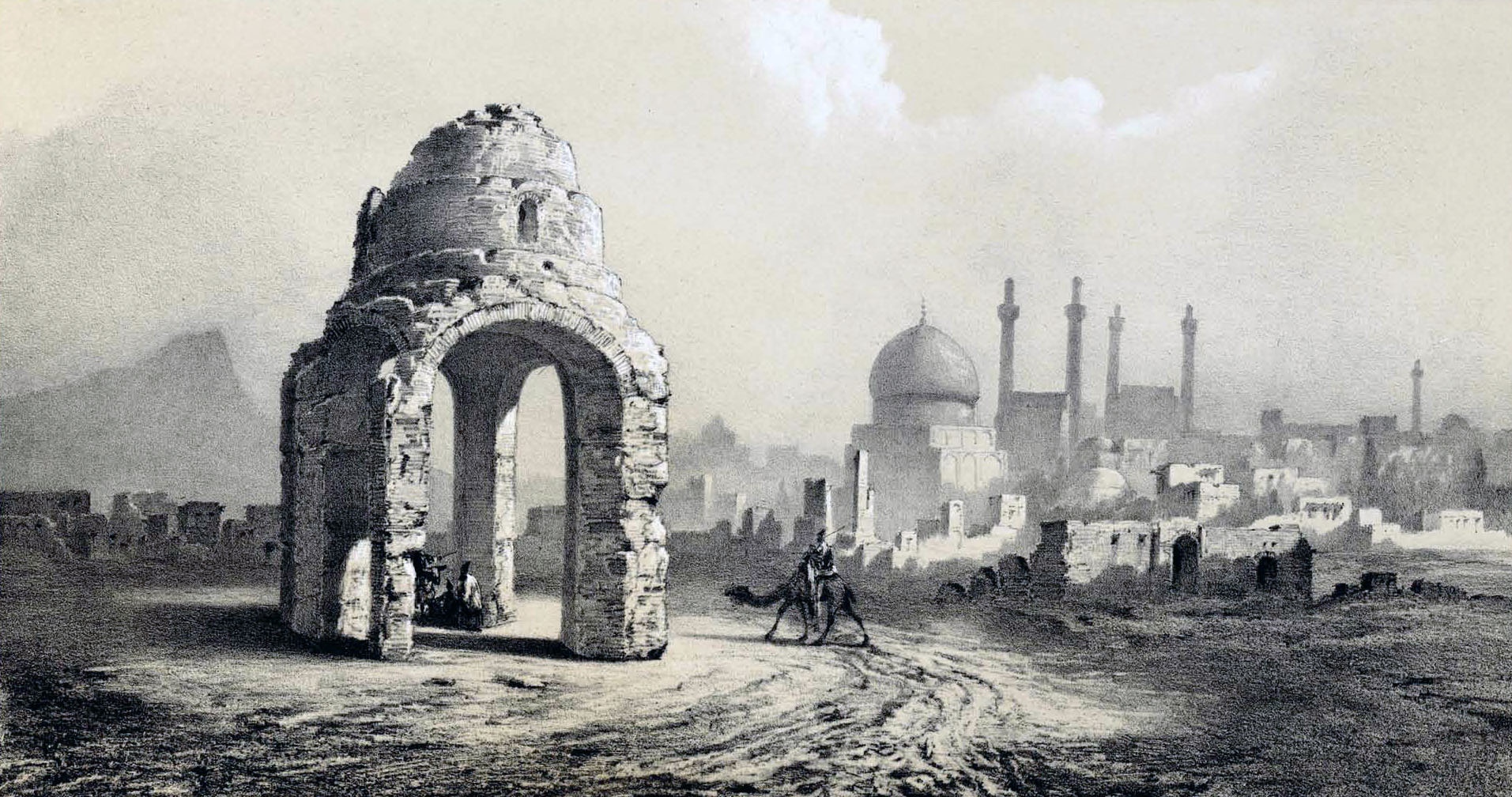
A chahartaq as a small mausoleum, with a grave inside, near Isfahan, 1840 drawing by Eugène Flandin

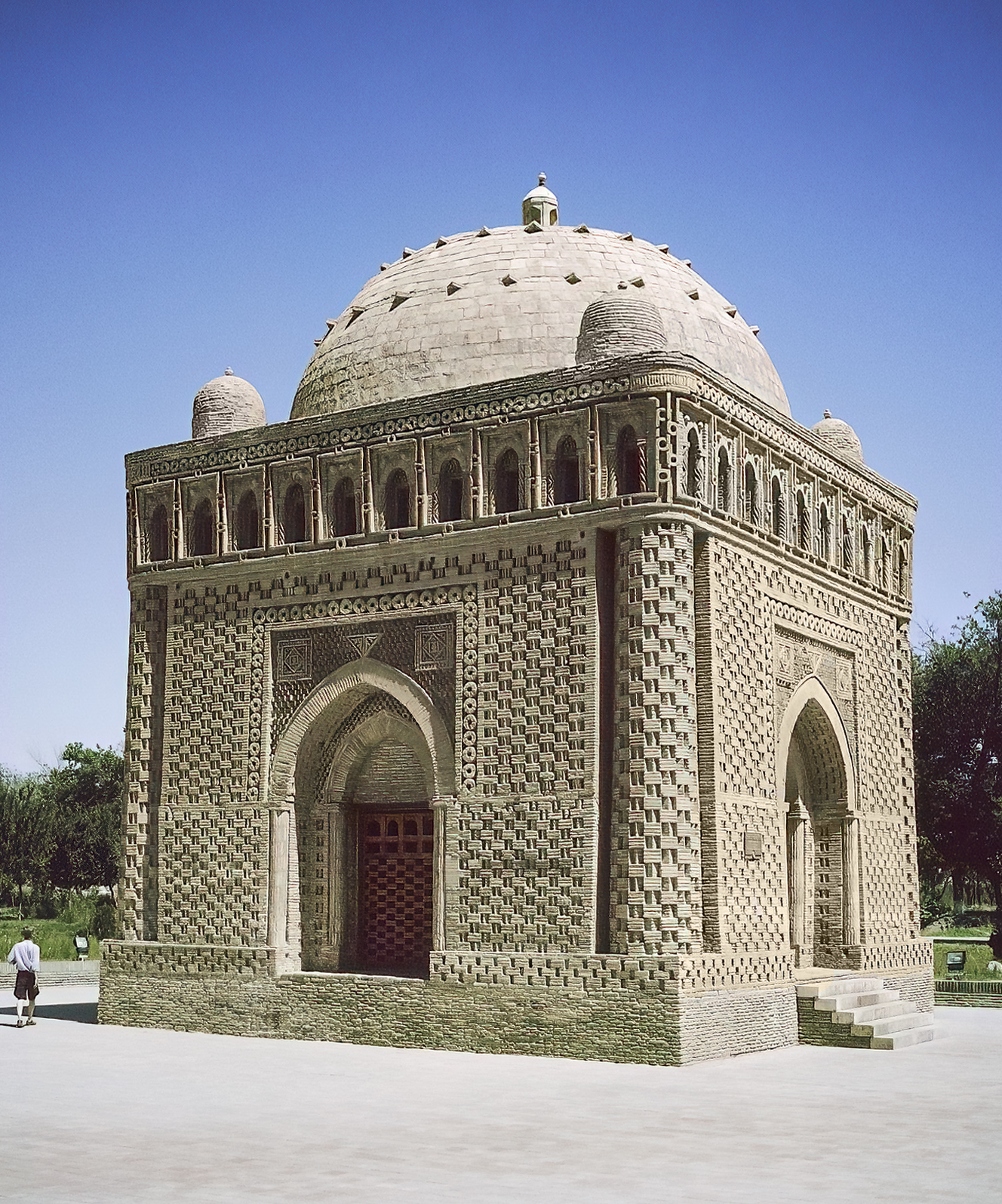
Samanid Mausoleum

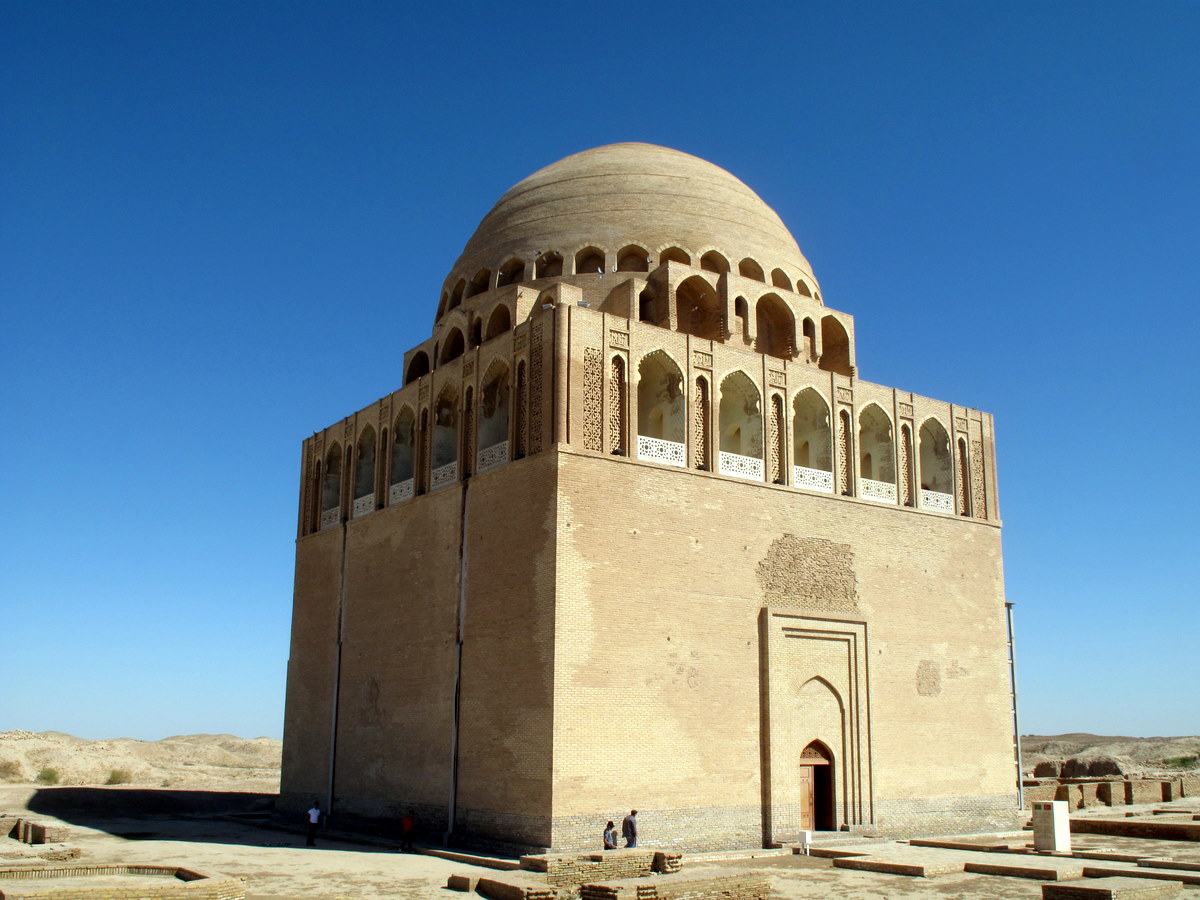
Tomb of Ahmed Sanjar

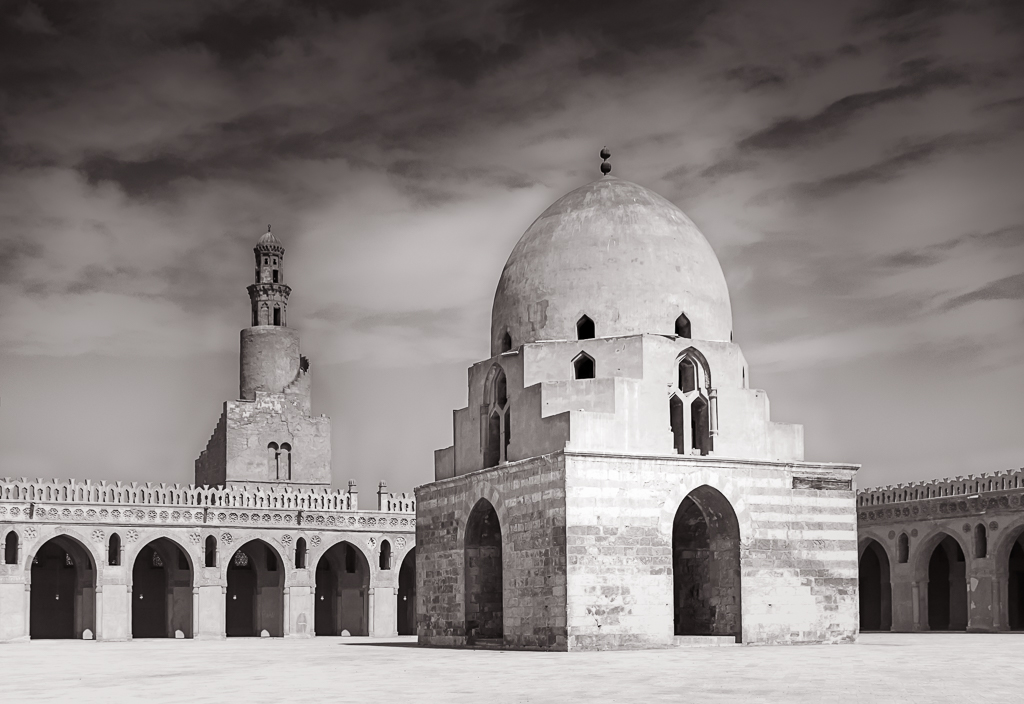
Sabil ablution fountain at Mosque of Ibn Tulun, Cairo, Egypt

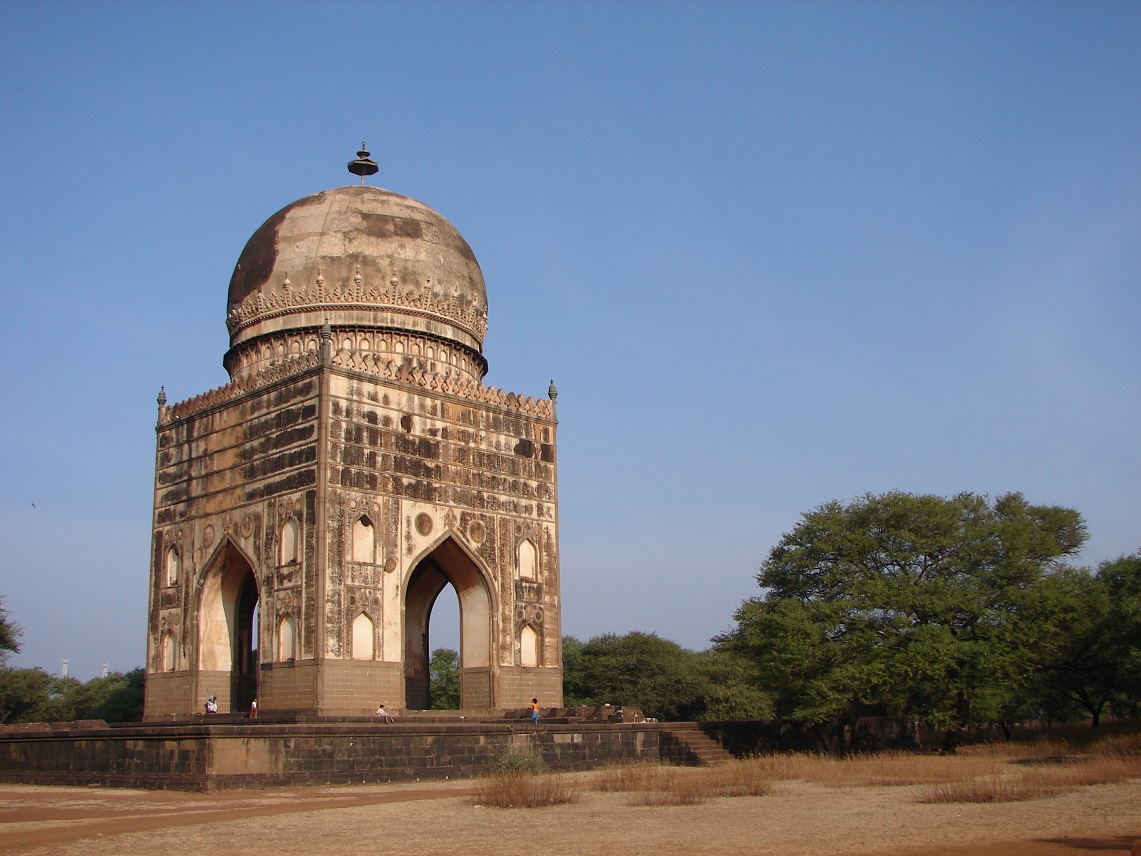
Tomb of Ali Barid Ali barid Shah, Bidar, India

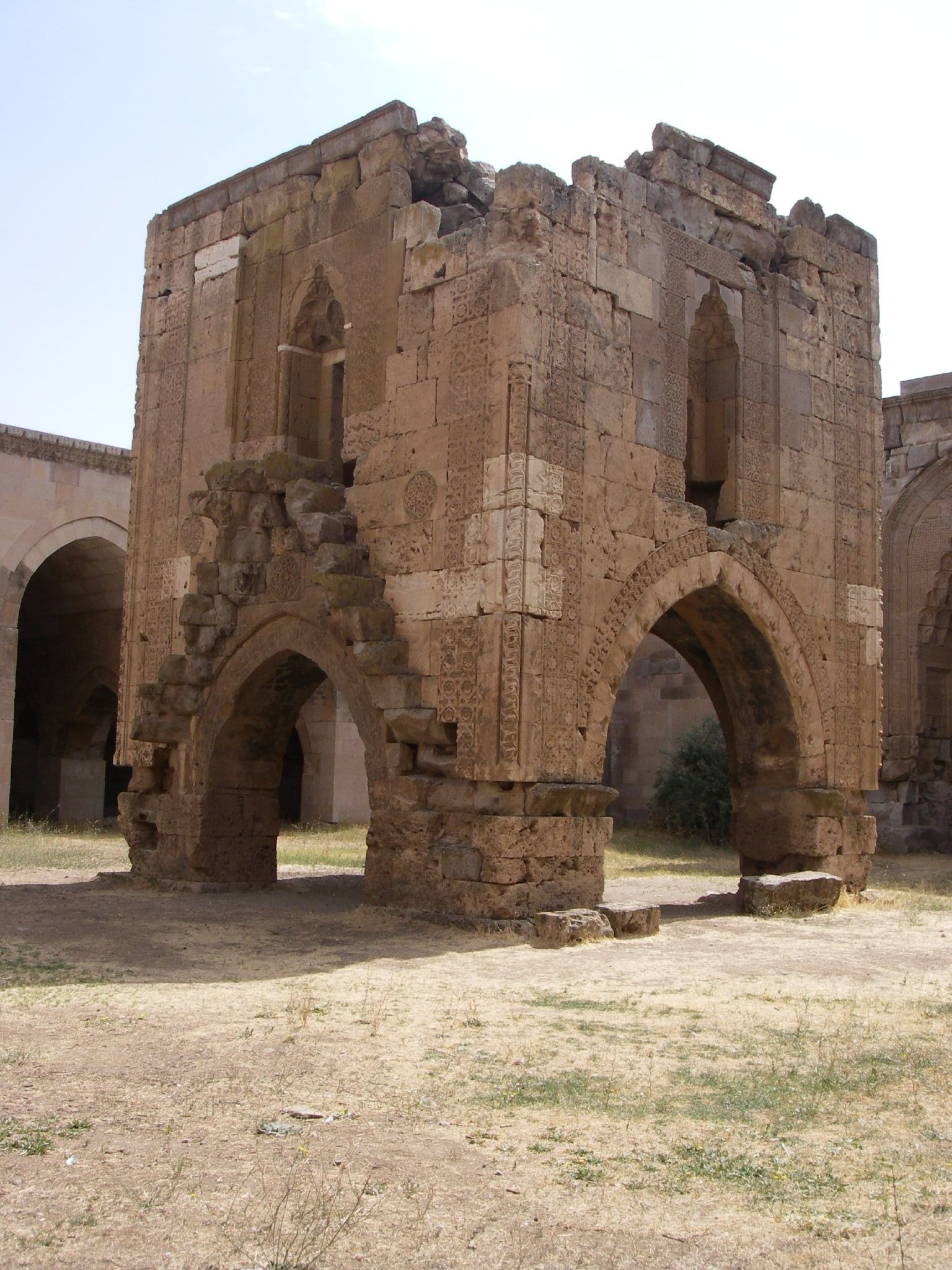
"Kiosk-mosque" at Sultan Han caravanserai, Turkey (Seljuq period) (see also Tetrapylon)

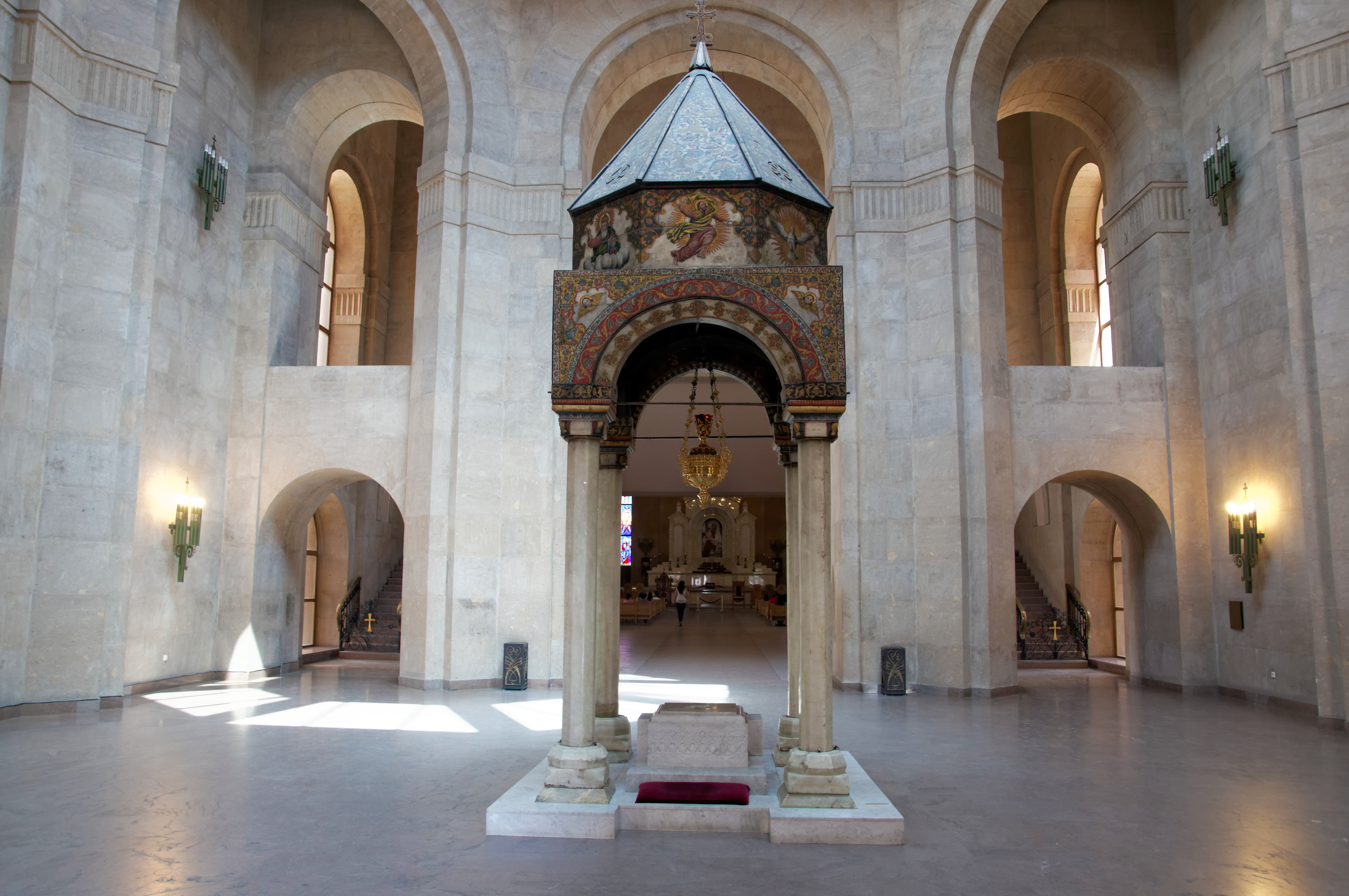
Saint Gregory the Illuminator Cathedral, Yerevan, Armenia

== Contemporary architecture ==
The main plan of the post-modern Azadi Tower in Tehran is said to be influenced by the architecture of chartaqis.

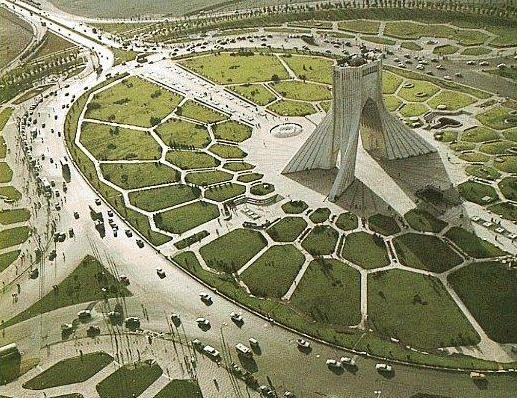
Azadi Tower

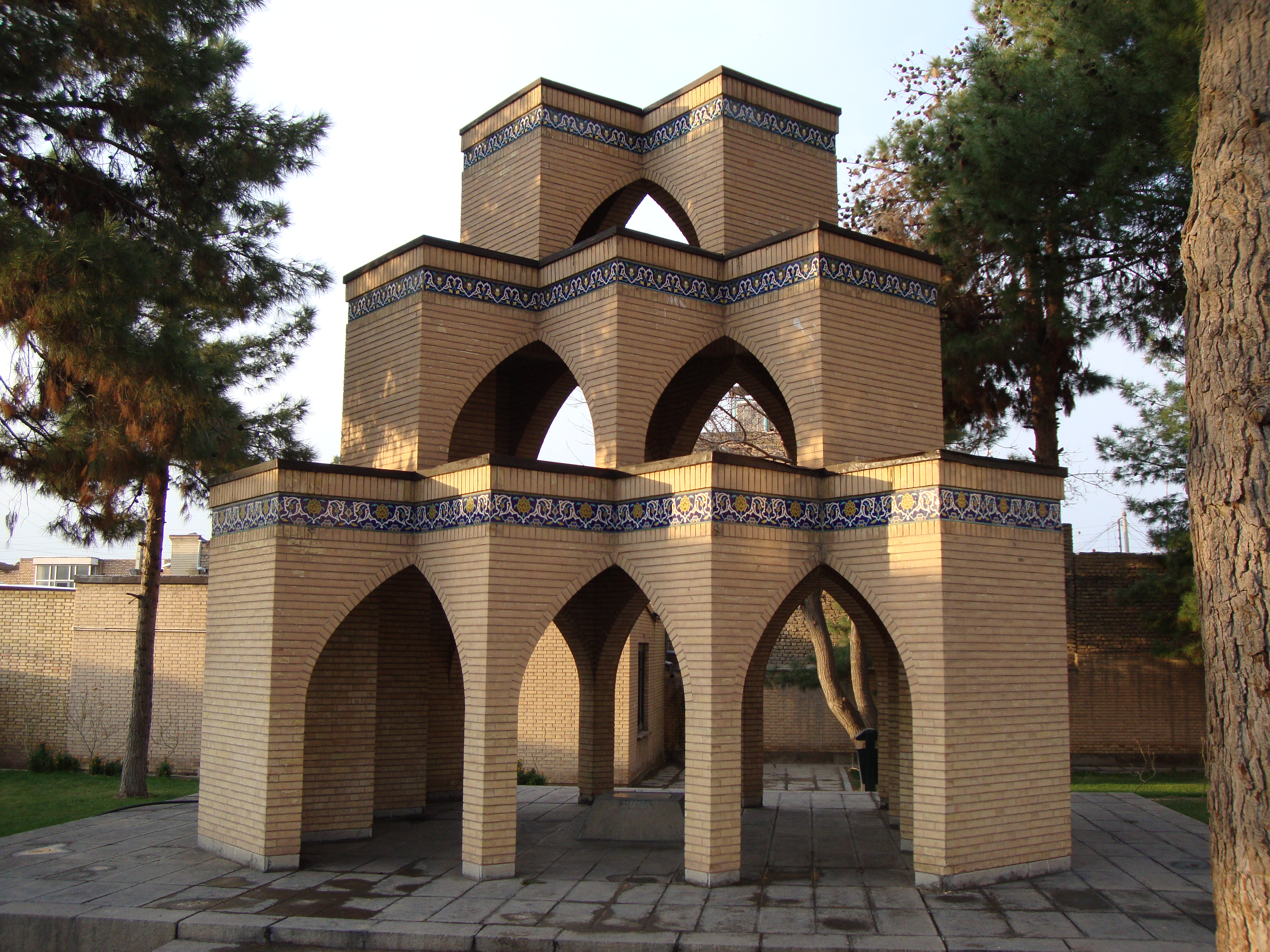
Monument of Molla Hossein Kashefi, Sabzevar, built in 1974.
The post-modern design has incorporated the concepts
of chahartaqi and iwans.

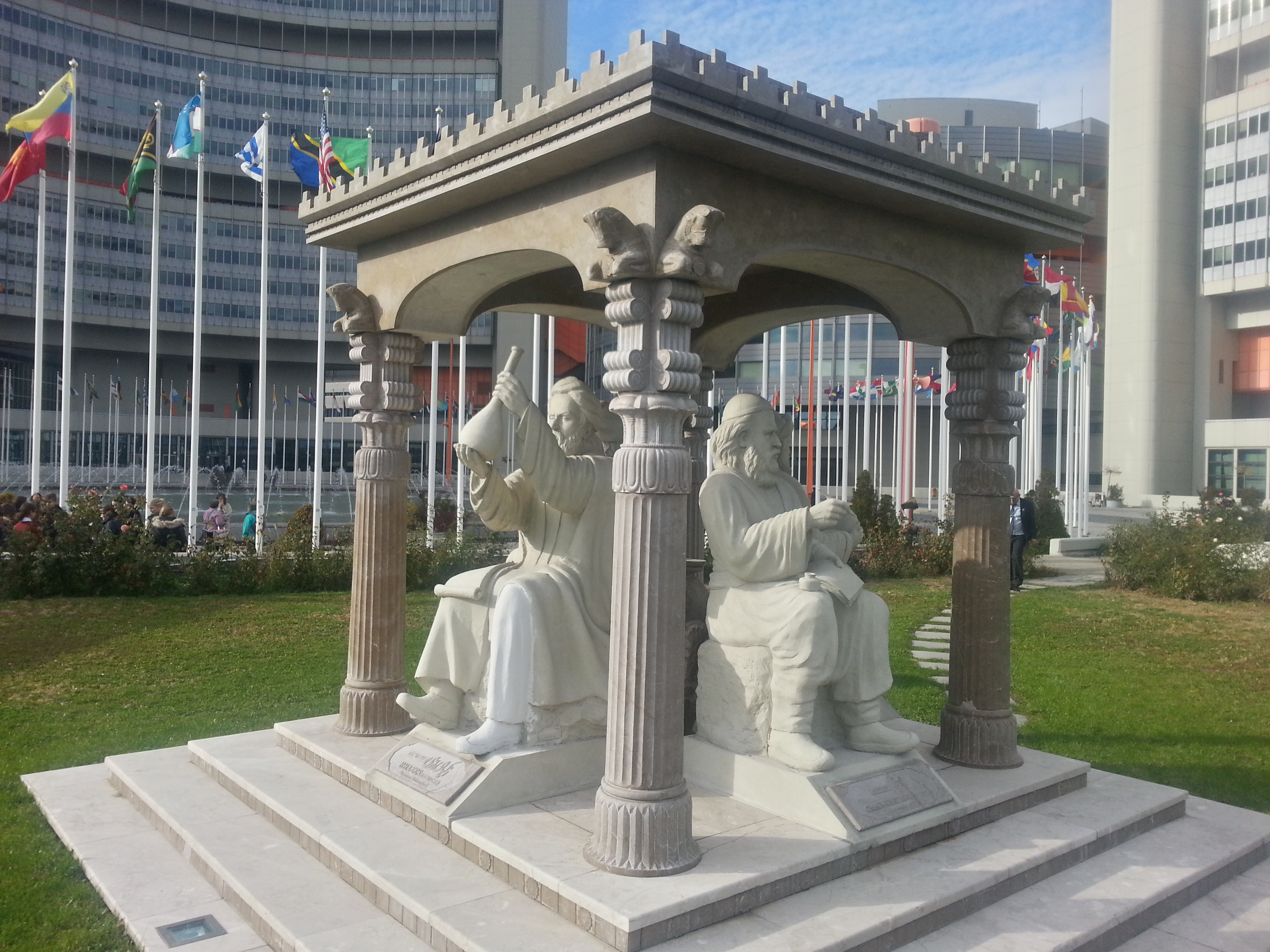
Scholars Pavilion (the Scholars Chartagi) in Vienna, a
chahartaqi with elements from the architecture of Persepolis

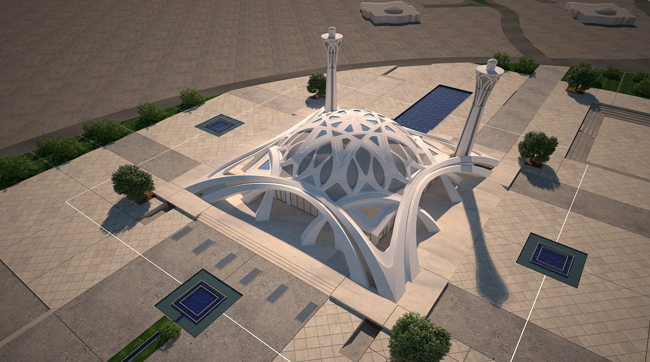
A sample of modern Islamic architecture - The mosque of international conferences center - Isfahan

== See also ==
- Chartaque
- Chhatri
- Fire temple
- Iwan
- Pavilion
- Kiosk
- Tetrapylon
- Triumphal arch
- Ka'be-ye Zartosht
