= Burgau, Styria =

Burgau
- Municipality
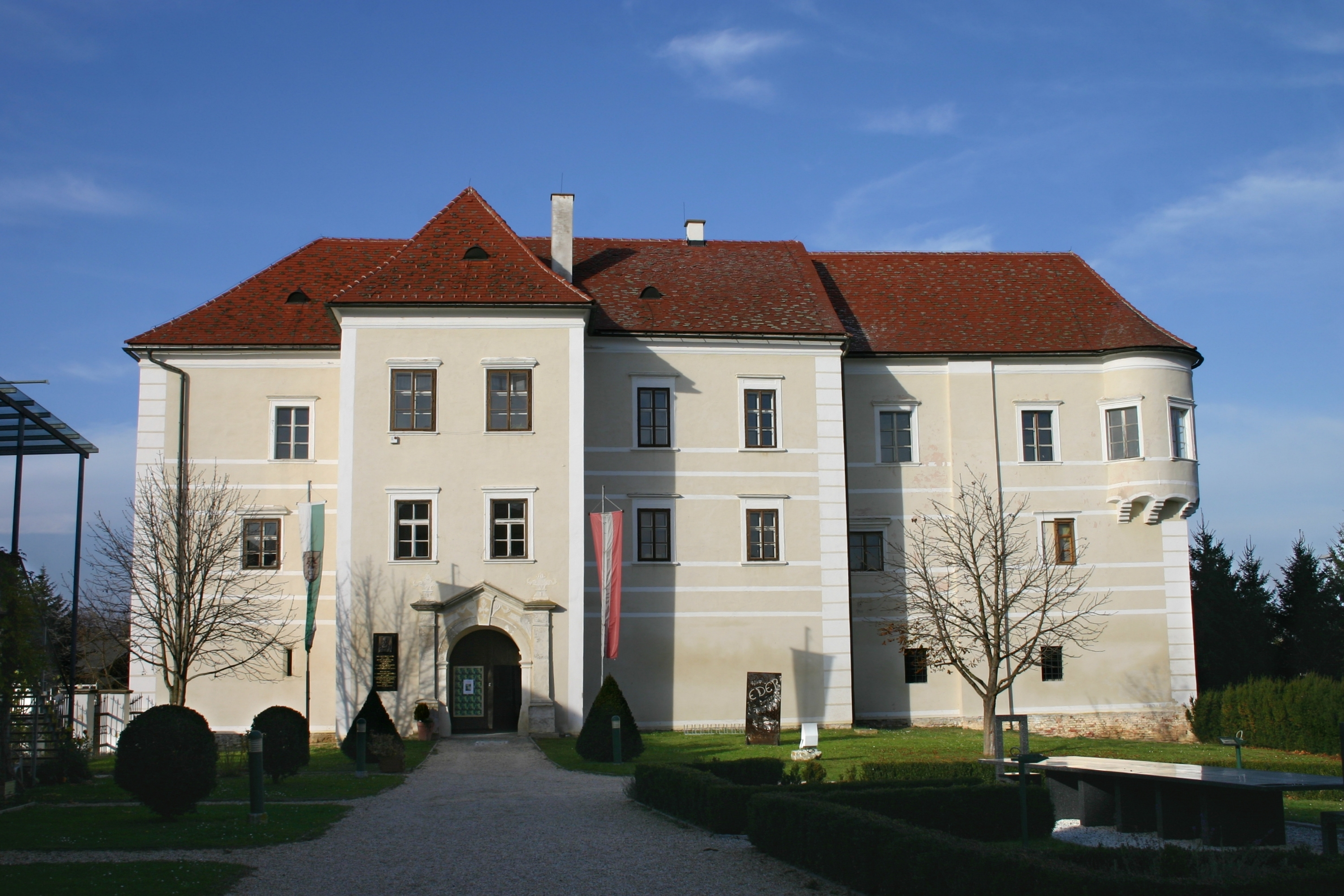
- Burgau Castle

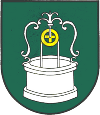
- Coat of arms

- Location within Austria
- Coordinates: 47°09′00″N 16°06′00″E
- Country: Austria
- State: Styria
- District: Hartberg-Fürstenfeld

Government
  - Mayor: Gregor Löffler (ÖVP)

Area
  - Total: 20.01 km^{2} (7.73 sq mi)
- Elevation: 275 m (902 ft)

Population (2018-01-01)
  - Total: 1,040
  - Density: 52.0/km^{2} (135/sq mi)
- Time zone: UTC+1 (CET)
  - Summer (DST): UTC+2 (CEST)
- Postal code: 8291
- Area code: 03383
- Vehicle registration: FF
- Website: burgau.steiermark.at

Burgau (German pronunciation: [ˈbʊʁɡaʊ]) is a municipality in the district of Hartberg-Fürstenfeld in Styria, Austria. It is in the south-east of the country, near the border with Hungary.

== History ==
The castle was originally surrounded by a water trench which gave the name to the village "Burg in der Au" ("Castle in the Meadow"). The fortification was of great strategic importance against ongoing Turkish and Hungarian invasions from the East across the nearby Lafnitz river. The castle was first mentioned in 1367 as a property of the lords of Puchheim. Then the municipality and the castle were given as a feoff to the house of Neitberg before being handed over to Weikhard von Polheim. Thanks to newly built fortifications commanded by Erhard von Polheim, the invading Turks could be defied in the years 1529 and 1532. In the end, the indebted property of Burgau was given to Mathias von Trauttmannsdorff, who oppressed the local population with high socage fees. In 1704, Eastern Styria was heavily devastated by attacking Kuruz, Hungarians rebelling against the Habsburgs. The mayor saved the village by offering weapons and money to the invaders.

In 1753 the Hungarian aristocrat Adam Count Batthyány purchased the property from the Trauttmannsdorff family. The Batthyány family contributed to an economic boom in Burgau. The first cotton spinning mill in the Habsburg monarchy was built in 1789. Two modern spinning machines had been smuggled into the country from England. After the war against France the factories had to be closed but were reopened in 1831 by Viennese merchant Georg Borckenstein. Thus Burgau operated the oldest textile factory in the Danube Monarchy. In 1884 Burgau was connected to the local railway line Bierbaum-Neudau. The last owner of the castle was Count Lajos Batthyány, who was sentenced to death and killed after the 1848 revolutions. In memory of his 150th day of death, a bust and an inscription of Count Batthyány were installed in the courtyard of the castle in 1999.

Today the renovated castle houses the mayor's office, apartments and a café. The festive hall and the arcaded courtyard are used for indoor and outdoor cultural events and annual exhibitions for Christmas and Easter.

== Sights ==
Besides the castle and the water trench, the pilgrim church Maria Gnadenbrunn on a hill is also worth visiting. The first chapel was built in 1418 and destroyed by the Hungarians. The church was rebuilt but heavily damaged by a fire in 1624 and by a thunderstorm in 1775. The building was renovated in 1952. The sculpture on the altar of Virgin Mary holding baby Jesus dates back to the 15th century. The bell was made in 1586. An epitaph of the castle's owner Weikhart von Polheim is also in the church.

On Burgau's main square (Hauptplatz) a golden figure of Virgin Mary stands on a column. It dates back to the year 1750, although a copperplate of the village by Austrian topographer Georg Matthäus Vischer implies that a column must have already been there around 1670. An inscription on the column mentions that a thunderstorm devastated the village and destroyed the Saint Mary sculpture in 1778. Since then Saint Donatus has become the patron saint of Burgau. A procession from the church to the column takes place every second Sunday in July.

The main square also has a stone fountain and a lime tree, which is a protected natural heritage site.

By the Lafnitz river a typical watchtower, a chartaque, was reconstructed as part of the "Kuruzzenwanderweg" ("Kuruz Hiking Trail") in 1995. Such fortifications were used as warning systems along border rivers like the Lafnitz to defend the locals from frequent invasions from the East.
