= Chartaque =

Ottoman watchtower

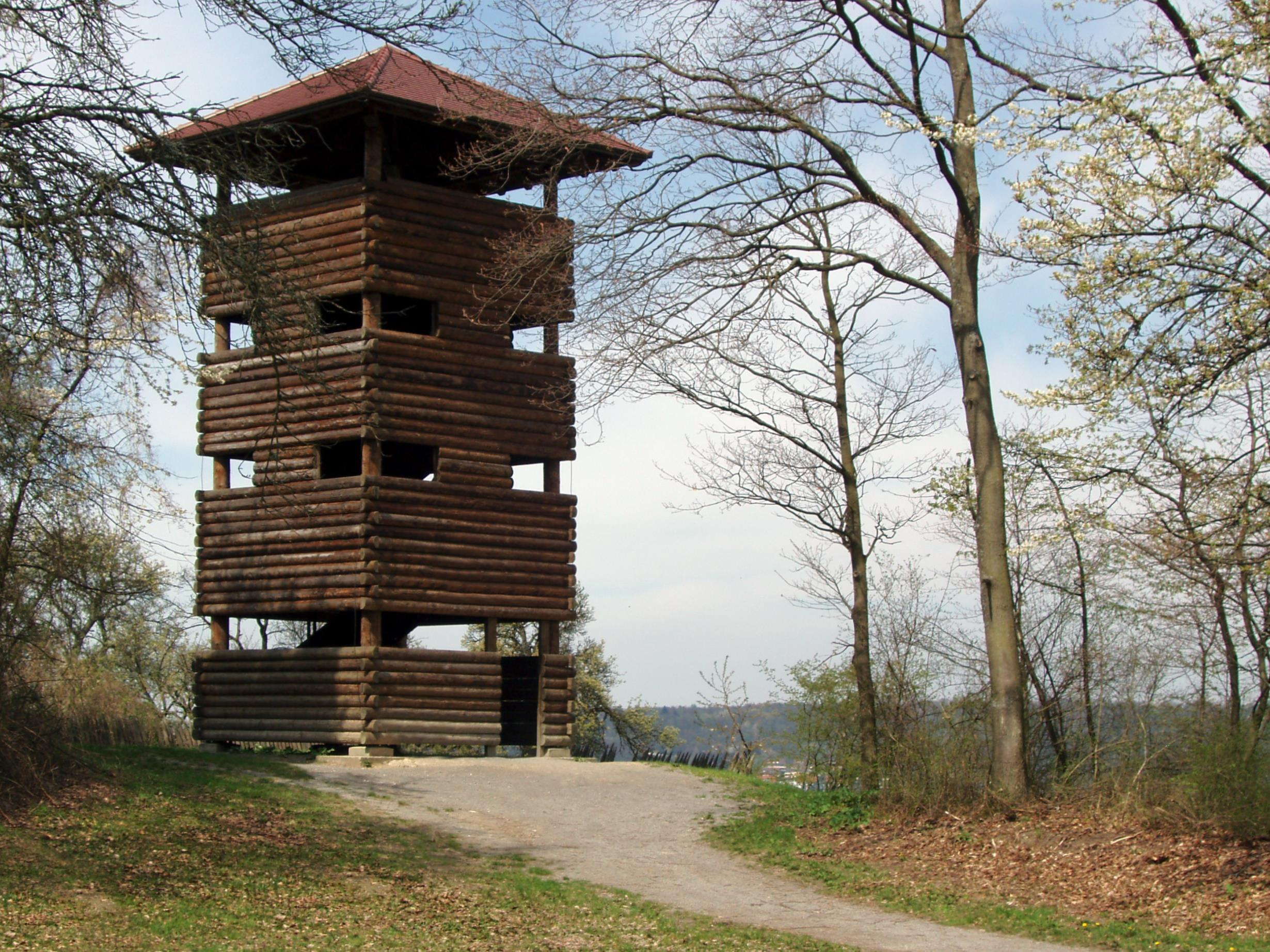
Reconstruction of a chartaque on the Eppingen Lines

A chartaque (Ottoman Turkish: چارطاق, from Persian: چهارتاق chahartaq, literally "having four arches"; in German: Tschartake, in Turkish: Çardak) is a watchtower and important element of the fortification systems in the time of the Ottoman Empire.

== Construction ==
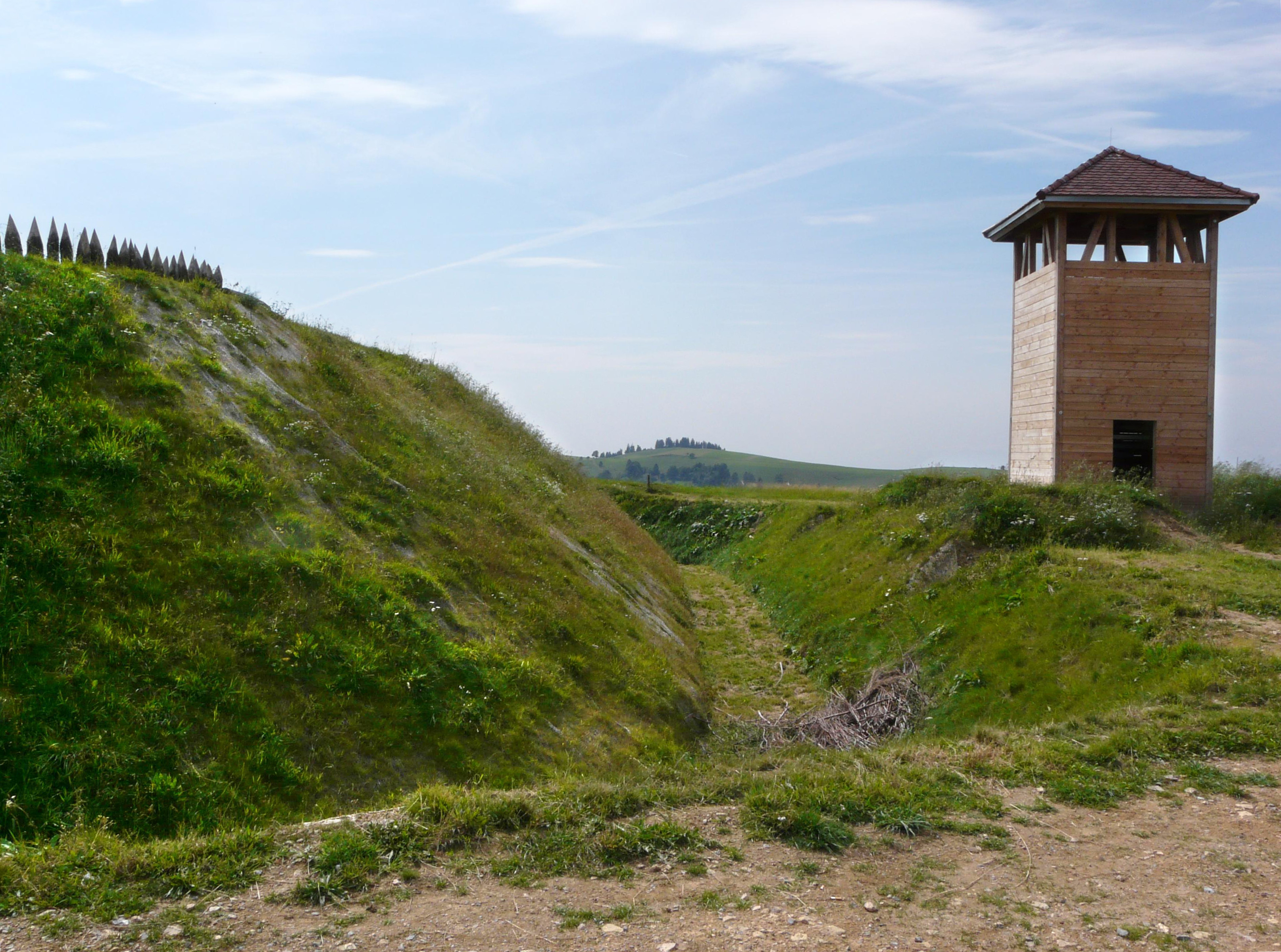
Reconstruction of a schanze and chartaque on the Barocque schanze near Gersbach in the Black Forest area

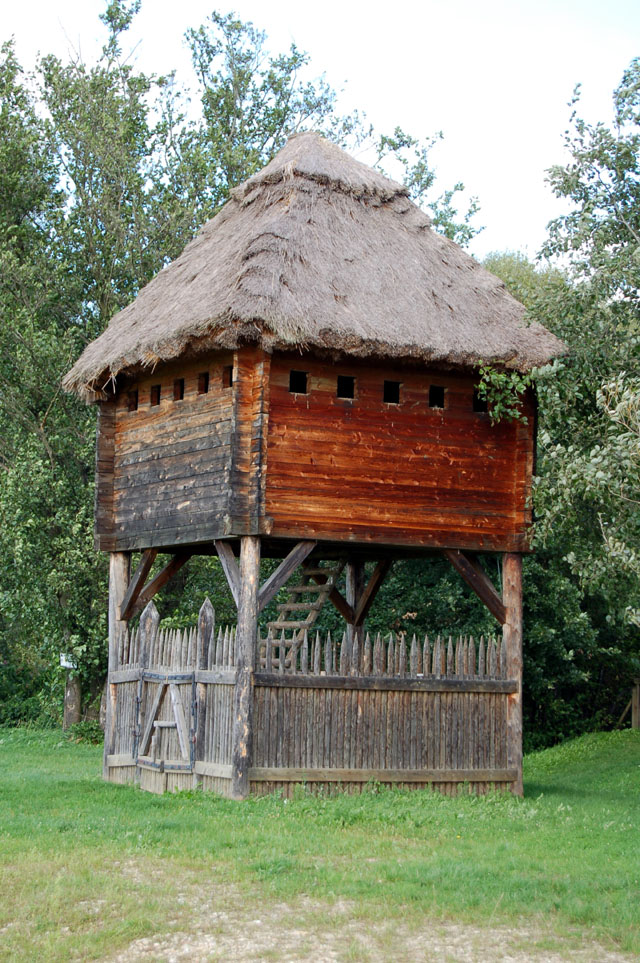
Reconstruction of a chartaque on the Lafnitz, the old border between Styria and Hungary, east of Burgau

The original form, to which the name relates, was built of four logs, but over time chartaques were built in different sizes depending on the number of defending units. Fundamentally they were places of observation and defence. A characteristic structural feature of chartaques is that they consisted of a lookout tower with a palisade around the base. Other defensive works such as schanzen, abatis, ramparts and ditches were often built in the vicinity as additional protection against an enemy.

The construction of a chartaque was an operation that lasted several weeks. In 1706, during the time of the Kuruc wars, precise details are known about the fortifications of the Kuruc schanzen in eastern Styria. For one four-man chartaque, thus a relatively small one (there were also chartaques for up to 20 men), which was to be built in Goritz bei Radkersburg, about three kilometres north of the town of Radkersburg, the following was assessed to be needed: 20 workers (socagers from the surrounding villages), eight log posts each of three fathoms (ca. 18 feet long), 24 logs for beams and wall benches, 18 logs for the upper and lower floors, 25 battens, 75 wide boards, 400 batten nails, 1,000 shingle nails, 67 carts and, as for tradesmen, master carpenter: 18 man days and carpenter's apprentices: 54 man days. Such a chartaque came at a cost of 28 guilders and 24 kreuzer (plus the "free" socage). For two or three chartaques an overseer was appointed in addition to the crews of each chartaque. For the rebuilding of another chartaque which was burned down to its supporting posts, the cost was estimated at 30 guilders. There were also chartaques that were additionally protected by a small redoubt (redutierte Tschartaken), the redoubt costing an estimated 40 guilders. For larger chartaques for 12-15 men, 32 construction-quality logs (Stubenbäume), six rafter logs (Gesparrbäume), four complete trees for the posts, 75 standard boards and 1,500 batten nails were needed.

== History ==
The Ottomans took over these installations from their eastern neighbours, the Persians, who had long been their enemies, and used the idea against their western enemies. Thus chartaques found their way to the Styrian-Hungarian border area and were adopted, in turn, by their opponents.

At first they were built by the Styrians and Lower Austrians as part of their defence against the Ottomans and later strengthened to defend their lands against the Kurucs. Chartaques were usually erected in lines in order to be able to relay warning shots and other visual and audible messages. Depending on the state of the terrain, they might be arranged at intervals of about one to three kilometres. They were supporting elements of defensive lines. For example, between Radkersburg and Fehring, a distance of about 27 kilometres as the crow flies, 13 chartaques were built, and between Fehring and Fürstenfeld from the Raab valley to the Lafnitz valley, a distance of about 15 kilometres, 18-19 chartaques were erected. The description of these military installations has survived to the present day. They were also installed as part of the Baroque lines of fortification in southwest Germany, where they were also called chartaques.

Today only a very few chartaques have survived. In several places, however, they have been faithfully reconstructed. For example, in Burgau in 1995, a chartaque was reconstructed on the Lafnitz, once the border river between Austria and Hungary. Other reconstructions are found on the Eppingen Lines.

== See also ==
- Blockhouse
