= Tappe Mil =

Historic site in Rey, Iran

Coordinates: 35°30′27″N 51°30′03″E

Bahram Fire Temple آتشکده بهرام/تپه میل
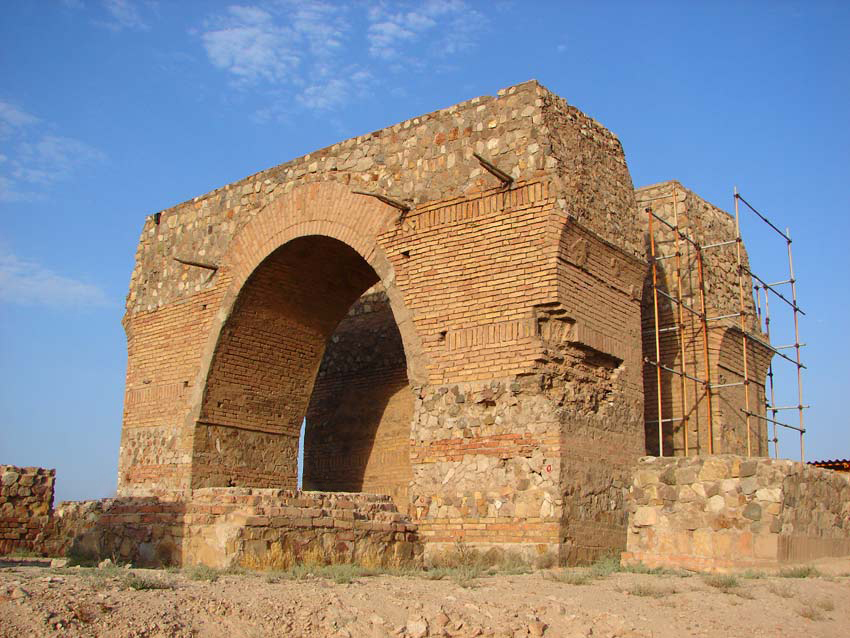

Religion
- Affiliation: Zoroastrianism

Location
- Location: Rey, Tehran province, Iran
- Interactive map of Bahram Fire Temple آتشکده بهرام/تپه میل

Architecture
- Style: Sasanian
- Materials: Stone
- Designated as NHL

Iran National Heritage List
- Official name: Bahram Fire Temple
- Type: Fire Temple
- Designated: 1956
- Reference no.: 407
- Conservation organization: Cultural Heritage, Handicrafts and Tourism Organization of Iran

Tappe Mil (Persian: تپه میل), also known as the Fire Temple of Rey (Persian: آتشکده ری) or the Fire Temple of Bahram (Persian: آتشکده بهرام), is a Sasanian era religious site in Rey, Iran. It is a fire temple named after Bahram V.

== Geographical location ==
About 12 kilometers southeast of the city of Ray towards Varamin, on the top of a wide hill in the city of Ghalenou, there are the remains of a palace or fire temple known as tappe mil "pillar Hill". It is built on two large foundations which resemble Mil from a distance. Mil (Persian: میل) is a word in the Persian language that in architecture refers to a special narrow and tall building common in the past.

== Architecture ==
The direction of the building is east and west, and there was a iwan "porch" (Persian: ایوان) with four circular columns on the east front. A part of the fire temple was destroyed during Alexander's attack on Iran, and only a part of the chahartaq "four-arched" and structure of this fire temple remained in the form of two pillars.

== Excavations and renovation ==
For the first time in 1913, the Frenchman Jacques de Morgan restored this fire temple and the surrounding structures. This building was explored and excavated in 1933 by an American archaeologist named Eric Schmidt, and recently Firouzeh Shibani from Iran followed up its excavation work.

== See also ==
- Verethragna
