= Fire Temple of Amol =

Fire temple in Amol, Iran

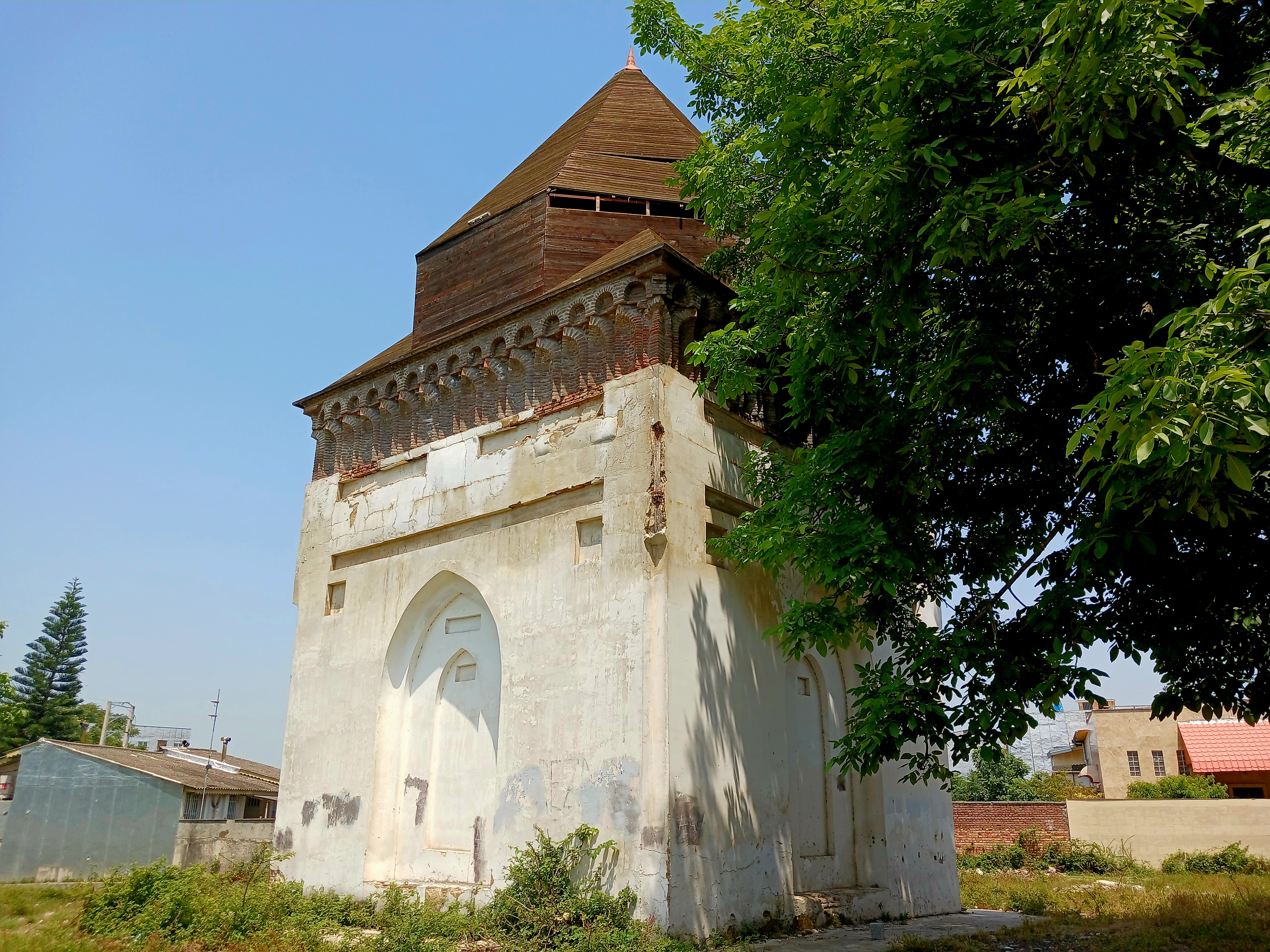

- Location within Iran
- 36°28′53″N 52°21′18″E

Iran National Heritage List
- Official name: Fire Temple of Amol
- Type: Funerary Tower/Fire Temple
- Designated: 1932
- Reference no.: 62
- Conservation organization: Cultural Heritage, Handicrafts and Tourism Organization of Iran

The Fire Temple of Amol (Persian: آتشکده آمل, romanized: Atashkadeh-ye Amol), also known as Shams Tabarsi Amuli, is a fire temple in Amol, Mazandaran province, Iran. It is a Sasanian era (224–651 CE) structure and has been damaged over time.

Muhammad ibn Mahmud Amuli is said to be buried in this place.

== Gallery ==
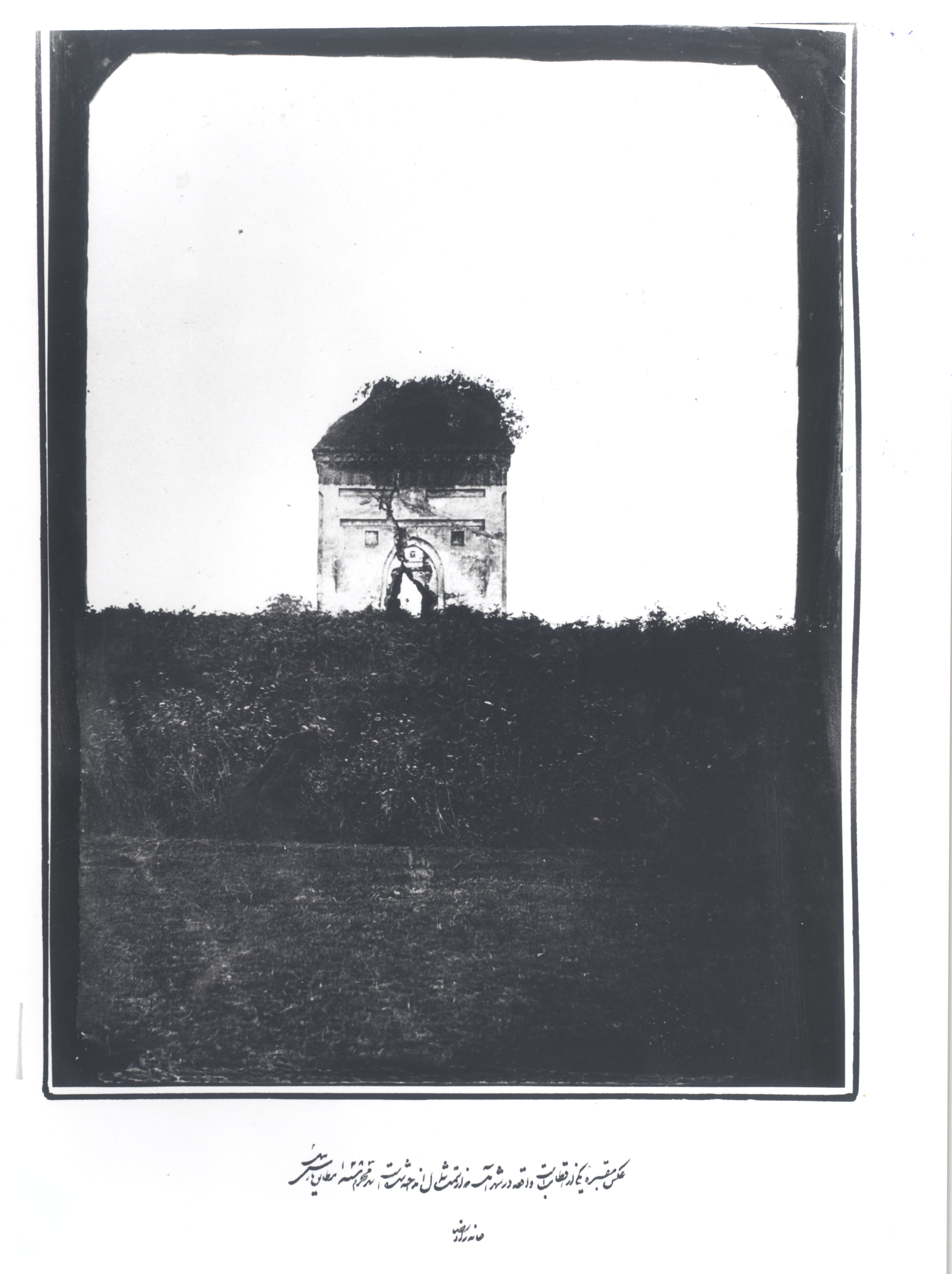
Photograph by Aqa Reza Akasbashi, 1866

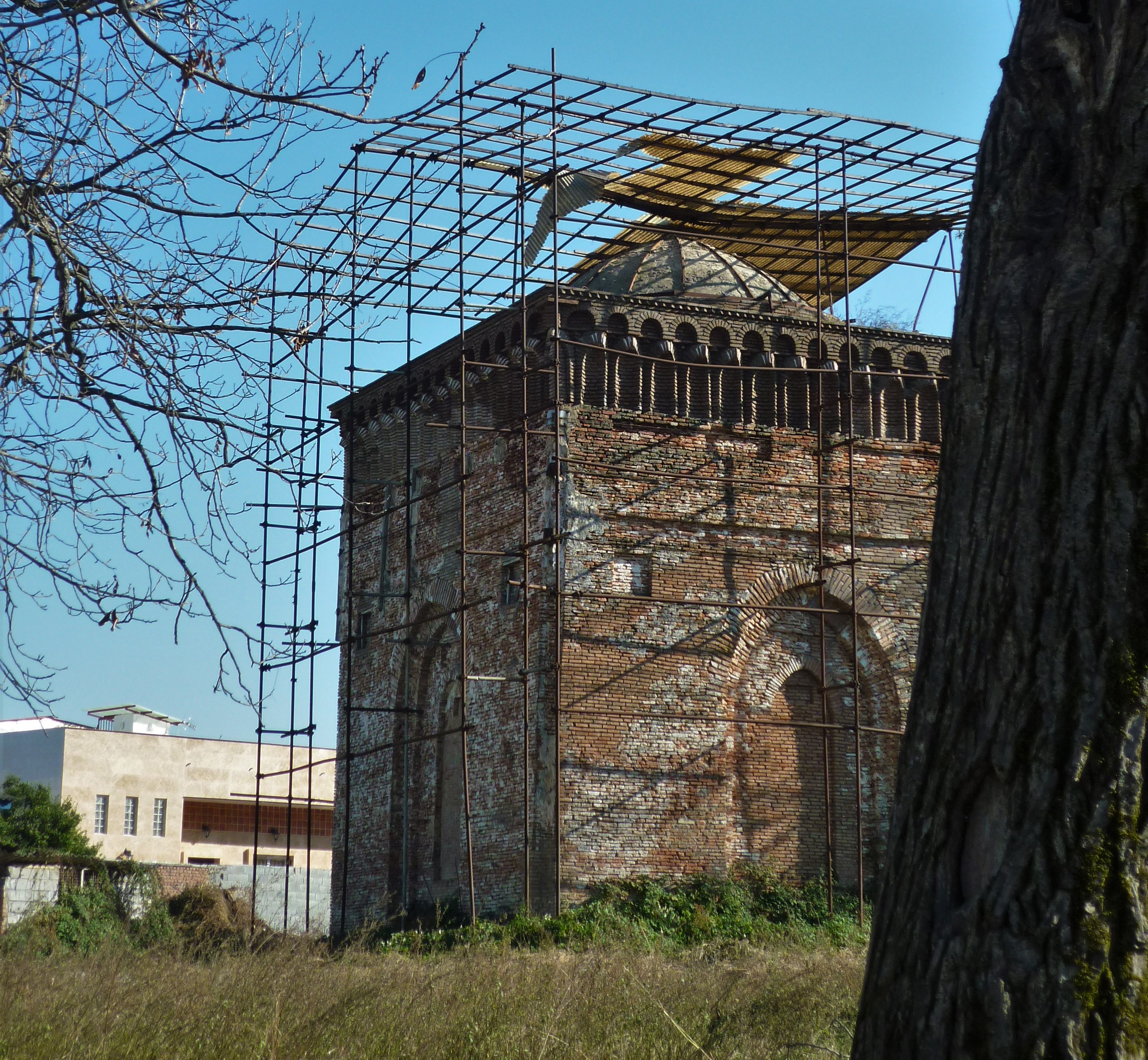
The structure in 2015

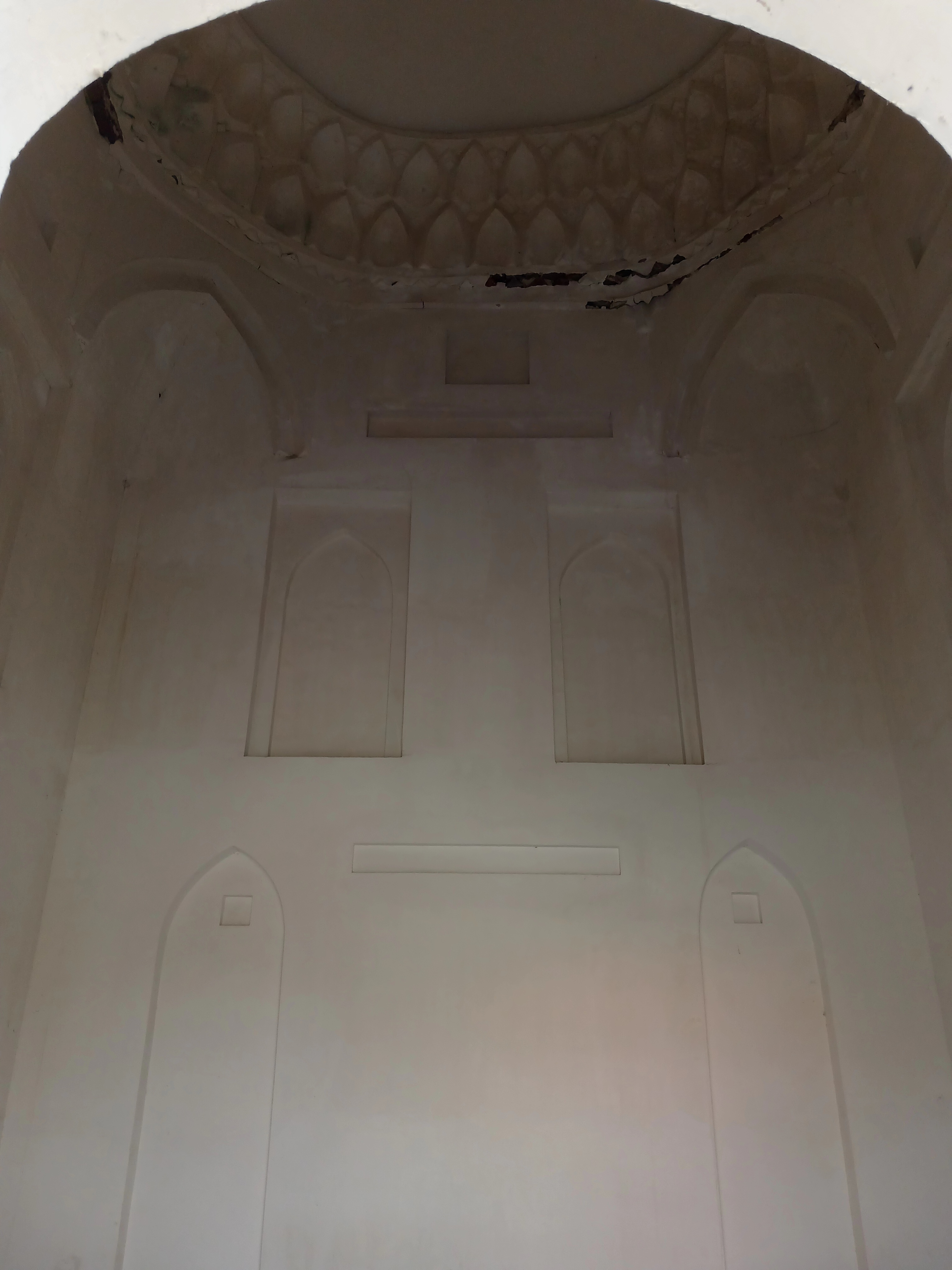
Interior
