= Győr-Moson-Sopron County 4th constituency =

Constituency in Hungary (2012-)

Győr-Moson-Sopron County 4th constituency (Sopron)
- Constituency for the National Assembly
- Location of Győr-Moson-Sopron county 04 within Győr-Moson-Sopron county

- Location of Győr-Moson-Sopron county within Hungary
- County: Győr-Moson-Sopron
- Electorate: 75,464 (2022)
- Major settlements: Sopron

Current constituency
- Created: 2011; 15 years ago
- Party: Tisza Party
- Member: Anikó Hallerné Nagy
- Elected: 2026

The 4th constituency of Győr-Moson-Sopron County (Hungarian: Győr-Moson-Sopron megyei 04. számú országgyűlési egyéni választókerület) is one of the single member constituencies of the National Assembly, the national legislature of Hungary. The constituency standard abbreviation: Győr-Moson-Sopron 04. OEVK.

Since 2026, it has been represented by Anikó Hallerné Nagy of the Tisza Party.

== Geography ==
The 4th constituency is located in western part of Győr-Moson-Sopron County.

=== List of municipalities ===
The constituency includes the following municipalities:

1. Ágfalva
2. Ebergőc
3. Egyházasfalu
4. Fertőboz
5. Fertőd
6. Fertőhomok
7. Fertőrákos
8. Fertőszentmiklós
9. Fertőszéplak
10. Gyalóka
11. Harka
12. Hegykő
13. Hidegség
14. Kópháza
15. Lövő
16. Nagycenk
17. Nagylózs
18. Nemeskér
19. Pereszteg
20. Petőháza
21. Pinnye
22. Répcevis
23. Röjtökmuzsaj
24. Sarród
25. Sopron
26. Sopronhorpács
27. Sopronkövesd
28. Szakony
29. Und
30. Újkér
31. Völcsej
32. Zsira

== Members ==
The constituency was first represented by Mátyás Firtl of the Fidesz from 2014 to 2018. Attila Barcza of the Fidesz was elected in 2018 and he was re-elected in 2018 and he was re-elected in 2022. In the 2026 election, Anikó Hallerné Nagy of the Tisza Party was elected representative.

Election	Member	Party	%	Ref.
2014	Mátyás Firtl	Fidesz	50.58	
2018	Attila Barcza	Fidesz	54.44	
2022	Attila Barcza	Fidesz	57.35	
2026	Anikó Hallerné Nagy	TISZA	52.07	
