= Pannonhalma District =

Pannonhalma District Pannonhalmi járás
- Districts of Hungary
- Coat of arms

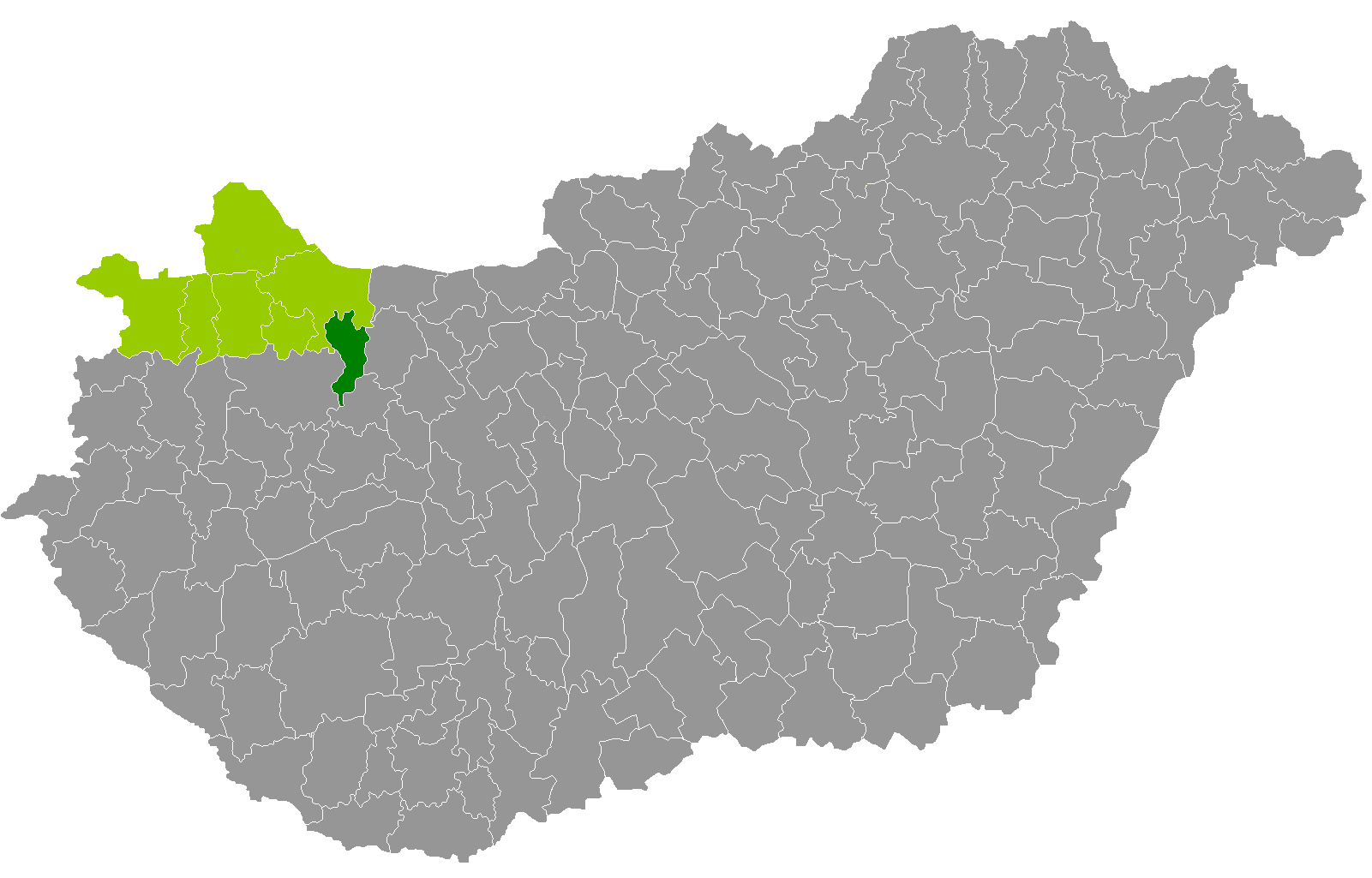
- Pannonhalma District within Hungary and Győr-Moson-Sopron County.
- Coordinates: 47.55°N 17.76°E
- Country: Hungary
- County: Győr-Moson-Sopron
- District seat: Pannonhalma

Area
  - Total: 312.35 km^{2} (120.60 sq mi)
  - Rank: 6th in Győr-Moson-Sopron

Population (2011 census)
  - Total: 15,227
  - Rank: 6th in Győr-Moson-Sopron
  - Density: 49/km^{2} (130/sq mi)

Pannonhalma (Hungarian: Pannonhalmi járás) is a district in south-eastern part of Győr-Moson-Sopron County. Győr is also the name of the town where the district seat is found. The district is located in the Western Transdanubia Statistical Region.

== Geography ==
Pannonhalma District borders with Győr District to the north and west, Kisbér District (Komárom-Esztergom County) to the east, Zirc District (Veszprém County) to the southeast, Pápa District (Veszprém County) to the southwest. The number of the inhabited places in Pannonhalma District is 17.

== Municipalities ==
The district has 1 town and 16 villages. (ordered by population, as of 1 January 2012)

- Bakonygyirót (148)
- Bakonypéterd (279)
- Bakonyszentlászló (1,703)
- Écs (1,809)
- Fenyőfő (107)
- Győrasszonyfa (494)
- Lázi (570)
- Nyalka (461)
- **Pannonhalma** (3,937) – district seat
- Pázmándfalu (973)
- Ravazd (1,210)
- Románd (279)
- Sikátor (291)
- Táp (699)
- Tápszentmiklós (948)
- Tarjánpuszta (385)
- Veszprémvarsány (980)

The bolded municipality is the city.

== Demographics ==
Religion in Pannonhalma District (2011 census)
1. Catholic Church (56.9%)
2. Greek Catholicism (0.20%)
3. Calvinism (7.70%)
4. Lutheranism (3.90%)
5. Other religions (1.00%)
6. Non-religious (5.40%)
7. Atheists (0.40%)
8. Undeclared (24.5%)

In 2011, it had a population of 15,227 and the population density was 49/km^{2}.

Year	County population	Change
2011	15,227	n/a

=== Ethnicity ===
Besides the Hungarian majority, the main minorities are the Roma (approx. 250) and German (200).

Total population (2011 census): 15,227
Ethnic groups (2011 census): Identified themselves: 13,609 persons:

- Hungarians: 13,003 (95.59%)
- Gypsies: 245 (1.80%)
- Germans: 208 (1.53%)
- Others and indefinable: 153 (1.12%)

Approx. 1,500 persons in Pannonhalma District did not declare their ethnic group at the 2011 census.

=== Religion ===
Religious adherence in the county according to 2011 census:

- Catholic – 8,692 (Roman Catholic – 8,656; Greek Catholic – 36);
- Reformed – 1,177;
- Evangelical – 599;
- other religions – 148;
- Non-religious – 826;
- Atheism – 53;
- Undeclared – 3,732.

== See also ==
- List of cities and towns in Hungary
