= Tét District =

Tét District Téti járás
- Districts of Hungary
- Coat of arms

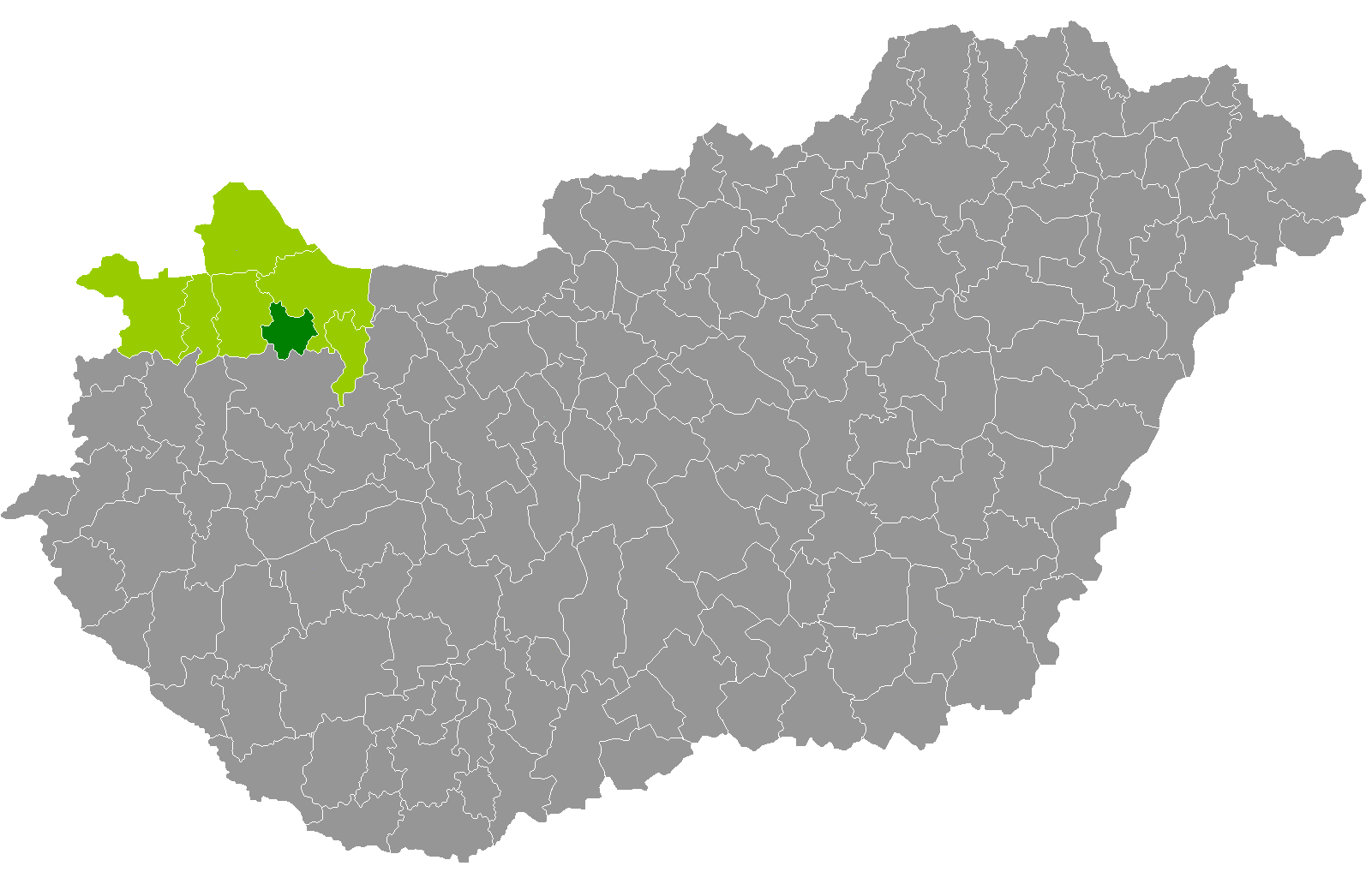
- Tét District within Hungary and Győr-Moson-Sopron County.
- Coordinates: 47.5160°N 17.5166°E
- Country: Hungary
- County: Győr-Moson-Sopron
- District seat: Tét

Area
  - Total: 272.62 km^{2} (105.26 sq mi)
  - Rank: 7th in Győr-Moson-Sopron

Population (2011 census)
  - Total: 14,414
  - Rank: 7th in Győr-Moson-Sopron
  - Density: 52/km^{2} (130/sq mi)

Tét (Hungarian: Téti járás) is a district in southern part of Győr-Moson-Sopron County. Tét is also the name of the town where the district seat is found. The district is located in the Western Transdanubia Statistical Region.

== Geography ==
Tét District borders with Győr District to the north and east, Pápa District (Veszprém County) to the south, Csorna District to the west. The number of the inhabited places in Tét District is 14.

== Municipalities ==
The district has 1 town and 13 villages. (ordered by population, as of 1 January 2012)

- Árpás (245)
- Csikvánd (454)
- Felpéc (847)
- Gyarmat (1,204)
- Gyömöre (1,254)
- Győrszemere (3,209)
- Kisbabot (205)
- Mérges (75)
- Mórichida (807)
- Rábacsécsény (602)
- Rábaszentmihály (479)
- Rábaszentmiklós (127)
- Szerecseny (776)
- **Tét** (3,877) – district seat

The bolded municipality is the city.

== Demographics ==
Religion in Tét District (2011 census)
1. Catholic Church (50.0%)
2. Greek Catholicism (0.10%)
3. Lutheranism (18.3%)
4. Calvinism (3.60%)
5. Other religions (1.00%)
6. Non-religious (5.00%)
7. Atheists (0.30%)
8. Undeclared (21.7%)

In 2011, it had a population of 14,414 and the population density was 53/km².

Year	County population	Change
2011	14,414	n/a

=== Ethnicity ===
Besides the Hungarian majority, the main minorities are the Roma (approx. 300) and German (100).

Total population (2011 census): 14,414
Ethnic groups (2011 census): Identified themselves: 13,319 persons:

- Hungarians: 12,848 (96.46%)
- Gypsies: 264 (1.98%)
- Others and indefinable: 207 (1.55%)

Approx. 1,000 persons in Tét District did not declare their ethnic group at the 2011 census.

=== Religion ===
Religious adherence in the county according to 2011 census:

- Catholic – 7,223 (Roman Catholic – 7,200; Greek Catholic – 19);
- Evangelical – 2,631;
- Reformed – 517;
- other religions – 147;
- Non-religious – 716;
- Atheism – 49;
- Undeclared – 3,131.

== See also ==
- List of cities and towns in Hungary
