= Győr–Moson–Sopron County =

County of Hungary

Coordinates: 47°40′N 17°15′E

Győr–Moson–Sopron County Győr-Moson-Sopron megye
- Counties of Hungary
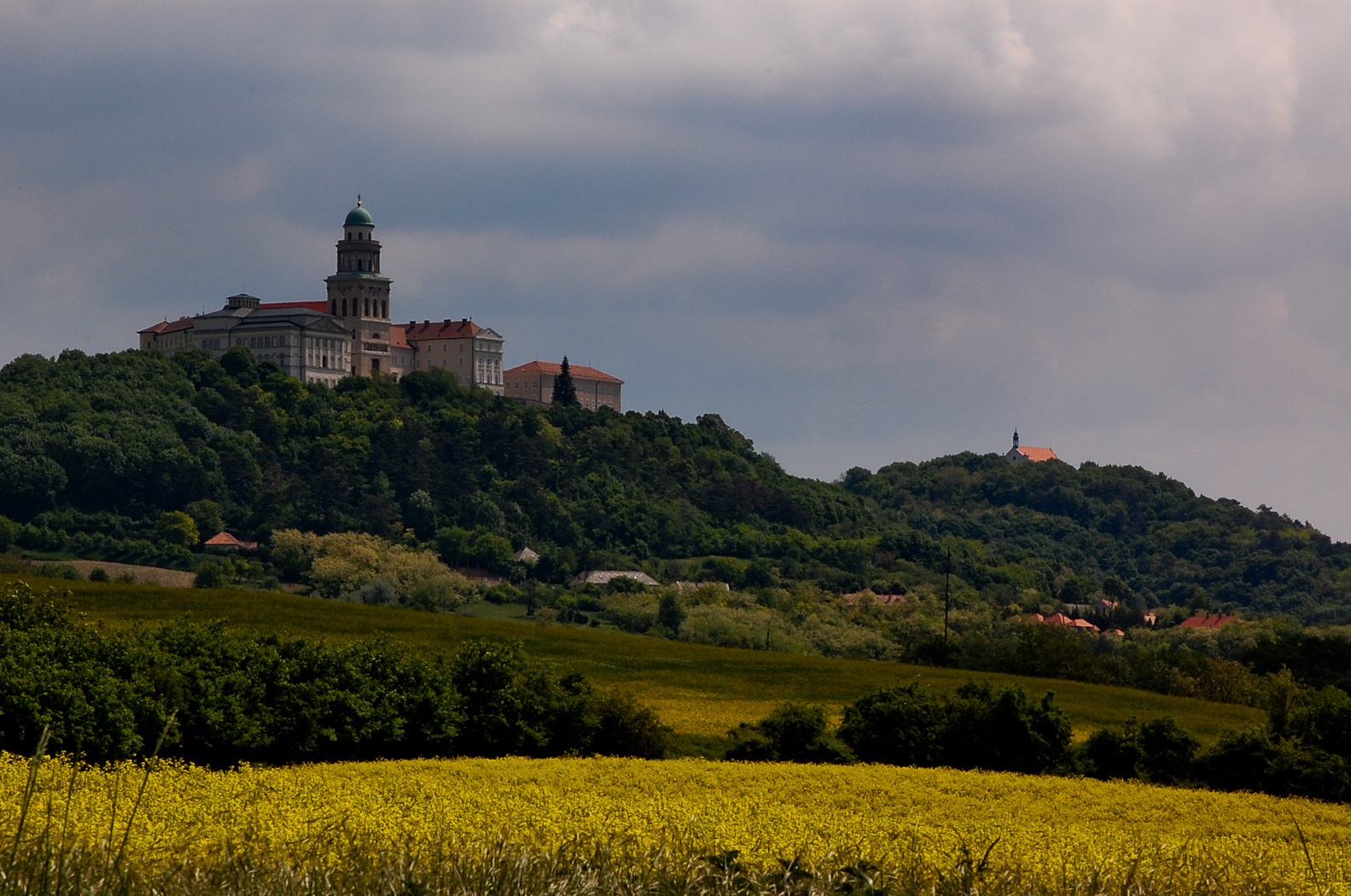
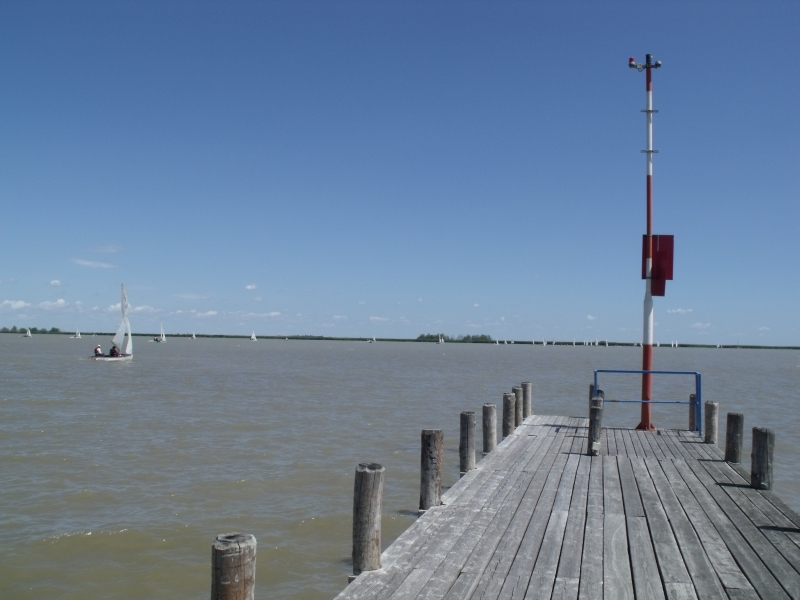
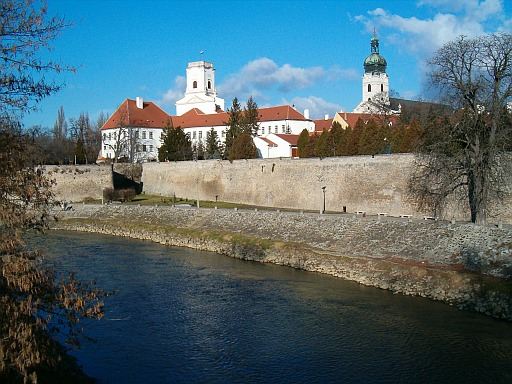
- Descending, from top: Pannonhalma Archabbey, View of Lake Neusiedl in Fertőrákos, and Castle of Győr

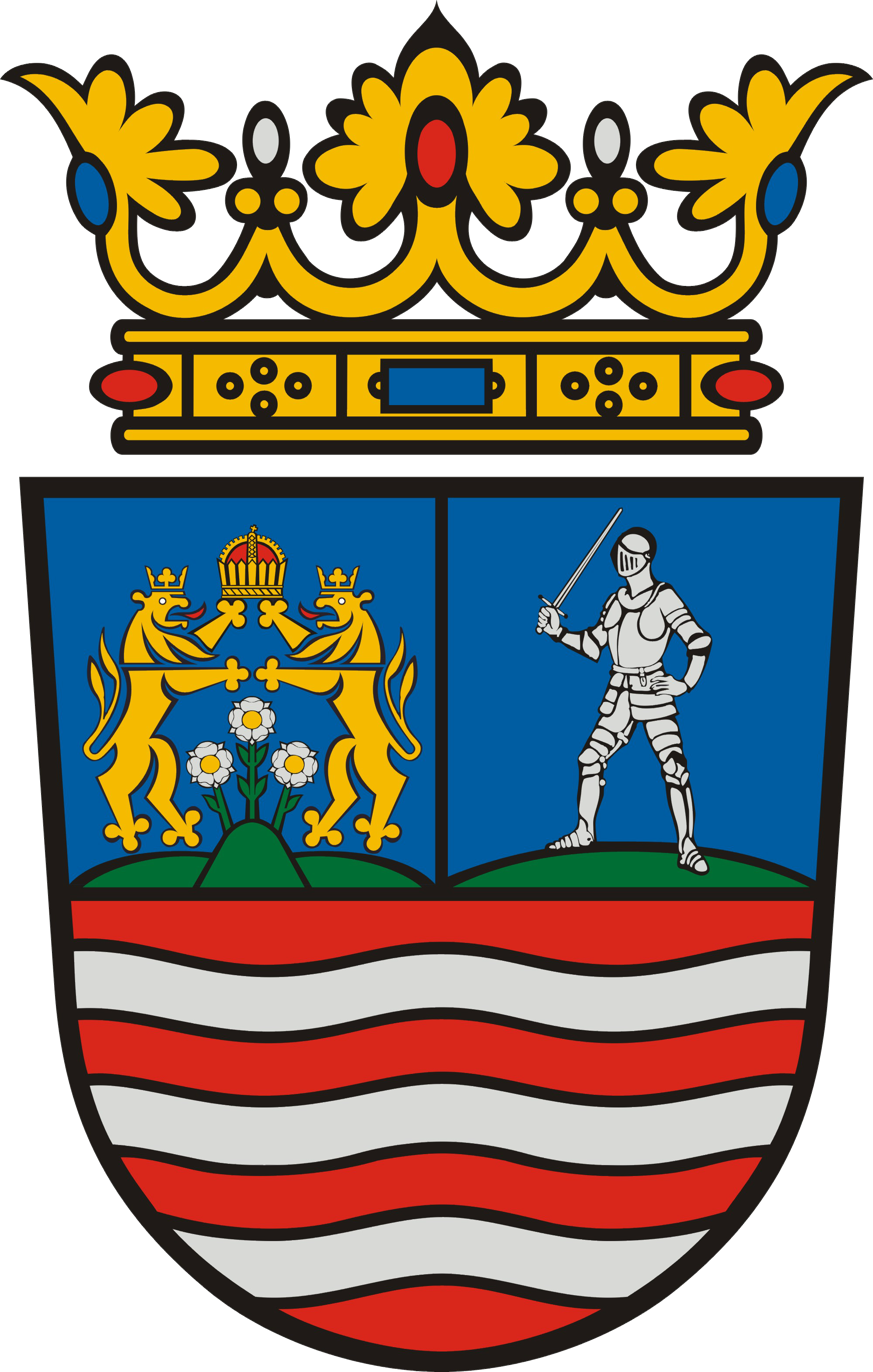
- Flag Coat of arms

- Győr-Moson-Sopron County within Hungary
- Country: Hungary
- Region: Western Transdanubia
- County seat: Győr
- Districts: 7 districts: Csorna District; Győr District; Kapuvár District; Mosonmagyaróvár District; Pannonhalma District; Sopron District; Tét District

Government
  - President of the General Assembly: Zoltán Németh (Fidesz-KDNP)

Area
  - Total: 4,208.05 km^{2} (1,624.74 sq mi)
  - Rank: 13th in Hungary

Population (2018)
  - Total: 461,618
  - Rank: 6th in Hungary
  - Density: 109.699/km^{2} (284.119/sq mi)

GDP
  - Total: HUF 2,236 billion €7.182 billion (2016)
- Postal code: 90xx – 94xx
- Area code(s): (+36) 96, 99
- ISO 3166 code: HU-GS
- Website: gymsmo.hu

Győr–Moson–Sopron (Hungarian: Győr-Moson-Sopron megye, pronounced [ˈɟøːr ˈmoʃon ˈʃopron ˈvaːrmɛɟɛ]; Croatian: Đursko-mošonjsko-šopronska županija; German: Komitat Raab-Wieselburg-Ödenburg) is an administrative county (comitatus or megye) in north-western Hungary, on the border with Slovakia (Bratislava region, Nitra region and Trnava region) and Austria (Burgenland). It shares borders with the Hungarian counties Komárom–Esztergom, Veszprém and Vas. The capital of Győr–Moson–Sopron county is Győr. The county is a part of the Centrope project.

== History ==
Győr–Sopron county was created in 1950 from two counties: Győr–Moson and Sopron. Though formed as a result of the general Communist administrative reform of that year, it is the long-term result of the impact of earlier border changes on Hungary's western counties. In 1921 the counties of Moson and Sopron were each divided in two, with their western districts together forming the northern half of the Austrian province of Burgenland. Between 1921 and 1945, Győr and Moson became part of the "provisionally and administratively unified counties of Győr–Moson–Pozsony", renamed after 1945 as simply Győr-Moson. In 1947 the borders of this county were modified when Hungary lost three villages in the far north of Győr–Moson to Czechoslovakia as a consequence of the Hungarian peace treaty signed in that year. Though Győr is the capital, there is a strong rivalry between it and Sopron, historically an important cultural centre on its own right. The county also contains Hegyeshalom, Hungary's busiest international land border crossing point. In 1990 it was officially renamed to Győr–Moson–Sopron county.

== Demographics ==
Religion in Győr–Moson–Sopron County (2022 census – of those who declared their religion (60.6%))
1. Roman Catholic (66.5%)
2. Lutheran (6.60%)
3. Calvinistic (5.80%)
4. Greek Catholic (0.70%)
5. Other Christian denomination (3.30%)
6. Other religion (0.30%)
7. Not religious (16.8%)

Győr-Moson-Sopron is the only county in Hungary whose population has been increasing according to the Központi Statisztikai Hivatal (KSH). The population density was 111/km^{2} in 2022.

Historical population
Year	Pop.	±%
1870	263,145	—
1880	279,365	+6.2%
1890	294,118	+5.3%
1900	320,355	+8.9%
1910	335,868	+4.8%
1920	355,272	+5.8%
1930	371,825	+4.7%
1941	389,079	+4.6%
1949	374,987	−3.6%
1960	401,861	+7.2%
1970	414,457	+3.1%
1980	437,857	+5.6%
1990	432,126	−1.3%
2001	438,773	+1.5%
2011	447,985	+2.1%
2021	465,945	+4.0%

=== Ethnicity ===
Besides the Hungarian majority, the main minorities are the Germans (approx. 5,000), Roma (3,500), Croats (3,000) and Slovaks (1,500).

Ethnic groups (2011 census):	
Total population	447,985
Identified themselves	395,505
Hungarians	380,282 (96.15%)
Germans	5,145 (1.30%)
Others and undefinable	10,078 (2.55%)
Undeclared	Approx. 63,000

Ethnic composition according to the KSH:

Ethnicity in 2018	% of the county
Hungarians	94%
Germans	3.5%
Romani	0.4%
Others	1.1%

=== Religion ===
Religious adherence in the county according to 2011 census:

Roman Catholic	243,196
Greek Catholic	1,066
Total Catholic	244,355
Evangelical	21,062
Reformed	14,741
Other religions	4,263
Non-religious	41,179
Atheist	4,683
Undeclared	117,702

== Regional structure ==
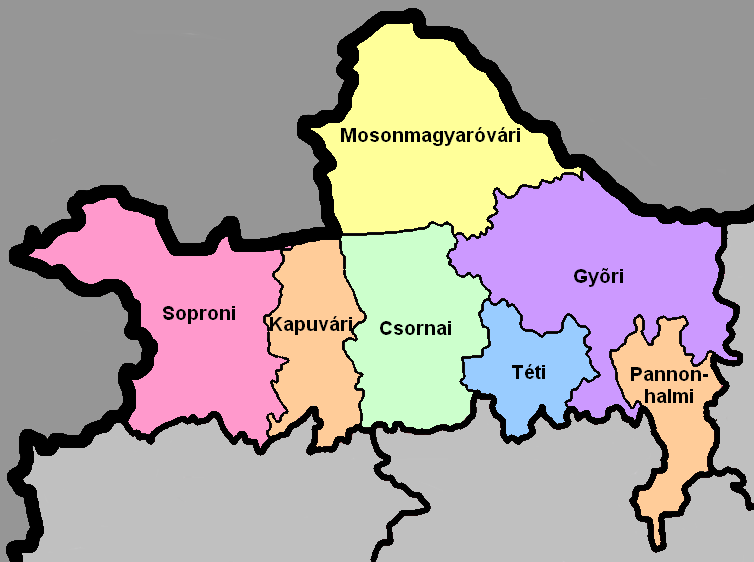
District of Győr–Moson–Sopron County

No.	English and Hungarian names	Area (km^{2})	Population (2011)	Density (pop./km^{2})	Seat	No. of municipalities
1	Csorna District; Csornai járás	579.76	32,970	57	Csorna	33
2	Győr District; Győri járás	903.40	190,146	210	Győr	35
3	Kapuvár District; Kapuvári járás	372.14	23,778	64	Kapuvár	19
4	Mosonmagyaróvár District; Mosonmagyaróvári járás	899.95	72,609	81	Mosonmagyaróvár	26
5	Pannonhalma District; Pannonhalmi járás	312.34	15,227	49	Pannonhalma	17
6	Sopron District; Soproni járás	867.71	98,841	114	Sopron	39
7	Tét District; Téti járás	272.64	14,414	53	Tét	14
Győr-Moson-Sopron County		4,208.05	452,638	109	Győr	183

== Politics ==
=== County Assembly ===
The Győr-Moson-Sopron County Council, elected at the 2014 local government elections, is made up of 21 counselors, with the following party composition:

Party	Seats	Current County Assembly
Fidesz-KDNP	14	
Movement for a Better Hungary (Jobbik)	4	
Hungarian Socialist Party (MSZP)	2	
Democratic Coalition (DK)	1	

==== Presidents of the County Assembly ====
President	Term
Zoltán Németh (Fidesz-KDNP)	2014–

=== Members of the National Assembly ===
The following members elected of the National Assembly during the 2022 parliamentary election:

Constituency	Member	Party
Győr-Moson-Sopron County 1st constituency	Róbert Balázs Simon	Fidesz–KDNP
Győr-Moson-Sopron County 2nd constituency	Ákos Kara	Fidesz–KDNP
Győr-Moson-Sopron County 3rd constituency	Alpár Gyopáros	Fidesz–KDNP
Győr-Moson-Sopron County 4th constituency	Attila Barcza	Fidesz–KDNP
Győr-Moson-Sopron County 5th constituency	István Nagy	Fidesz–KDNP

== Municipalities ==
Győr-Moson-Sopron County has 2 urban counties, 10 towns, 4 large villages and 167 villages.

Cities with county rights

(ordered by population, as of 2011 census)

- Győr (129,527) – county seat
- Sopron (60,548)

Towns

- Mosonmagyaróvár (32,004)
- Csorna (10,558)
- Kapuvár (10,495)
- Jánossomorja (5,921)
- Tét (3,954)
- Fertőszentmiklós (3,818)
- Pannonhalma (3,691)
- Fertőd (3,261)
- Lébény (3,156)
- Beled (2,633)

Villages

- Abda
- Acsalag
- Agyagosszergény
- Ágfalva
- Árpás
- Ásványráró
- Babót
- Bágyogszovát
- Bakonygyirót
- Bakonypéterd
- Bakonyszentlászló
- Barbacs
- Bezenye
- Bezi
- Bodonhely
- Bogyoszló
- Börcs
- Bőny
- Bősárkány
- Cakóháza
- Cirák
- Csáfordjánosfa
- Csapod
- Csér
- Csikvánd
- Darnózseli
- Dénesfa
- Dör
- Dunakiliti
- Dunaremete
- Dunaszeg
- Dunaszentpál
- Dunasziget
- Ebergőc
- Edve
- Egyed
- Egyházasfalu
- Enese
- Écs
- Farád
- Fehértó
- Feketeerdő
- Felpéc
- Fenyőfő
- Fertőboz
- Fertőendréd
- Fertőhomok
- Fertőrákos
- Fertőszéplak
- Gönyű
- Gyalóka
- Gyarmat
- Gyóró
- Gyömöre
- Győrasszonyfa
- Győrság
- Győrladamér
- Győrszemere
- Győrsövényház
- Győrzámoly
- Győrújbarát
- Győrújfalu
- Halászi
- Harka
- Hegyeshalom
- Hegykő
- Hédervár
- Hidegség
- Himod
- Hövej
- Ikrény
- Iván
- Jobaháza
- Kajárpéc
- Károlyháza
- Kimle
- Kisbabot
- Kisbajcs
- Kisbodak
- Kisfalud
- Koroncó
- Kóny
- Kópháza
- Kunsziget
- Lázi
- Levél
- Lipót
- Lövő
- Maglóca
- Magyarkeresztúr
- Máriakálnok
- Markotabödöge
- Mecsér
- Mérges
- Mezőörs
- Mihályi
- Mosonszentmiklós
- Mosonszolnok
- Mórichida
- Nagybajcs
- Nagycenk
- Nagylózs
- Nagyszentjános
- Nemeskér
- Nyalka
- Nyúl
- Osli
- Öttevény
- Páli
- Pásztori
- Pázmándfalu
- Pereszteg
- Petőháza
- Pér
- Pinnye
- Potyond
- Pusztacsalád
- Püski
- Rajka
- Ravazd
- Rábacsanak
- Rábacsécsény
- Rábakecöl
- Rábapatona
- Rábapordány
- Rábasebes
- Rábaszentandrás
- Rábaszentmihály
- Rábaszentmiklós
- Rábatamási
- Rábcakapi
- Répceszemere
- Répcevis
- Rétalap
- Röjtökmuzsaj
- Románd
- Sarród
- Sikátor
- Sobor
- Sokorópátka
- Sopronhorpács
- Sopronkövesd
- Sopronköhida
- Sopronnémeti
- Szakony
- Szany
- Szárföld
- Szerecseny
- Szil
- Szilsárkány
- Táp
- Tápszentmiklós
- Tarjánpuszta
- Tárnokréti
- Tényő
- Töltéstava
- Und
- Újkér
- Újrónafő
- Vadosfa
- Vág
- Vámosszabadi
- Várbalog
- Vásárosfalu
- Veszkény
- Veszprémvarsány
- Vének
- Vitnyéd
- Völcsej
- Zsebeháza
- Zsira

municipalities are large villages.

== Gallery ==
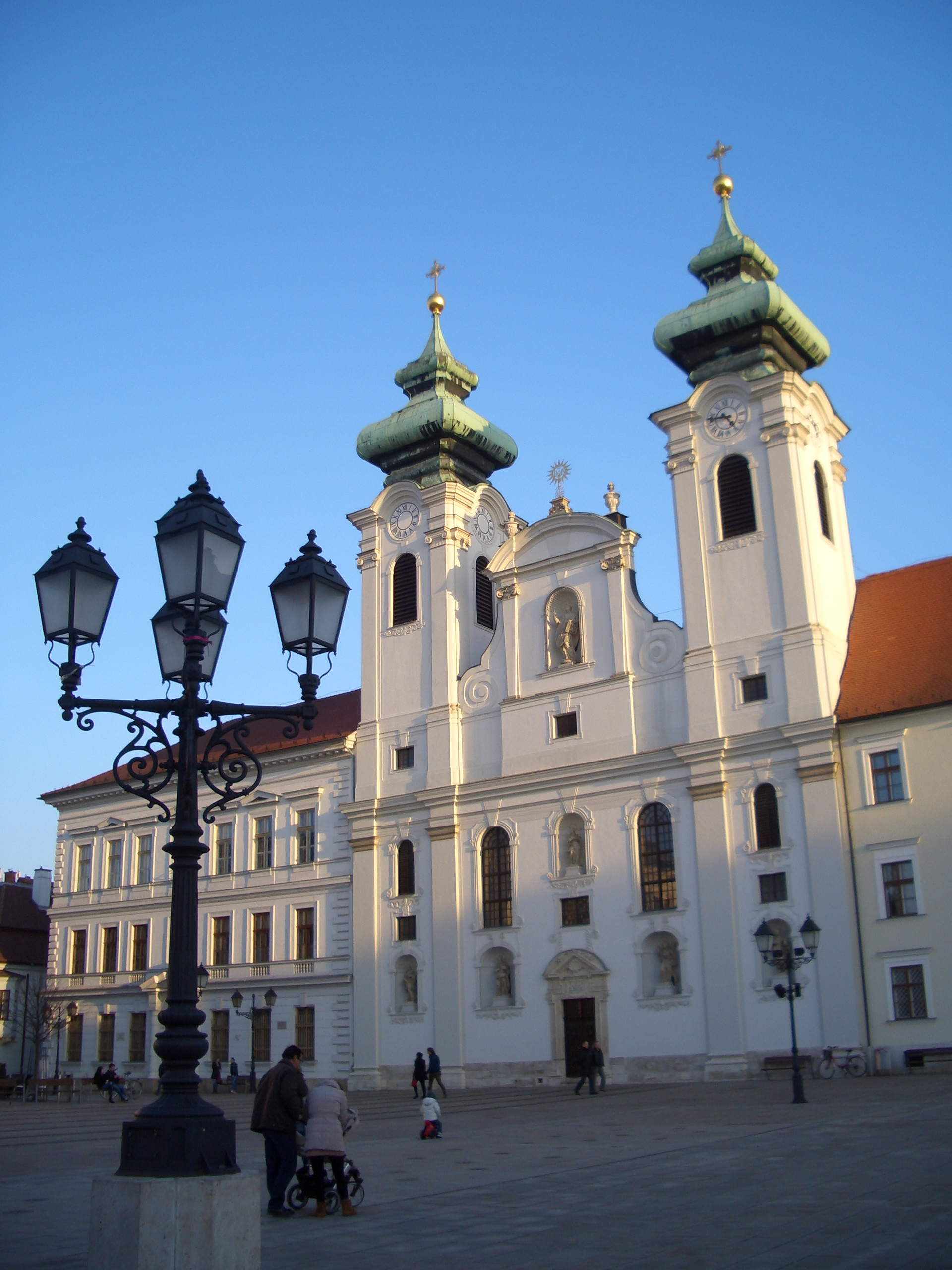
Győr, the capital of the county

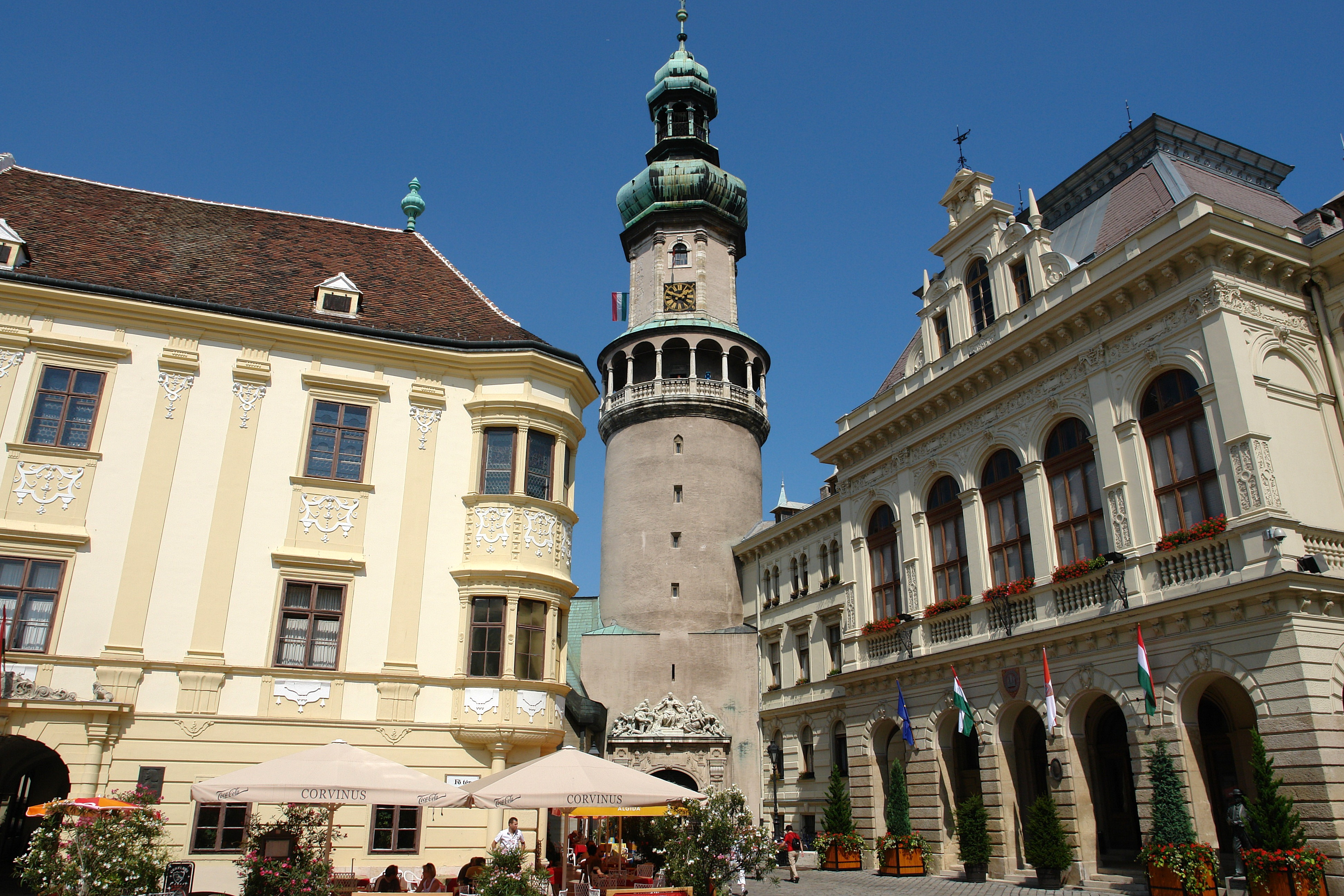
Fire tower in Sopron

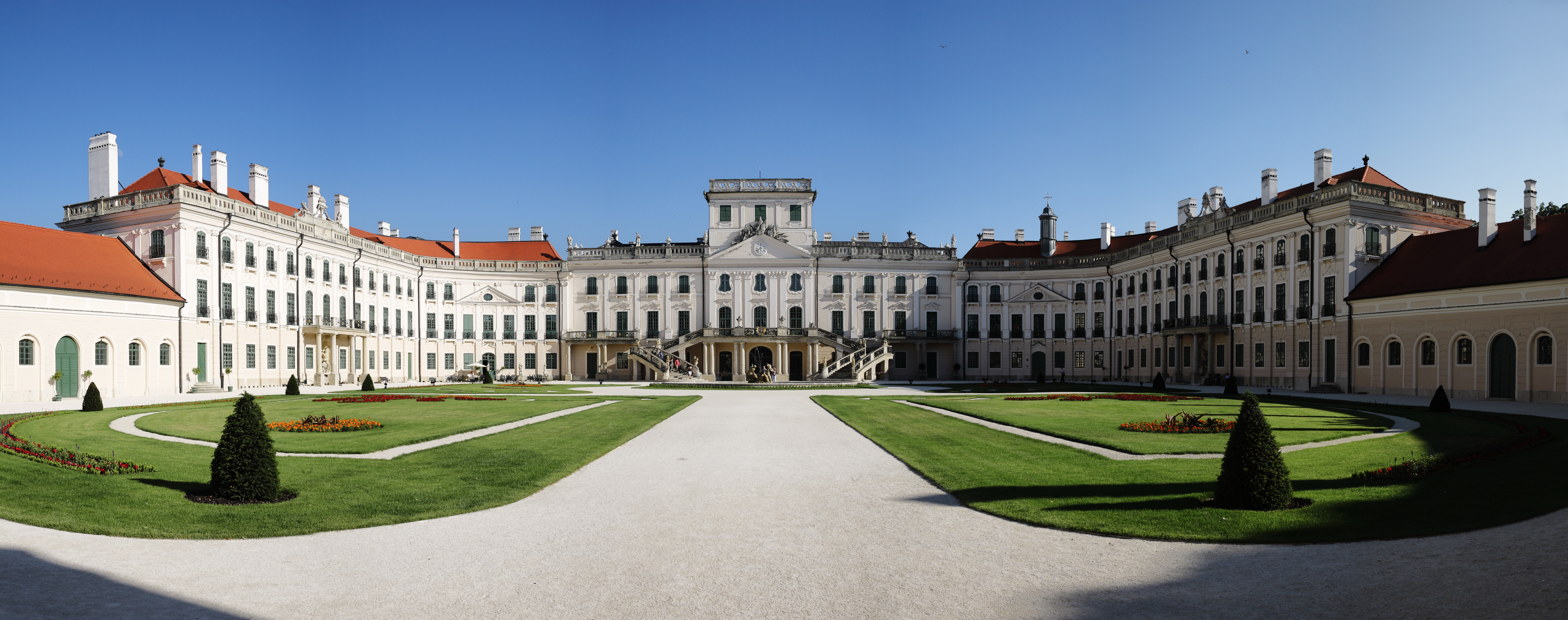
Eszterháza, the Hungarian Versailles

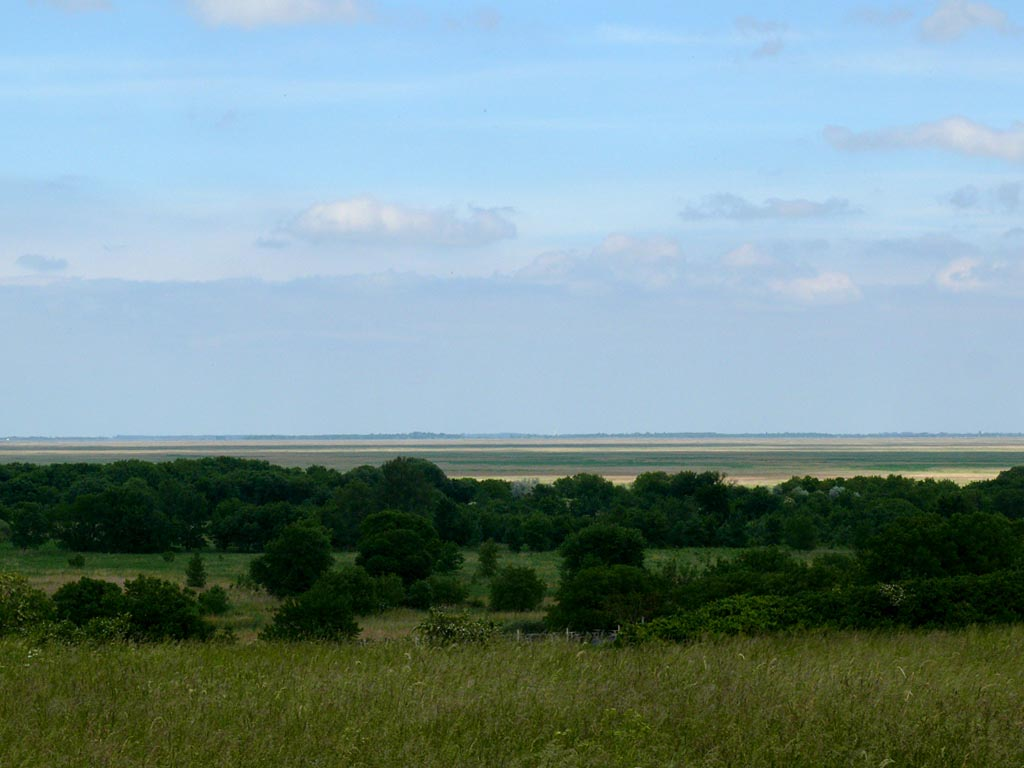
Kisalföld

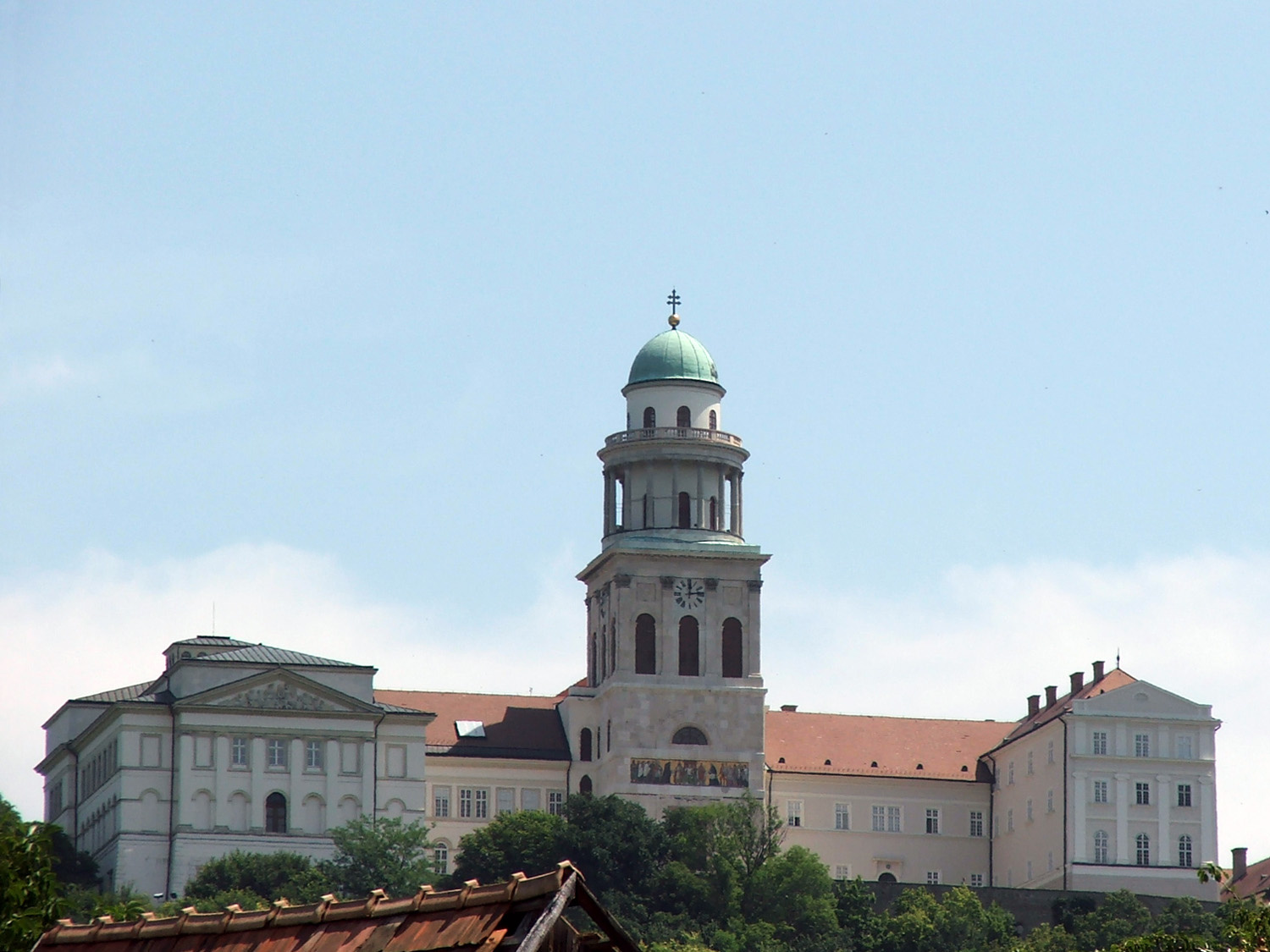
Pannonhalma Archabbey

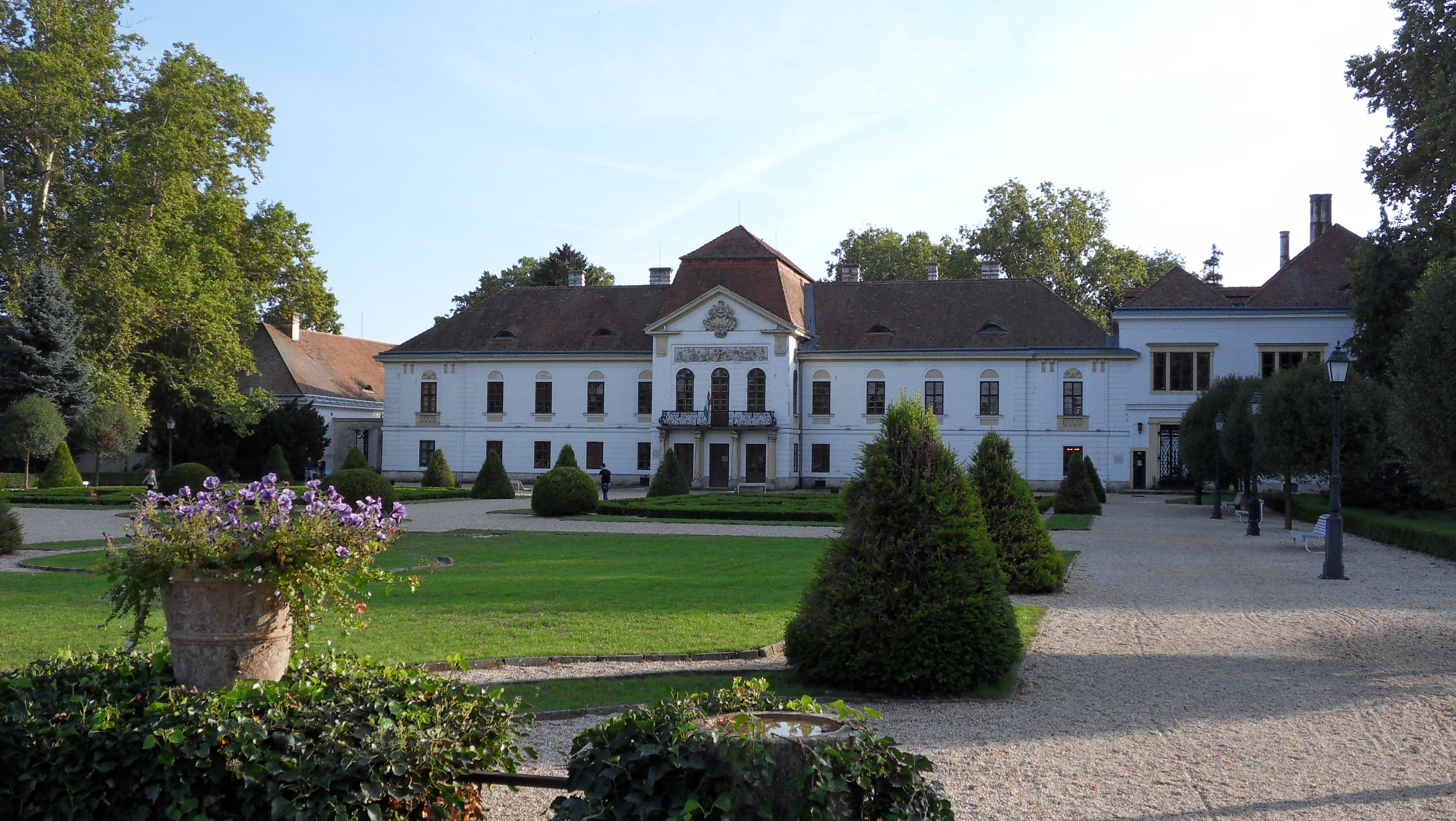
Széchenyi Mansion in Nagycenk

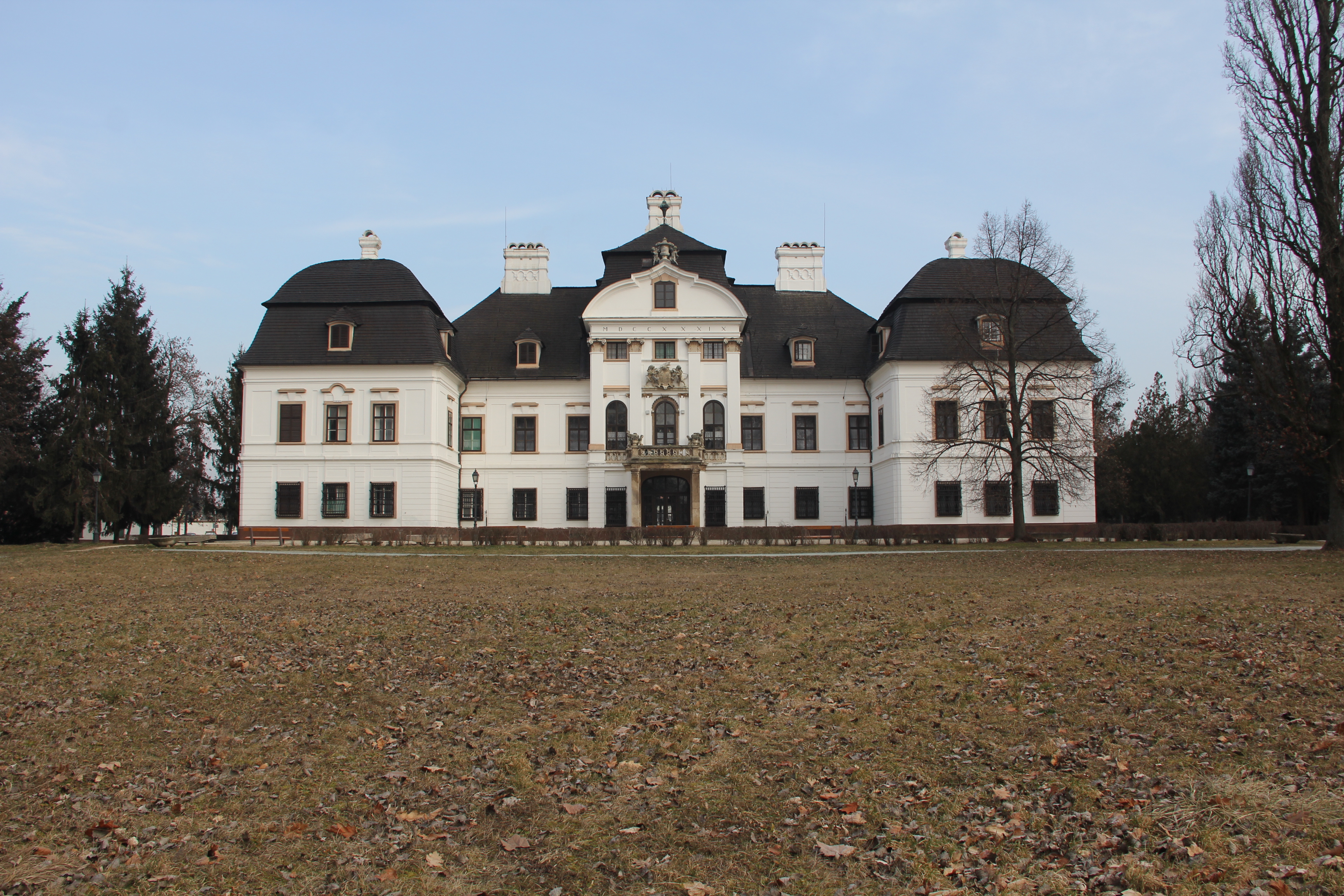
Gyülevizy-Pejacsevich Mansion in Zsira

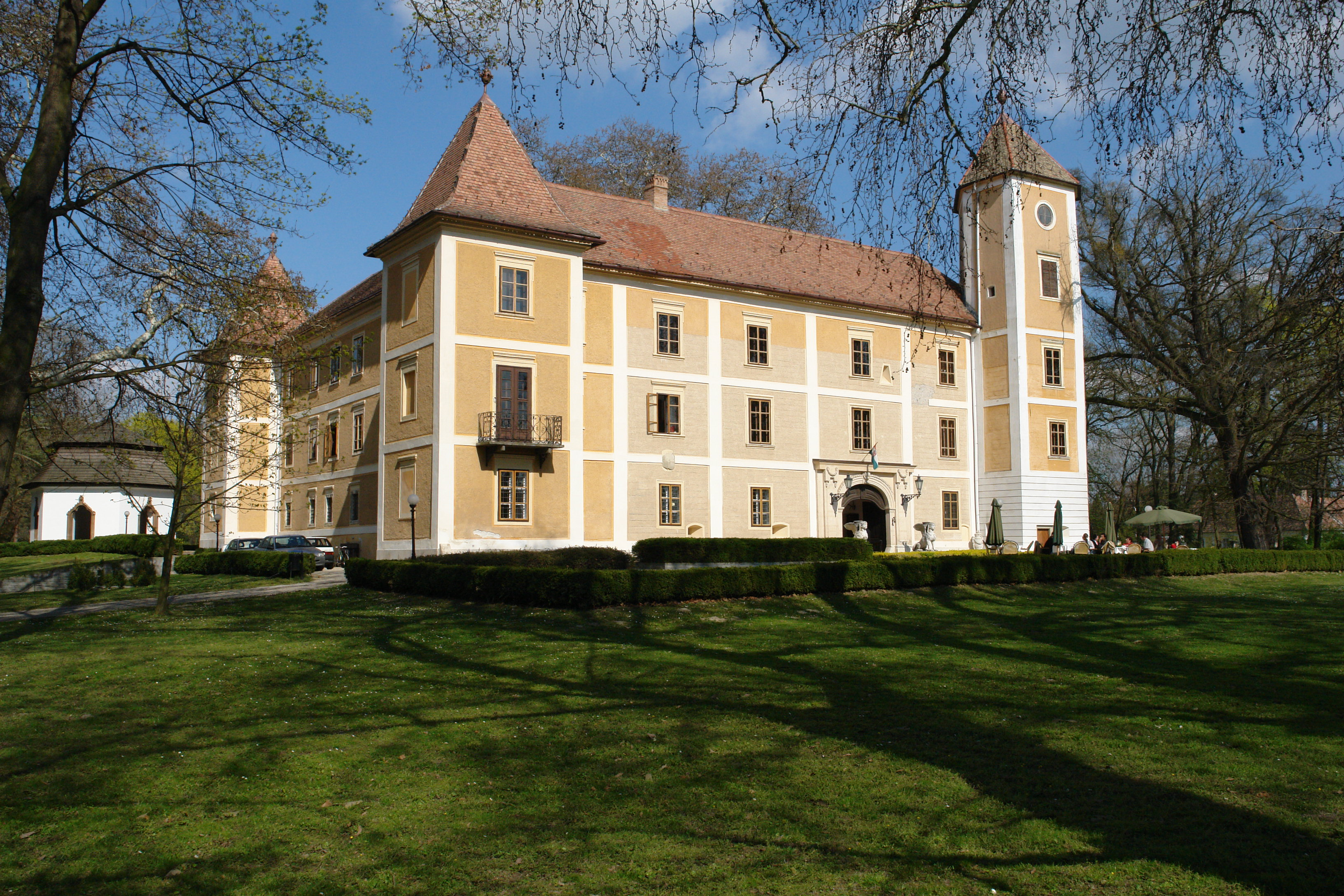
Khuen-Héderváry Mansion in Hédervár

== International relations ==
Győr-Moson-Sopron County has a partnership relationship with:

- Bratislava Region, Slovakia
- Enzkreis, Baden-Württemberg, Germany
- Midtjylland Region, Denmark
- Mureș County, Romania
- Samara Oblast, Russia
- Trnava Region, Slovakia
