= Kimle =

Kimle Kemlja, Kimling
- Flag Coat of arms

- Location of Győr-Moson-Sopron county in Hungary

- Location of Kimle
- Coordinates: 47.82157°N 17.36912°E
- Country: Hungary
- County: Győr-Moson-Sopron

Area
  - Total: 37.27 km^{2} (14.39 sq mi)

Population (2004)
  - Total: 2,259
  - Density: 60.61/km^{2} (157.0/sq mi)
- Time zone: UTC+1 (CET)
  - Summer (DST): UTC+2 (CEST)
- Postal code: 9181
- Area code: 96

Kimle (Croatian: Kemlja; German: Kimling) is a village in Győr-Moson-Sopron County, Hungary.

== Districts ==
- Magyarkimle (Kimling)
- Horvátkimle (Kemlja)
- Károlyháza
- Novákpuszta
