= Töltéstava =

- Village
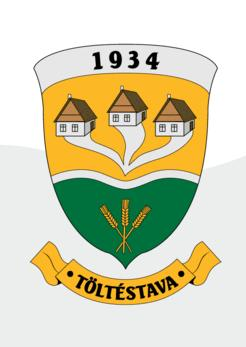
- Coat of arms

- Location of Töltéstava
- Coordinates: 47.6167°N 17.7333°E
- Country: Hungary
- County: Győr-Moson-Sopron

Area
  - Total: 23.17 km^{2} (8.95 sq mi)

Population (2025)
  - Total: 2,554
  - Density: 110.2/km^{2} (285.5/sq mi)
- Time zone: UTC+1 (CET)
  - Summer (DST): UTC+2 (CEST)
- Postal code: 9086
- Motorways: M1
- Distance from Budapest: 119 km (74 mi) East

Töltéstava is a village in Győr-Moson-Sopron County, Hungary.
