= Vadosfa =

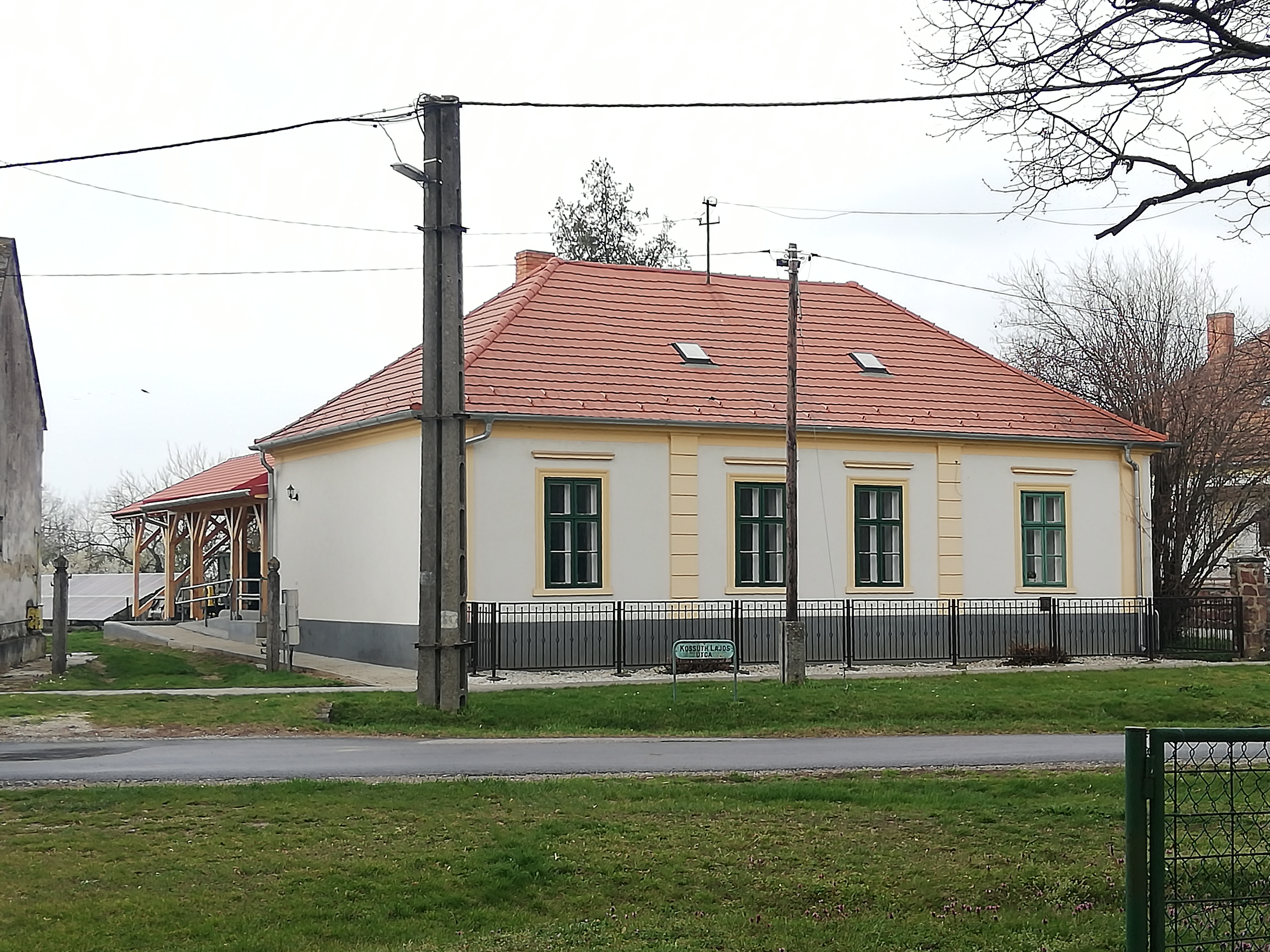
- Village hall

- Flag Coat of arms

- Location of Győr-Moson-Sopron county in Hungary

- Location of Vadosfa
- Coordinates: 47.49910°N 17.12824°E
- Country: Hungary
- County: Győr-Moson-Sopron

Area
  - Total: 4.19 km^{2} (1.62 sq mi)

Population (2004)
  - Total: 85
  - Density: 20.28/km^{2} (52.5/sq mi)
- Time zone: UTC+1 (CET)
  - Summer (DST): UTC+2 (CEST)
- Postal code: 9346
- Area code: 96
- Motorways: M86
- Distance from Budapest: 171 km (106 mi) East

Vadosfa is a village in Győr-Moson-Sopron county, Hungary. It has a railroad station with "Páli-Vadosfa" name. It has two temples, an evangelical and an with name of Saint Stephen.
