= Iván, Hungary =

Iván
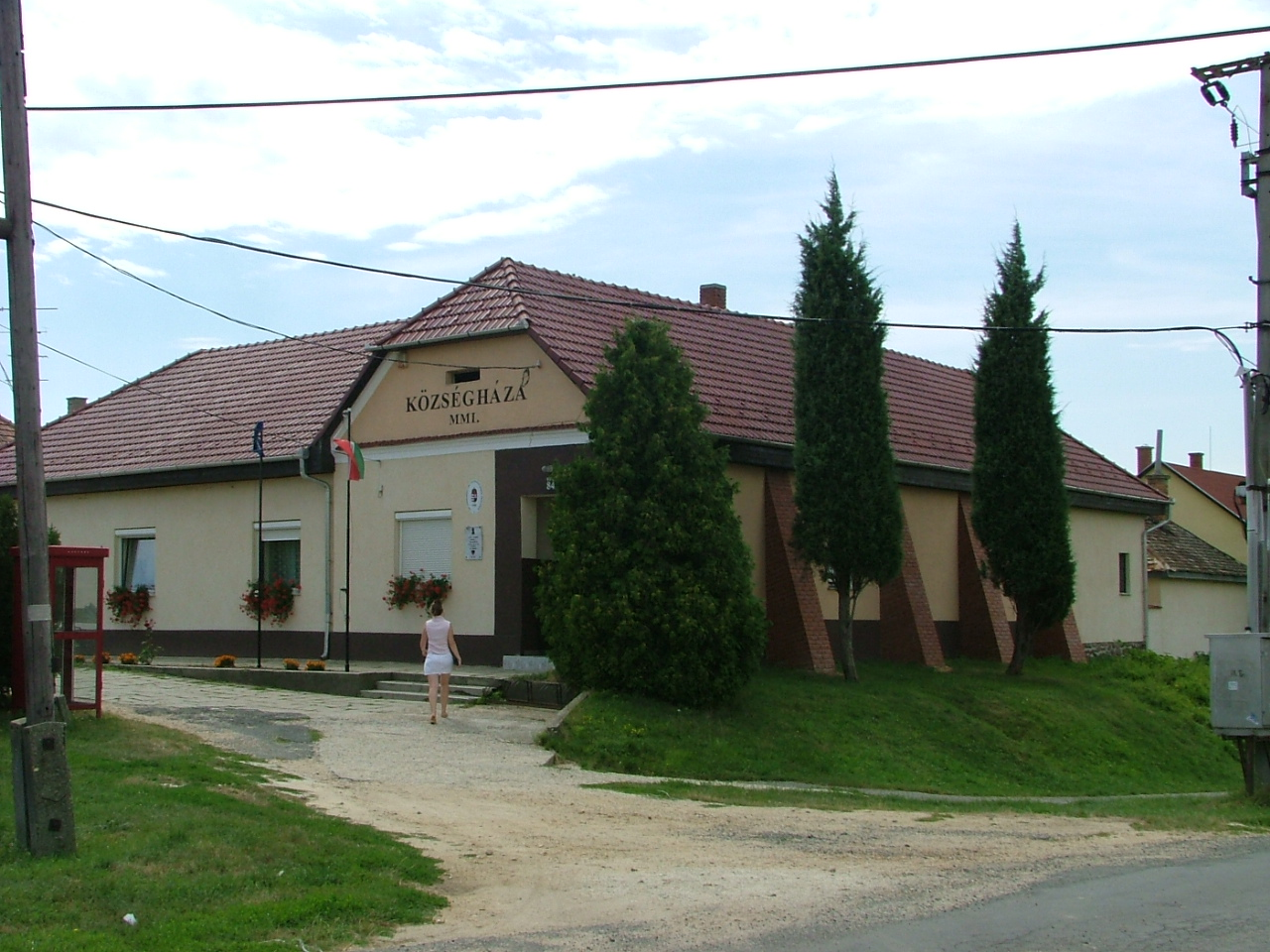
- Village hall

- Flag Coat of arms

- Location of Győr-Moson-Sopron county in Hungary

- Location of Iván
- Coordinates: 47.44633°N 16.91224°E
- Country: Hungary
- County: Győr-Moson-Sopron

Area
  - Total: 54.73 km^{2} (21.13 sq mi)

Population (2004)
  - Total: 1,347
  - Density: 24.61/km^{2} (63.7/sq mi)
- Time zone: UTC+1 (CET)
  - Summer (DST): UTC+2 (CEST)
- Postal code: 9374
- Area code: 99

Iván is a village in Győr-Moson-Sopron county, Hungary.
