= Püski =

- Flag Coat of arms

- Location of Győr-Moson-Sopron county in Hungary

- Location of Püski
- Coordinates: 47.88547°N 17.40696°E
- Country: Hungary
- County: Győr-Moson-Sopron

Area
  - Total: 8.39 km^{2} (3.24 sq mi)

Population (2013)
  - Total: 637
  - Density: 75.92/km^{2} (196.6/sq mi)
- Time zone: UTC+1 (CET)
  - Summer (DST): UTC+2 (CEST)
- Postal code: 9235
- Area code: 96

Püski is a village in Győr-Moson-Sopron county, Hungary.
