= Gyóró =

- Village
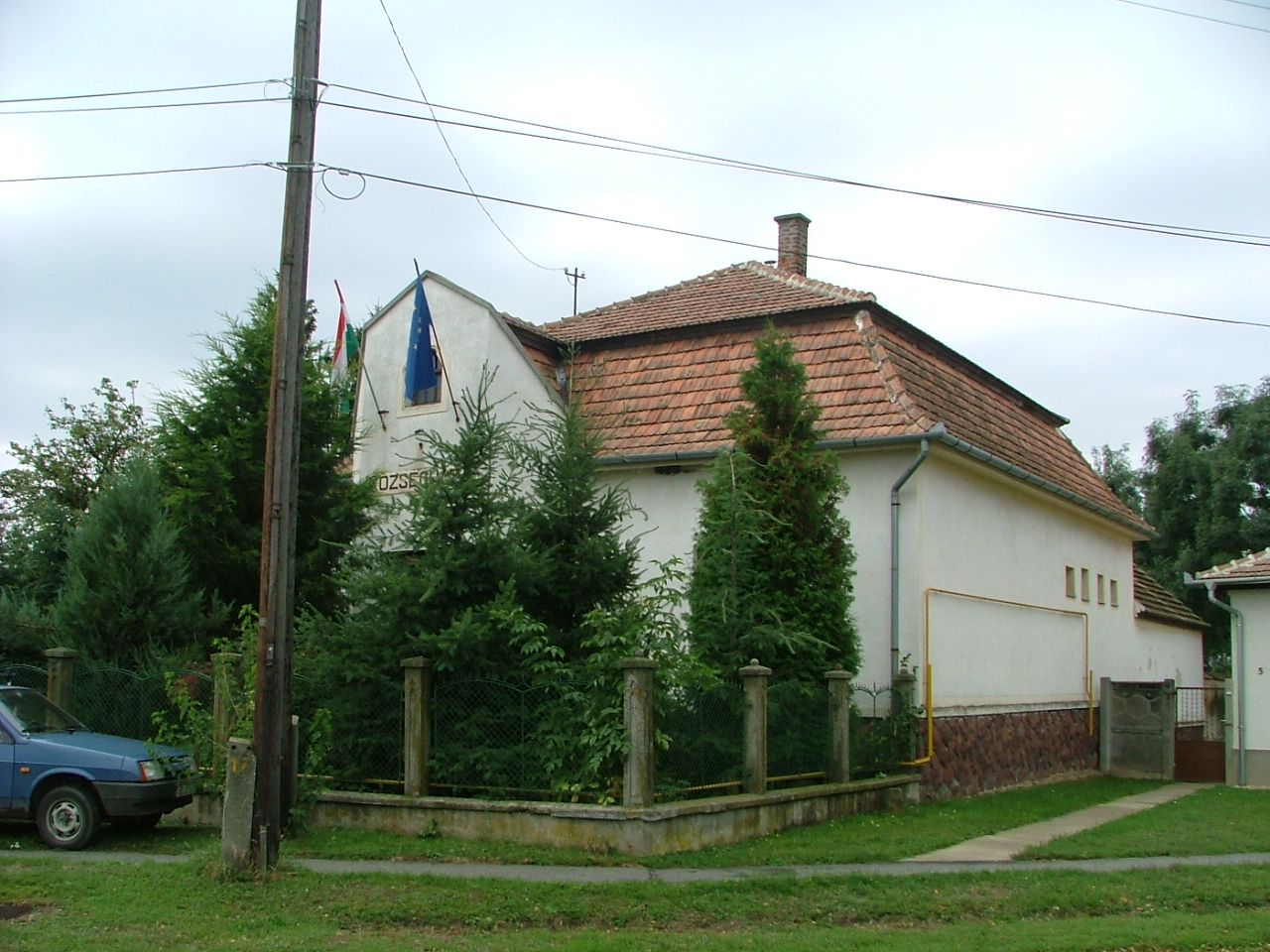
- Village hall

- Coat of arms

- Location of Győr-Moson-Sopron county in Hungary

- Location of Gyóró
- Coordinates: 47.49087°N 17.02531°E
- Country: Hungary
- County: Győr-Moson-Sopron

Area
  - Total: 11.65 km^{2} (4.50 sq mi)

Population (2024)
  - Total: 364
  - Density: 37.93/km^{2} (98.2/sq mi)
- Time zone: UTC+1 (CET)
  - Summer (DST): UTC+2 (CEST)
- Postal code: 9363
- Area code: 96

Gyóró is a village in Győr-Moson-Sopron county, Hungary.
