= Újrónafő =

- Village
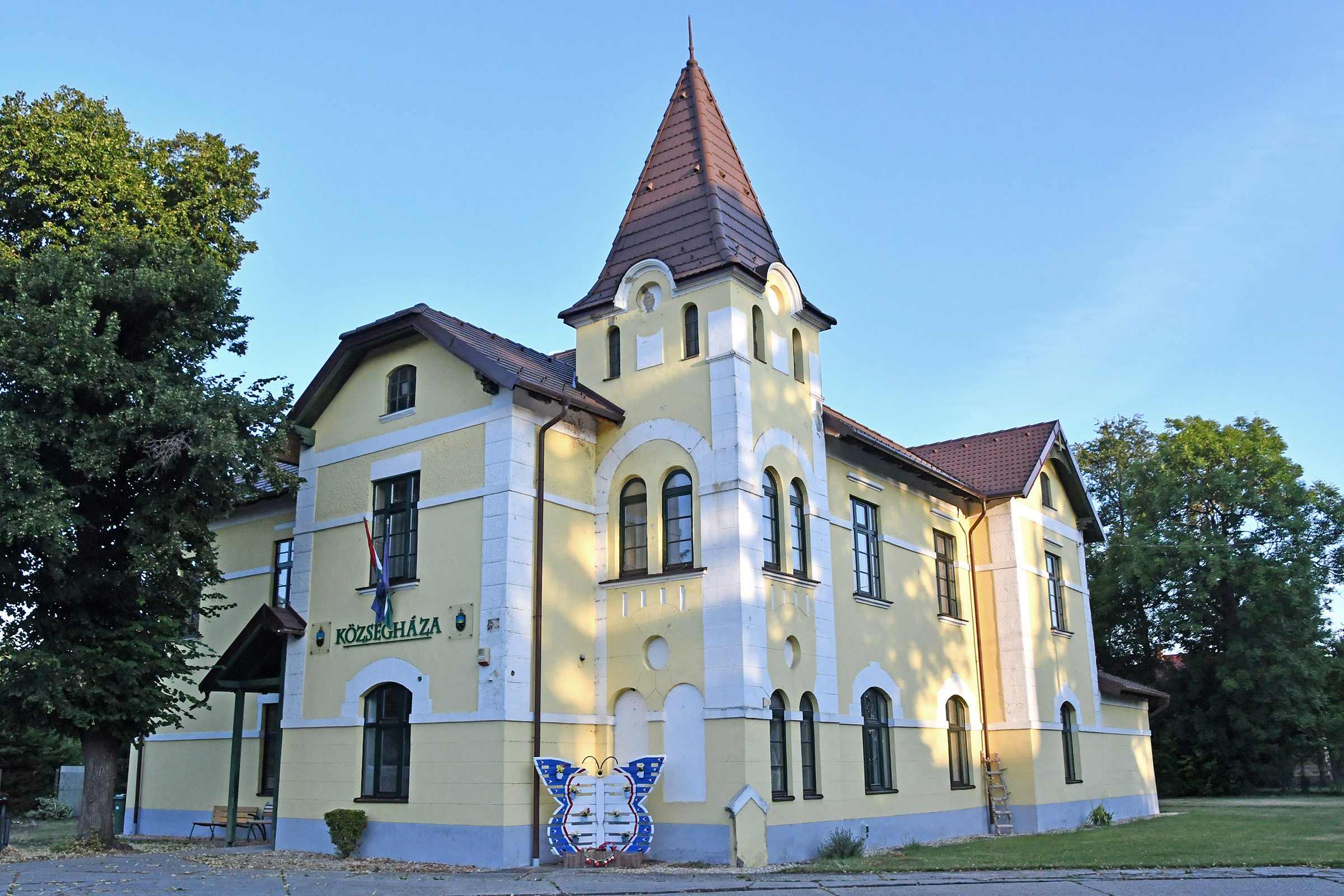
- Town hall

- Coat of arms

- Location of Újrónafő
- Coordinates: 47.809811°N 17.201672°E
- Country: Hungary
- County: Győr-Moson-Sopron

Area
  - Total: 48.63 km^{2} (18.78 sq mi)

Population (2010)
  - Total: 802
- Time zone: UTC+1 (CET)
  - Summer (DST): UTC+2 (CEST)
- Postal code: 9244
- Area code: 96
- Website: http://ujronafo.hu

Újrónafő is a village in Győr-Moson-Sopron County, Hungary.
