= Fertőendréd =

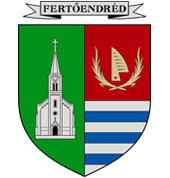
- Coat of arms

- Location of Győr-Moson-Sopron county in Hungary

- Location of Fertőendréd
- Coordinates: 47.60619°N 16.90859°E
- Country: Hungary
- County: Győr-Moson-Sopron

Area
  - Total: 15.1 km^{2} (5.8 sq mi)

Population (2004)
  - Total: 624
  - Density: 41.32/km^{2} (107.0/sq mi)
- Time zone: UTC+1 (CET)
  - Summer (DST): UTC+2 (CEST)
- Postal code: 9442
- Area code: 99

Fertőendréd is a village in Győr-Moson-Sopron county, Hungary.
