= Edve =

- Flag Coat of arms

- Location of Győr-Moson-Sopron county in Hungary

- Location of Edve
- Coordinates: 47.45490°N 17.13360°E
- Country: Hungary
- County: Győr-Moson-Sopron

Area
  - Total: 5.05 km^{2} (1.95 sq mi)

Population (2004)
  - Total: 136
  - Density: 26.93/km^{2} (69.7/sq mi)
- Time zone: UTC+1 (CET)
  - Summer (DST): UTC+2 (CEST)
- Postal code: 9343
- Area code: 96
- Motorways: M86
- Distance from Budapest: 181 km (112 mi) East

Edve is a village in Győr-Moson-Sopron county, Hungary.
