= Himod =

- Flag Coat of arms

- Location of Győr-Moson-Sopron county in Hungary

- Location of Himod
- Coordinates: 47.52009°N 17.00601°E
- Country: Hungary
- County: Győr-Moson-Sopron

Area
  - Total: 22.71 km^{2} (8.77 sq mi)

Population (2004)
  - Total: 694
  - Density: 30.55/km^{2} (79.1/sq mi)
- Time zone: UTC+1 (CET)
  - Summer (DST): UTC+2 (CEST)
- Postal code: 9362
- Area code: 96

Himod is a village in Győr-Moson-Sopron county, Hungary.
