= Kisbodak =

- Flag Coat of arms

- Location of Győr-Moson-Sopron county in Hungary

- Location of Kisbodak
- Coordinates: 47.89673°N 17.41852°E
- Country: Hungary
- County: Győr-Moson-Sopron

Area
  - Total: 9.04 km^{2} (3.49 sq mi)

Population (2004)
  - Total: 385
  - Density: 42.58/km^{2} (110.3/sq mi)
- Time zone: UTC+1 (CET)
  - Summer (DST): UTC+2 (CEST)
- Postal code: 9234
- Area code: 96

Kisbodak is a village in Győr-Moson-Sopron county, Hungary.
