= Agyagosszergény =

- Flag Coat of arms

- Location of Győr-Moson-Sopron county in Hungary

- Location of Agyagosszergény
- Coordinates: 47.60924°N 16.94037°E
- Country: Hungary
- County: Győr-Moson-Sopron

Area
  - Total: 19.9 km^{2} (7.7 sq mi)

Population (2004)
  - Total: 932
  - Density: 46.83/km^{2} (121.3/sq mi)
- Time zone: UTC+1 (CET)
  - Summer (DST): UTC+2 (CEST)
- Postal code: 9441
- Area code: 99

Agyagosszergény is a village in Győr-Moson-Sopron county, Hungary.

It was established when the settlements Agyagos and Fertőszergény were united in 1927 and was initially named Fertőszergényagyagos. The next year, this was changed to Agyagosszergény. The Agyagos place name, recorded as Ogegus in 1256, means 'clayey' and refers to the local soil. Szergény, meanwhile, recorded as Zergen in 1365 and 1366, comes from the Hungarian personal name.
