= Feketeerdő =

- Flag Coat of arms

- Location of Győr-Moson-Sopron county in Hungary

- Location of Feketeerdő
- Coordinates: 47.93533°N 17.27828°E
- Country: Hungary
- County: Győr-Moson-Sopron

Area
  - Total: 6.74 km^{2} (2.60 sq mi)

Population (2004)
  - Total: 433
  - Density: 64.24/km^{2} (166.4/sq mi)
- Time zone: UTC+1 (CET)
  - Summer (DST): UTC+2 (CEST)
- Postal code: 9211
- Area code: 96

Feketeerdő (German: Schwarzwald) is a village in Győr-Moson-Sopron county, Hungary. It lies near Mosonmagyaróvár and is close to both the Austrian and Slovak borders.
