= Csáfordjánosfa =

- Flag Coat of arms

- Location of Győr-Moson-Sopron county in Hungary

- Location of Csáfordjánosfa
- Coordinates: 47.41594°N 16.95043°E
- Country: Hungary
- County: Győr-Moson-Sopron

Area
  - Total: 5.28 km^{2} (2.04 sq mi)

Population (2004)
  - Total: 244
  - Density: 46.21/km^{2} (119.7/sq mi)
- Time zone: UTC+1 (CET)
  - Summer (DST): UTC+2 (CEST)
- Postal code: 9375
- Area code: 99

Csáfordjánosfa is a village in Győr-Moson-Sopron county, Hungary.
