= Győrújbarát =

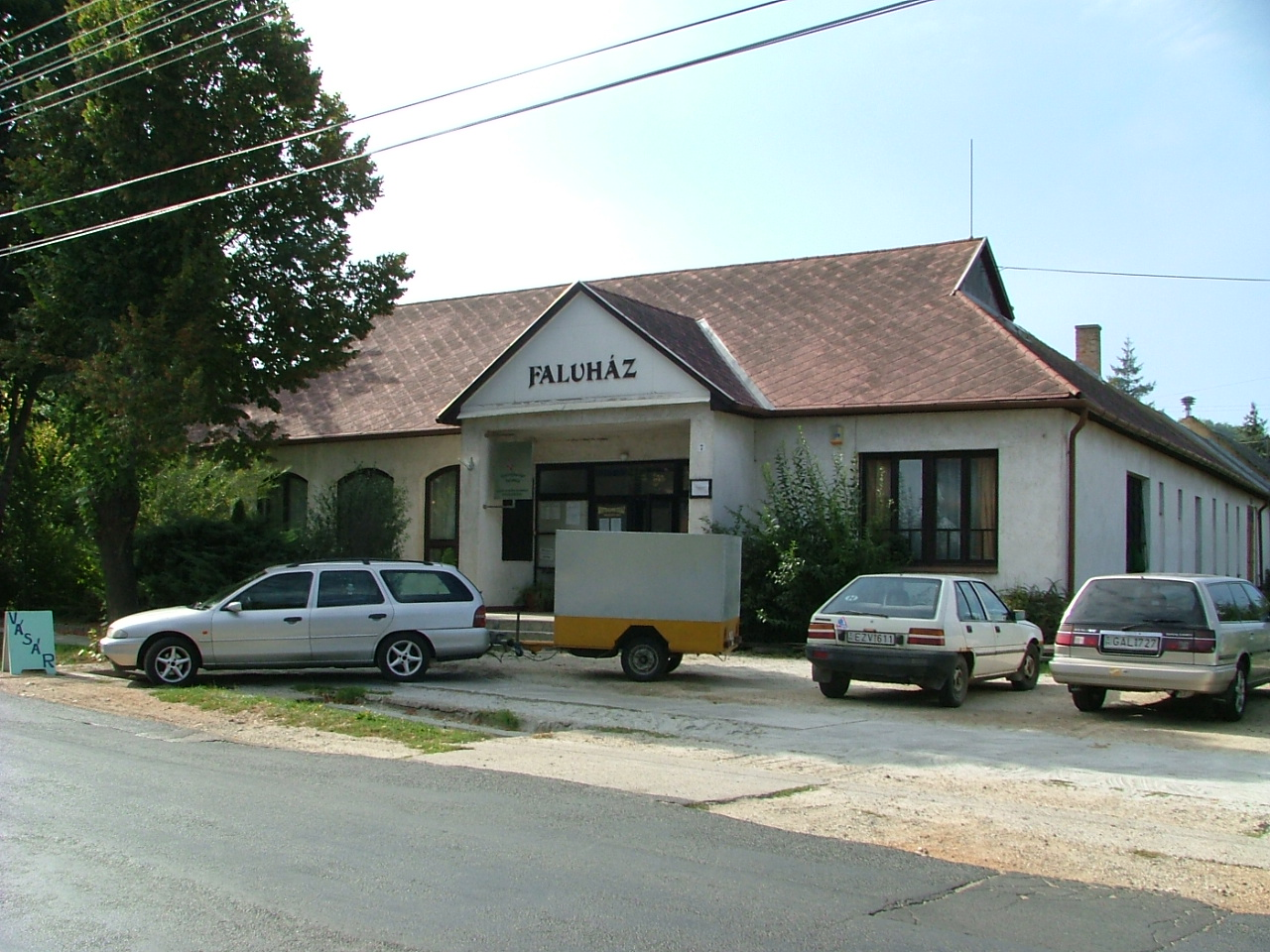
- Village hall

- Flag Coat of arms

- Location of Győrújbarát
- Coordinates: 47.60790°N 17.64636°E
- Country: Hungary
- County: Győr-Moson-Sopron

Area
  - Total: 33.68 km^{2} (13.00 sq mi)

Population (2018)
  - Total: 7,587
  - Density: 225.3/km^{2} (583.4/sq mi)
- Time zone: UTC+1 (CET)
  - Summer (DST): UTC+2 (CEST)
- Postal code: 9081
- Area code: 96
- Motorways: M1
- Distance from Budapest: 125 km (78 mi) East

Győrújbarát is a village in Győr-Moson-Sopron county, Hungary, located near Győr.
