= Dunaszentpál =

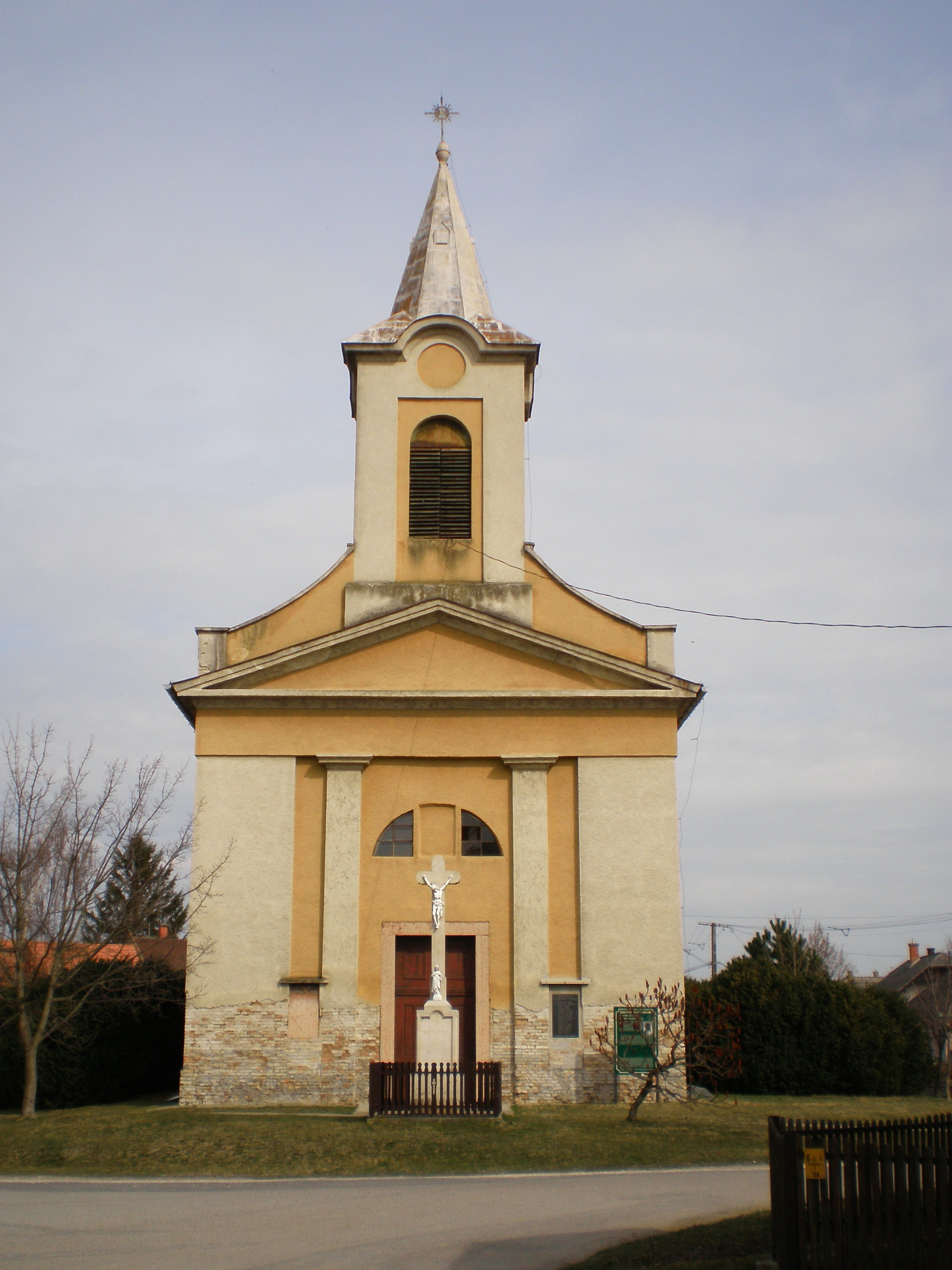
- Catholic church

- Flag Coat of arms

- Location of Győr-Moson-Sopron county in Hungary

- Location of Dunaszentpál
- Coordinates: 47.77570°N 17.50417°E
- Country: Hungary
- County: Győr-Moson-Sopron

Area
  - Total: 9.81 km^{2} (3.79 sq mi)

Population (2004)
  - Total: 667
  - Density: 67.99/km^{2} (176.1/sq mi)
- Time zone: UTC+1 (CET)
  - Summer (DST): UTC+2 (CEST)
- Postal code: 9175
- Area code: 96

Dunaszentpál is a village in Győr-Moson-Sopron county, Hungary.
