= Csér =

- Flag Coat of arms

- Location of Győr-Moson-Sopron county in Hungary

- Location of Csér
- Coordinates: 47.41757°N 16.93245°E
- Country: Hungary
- County: Győr-Moson-Sopron

Area
  - Total: 2.93 km^{2} (1.13 sq mi)

Population (2004)
  - Total: 45
  - Density: 15.35/km^{2} (39.8/sq mi)
- Time zone: UTC+1 (CET)
  - Summer (DST): UTC+2 (CEST)
- Postal code: 9375
- Area code: 99

Csér is a village in Győr-Moson-Sopron County, Hungary.
