= Kunsziget =

- Coat of arms

- Location of Győr-Moson-Sopron county in Hungary

- Location of Kunsziget
- Coordinates: 47.73952°N 17.52076°E
- Country: Hungary
- County: Győr-Moson-Sopron

Area
  - Total: 17.87 km^{2} (6.90 sq mi)

Population (2004)
  - Total: 1,227
  - Density: 68.66/km^{2} (177.8/sq mi)
- Time zone: UTC+1 (CET)
  - Summer (DST): UTC+2 (CEST)
- Postal code: 9184
- Area code: 96

Kunsziget is a village in Győr-Moson-Sopron county, Hungary.
