= Várbalog =

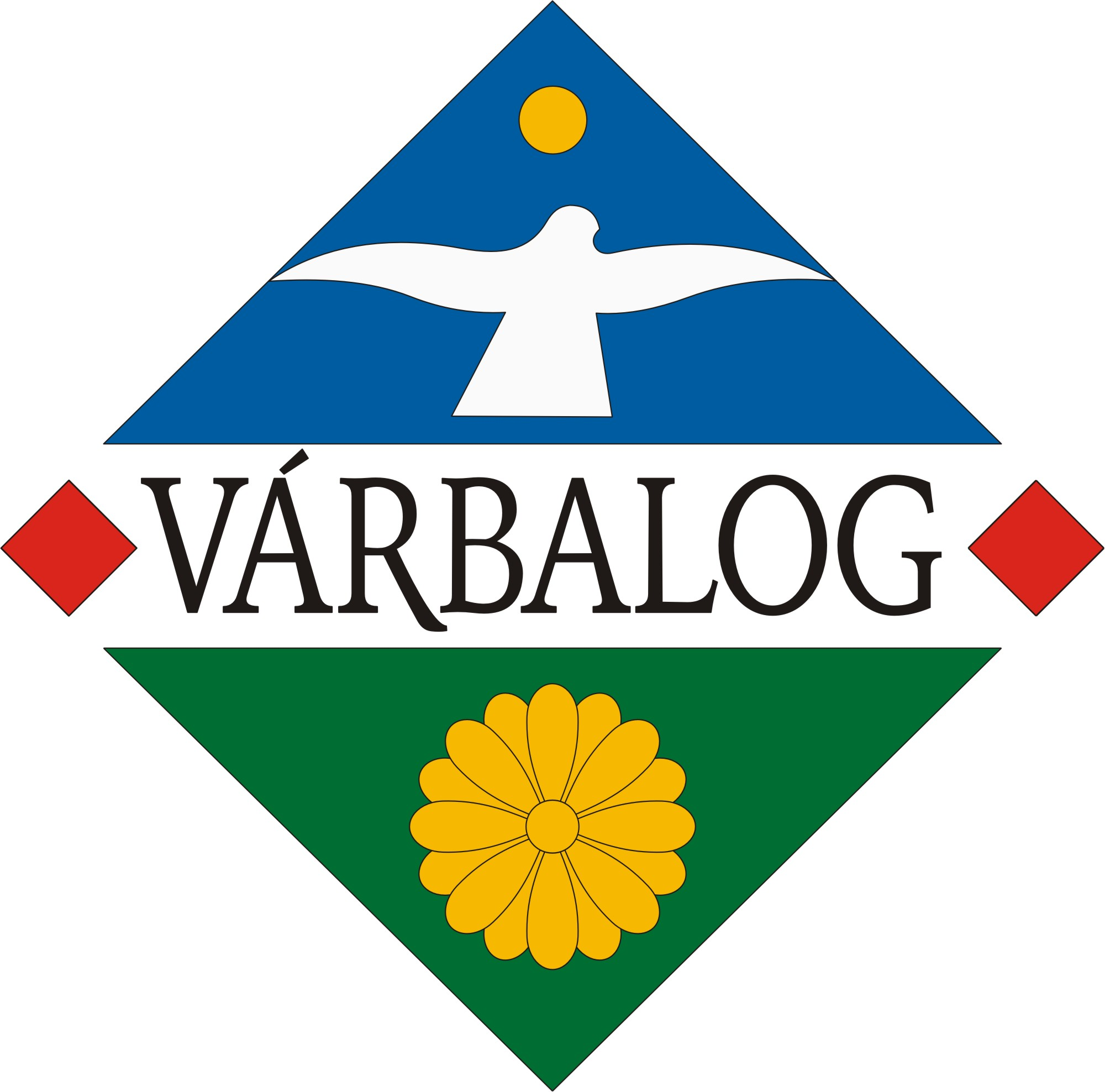
- Coat of arms

- Location of Várbalog
- Coordinates: 47.83070°N 17.06675°E
- Country: Hungary
- County: Győr-Moson-Sopron

Government
  - Mayor: Lukács Zsolt (Ind.)

Area
  - Total: 22.70 km^{2} (8.76 sq mi)

Population (2022)
  - Total: 369
  - Density: 16.3/km^{2} (42.1/sq mi)
- Time zone: UTC+1 (CET)
  - Summer (DST): UTC+2 (CEST)
- Postal code: 9243
- Area code: 96

Várbalog is a village in Győr-Moson-Sopron County, Hungary.
