= Mecsér =

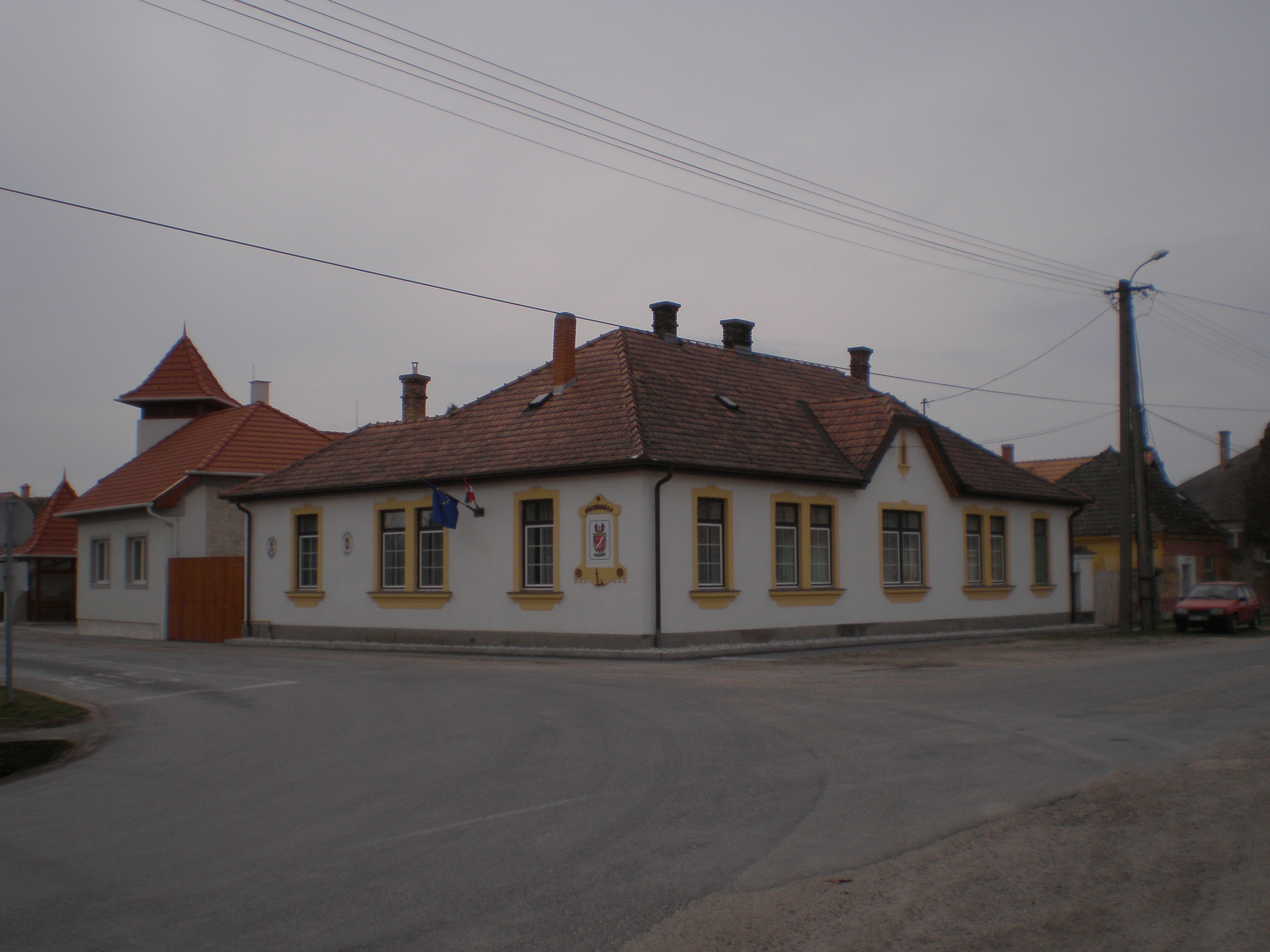
- Village hall

- Flag Coat of arms

- Location of Győr-Moson-Sopron county in Hungary

- Location of Mecsér
- Coordinates: 47.79598°N 17.47575°E
- Country: Hungary
- County: Győr-Moson-Sopron

Government
  - Mayor: Csaplár Zoltán Imre (Ind.)

Area
  - Total: 21.09 km^{2} (8.14 sq mi)

Population (2022)
  - Total: 635
  - Density: 30.1/km^{2} (78.0/sq mi)
- Time zone: UTC+1 (CET)
  - Summer (DST): UTC+2 (CEST)
- Postal code: 9176
- Area code: 96

Mecsér is a village in Győr-Moson-Sopron county, Hungary.
