= Rétalap =

- Flag Coat of arms

- Location of Rétalap
- Coordinates: 47.6000°N 17.9167°E
- Country: Hungary
- County: Győr-Moson-Sopron

Area
  - Total: 13.2 km^{2} (5.1 sq mi)

Population (2001)
  - Total: 564
  - Density: 42.7/km^{2} (111/sq mi)
- Time zone: UTC+1 (CET)
  - Summer (DST): UTC+2 (CEST)
- Postal code: 9074
- Website: retalap.hu

Rétalap is a village in Győr-Moson-Sopron County, Hungary.
