= Darnózseli =

- Flag Coat of arms

- Location of Győr-Moson-Sopron county in Hungary

- Location of Darnózseli
- Coordinates: 47.84930°N 17.42674°E
- Country: Hungary
- County: Győr-Moson-Sopron

Area
  - Total: 19.61 km^{2} (7.57 sq mi)

Population (2004)
  - Total: 1,595
  - Density: 81.33/km^{2} (210.6/sq mi)
- Time zone: UTC+1 (CET)
  - Summer (DST): UTC+2 (CEST)
- Postal code: 9232
- Area code: 96

Darnózseli is a village in Győr-Moson-Sopron county, Hungary.

Darnózseli (1600 inhabitants) is located in the center of Szigetköz, which is Hungary's biggest island. It is enclosed by the Old Danube and the Moson Danube.

In Darnózseli, there is a chapel which was constructed in 1787. At that time, the independent parsonage was found. The sanctuary has been restored and can nowadays be visited on the cemetery grounds. The present neoclassical church was built in 1930. The scape of the village is formed by traditional Hungarian residential houses. Another attraction are some 100-year-old oak trees (“Millennium Oaks”), which have been planted in order to honor the 1000th anniversary of the conquest of Hungary. In the Zseli forest, there is a monument to commemorate the Napoleonic battles.

Some Germans and Austrians have already settled in Darnózseli.
