= Győrladamér =

- Flag Coat of arms

- Location of Győr-Moson-Sopron county in Hungary

- Location of Győrladamér
- Coordinates: 47.75527°N 17.56224°E
- Country: Hungary
- County: Győr-Moson-Sopron

Area
  - Total: 8.6 km^{2} (3.3 sq mi)

Population (2004)
  - Total: 1,288
  - Density: 149.76/km^{2} (387.9/sq mi)
- Time zone: UTC+1 (CET)
  - Summer (DST): UTC+2 (CEST)
- Postal code: 9173
- Area code: 96

Győrladamér is a village in Győr-Moson-Sopron county, Hungary.

It is situated between Győrzámoly and Duna-szeg. The Ladom brook, after which the village was named, possibly flowed on this marshy area. The name of the village was first mentioned in documents already in the 12th century. The church was built in 1946 from a manorial granary. The tower was erected in 1967, the interior was formed in 1997. Nádas Lake and the Somos forest in the Lower Szigetköz are protected. Its unique rare plants give beautiful spectacle. The Szavai canal is an excellent fishing place. A resting-place is to be built at the Mosoni-Danube near a riding hall.
