= Sokorópátka =

- Village
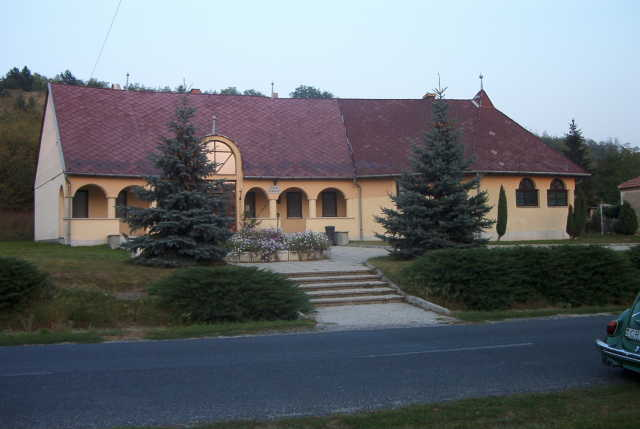
- Village hall

- Flag Coat of arms

- Location of Sokorópátka
- Coordinates: 47.4833°N 17.7000°E
- Country: Hungary
- County: Győr-Moson-Sopron

Government
  - Mayor: Bassák Attila (Ind.)

Area
  - Total: 16.86 km^{2} (6.51 sq mi)

Population (2022)
  - Total: 1,100
  - Density: 65/km^{2} (170/sq mi)
- Time zone: UTC+1 (CET)
  - Summer (DST): UTC+2 (CEST)
- Postal code: 9112
- Area code: 96

Sokorópátka is a village in Győr-Moson-Sopron County, Hungary.
