= Vásárosfalu =

- Village
- Flag Coat of arms

- Location of Vásárosfalu
- Coordinates: 47.4500°N 17.1167°E
- Country: Hungary
- County: Győr-Moson-Sopron

Area
  - Total: 4.20 km^{2} (1.62 sq mi)

Population (2025)
  - Total: 154
- Time zone: UTC+1 (CET)
  - Summer (DST): UTC+2 (CEST)
- Postal code: 9343
- Motorways: M86
- Distance from Budapest: 179 km (111 mi) East

Vásárosfalu is a village in Győr-Moson-Sopron County, Hungary.
