= Egyházasfalu =

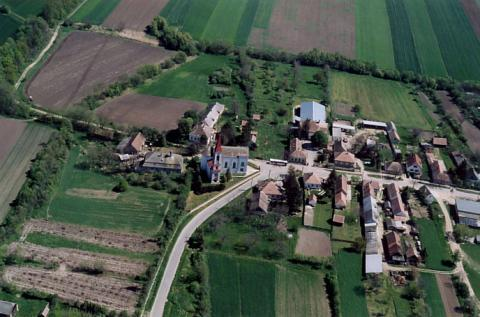
- Aerial photograph of Egyházasfalu

- Coat of arms

- Location of Győr-Moson-Sopron county in Hungary

- Location of Egyházasfalu
- Coordinates: 47.46372°N 16.76764°E
- Country: Hungary
- County: Győr-Moson-Sopron

Area
  - Total: 21.64 km^{2} (8.36 sq mi)

Population (2004)
  - Total: 913
  - Density: 42.19/km^{2} (109.3/sq mi)
- Time zone: UTC+1 (CET)
  - Summer (DST): UTC+2 (CEST)
- Postal code: 9473
- Area code: 99

Egyházasfalu is a village in Győr-Moson-Sopron county, Hungary.
