= Sarród =

- Coat of arms

- Location of Sarród
- Coordinates: 47.63170°N 16.86039°E
- Country: Hungary
- County: Győr-Moson-Sopron

Area
  - Total: 40.07 km^{2} (15.47 sq mi)

Population (2025)
  - Total: 1,062
  - Density: 26.50/km^{2} (68.64/sq mi)
- Time zone: UTC+1 (CET)
  - Summer (DST): UTC+2 (CEST)
- Postal code: 9435
- Area code: 99
- Website: http://www.sarrod.hu

Sarród is a village in Győr-Moson-Sopron County, Hungary. It lies adjacent to the Fertő-Hanság National Park, a World Heritage site.
