= Mérges =

- Location of Győr-Moson-Sopron county in Hungary

- Location of Mérges
- Coordinates: 47.60132°N 17.44319°E
- Country: Hungary
- County: Győr-Moson-Sopron

Area
  - Total: 6.51 km^{2} (2.51 sq mi)

Population (2004)
  - Total: 81
  - Density: 12.44/km^{2} (32.2/sq mi)
- Time zone: UTC+1 (CET)
  - Summer (DST): UTC+2 (CEST)
- Postal code: 9136
- Area code: 96

Mérges is a village in Győr-Moson-Sopron county, Hungary.
