= Petőháza =

- Coat of arms

- Location of Győr-Moson-Sopron county in Hungary

- Location of Petőháza
- Coordinates: 47.59481°N 16.89336°E
- Country: Hungary
- County: Győr-Moson-Sopron

Area
  - Total: 2.64 km^{2} (1.02 sq mi)

Population (2004)
  - Total: 1,048
  - Density: 396.96/km^{2} (1,028.1/sq mi)
- Time zone: UTC+1 (CET)
  - Summer (DST): UTC+2 (CEST)
- Postal code: 9443
- Area code: 99

Petőháza is a village in Győr-Moson-Sopron county, Hungary.

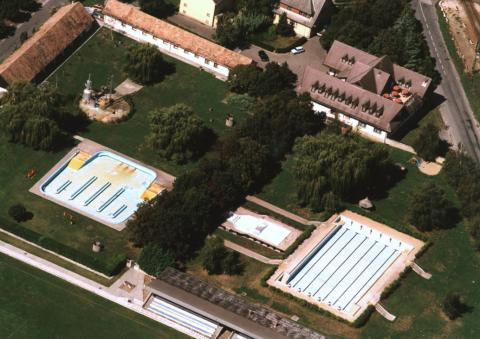
Aerial photography of Petőháza
