= Völcsej =

- Coat of arms

- Location of Völcsej
- Coordinates: 47.49825°N 16.76653°E
- Country: Hungary
- County: Győr-Moson-Sopron

Government
  - Mayor: Szőke Attila (Ind.)

Area
  - Total: 9.31 km^{2} (3.59 sq mi)

Population (2022)
  - Total: 401
  - Density: 43.1/km^{2} (112/sq mi)
- Time zone: UTC+1 (CET)
  - Summer (DST): UTC+2 (CEST)
- Postal code: 9462
- Area code: 99

Völcsej is a village in Győr-Moson-Sopron County, Hungary.
