= Nemeskér =

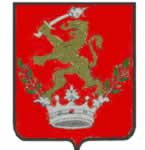
- Coat of arms

- Location of Győr-Moson-Sopron county in Hungary

- Location of Nemeskér
- Coordinates: 47.48471°N 16.80526°E
- Country: Hungary
- County: Győr-Moson-Sopron

Area
  - Total: 6.42 km^{2} (2.48 sq mi)

Population (2004)
  - Total: 228
  - Density: 35.51/km^{2} (92.0/sq mi)
- Time zone: UTC+1 (CET)
  - Summer (DST): UTC+2 (CEST)
- Postal code: 9471
- Area code: 99

Nemeskér is a village in Győr-Moson-Sopron county, Hungary.
