= Szerecseny =

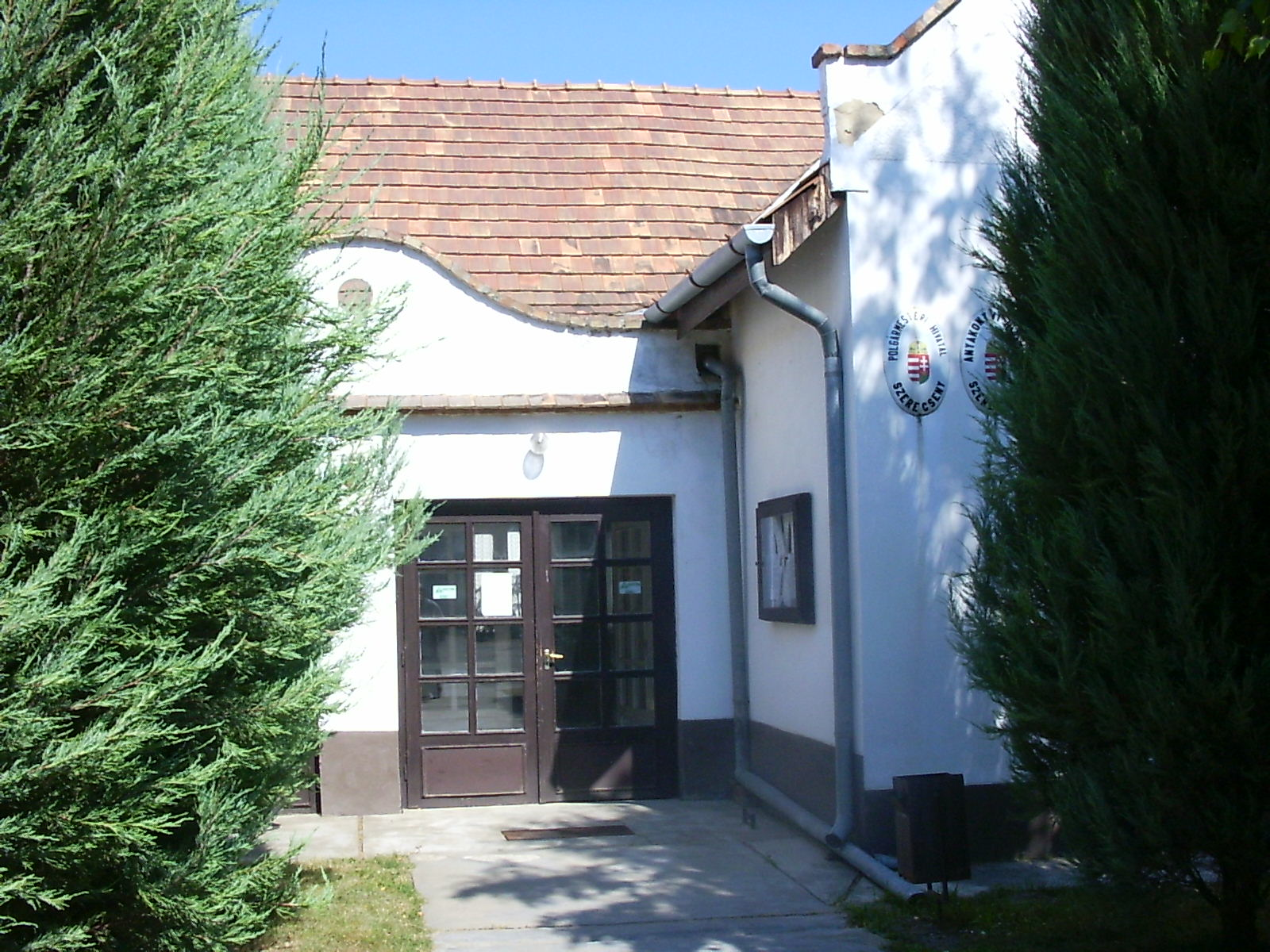
- Village hall

- Flag Coat of arms

- Location of Győr-Moson-Sopron county in Hungary

- Location of Szerecseny
- Coordinates: 47.46191°N 17.55480°E
- Country: Hungary
- County: Győr-Moson-Sopron

Area
  - Total: 12.39 km^{2} (4.78 sq mi)

Population (2004)
  - Total: 913
  - Density: 73.68/km^{2} (190.8/sq mi)
- Time zone: UTC+1 (CET)
  - Summer (DST): UTC+2 (CEST)
- Postal code: 9125
- Area code: 96

Szerecseny is a village in Győr-Moson-Sopron county, Hungary.
