= Rábaszentmiklós =

- Flag Coat of arms

- Location of Rábaszentmiklós in Hungary
- Coordinates: 47.5333°N 17.4167°E
- Country: Hungary
- Region: Western Transdanubia
- County: Győr-Moson-Sopron
- Subregion: Téti
- Rank: Village

Area
  - Total: 5.01 km^{2} (1.93 sq mi)

Population (1 January 2008)
  - Total: 129
  - Density: 25.7/km^{2} (66.7/sq mi)
- Time zone: UTC+1 (CET)
  - Summer (DST): UTC+2 (CEST)
- Postal code: 9133
- Area code: +36 96
- KSH code: 17297
- Website: http://www.rabaszentmiklos.hu/

Rábaszentmiklós is a village in Hungary, in the Győr-Moson-Sopron county.

== Geography, setting, neighbours ==
The village is situated in the southern part of Győr-Moson-Sopron County, near to the Sokoró hill, in the Marcal-basin. The soil is loessy, limy sand, while between the Marcal and Rába rivers clay is the main component of the soil. The landscape is a plain, with some hills and plateaus with 114–120 m above the sea level.
