= Károlyháza =

Coordinates: 47°48′05″N 17°20′36″E

- Coat of arms

- Location of Győr-Moson-Sopron county in Hungary
- Country: Hungary
- County: Győr-Moson-Sopron

Area
  - Total: 11.25 km^{2} (4.34 sq mi)

Population (2004)
  - Total: 553
  - Density: 49.15/km^{2} (127.3/sq mi)
- Time zone: UTC+1 (CET)
  - Summer (DST): UTC+2 (CEST)
- Postal code: 9182
- Area code: 96
- Motorways: M1
- Distance from Budapest: 153 km (95 mi) East

Károlyháza is a village in Győr-Moson-Sopron county, Hungary.
