= Újkér =

- Village
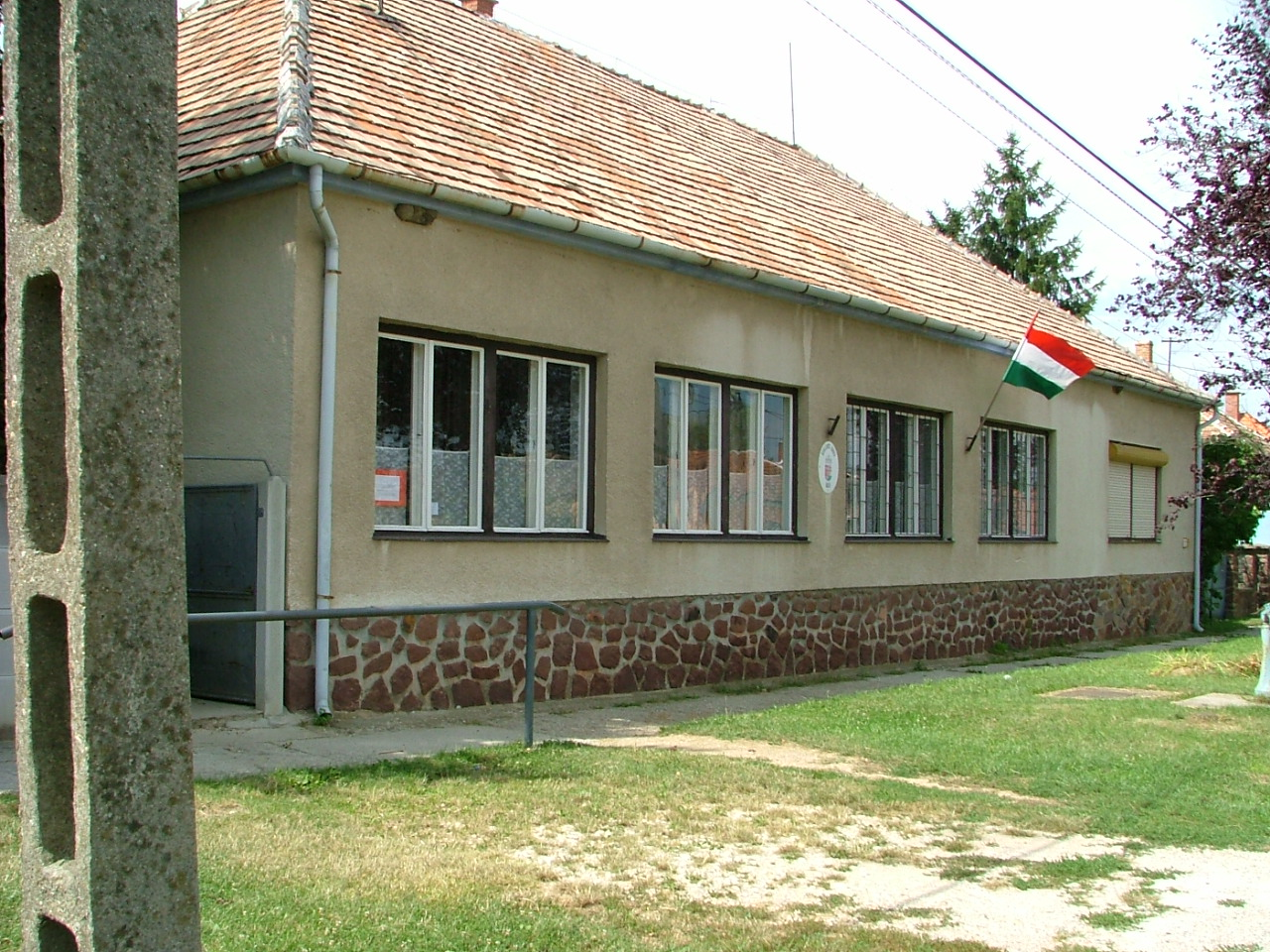
- Village hall

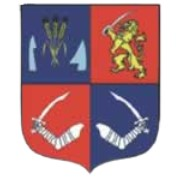
- Coat of arms

- Location of Újkér
- Coordinates: 47.46089°N 16.81243°E
- Country: Hungary
- County: Győr-Moson-Sopron

Area
  - Total: 32.38 km^{2} (12.50 sq mi)

Population (2010)
  - Total: 963
  - Density: 29.7/km^{2} (77.0/sq mi)
- Time zone: UTC+1 (CET)
  - Summer (DST): UTC+2 (CEST)
- Postal code: 9472
- Area code: 99
- Website: http://ujker.fw.hu

Újkér is a village in Győr-Moson-Sopron County, Hungary.
