= Tápszentmiklós =

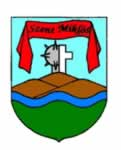
- Coat of arms

- Location of Győr-Moson-Sopron county in Hungary

- Location of Tápszentmiklós
- Coordinates: 47.49335°N 17.85207°E
- Country: Hungary
- County: Győr-Moson-Sopron

Area
  - Total: 20.78 km^{2} (8.02 sq mi)

Population (2004)
  - Total: 938
  - Density: 45.13/km^{2} (116.9/sq mi)
- Time zone: UTC+1 (CET)
  - Summer (DST): UTC+2 (CEST)
- Postal code: 9094
- Area code: 96

Tápszentmiklós is a village in Győr-Moson-Sopron county, Hungary.
