= Lázi =

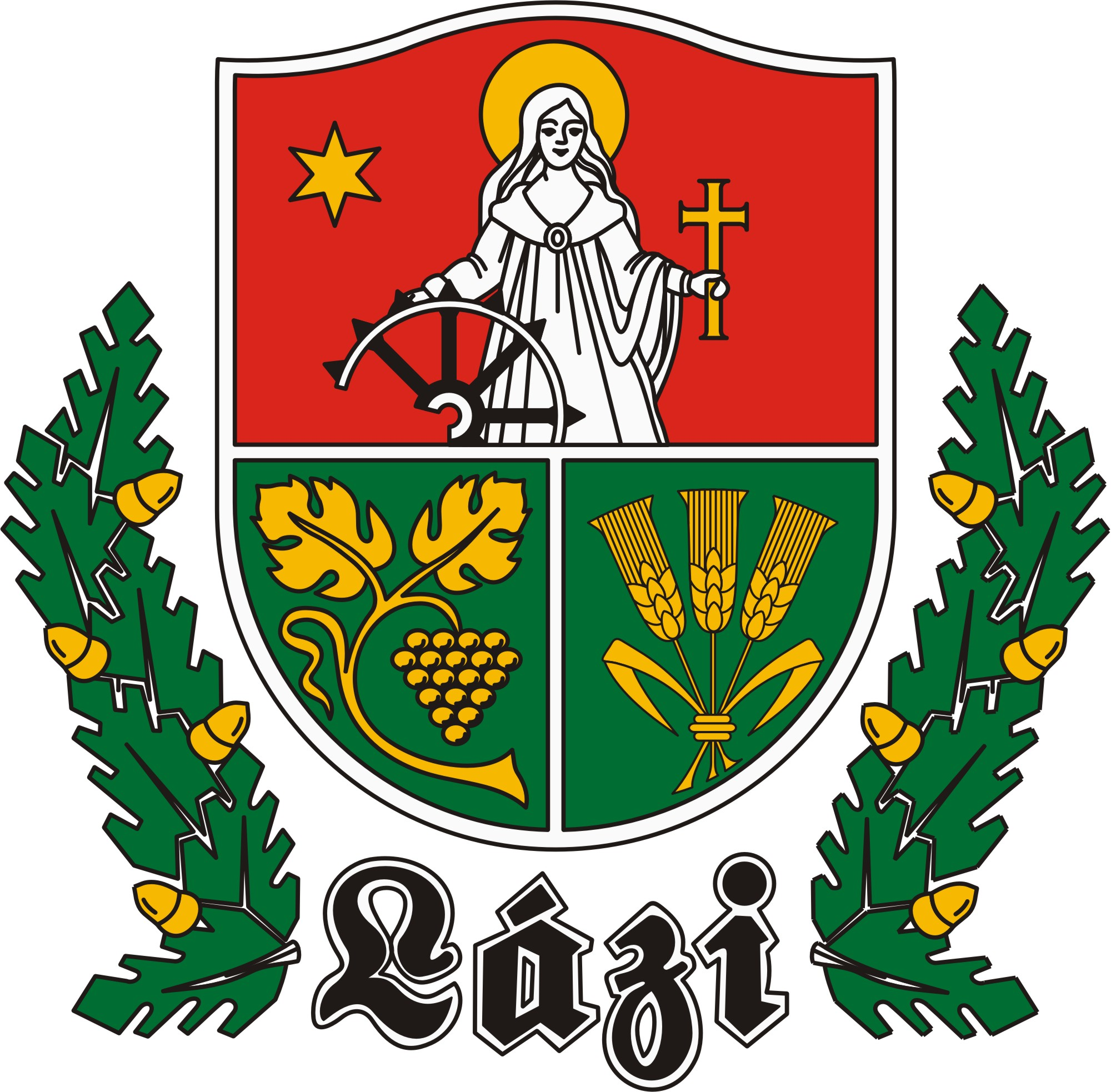
- Coat of arms

- Location of Győr-Moson-Sopron county in Hungary

- Location of Lázi
- Coordinates: 47.46568°N 17.83651°E
- Country: Hungary
- County: Győr-Moson-Sopron

Area
  - Total: 16.79 km^{2} (6.48 sq mi)

Population (2004)
  - Total: 618
  - Density: 36.8/km^{2} (95/sq mi)
- Time zone: UTC+1 (CET)
  - Summer (DST): UTC+2 (CEST)
- Postal code: 9089
- Area code: 88

Lázi is a village in Győr-Moson-Sopron county, Hungary.
