= Rábaszentmihály =

- Village
- Flag Coat of arms

- Location of Rábaszentmihály
- Coordinates: 47.5833°N 17.4333°E
- Country: Hungary
- County: Győr-Moson-Sopron

Area
  - Total: 10.97 km^{2} (4.24 sq mi)

Population (2025)
  - Total: 478
  - Density: 43.6/km^{2} (113/sq mi)
- Time zone: UTC+1 (CET)
  - Summer (DST): UTC+2 (CEST)
- Postal code: 9135

Rábaszentmihály is a village in Győr-Moson-Sopron County, Hungary.
