= Fenyőfő =

- Flag Coat of arms

- Location of Győr-Moson-Sopron county in Hungary

- Location of Fenyőfő
- Coordinates: 47.35054°N 17.76517°E
- Country: Hungary
- County: Győr-Moson-Sopron

Area
  - Total: 29.65 km^{2} (11.45 sq mi)

Population (2004)
  - Total: 149
  - Density: 5.02/km^{2} (13.0/sq mi)
- Time zone: UTC+1 (CET)
  - Summer (DST): UTC+2 (CEST)
- Postal code: 8432
- Area code: 88

Fenyőfő is a village in Győr-Moson-Sopron county, Hungary.
