= Gyalóka =

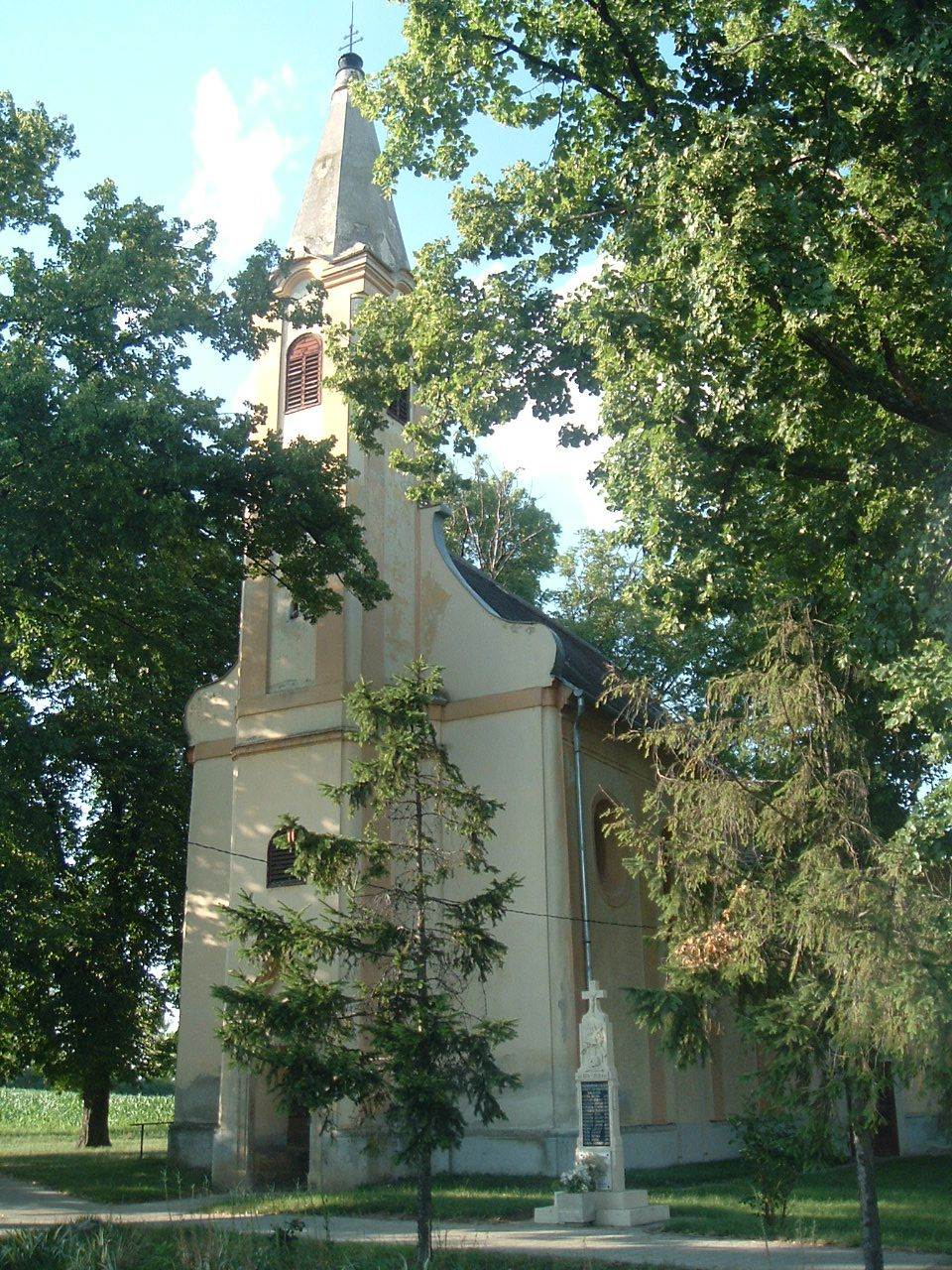
- Gyalóka in 2007

- Location of Győr-Moson-Sopron county in Hungary

- Location of Gyalóka
- Coordinates: 47.44292°N 16.69652°E
- Country: Hungary
- County: Győr-Moson-Sopron

Area
  - Total: 3.93 km^{2} (1.52 sq mi)

Population (2004)
  - Total: 73
  - Density: 18.57/km^{2} (48.1/sq mi)
- Time zone: UTC+1 (CET)
  - Summer (DST): UTC+2 (CEST)
- Postal code: 9474
- Area code: 99

Gyalóka is a village in Győr-Moson-Sopron county, Hungary.
