= Pinnye =

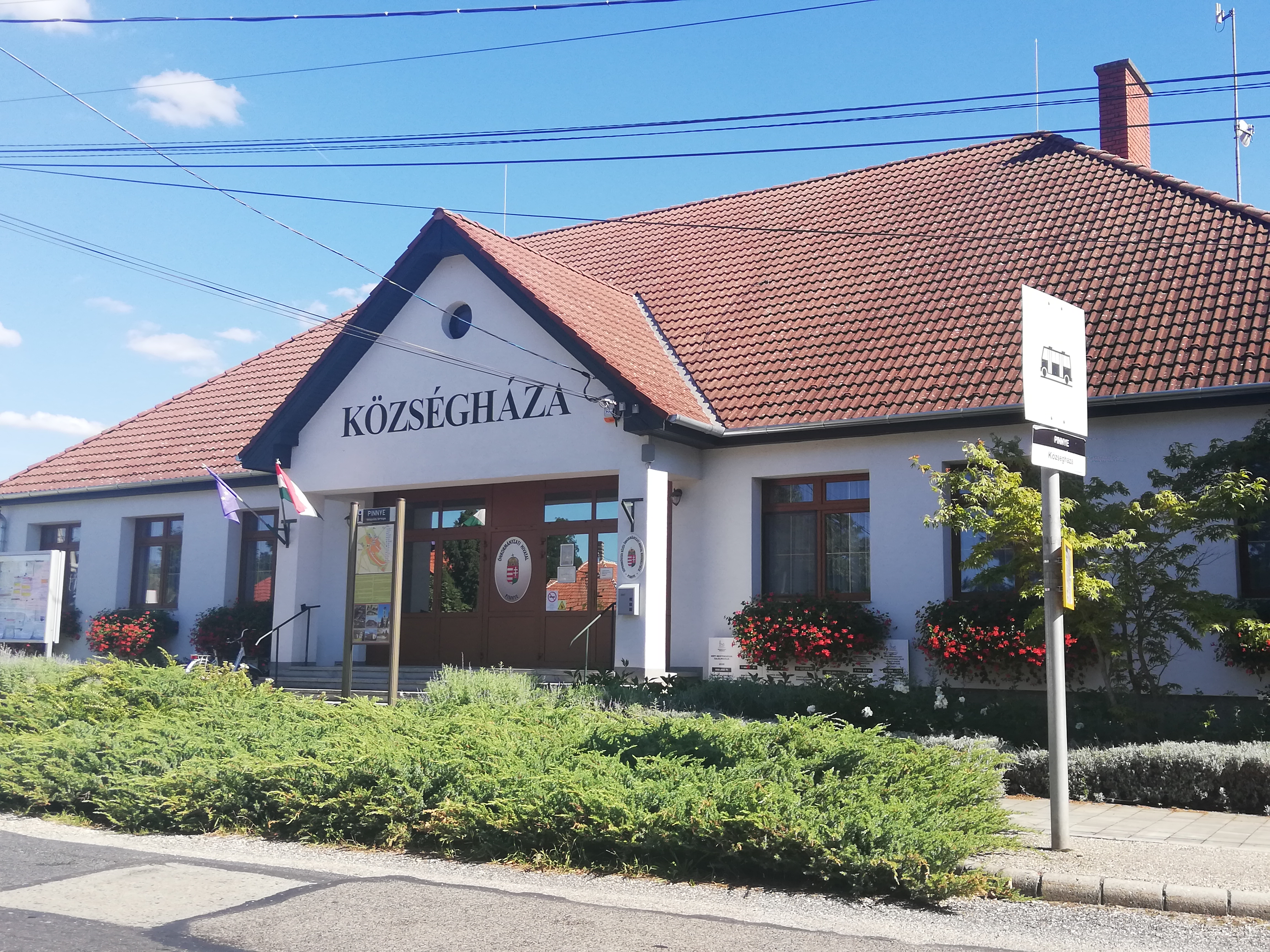
- Village hall

- Coat of arms

- Location of Győr-Moson-Sopron county in Hungary

- Location of Pinnye
- Coordinates: 47.58596°N 16.77023°E
- Country: Hungary
- County: Győr-Moson-Sopron

Area
  - Total: 8.65 km^{2} (3.34 sq mi)

Population (2004)
  - Total: 351
  - Density: 40.57/km^{2} (105.1/sq mi)
- Time zone: UTC+1 (CET)
  - Summer (DST): UTC+2 (CEST)
- Postal code: 9481
- Area code: 99

Pinnye is a village in Győr-Moson-Sopron county, Hungary.
