= Győrasszonyfa =

- Flag Coat of arms

- Location of Győr-Moson-Sopron county in Hungary

- Location of Győrasszonyfa
- Coordinates: 47.49582°N 17.80673°E
- Country: Hungary
- County: Győr-Moson-Sopron

Area
  - Total: 6.48 km^{2} (2.50 sq mi)

Population (2004)
  - Total: 506
  - Density: 78.08/km^{2} (202.2/sq mi)
- Time zone: UTC+1 (CET)
  - Summer (DST): UTC+2 (CEST)
- Postal code: 9093
- Area code: 96

Győrasszonyfa is a village in Győr-Moson-Sopron county, Hungary.
