= Zsira =

- Flag Coat of arms

- Location of Győr-Moson-Sopron county in Hungary

- Location of Zsira
- Coordinates: 47.45708°N 16.67805°E
- Country: Hungary
- County: Győr-Moson-Sopron

Area
  - Total: 14.68 km^{2} (5.67 sq mi)

Population (2004)
  - Total: 761
  - Density: 51.83/km^{2} (134.2/sq mi)
- Time zone: UTC+1 (CET)
  - Summer (DST): UTC+2 (CEST)
- Postal code: 9476
- Area code: 99

Zsira is a village in Győr-Moson-Sopron county, Hungary.

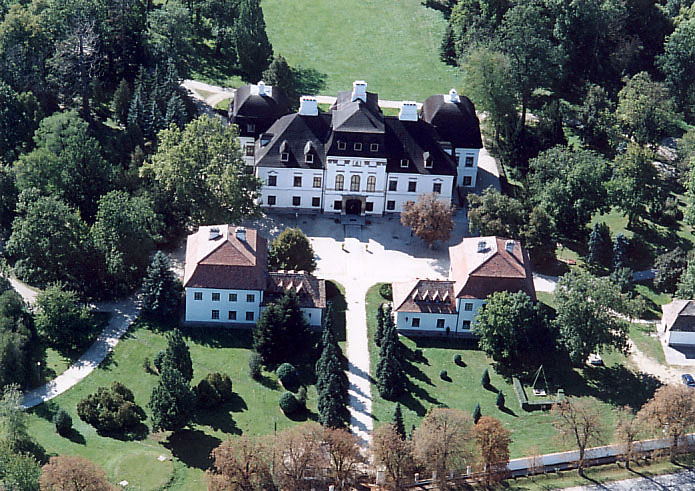
Aerial photography of Zsira Palace
