= Szakony =

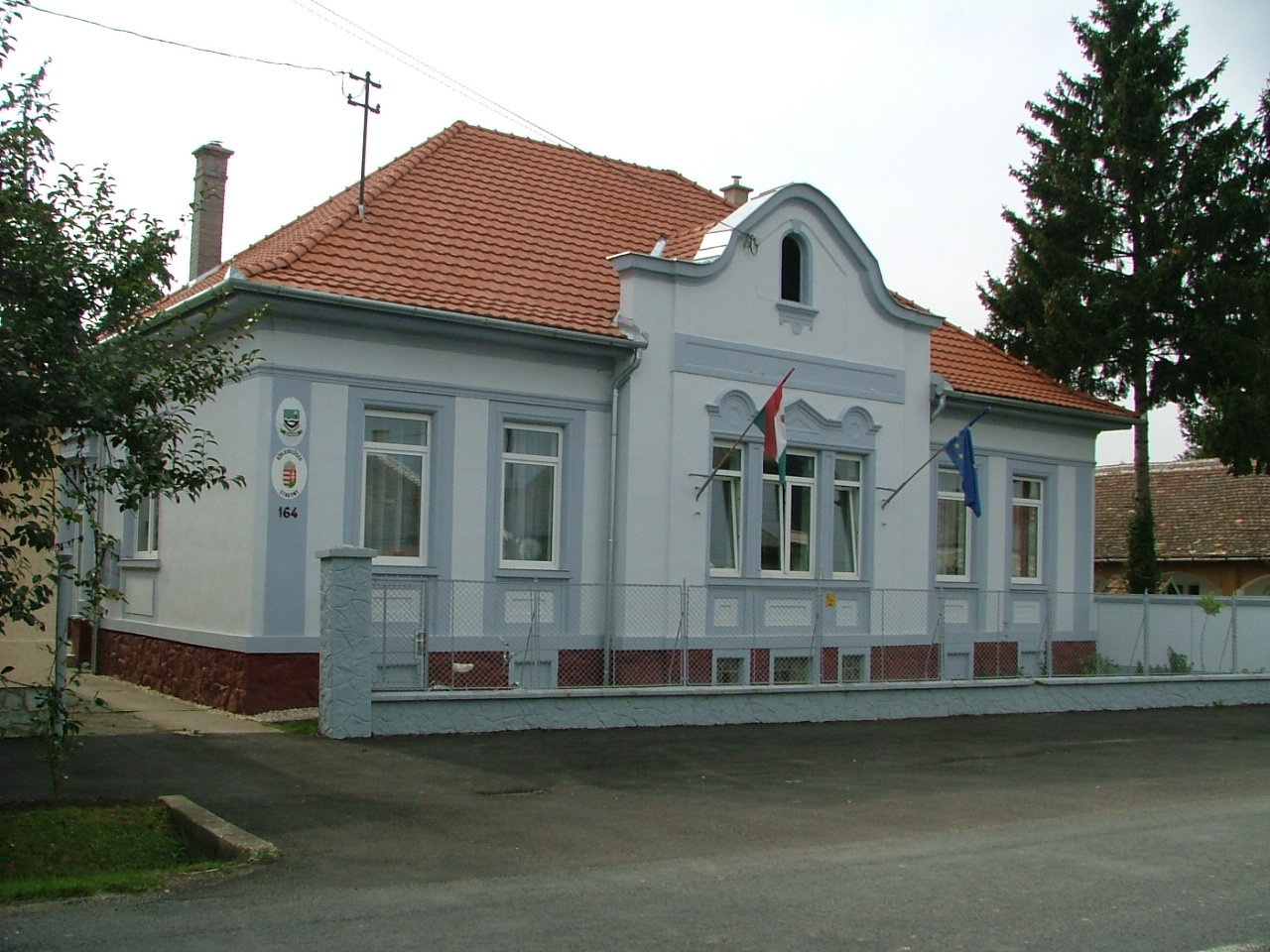
- Village hall

- Coat of arms

- Location of Győr-Moson-Sopron county in Hungary

- Location of Szakony
- Coordinates: 47.42605°N 16.71507°E
- Country: Hungary
- County: Győr-Moson-Sopron

Area
  - Total: 13.5 km^{2} (5.2 sq mi)

Population (2004)
  - Total: 501
  - Density: 37.11/km^{2} (96.1/sq mi)
- Time zone: UTC+1 (CET)
  - Summer (DST): UTC+2 (CEST)
- Postal code: 9474
- Area code: 99

Szakony is a village in Győr-Moson-Sopron county, Hungary.
