= Tarjánpuszta =

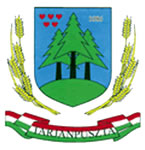
- Coat of arms

- Location of Győr-Moson-Sopron county in Hungary

- Location of Tarjánpuszta
- Coordinates: 47.50723°N 17.78681°E
- Country: Hungary
- County: Győr-Moson-Sopron

Area
  - Total: 8.44 km^{2} (3.26 sq mi)

Population (2004)
  - Total: 393
  - Density: 46.56/km^{2} (120.6/sq mi)
- Time zone: UTC+1 (CET)
  - Summer (DST): UTC+2 (CEST)
- Postal code: 9092
- Area code: 96

Tarjánpuszta is a village in Győr-Moson-Sopron county, Hungary.
