= Szárföld =

- Flag Coat of arms

- Location of Győr–Moson–Sopron county in Hungary

- Location of Szárföld
- Coordinates: 47.59445°N 17.1204°E
- Country: Hungary
- County: Győr–Moson–Sopron

Area
  - Total: 17.15 km^{2} (6.62 sq mi)

Population (2004)
  - Total: 865
  - Density: 50.43/km^{2} (130.6/sq mi)
- Time zone: UTC+1 (CET)
  - Summer (DST): UTC+2 (CEST)
- Postal code: 9353
- Area code: 96

Szárföld is a village in Győr–Moson–Sopron county, Hungary.

In the 19th century a small Jewish community lived in the village, many of whose members were murdered in the Holocaust
