= Ebergőc =

- Coat of arms

- Location of Győr-Moson-Sopron county in Hungary

- Location of Ebergőc
- Coordinates: 47.56343°N 16.81159°E
- Country: Hungary
- County: Győr-Moson-Sopron

Area
  - Total: 5.02 km^{2} (1.94 sq mi)

Population (2004)
  - Total: 139
  - Density: 27.68/km^{2} (71.7/sq mi)
- Time zone: UTC+1 (CET)
  - Summer (DST): UTC+2 (CEST)
- Postal code: 9451
- Area code: 99

Ebergőc is a village in Győr-Moson-Sopron county, Hungary.
