= Győr-Moson-Sopron County 3rd constituency =

Constituency in Hungary (2012-)

Győr-Moson-Sopron County 3rd constituency (Csorna)
- Constituency for the National Assembly
- Location of Győr-Moson-Sopron county 03 within Győr-Moson-Sopron county

- Location of Győr-Moson-Sopron county within Hungary
- County: Győr-Moson-Sopron
- Electorate: 66,713 (2022)
- Major settlements: Csorna

Current constituency
- Created: 2011; 15 years ago
- Party: Fidesz–KDNP
- Member: Alpár Gyopáros
- Elected: 2014, 2018, 2022, 2026

The 3rd constituency of Győr-Moson-Sopron County (Hungarian: Győr-Moson-Sopron megyei 03. számú országgyűlési egyéni választókerület) is one of the single member constituencies of the National Assembly, the national legislature of Hungary. The constituency standard abbreviation: Győr-Moson-Sopron 03. OEVK.

Since 2014, it has been represented by Alpár Gyopáros of the Fidesz–KDNP party alliance.

== Geography ==
The 3rd constituency is located in central-southern part of Győr-Moson-Sopron County.

=== List of municipalities ===
The constituency includes the following municipalities:

1. Acsalag
2. Agyagosszergény
3. Árpás
4. Babót
5. Bágyogszovát
6. Barbacs
7. Beled
8. Bezi
9. Bodonhely
10. Bogyoszló
11. Bősárkány
12. Cirák
13. Csáfordjánosfa
14. Csapod
15. Csér
16. Csikvánd
17. Csorna
18. Dénesfa
19. Dör
20. Edve
21. Egyed
22. Enese
23. Farád
24. Fehértó
25. Fertőendréd
26. Gyarmat
27. Gyóró
28. Győrsövényház
29. Győrszemere
30. Himod
31. Hövej
32. Ikrény
33. Iván
34. Jobaháza
35. Kapuvár
36. Kisbabot
37. Kisfalud
38. Koroncó
39. Kóny
40. Maglóca
41. Magyarkeresztúr
42. Markotabödöge
43. Mérges
44. Mihályi
45. Mórichida
46. Osli
47. Páli
48. Pásztori
49. Potyond
50. Pusztacsalád
51. Rábacsanak
52. Rábacsécsény
53. Rábakecöl
54. Rábapatona
55. Rábapordány
56. Rábasebes
57. Rábaszentandrás
58. Rábaszentmihály
59. Rábaszentmiklós
60. Rábatamási
61. Répceszemere
62. Sobor
63. Sopronnémeti
64. Szany
65. Szárföld
66. Szil
67. Szilsárkány
68. Tárnokréti
69. Tét
70. Vadosfa
71. Vág
72. Vásárosfalu
73. Veszkény
74. Vitnyéd
75. Zsebeháza

== Members ==
The constituency was first represented by Alpár Gyopáros of the Fidesz from 2014, and he was re-elected in 2018, 2022, and 2026.

Election	Member	Party	%	Ref.
2014	Alpár Gyopáros	Fidesz	58.85	
2018	Alpár Gyopáros	Fidesz	63.90	
2022	Alpár Gyopáros	Fidesz	71.22	
2026	Alpár Gyopáros	Fidesz	47.42	
