= Csorna District =

Csorna District Csornai járás
- Districts of Hungary
- Coat of arms

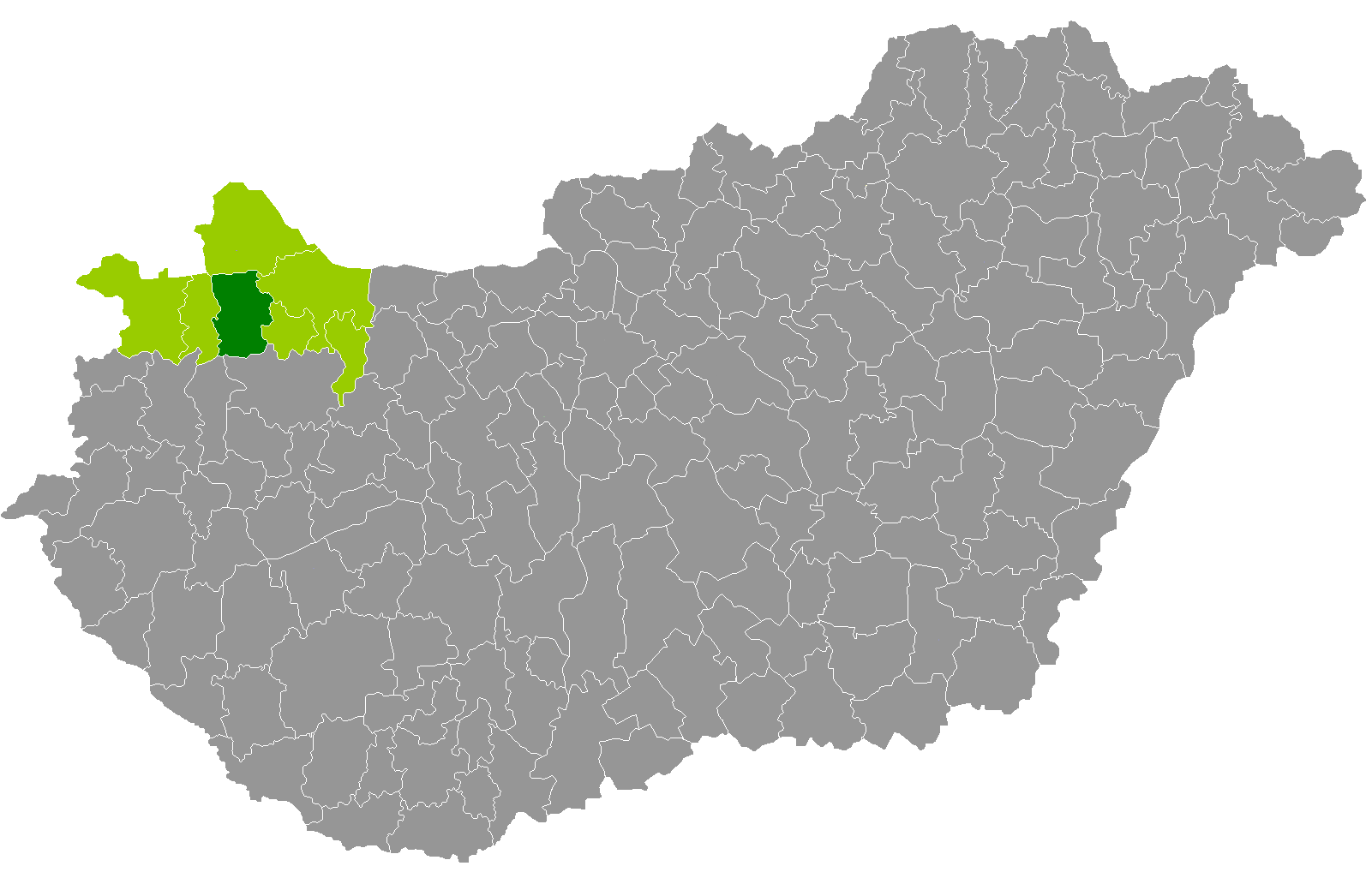
- Csorna District within Hungary and Győr-Moson-Sopron County.
- Coordinates: 47.61°N 17.25°E
- Country: Hungary
- County: Győr-Moson-Sopron
- District seat: Csorna

Area
  - Total: 579.77 km^{2} (223.85 sq mi)
  - Rank: 4th in Győr-Moson-Sopron

Population (2011 census)
  - Total: 32,970
  - Rank: 4th in Győr-Moson-Sopron
  - Density: 57/km^{2} (150/sq mi)

Csorna (Hungarian: Csornai járás) is a district in central part of Győr-Moson-Sopron County. Csorna is also the name of the town where the district seat is found. The district is located in the Western Transdanubia Statistical Region.

== Geography ==
Csorna District borders with Mosonmagyaróvár District to the north, Győr District and Tét District to the east, Pápa District (Veszprém County) to the south, Kapuvár District to the west. The number of the inhabited places in Csorna District is 33.

== Municipalities ==
The district has 1 town, 2 large villages and 30 villages. (ordered by population, as of 1 January 2012)

- Acsalag (452)
- Bágyogszovát (1,284)
- Barbacs (716)
- Bodonhely (277)
- Bogyoszló (598)
- Bősárkány (2,111)
- Cakóháza (48)
- **Csorna** (10,649) – district seat
- Dör (693)
- Egyed (517)
- Farád (1,926)
- Jobaháza (527)
- Kóny (2,613)
- Maglóca (96)
- Magyarkeresztúr (430)
- Markotabödöge (443)
- Páli (345)
- Pásztori (368)
- Potyond (101)
- Rábacsanak (460)
- Rábapordány (988)
- Rábasebes (81)
- Rábaszentandrás (497)
- Rábatamási (1,011)
- Rábcakapi (168)
- Sobor (270)
- Sopronnémeti (265)
- Szany (2,025)
- Szil (1,217)
- Szilsárkány (651)
- Tárnokréti (193)
- Vág (481)
- Zsebeháza (127)

The bolded municipality is city, italics municipalities are large villages.

== Demographics ==
Religion in Csorna District (2011 census)
1. Catholic Church (68.8%)
2. Greek Catholicism (0.10%)
3. Lutheranism (6.00%)
4. Calvinism (1.20%)
5. Other religions (0.50%)
6. Non-religious (3.50%)
7. Atheists (0.50%)
8. Undeclared (19.4%)

In 2011, it had a population of 32,970 and the population density was 57/km^{2}.

Year	County population	Change
2011	32,970	n/a

=== Ethnicity ===
Besides the Hungarian majority, the main minorities are the Roma (approx. 350) and German (300).

Total population (2011 census): 32,970
Ethnic groups (2011 census): Identified themselves: 30,102 persons:

- Hungarians: 29,205 (97.02%)
- Gypsies: 373 (1.24%)
- Others and indefinable: 524 (1.74%)

Approx. 3,000 persons in Csorna District did not declare their ethnic group at the 2011 census.

=== Religion ===
Religious adherence in the county according to 2011 census:

- Catholic – 22,705 (Roman Catholic – 22,664; Greek Catholic – 34);
- Evangelical – 1,987;
- Reformed – 388;
- other religions – 172;
- Non-religious – 1,170;
- Atheism – 153;
- Undeclared – 6,395.

== See also ==
- List of cities and towns in Hungary
