= List of populated places in Hungary (R) =

This is a list of cities, towns and villages of Hungary

KEY: T = Town ; V = Village

| Name | Rank | County | District | Population | Post code |
|---|---|---|---|---|---|
| Rábacsanak | V | Gyor-Moson-Sopron | Csornai | 580 | 9313 |
| Rábacsécsény | V | Gyor-Moson-Sopron | Téti | 593 | 9136 |
| Rábagyarmat | V | Tolna | Szentgotthárdi | 886 | 9961 |
| Rábahídvég | V | Tolna | Vasvári | 1,053 | 9777 |
| Rábakecöl | V | Gyor-Moson-Sopron | Kapuvári | 816 | 9344 |
| Rábapatona | V | Gyor-Moson-Sopron | Gyori | 2,496 | 9142 |
| Rábapaty | V | Tolna | Sárvári | 1,756 | 9641 |
| Rábapordány | V | Gyor-Moson-Sopron | Csornai | 1,135 | 9146 |
| Rábasebes | V | Gyor-Moson-Sopron | Csornai | 118 | 9327 |
| Rábaszentandrás | V | Gyor-Moson-Sopron | Csornai | 524 | 9316 |
| Rábaszentmihály | V | Gyor-Moson-Sopron | Téti | 521 | 9135 |
| Rábaszentmiklós | V | Gyor-Moson-Sopron | Téti | 144 | 9133 |
| Rábatamási | V | Gyor-Moson-Sopron | Csornai | 986 | 9322 |
| Rábatöttös | V | Tolna | Szombathelyi | 245 | 9766 |
| Rábcakapi | V | Gyor-Moson-Sopron | Csornai | 186 | 9165 |
| Rácalmás | V | Fejér | Dunaújvárosi | 4,102 | 2459 |
| Ráckeresztúr | V | Fejér | Ercsi | 3,159 | 2465 |
| Ráckeve | T | Pest | Ráckevei | 9,060 | 2300 |
| Rád | V | Pest | Váci | 1,647 | 2613 |
| Rádfalva | V | Baranya | Siklósi | 229 | 7846 |
| Rádóckölked | V | Tolna | Körmendi | 278 | 9784 |
| Radostyán | V | Borsod-Abaúj-Zemplén | Miskolci | 670 | 3776 |
| Ragály | V | Borsod-Abaúj-Zemplén | Kazincbarcikai | 693 | 3724 |
| Rajka | V | Gyor-Moson-Sopron | Mosonmagyaróvári | 2,616 | 9224 |
| Rakaca | V | Borsod-Abaúj-Zemplén | Edelényi | 907 | 3825 |
| Rakacaszend | V | Borsod-Abaúj-Zemplén | Edelényi | 379 | 3826 |
| Rakamaz | T | Szabolcs-Szatmár-Bereg | Tiszavasvári | 5,161 | 4465 |
| Rákóczibánya | V | Nógrád | Salgótarjáni | 691 | 3151 |
| Rákóczifalva | V | Jász-Nagykun-Szolnok | Szolnoki | 5,546 | 5085 |
| Rákócziújfalu | V | Jász-Nagykun-Szolnok | Szolnoki | 2,071 | 5084 |
| Ráksi | V | Somogy | Kaposvári | 517 | 7464 |
| Ramocsa | V | Zala | Lenti | 47 | 8973 |
| Ramocsaháza | V | Szabolcs-Szatmár-Bereg | Baktalórántházai | 1,531 | 4536 |
| Rápolt | V | Szabolcs-Szatmár-Bereg | Mátészalkai | 172 | 4756 |
| Raposka | V | Veszprém | Tapolcai | 227 | 8300 |
| Rásonysápberencs | V | Borsod-Abaúj-Zemplén | Szikszói | 564 | 3833 |
| Rátka | V | Borsod-Abaúj-Zemplén | Szerencsi | 1,068 | 3908 |
| Rátót | V | Tolna | Szentgotthárdi | 259 | 9951 |
| Ravazd | V | Gyor-Moson-Sopron | Pannonhalmi | 1,211 | 9091 |
| Recsk | V | Heves | Pétervásárai | 4,537 | 3245 |
| Réde | V | Komárom-Esztergom | Kisbéri | 1,532 | 2886 |
| Rédics | V | Zala | Lenti | 1,023 | 8978 |
| Regéc | V | Borsod-Abaúj-Zemplén | Abaúj–Hegyközi | 109 | 3893 |
| Regenye | V | Baranya | Pécsi | 180 | 7833 |
| Regöly | V | Tolna | Tamási | 1,315 | 7193 |
| Rém | V | Bács-Kiskun | Bajai | 1,454 | 6446 |
| Remeteszolos | V | Pest | Pilisvörösvári | 353 | 2090 |
| Répáshuta | V | Borsod-Abaúj-Zemplén | Miskolci | 549 | 3559 |
| Répcelak | T | Tolna | Sárvári | 2,669 | 9653 |
| Répceszemere | V | Gyor-Moson-Sopron | Sopron–Fertodi | 342 | 9375 |
| Répceszentgyörgy | V | Tolna | Csepregi | 134 | 9623 |
| Répcevis | V | Gyor-Moson-Sopron | Sopron–Fertodi | 398 | 9475 |
| Resznek | V | Zala | Lenti | 342 | 8977 |
| Rétalap | V | Gyor-Moson-Sopron | Gyori | 562 | 9074 |
| Rétközberencs | V | Szabolcs-Szatmár-Bereg | Kisvárdai | 1,175 | 4525 |
| Rétság | T | Nógrád | Rétsági | 3,049 | 2651 |
| Révfülöp | V | Veszprém | Tapolcai | 1,118 | 8253 |
| Révleányvár | V | Borsod-Abaúj-Zemplén | Bodrogközi | 622 | 3976 |
| Rezi | V | Zala | Keszthely–Hévízi | 1,100 | 8373 |
| Ricse | V | Borsod-Abaúj-Zemplén | Bodrogközi | 1,950 | 3974 |
| Rigács | V | Veszprém | Sümegi | 183 | 8348 |
| Rigyác | V | Zala | Letenyei | 527 | 8883 |
| Rimóc | V | Nógrád | Szécsényi | 1,929 | 3177 |
| Rinyabesenyo | V | Somogy | Nagyatádi | 233 | 7552 |
| Rinyakovácsi | V | Somogy | Kaposvári | 180 | 7527 |
| Rinyaszentkirály | V | Somogy | Nagyatádi | 428 | 7513 |
| Rinyaújlak | V | Somogy | Barcsi | 338 | 7556 |
| Rinyaújnép | V | Somogy | Barcsi | 58 | 7584 |
| Rohod | V | Szabolcs-Szatmár-Bereg | Baktalórántházai | 1,319 | 4563 |
| Románd | V | Gyor-Moson-Sopron | Pannonhalmi | 332 | 8434 |
| Romhány | V | Nógrád | Rétsági | 2,462 | 2654 |
| Romonya | V | Baranya | Pécsi | 423 | 7742 |
| Rózsafa | V | Baranya | Szigetvári | 418 | 7914 |
| Rozsály | V | Szabolcs-Szatmár-Bereg | Fehérgyarmati | 814 | 4971 |
| Rózsaszentmárton | V | Heves | Hatvani | 1,631 | 3033 |
| Röjtökmuzsaj | V | Gyor-Moson-Sopron | Sopron–Fertodi | 507 | 9451 |
| Rönök | V | Tolna | Szentgotthárdi | 494 | 9954 |
| Röszke | V | Csongrád | Szegedi | 3,299 | 6758 |
| Rudabánya | V | Borsod-Abaúj-Zemplén | Kazincbarcikai | 2,952 | 3733 |
| Rudolftelep | V | Borsod-Abaúj-Zemplén | Kazincbarcikai | 806 | 3742 |
| Rum | V | Vas | Szombathelyi | 1,280 | 9766 |
| Ruzsa | V | Csongrád | Mórahalmi | 2,824 | 6786 |

== Notes ==
- Cities marked with * have several different post codes, the one here is only the most general one.
