= Kapuvár District =

Kapuvár District Kapuvári járás
- Districts of Hungary
- Coat of arms

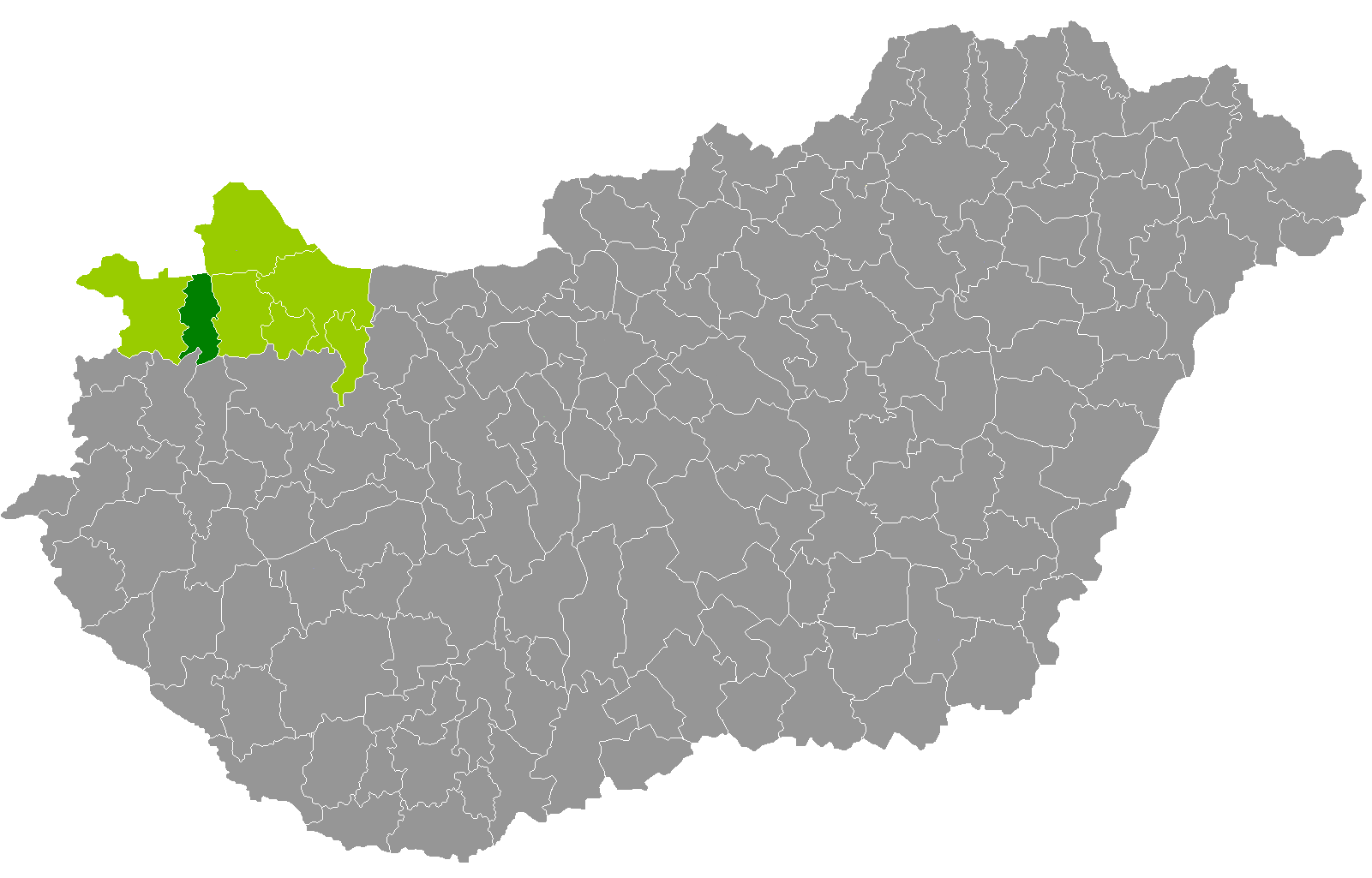
- Kapuvár District within Hungary and Győr-Moson-Sopron County.
- Coordinates: 47.59°N 17.02°E
- Country: Hungary
- County: Győr-Moson-Sopron
- District seat: Kapuvár

Area
  - Total: 372.14 km^{2} (143.68 sq mi)
  - Rank: 5th in Győr-Moson-Sopron

Population (2011 census)
  - Total: 23,778
  - Rank: 5th in Győr-Moson-Sopron
  - Density: 64/km^{2} (170/sq mi)

Kapuvár (Hungarian: Kapuvári járás) is a district in central-western part of Győr-Moson-Sopron County. Kapuvár is also the name of the town where the district seat is found. The district is located in the Western Transdanubia Statistical Region.

== Geography ==
Kapuvár District borders with the Austrian state of Burgenland to the north, Mosonmagyaróvár District and Csorna District to the east, Celldömölk District and Sárvár District (Vas County) to the south, Sopron District to the west. The number of the inhabited places in Kapuvár District is 19.

== Municipalities ==
The district has 2 towns and 17 villages. (ordered by population, as of 1 January 2012)

- Babót (1,097)
- **Beled** (2,553)
- Cirák (568)
- Dénesfa (363)
- Edve (106)
- Gyóró (419)
- Himod (595)
- Hövej (313)
- **Kapuvár** (10,353) – district seat
- Kisfalud (730)
- Mihályi (1,051)
- Osli (856)
- Rábakecöl (665)
- Répceszemere (256)
- Szárföld (897)
- Vadosfa (75)
- Vásárosfalu (157)
- Veszkény (913)
- Vitnyéd (1,359)

The bolded municipalities are cities.

== Demographics ==
Religion in Kapuvár District (2011 census)
1. Catholic Church (71.3%)
2. Greek Catholicism (0.10%)
3. Lutheranism (5.40%)
4. Calvinism (1.10%)
5. Other religions (0.70%)
6. Non-religious (2.30%)
7. Atheists (0.40%)
8. Undeclared (18.7%)

In 2011, it had a population of 23,778 and the population density was 64/km^{2}.

Year	County population	Change
2011	23,778	n/a

=== Ethnicity ===
Besides the Hungarian majority, the main minorities are the Roma and German (approx. 300-300).

Total population (2011 census): 23,778
Ethnic groups (2011 census): Identified themselves: 21,806 persons:

- Hungarians: 21,030 (96.44%)
- Gypsies: 318 (1.46%)
- Germans: 297 (1.36%)
- Others and indefinable: 161 (0.74%)

Approx. 2,000 persons in Kapuvár District did not declare their ethnic group at the 2011 census.

=== Religion ===
Religious adherence in the county according to 2011 census:

- Catholic – 16,983 (Roman Catholic – 16,948; Greek Catholic – 31);
- Evangelical – 1,298;
- Reformed – 253;
- other religions – 157;
- Non-religious – 546;
- Atheism – 101;
- Undeclared – 4,440.

== See also ==
- List of cities and towns in Hungary
