= List of populated places in Hungary (C) =

This is a list of cities, towns and villages of Hungary

KEY: T = Town ; V = Village

Name	Rank	County	District	Population	Post code
Cák	V	Vas	Koszegi	267	9725
Cakóháza	V	Gyor-Moson-Sopron	Csornai	62	9165
Cece	V	Fejér	Sárbogárdi	2,806	7013
Cégénydányád	V	Szabolcs-Szatmár-Bereg	Fehérgyarmati	735	4732
Cegléd	T	Pest	Ceglédi	38,048	2700
Ceglédbercel	V	Pest	Ceglédi	4,548	2737
Celldömölk	T	Vas	Celldömölki	11,553	9500
Cered	V	Nógrád	Salgótarjáni	1,246	3123
Chernelházadamonya	V	Vas	Csepregi	218	9624
Cibakháza	V	Jász-Nagykun-Szolnok	Kunszentmártoni	4,641	5462
Cigánd	V	Borsod-Abaúj-Zemplén	Bodrogközi	3,225	3973
Cikó	V	Tolna	Bonyhádi	968	7161
Cirák	V	Gyor-Moson-Sopron	Kapuvári	644	9364
Cún	V	Baranya	Siklósi	258	7843

== Notes ==
- Cities marked with * have several different post codes, the one here is only the most general one.
