= Szily =

Szily or Szili is a Hungarian habitational surname for someone from the village Szil. Notable persons with the surname include:

- János Szily (1735-1799), Hungarian Bishop
- József Szily (1913–1976), Hungarian chess master
- Katalin Szili (born 1956), Hungarian politician
- Pál Szily (1878–1945), Hungarian chemist
