= Alpár Gyopáros =

Hungarian politician (born 1978)

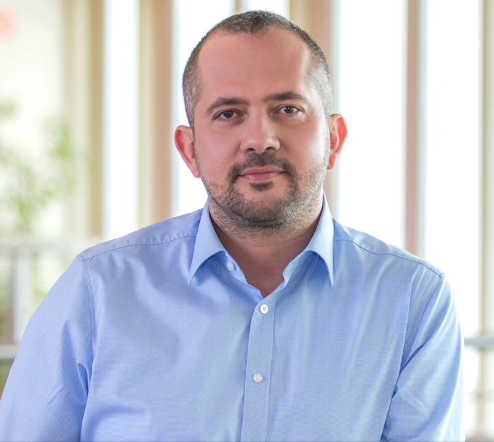

Member of the National Assembly
- Incumbent
- Assumed office 30 November 2009

Personal details
- Born: Alpár Ádám Gyopáros; 15 May 1978 (age 48) Szombathely, Hungary
- Party: Fidesz (since 2002)
- Spouse: Veronika Gyopáros
- Profession: politician

Alpár Ádám Gyopáros (born 15 May 1978) is a Hungarian politician and member of the National Assembly (MP) for Csorna (Győr-Moson-Sopron County Constituency V then III) since 2009.

== Political career ==
He became a Member of Parliament after a by-election in 2009, when János Áder was elected to the European Parliament and resigned from his national seat. Gyopáros won the mandate with more than 80 percent. He was a member of the Parliamentary Committee for Employment and Labour until the end of the 5th legislative term.

Gyopáros secured MP for Csorna again in the Hungarian parliamentary elections in 2010. He became a member of the Committee on European Affairs. He was re-elected in 2014 and 2018. Gyopáros was appointed Government Commissioner for the Development of Modern Cities and Villages in May 2018, replacing minister without portfolio Lajos Kósa in this capacity.

=== Controversy ===
In September 2010, before the local elections, a recording in the possession of website Stop.hu contained Fidesz-backed independent candidates for local council posts in Kóny, Győr-Moson-Sopron County discussed asking László Domokos, State Audit Office chief and Alpár Gyopáros to help them discredit Socialist Party-backed mayor Imre Aller. The sound recording allegedly contained local councillor Tamás Ágoston saying “everybody is knocking (on Fidesz member Gyopáros’s) door to ask how to blackmail Aller”. He also mentioned MEP János Áder as a possible helper in a potential blackmail attempt.

Socialist MP Csaba Molnár described the events as “an unprecedented blackmail attempt in the 20-year history of the Hungarian Republic”. Fidesz deputy chairman Lajos Kósa said his party condemns this conduct, adding that those heard in the recording were not nominated by Fidesz. Gyopáros denied having spoken to those featured in the sound recording and told Népszabadság that he had received an apology over the phone.

== Personal life ==
He is married. His wife is Veronika Gyopáros.
