= Joli Jászai =

Hungarian actress and entertainer

- Born: 21 May 1907; Rábatamási, Austria-Hungary
- Died: 26 September 2008 (aged 101); Piliscsaba, Hungary
- Occupations: Actress; entertainer

Joli Jászai (21 May 1907 – 26 September 2008) was a Hungarian actress and entertainer. She began her film career relatively late in life.

Jászai was born in Rábatamási, Austria-Hungary, in what is now the Republic of Hungary, on 21 May 1907. She died in Piliscsaba, Hungary, on 26 September 2008, at the age of 101.

== Filmography ==
- Mamiblu (1986)
- Csók, Anyu! (1986)
- Szerelem első vérig (1986) – Gizike néni, Ágota nagyanyja
- Hol volt, hol nem volt (1987) – idős nő
- Szerelem második vérig (1988) – Mamó
- Ismeretlen ismerős (1989) – Találttárgyak őrzője
- Napló apámnak, anyámnak (1990)
- Szerelmes szívek (1991) – Timi nagymamája
- Édes Emma, drága Böbe – vázlatok, aktok (1992)
- Sztracsatella (1996) – Borzsa
- „A Szórád-ház” (1997) TV – Öregasszony
- Szerelem utolsó vérig (2002) – Gizike néni
