= Czarni =

Czarni, means "The Blacks" in the Polish language, and is a name commonly given to Polish sports teams, including:

- Czarni Dęblin, men's association football club
- Czarni Jasło, men's association football club
- Czarni Lwów, men's association football club
- Czarni Olecko, men's association football club
- Czarni Pruszcz Gdański, association football and rugby union club
- Czarni Radom, men's volleyball club
- Czarni Słupsk, men's basketball club
- Czarni Sosnowiec, men's association football club
- Czarni Wierzchosławice, men's association football club
- Czarni Żagań, men's association football club

== See also ==
- Czarna (disambiguation)
