= Bágyogszovát =

- Flag Coat of arms

- Location within Hungary
- Coordinates: 47.5895°N 17.3604°E
- Country: Hungary
- County: Győr-Moson-Sopron County

Area
  - Total: 24.06 km^{2} (9.29 sq mi)

Population (2012)
  - Total: 1,284
- Postal code: 9145
- Area code: 96
- Motorways: M85
- Distance from Budapest: 154 km (96 mi) East

Bágyogszovát is a municipality in Győr-Moson-Sopron county, Hungary. It is in the north-western region, 35 kilometers from Győr, in the direction of Sopron.

== History ==
The first known written records of Bágyogszovát are from the 13th century. According to those documents, the first part of the village was founded in 1224, and was named Zooac. This name was changed to Szovát during later centuries.

The village was the property of the bishop of Győr for more than five centuries. The other part of the village, Bágyog was founded later, but the exact date is not known. It was originally called Baguc. The two parts of the village were joined soon after World War II creating Bágyogszovát.

== Traffic ==
Bágyogszovát is near Route 85, the main route of the county.

The 7059 bus connects Bágyogszovát to Györ, while the 7110 bus connects Bágyogszovát to Csorna.

In 2024, a new roundabout was completed in Bágyogszovát at the cemetery of Szovát village.
