= Barbacs =

- Flag Coat of arms

- Location of Győr-Moson-Sopron county in Hungary

- Location of Barbacs
- Coordinates: 47.646°N 17.29676°E
- Country: Hungary
- County: Győr-Moson-Sopron

Area
  - Total: 13.65 km^{2} (5.27 sq mi)

Population (2004)
  - Total: 763
  - Density: 55.89/km^{2} (144.8/sq mi)
- Time zone: UTC+1 (CET)
  - Summer (DST): UTC+2 (CEST)
- Postal code: 9169
- Area code: 96
- Motorways: M85
- Distance from Budapest: 151 km (94 mi) East

Barbacs is a village in Győr-Moson-Sopron county, Hungary. As of 2016, the village had 614 eligible voters.
