= Raposka =

- Location of Veszprém county in Hungary

- Location of Raposka
- Coordinates: 46.84901°N 17.42548°E
- Country: Hungary
- County: Veszprém

Area
  - Total: 4.9 km^{2} (1.9 sq mi)

Population (2004)
  - Total: 254
  - Density: 51.83/km^{2} (134.2/sq mi)
- Time zone: UTC+1 (CET)
  - Summer (DST): UTC+2 (CEST)
- Postal code: 8300
- Area code: 87

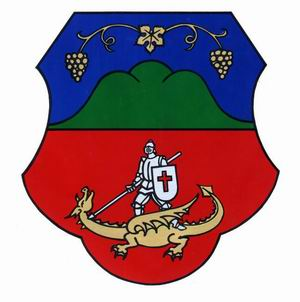
Coat of arms of Raposka Hungary

Raposka is a village in Veszprém county, Hungary.
