= Bogyoszló =

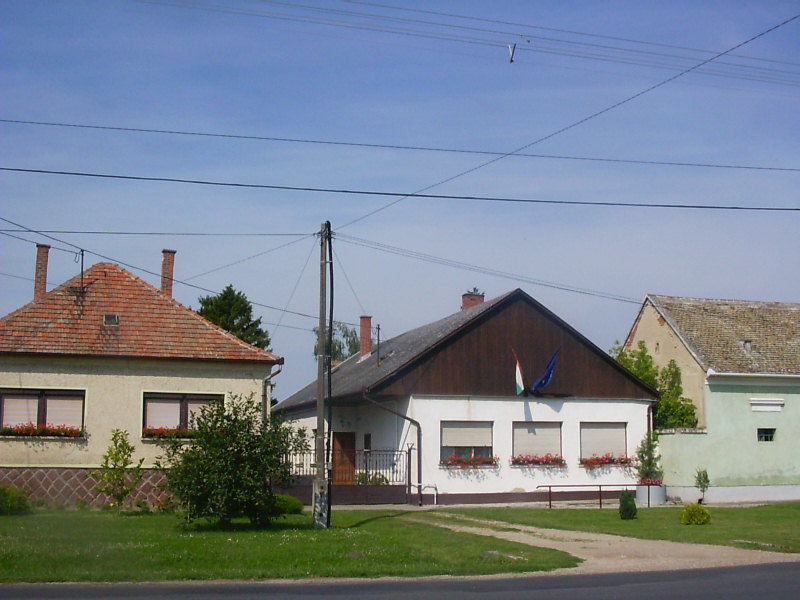
- Village hall

- Flag Coat of arms

- Location of Győr-Moson-Sopron county in Hungary

- Location of Bogyoszló
- Coordinates: 47.56163°N 17.18630°E
- Country: Hungary
- County: Győr-Moson-Sopron

Area
  - Total: 26.21 km^{2} (10.12 sq mi)

Population (2004)
  - Total: 628
  - Density: 23.96/km^{2} (62.1/sq mi)
- Time zone: UTC+1 (CET)
  - Summer (DST): UTC+2 (CEST)
- Postal code: 9324
- Area code: 96

Bogyoszló (Hungarian pronunciation: [ˈboɟosloː]) is a village in Győr-Moson-Sopron county, Hungary.

The community is served by the 7074 bus from Györ, as well as well as the 7140 bus from Csorna.
