= Bősárkány =

- Large village
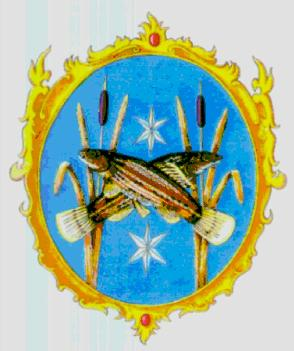
- Coat of arms

- Location of Győr-Moson-Sopron county in Hungary

- Location of Bősárkány
- Coordinates: 47.68836°N 17.24792°E
- Country: Hungary
- County: Győr-Moson-Sopron
- District: Csorna

Area
  - Total: 23.32 km^{2} (9.00 sq mi)

Population (2019)
  - Total: 2,151
  - Density: 94.04/km^{2} (243.6/sq mi)
- Time zone: UTC+1 (CET)
  - Summer (DST): UTC+2 (CEST)
- Postal code: 9167
- Area code: (+36) 96

Bősárkány is a village in Győr-Moson-Sopron county, Hungary.
