= Fehértó =

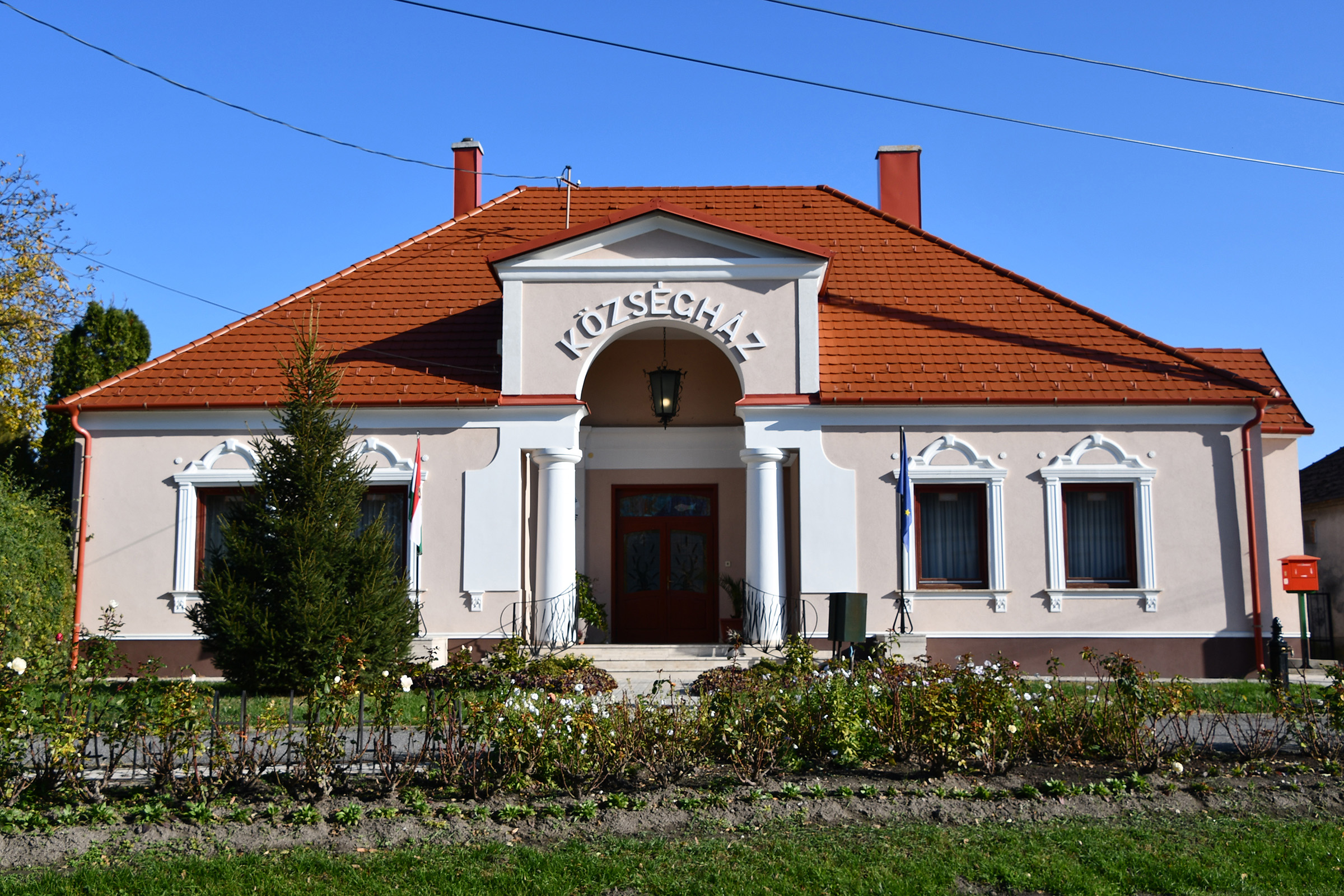
- Village hall

- Flag Coat of arms

- Location of Győr-Moson-Sopron county in Hungary

- Location of Fehértó
- Coordinates: 47.67605°N 17.34412°E
- Country: Hungary
- County: Győr-Moson-Sopron

Area
  - Total: 11.38 km^{2} (4.39 sq mi)

Population (2004)
  - Total: 495
  - Density: 43.49/km^{2} (112.6/sq mi)
- Time zone: UTC+1 (CET)
  - Summer (DST): UTC+2 (CEST)
- Postal code: 9163
- Area code: 96

Fehértó is a village in Győr-Moson-Sopron county, Hungary.
