= Dör =

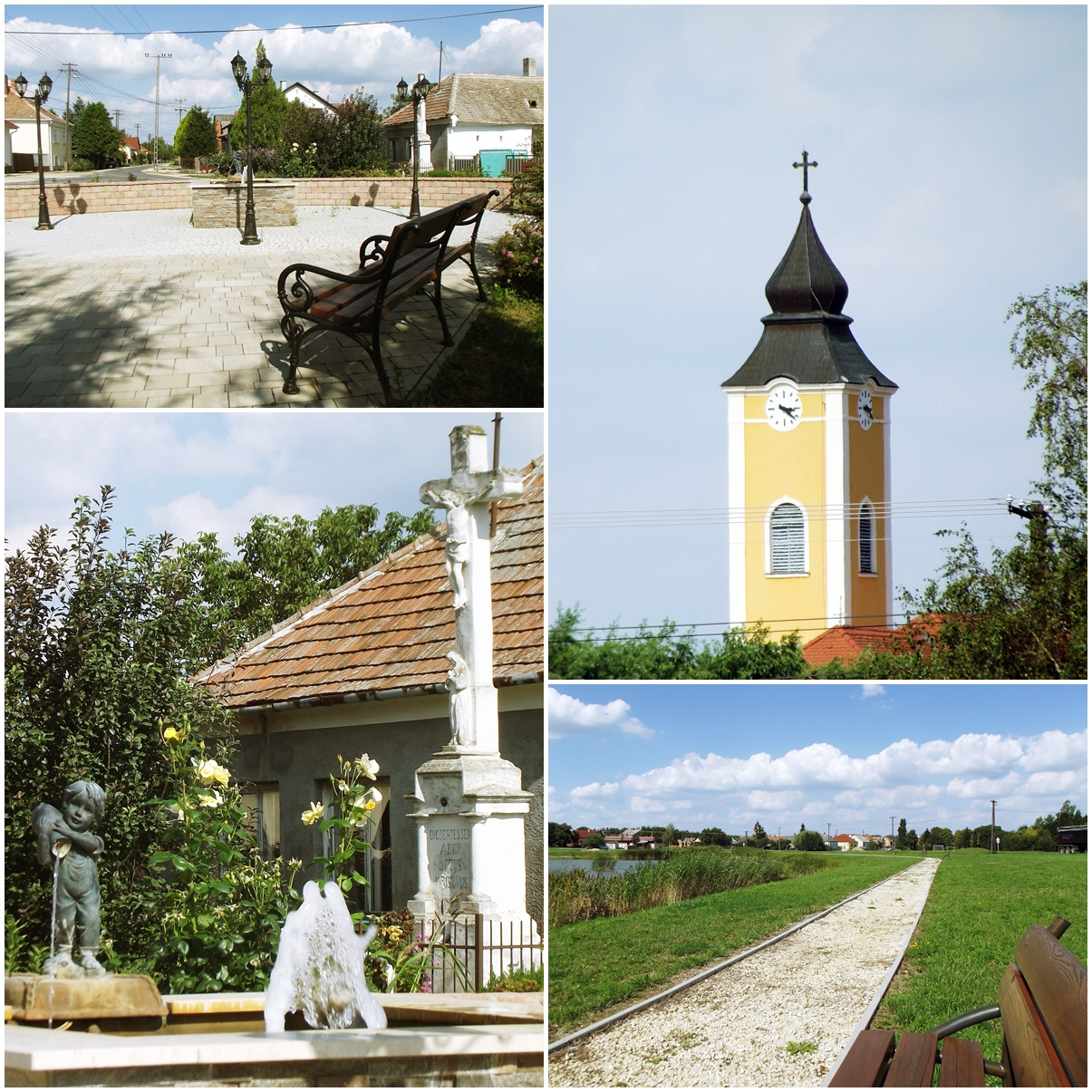

- Flag Coat of arms

- Location of Győr-Moson-Sopron county in Hungary

- Location of Dör
- Coordinates: 47.59802°N 17.29897°E
- Country: Hungary
- County: Győr-Moson-Sopron

Area
  - Total: 11.01 km^{2} (4.25 sq mi)

Population (2004)
  - Total: 628
  - Density: 57.03/km^{2} (147.7/sq mi)
- Time zone: UTC+1 (CET)
  - Summer (DST): UTC+2 (CEST)
- Postal code: 9147
- Area code: 96
- Motorways: M85
- Distance from Budapest: 155 km (96 mi) East

Dör is a village in Győr-Moson-Sopron county, Hungary.
