= Zlaté Klasy =

Zlaté Klasy Nagymagyar
- Municipality
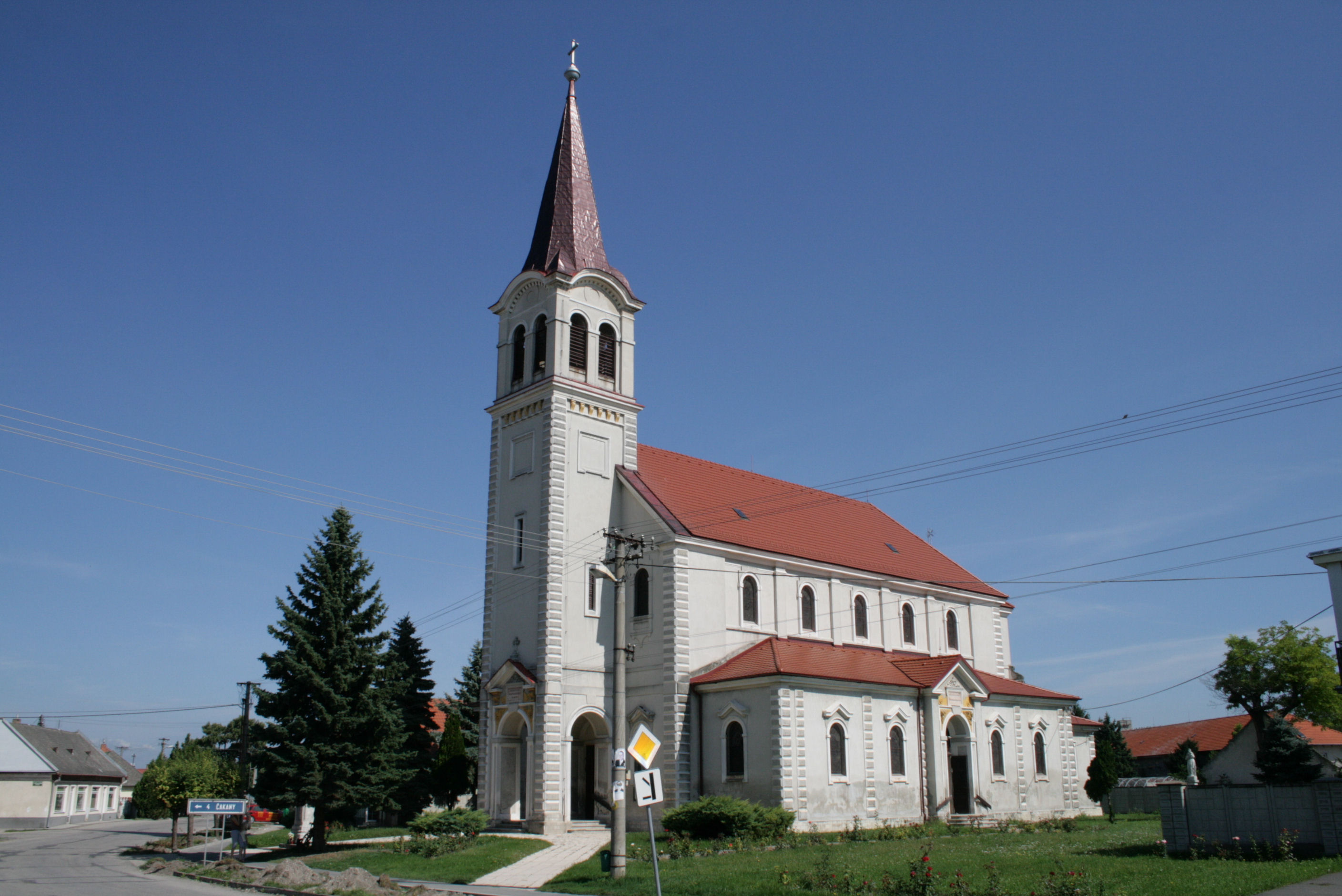
- Church of the Holy Cross

- Flag

- Location of Zlaté Klasy in the Trnava Region Location of Zlaté Klasy in Slovakia
- Coordinates: 48.12°N 17.42°E
- Country: Slovakia
- Region: Trnava Region
- District: Dunajská Streda District
- First mentioned: 1352

Government
  - Mayor: Marek Rigó (RIS)

Area
  - Total: 17.99 km^{2} (6.95 sq mi)
- Elevation: 122 m (400 ft)

Population (2025)
  - Total: 3,561

Ethnicity
  - Hungarians: 67.68%
  - Slovaks: 24.55%
- Time zone: UTC+1 (CET)
  - Summer (DST): UTC+2 (CEST)
- Postal code: 930 39
- Area code: +421 31
- Vehicle registration plate (until 2022): DS
- Website: www.zlateklasy.sk

Zlaté Klasy (formerly Veľký Mager Hungarian: Nagymagyar, pronounced [ˈnɒɟmɒɟɒr]) is a village and municipality in the Dunajská Streda District in the Trnava Region of south-west Slovakia.

== Component villages ==
In Slovak	In Hungarian
Rastice	Nagymagyar
Maslovce	Vajasvata
Nový Trh	Újvásár

== Geography ==
The municipality lies at an altitude of 122 metres (400 ft) and covers an area of 17.99 km^{2} (6.95 sq mi) (2025).

== History ==
In the 9th century, the territory of Zlaté Klasy became part of the Kingdom of Hungary. From the end of the 9th century until the end of World War I, the village was part of Hungary and fell within the Somorja district of Pozsony County.

The village was first recorded in 1239 by its Hungarian name as "Mogor". In 1281, it was mentioned as "Magari", while in 1354 as "Egyhazasmagyary". The village first belonged to the Pozsony Castle, later it became the possession of noble families. Since the 17th century, much of the village was the property of the Poor Clares and the order managed several of its estates from this village.

After the Austro-Hungarian army disintegrated in November 1918, Czechoslovak troops occupied the area. After the Treaty of Trianon of 1920, the village became officially part of Czechoslovakia. In November 1938, the First Vienna Award granted the area to Hungary, and it was held by Hungary until 1945. After Soviet occupation in 1945, Czechoslovak administration returned and the village became officially part of Czechoslovakia in 1947. The present-day municipality was formed in 1960 by the unification of the component villages.

== Population ==
Population statistic (10 years)
Year	1995	2005	2015	2025
Count	3195	3636	3597	3561
Difference		+13.80%	−1.07%	−1.00%

Population statistic
Year	2024	2025
Count	3542	3561
Difference		+0.53%

It has a population of 3561 people (31 December 2025).

=== Ethnicity ===
Census 2021 (1+ %)
Ethnicity	Number	Fraction
Slovak	1326	36.72%
Hungarian	1207	33.42%
Romani	1105	30.6%
Not found out	363	10.05%
Total	3611	

In year 2021 was 3611 people by ethnicity 1326 as Slovak, 1207 as Hungarian, 1105 as Romani, 363 as Not found out, 10 as Czech, 3 as Italian, 3 as Other, 3 as Greek, 2 as Austrian, 2 as German, 1 as Serbian, 1 as Rusyn, 1 as Russian, 1 as French and 1 as English.

Note on population: The difference values of population numbers in the table "Population statistic" and in the sections "Ethnicity" & "Religion" is caused by the use of various statistical methods.

A majority of the municipality's population consists of the local Roma community. In 2019, they constituted an estimated 63% of the local population.

=== Religion ===
Census 2021 (1+ %)
Religion	Number	Fraction
Roman Catholic Church	2852	78.98%
Not found out	332	9.19%
None	269	7.45%
Christian Congregations in Slovakia	49	1.36%
Total	3611	

In year 2021 was 3611 people by religion 2852 from Roman Catholic Church, 332 from Not found out, 269 from None, 49 from Christian Congregations in Slovakia, 29 from Evangelical Church, 27 from Greek Catholic Church, 21 from Calvinist Church, 11 from Jehovah's Witnesses, 6 from Other and not ascertained christian church, 4 from Islam, 3 from Old Catholic Church, 3 from Eastern Orthodox Church, 2 from United Methodist Church, 1 from Other, 1 from Buddhism and 1 from Ad hoc movements.

In 1910, the village had 1325, for the most part, Hungarian inhabitants. At the 2001 Census the recorded population of the village was 3475 while an end-2008 estimate by the Statistical Office was 3529. As of 2001, 92.67% of its population were Hungarians while 7.09% were Slovaks.

Roman Catholicism is the majority religion of the village, its adherents numbering 94.01% of the total population.

== Twinnings ==
The village is twinned with

- Ecser, Hungary
