= Rábatöttös =

- Coat of arms

- Location of Rábatöttös in Hungary
- Coordinates: 47°07′08″N 16°48′30″E
- Country: Hungary
- Region: Western Transdanubia
- County: Vas
- Subregion: Szombathelyi
- Rank: Village

Area
  - Total: 6.48 km^{2} (2.50 sq mi)

Population (1 January 2008)
  - Total: 224
  - Density: 34.6/km^{2} (89.5/sq mi)
- Time zone: UTC+1 (CET)
  - Summer (DST): UTC+2 (CEST)
- Postal code: 9766
- Area code: +36 94
- KSH code: 17996
- Website: www.rabatottos.hu

Rábatöttös is a village in Vas county, Hungary.
