= Rigács =

- Flag Coat of arms

- Location of Veszprém county in Hungary

- Location of Rigács
- Coordinates: 47.06240°N 17.1925°E
- Country: Hungary
- County: Veszprém

Area
  - Total: 6.17 km^{2} (2.38 sq mi)

Population (2004)
  - Total: 191
  - Density: 30.95/km^{2} (80.2/sq mi)
- Time zone: UTC+1 (CET)
  - Summer (DST): UTC+2 (CEST)
- Postal code: 8348
- Area code: 87

Rigács is a village in Veszprém county, Hungary.
