= Czarna =

Czarna may refer to the following places:

- Czarna, Lesser Poland Voivodeship (south Poland)
- Czarna, Łódź Voivodeship (central Poland)
- Czarna, Lublin Voivodeship (east Poland)
- Czarna, Dębica County in Subcarpathian Voivodeship (south-east Poland)
- Czarna, Kielce County in Świętokrzyskie Voivodeship (south-central Poland)
- Czarna, Końskie County in Świętokrzyskie Voivodeship (south-central Poland)
- Czarna, Łańcut County in Subcarpathian Voivodeship (south-east Poland)
- Czarna, Bieszczady County in Subcarpathian Voivodeship (south-east Poland)
- Czarna, Mińsk County in Masovian Voivodeship (east-central Poland)
- Czarna, Gmina Zakroczym, Nowy Dwór County in Masovian Voivodeship (east-central Poland)
- Czarna, Wołomin County in Masovian Voivodeship (east-central Poland)
- Czarna, Lubusz Voivodeship (west Poland)

== Other uses ==
- Czarna, tributary of the Łęg, in Subcarpathian Voivodeship (south-eastern Poland)

== See also ==
- Czarni (disambiguation)
