= Czarni Wierzchosławice =

Polish football club

- Full name: Ludowy Zespół Sportowy Czarni Wierzchosławice
- Nickname(s): Wierzchołki
- Founded: 1953; 72 years ago
- Ground: Wierzchosławice, Poland
- Chairman: Paweł Brzusztowicz
- Manager: Vacant
- League: Klasa A, group: Bydgoszcz
- 2022–23: Klasa B, group: Bydgoszcz V, 1st of 11 (promoted)
Home colours	Away colours

Ludowy Zespół Sportowy Czarni Wierzchosławice is a football club from Wierzchosławice, Poland. It was founded in 1953. The club currently plays in Klasa A.
