= Pál Szily =

Pál von Szily (16 May 1878 – 18 August 1945) was a Hungarian physician and chemist who contributed to the development of the pH scale.

Pál von Szily was born in Budapest to the ophthalmologist Adolf Szily who was a director of the Jewish Hospital in Budapest. For his contribution to ophthalmology, he had been given the title of von Szily by Franz Joseph I. Educated in medicine at the University of Budapest Szily received a degree in medicine in 1902 and joined as an assistant in the Institute of Physiology in Budapest. His younger brother Aurel trained as an ophthalmologist. Pal examined artificial buffer solutions and indicators for the determination of the hydrogen ion concentration under Hans Friedenthal in Berlin and published the results in 1903. This contributed to the development of the pH scale by Søren Sørensen in 1909. He examined the use of Salvarsan along with Paul Ehrlich and after World War I, he worked on chemotherapy. In 1944 he was sent to a concentration camp near Győr as a Jew. He was however able to leave and escape transport to Germany through the influence of his contacts. He however suffered as his diabetes had been poorly managed during his incarceration and he died within a year.
