= Répceszentgyörgy =

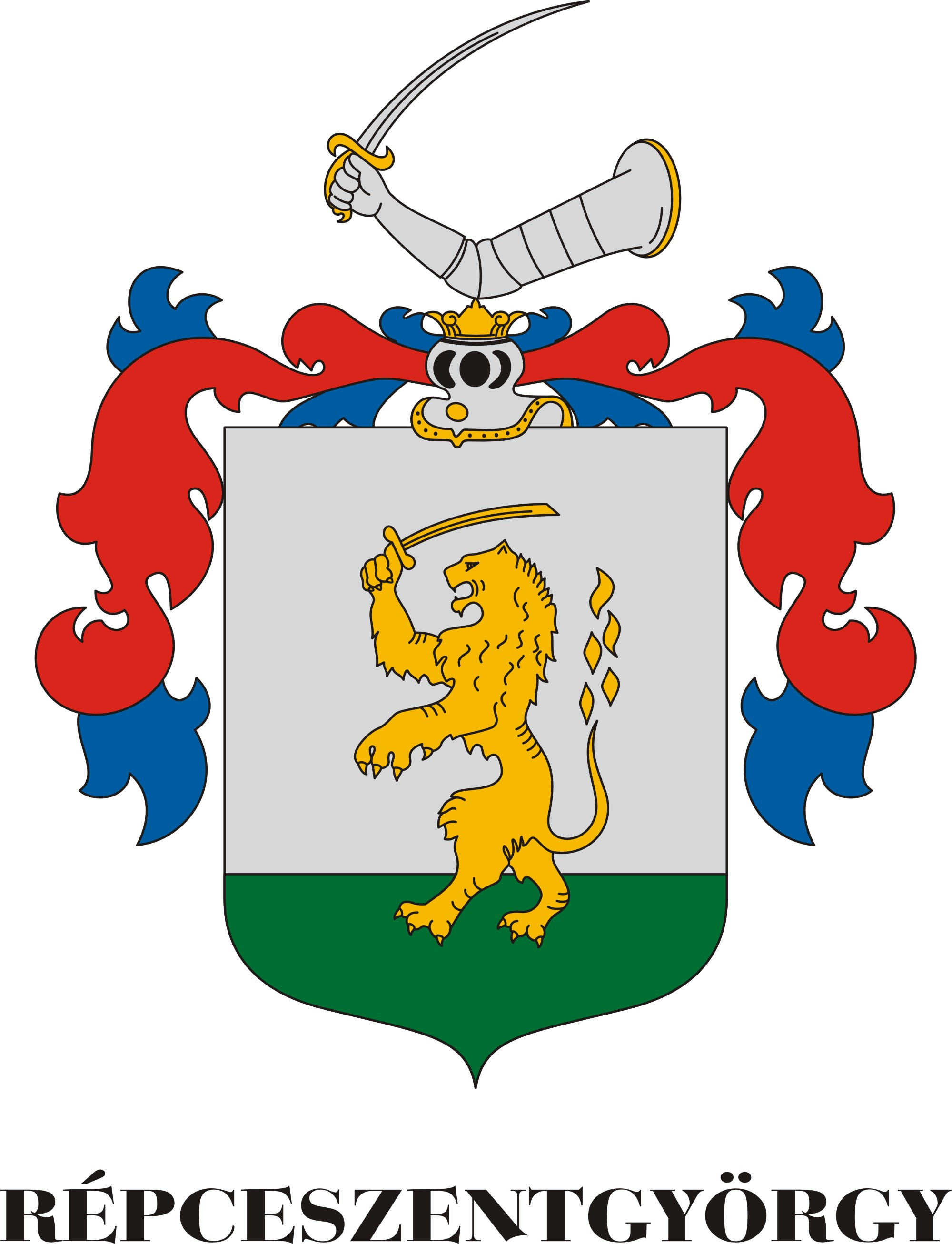
- Coat of arms

- Location of Vas county in Hungary

- Location of Répceszentgyörgy
- Coordinates: 47.35196°N 16.84617°E
- Country: Hungary
- County: Vas

Area
  - Total: 5.75 km^{2} (2.22 sq mi)

Population (2004)
  - Total: 128
  - Density: 22.26/km^{2} (57.7/sq mi)
- Time zone: UTC+1 (CET)
  - Summer (DST): UTC+2 (CEST)
- Postal code: 9623
- Area code: 95

Répceszentgyörgy is a village in Vas county, Hungary. The village is known for hosting a baroque-style castle from 1780, Szentgyörgyi-Horváth Castle.
