= Szany =

- Large village
- Flag Coat of arms

- Location of Győr-Moson-Sopron county in Hungary

- Location of Szany
- Coordinates: 47.46105°N 17.30112°E
- Country: Hungary
- County: Győr-Moson-Sopron
- District: Csorna

Area
  - Total: 34.14 km^{2} (13.18 sq mi)

Population (2019)
  - Total: 2,055
  - Density: 66.26/km^{2} (171.6/sq mi)
- Time zone: UTC+1 (CET)
  - Summer (DST): UTC+2 (CEST)
- Postal code: 9317
- Area code: (+36) 96
- Website: szany.hu

Szany is a large village in Győr-Moson-Sopron county, Hungary.

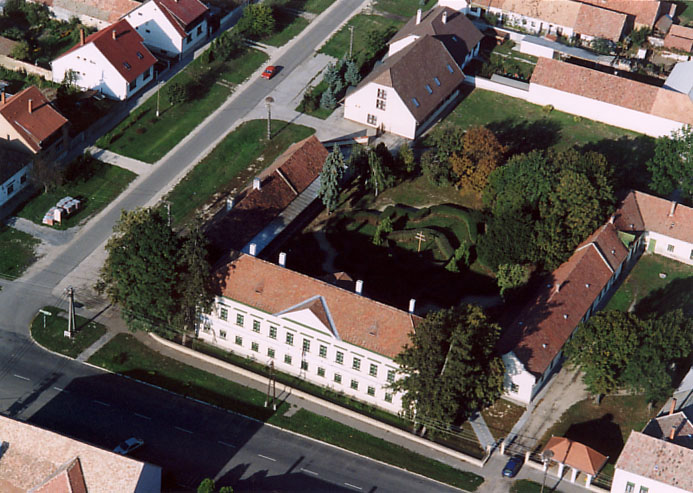
Aerial photography of Szany

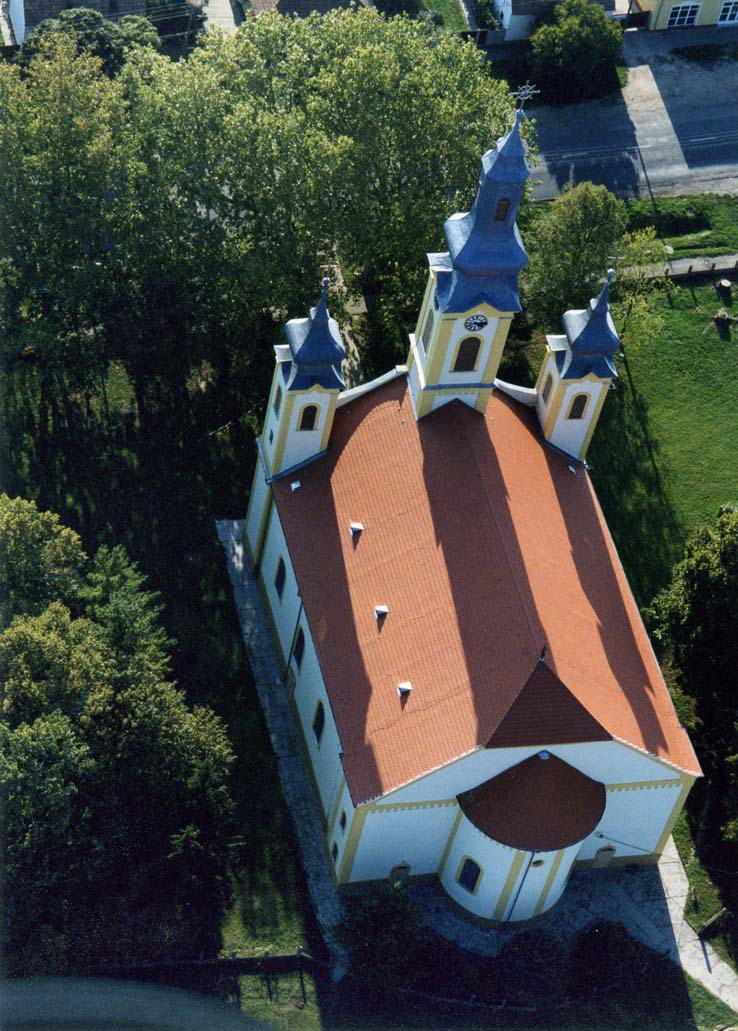
