= Zsebeháza =

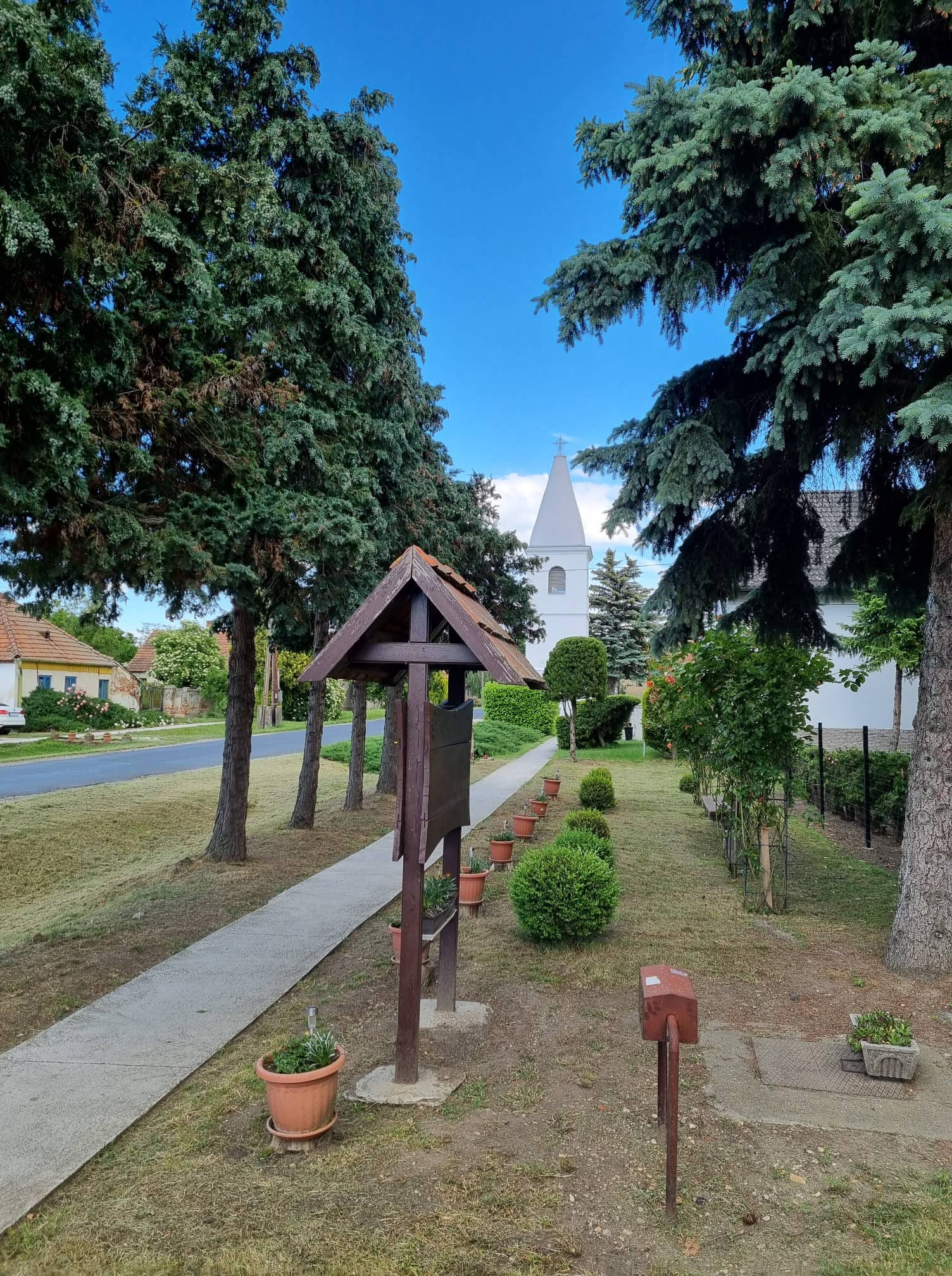
- The main street of the village with the bell tower

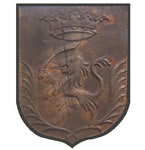
- Coat of arms

- Location of Zsebeháza
- Coordinates: 47.5167°N 17.2000°E
- Country: Hungary
- County: Győr-Moson-Sopron

Government
  - Mayor: Kovátsits Zoltánné (Ind.)

Area
  - Total: 4.65 km^{2} (1.80 sq mi)

Population (2022)
  - Total: 134
  - Density: 28.8/km^{2} (74.6/sq mi)
- Time zone: UTC+1 (CET)
  - Summer (DST): UTC+2 (CEST)
- Postal code: 9346
- Area code: 96
- Motorways: M86
- Distance from Budapest: 167 km (104 mi) East

Zsebeháza is a village in Győr-Moson-Sopron County, Hungary.
