= Bodonhely =

- Flag Coat of arms

- Location of Bodonhely in Hungary
- Coordinates: 47.5638°N 17.4063°E
- Country: Hungary
- Region: Western Transdanubia
- County: Győr-Moson-Sopron

Area
  - Total: 11.1 km^{2} (4.3 sq mi)

Population (2012)
  - Total: 277
  - Density: 25.0/km^{2} (64.6/sq mi)
- Time zone: UTC+1 (CET)
  - Summer (DST): UTC+2 (CEST)
- Postal code: 9134
- Area code: +36 96
- Website: http://bodonhely.hu/

Bodonhely is a village in Győr-Moson-Sopron county, Hungary.
