= Potyond =

- Flag Coat of arms

- Location of Győr-Moson-Sopron county in Hungary

- Location of Potyond
- Coordinates: 47.54948°N 17.18174°E
- Country: Hungary
- County: Győr-Moson-Sopron

Area
  - Total: 2.84 km^{2} (1.10 sq mi)

Population (2004)
  - Total: 97
  - Density: 34.15/km^{2} (88.4/sq mi)
- Time zone: UTC+1 (CET)
  - Summer (DST): UTC+2 (CEST)
- Postal code: 9324
- Area code: 96

Potyond (Hungarian pronunciation: [ˈpocond]) is a village in Győr-Moson-Sopron county, Hungary.
