= Páli =

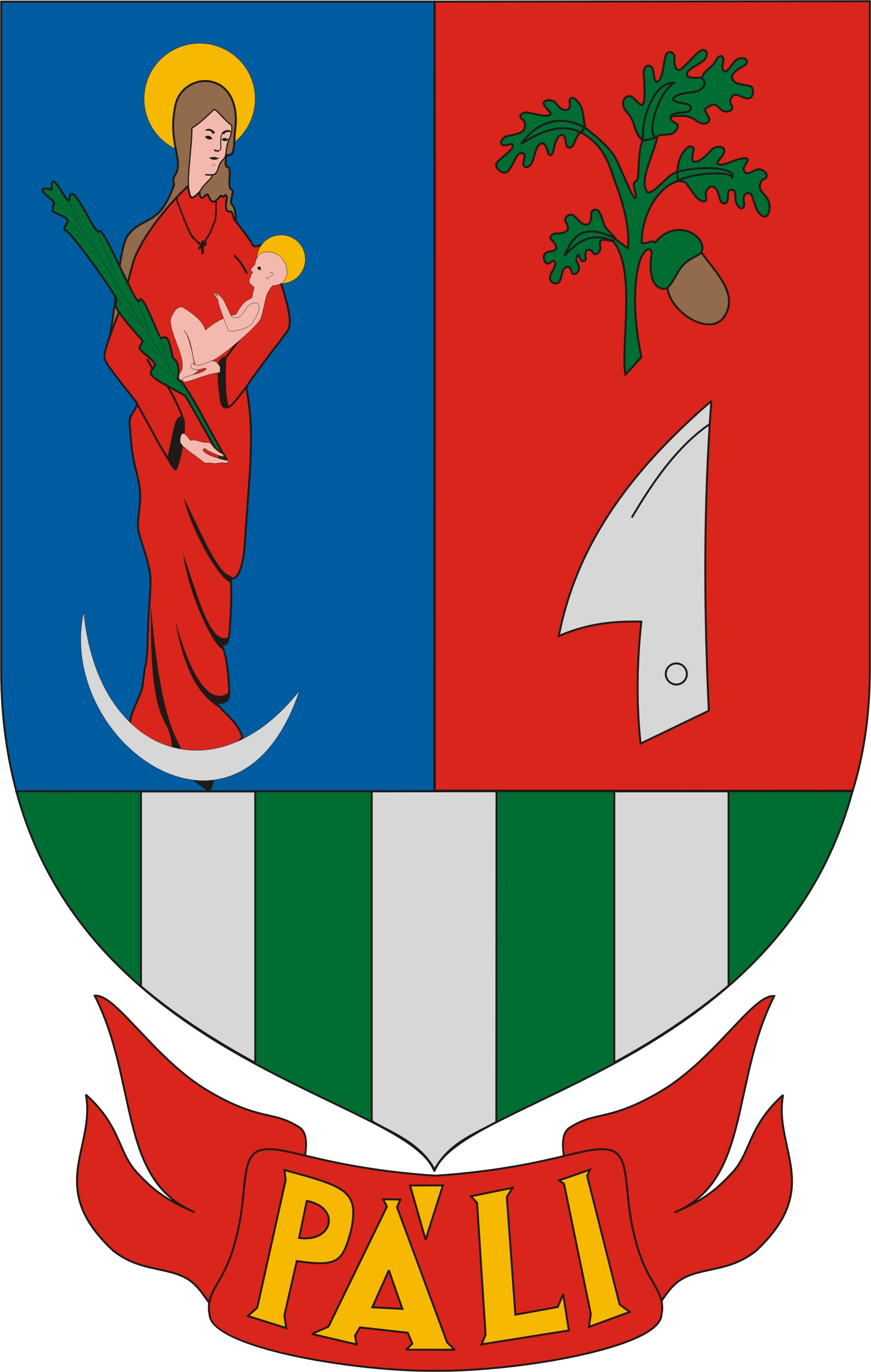
- Coat of arms

- Location of Győr-Moson-Sopron county in Hungary

- Location of Páli
- Coordinates: 47.47725°N 17.16808°E
- Country: Hungary
- County: Győr-Moson-Sopron

Area
  - Total: 19.57 km^{2} (7.56 sq mi)

Population (2004)
  - Total: 387
  - Density: 19.77/km^{2} (51.2/sq mi)
- Time zone: UTC+1 (CET)
  - Summer (DST): UTC+2 (CEST)
- Postal code: 9345
- Area code: 96
- Motorways: M86
- Distance from Budapest: 173 km (107 mi) East

Páli is a village in Győr-Moson-Sopron county, Hungary.
