= Tárnokréti =

- Village
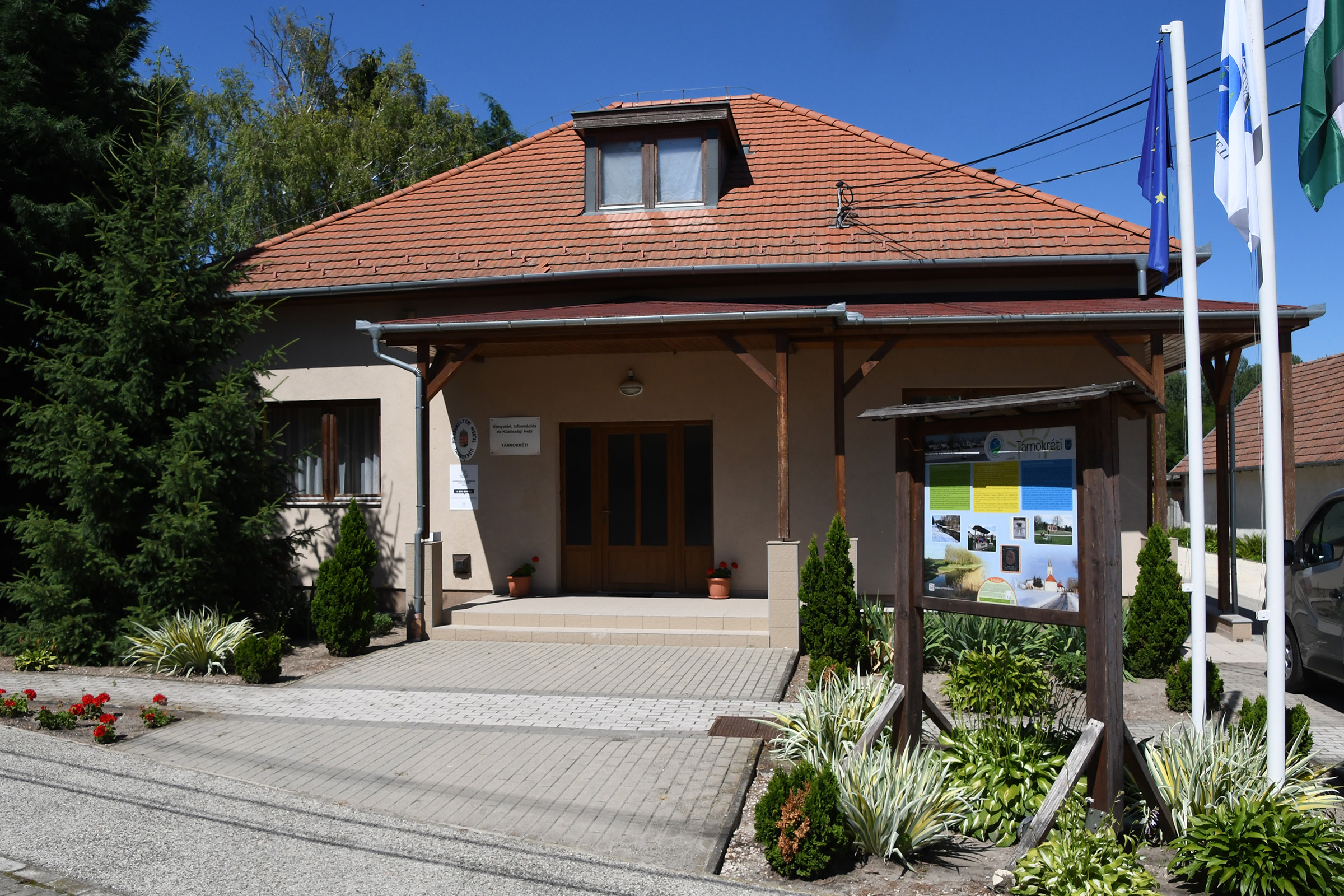
- Village hall

- Flag Coat of arms

- Location of Tárnokréti
- Coordinates: 47.7167°N 17.3167°E
- Country: Hungary
- County: Győr-Moson-Sopron

Area
  - Total: 9.54 km^{2} (3.68 sq mi)

Population (2025)
  - Total: 166
  - Density: 17.4/km^{2} (45.1/sq mi)
- Time zone: UTC+1 (CET)
  - Summer (DST): UTC+2 (CEST)
- Postal code: 9165

Tárnokréti is a village in Győr-Moson-Sopron County, Hungary.
