= Vág, Hungary =

Vág
- Flag Coat of arms

- Location of Vág
- Coordinates: 47.44735°N 17.21163°E
- Country: Hungary
- County: Győr-Moson-Sopron

Government
  - Mayor: Pálffy Attila (Ind.)

Area
  - Total: 14.03 km^{2} (5.42 sq mi)

Population (2022)
  - Total: 486
  - Density: 34.6/km^{2} (89.7/sq mi)
- Time zone: UTC+1 (CET)
  - Summer (DST): UTC+2 (CEST)
- Postal code: 9327
- Area code: 96

Vág is a village in Győr-Moson-Sopron County, Hungary.
