= Cakóháza =

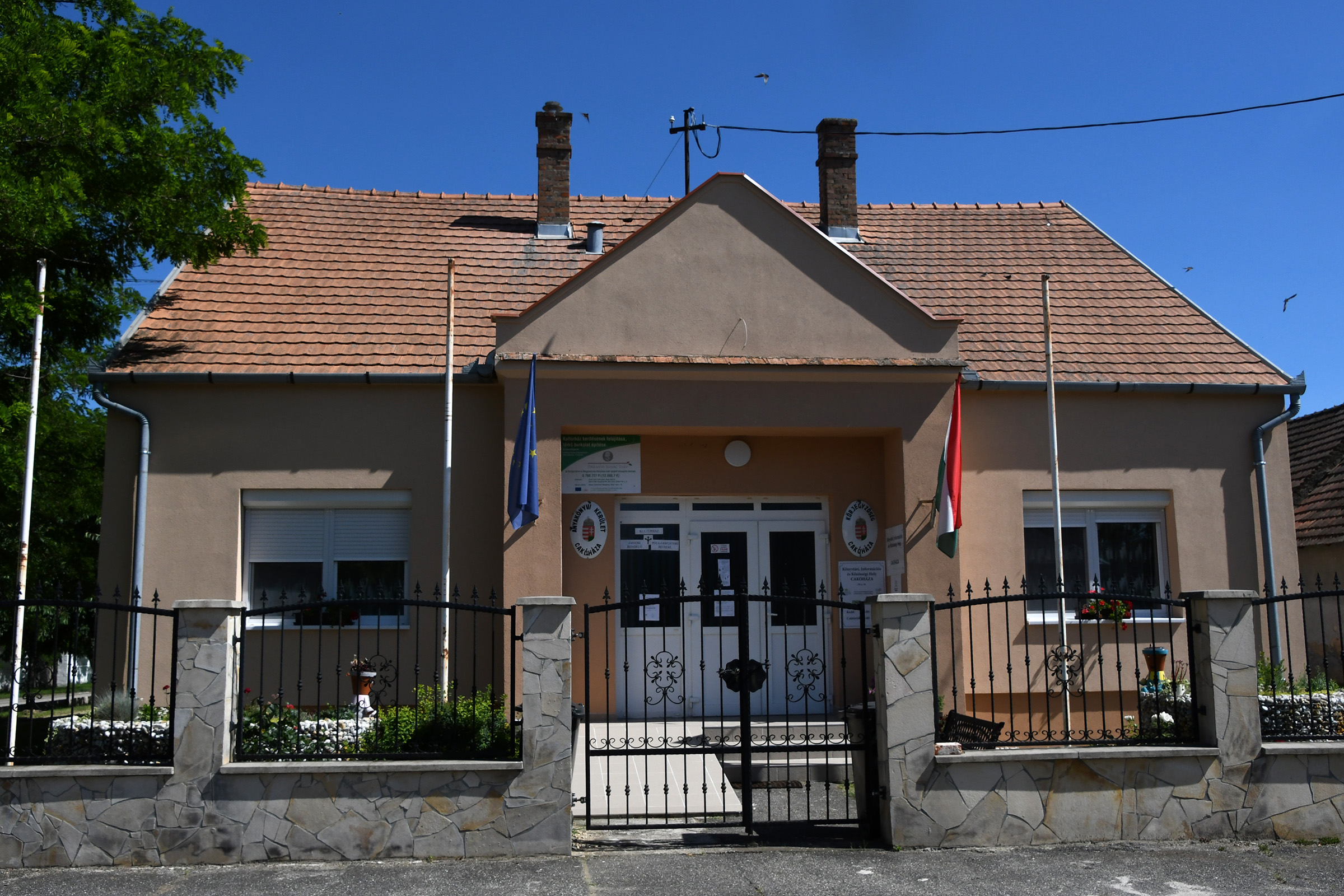
- Village hall

- Coat of arms

- Location of Győr-Moson-Sopron county in Hungary

- Location of Cakóháza
- Coordinates: 47.69660°N 17.28609°E
- Country: Hungary
- County: Győr-Moson-Sopron

Area
  - Total: 2.88 km^{2} (1.11 sq mi)

Population (2004)
  - Total: 60
  - Density: 20.83/km^{2} (53.9/sq mi)
- Time zone: UTC+1 (CET)
  - Summer (DST): UTC+2 (CEST)
- Postal code: 9165
- Area code: 96

Cakóháza is a village in Győr-Moson-Sopron county, Hungary.
