= Sobor, Hungary =

Sobor
- Flag Coat of arms

- Location of Győr-Moson-Sopron county in Hungary

- Location of Sobor, Hungary
- Coordinates: 47.47704°N 17.37508°E
- Country: Hungary
- County: Győr-Moson-Sopron

Area
  - Total: 16.72 km^{2} (6.46 sq mi)

Population (2004)
  - Total: 321
  - Density: 19.19/km^{2} (49.7/sq mi)
- Time zone: UTC+1 (CET)
  - Summer (DST): UTC+2 (CEST)
- Postal code: 9315
- Area code: 96

Sobor is a village in Győr-Moson-Sopron county, Hungary.

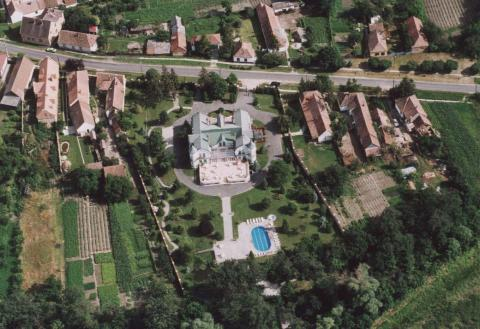
Aerial photography of Sobor
