= Csorna =

- Town
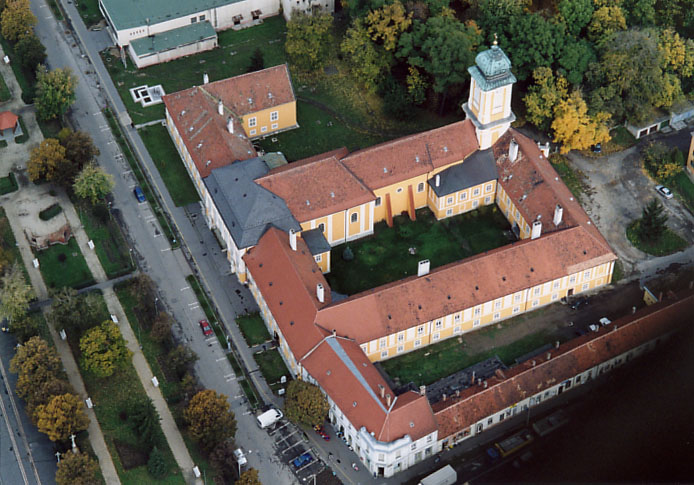
- Aerial view

- Flag Coat of arms

- Location of Csorna
- Coordinates: 47.6167°N 17.2500°E
- Country: Hungary
- County: Győr-Moson-Sopron
- District: Csorna

Area
  - Total: 91.95 km^{2} (35.50 sq mi)

Population (2019)
  - Total: 10,105
  - Density: 109.9/km^{2} (284.6/sq mi)
- Time zone: UTC+1 (CET)
  - Summer (DST): UTC+2 (CEST)
- Postal code: 9300
- Area code: (+36) 96
- Motorways: M85, M86
- Distance from Budapest: 155 km (96 mi) East
- Website: www.csorna.hu

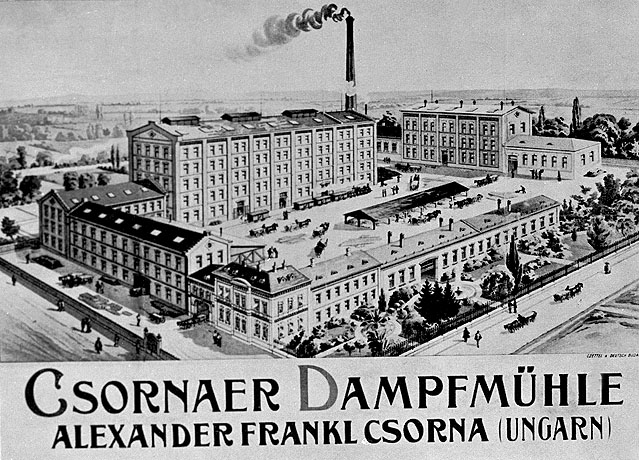

Csorna is a town in Győr-Moson-Sopron county, Hungary. Csorna is located near the Fertő-Hanság National Park. There are two districts in the town: the Földsziget and the Csatárimajor.

== Etymology ==
The name comes from Slavic *Cherna/Chorna (black), see also e.g. Čierna, Černá or Czarna.

== History ==
At 13 June 1849, during the Hungarian War of Independence of 1848 and 1849, in the Battle of Csorna the Hungarian division led by Colonel György Kmety defeated the Austrian troops led by Major General Franz Wyss, who died in the battle. The Hungarian peasants tried to help the Hungarian troops, and because of this the Austrians when they returned to Csorna on 21 June, they burned the city to punish its inhabitants.

== Jews ==
Jews first settled in the town in the second half of the 18th century, at the invitation of the estate owner, count Eszterhazy. The majority were engaged in commerce, while there were some industrialists. The community was organized in 1853. the synagogue was built in 1854 and enlarged in 1884. because of differences between haredim and maskilim (reformer) at the Jewish congress in 1868, the community affiliated with the orthodox stream (which refused to accept the decisions of congress). In 1885 land was obtained for a cemetery and a Khevra Kadisha was established. There were also a school, Talmud Torah and charitable institutions.

In World War I 19 Jews fell in action. During the period of the "White Terror" (1919–21) one Jew was murdered.

In 1930 the community numbered 795 Jews.

=== The Holocaust period ===
In 1941 Jewish males were conscripted for forced labour (work on fortifications and in services together with other Hungarian citizens whom the authorities would not permit to join the armed forces).

In May 1944 a ghetto was set up in Csorna, in which the Jews from the surrounding area were also confined. They were sent on foot and in carts, often for long distances. On 18 June they were all sent to the ghetto in Sopron, and on 5 July they were transported to Auschwitz.

In April 1945 Jewish workers from a forced labour unit at the extermination camp at Balf were brought to the municipal hospital in csorna. They were wounded, having been shot by members of the S.S. and men of Szalasi's "Arrow Cross" fascist party. They all died and were buried in the Jewish cemetery.

After the war, some tens of survivors returned who renewed communal life. In 1955 there were 70 Jews in the area, including 22 children born after the war.

== Sport ==
The association football Csornai SE, competing in the Nemzeti Bajnokság III, are based in the town.

== Notable people ==
- János Áder, President of Hungary
- David Gestetner, inventor of the Gestetner duplicating machine
- László Horváth (modern pentathlete)
- Zoltán Szarka, footballer

== Twin towns – sister cities ==
Csorna is twinned with:

- Dingzhou, China
- Lunca de Sus, Romania
- Miercurea Nirajului, Romania
- Sinzing, Germany
- Zlaté Klasy, Slovakia

== Sources ==
- Hermann, Róbert, ed. (1999). A csornai ütközet története és okmánytára ("The history of the Battle of Csorna and its documents) (in Hungarian). Győr: The Archives of Győr-Moson-Sopron County. p. 310. ISBN 963-8218-20-7.
- Hermann, Róbert (2004). Az 1848–1849-es szabadságharc nagy csatái ("Great battles of the Hungarian Revolution of 1848–1849") (in Hungarian). Budapest: Zrínyi. p. 408. ISBN 963-327-367-6.
