= Rábacsécsény =

- Village
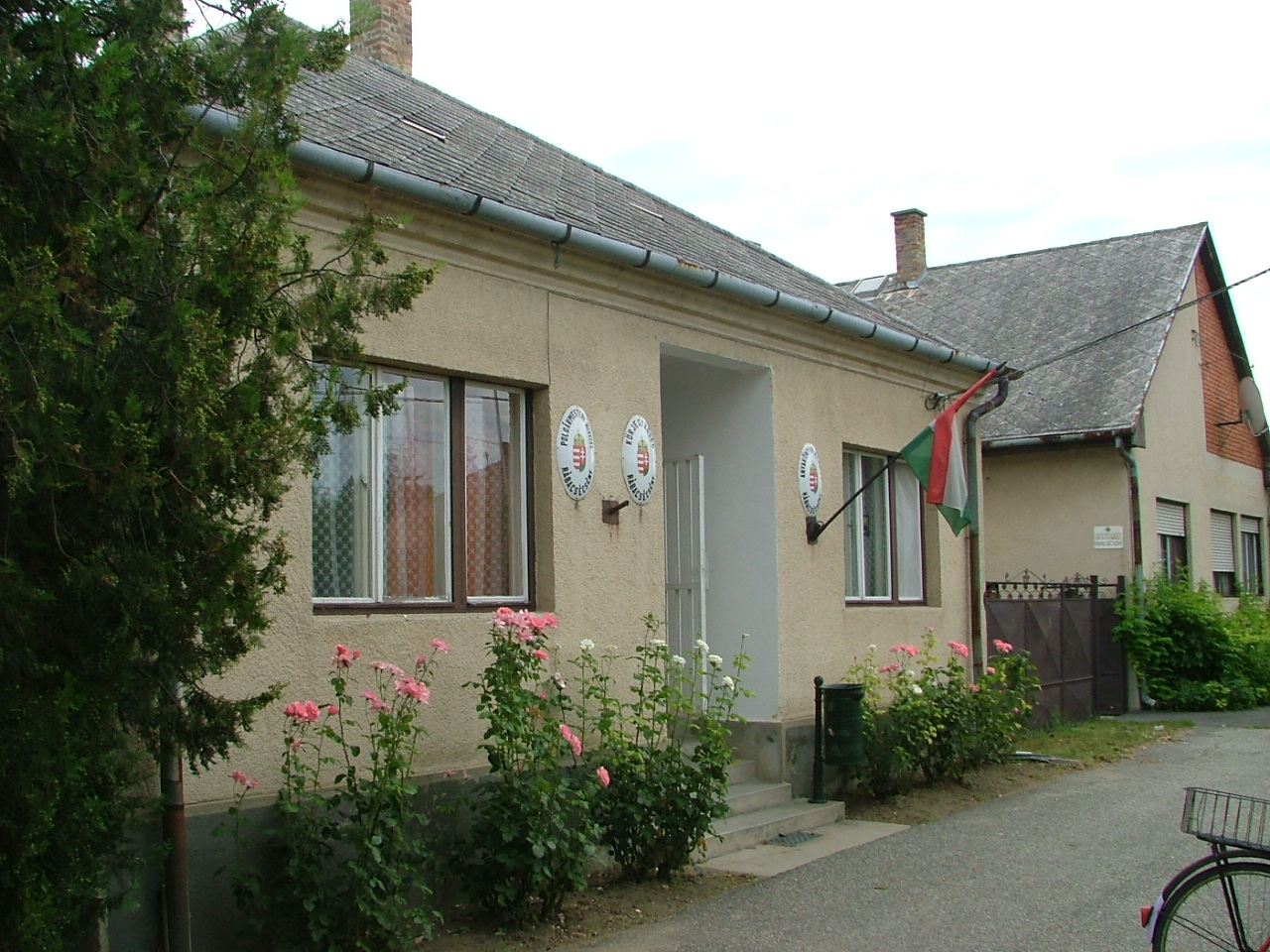
- Village hall

- Flag Coat of arms

- Location of Rábacsécsény
- Coordinates: 47.5833°N 17.4333°E
- Country: Hungary
- County: Győr-Moson-Sopron

Area
  - Total: 15.68 km^{2} (6.05 sq mi)

Population (2025)
  - Total: 626
  - Density: 39.9/km^{2} (103/sq mi)
- Time zone: UTC+1 (CET)
  - Summer (DST): UTC+2 (CEST)
- Postal code: 9136

Rábacsécsény is a village in Győr-Moson-Sopron County, Hungary.
