= Markotabödöge =

- Flag Coat of arms

- Location of Győr-Moson-Sopron county in Hungary

- Location of Markotabödöge
- Coordinates: 47.68144°N 17.31184°E
- Country: Hungary
- County: Győr-Moson-Sopron

Area
  - Total: 16.29 km^{2} (6.29 sq mi)

Population (2004)
  - Total: 491
  - Density: 30.14/km^{2} (78.1/sq mi)
- Time zone: UTC+1 (CET)
  - Summer (DST): UTC+2 (CEST)
- Postal code: 9164
- Area code: 96

Markotabödöge is a village in Győr-Moson-Sopron county, Hungary.
