= Farád =

- Flag Coat of arms

- Location of Győr-Moson-Sopron county in Hungary

- Location of Farád
- Coordinates: 47.60551°N 17.20052°E
- Country: Hungary
- County: Győr-Moson-Sopron

Area
  - Total: 29.02 km^{2} (11.20 sq mi)

Population (2017)
  - Total: 1,927
  - Density: 66.40/km^{2} (172.0/sq mi)
- Time zone: UTC+1 (CET)
  - Summer (DST): UTC+2 (CEST)
- Postal code: 9321
- Area code: 96
- Motorways: M85
- Distance from Budapest: 164 km (102 mi) East

Farád is a village in Győr-Moson-Sopron county, Hungary.
