= Maglóca =

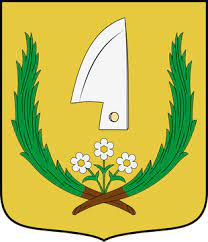
- Coat of arms

- Location of Győr-Moson-Sopron county in Hungary

- Location of Maglóca
- Coordinates: 47.66275°N 17.27460°E
- Country: Hungary
- County: Győr-Moson-Sopron

Area
  - Total: 5.77 km^{2} (2.23 sq mi)

Population (2004)
  - Total: 107
  - Density: 18.54/km^{2} (48.0/sq mi)
- Time zone: UTC+1 (CET)
  - Summer (DST): UTC+2 (CEST)
- Postal code: 9169
- Area code: 96

Maglóca is a village in Győr-Moson-Sopron county, Hungary.
