= Sopronnémeti =

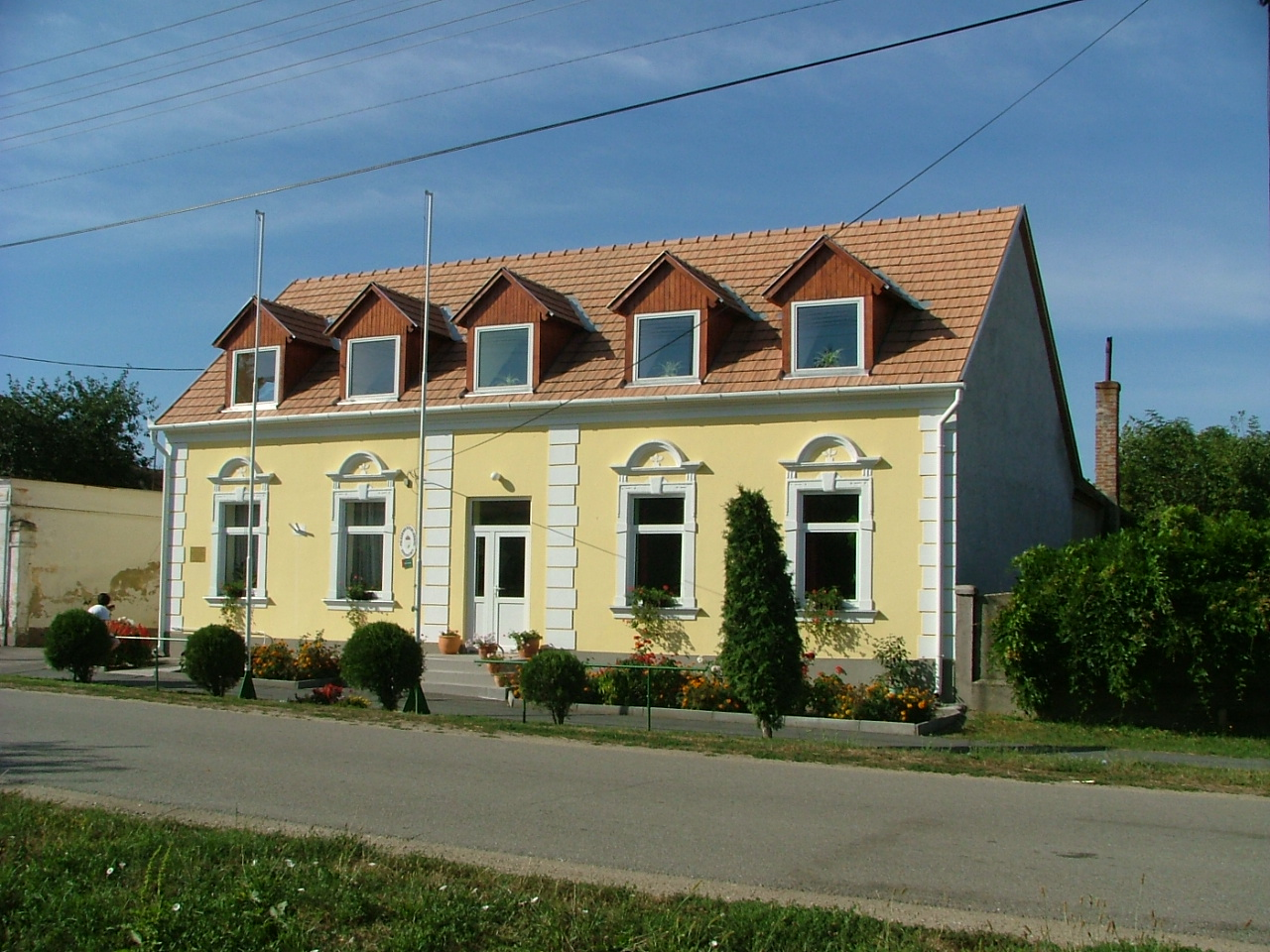
- Town hall

- Flag Coat of arms

- Location of Győr-Moson-Sopron county in Hungary

- Location of Sopronnémeti
- Coordinates: 47.53685°N 17.20561°E
- Country: Hungary
- County: Győr-Moson-Sopron

Area
  - Total: 7.1 km^{2} (2.7 sq mi)

Population (2004)
  - Total: 278
  - Density: 39.15/km^{2} (101.4/sq mi)
- Time zone: UTC+1 (CET)
  - Summer (DST): UTC+2 (CEST)
- Postal code: 9325
- Area code: 96
- Motorways: M86
- Distance from Budapest: 166 km (103 mi) East

Sopronnémeti is a village in Győr-Moson-Sopron county, Hungary.
