= Kapuvár =

- Town
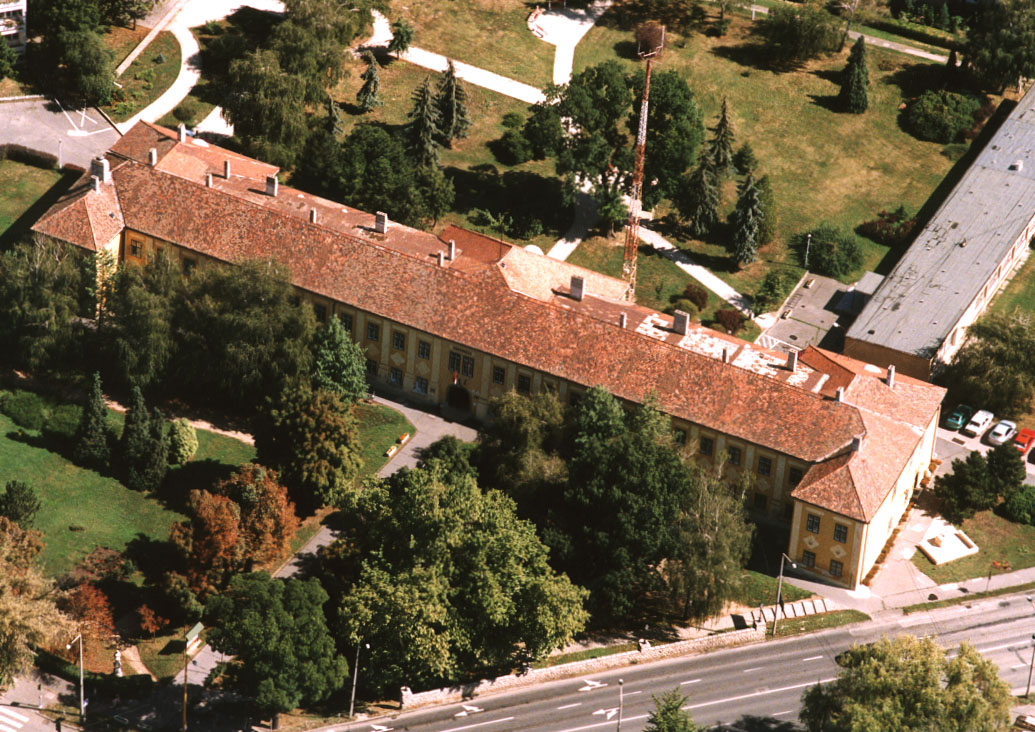
- Kapuvár palace is now the Rábaközi Museum

- Flag Coat of arms

- Location of Kapuvár
- Coordinates: 47.6000°N 17.0333°E
- Country: Hungary
- County: Győr-Moson-Sopron
- District: Kapuvár

Area
  - Total: 96.05 km^{2} (37.09 sq mi)

Population (2009)
  - Total: 10,458
  - Density: 117.71/km^{2} (304.9/sq mi)
- Time zone: UTC+1 (CET)
  - Summer (DST): UTC+2 (CEST)
- Postal code: 9330
- Area code: (+36) 96
- Website: www.kapuvar.hu

Kapuvár (Hungarian pronunciation: [ˈkɒpuvaːr]; German: Kobrunn) is a small but ancient town of some 11,000 inhabitants in Győr-Moson-Sopron county, Hungary. The town is known for its thermal water which some believe has hydrotherapeutic properties. It is served by highway 85, and has a train station. It borders the Fertő-Hanság National Park, 15 kilometres (9 miles) from the border station of Pomogy. The settlement was fortified as early as the 11th century and was the estate owned by the Nádasdy family in the 16th century. St. Ann's church contains an ancient cemetery that is still being used. Local gastronomic specialties include "clasp-knife platter of Kapuvár," rolled meat of Hany Istók, slaughterman liver, foreleg ham of Kapuvár, rolled meat of Hanság, fritter-like pastry, rolled crêpes filled with preserves, and "pretzel of Rábaköz." There is one fine-dining restaurant in the village, and a few small cafes. A pleasant collection of small, pretty houses with colorful flower gardens reflects the tranquillity of the surrounding rural area. The village was left largely untouched by Russian influences.

== Culture ==
The wines of the Sopron wine region are available here, and wine-tastings and wine-tours are popular. A ceramics gallery sells unique Kapuvar creations in porcelain. Horse-riding tourism has significantly developed in recent years.

A three-day cultural programme (Days of Kapuvár) is held on Saint Anne's day on 25–26 July every year, with performances of music, art and folk groups. The Community Centre of Rábaköz holds theatre performances, concerts, folk dance programmes, and sponsors festivals of brass and reed bands, literary evenings, exhibitions and fairs.

A baroque castle, the Eszterháza in Fertőd, is situated 20 kilometres (12 mi) from Kapuvár. Called “the Hungarian Versailles”, it was the site of famous performances and concerts, due to the work of Joseph Haydn. Franz Schubert taught music there, performed concerts, and wrote some of his most famous duets and trios there. A museum in one of the castle's baroque buildings, the House of Music, is open to visitors.

== Twin towns – sister cities ==
Kapuvár is twinned with:

- Biharia, Romania
- Dębica, Poland
- Dębica (rural gmina), Poland
- Mattersburg, Austria
- Svishtov, Bulgaria
