= M85 expressway (Hungary) =

Road in Hungary

M85 expressway
- M85-ös autóút
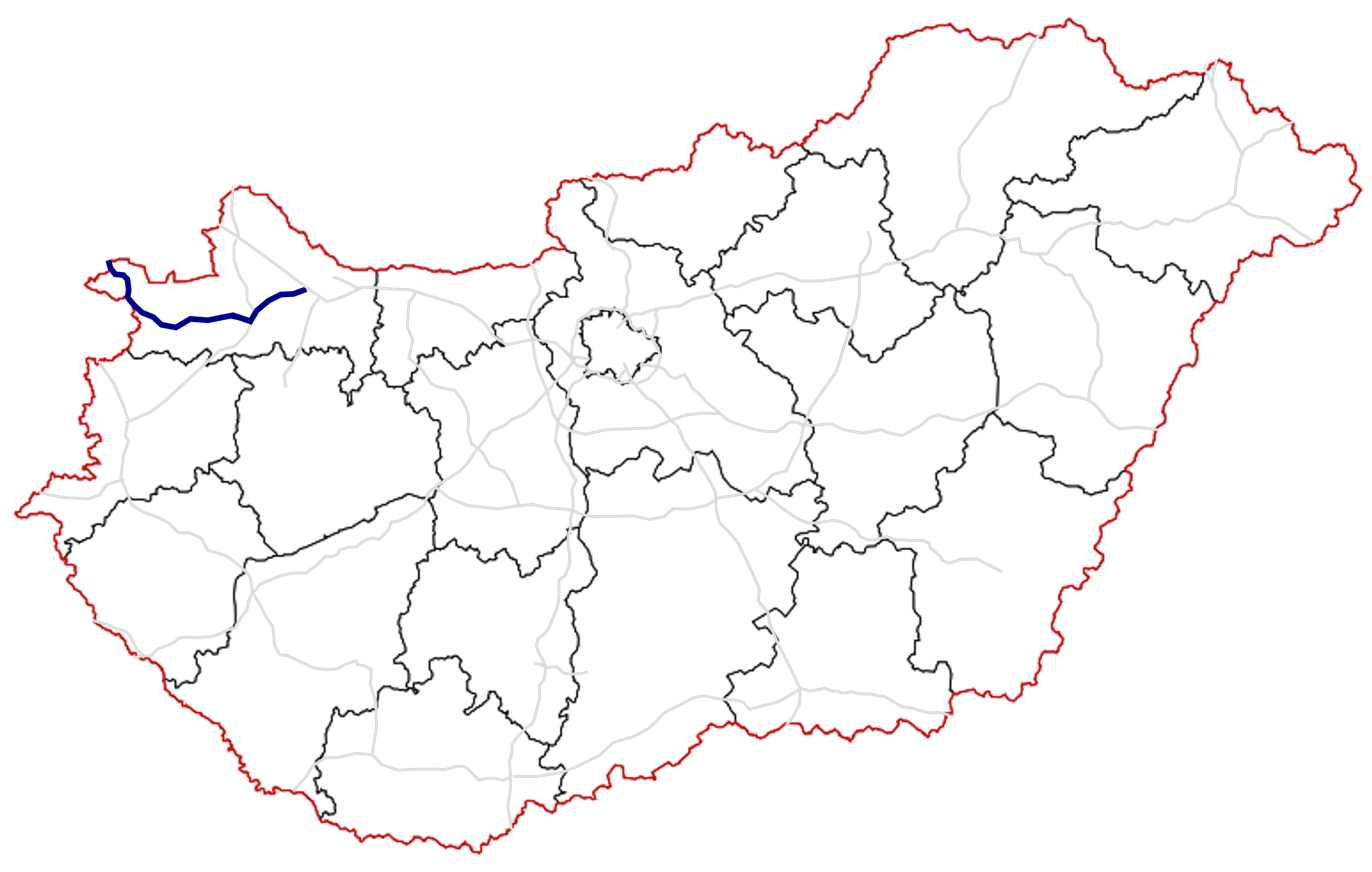
- in use planned other highways

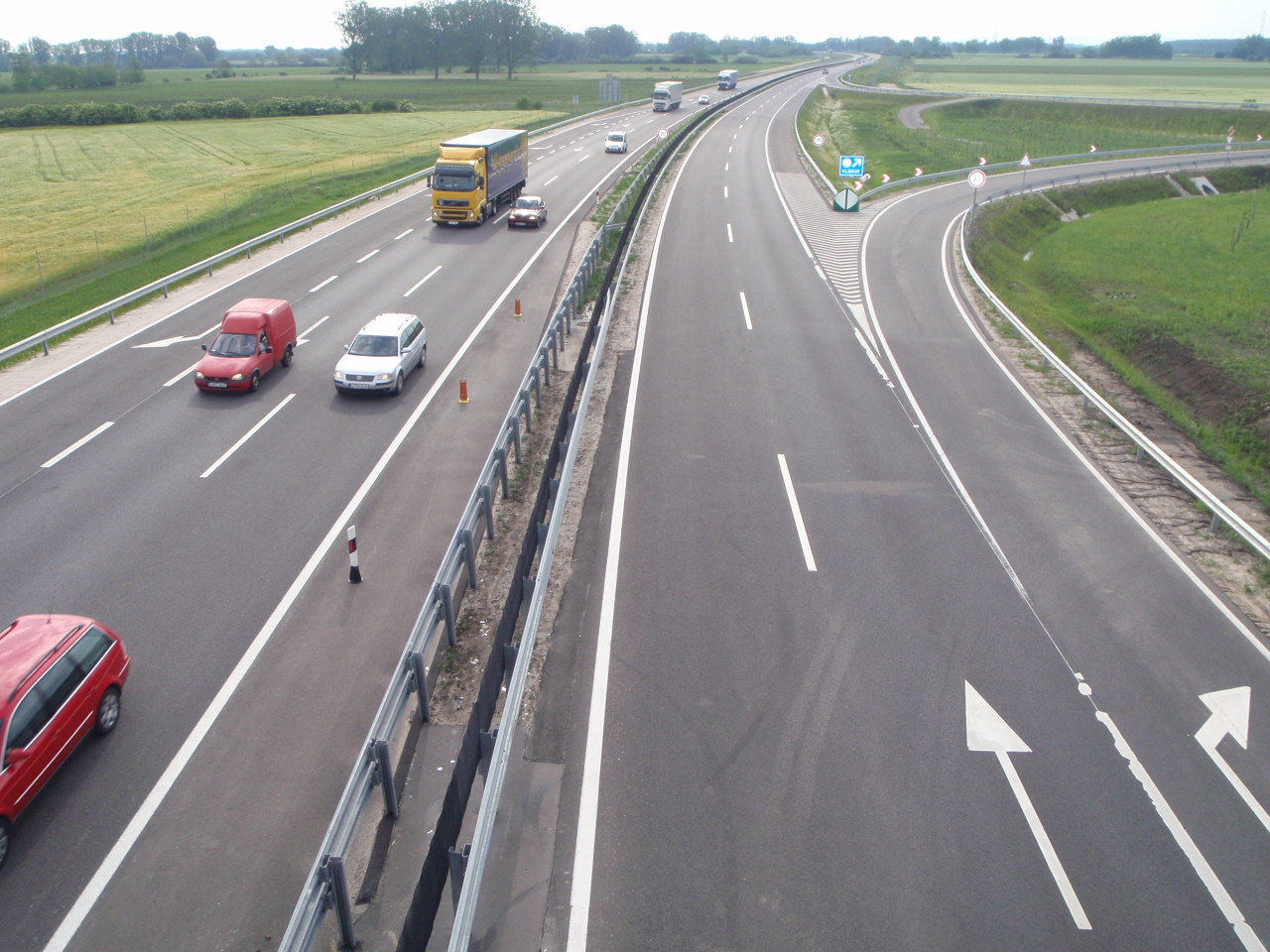
- M85 near Enese

Route information
- Part of E65
- Length: 83 km (52 mi) 95 km (59 mi) planned
- Existed: 2008–present

Major junctions
- From: M1 near Győr
- 85 near Győr, Csorna, Fertőd and Sopron; M86 near Csorna; 84 near Nagycenk and Sopron
- To: Sopron; A 3 border with Austria

Location
- Country: Hungary
- Counties: Győr-Moson-Sopron
- Major cities: Győr, Csorna, Sopron

Highway system
- Roads in Hungary; Highways; Main roads; Local roads

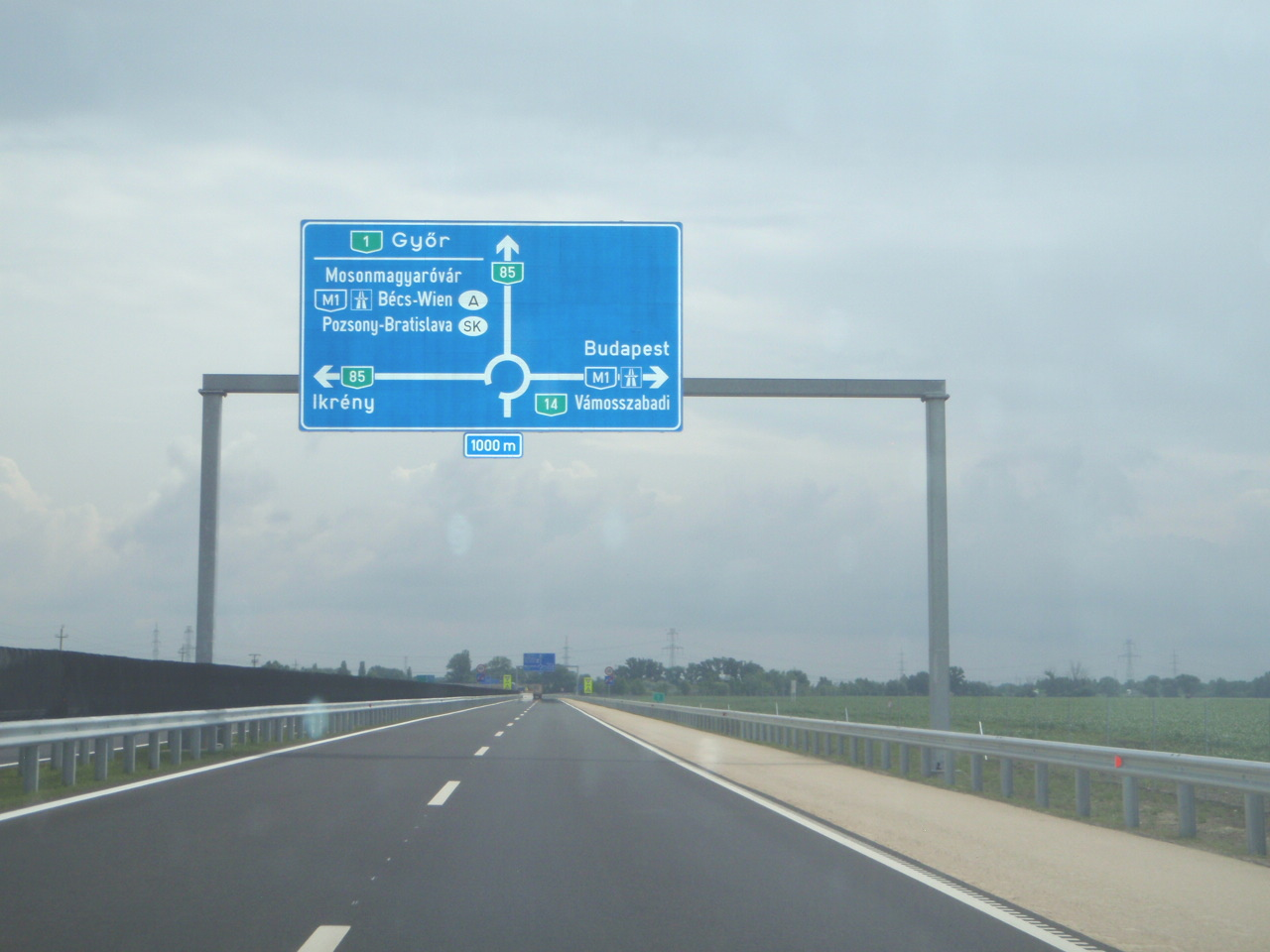
Junction near Győr

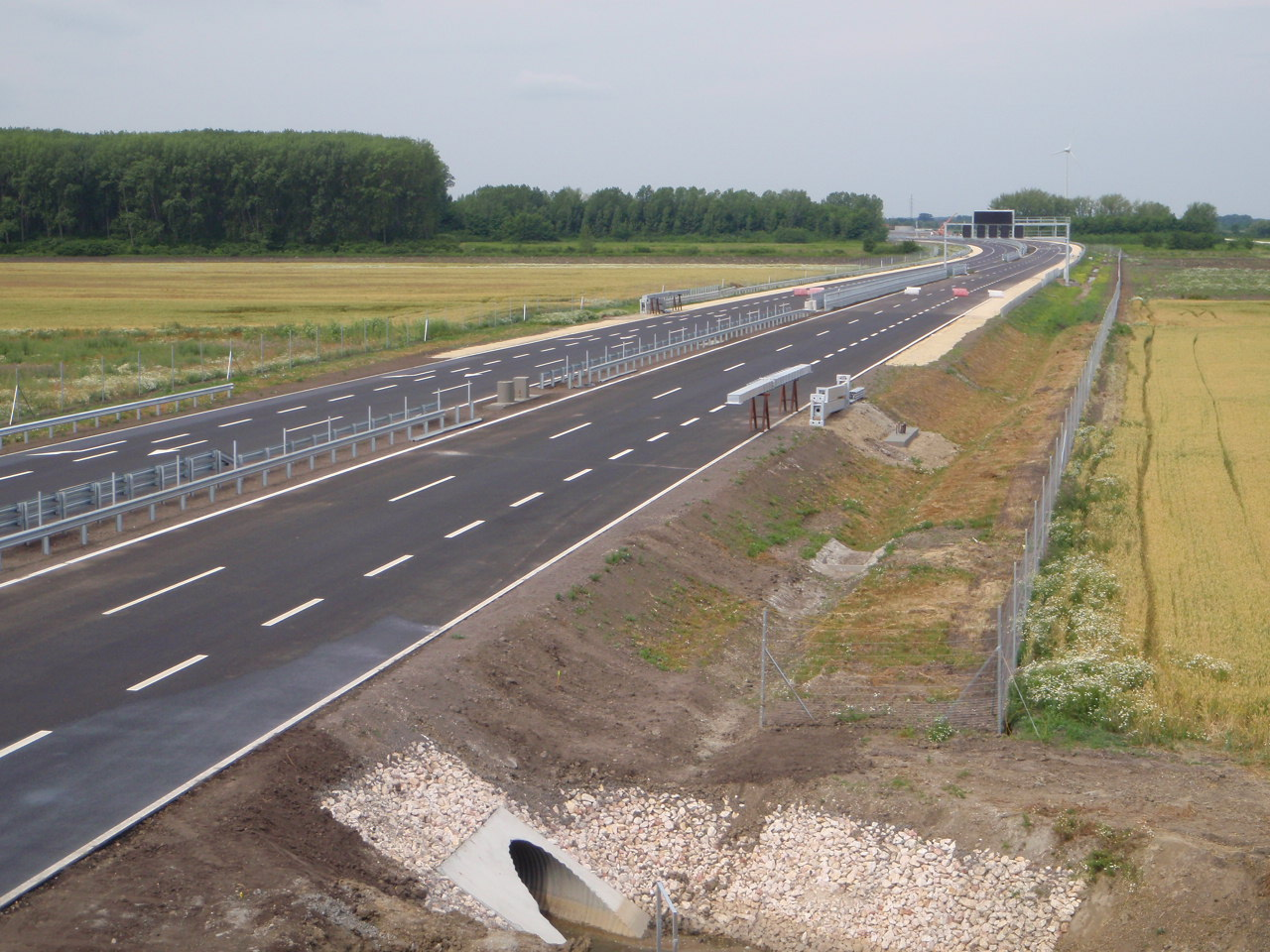
Near Csorna

The M85 expressway (Hungarian: M85-ös autóút) is a Hungarian expressway connecting Győr to Sopron. It will eventually connect M1 motorway to the Austrian border.

== Timeline ==
Section	Length	Opened	Notes
Győr nyugat (M1) – Enese	8.0 km (4.97 mi)	16 June 2015	Built between 2013 – 2015.
Enese bypass	7.0 km (4.35 mi)	21 December 2011	Built between 2009 – 2011.
Enese – Kóny	3.0 km (1.86 mi)	16 June 2015	Built between 2013 – 2015.
Kóny – Csorna	6.0 km (3.73 mi)	9 September 2015	Built between 2013 – 2015.
Csorna bypass I.	5.0 km (3.11 mi)	9 September 2015	Segment I. (East), built between 2013 – 2015. Common route with M86 expressway. This section was extended 2x3 lane.
Csorna bypass II. (M86 junction - Csorny nyugat)	4.5 km (2.80 mi)	15 December 2017	Segment II. (West), built between 2015 – 2017.
Csorna nyugat – Sopron kelet	51.0 km (31.69 mi)	16 December 2020	Built between 2017 – 2020.
Sopron kelet – Balf	2.5 km (1.55 mi)	9 June 2021	Built between 2017 – 2021.
Balf – Sopron észak	6.4 km (3.98 mi)	10 December 2021	Built between 2018 – 2021.
Sopron észak to the border	4.6 km (2.86 mi)	17 December 2024	Under construction, with Sopron Tunnel

== Route description ==
- The route is full length expressway. The maximum speed limit is 110 km/h, with .

County	km	Type	Destination	Notes
Győr-Moson-Sopron	0	Roundabout	Main road 1 – Győr / M1 / E60 / E75 – Mosonmagyaróvár, towards to Vienna (A), Bratislava (SK) / Main road 85 – Ikrény / M1 / E60 / E75 – Budapest and 14 / E575 Vámosszabadi	The eastern terminus of the expressway. Kilometrage starting point Roundabout and interchange junction
Győr-Moson-Sopron	8	Exit	Rábapatona	
Győr-Moson-Sopron	10	Exit	Lébény, Bezi / Enese, Tét	
Győr-Moson-Sopron	16	Exit	Kóny / Rábcakapi	Connecting to petrol station and Truck parking.
Győr-Moson-Sopron	21	Exit	Main road 85 – Csorna	
Győr-Moson-Sopron	23	Interchange	85 / E65 – Mosonmagyaróvár M85 – Sopron / M86 / E65 Szombathely, towards to Marbor (SLO)	The northern terminus of the common road with M85-M86 expressways, and E65 route. The eastern part of Csorna bypass. The northern terminus of 2x3 lane road.
Győr-Moson-Sopron		Bridge	over the Győr–Sopron railway line	
Győr-Moson-Sopron	25	Bridge	over the Pápa–Csorna railway line	
Győr-Moson-Sopron	27	Interchange	M85 – Sopron, Kapuvár M86 / E65 Szombathely, towards to Marbor (SLO)	The southern terminus of the common road with M85-M86 expressways, and E65 route. The southern part of Csorna bypass. The southern terminus of 2x3 lane road.
Győr-Moson-Sopron		Bridge	over the Hegyeshalom–Szombathely railway line	
Győr-Moson-Sopron	32	Exit	Jobaháza, Farád / Csorna nyugat	nyugat means West
Győr-Moson-Sopron	40	Rest area	Babóti pihenőhely	parking, WC, and water (petrol station in the future) pihenőhely means Rest area
Győr-Moson-Sopron	44	Exit	Beled, Hövej / Kapuvár	
Győr-Moson-Sopron	53	Exit	Fertőd, Fertőendréd	Connecting to Main road 85.
Győr-Moson-Sopron	55	Rest area	Széchenyi pihenőhely	parking, WC, and water
Győr-Moson-Sopron	60	Exit	Kőszeg, Lövő / Fertőszentmiklós	
Győr-Moson-Sopron	68	Bridge	under the Győr–Sopron railway line	
Győr-Moson-Sopron	72	Exit	Main road 84 – Nagycenk / Sárvár	Connection to Sopron, and the Lake Balaton.
Győr-Moson-Sopron	78	Rest area	Hutbájd pihenőhely	parking, WC, and water Tengelysúlymérő állomás means weigh in motion (traffic control)
Győr-Moson-Sopron	79	Bridge	over the Győr–Sopron railway line	
Győr-Moson-Sopron		Bridge	Ikva híd	híd means Bridge
Győr-Moson-Sopron	82	Exit	Main road 84 – Kópháza (border) / Sopron Centrum Harka	
Győr-Moson-Sopron	85	Exit	Sopron-Balf / Sopron-Pihenőkereszt	
Győr-Moson-Sopron	89	Exit	Sopron észak / Fertőrákos	észak means North
Győr-Moson-Sopron	90	Tunnel	Soproni alagút	Length: 780 m alagút means Tunnel
Győr-Moson-Sopron	93	Exit	Main road 84 – Sopron nyugat / Ágfalva	nyugat means West Western under construction section
Győr-Moson-Sopron	94	Rest area	Scarbantia pihenőhely	Planned
Győr-Moson-Sopron	95	Border crossing within the EU	Soporn (H) – Klingenbach (AT) border crossing A 3 – Eisenstadt towards to Vienna	Planned
1.000 mi = 1.609 km; 1.000 km = 0.621 mi: Concurrency terminus; Incomplete access; Unopened

== Maintenance ==
The operation and maintenance of the road by Hungarian Concession Infrastructure Development Plc.. This activity is provided by these highway engineers.

- in Csorna, mixed - use engineering
- near Nagycenk, kilometre trench 71 (under construction)

== Payment ==
Hungarian system has 2 main type in terms of salary:

1, time-based fee vignettes (E-matrica);

- Cars, vans and motorbikes up to 3.5 tonnes only need to buy a single vignette which costs 6,400 Hungarian forint (Ft) for 10 days, 10,360 Ft for 1 month and 57,260 Ft for a year, from 1 January 2024.

2, county vignettes (Megyei matrica); the highway can be used instead of the national sticker with the following county stickers:

Type of county vignette	Available section
Győr-Moson-Soporn	full length (0 km – 83 km)

== See also ==
- Roads in Hungary
- Transport in Hungary
- International E-road network
