= Jobaháza =

- Flag Coat of arms

- Location of Győr-Moson-Sopron county in Hungary

- Location of Jobaháza
- Coordinates: 47.58000°N 17.1884°E
- Country: Hungary
- County: Győr-Moson-Sopron

Area
  - Total: 8.06 km^{2} (3.11 sq mi)

Population (2004)
  - Total: 558
  - Density: 69.23/km^{2} (179.3/sq mi)
- Time zone: UTC+1 (CET)
  - Summer (DST): UTC+2 (CEST)
- Postal code: 9323
- Area code: 96
- Motorways: M85
- Distance from Budapest: 164 km (102 mi) East

Jobaháza is a village in Győr-Moson-Sopron county, Hungary.
