= Acsalag =

- Flag Coat of arms

- Location of Győr-Moson-Sopron county in Hungary

- Location of Acsalag
- Coordinates: 47.67781°N 17.19760°E
- Country: Hungary
- County: Győr-Moson-Sopron

Area
  - Total: 10.45 km^{2} (4.03 sq mi)

Population (2004)
  - Total: 469
  - Density: 44.88/km^{2} (116.2/sq mi)
- Time zone: UTC+1 (CET)
  - Summer (DST): UTC+2 (CEST)
- Postal code: 9168
- Area code: 96

Acsalag is a municipality in Győr-Moson-Sopron county, Hungary. Its name comes from the word "to lure", because the swampy nature of the landscape made it necessary to entice people to live there.

Nyirka Hany, a protected area of Fertő-Hanság National Park, lies north-northwest of Acsalag.
