= Pásztori =

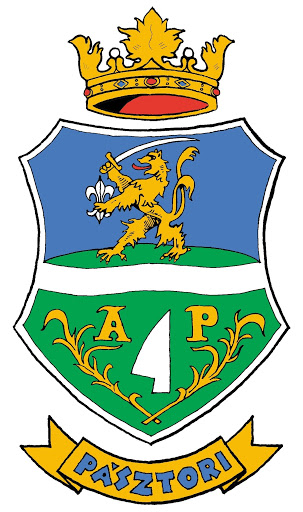
- Coat of arms

- Location of Pásztori
- Coordinates: 47.55609°N 17.27105°E
- Country: Hungary
- County: Győr-Moson-Sopron

Area
  - Total: 8.52 km^{2} (3.29 sq mi)

Population (2004)
  - Total: 399
  - Density: 46.83/km^{2} (121.3/sq mi)
- Time zone: UTC+1
  - Summer (DST): UTC+2 (CEST)
- Postal code: 9311
- Area code: 96

Pásztori is a settlement in Győr-Moson-Sopron County, Hungary.
