= Kóny =

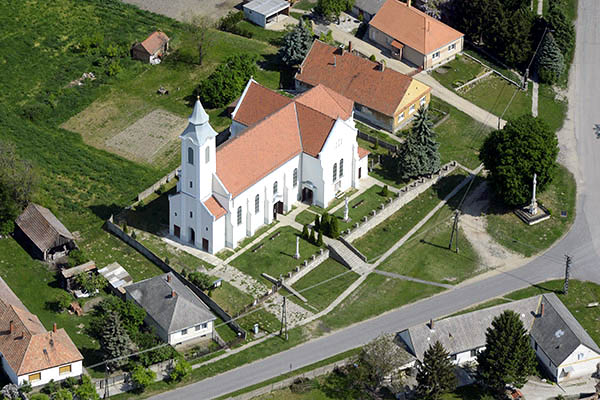
- Aerial view of the church

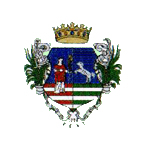
- Coat of arms

- Location of Kóny Kóny (Hungary)
- Coordinates: 47.62977°N 17.36279°E
- Country: Hungary
- County: Győr-Moson-Sopron

Area
  - Total: 28.87 km^{2} (11.15 sq mi)

Population (2004)
  - Total: 2,692
  - Density: 93.24/km^{2} (241.5/sq mi)
- Time zone: UTC+1 (CET)
  - Summer (DST): UTC+2 (CEST)
- Postal code: 9144
- Area code: 96
- Motorways: M85
- Distance from Budapest: 147 km (91 mi) East
- Website: http://www.kony.hu/

Kóny is a village in Győr-Moson-Sopron county, Hungary. It is around 20 km west of Győr.
