= Rábakecöl =

- Flag Coat of arms

- Location of Rábakecöl
- Coordinates: 47.4333°N 17.1167°E
- Country: Hungary
- County: Győr-Moson-Sopron

Government
  - Mayor: Tuba Erik (Ind.)

Area
  - Total: 23.03 km^{2} (8.89 sq mi)

Population (2022)
  - Total: 645
  - Density: 28.0/km^{2} (72.5/sq mi)
- Time zone: UTC+1 (CET)
  - Summer (DST): UTC+2 (CEST)
- Postal code: 9344
- Area code: 96
- Motorways: M86
- Distance from Budapest: 178 km (111 mi) East

Rábakecöl is a village in Győr-Moson-Sopron County, Hungary.
