= Cirák =

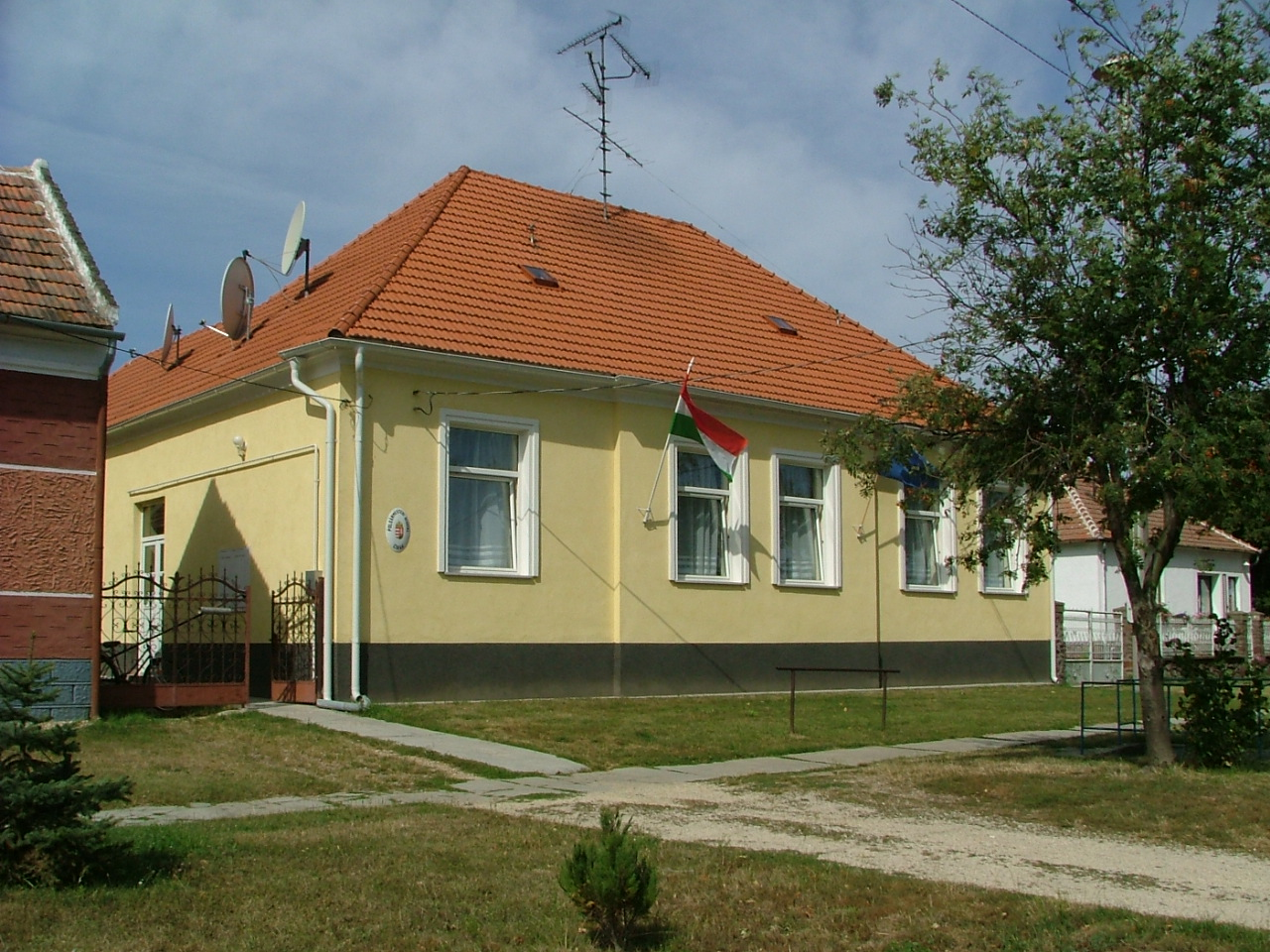
- Town hall

- Flag Coat of arms

- Location of Győr-Moson-Sopron county in Hungary

- Location of Cirák
- Coordinates: 47.47682°N 17.02719°E
- Country: Hungary
- County: Győr-Moson-Sopron

Area
  - Total: 11.78 km^{2} (4.55 sq mi)

Population (2004)
  - Total: 647
  - Density: 54.92/km^{2} (142.2/sq mi)
- Time zone: UTC+1 (CET)
  - Summer (DST): UTC+2 (CEST)
- Postal code: 9364
- Area code: 96

Cirák is a village in Győr-Moson-Sopron county, Hungary.
