= Rábcakapi =

- Flag Coat of arms

- Location of Rábcakapi
- Coordinates: 47.7000°N 17.2833°E
- Country: Hungary
- County: Győr-Moson-Sopron

Government
  - Mayor: Szabó Ágnes (Ind.)

Area
  - Total: 7.85 km^{2} (3.03 sq mi)

Population (2022)
  - Total: 186
  - Density: 23.7/km^{2} (61.4/sq mi)
- Time zone: UTC+1 (CET)
  - Summer (DST): UTC+2 (CEST)
- Postal code: 9165
- Area code: 96

Rábcakapi is a village in Győr-Moson-Sopron County, Hungary.
