= Rábatamási =

- Flag Coat of arms

- Location of Rábatmaási
- Coordinates: 47.583300°N 17.166700°E
- Country: Hungary
- County: Győr–Moson–Sopron

Government
  - Mayor: Kovács Attila (Ind.)

Area
  - Total: 21.77 km^{2} (8.41 sq mi)

Population (2022)
  - Total: 974
  - Density: 44.7/km^{2} (116/sq mi)
- Time zone: UTC+1 (CET)
  - Summer (DST): UTC+2 (CEST)
- Postal code: 9322
- Area code: 96
- Motorways: M85
- Distance from Budapest: 166 km (103 mi) East

Rábatamási is a village in Győr–Moson–Sopron County, Hungary.
