= Rábasebes =

- Village
- Flag Coat of arms

- Location of Rábasebes
- Coordinates: 47.4333°N 17.2333°E
- Country: Hungary
- County: Győr-Moson-Sopron

Area
  - Total: 5.39 km^{2} (2.08 sq mi)

Population (2001)
  - Total: 117
  - Density: 21.7/km^{2} (56/sq mi)
- Time zone: UTC+1 (CET)
  - Summer (DST): UTC+2 (CEST)
- Postal code: 9327

Rábasebes is a village in Győr-Moson-Sopron County, Hungary along the river Rába.

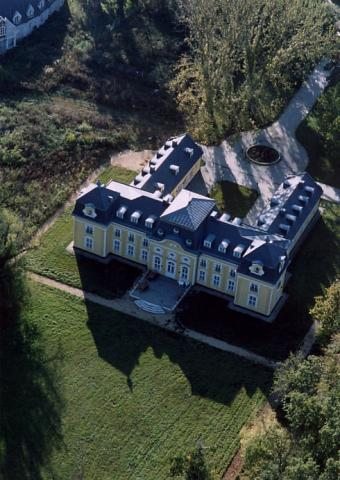
Castle Széchenyi.

The Castle Széchenyi was built at the turn of the 20th century by the Széchenyi family.
