= Rábapordány =

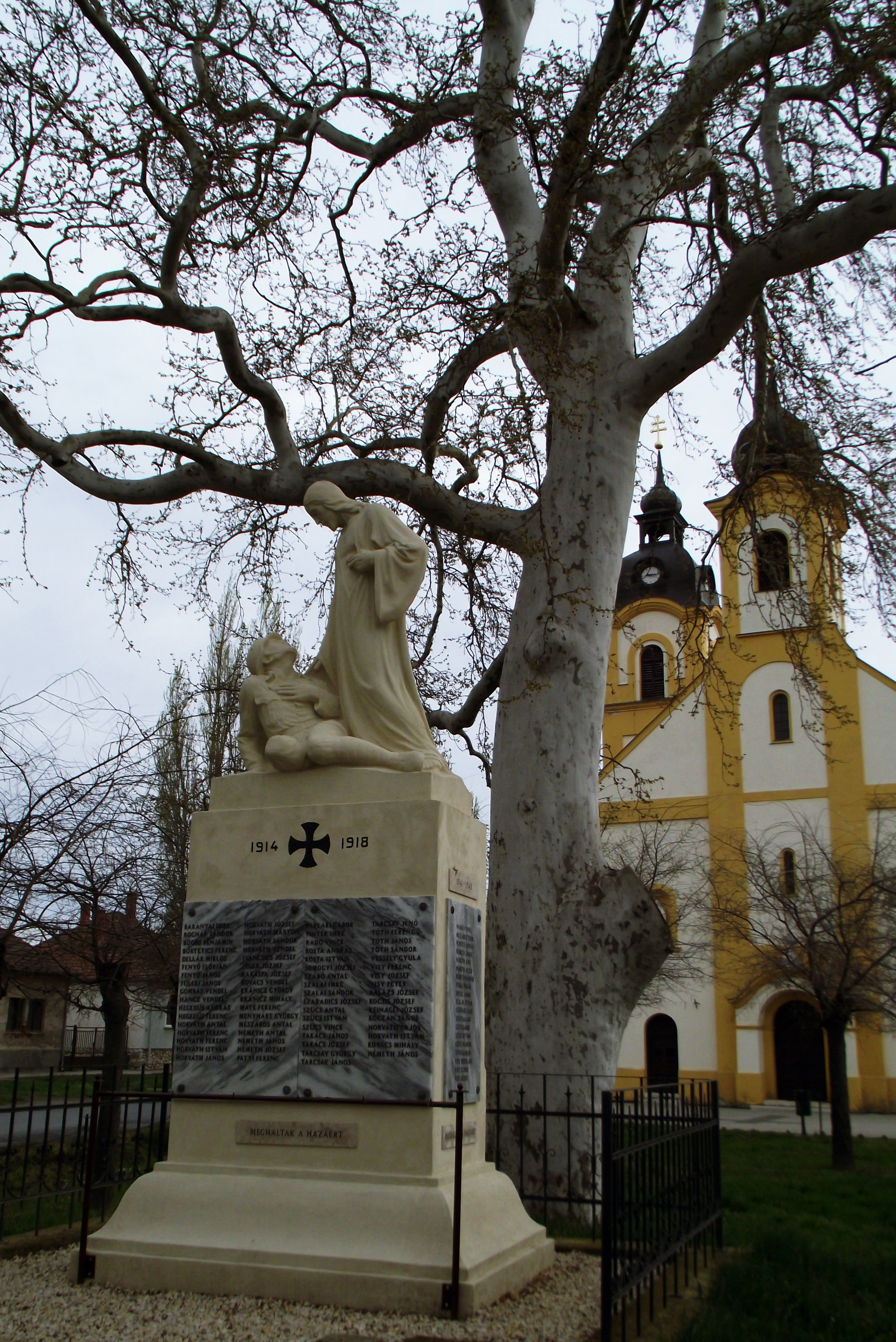
- A monument in Rábapordány along with a church.

- Flag Coat of arms

- Location of Rábapordány
- Coordinates: 47.5667°N 17.3333°E
- Country: Hungary
- County: Győr-Moson-Sopron

Government
  - Mayor: Visy László (Ind.)

Area
  - Total: 21.90 km^{2} (8.46 sq mi)

Population (2022)
  - Total: 935
  - Density: 42.7/km^{2} (111/sq mi)
- Time zone: UTC+1 (CET)
  - Summer (DST): UTC+2 (CEST)
- Postal code: 9146
- Area code: 96

Rábapordány is a village in Győr-Moson-Sopron County, Hungary.
