= Szil =

- Flag Coat of arms

- Location of Győr-Moson-Sopron county in Hungary

- Location of Szil
- Coordinates: 47.50138°N 17.23305°E
- Country: Hungary
- County: Győr-Moson-Sopron

Area
  - Total: 31.03 km^{2} (11.98 sq mi)

Population (2004)
  - Total: 1,334
  - Density: 42.99/km^{2} (111.3/sq mi)
- Time zone: UTC+1 (CET)
  - Summer (DST): UTC+2 (CEST)
- Postal code: 9326
- Area code: 96
- Motorways: M86
- Distance from Budapest: 168 km (104 mi) East

Szil is a village in Győr-Moson-Sopron county, Hungary.
