= Rábaszentandrás =

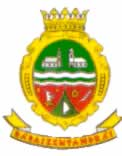
- Coat of arms

- Location of Győr-Moson-Sopron county in Hungary

- Location of Rábaszentandrás
- Coordinates: 47.4500°N 17.3333°E
- Country: Hungary
- County: Győr-Moson-Sopron

Area
  - Total: 11.61 km^{2} (4.48 sq mi)

Population (2025)
  - Total: 455
- Time zone: UTC+1 (CET)
  - Summer (DST): UTC+2 (CEST)
- Postal code: 9316
- Area code: 96

Rábaszentandrás is a village in Győr-Moson-Sopron county, Hungary.
