= Rábacsanak =

- Flag Coat of arms

- Location of Győr-Moson-Sopron county in Hungary

- Location of Rábacsanak
- Coordinates: 47.52586°N 17.29046°E
- Country: Hungary
- County: Győr-Moson-Sopron

Area
  - Total: 13.85 km^{2} (5.35 sq mi)

Population (2004)
  - Total: 581
  - Density: 41.94/km^{2} (108.6/sq mi)
- Time zone: UTC+1 (CET)
  - Summer (DST): UTC+2 (CEST)
- Postal code: 9313
- Area code: 96

Rábacsanak is a village in Győr-Moson-Sopron county, Hungary.
