= Répceszemere =

- Flag Coat of arms

- Location of Győr-Moson-Sopron county in Hungary

- Location of Répceszemere
- Coordinates: 47.42796°N 16.97273°E
- Country: Hungary
- County: Győr–Moson–Sopron

Area
  - Total: 9.42 km^{2} (3.64 sq mi)

Population (2004)
  - Total: 336
  - Density: 35.66/km^{2} (92.4/sq mi)
- Time zone: UTC+1 (CET)
  - Summer (DST): UTC+2 (CEST)
- Postal code: 9375
- Area code: 99

Répceszemere is a village in Győr–Moson–Sopron county, Hungary.

Like many villages and towns in Europe, the population of Raftsemara is also significantly smaller. Thus, from 347 residents in 1990 to 291 residents in 2021 (a decrease of 16%).

In the 19th century a small Jewish community lived in the village, many of whose members were murdered in the Holocaust.
