= Battle of Ihász =

Battle of the Hungarian War of Independence of 1848–1849

Coordinates: 47°23′53.4″N 17°25′34.5″E

- Part of the Hungarian Revolution of 1848
Date	27 June 1849
Location	around and in Ihász, a formerly existing village, today part of Marcaltő, Kingdom of Hungary
Result	Austrian victory

Belligerents
Hungarian Revolutionary Army	Austrian Empire

Commanders and leaders
György Kmety	Adolf Schütte Edler von Warensberg; Joseph Gerstner Edler von Gerstenkorn

Strength
5,092 men, 15 cannons, 2 Congreve rocket launching racks	~4,902 men, 6 cannons

Casualties and losses
Total: 200 dead, wounded and missing.	Total: 277; 65 death, 162 wounded, 50 missing.

The Battle of Ihász took place during the Summer Campaign of the Hungarian War of Independence. It was fought on 27 June 1849 around and in Ihász, a formerly existing village, today part of Marcaltő. In this battle, the Hungarian division led by General György Kmety fought against the Austrian Gerstner brigade led by Lieutenant General Adolf Schütte Edler von Warensberg. During the preparations for the Battle of Győr, the Gerstner brigade wanted to cut the Hungarians from the south, by attacking Marcaltő, but the Kmety division attacked them and halted their advance for 2 hours with its artillery, but the attack of the Austrian cavalry forced the Hungarians to retreat towards Pápa. A result of this battle was that the Kmety division was forced to retreat in Southern Hungary, so it could not support the Hungarian main (Army of the Upper Danube) army led by General Artúr Görgei in the very important battles for Győr and Komárom.

== Background ==
With the start of the Summer Campaign, in which the army of the Russian empire entered to help the Habsburg empire, the situation of Hungarian independence, won with heavy battles and tremendous bloodshed, started to look more and more hopeless. Nevertheless, the start of this campaign was won by the Hungarians when Colonel György Kmety defeated the Austrian brigade led by Major General Franz Wyss in the Battle of Csorna on 13 June 1849, in which the imperial commander died. But in the region of Western Hungary, along the shores of the Danube the Austrian main army led by Field Marshal Julius Jacob von Haynau, reinforced by a Russian division, with 82,570 soldiers, was ready to start their decisive advance towards the hearth of Hungary.

The division of Kmety had the duty to secure the left flank of the VII. corps led by General Ernő Poeltenberg. As seen above, Kmety started his duty well, when he defeated the Austrian troops from Csorna. Kmety's attack could have had very positive results for the planned general Hungarian attack, making Haynau send troops to the right banks of the Danube, thus easing the job of the Hungarian main armies, who wanted to attack in the region of the Vág river, which was on the left bank. Haynau indeed started to group his troops on the right bank, but not for defensive reasons, but because he wanted to attack. So, Kmety's action resulted in a great Hungarian tactical success but did not have more important results. Haynau penalized the imperial officers from Wyss's half brigade, whom he found to be guilty of the defeat, continuing at the same time to prepare for his attack.

After the Battle of Csorna Kmety retreated to Tét. On 16 June he sent 6 companies of the 10. (Wilhelm) Hussar regiment, with a half cavalry battery to Pápa, and the 45. and the 2. Honvéd battalions to Marcaltő, keeping the 10., 23., and 33. Honvéd battalions, 2 jäger companies at, 2 companies of the 12. (Nádor) Hussar regiment, the other half of the cavalry battery, and an infantry battery at Tét. He detached infantry companies for each crossing of the Rába river (Marcaltő, Malomsok, Mórichida, Kisbabot, and Rábaszentmihály), sending patrols along the rivers line until Kiscell.

Starting with June the conflicts among the Hungarian commanders started to appear, which raised doubts about the possibility of organizing a successful defense against the upcoming Austrian. An example of this was the argument between General György Klapka (the deputy minister of war) and Colonel József Bayer (the chief of staff of the Army of the Upper Danube, leader of the Central Operational Bureau, which had to coordinate the Hungarian troops in Western Hungary) about who has more right to command over the Hungarian units? When, on 14 June, Klapka ordered Kmety to send most of his cavalry to Pápa, one of his brigades to Marcaltő, and with the other one to remain at Tét, Bayer protested at Görgei, saying that Klapka puts in danger the Hungarian army, the high commander agreed with Bayer, ordering to Kmety, who already fulfilled Klapka's order, to remain with all his forces along the Rába, keeping an eye, especially on the valley of the Gyöngyös river; dismantle all the bridges across the river, but to keep the material at hands, to be able to rebuild them in a couple of hours, if needed; keep his headquarters at Tét, while sending detachments at Pápa, Marcaltő, and Mórichida. And allowed him to conduct attacks against enemy units, smaller or equal to his troops, without asking permission from his superiors. Ménfő (today is a part of Győr) because here he will prevent the k.u.k. troops to cut him from the VII. corps. But in the case of an Austrian success in this matter, he will be forced to retreat from Győr, to avoid the encirclement. On 27 June Kmety received an order from the Central Operational Bureau to hold the line of the Rába as long as he can, then to retreat towards Pápa. They wrote Klapka to send him reinforcements.

On 26 June, the imperial troops attacked. According to Haynau's plan, this offensive had to fulfill several goals: to encircle the VII. corps of Poeltenberg, to occupy Győr, and to cut off the link of the VII. corps with the Kmety division.

== Prelude ==
The Gerstner brigade, after crossing the Danube with the III. corps, which part it was, on 22-23 June marched to Kövesd, on 24 to Csapod, on 25 to Mihályi, and to 26 at Szany. This brigade represented the edge of the right wing of the III. corps. (Note: For the position of the other brigades of the III. corps and the other corps of the k.u.k. army, check the article about the Battle of Győr) On 25 and 26 June Lieutenant General Karl Freiherr von Moltke ordered the Gerstner brigade to cross the Rába at Várkesző, then to attack Kmety's division at Marcaltő. The Gerstner brigade had the hardest mission among the k.u.k. units because it had the duty to cover the back of the attacking imperial units against the Kmety division, estimated (wrongly) by the Austrian intelligence to 8000 soldiers. While the Austrian corps had to make a concentric attack against Győr, the Gerstner brigade had to do an eccentric attack. If Kmety could repulse the attack of the Gerstner brigade, it would slow the advance of the III. corps, enabling Poeltenberg to defend Győr with a greater chance of success, and win time for the Hungarians.

On 26 June Kmety reported to the Central Operational Bureau that the Austrians advance in three columns against his positions: one column from Kapuvár, through Csorna to Marcaltő, the second from Nagycenk through Mihályi and Szany in the same direction, while the third towards Pápoc. He felt his troops inferior to the attacking k.u.k. units, so he asked for 2 infantry battalions and a cavalry battery reinforcements from Poeltenberg, to defend the crossings over the Rába from Mórichida, Kisbabot, and Rábaszentmihály, so he can free the units which guarded these crossings, and concentrate them at his headquarter from Marcaltő. Kmety hoped that the reinforcements promised by Poeltenberg would arrive, so he could counterattack. Poeltenberg received Kmety's request for reinforcements on 26 June. He sent, under the lead of Lieutenant Colonel Hümér Kupa, the 51. battalion, 2 battalions of the 2. (Sándor) infantry regiment, and 4 companies of the 16th (Károlyi) Hussar regiment, as well as a cavalry battery to Tét. This detachment arrived on 27 June at 6:30 a.m. in Tét, then moved to Ménfő, following Poeltenberg's order.

On 26 June, Kmety's spread his division on the Szentpéter-Marcaltő-Rábaszentmihály line, with units deployed in 8 villages. In the same evening he was informed that the k.u.k. troops crossed the Rába at Árpás and Mórichida crossed the Rába, and forced to retreat the company of the 33. Honvéd battalion, which was guarding the crossing points, led by Captain Zsigmond Horváth; 23 Honvéd battalion and the 4,000 cartridges sent to them in support by Kmety arrived too late.

In the morning of that day the Gerstner brigade, departing from Mihályi, started their attempts to cross the river at Várkesző, under the supervision of Lieutenant General Schütte, under the fire of the Hungarian units from the right banks of the Rába.

Kmety planned to gather his troops at Marcaltő, then on the next day to cross at Pápoc the Rába, and attack the enemy from behind and from the side. For this, he needed the help of the battalion sent earlier to Mórichida, but when the soldiers arrived on 27 June in the morning, he saw them too tired to undertake this long march. He also explained later that he feared that his retreat routs could be easily cut off.

On the morning of 27 June, Lieutenant-Colonel Emil Üchtritz, hearing about the imperial movements, rushed with his half artillery battery to the banks of the Rába just as the Austrians started to make a pontoon bridge over the river. Kmety then arrived to take command. When the Austrian Kaiserjägers started to shoot back, Kmety ordered a retreat to Marcaltő, then to the Ihász farm. Üchtritz later declared that he did not understand why Kmety retreated without trying to defend the Rába line.

Kmety wrote that Marcaltő was undefendable against superior enemy forces because there he could have been attacked from two sides by the enemy and that around the Ihász farm he could defend himself with more success, but only if he receives the reinforcements which he asked from Poeltenberg.

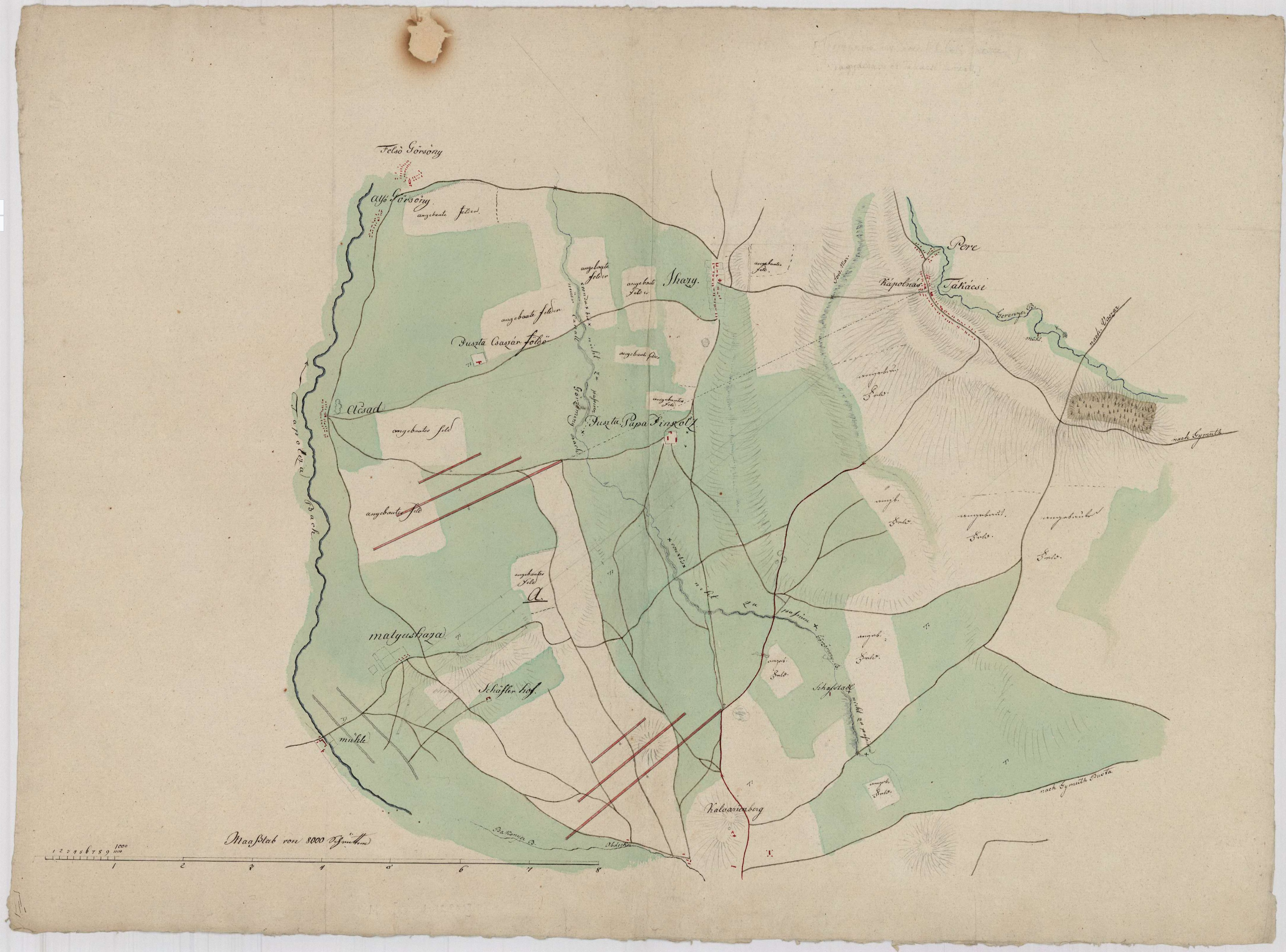
Map of the battleground of the Battle of Ihász (1849)

Schütte did not understand why Kmety retreated from the defendable Rába line, and he thought for a while that the Hungarians try to set a trap. Even after crossing all his troops at 8:30 a.m., he sent 2 companies of cavalry to Várkesző, Egyházaskesző and Szentpéter to guard his rear from an eventual Hungarian attack.

On 28 June at 10–11, the latter decided to attack with 14 cavalry companies, 6 battalions, and 21 cannons, hoping to force them to retreat to Mórichida. General György Klapka's (2nd in charge of the main army after Görgei) chief of general staff, Mayor Péter Szillány, ordered Poeltenberg to position his troops between Ménfő, Kismegyer, and Szabadhegy, and to stop the imperial advance. Poeltenberg hoped that, during his attack at Ménfő, Kmety would prevent the imperial's southern wing to reinforce the troops he planned to attack.

Kmety started the fight with the Austrian Gerstner brigade on 27 June, in the Battle of Ihász.

=== Opposing forces ===
The Hungarian Kmety division (Note: The number of the soldiers of the division are from the battle order from 19 June 1849.)
Commander: Colonel György Kmety Chief of staff: Captain Ignác Albert

1. (Pongrácz) brigade;

- 10. Honvéd battalion = 439 soldiers;
- 23. Honvéd battalion = 660 soldiers;
- 33. Honvéd battalion = 692 soldiers;
- 2 companies of the 12. (Nádor) Hussar Regiment = 290 soldiers, 247 horses with saddles;

2. (Üchritz) brigade;

- 45. Honvéd battalion = 656 soldiers, 2 horses with saddles, 14 horses for traction;
- 124. (2. Beszterce) Honvéd battalion = 610 soldiers, 20 horses for traction;
- 2 companies of the 1. Jäger division = 289 soldiers;
- 1 company of the 1. sapper battalion = 101 soldiers;
- 6 companies of the 10. (Wilhelm) Hussar Regiment = 614 soldiers, 667 horses;

Artillery;

- 9. cavalry battery = 123 soldiers, 9 horses with saddles, 92 horses for traction, 7 cannons;
- 9. infantry battery = 152 soldiers, 18 horses with saddles, 92 horses for traction, 8 cannons;
- 1 Congreve rocket battery = 34 soldiers, 3 horses with saddles, 30 horses for traction, 2 rocket launching racks;
- 2. Auxiliary ammunition magazine = 32 soldiers, 24 horses for traction;

Conscripts;

- Armed conscripts = 500 men.

Total: 5,092 soldiers, 952 horses with saddles, 272 horses for traction, 15 cannons, 2 rocket launching racks;

The Austrian Gerstner brigade (Note: The number of the soldiers of the brigade is from the battle order from 11 July 1849.)
Commander: Lieutenant General Adolf Schütte Edler von Warensberg Commander of the brigade: Major General Joseph Gerstner Edler von Gerstenkorn

- 19. kaiserjäger battalion = 697 soldiers;
- 3. battalion of the 20. (Welden) infantry regiment = 983 soldiers;
- 4. battalion of the 20. (Welden) infantry regiment = 859 soldiers;
- 3. battalion of the 30. (Nugent) infantry regiment = 815 soldiers;
- Landwehr battalion of the 30. (Nugent) infantry regiment = 786 soldiers;
- Lieutenant colonel division of the 6. (Ficquelmont) dragoon regiment = 294;
- 9. six-pounder infantry battery = 96 soldiers, 6 cannons.

The number of the soldiers of the Gerstner brigade is from the battle order from 11 July 1849. If we add to this the number of casualties of the battle of Ihász (272), and estimate the dropouts in the period between 27 June and 11 July to 100, then the total number of the brigade will be around 4,902 soldiers and 6 cannons.

== Battle ==
The Gerstner brigade had around 5,000 soldiers and an infantry battery with around six 8-pound cannons, while the Hungarians had around the same number of soldiers with 15 cannons and 2 rockets. The Gerstner brigade advanced in battle position from the bridgehead of Várkesző to the southern end of Marcaltő in two columns. The first was composed of two battalions, and the other column of three battalions, including 6 cannons and two dragoon companies. Two battalions remained to guard the bridge of Marcaltő.

The imperial brigade continued towards Lesháza. Arriving on the heights above Lesháza, the Austrians saw Kmety's troops around the Ihász farm. Kmety positioned his troops in three lines.

The first was formed by the 33rd, 45th, and 124. (2nd Besztercebánya) battalions. He initially put a cavalry battery in the middle, positioned in the interspaces between the battalions, with 6 cannons and two howitzers, adding two cannons from an infantry battery (later the battery was sent on the edge of the right flank). Here were deployed 4 companies of Vilmos Hussars. Kmety commanded his troops from there.

The second line was formed by the 10th and 23rd battalions, organized in platoon masses of 2 companies each. The wings were made of 4 companies, two companies on each flank, made up of the Nádor and the Vilmos-Hussars.

The 3rd line was the reserve: on the left wing were two companies of jaegers, a newly formed battalion, the 9th infantry battery, and a half rocket battery.

The Ihász farm included several houses. Kmety's opinion was that the alignment was disadvantageous for a battle, claiming that he only accepted it to save his army's honor.

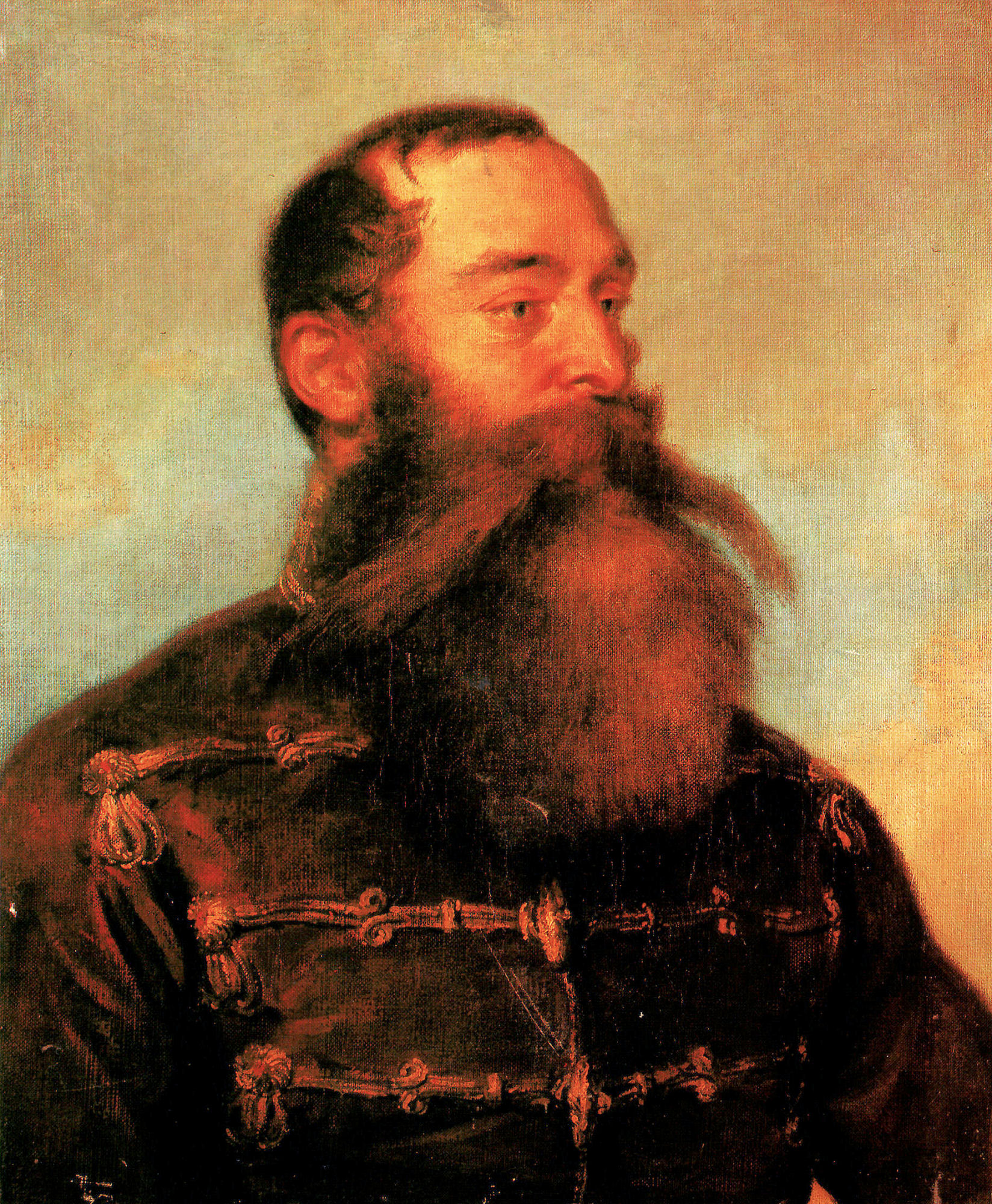
Brocky Károly: Kmety György

After the battle Kmety was criticized by his officer Emil Üchtritz, for positioning his cavalry where they could not charge at full speed, and for not deploying all his artillery. He also claimed that he tried to convince Kmety to position the Hungarian troops 6,5–8 km ahead, to deploy the left wing around the Leháza farm, where the terrain was suitable for the cavalry, and to position the artillery behind the farm, which would have pushed the Austrians into the river at Marcaltő, or force a surrender, but Kmety rejected him. Austrian reports after the battle noted that the Hungarians had made a mistake by not using the Lesháza farm.

Instead, the Landwehr battalion of the Nugent infantry from the advance guard of the Austrian troops occupied the farm, without opposition.

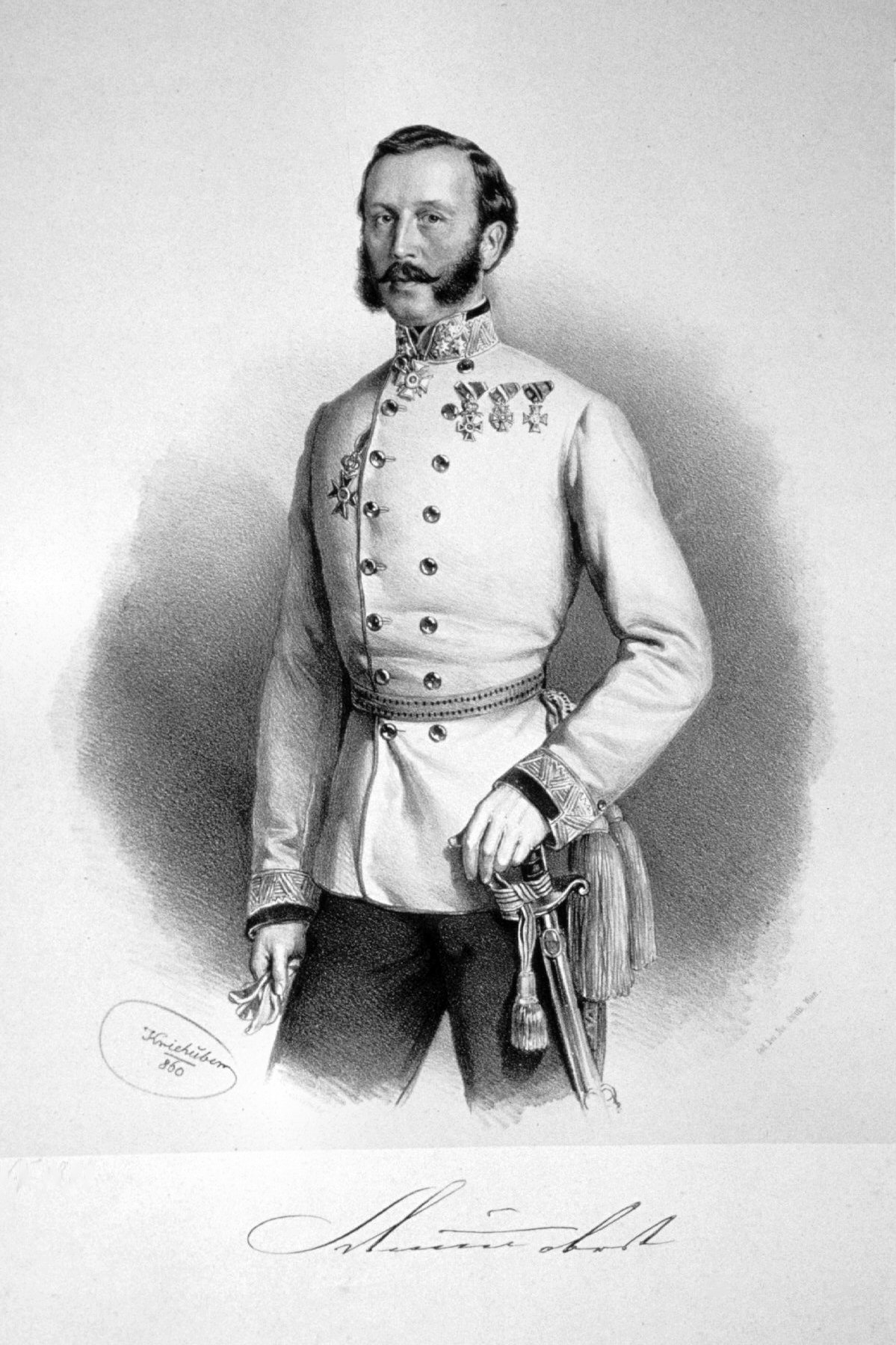
Adolf Schütte

The rest of the Austrian troops continued towards Ihász. After arriving, they took a position as follows: the first line on the left wing was the 3rd battalion of the Welden infantry. In the middle was the 3rd battalion of the Nugent infantry. In the right wing were four companies of the Landwehr battalion of the Nugent infantry, On the edge, two companies of the same unit held the farm. In the second line on the right wing was the 4th battalion of the Welden infantry. In the middle was the 19th Kaiserjäger battalion. After a while, these were sent in front of the Nugent infantry, because the leader of the imperial troops, Lieutenant General Adolf Schütte Edler von Warensberg, was not satisfied with the latter's battlefield behavior. The two companies of the Ficquelmont dragoons were positioned behind the infantry. Schütte positioned three cannons on each side of the road.

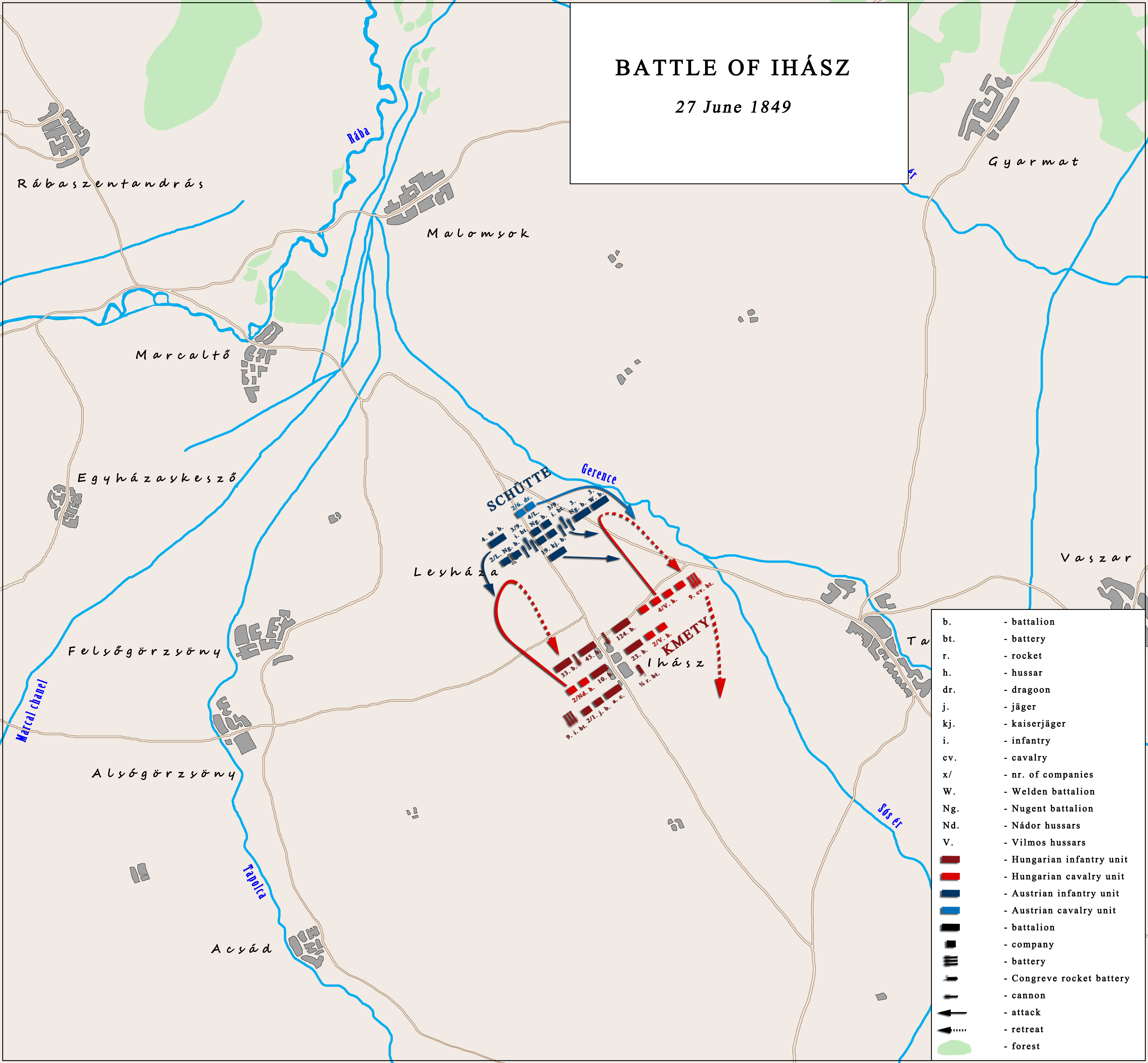
The battle of Ihász 27 June 1849

The Hungarian artillery started its fire during the imperial troop deployment, destroying one of their cannon, and causing important infantry losses. Schütte ordered his cannon to advance on the heights near Lesháza farm, and to launch a barrage from there, causing some losses to the Hungarian infantry. He then directed fire at Kmety and his staff, leading the Hungarian general to wave his hat every time the cannonballs missed their target. A Hungarian cannonball nearly killed the commander of the Welden infantry, Lieutenant-Colonel Schneider, who fell off his frightened horse, but then remounted.

Around 4 o'clock a Hungarian cavalry battery advanced, together with 6 companies of the Vilmos-hussars from the Hungarian right wing, to attack the 3rd battalion of the Welden infantry from the imperial left wing. At that time the 6-pound infantry battery from the Hungarian left advanced and caught the Austrian infantry in a crossfire. The cannon caused losses and disarray in the imperial's infantry quadrangle when a horse was killed by them, as the Hungarian hussars were approaching. The Austrian officers managed to quickly rearrange the quadrangle. Schütte sent two companies of dragoons and half of his infantry battery against the hussars. The half battery was hidden by a cornfield and behind a ditch, and allowed the hussars to approach to around 400 meters before unleashing heavy grapeshot against them, killing 15 men and 34 horses. Lieutenant Jenő Fekete was among the wounded: his leg was later amputated. The hussars from the left wing attacked, but they were halted by two companies of the Welden infantry.

At 6 o'clock Schütte ordered a general attack, with the 3rd battalion of the Welden infantry and two dragoon companies on the left wing, the 19th Kaiserjäger battalion in the middle, and the 4. battalion of the Welden infantry on the right wing. The Hungarian grapeshot caused 20 deaths among the advancing imperials. According to Lieutenant János Trskó, the cannonballs shot by the Hungarian cavalry artillery swept streets in the dragoon's mass. The Welden infantry's 4th battalion and the 19th Kaiserjäger battalion headed left to flank the Hungarian troops, but the Hungarian artillery's shots caused disarray. The imperial officers reorganized the troops and attacked the Hungarian artillery, which quickly retreated. Seeing this, Kmety ordered the retreat, which was covered by 6 companies of the Vilmos-hussars and a cavalry battery. The battle lasted from around 3:45-6 in the afternoon.

Historians argue about Kmety's retreat. He was not taught to be a cowardly commander, because two weeks earlier he had won the Battle of Csorna. Afterward, he claimed that he was preparing for a counterattack, when he suddenly saw imperial columns approaching from the flank and the back, threatening his troops with encirclement, leaving no option other than retreat. He was contradicted by several Hungarian officers, who saw nothing. According to Üchtritz, Kmety was informed that an imperial column was moving from Sárvár to Pápa, which could catch his troops in the middle. Among the causes of Kmety's retreat was that his troops had almost run out of ammunition and that some Hungarian cannons broke down because of the heavy firing.

At the end of the action 5 of the 6 horses that were pulling the last cannon covering the Hungarian troops' retreat, were killed by the imperial firing. An imperial battalion wanted to take advantage of this situation and seize that cannon, but a Hungarian half battalion pushed them back with a bayonet charge, helped by the cannon's grapeshot.

Kmety took position 3,5 km behind Ihász, but noting that nobody pursued them, he ordered his troops to retreat to Pápa. According to Schütte too, the Hungarians retreated in order, so he did not pursue.

== Aftermath ==
According to Kmety the Hungarian losses were 24 dead, 88 wounded and 32 horses lost. Schütte wrote that the Hungarians left 30 wounded with an officer on the battlefield and that they carried with them many dead soldiers on many wagons. According to Üchtritz, the Hungarians had 87 deaths and 110 wounded. Another source describes the loss of 5 officers and 105 soldiers. The Hungarians lost at most around 200 dead and wounded soldiers. But despite their victory, the Austrian losses were heavier: 65 deaths, 162 wounded, 50 missing (in total 277) soldiers, and 32 horses.

The most important result of this battle was that the nearly 5,000 soldiers of the Kmety division could not participate in the Battle of Győr, reducing Poeltenberg's force, which he needed against the nearly 70 000 troops of Haynau.

Lieutenant Colonel Hümér Kupa's two battalions, four Hussar companies, and 1 cavalry battery did not arrive in time to join the battle of Ihász, retreating to Szemere, where on 27 June, two infantry companies, cut off from Kmety's division, joined them. Poeltenberg sent three Honvéd battalions, a Tiroler jäger battalion, and a half infantry battery of 6-pound guns. Klapka too sent 4 hussar companies and a three-pound battery to Szabadhegy. These cavalry units went to Szemere, joining Kupa's detachment.

After the battle of Ihász Kmety rested his troops, preparing even to attack the enemy at Lovászpatona, but when he was informed that on 28 June the VII. corps lost the Battle of Győr, and retreated to Komárom, he too retreated on 29 June to Románd. On the same day, Colonel József Bayer from the Central Operational Bureau asked him to march to Komárom and join the main army, but he replied that his troops are too tired and in rags, almost on bare feet, and that the enemy cuts his way to Komárom. So he refused to join the Hungarian main army from Komárom, and to participate in the battle of Komárom from 2 July against the Austrian main army of Haynau. Instead, he marched on 30 June to Zirc and Várpalota, on 1 July to Bodajk, and on 2 July to Székesfehérvár, where he received the Governor-President of Hungary, Lajos Kossuth's order to march, through Paks, to southern Hungary, and cross the Danube–Tisza Interfluve, and to join the Army of Southern Hungary under the leadership of Lieutenant General Antal Vetter, operating against Lieutenant General Josip Jelačić's troops. Although many of his officers advised him to ignore Kossuth's order, and to move to Komárom, Kmety decided to follow the Governor's order. Many of the officers from Komárom, as well as General Artúr Görgei, believed that if Kmety's division would have marched towards Komárom, and would have attacked the troops of Haynau from the back at Nagyigmánd during the battle of 2 July, the Austrian main army would have been crushed.

After the battle the Gerstner brigade followed the Kmety division, watching their movements. Haynau feared that Kmety could return, and attack his troops by surprise. But the division continued his march toward the southeast, arriving on 5 July in Paks. But for a while he was reluctant to cross the Danube to the Danube–Tisza Interfluve, because he wanted to attack the Austrian garrison from Pécs, but Lieutenant General Lázár Mészáros the new Hungarian high commander (Artúr Görgei was removed by Kossuth) ordered him to renounce to his plan, and to participate in the campaign against Jelačić. So on 7 July, Kmety's division, crossed the Danube, ending his Transdanubian campaign.

== Sources ==
- Bánlaky, József (2001). A magyar nemzet hadtörténelme ("The Military History of the Hungarian Nation) (in Hungarian). Budapest: Arcanum Adatbázis.
- Bóna, Gábor (1987). Tábornokok és törzstisztek a szabadságharcban 1848–49 ("Generals and Staff Officers in the War of Independence 1848–1849") (in Hungarian). Budapest: Zrínyi Katonai Kiadó. p. 430. ISBN 963-326-343-3.
- Görgey, Artúr (2004). Életem és működésem Magyarországon 1848-ban és 1849-ben- Görgey István fordítását átdolgozta, a bevezetőt és a jegyzeteket írta Katona Tamás (My Life and Activity in Hungary in 1848 and in 1849). István Görgey's translation was revised by Tamás Katona, and also he wrote the Introduction and the Notes. Neumann Kht.
- Hermann, Róbert (1999). "Az ihászi ütközet emlékkönyve 1849-1999 (Commemorative Book of the Battle of Ihász 1849-1999)". mek.oszk.hu. Pápa.
- Hermann, Róbert (2001). Az 1848–1849-es szabadságharc hadtörténete ("Military History of the Hungarian War of Independence of 1848–1849") (in Hungarian). Budapest: Korona Kiadó. ISBN 963-9376-21-3.
- Hermann, Róbert (2004). Az 1848–1849-es szabadságharc nagy csatái ("Great battles of the Hungarian War of Independence of 1848–1849") (in Hungarian). Budapest: Zrínyi. ISBN 963-327-367-6.
- Schmidt-Brentano, Antonio (2007). Die k.k. bzw. k.u.k. Generalität: 1816-1918 ("Imperial and Royal Generals: 1816-1918") (in German). Wien: Österreichisches Staatsarchiv. p. 212.
