= Battle of Csorna =

- Part of the Hungarian Revolution of 1848
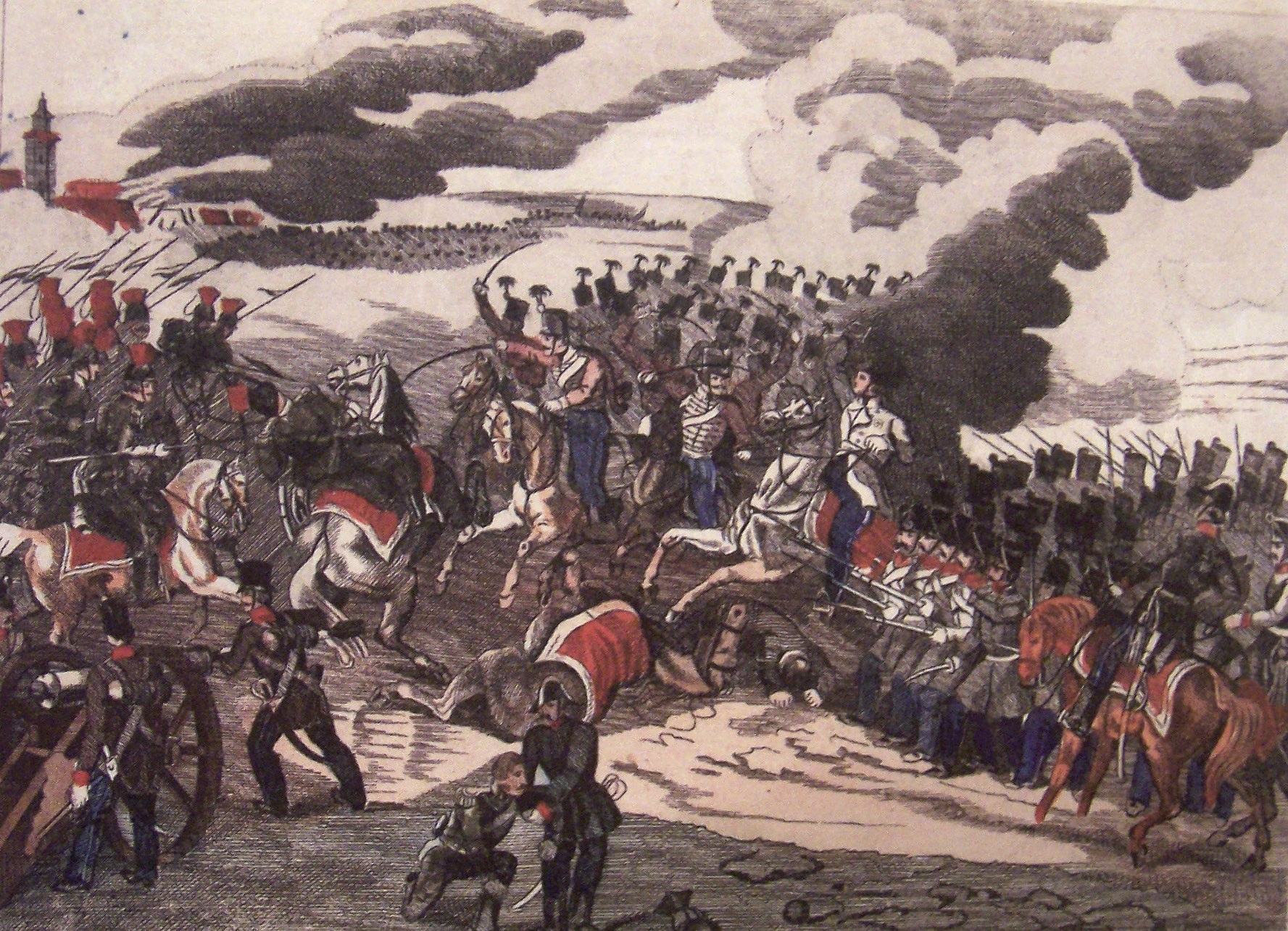
- Battle of Csorna by Johann Kratschmer
Date	13 June 1849
Location	around and in Csorna, Kingdom of Hungary 47.6167°N 17.2500°E
Result	Hungarian victory

Belligerents
Hungarian Revolutionary Army	Austrian Empire

Commanders and leaders
György Kmety	Franz Wyss †

Strength
5,002; 17 cannons	2,690; 8 cannons Did not participate: 2,026 men 3 cannons

Casualties and losses
215–271 killed or wounded	258 killed or wounded

The Battle of Csorna, fought on 13 June 1849, was one of the battles which took place in the Summer Campaign of the Hungarian War of Independence from 1848 to 1849, fought between the Habsburg Empire and the Hungarian Revolutionary Army. The Hungarian army was led by Colonel György Kmety, and the imperial army by Major General Franz Wyss. After liberation of the Hungarian capitals from the siege of Buda, the Hungarian commanders elaborated a plan to continue the Hungarian advance towards the Habsburg capital Vienna, before the arrival of the 200,000-strong army, sent by the Russian Empire to help the 170,000-strong Habsburg troops to crush the Hungarian revolution and freedom.

But before the real fighting started between the two main armies, the commander of the 15th division of the VII Hungarian army corps, Colonel György Kmety, attacked the imperial half brigade led by Franz Wyss by surprise, and in heavy fighting forced them to flee. During the retreat the imperial commander also received a fatal wound, dying on the battlefield. At the same time two other Hungarian detachments from the VII corps also won victories against Austrian troops, chasing them away from Öttevény and Kóny.

== Background ==
Thanks to the victories of the Spring Campaign, the Hungarian Revolutionary Army liberated much of Hungary from the occupation of the numerically and technologically superior Habsburg armies and their Serbian, Romanian and Croatian allies. The Hungarian army of Transylvania, led by Lieutenant General Józef Bem even managed to chase the first Russian intervention troops (7000 soldiers) out of the province, which had entered in the winter of 1849. From the end of March the Austrian politicians and military leaders understood that the Habsburg Empire was incapable of crushing their revolution relying on their own strength.

So, based on the Münchengrätz Agreements of 1833, according to which the Habsburg and Russian Empires and Prussia agreed to help each other if their sovereignty was threatened by a revolt or revolution, Austria decided to ask for Russian help against the Hungarian Revolution, although initially they were reluctant to do that, because they knew that it would lose them much prestige. But the Hungarian victories of the Spring Campaign made the Habsburg government take this unwanted step, and on 21 April, they officially requested help from Russia, followed by a letter from emperor Franz Joseph I of Austria to Tsar Nicholas I of Russia. So the Tsar decided to send 200,000 Russian soldiers to Hungary, putting another 80,000 in reserve, to enter Hungary if their presence would be needed. The Hungarian Government led by Bertalan Szemere and Governor President Lajos Kossuth believed that the European nations would not allow Russia to intervene in Hungary, but England and other European states agreed with a Russian intervention in order to crush the Hungarian revolution.

Thus Lord Palmerston replied to the question of the Russian ambassador about the reaction of England to a Russian intervention in Hungary, saying: "Finish them quickly!" demanding that after they fulfilled their task they return to Russia immediately. Although England worried about a Russian intervention in Hungary, its first concern was that the Russian Empire not advance in the Balkans, and an important condition for this was a strong Habsburg Empire. So, an independent Hungary could have been an impediment for England's world domination policy.

Meanwhile, after the capture of Buda General György Klapka, as the deputy minister of war, elaborated the plan for Hungarian military actions for summer, later called the Summer Campaign. His plan was based on the inactivity of the main Hungarian army corps, stationed around the fortress of Komárom. In case of retreat, he planned that the Hungarian capitals (Buda and Pest) and Miskolc would be the concentration point for Hungarian troops which were facing the main imperial forces under the command of Lieutenant Field Marshal Julius Jacob von Haynau, while the Hungarian troops from Transylvania and Southern Hungary had to accomplish heavy tasks that could be achieved only after relentless military actions in two months. In Klapka's plan, the Russian military intervention was only faintly mentioned without taking any measure against it. This plan was rejected by many of the Hungarian commanders (Józef Bem, Lieutenant General Henryk Dembiński), who said that they would not obey it. The Hungarian commander-in-chief and War Minister General Artúr Görgei also protested against this plan, underlining that Komárom should be the concentration point of the Hungarian troops instead of Miskolc, and because of the imminent threat of the Russian intervention, he saw that the only way open to the Hungarian army was to deal a decisive blow to the main imperial army before the slowly moving Russian forces arrived.

This would have forced Austria to enter talks, and offer some kind of settlement, with the Hungarians. So Görgei planned to attack the Austrian troops on the western border of Hungary as quickly as possible with the I, II, III and parts of the VIII corps on the left bank of the Danube, while the remainder of his troops had to protect the defensive line based on the Rába and Marcal rivers. Before the attack he hoped for the 12,000 soldiers led by Józef Bem, coming from the southern front and Transylvania, promised by Kossuth to arrive to join his forces (unfortunately Bem refused to come, saying that this would leave Transylvania defenseless against the imminent Russian invasion). The Hungarian armies in the beginning of the Summer Campaign consisted of 150,000 soldiers, 464 field and 393 defensive (castle) cannons.

On the other hand, the Austro-Russian coalition prepared to attack Hungary with 358,000 soldiers and 1354 cannons (165,000 Austrians with 770 cannons and 193,000 Russians with 584 cannons). While Russian and Austrian army groups, led by General Alexander von Lüders and General Eduard Clam-Gallas, prepared their attacks on Transylvania from Bucovina, Wallachia and Moldavia, (53,000 soldiers and 133 cannons against 39,000 Hungarians, who were mainly fresh recruits, and 107 cannons), the main Russian army under the lead of Field Marshal Ivan Paskevich had to advance from the north (135,000 Russian soldiers and 448 cannons against 16,500 Hungarians with 49 cannons), and the Austro-Croatian-Serbian troops led by Feldzeugmeister Josip Jelačić operated in Southern Hungary (53,000 soldiers with 401 cannons against 34,000 Hungarians and 249 cannons). The numerical disadvantage of the Hungarian armies was also augmented because 13% of the Hungarian troops in Transylvania and Eastern Hungary were used in the sieges of different fortifications in imperial hands (Arad, Temesvár, Gyulafehérvár, Titel) (around 12,000 men), while others (8000 men) were garrisons in different fortifications, so they could not be used as moving forces against the invading Austro-Russian armies.

From the west the imperial troops which were preparing to attack Hungary led by Lieutenant Field Marshal Haynau, the commander-in-chief of all the Habsburg forces outside Italy, were about 83,000 soldiers (71,000 Austrians and a 12,000-strong Russian army corps led by Lieutenant General Feodor Sergeyevich Panyutyin) and 336 cannons, against 51,000 Hungarian soldiers (including also the garrison of the fortress of Komárom) with 196 field and 244 defensive cannons used only in the fortifications, led by General Görgei.

== Prelude ==
So Görgei planned to attack Pozsony and Vienna quickly, before the main Russian army started attacking the eastern and northern front against Hungary. To this end he and his chief of the general staff, Lieutenant-Colonel József Bayer, organized the Central Operational Bureau (Központi Hadműveleti Iroda) at the end of May, in order to coordinate the movements of the different units of the Hungarian main army corps gathered in the western front. Besides the troops which the Central Operational Bureau disposed (I, II, III and parts of the VIII corps), on the western front was another army grouping to which the VII corps from the Rába line, led by Ernő Poeltenberg (from 6 May Colonel, and from 7 June General), and the garrison of Komárom (the VIII corps) belonged, and this was led by Major General György Klapka, commander of the garrison of Komárom. Klapka refused to submit to the orders of chief of the general staff József Bayer, acting independently.

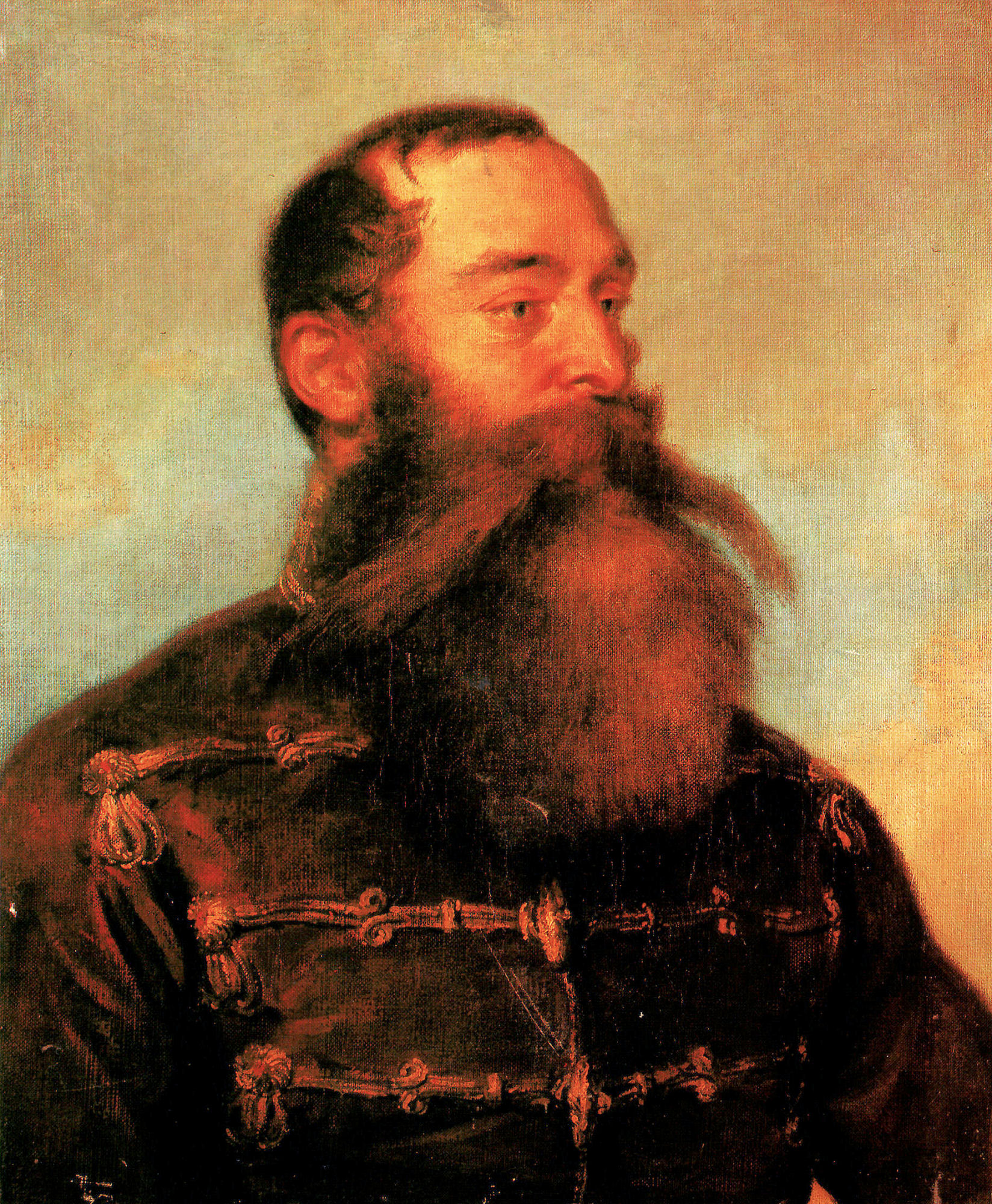
Brocky Károly: Kmety György

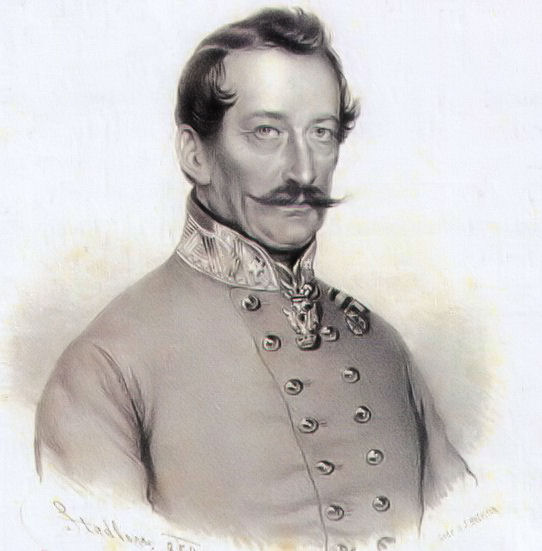
Franz Wyss

General Görgei sent the VII. corps led by General Poeltenberg to Győr and a detached division led by Colonel György Kmety to Pápa. Their mission was to gather reliable information on the enemy's strength and to impede his advance through smaller and greater skirmishes in the region of Hédervár, Öttevény, Kapuvár etc.

On 11 June the division led by Colonel György Kmety arrived at Pápa in order to secure the right wing of the VII corps. This division was not under the command of Klapka. The division, numbering 5002 men and 17 guns, had to reach the Rába through Székesfehérvár, near Pápa, to occupy the crossing points and destroy the bridges, except for the one at Marcaltő. Here he joined the left wing of the VII Corps and controlled the road between Sárvár-Veszprém-Székesfehérvár.

From a spy, Kmety heard that an imperial half brigade (2690 soldiers) led by Major General Franz Wyss was stationed in the city of Csorna. Kmety wanted to profit from this opportunity and decided to make a surprise attack against Csorna. The Wyss brigade was subordinate to the Imperial I. Corps under the command of Lieutenant General Franz von Schlik, with its headquarters at Magyaróvár. The brigade had to occupy Kapuvár and Csorna as a vanguard of the I. corps. The brigade was divided into 2 columns, Wyss marched to Csorna with 2,690 soldiers - 2 battalions, two Kaiserjäger companies, 4 uhlan squadrons - and 8 guns, while in Kapuvár he had 2,026 men - 2 battalions, 2 uhlan squadrons - and 3 guns.

The city was at 40 km distance from Pápa, requiring 16 hours of marching, an exhausting task for the Hungarian Honvéd troops, but he set his troops on the march. Kmety's division was characterized by a Honvéd officer in the "Győri Közlöny" newspaper: The ragged-looking, the worn-down division was superbly disciplined, accustomed to battle; - led by skilled officers, with unbounded confidence in its commander. Kmety himself was loved by his soldiers: gave nothing to his appearance, and he had his uniform made only for the occasion when he was sent to Kossuth with the news of the capture of Buda Castle. Otherwise, he wore a simple honvéd mackinaw, leather trousers, rider's boots with large spurs, mostly without any distinguishing marks, and an ordinary officer's cap (...) this was his winter and spring attire, until in the summer he replaced the mackinaw with a sleeveless coat (...) (Hazánk, 1888).

In order to make sure that nobody could inform the enemy, Kmety did not reveal his plan to his officers, saying that they were heading towards Győr. Only when they arrived at Marcaltő, at 12 June at night, did he send an envoy to inform Klapka and Colonel Lajos Zámbelly, the chief of the VII corps general staff about his plans. The imperial commander, Wyss, who came to Kapuvár on the 7th, and a day later with the majority of his troops to Csorna, suspected for some days that he would be attacked, but the Austrian commander did not send troops to his aid. Some other signs too made a Hungarian attack likely to happen. When Colonel Zessner, the commander of the 4th imperial lancer regiment headed to Kapuvár on his carriage without escort, to take the command of the troops stationed here, he was attacked in the neighborhood of Bogyoszló by Hungarian Hussars, who according to some accounts killed him when he defended himself, while the others say he surrendered but was killed later when he tried to escape. Because of this, Wyss lost one of his best officers, along with the plan of the location and strength of his units. Despite knowing about this, Wyss did not change anything in the positions of his troops.

Kmety planned to attack Csorna from the south and west, after crossing the Rába river. He said that the two bridges on the road through the Hanság mire were destroyed, so if his attack against Csorna would be successful, the imperials would have two options: to retreat towards the east, right where the Hungarian VII corps were stationed, or flee towards the north, entering the marshes of the Hanság, and both of these options would have forced them to surrender. This plan was not without risk because the other imperial half brigade, stationed at Kapuvár, could come to Wyss's rescue in 5 hours, while the Collery brigade could come from Szerdahely in 8–9 hours.

In Csorna, Franz Wyss had at his disposition 3 ½ companies from the 49. (Hess) infantry regiment, 6 companies from the Landwehr battalion of the 59. (Baden) regiment, 2 companies of the 14th Kaiserjägers battalion, 3 companies of the 4th lancer regiment (11 platoons), 4 cavalry cannons, and 2 rocket launching racks. Wyss positioned his troops for the defense of Csorna in the following way:

- On the exit road towards Farád, under the leadership of Major Ahsbahs:

- 1. company of the 59 (Baden) infantry regiment, joined later also by the 3. and 5. companies of the same regiment;
- 5 (later 6) platoons of the 2. Major division of the 4. (Imperial) Uhlan Regiment;
- 2 cavalry guns;
- 2 Congreve rocket launching racks.

- On the western exit road towards Szilsárkány under the leadership of Major Weiss:

- 2 companies of the 59 (Baden) infantry regiment;
- 2 cavalry guns.

- On the eastern exit road towards Szilsárkány under the leadership of Major Magner:

- 2 companies of the 49 (Hess) infantry regiment.

- On the western exit road towards Pásztori under the leadership of Major Patera:

- ½ company of the 49 (Hess) infantry regiment.

- On the eastern exit road towards Pásztori under the leadership of Captain Weiss:

- 2 companies of the 1. category of the 14. Kaiserjäger battalion.

- On the exit road towards Kóny:

- 1 company of the 49 (Hess) infantry regiment.

- The reserve in the center of Csorna:

- 2., 4. and 6. companies of the 59 (Baden) infantry regiment;
- 5 platoons of the 2. Major division of the 4. (Imperial) Uhlan Regiment.

On the southwestern end of Csorna was a cemetery, surrounded by a stone wall; it even had a trench very suitable for a defensive line, and from the right some banks, making the cemetery a very good place for an efficient defense. The region behind the graveyard and the marketplace in connection with it was very suitable for placing the reserves. In the background was a grange surrounded by walls and buildings with ditches on the left, and from the front, a poplar park made a second defense line.

=== Opposing forces ===
The Austrian Wyss brigade

In and around Csorna
- 3. battalion of the 49. (Hess) infantry regiment = 1024 soldiers (3 ½ companies);
- 1. Landwehr battalion of the 59. (Baden) infantry regiment = 832 soldiers (6 companies);
- 1. category of the 14. Kaiserjäger battalion = 245 soldiers (2 companies);
- 1. and 2. Major division of the 4. (Imperial) Uhlan Regiment = 434 soldiers, 434 horses (4 companies);
- 8. cavalry battery = 131 soldiers, 146 horses, 6 cannons;
- 1/3 Congreve rocket battery = 24 soldiers, 26 horses, 2 rocket launching racks;
Total: 2690 soldiers, 606 horses, 6 cannons, 2 rocket launching racks; (Note: These troops will participate, from the Austrian side, in the battle of Csorna.)

In and around Kapuvár
- 3. battalion of the 29. (Schönhals) infantry regiment = 837 soldiers;
- 4. battalion of the 1. (Lika) border guard infantry regiment = 905 soldiers;
- 2 companies of the Colonel division of the 4. (Imperial) Uhlan Regiment = 230 soldiers, 230 horses;
- 34. infantry 1/2 battery = 54 soldiers, 41 horses, 3 cannons;
Total: 2026 soldiers, 271 horses, 3 cannons;

The Hungarian Kmety division
- 10. Honvéd battalion = 450 soldiers;
- 23. Honvéd battalion = 720 soldiers;
- 33. Honvéd battalion = 700 soldiers;
- 45. Honvéd battalion = 830 soldiers;
- 2. Honvéd battalion from Beszterce = 750 soldiers;
- 2 companies of the 1. Jäger division = 280 soldiers;
- 1 company of sappers = 80 soldiers;
- 2 companies of the 12. (Nádor) Hussar Regiment = 300 soldiers, 300 horses;
- 4 companies of the 10. (Wilhelm) Hussar Regiment = 423 soldiers, 430 horses;
- 2 companies of the 10. (Wilhelm) Hussar Regiment = 200 soldiers, 200 horses;
- 9. infantry battery = 122 soldiers, 76 horses, 7 cannons;
- 9. cavalry battery = 101 soldiers, 85 horses, 8 cannons;
- 1 Congreve rocket battery = 46 soldiers, 29 horses, 2 rocket launching racks;
Total: 5002 soldiers, 1120 horses, 15 cannons, 2 rocket launching racks;

== Battle ==
Kmety departed from Pápa on 12 June, and after his troops arrived at the destination, crossing the Rába river at Malomsok, they started the attack on 13 June at dawn. He had his sappers make two bridges in order to secure his troops' retreat if needed, and left a hussar company in Marcaltő. The Hungarian troops at Szilsárkány, which prepared to attack from the south, stumbled on an imperial patrol made of lancer cavalry (Uhlans) and captured one of them, but the others rode away. So it was a real danger, that Wyss and the Austrian troops around Csorna would be informed about the coming Hungarian attack. Kmety sent the cavalry of the Hungarian column which he wanted to send to Farád to cut the way of the imperials and their envoys towards Kapuvár. At Szilsárkány, Kmety divided his troops for the attack. He sent the Lieutenant-Colonels Emil Üchritz and László Pongrácz to lead the 10th, 23rd, and 33rd Honvéd battalions with five companies of Vilmos (Wilhelm) Hussars and the 9th cavalry battery to the enemy's rear, on the route: Bogyoszló – Jobbaháza – Farád. He himself, with the 45th and 2nd Honvéd battalions, 2 jaeger companies, 2 companies of Nádor Hussars, an infantry battery, and 2 Congreve rocket launching racks marched through Szilsárkány and Pásztori to Csorna. So he planned to attack Csorna from three directions.

When Emil Üchritz's troops were passing through Jobbaháza, the Lieutenant-Colonel learned that 15 Hungarian soldiers had been taken prisoners by a patrolling Uhlan platoon. These cavalry troops, together with an infantry company and two cavalry batteries, were stationed on an embankment between Kóny and Csorna. At Bősárkány a half infantry company with an Uhlan platoon were also stationed. These troops had the mission of observing the region to learn about Hungarian movements, and to keep the connection with the I imperial Army Corps. The Uhlan patrols' commander, lieutenant Chamot, after taking the Hungarian prisoners at Jobbaháza, heard the first roar of the cannons from Csorna, signalling the start of the battle, and in order to prevent his soldiers from being cut off by the enemy, decided to retreat towards Kapuvár. But right then, the Hungarian Vilmos-Hussars attacked, so the Uhlans retreated in haste, letting the prisoner soldiers loose, who thus could return to their comrades.

The column led by Lieutenant-Colonels Emil Üchritz and László Pongrácz advanced on and along the road from Farád to Csorna, as follows: North from the road, the two companies of the Vilmos-hussars; on the road the 9th cavalry battery advanced; south from the road the 23rd and leftwards from it the 10th battalion, both having a line of skirmishers at their front lines. The 33rd battalion followed them as reserve troops.

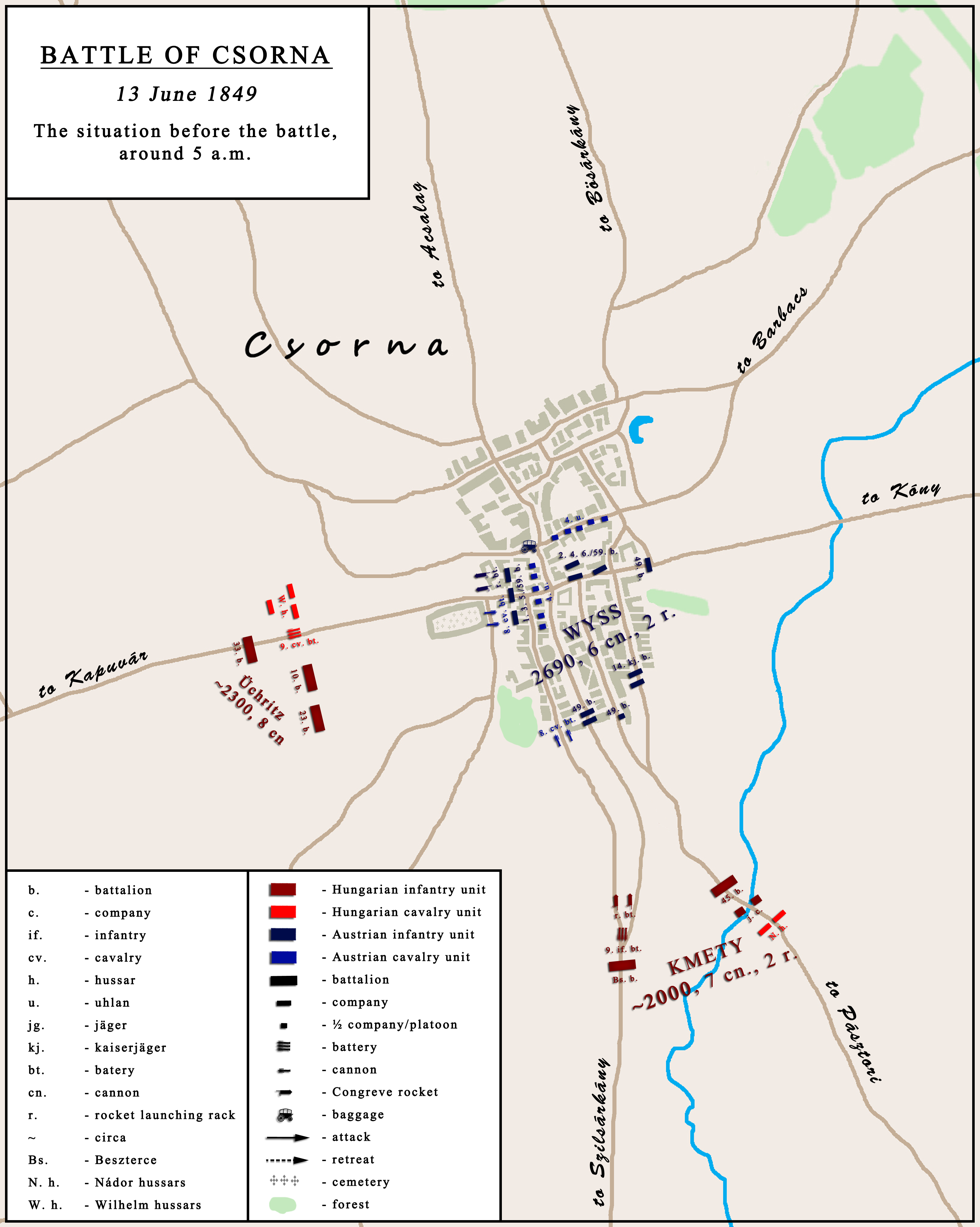
Battle of Csorna (13 June 1849). Situation around 5ː00 a.m

Wyss received news from its Uhlan patrol about the 400 Hungarian troops at Szilsárkány, but he did not get concerned, thinking that they were only an isolated scout unit, so at 4:30 o'clock in the morning he commanded his troops to march out from Csorna in order to capture them. He also sent envoys to his outposts from Bágyog, Kóny, and to the half brigade from Kapuvár to advance towards Csorna. But none of the envoys arrived at their destinations.

Shortly after that, at 4:45 o'clock, Wyss received news that some troops were advancing from the southeast, but he explained that they were the imperial battalions from the 29th infantry regiment, for which he was waiting. He sent a patrol to meet them, thanks to whom he finally learned that these were actually Hungarian soldiers. Hearing this, Wyss took a platoon of the Uhlans and went towards the southern part of Csorna in the direction of Szilsárkány. The advance of the Hungarians was so quick that they started to fire on Csorna from three directions, long before the imperials installed their cannons. The surprised imperials responded well, installing their cannons and troops in a hurry, in the heavy attack and fire of the Hungarians. The attack occurred at 5 o'clock, according to Kmety and 5:15 or 5:30 o'clock, according to the Austrians, and although - according to their pre-battle reports - they were expecting this to happen, the extraordinary quickness of the Hungarian attack took them by surprise.

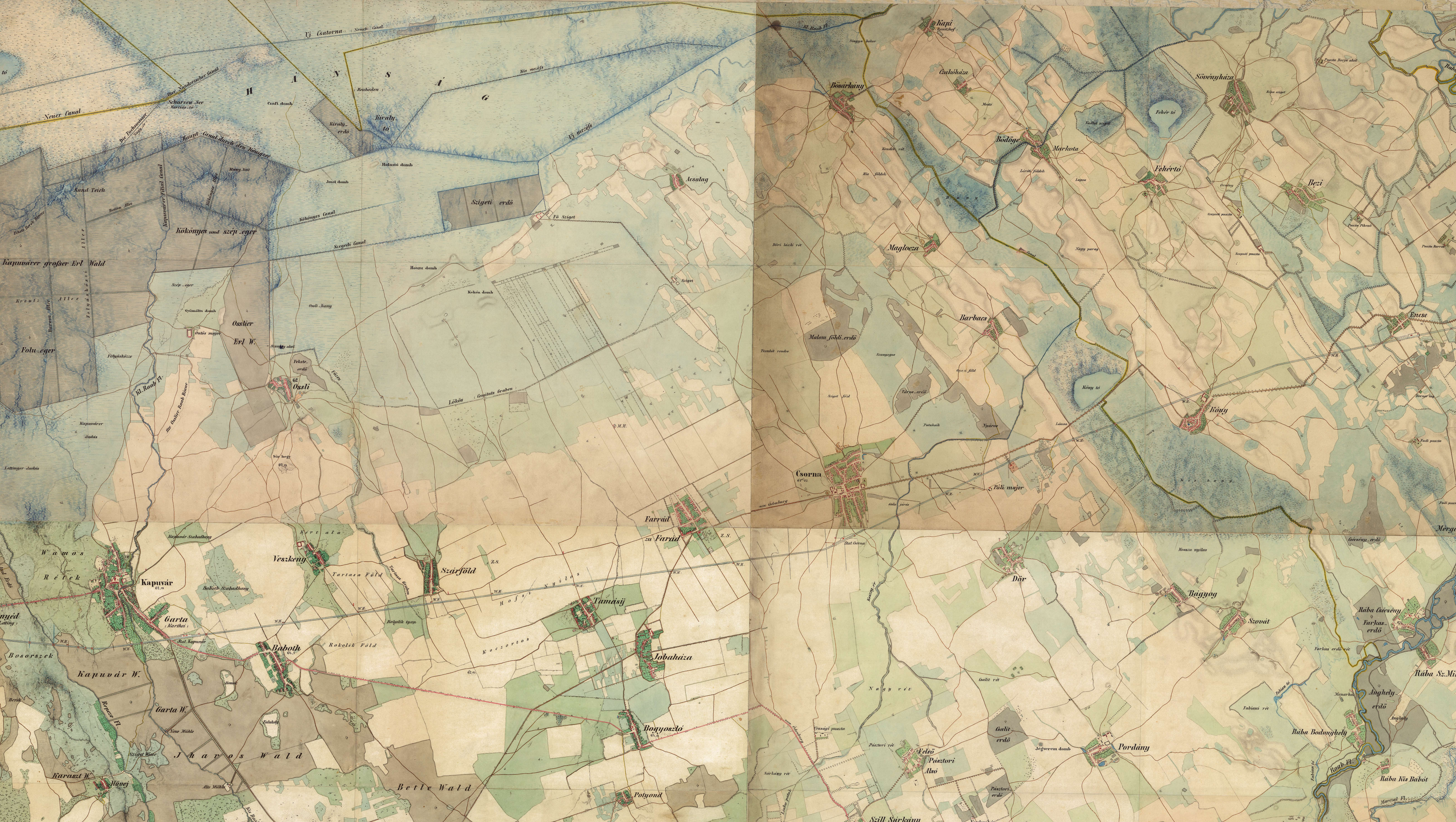
Location of the Battle of Csorna

Wyss sent his baggage from Csorna to Bősárkány, guarded by two platoons of the Imperial uhlans. To cut their way, Üchritz sent two companies of the Vilmos-hussars together with the 9th cavalry battery. The hussars, led by Captain Wladyslaw Dzwonkowski, advanced slowly and when they observed the uhlans, who were north-east of the cemetery, attacked them, but because of the deep and wide trench, they could hurdle with their horses only one by one, so the uhlans waited them on the other side of the trenches and stabbed many of them to death with their lances. Then the uhlans attacked the Hussars, chasing them away, while another three platoons were sent to the uhlans' aid. In the skirmish also Captain Wladyslaw Dzwonkowski was killed. Three new uhlan platoons arrived, and attacked the Hungarian hussars from the sides, who just before were strengthened by a company of the Vilmos-hussars, and led by this started a counterattack. As a result of this, the Hussars were forced to retreat again, both sides suffering great losses, augmented by the Hungarian cavalry battery which, during all this time, shot in the uhlans. Then another 6 uhlan platoons arrived, with two cannons and two rockets, together with the 59. (Baden) infantry regiment.

In the meantime, the 1. company of the 59. regiment entered the wood west from Csorna and chased the Hungarian infantry out, but when the Hungarian artillery opened fire, and the Hungarians counterattacked with reinforcements, the Austrians had to retreat to the town. The 3rd and 5th companies of the 59. (Baden) regiment, with two cannons, positioned themselves on the road towards Kapuvár and in the cemetery, while the 2nd, 4th, and half of the 6th companies defended the western exit towards Szilsárkány, while the other half of the 6th company had the mission of maintaining the connection with the infantry from the 49. (Hess) regiment.

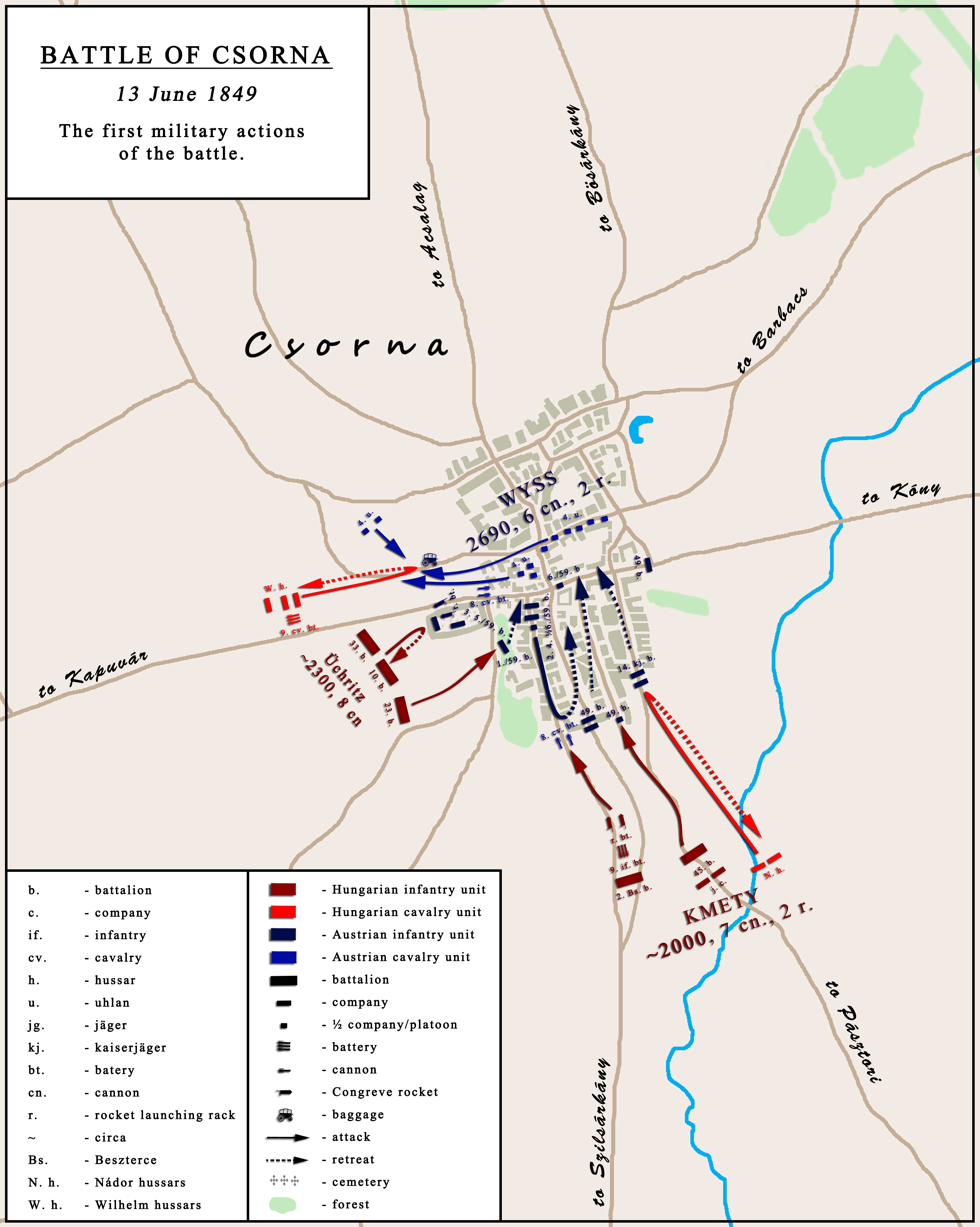
Battle of Csorna (13 June 1849). The Hungarian troops start the attack

The 10th and 23d Hungarian Honvéd battalions started an attack on the cemetery, while the imperials tried to stop them with rocket-shots, but with little success. On the narrow road towards the cemetery, the soldiers from the Hungarian lines intermingled and lost their coordination, and the officers lost control of them. Many of them pressed to the stone wall of the cemetery, so the 1st, 3d and 5th companies of the 59. regiment could easily repulse them and counterattack. The enemy fire also did its job mainly to the 5th Hungarian company, which was face to face with the imperial cannons.

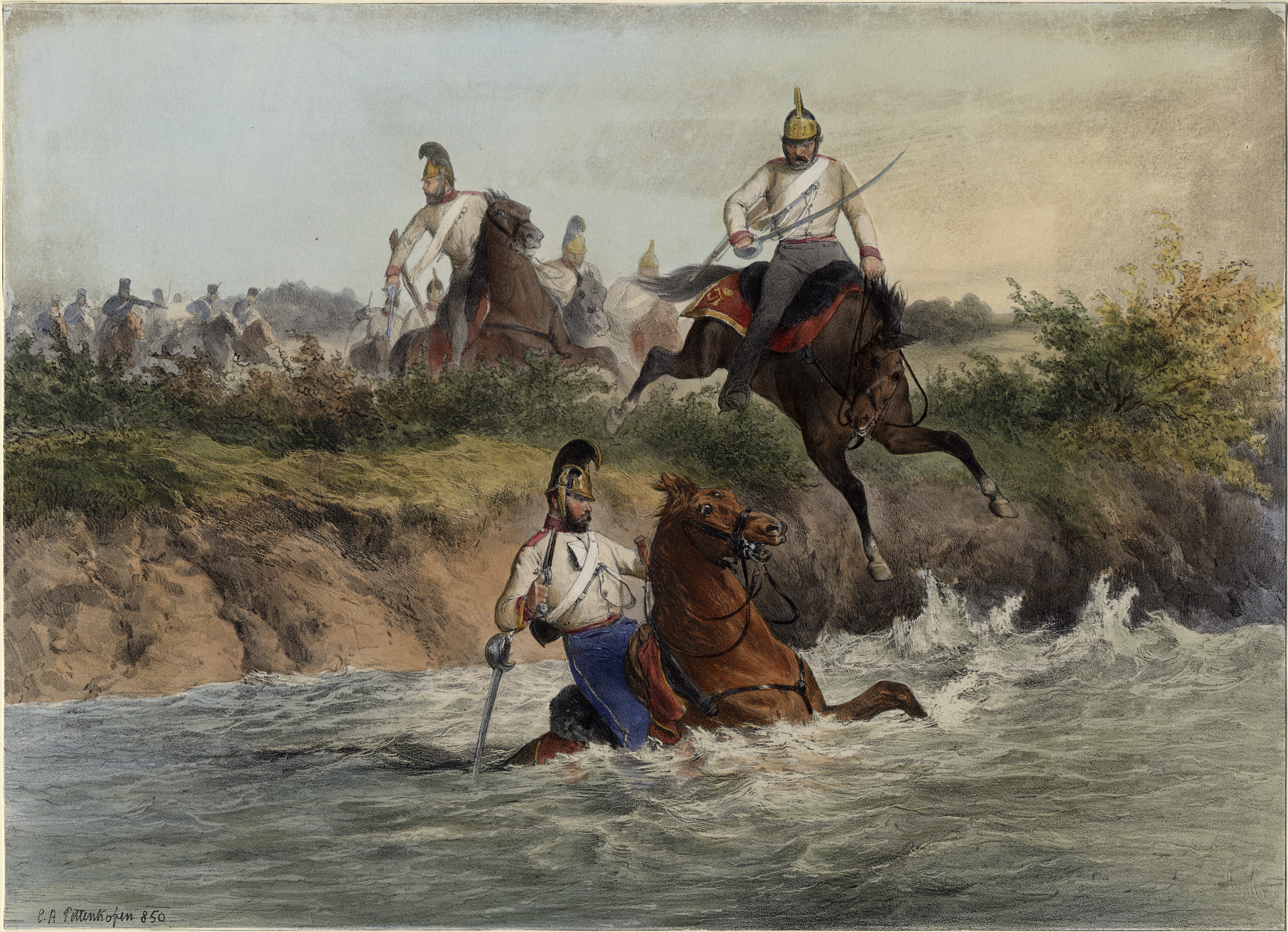
Fleeing Austrian dragoons, chased by Hungarian Hussars, August von Pettenkofen

At the southern part of Csorna, the Hungarian troops led directly by Colonel Kmety attacked in three columns.

Through the eastern road coming from Szilsárkány, attacked the 2. Honvéd battalion from Beszterce led by Major Mikovényi, helped by the infantry battery. (Note: Here the book of historian Róbert Hermann writes that the Beszterce battalion was helped by the 9. cavalry battery,. but in reality, they were the 9. infantry battery, as it is shown on page 26. But the cavalry battery was in the column of Üchritz, which attacked from the west, the direction of Farád.) They were received by a company of the 49 (Hess) regiment, while another company was in reserve; half of them were sent to help the 2nd, 4th and 6th companies of the 59. regiment, pushed back by the Hungarians, as shown before. Left from them were two companies of the 14th Kaiserjaeger battalion. The Hungarian advance led by Mikovényi stopped after the Major was wounded on his knee.

From the direction of Pásztori the 45th Honvéd battalion, two companies of Jägers, and two companies of the Nádor-hussars advanced. On one road half a company of the 49. (Hess) infantry regiment, while on the other 2 companies of the 14th Kaiserjaeger battalion opposed them. Captain Weiss, their commander made a skirmish line out of the half battalion of Kaiserjaegers and positioned them in the trenches; he also put two platoons in the background to left and right, and made a barricade from carriages, beams, and boards, and put the remaining company soldiers behind them. After repulsing, with the salvos of the Kaiserjägers, the first attack of the Nádor-hussars, Captain Weiss ordered a continuously fighting retreat of his troops, because he knew that the 59. regiment which fought right from his troops was retreating, so he did not want to be encircled. The Hungarian 45th battalion was advancing on the street, together with the two Jäger companies, (Note: Some sources affirm that the 45th battalion's attack was joined also by the Nádor hussars, but others claim that they participated in the famous skirmish with the Austrian uhlans at the Western edge of Csorna.) putting the imperials at risk of being cut in half, but Wyss arrived just in time with reinforcements, sending the 49. (Hess) infantry regiment against them, who together with the Kaiserjaegers pushed the Hungarians back to the entrance of Csorna. But here the Hungarians got a foothold in the houses east of the street, enabling a cavalry battery to join the battle and shoot grapeshot at the Kaiserjaegers and pushing two cannons forward, against which the Kaiserjaegers made an attack. But when a Hungarian Hussar platoon arrived, they retreated to their positions.

In the meanwhile, the Hungarians attacking Csorna on the western road which came from Szilsárkány faced the 2nd and 4th companies of the 59. (Baden) infantry regiment, supported by two cavalry batteries which unleashed grapeshot, causing them to disperse, but when the Hungarian artillery started to fire on the imperial battery, they too retreated. Wyss saw the danger and tried to convince the battery to reenter the battle, but with no success. Using this opportunity, the Hungarian infantry regrouped and entered into Csorna at that place. They advanced to the building of the tavern, but the counterattack of the 2nd infantry company, strengthened with units from the 49 (Hess) infantry regiment, caused them to retreat. In the attack the commander of the Austrian infantry, Major Weiss was wounded twice, and his place was taken by Captain Hörnes, who led these troops retreat towards the center of Csorna. The 2nd and 4th companies and half of the 6th company retreated towards the city's main square, followed by the Hungarians. The imperial artillery fired grapeshot, but after the Hungarian soldiers regrouped, they started to advance again. Wyss ordered his Uhlan cavalry to attack the Hungarian infantry, in order to enable to his infantry to attack. The Hungarians retreated from the attack of the uhlans, but some of them went into the houses and behind the fences, while others regrouped in the end of the street in a mass, and unleashed a fusillade against the imperial cavalry, who therefore started to retreat. But on their way back they were caught in the fire of the Hungarians who hid behind fences and in houses, inflicting heavy losses, forcing them to retreat further. After half an hour of fighting the Hungarians advanced until the main square. At the square between the convent and the tavern, the Kaiserjaegers tried to make a stand, but the salvo of the Hungarian Honvéds forced them to retreat. After harsh fighting, the Hungarians cut the imperial troops in two: the right wing which was at the exit of Csorna towards Kapuvár, and the left wing which was on the exit towards Kóny.

When the retreating companies of the 49. (Hess) regiment arrived just outside of Csorna and started to gather, they were attacked by a Hungarian battalion that entered Csorna through the gardens and houses from the eastern part of the city, cutting their way towards Kóny, while to their right was another Hungarian battalion, with some hussars and two cannons, which started to fire on them. At that moment two imperial Kaiserjaegers companies also joined the 49. infantry regiment, and together they managed to retreat towards Bősárkány through Barbacs and Markota, covered by the skirmish-line of the Kaiserjaegers.

Between 8 and 9 o'clock, Wyss sent Lieutenant Bujanovics with the order that his troops fighting throughout Csorna must retreat towards the exit of the city leading to Bősárkány, in order to retreat together in an organized way. The troops in most cases were already retreating because of the pressure of the Hungarians. Many of these troops however did not follow Wyss's order, and retreated in haste towards the villages nearest to them, which shows that at that time the Hungarian troops had cut the majority of the roads on which they could fulfill their commander's order.

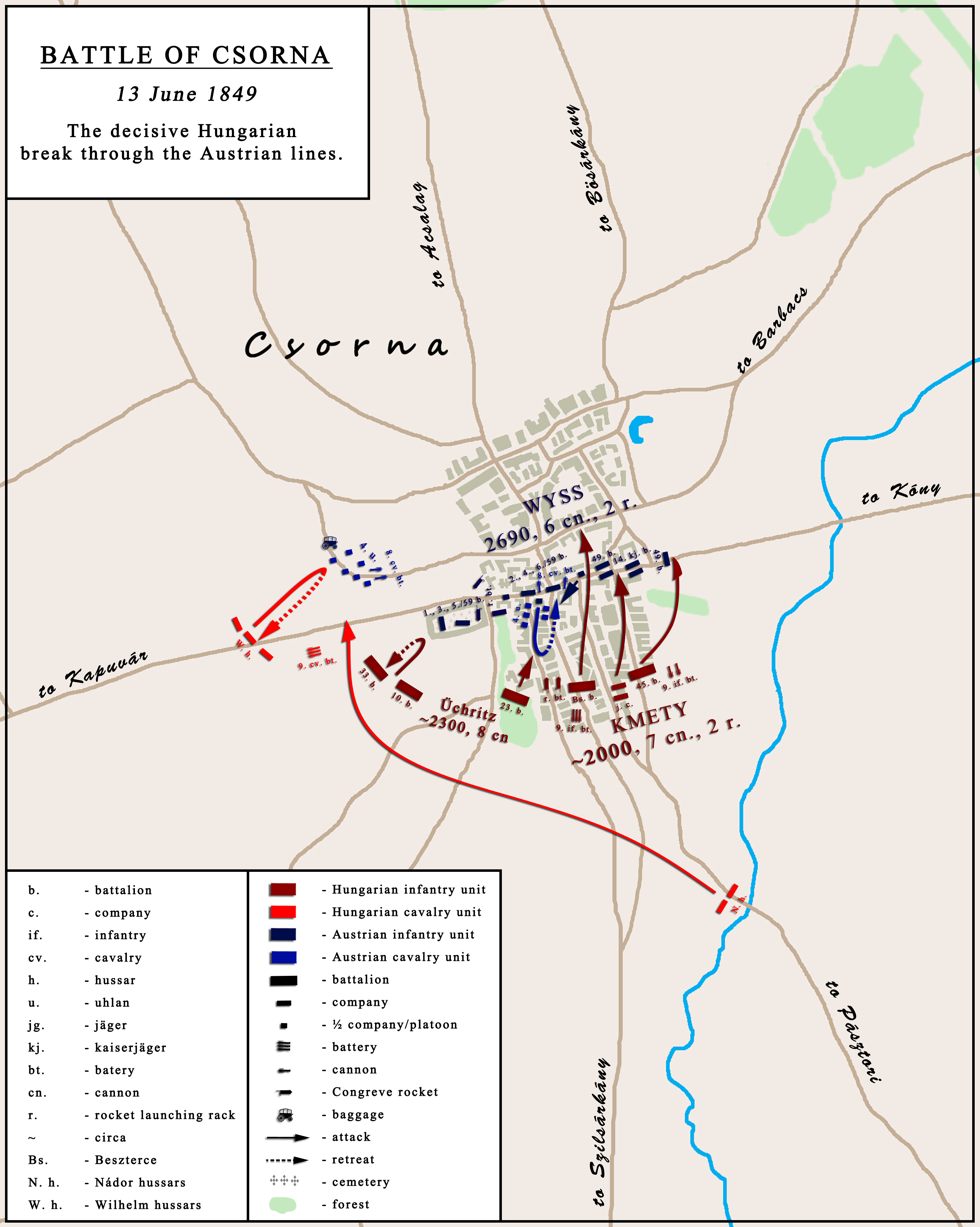
Battle of Csorna (13 June 1849). The Hungarian breakthrough in the center of the city

At this moment two companies of the Nádor-hussars arrived on the scene (north-east from the cemetery) of the place where the Vilmos Hussars and the Austrian uhlans fought with each other, and the uhlans were ready to retreat with Wyss's baggage towards Bősárkány. The Nádor hussars were formerly at the southern end of the town, but it seems that after the unsuccessful actions of the Vilmos-hussars, they came here and started an attack against the uhlans, then withdrew in a feigned retreat, and at a proper moment counterattacked, taking the uhlans by surprise, and pushed them on the Hungarian infantry lines, inflicting heavy losses. However, the hussars too had great losses, and in the end, the remaining uhlans managed to secure the retreat of the baggage towards Bősárkány. The encounter of the hussars with the uhlans was described by the writer, historian, former revolutionary Alajos Degré, then a Hussar captain, with words of praise: The cavalry charge at Csorna was also amazing when the Emperor's Uhlan Regiment, the most famous cavalry [unit] of the Austrian army, arrived from Italy and asked to be sent against the Nádor Hussars, and they went toe-to-toe in wheat up to the horse's breast. [Captain] Dénes Dessewffy was stabbed with a lance in the stomach which came out through his back. He was saved from death by the fact that he had not eaten for thirty-six hours [...] Four times the Nádor-Hussars repulsed the Uhlans, who lined up for the fifth time to fight. At this fifth engagement, the divisions of both sides were now commanded by non-commissioned officers, as all the senior officers were [wounded or dead] on the ground. The memoirs of Major Ferenc Karsa add to this: It was also interesting that the Nádor hussars [...] rushed to attack [over and over] in small groups without waiting for the command. In order to curb this, platoon commander D. issued the order of the day, "Whoever gets his sword bloodied before mine gets twenty-five sticks" [beating]. Kmety in his post-battle, among other soldiers, nominated for the 3. class order of merit two men from the 12. (Nádor) Hussar Regiment: Captain Dénes Dessewffy, for continuing to participate in the fight with his hussars even after taking 2 severe lance-wounds, and the hussar József Balla-Rigó for single-handedly repulsing the attack of 8 Austrian uhlans. At the end of the fight, 92 Austrian Uhlans were dead or wounded, while the Hungarian Hussars had only 31 (according to other sources 36) casualties.

Meanwhile, the 23rd and a part of the 10th Hungarian Honvéd battalion, getting around the cemetery and the trenches from the right, entered the streets. Lieutenant-Colonel László Pongrácz led the charge taking the flag of the 10th battalion, with the help of the 2nd Beszterce battalion, pushing the 1st, 3rd and 5th companies of the 59. (Baden) infantry regiment from the cemetery.

These together with the five platoons of uhlans were the first units to reach Bősárkány, then retreated towards Szentpéter. While these followed a straight road towards Bősárkány, the other imperial columns used roundabout roads in their retreat, showing signs of disorder and panic, because they feared that the Hungarians closed their retreat way.

In the meantime the half company of the 49. infantry regiment which was in the entrance towards Pásztori, also started to retreat, followed a little later by the imperial troops at the entrance towards Szilsárkány, who retreated not through the street, but through the gardens, fearing an ambush. The retreating 1 ½ company of the 49. infantry regiment, half of the 6th company of the 59. regiment, and two cannons met at the exit of the city towards Kóny; then Wyss commanded them to retreat towards Bősárkány on the Barbacs-Markota road. Wyss did not follow them, but retreated to Csorna, although Captain Zerboni said to him that there were no imperial units left there, and that they were the last Austrians to leave the town.

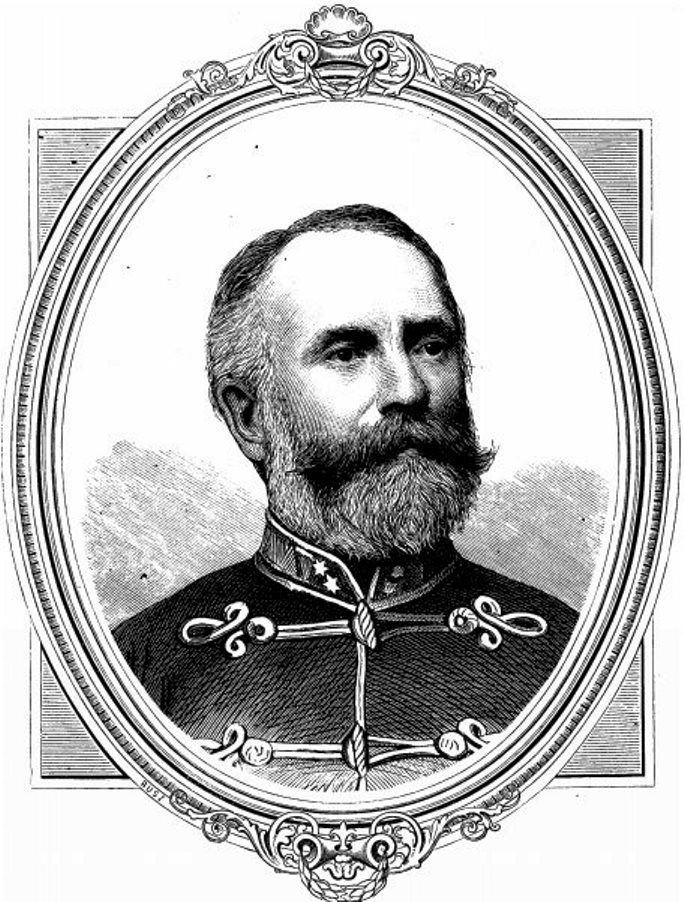
Pongrácz László

Bujanovic then returned to Wyss, who sent him back to the right flank with the request that, if possible, the troops there should also withdraw towards Wyss's position, so that the brigade could retreat in unity. Bujanovich tried to get to the right flank, but the streets were already occupied by the Honvéds, so he tried to get there by bypassing Csorna from the north. He did not succeed in this either, but on the road to Barbacs he found Colonel Castelnau leading 3 platoons of uhlans, 2 companies of 59. (Baden) infantry regiment and 2 guns. Soon, two companies of the 49. regiment appeared on the northeastern edge of the settlement, as well as 2 Kaiserjäger companies, which were mentioned earlier. Here Bujanovics took over the leadership of all these Austrian units. He sent Captain Jósika with 3 platoons of uhlans to ride ahead, and meet with the 4 companies of infantry (the 2 companies of 49. regiment and the 2 companies of Kaiserjägers), but they stumbled in 45. Honvéd battalion, which immediately formed a square against the attacking uhlans, who gave up the attack. Castelnau tried to help the uhlans by sending also his cannons to shoot in the 45. battalion, but they also gave up, when 6 platoons of hussars attacked from the left.

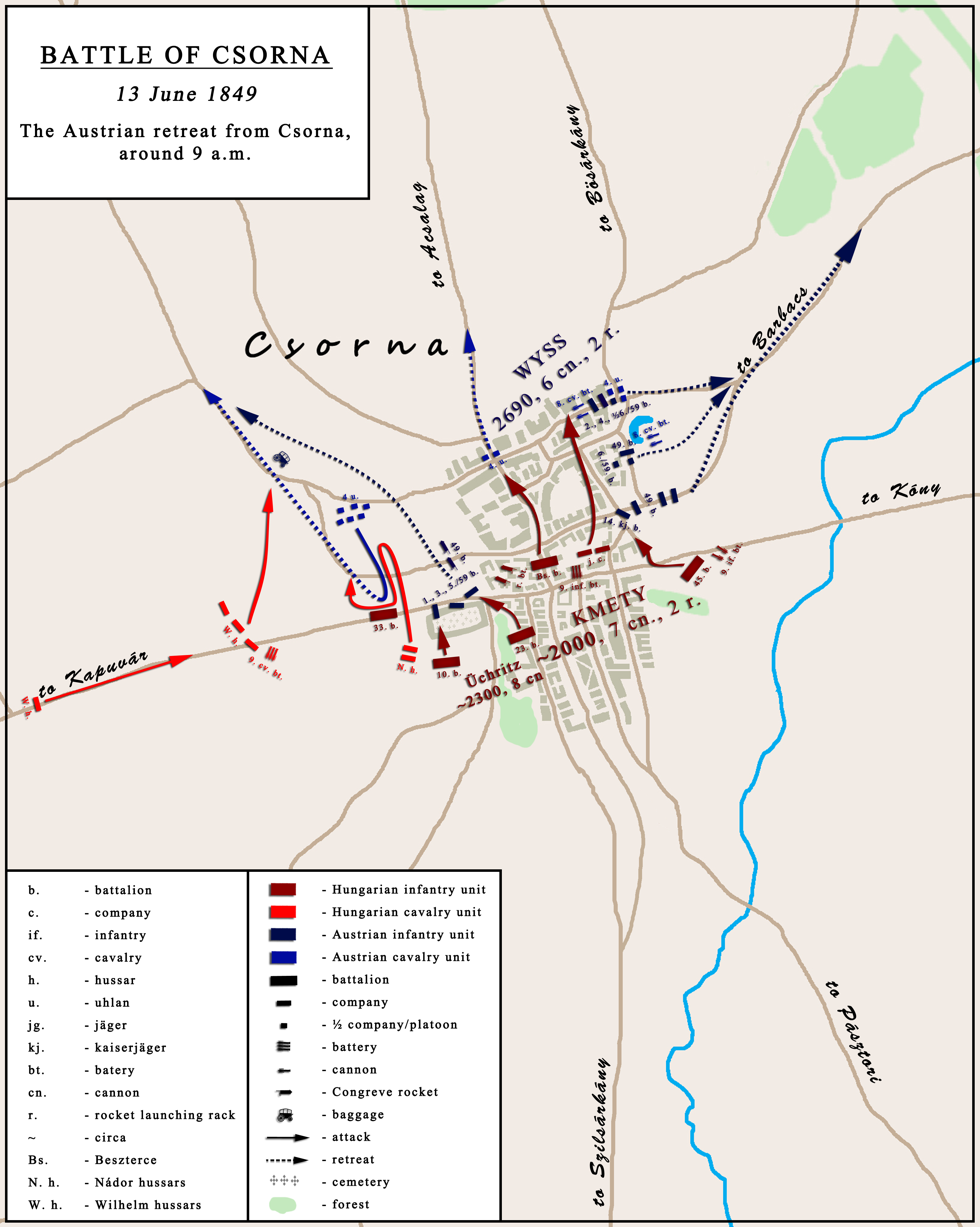
Battle of Csorna (13 June 1849). The situation around 9ː00 a.m. The Austrians retreat from the city. Wyss is killed

The Austrian reports tell us that the Hungarian soldiers were helped by the inhabitants of Csorna, who participated in the battle with scythes and rifles.

After the retreat from Csorna, the 6 companies of infantry, 3 uhlan platoons, and 2 cannons stopped at Bősárkány, because they heard gunshots from the direction of Kóny. Bujanovics sent 2 platoons of uhlans towards Kóny, while the rest of the troops prepared to defend themselves at Bősárkány.

Meanwhile, at the end of the battle, the Austrian commander Major General Franz Wyss died in Csorna. The accounts about his death are many but contradictory. According to an anonymous Hungarian account, Wyss was shot dead by a Honvéd soldier. According to Colonel Zámbelly he was shot by a Hungarian officer. Another Hungarian account say that Wyss was shot by a 14 years old Hungarian Jäger, who lost his company, and wandering in Csorna trying to find his unit he stumbled upon Wyss and his suite, shooting him dead, then the Austrian officers from Wyss's staff avenged their commander by killing the young Hungarian soldier.

But the Austrian accounts do not tell nothing about this. It seems that Wyss was alone when he was killed. The Austrian accounts are more contradictory than the Hungarian ones. Some say that he was shot in his chest near a manor, then hussars and Hungarian honvéds attacked and killed him. Another Austrian account say that Wyss was attacked and killed by Hungarian peasants, who wanted to steal his horse. Others say that he was shot dead by four soldiers at the graveyard chapel. Lieutenant Bujanovics, based on "later news" said that Wyss went near the Hungarian infantry, and was killed by them with 3 bullets. A report from a day after the battle, recognizes that do not know anything precise about their commanders death, and they suspect that Wyss was wounded and captured by the Hungarians. So the conclusion is that there is uncertainty about Wyss's death, but probably he was shot dead at the end of the battle in Csorna, when the majority of his troops were already retreated from the town.

The battle was already over when the Hussar squadron that had rescued the captured Honvéds returned to the division, and under Kmety's personal command, with half of the 9th cavalry battery, they took over the pursuit of the enemy's main force. However, soon returned to Csorna due to the horses fatigue.

=== Military actions outside of Csorna, but related to the battle ===
On 13 June like half of Wyss's brigade was outside of Csorna, guarding other villages and small towns in the region. On the same day in these places too some important clashes occurred between the units of the two sides.

About an hour after the arrival of Castelnau's column in Bősárkány, the detachment led by Captain Varicourt, which stationed near the embankment from Kóny, arrived in the village. This happened because there was an additional episode of the battle. At Kmety's request - and possibly on his own initiative - Colonel Lajos Zámbelly, the Chief of Staff VII Corps', after 6:00 a.m., hearing the cannons shootings from Csorna, rode to Lesvár. He took with him the 3 hussar platoons and 3 guns that he found there, s and set off for Kóny. At the same time he sent a request for two more companies of hussars and three guns from the reserve. At Kóny, he ran into a detachment of one company of 49. (Hess) infantry regiment and ½ a company of the imperial uhlans, and two guns led by Captain Varicourt. Varicourt, who was stationed at Bágyog with his detachment, heard the shelling himself, and tried to get news from Csorna by sending couriers, but they did not return. So he headed to the station on the Győr road. 10 minutes after had he arrived, a column of Hungarian hussars, Zámbelly's detachment, was pushing forward on the Kóny embankment.

Varicourt ordered the bridge to be dismantled, but they had to abandon it because of the Hungarian gunfire. The two guns of the detachment, now consisting of 2 infantry companies and 3 platoons of uhlans (according to Zámbelly's report 500 infantrymen, 50 uhlans and 2 cannons), returned fire, but without any result. A quarter of an hour later Varicourt saw another Hungarian column approaching from Bágyog, and received a message that the Hungarians had taken Csorna. He then immediately ordered the retreat, but before Barbacs again deployed the 3 uhlan platoons and the 2 guns.

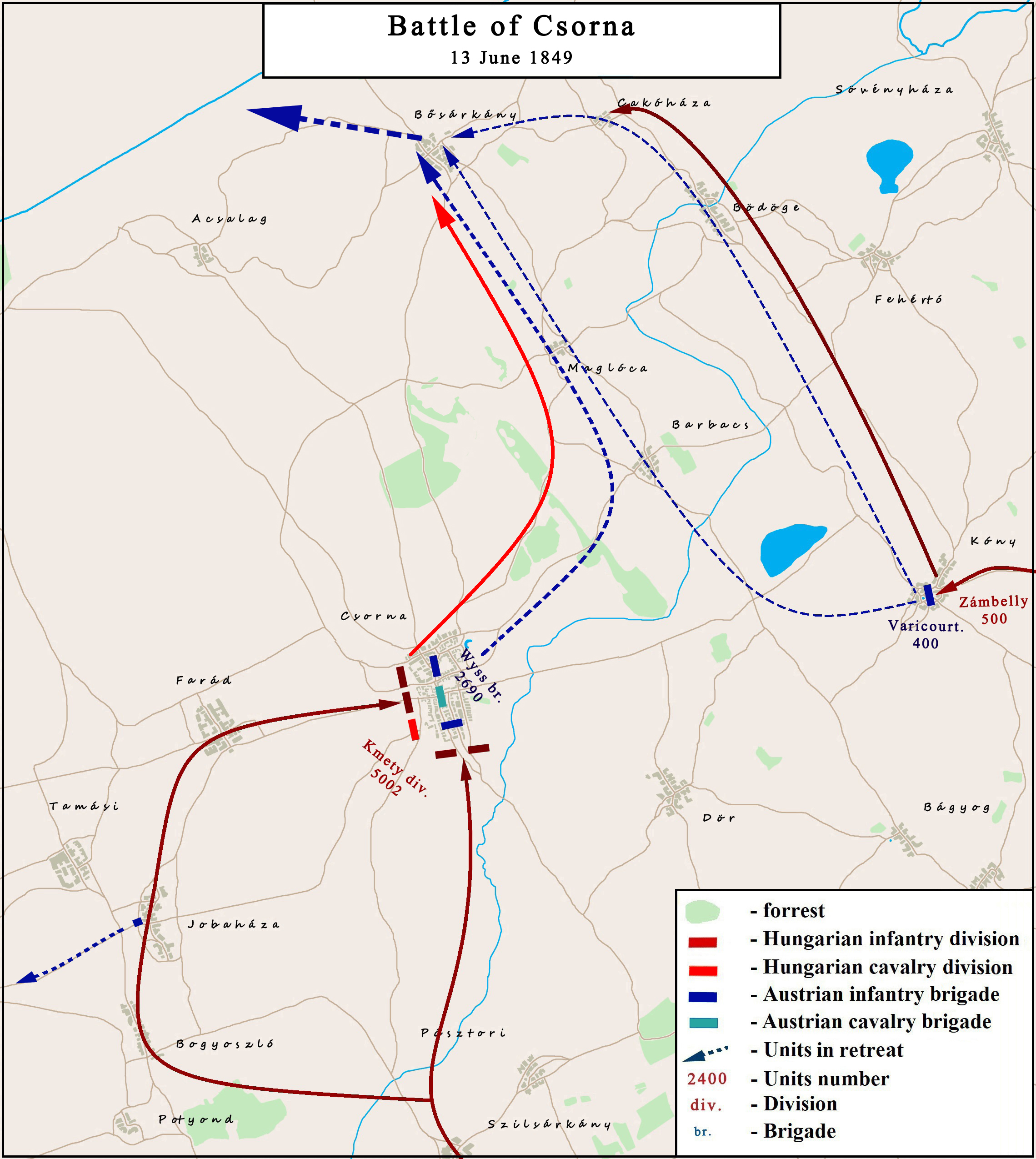
The military actions of the Hungarian troops during and after the Battle of Csorna, around the town.jpg

Meanwhile, Zámbelly crossed the bridge, and soon arrived the 2 hussar companies and 3 cannons from the reserve, which he then sent to Markota, to cut the Austrians retreat rout. He himself continued his pursuit of Varicourt, but the detachment sent towards Bősárkány could not continue its way, because they found the bridge from Cakóháza dismantled by the enemy so they could not effectively disrupt the retreat of the Austrians retreating in from Csorna. Zámbelly pursued Varicourt's detachment as far as Maglóca, which meanwhile was joined by a platoon of uhlans. At Maglóca he handed over the command to a captain, telling him to follow the enemy slowly, hoping that they will not reach Bősárkány before the Hungarian detachment sent to encircle them. However, the captain effectively stopped the enemy's pursuit, so the detachment of Varincourt reached Bősárkány unhindered. At the same time, Lieutenant-General Franz Schlik, commander of the I Corps, arrived in Bősárkány, then he led the retreat himself. He ordered the troops to destroy the bridges on the embankment. The inhabitants of the village attempted to rebuild the bridge in order to help the pursuing Hungarians to capture the retreating Austrians, whereupon the Austrian troops captured three peasants and a woman; trialed, and after a summary judgment and executed other 3 by shooting, and killed with sword another one. Enraged by the hostile behaviour of the population of Bősárkány and the actions of the guerrillas in the area, Schlik burnt the village on 21 June.

Why did the Austrian units stationed in other localities nearby Csorna, not intervened in the battle? On the morning of 13 June, 90 imperial uhlans, 4 companies of Schönhals infantry, 4 companies of Lika border guards and 3 artillery pieces were stationed in Kapuvár under the command of Major Bombelles. Major Kahlert was in Mihályi with two companies of Lika border guards, two companies of Schönhals infantrymen and one company of imperial uhlans, who had arrived the night before as replacements for the fatigued troops. At dawn, the uhlans sent a reconnaissance patrol to Sebes, Marcal and Szany. The patrol, however, returned with the report that "they spotted an enemy column at Szany marching towards Szil, and they are followed by cavalry". The patrol also captured two honvéds, who said that during the night 11,000 Hungarians had marched with four squadrons of hussars towards Csorna. Kahlert reported this to Major Bombelles. Bombelles himself sent patrols towards Mihályi and Babót during the night, but they did not detect anything. At half past five in the morning, he heard gunfire from Csorna, and the report of his patrol sent at 4:00 a.m. arrived at the same time, reporting about the Hungarian attack against Csorna. Bombelles then left a company of the Schönhals infantry with one gun behind to cover Kapuvár, and he himself with 3 companies of the Schönhals, 3 platoons of uhlans and 2 guns pushed through Babót towards Jobbaháza. When he was heading to Jobbahágya, he learned from one of his patrols, that the Hungarians took Csorna, and the half brigade of Wyss retreated to Bősárkány. Bombelles then returned to Kapuvár, and at 4 p.m. evacuated the settlement and took up a position in Vitnyéd. Colonel Schneider, delegated to investigate the conduct, during the battle, of Bombelles considered his retreat justified, saying that it would have been useless to advance further, and that, if he continued his march, the enemy could easily have surrounded his troops.

On the day of the battle Major General Collery was at Szerdahely with a brigade of the Austrian III. corps. He received news of the Hungarian attack against Csorna only at 9:30 a.m. from Bombelles, but this time the battle was already over. Collery reported this to the commandement of the III. corps, and he was ordered to retreat towards Nagycenk, but to keep his vanguards at Fertőszentmiklós.

Days later Lieutenant Field Marshal Julius Jacob von Haynau, and Lieutenant General Franz Schlik demanded a detailed investigation, why Bombelles and Collery did not intervened in the battle of Csorna, and despite this investigation proved that they were not guilty, Haynau still removed Collery from the leadership of his brigade, putting Lieutenant General Moltke in his place.

The Hungarians, after they occupied Csorna, pushed the imperials towards the marshes of Hanság. The imperials were lucky, because some days before the Austrian sappers had restored the bridges, so they could retreat over them, without this they could have easily fallen into the Hungarian trap, and been forced to surrender. Thanks to these bridges, they reached Bősárkány with heavy losses. At the same time two other Hungarian detachments from the VII corps also won victories against Austrian troops, chasing them away from Öttevény and Kóny.

== Losses ==
At the end of the battle lost 53 dead and 218 wounded (according to other sources 33 dead and 184 wounded), while the Austrians 55 dead, 78 wounded and 125 missing and captured soldiers. Kmety in his post-battle report, writes that the Austrians had among their deads Major General Franz Wyss, one staff officer, many uhlan officers, many uhlans, and much more infantry soldiers, taking 50 prisoners, 3 of whom were officers and two medics, capturing one Congreve rocket launching rack, many weapons, equipment, horses and 50 cattle.

The Hungarian Kmety division
- 10. Royal Hungarian Honvéd battalion (450 soldiers) = 2 dead, 37 wounded (1 officer);
- 23. Honvéd battalion (720 soldiers) = 9 dead, 36 wounded;
- 33. Honvéd battalion (700 soldiers) = 6 dead, 22 wounded (1 officer);
- 45. Honvéd battalion (830 soldiers) = 9 dead, 59 wounded (3 officers);
- 2. Honvéd battalion from Beszterce (750 soldiers) = 2 dead, 21 wounded (1 officer);
- 2 companies of the 1. Jäger division (280 soldiers) = 2 dead, 13 wounded (2 officers);
- 2 companies of the 12. (Nádor) Hussar Regiment (300 hussars) = 4 dead, 10 wounded (2 officers);
- 4 companies of the 10. (Wilhelm) Hussar Regiment (623 hussars) = 17 dead (2 officers), 10 wounded;
Total: 53 dead (2 officers), 218 wounded (10 officers);

== Aftermath ==
After this success Kmety retreated with the bulk of his troops on the right bank of the Rába, leaving only a weak advance guard in Csorna.

After the battle the population of Csorna was accused of helping the Hungarian troops, some saying that some inhabitants wanted to kill the Austrian wounded soldiers. Haynau said that if its proven that the inhabitants helped the Hungarians, they should be punished to give 200 oxen. But when Haynau was informed by Colonel Schneider, that people from Csorna killed Austrian wounded soldiers, he ordered the burning of the city. On 26 June the Austrian troops led by Schneider, put fire on 3 edges of Csorna, which was partially destroyed.

Kmety's attack at Csorna caused serious confusion among the leaders of the imperial troops. Schlik proposed that the Austrian III. Corps to advance to Fertőszentmiklós. However, Lieutenant General Burits, the temporary commander of III. Corps, withdrew his troops and wanted to place them as close to the border as possible, because he taught that Kmety had 25,000 - 30,000 soldiers at Csorna, Szil, Kiscell and Marcaltő, and these could seriously put his troops in danger. But Haynau declared, correctly, that it is very unlikely that a Hungarian army so strong could be on the right (southern) bank of the Danube, and that he supports an active, aggressive conduct from his troops, who, if they were attacked, instead of retreating, should resist and, if it is possible, to counterattack, while the other troops nearby should immediately come to their rescue as soon they hear the cannon shots. Despite losing, in that period, a series of smaller battles Szered (on 9 June), Csorna, Seregakol and Aszódpuszta (on 13 June), Seregakol and Vásárút (on 14 June) and Pata and Sopornya (on 15 June), he did not lose his head. The next days prove that he was right, and his troops started to win battles (16. June Zsigárd, Sempte, Patas; 20–21 June Pered).

For this successful battle Colonel György Kmety was awarded on 27 June with the rank of General.

Kmety's attack could have had very positive results for the planned general Hungarian attack, making Haynau send troops to the right banks of the Danube, thus easing the job of the Hungarian main armies, who wanted to attack in the region of the Vág river, which was on the left bank. Haynau indeed started to group his troops on the right bank, but not for defensive reasons, but because he himself wanted to attack. So, Kmety's action resulted in a great Hungarian tactical success, but did not have more important results. Haynau penalized the imperial officers from Wyss's half brigade, whom he found to be guilty of the defeat, continuing at the same time to prepare for his attack.

The Austrians and Russians still enjoyed numerical and technical superiority. The Hungarian army corps changed leaders by bringing new Hungarian commanders, inexperienced or unsuited for their heavy tasks, in the places of the talented and experienced generals like János Damjanich, András Gáspár, and Lajos Aulich, who because of different causes had to retire, or were moved into other positions. The Governor, President Lajos Kossuth had conflicts with the commander in chief of the army and at the same time with Minister of War General Artúr Görgei. Last but not least, the news of hugely superior Russian armies entering different parts of Hungarian soil had a demoralizing effect on Hungarian soldiers. So for all those reasons, the attack of Haynau's main imperial troops over the following days and weeks started to defeat the Hungarian armies more and more, eventually forcing them to start to retreat towards Komárom.

An interesting event happened long after the battle. In August 1852, 12 officers of the Austrian imperial uhlan regiment appeared at the dungeon of Arad, where the Hungarian soldiers served their prison sentence for fighting in the Hungarian war of independence from 1848 to 1849. They asked the prisoners if there are among them hussars of the Nádor regiment, who fought at Csorna. The prisoners pointed at Gedeon Virágh, who led the 2 companies of the regiment in the battle of Csorna. When the former Hungarian officer asked them what they want. They told him that they are from the Imperial Uhlan Regiment, with which the Nádor Hussars fought in the battle of Csorna, and until then, they fought battles in Italy, where they won every of their engagements, and only the Hussars led by Virágh defeated them at Csorna. And now they shaked his hand and congratulated him.

== Sources ==
- Babucs, Zoltán (2020), "A csornai ütközet", Magyarságkutató Intézet (in Hungarian), archived from the original on 30 October 2022
- Bóna, Gábor (1987). Tábornokok és törzstisztek a szabadságharcban 1848–49 ("Generals and Staff Officers in the War of Freedom 1848–1849") (in Hungarian). Budapest: Zrínyi Katonai Kiadó. p. 430. ISBN 963-326-343-3.
- Hermann, Róbert, ed. (1999). A csornai ütközet története és okmánytára ("The history of the Battle of Csorna and its documents) (in Hungarian). Győr: The Archives of Győr-Moson-Sopron County. p. 310. ISBN 963-8218-20-7.
- Hermann, Róbert, ed. (1996). Az 1848–1849 évi forradalom és szabadságharc története ("The history of the Hungarian Revolution and War of Independence of 1848–1849) (in Hungarian). Budapest: Videopont. p. 464. ISBN 963-8327-15-4.
- Hermann, Róbert (2004). Az 1848–1849-es szabadságharc nagy csatái ("Great battles of the Hungarian Revolution of 1848–1849") (in Hungarian). Budapest: Zrínyi. p. 408. ISBN 963-327-367-6.
- Hermann, Róbert (2001). Az 1848–1849-es szabadságharc hadtörténete ("Military History of the Hungarian Revolution of 1848–1849") (in Hungarian). Budapest: Korona Kiadó. p. 424. ISBN 963-9376-21-3.
- Markó, Árpád (1960), "A csornai ütközet" (PDF), Hadtörténelmi Közlemények 1960 (volume 7, nr. 1) (in Hungarian)
- Pusztaszeri, László (1984). Görgey Artúr a szabadságharcban ("Artúr Görgey in the War of Independence") (in Hungarian). Budapest: Magvető Könyvkiadó. p. 784. ISBN 963-14-0194-4.
