= Csapod =

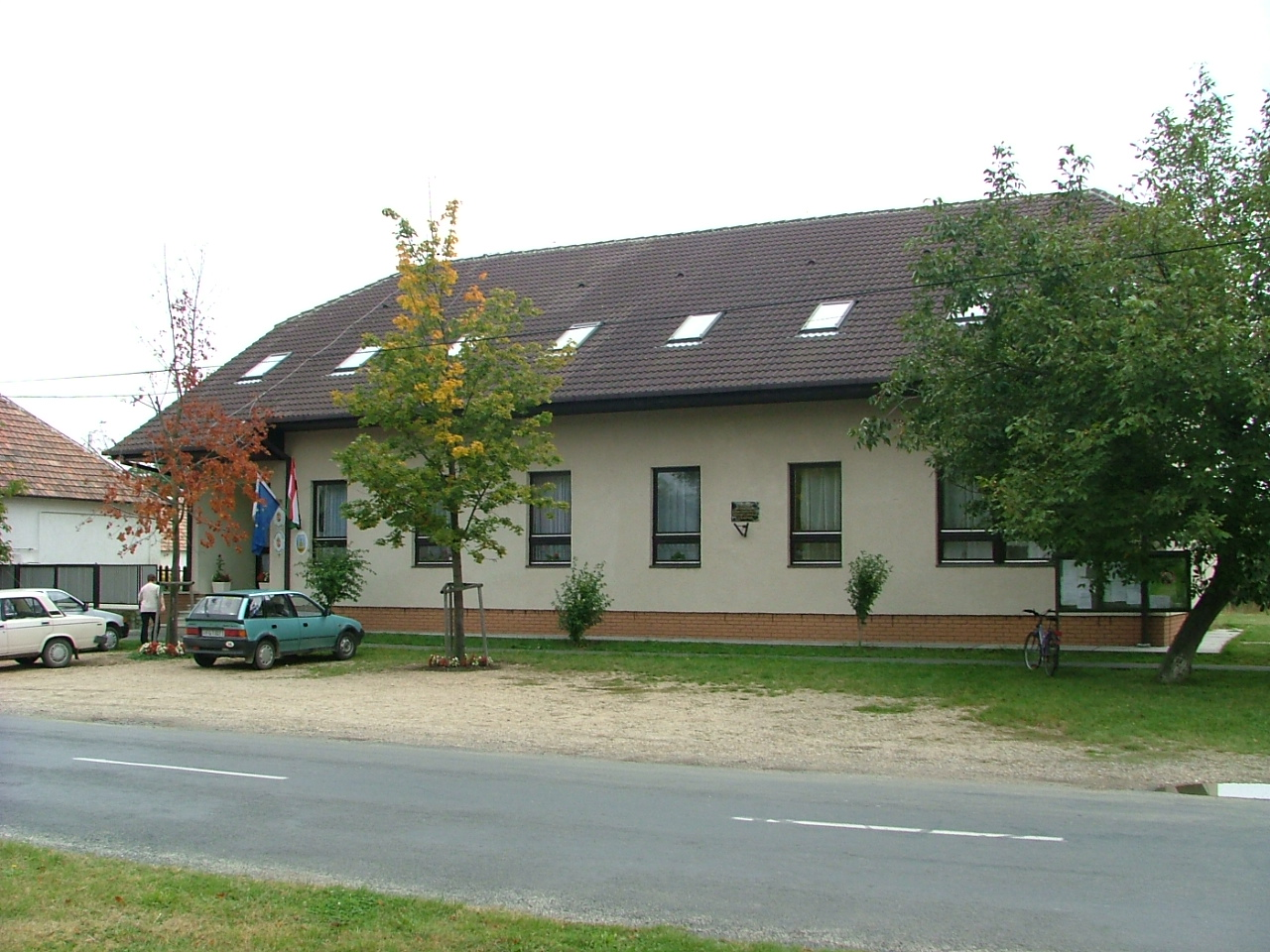
- Village hall

- Coat of arms

- Location of Győr-Moson-Sopron county in Hungary

- Location of Csapod
- Coordinates: 47.51605°N 16.92556°E
- Country: Hungary
- County: Győr-Moson-Sopron

Area
  - Total: 29.19 km^{2} (11.27 sq mi)

Population (2004)
  - Total: 567
  - Density: 19.42/km^{2} (50.3/sq mi)
- Time zone: UTC+1 (CET)
  - Summer (DST): UTC+2 (CEST)
- Postal code: 9372
- Area code: 99

Csapod is a village in Győr-Moson-Sopron county, Hungary.
