= Románd =

- Flag Coat of arms

- Location of Győr-Moson-Sopron county in Hungary

- Location of Románd
- Coordinates: 47.44839°N 17.79108°E
- Country: Hungary
- County: Győr-Moson-Sopron

Area
  - Total: 9.85 km^{2} (3.80 sq mi)

Population (2004)
  - Total: 324
  - Density: 32.89/km^{2} (85.2/sq mi)
- Time zone: UTC+1 (CET)
  - Summer (DST): UTC+2 (CEST)
- Postal code: 8434
- Area code: 88

Románd is a village in Győr-Moson-Sopron county, Hungary.
