= Vitnyéd =

- Flag Coat of arms

- Location of Vitnyéd
- Coordinates: 47.5833°N 16.9833°E
- Country: Hungary
- County: Győr-Moson-Sopron

Government
  - Mayor: Szalai Csaba József (Ind.)

Area
  - Total: 32.25 km^{2} (12.45 sq mi)

Population (2022)
  - Total: 1,425
  - Density: 44.19/km^{2} (114.4/sq mi)
- Time zone: UTC+1 (CET)
  - Summer (DST): UTC+2 (CEST)
- Postal code: 9371
- Area code: 96
- Website: http://vitnyed.hu

Vitnyéd is a village in Győr-Moson-Sopron County, Hungary.

In 2024 Vitnyéd became the location of a dispute between Austria and Hungary over the nature of a planned refugee camp.
