= Trhová Hradská =

Trhová Hradská Vásárút
- Municipality
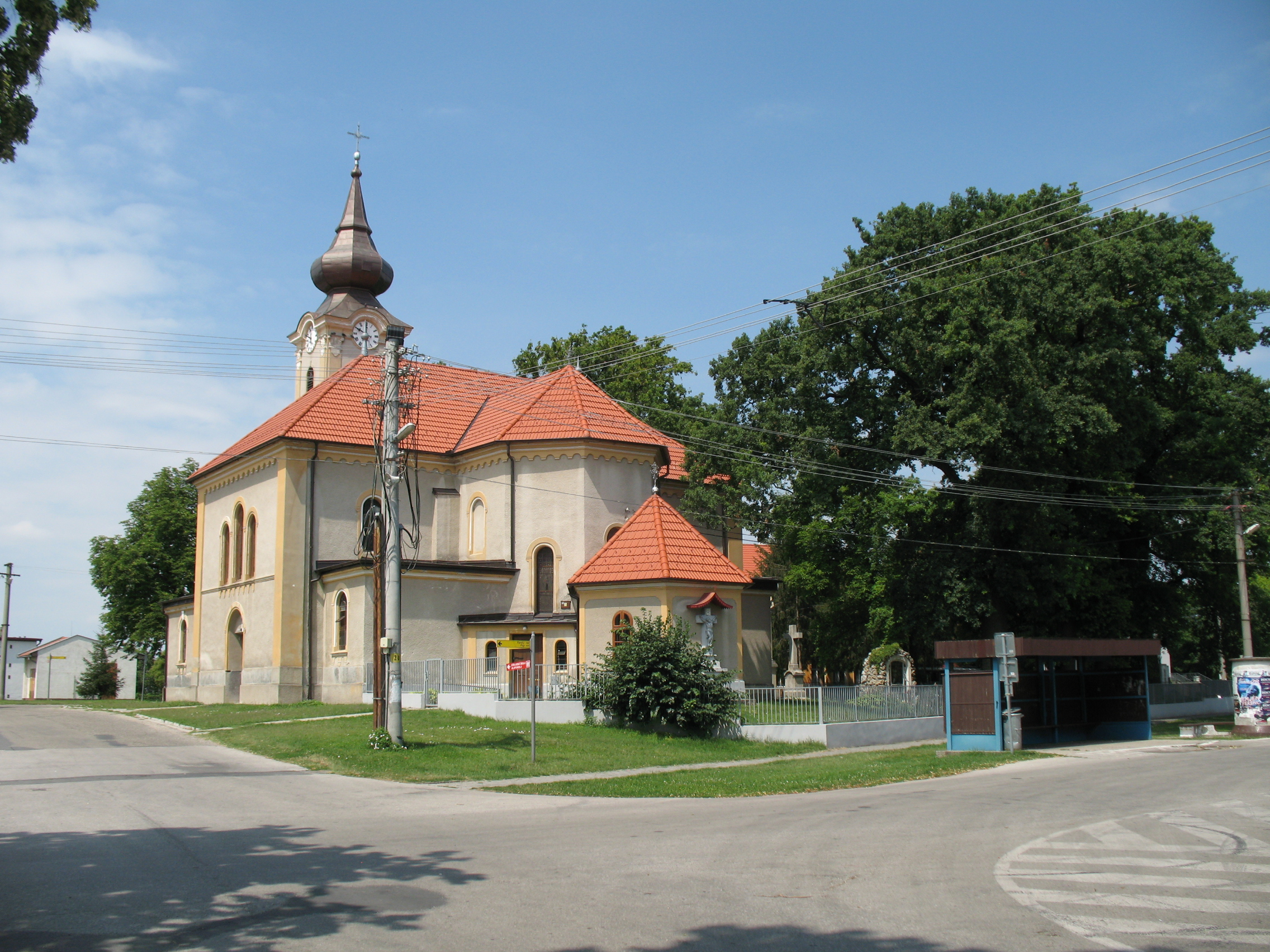

- Flag

- Location of Trhová Hradská in the Trnava Region Location of Trhová Hradská in Slovakia
- Coordinates: 47.99°N 17.75°E
- Country: Slovakia
- Region: Trnava Region
- District: Dunajská Streda District
- First mentioned: 1245

Government
  - Mayor: Roland Zsoldos (Ind.)

Area
  - Total: 24.75 km^{2} (9.56 sq mi)
- Elevation: 112 m (367 ft)

Population (2025)
  - Total: 2,153

Ethnicity
  - Hungarians: 94,64 %
  - Slovaks: 3,86 %
- Time zone: UTC+1 (CET)
  - Summer (DST): UTC+2 (CEST)
- Postal code: 930 13
- Area code: +421 31
- Vehicle registration plate (until 2022): DS
- Website: www.trhovahradska.sk

Trhová Hradská (Hungarian: Vásárút, pronounced [ˈvaːʃaːruːt], lit. 'Marketroad') is a village and municipality in the Dunajská Streda District in the Trnava Region of south-west Slovakia.

== History ==
In the 9th century, the territory of Trhová Hradská became part of the Kingdom of Hungary. The village was first recorded in 1235 by its Hungarian name as "Vasarut". Until the end of World War I, it was part of Hungary and fell within the Dunaszerdahely district of Pozsony County. After the Austro-Hungarian army disintegrated in November 1918, Czechoslovak troops occupied the area. After the Treaty of Trianon of 1920, the village became officially part of Czechoslovakia. In November 1938, the First Vienna Award granted the area to Hungary and it was held by Hungary until 1945. After Soviet occupation in 1945, Czechoslovak administration returned and the village became officially part of Czechoslovakia in 1947.

== Geography ==
The municipality lies at an altitude of 112 metres (367 ft) and covers an area of 24.75 km^{2} (9.56 sq mi) (2025).

== Population ==
Population statistic (10 years)
Year	1995	2005	2015	2025
Count	2068	2210	2170	2153
Difference		+6.86%	−1.80%	−0.78%

Population statistic
Year	2024	2025
Count	2160	2153
Difference		−0.32%

It has a population of 2153 people (31 December 2025).

=== Ethnicity ===
Census 2021 (1+ %)
Ethnicity	Number	Fraction
Hungarian	1931	87.33%
Slovak	277	12.52%
Not found out	104	4.7%
Romani	39	1.76%
Total	2211	

In year 2021 was 2211 people by ethnicity 1931 as Hungarian, 277 as Slovak, 104 as Not found out, 39 as Romani, 6 as Other, 4 as Vietnamese, 3 as Ukrainian, 2 as Czech, 1 as Serbian, 1 as Romanian, 1 as Moravian and 1 as English.

Note on population: The difference values of population numbers in the table "Population statistic" and in the sections "Ethnicity" & "Religion" is caused by the use of various statistical methods.

=== Religion ===
Census 2021 (1+ %)
Religion	Number	Fraction
Roman Catholic Church	1677	75.85%
None	378	17.1%
Not found out	62	2.8%
Calvinist Church	52	2.35%
Total	2211	

In year 2021 was 2211 people by religion 1677 from Roman Catholic Church, 378 from None, 62 from Not found out, 52 from Calvinist Church, 13 from Evangelical Church, 10 from Christian Congregations in Slovakia, 7 from Jehovah's Witnesses, 7 from Greek Catholic Church, 1 from Eastern Orthodox Church, 1 from Paganism and natural spirituality, 1 from Other and not ascertained christian church, 1 from United Methodist Church and 1 from Buddhism.

In 1910, the village had 1337, for the most part, Hungarian inhabitants. At the 2001 Census the recorded population of the village was 2125 while an end-2008 estimate by the Statistical Office had the villages's population as 2254. As of 2001, 94,64 per cent of its population was Hungarian while 3,86 per cent was Slovak. Roman Catholicism is the majority religion of the village, its adherents numbering 90.40% of the total population.

== Twinnings ==
The village is twinned with:

- Bőny, Hungary
