= Pataš =

Pataš Csilizpatas
- Municipality
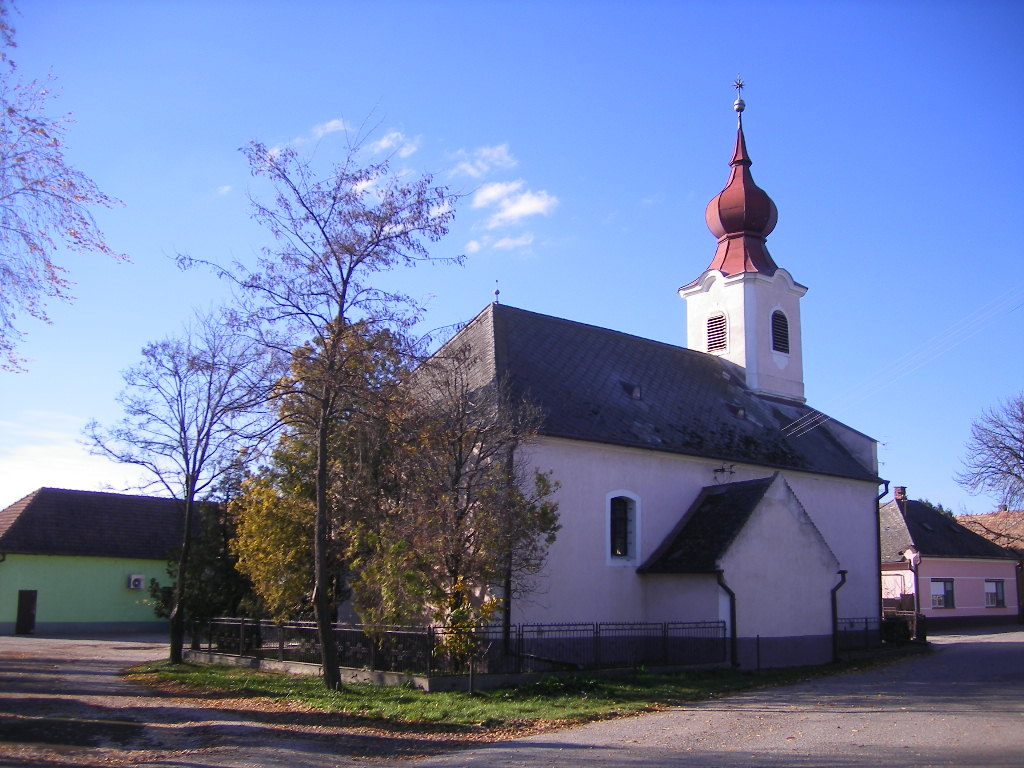

- Flag Coat of arms

- Location of Pataš in the Trnava Region Location of Pataš in Slovakia
- Coordinates: 47.88°N 17.65°E
- Country: Slovakia
- Region: Trnava Region
- District: Dunajská Streda District
- First mentioned: 1270

Government
  - Mayor: Lajos Kiss (Party of the Hungarian Coalition)

Area
  - Total: 9.38 km^{2} (3.62 sq mi)
- Elevation: 112 m (367 ft)

Population (2025)
  - Total: 830

Ethnicity
  - Hungarians: 89.69%
  - Slovaks: 7.45%
- Time zone: UTC+1 (CET)
  - Summer (DST): UTC+2 (CEST)
- Postal code: 929 01
- Area code: +421 31
- Vehicle registration plate (until 2022): DS
- Website: www.obecpatas.sk

Pataš (Hungarian: Csilizpatas, pronounced [ˈtʃilizpɒtɒʃ]) is a village and municipality in the Dunajská Streda District in the Trnava Region of south-west Slovakia. The municipality also comprises Milinovice (Hungarian: Milénium) and Pásztómajor settlements. Between 1948 and 1991, the Slovak name of the village was Pastúchy.

The local agricultural co-operative survived the transition from communism to market-economy and is now one of the largest companies of the area.

== Geography ==
The municipality lies at an altitude of 112 metres (367 ft) and covers an area of 9.38 km^{2} (3.62 sq mi) (2025).

== History ==
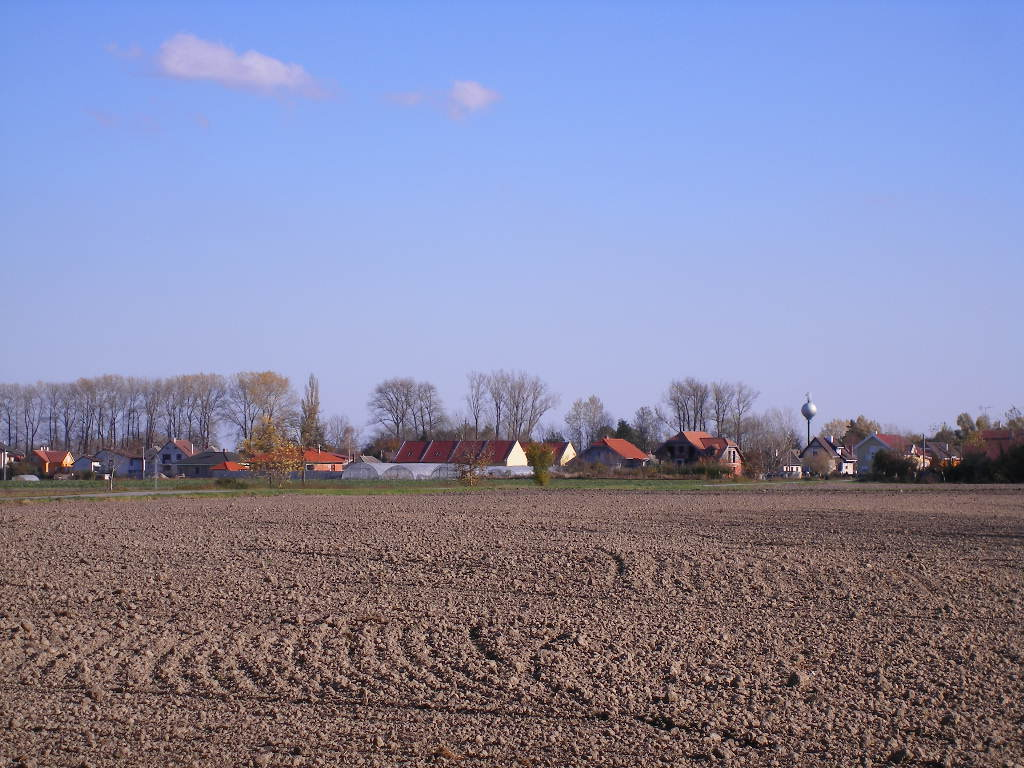
View of the village

The village was first recorded in 1268. For three centuries, the village had been possession of the Dominican convent on the Margaret Island but Gabriel Bethlen prince of Transylvania confiscated it in 1621.

On its outer area, there used to two other villages as well, Für (Fyur) and Zelebeg, destroyed during the Ottoman–Hungarian Wars. Until the end of World War I, it was part of Hungary and fell within the Tószigetcsilizköz district of Győr County. After the Austro-Hungarian army disintegrated in November 1918, Czechoslovak troops occupied the area. After the Treaty of Trianon of 1920, the village became officially part of Czechoslovakia. In 1923, as part of the Slovakization, 49 colonist families, mostly from Moravia, were settled into the village. In November 1938, the First Vienna Award granted the area to Hungary and it was held by Hungary until 1945. After the Soviet occupation in 1945, Czechoslovak administration returned and the village became officially part of Czechoslovakia in 1947.

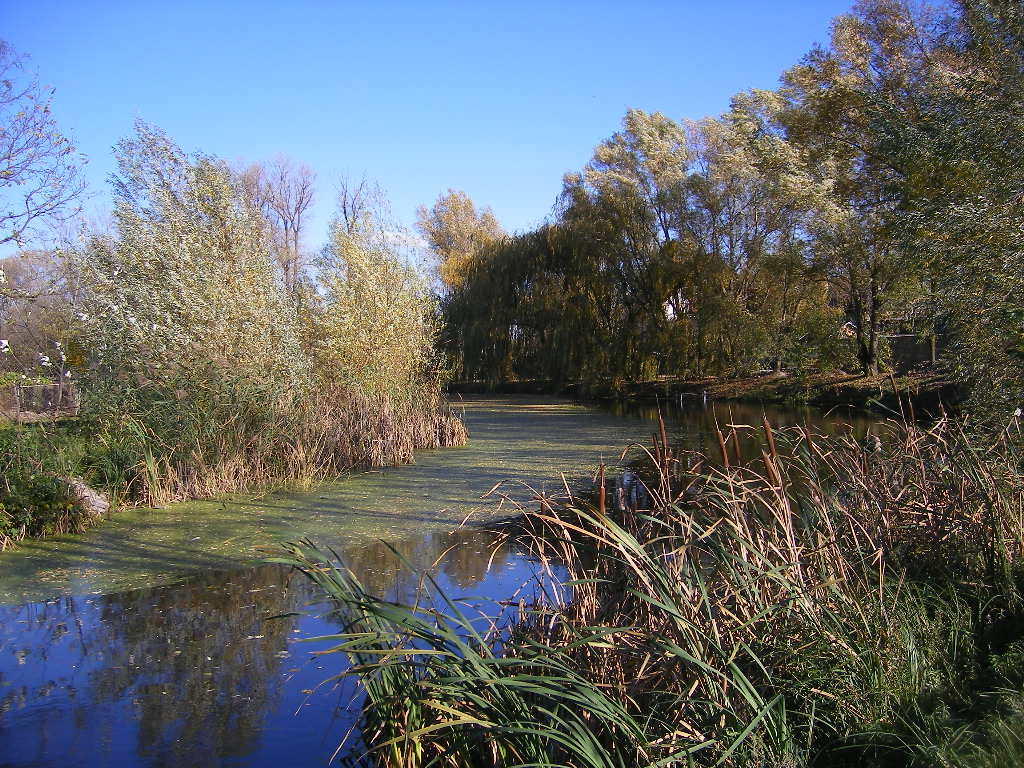
The Csiliz Creek

== Population ==
Population statistic (10 years)
Year	1995	2005	2015	2025
Count	785	830	803	830
Difference		+5.73%	−3.25%	+3.36%

Population statistic
Year	2024	2025
Count	833	830
Difference		−0.36%

It has a population of 830 people (31 December 2025).

=== Ethnicity ===
Census 2021 (1+%)
Ethnicity	Number	Fraction
Hungarian	660	81.68%
Slovak	135	16.7%
Romani	31	3.83%
Not found out	25	3.09%
Total	808	

In year 2021 was 808 people by ethnicity 660 as Hungarian, 135 as Slovak, 31 as Romani, 25 as Not found out, 2 as Czech, 2 as Moravian, 2 as Other and 1 as Romanian.

Note on population: The difference values of population numbers in the table "Population statistic" and in the sections "Ethnicity" & "Religion" is caused by the use of various statistical methods.

=== Religion ===
Census 2021 (1+%)
Religion	Number	Fraction
Calvinist Church	335	41.46%
Roman Catholic Church	307	38%
None	123	15.22%
Evangelical Church	21	2.6%
Not found out	14	1.73%
Total	808	

In year 2021 was 808 people by religion 335 from Calvinist Church, 307 from Roman Catholic Church, 123 from None, 21 from Evangelical Church, 14 from Not found out, 3 from Christian Congregations in Slovakia, 2 from Greek Catholic Church, 1 from Other and not ascertained christian church, 1 from Other and 1 from United Methodist Church.

In 1910, the village had 700 inhabitants, mainly Hungarians.

At the 2001 Census the recorded population of the village was 805 while an end-2008 estimate by the Statistical Office had the village's population as 869. As of 2001, 89.69% of its population were Hungarians while 7.45% were Slovaks.

As of 2001, 64.96% of the inhabitants professed Protestantism, while the adherents of Roman Catholicism numbered 25.45% of the total population.
