= Mihályi =

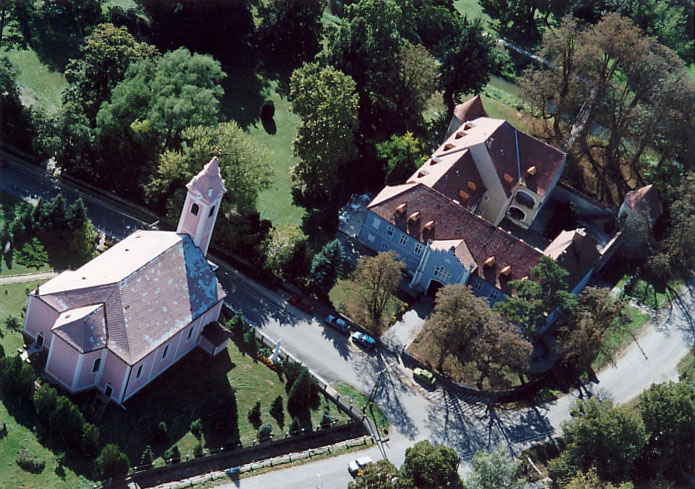
- Aerial photography of Mihályi

- Flag Coat of arms

- Location of Győr-Moson-Sopron county in Hungary

- Location of Mihályi, Hungary
- Coordinates: 47.52123°N 17.09360°E
- Country: Hungary
- County: Győr-Moson-Sopron

Area
  - Total: 16.29 km^{2} (6.29 sq mi)

Population (2004)
  - Total: 1,139
  - Density: 69.92/km^{2} (181.1/sq mi)
- Time zone: UTC+1 (CET)
  - Summer (DST): UTC+2 (CEST)
- Postal code: 9342
- Area code: 96

Mihályi is a village in Győr-Moson-Sopron county, in Hungary.
