= Győr-Moson-Sopron County 2nd constituency =

Constituency in Hungary (2012-)

Győr-Moson-Sopron County 2nd constituency (Győr)
- Constituency for the National Assembly
- Location of Győr-Moson-Sopron county 02 within Győr-Moson-Sopron county

- Location of Győr-Moson-Sopron county within Hungary
- County: Győr-Moson-Sopron
- Electorate: 71,418 (2018)
- Major settlements: Győr

Current constituency
- Created: 2011; 15 years ago
- Party: Tisza Party
- Member: András Néher
- Elected: 2026

The 2nd constituency of Győr-Moson-Sopron County (Hungarian: Győr-Moson-Sopron megyei 02. számú országgyűlési egyéni választókerület) is one of the single member constituencies of the National Assembly, the national legislature of Hungary. The constituency standard abbreviation: Győr-Moson-Sopron 02. OEVK.

Since 2026, it has been represented by András Néher of the Tisza Party.

== Geography ==
The 2nd constituency is located in eastern part of Győr-Moson-Sopron County.

=== List of municipalities ===
The constituency includes the following municipalities:

1. Bakonygyirót
2. Bakonypéterd
3. Bakonyszentlászló
4. Bőny
5. Écs
6. Felpéc
7. Fenyőfő
8. Gyömöre
9. Gönyű
10. Győr: Southern and eastern suburban part of the city.
11. Győrasszonyfa
12. Győrság
13. Győrújbarát
14. Kajárpéc
15. Lázi
16. Mezőörs
17. Nagyszentjános
18. Nyalka
19. Nyúl
20. Pannonhalma
21. Pázmándfalu
22. Pér
23. Ravazd
24. Rétalap
25. Románd
26. Sikátor
27. Sokorópátka
28. Táp
29. Tápszentmiklós
30. Tarjánpuszta
31. Tényő
32. Töltéstava
33. Szerecseny
34. Veszprémvarsány

== Members ==
The constituency was first represented by Ákos Kara of the Fidesz from 2014, and he was re-elected in 2018 and 2022. In the 2026 election, András Néher of the Tisza Party was elected representative.

| Election | Member | Party | % | Ref. |
|---|---|---|---|---|
| 2014 | Ákos Kara | Fidesz | 55.25 | |
| 2018 | Ákos Kara | Fidesz | 57.64 | |
| 2022 | Ákos Kara | Fidesz | 60.13 | |
| 2026 | András Néher | TISZA | 54.85 | |
