= Battle of Győr (1849) =

Battle of the Hungarian War of Independence of 1848–1849

Coordinates: 47°41′16.3″N 17°37′12.0″E

- Part of the Hungarian Revolution of 1848
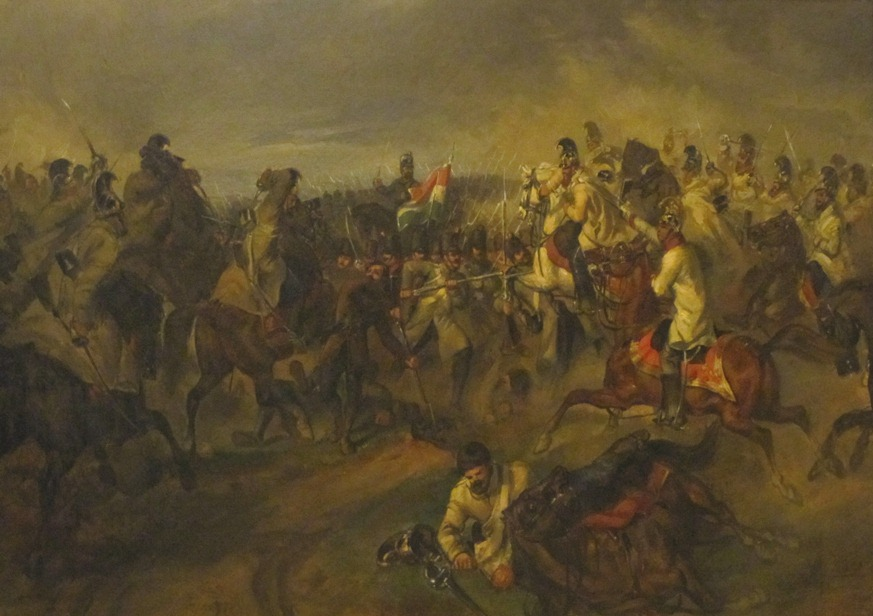
- Battle of Gyor by Johann Nepomuk Passini
Date	27–28 June 1849
Location	around and in Győr, Kingdom of Hungary
Result	Austro-Russian victory

Belligerents
Hungarian Revolutionary Army	Austrian Empire; Russian Empire

Commanders and leaders
Ernő Poeltenberg; Artúr Görgei; György Kmety	Julius Jacob von Haynau; Ludwig von Wohlgemuth; Feodor Sergeyevich Panyutyin

Strength
Total: 12,380 men: 7th Corps: 10,566 men; 46 cannons; Detached units of the 8th Corps: 1,832 men; 4 cannons; Did not participate: Kmety division: 5,492 men; 17 cannons; 2nd Corps: 5,925 men; 37 cannons	Total: 64,448 men: 1st Corps: 18,523; 3rd Corps: 17,165; 4th (reserve) Corps: 15,549; Cavalry division: 4,254; Panyutyin division: 11,672; Other units: 2,187 men; 270 cannons; Did not participate: Gerstner brigade: 4,902 men; 6 cannons

Casualties and losses
Total: 479 men: 33 dead; 73 wounded; 373 missing; 112 horses dead; 3 cannons	Total: 131 men: 16 dead; 50 wounded; 65 missing

The Battle of Raab took place during the Summer Campaign of the Hungarian War of Independence. It was fought on 28 June 1849 in the city of Raab, Hungary (now known as Győr). The Hungarian Revolutionary Army was led by General Ernő Poeltenberg and General Artúr Görgei. The Austrian Empire was led by Julius Jacob von Haynau, with assistance from a Russian division led by Feodor Sergeyevich Panyutyin.

After the Battle of Pered, Haynau's army, joined by the Habsburg emperor Franz Joseph I of Austria, crossed the Danube to the southern bank of the river, unnoticed by the Hungarian troops. They attacked the Hungarian units placed around Győr, Árpás, Marcaltő and Ihász, (Note: In 1849 it was a farm, today is part of Marcaltő) dividing György Kmety's division from the main troops and forcing them to retreat towards Southern Hungary.

The imperials mustered greater than five times the number of Hungarian troops (69,350 imperials – 12,888 Hungarians) at the outset. Görgei was not in the city at the start of the battle, because he was in Pest, and arrived to Győr only towards the end of the battle. He led the Hungarian cavalry and Hungarian troops as they retreated from the city. After the battle, Görgei's troops retreated to the fortress of Komárom, followed by the imperials.

== Background ==
Artúr Görgei's failed offensive ended with the Hungarian defeat in the Battle of Pered on 20 and 21 June 1849. This attack was chosen at an unlucky moment, because Austrian field marshal Julius Jacob von Haynau on 19 June moved his troops from the northern banks of the Danube to the southern banks, in order to prepare to advance towards the Hungarian capitals of Pest and Buda. But he still had enough troops to deploy with around 15 000 more soldiers in the battle than Görgei, thanks to the Russian division led by Lieutenant-General Feodor Sergeyevich Panyutyin, misleading the Hungarian commander, thinking that the imperials would remain on the northern bank. After the battle Haynau continued undetected, moving his troops to the southern bank. Haynau was very different from the earlier Austrian main commanders in Hungary; unlike the over meticulous Windisch-Grätz and the overanxious Welden, he was a very determined commander, who was not deterred from fulfilling his strategical plan, by minor setbacks, like the smaller defeats from Szered (on 9 June), Csorna, Seregakol and Aszódpuszta (on 13 June), Seregakol and Vásárút (on 14 June) and Pata and Sopornya (on 15 June), giving lectures to those commanders (General Franz Schlik or Lieutenant General Johann Wilhelm Freiherr Burits von Pournay) who started to hesitate and wanted to retreat, about courage and the importance of accepting the fight. Haynau took the decision to transfer his troops from the left banks of the Danube to the right, and to advance towards Buda and Pest on 18 June, calculating that the Russian army led by Field Marshal Ivan Paskevich will come and operate on the left bank, and when he understood that the Russians are not arriving there (because of the late start of their Hungarian campaign, and their slow advance), he decided to stick to his initial plan of advancing on the right bank of the Danube towards the Hungarian capitals. On this bank of the Danube he was more able to use his numerical superiority, than on the left bank crisscrossed by many rivers, was closer to Pestbuda, and to the Austrian army of Southern Hungary led by Lieutenant General Josip Jelačić.

After the Hungarians managed to confuse themselves about Haynau's intentions, by entering with the Austrians in the Battle of Pered, after crossing the Danube on 24 June, the IV. (Reserve) took a position at Mosonmagyaróvár, the Panyutyin division at Rajka, the bulk of the I. corps at Moson, its vanguard at Öttevény, and its brigade from the left flank at Hédervár, while the different brigades of the III. corps spread in a line, across a wider area. On 26 June the Wolf brigade took a position at Árpás, the Veigl and Dossen brigades at Egyed, the Schneider (formerly Wyss) brigade took Csorna, while the Gerstner brigade from its right flank occupied Szany.

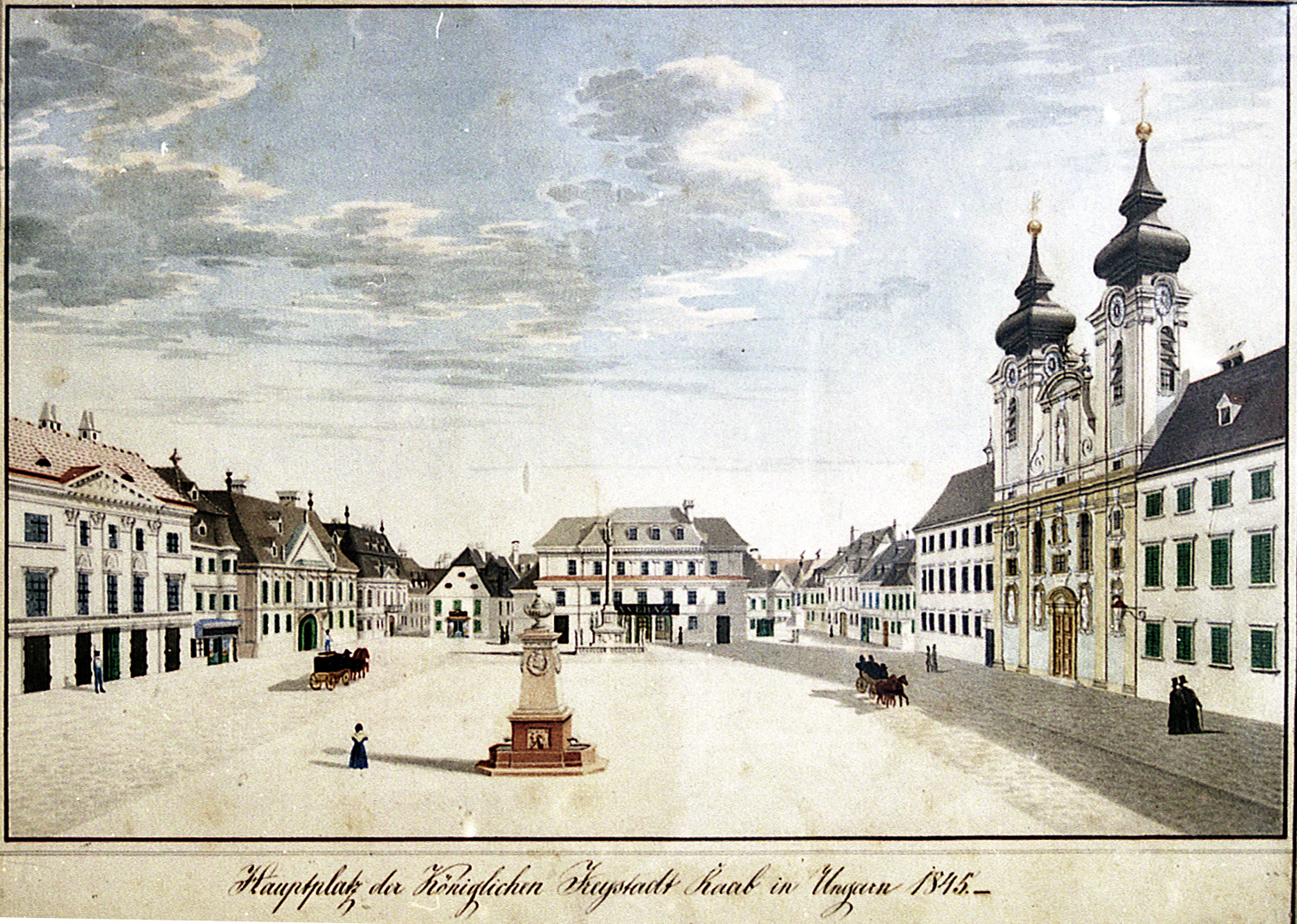
Győr by Fruhmann Antal 1845

During this time, relations between Lajos Kossuth, the governor of Hungary, the Szemere-government, and its secretary of war, Görgei, worsened, causing a conflict between the political and military leadership. This lasted until the Hungarian Surrender at Világos, disrupting the Hungarian efforts of defense. In the middle of June, Görgei openly declared that he was against the Hungarian Declaration of Independence (proclaimed on 14 April 1849), claiming that this triggered the Russians to send their troops against the Hungarian revolution. However, discussions between the Habsburg empire and the Russian Empire about the Russian intervention had started two weeks before the declaration).

After 21 June, Görgei was both the commander-in-chief of the Hungarian army and the Minister of Defence of Hungary in the Szemere-Government. He was often forced to travel between Pest and his general staff office in Tata. On 24–26 June he was in the capital, participating in a ministry council. He convinced the government to accept his plan of gathering all Hungarian forces (except of those of Transylvania and Southern Hungary) around Komárom, in order to achieve numerical superiority. He proposed to attack Haynau's troops and march against Vienna. Should that fail, he would retreat to Komárom. The cause of this desperate plan was that on 15 June Russian troops crossed Hungary's borders, entering with 193 000 soldiers and 584 cannon. This joined the 165 000 Austrian soldiers with 770 cannon against the 150 000 Hungarians and their 857 cannon (464 field cannon and 393 fortification cannon). Görgei realised that the Hungarians had no chance to win, unless they destroyed Haynau's Austrian forces before the Russian troops arrived. In the ministry council held in the evening of 26 June, despite the majority's anti-Görgei feelings, his plan was accepted. On the morning of 27 June, Görgei returned to take over the leadership of the troops, having heard about the concentration of the imperial troops near Győr. The imperials planned to encircle the Hungarian troops in Győr, forcing them to surrender. Failing that they planned to split the Kmety division from the Hungarian VII corps led by Ernő Poeltenberg, and to force them to evacuate the city.

On 16 June Kmety reported the apparition of 16,000 Austrian soldiers with 40 guns at Sopron. After this the Hungarian scouts reported day by day, more movements of the Austrian troops south to the Danube, as they crossed, by Haynau's order, the Danube, for the offensive which they planned to start soon, in the direction of Győr and Komárom. Kmety and other Hungarian commanders conducted some reconnaissance actions in that area, but they weren't able to observe the regrouping of the Austrian troops from the northern to the southern shore of the Danube.

The Battle of Pered from 20 to 21 June was the last attempt of the Hungarian army to defeat the Austrian main army under Haynau, but the intervention of the Russian division led by Lieutenant General Feodor Sergeyevich Panyutyin decided the outcome of the battle, and the Hungarians were forced to retreat in the vicinity of the fortress of Komárom. This defeat took out the initiative from the hands of the Hungarians, and now it was the Austrians, who went on the offensive. This event increased Poeltenberg's concerns about the eventual starting of an offensive toward Győr, but his scouts reported to him only contradictory information. Poeltenberg thought that the Austrian troops will receive reinforcements on 28 June, so he proposed on 24 June to the Central Operational Bureau (Központi Hadműveleti Iroda) and Klapka, that his corps and Kmety's division should attack immediately the Austrian troops around Győr before that day, but he did not receive any response. On 25 June Kmety reported to Poeltenberg that 30,000 Austrian soldiers are marching towards Győr from the direction of Sopron. Later he sent a report to both the Central Operational Bureau and Klapka, that the Austrians are planning to encircle Győr from the south, cutting the Kmety division from his troops, and the best way to prevent this is that Kmety should move with his troops from Marcaltő (where he was ordered to station by Bayer and Görgei) to Ménfő (Note: In 1849 it was a village, today is part of Győr) because here he will prevent the k.u.k. troops to cut him from the VII. corps. But in the case of an Austrian success in this matter, he will be forced to retreat from Győr, to avoid the encirclement.

== Prelude ==
On 26 June, the imperial troops attacked. Besides their overwhelming numerical superiority, they had another factor to boost their moral: the presence of the young emperor Franz Joseph I of Austria, at the Austrian headquarters at Mosonmagyaróvár. Their plan was for their III corps (the right wing of Haynau's army) to encircle the Hungarian positions from Győr. On 27 June the main body crossed at Árpás, the Gerstner brigade from Marcaltő, and the Schneider brigade from Bodonhely. The Gerstner brigade advanced to Lesháza, taking a position on the road towards Pápa, covering the advancement of the main body. The main body of the Austrian army had to advance to Pannonhalma, or, if the IV corps did not defeat the Hungarian troops from Győr, they would march towards Táplán.

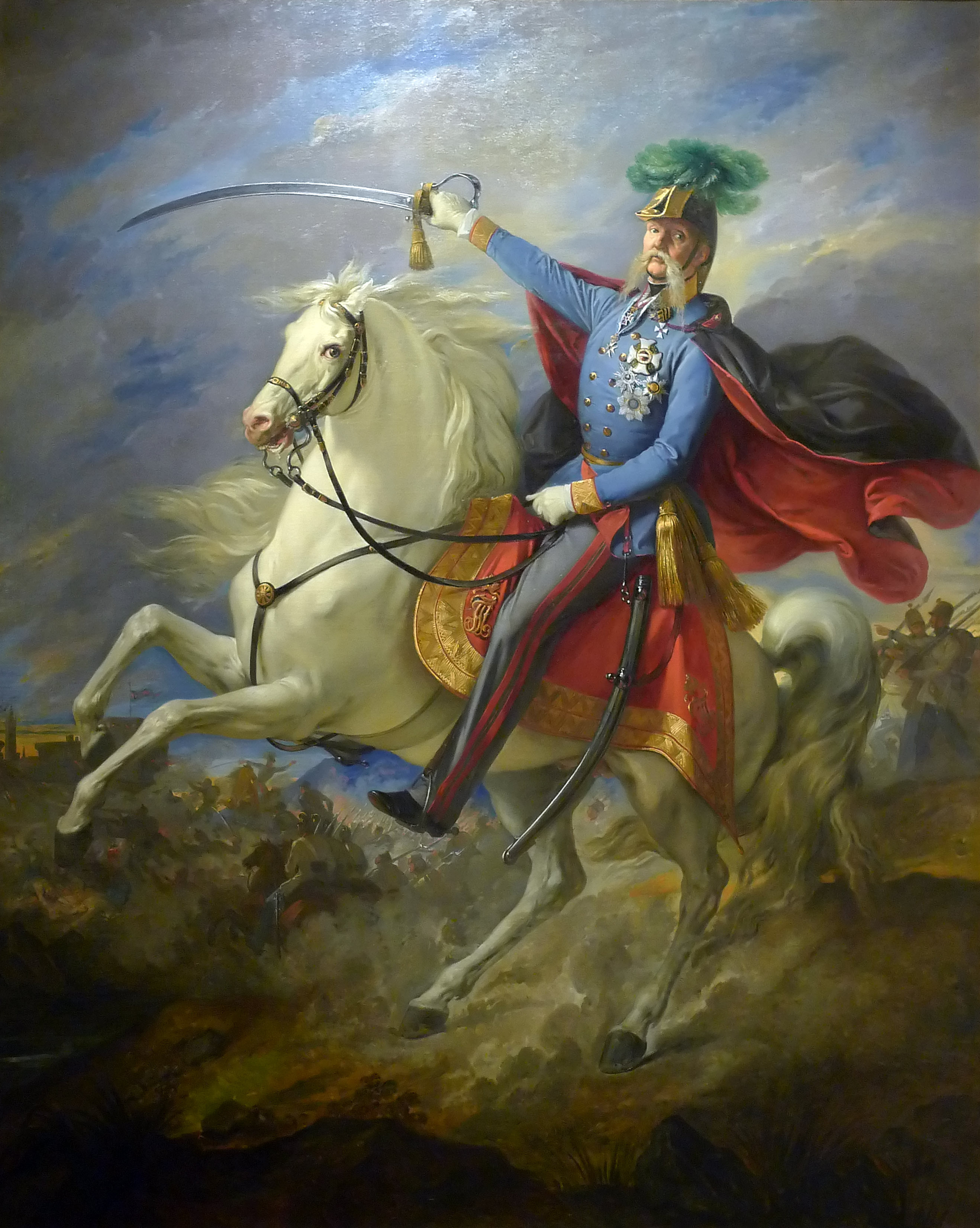
Julius von Haynau (Giuseppe Bezzoli, 1853)

On 27 June Görgei learned that the Austrian army was preparing to attack along the line of the river Rába, and during the evening he was informed that the imperials had crossed the river, cutting the Kmety division from the VII Hungarian corps. The imperials encircled the positions of the VII corps, intending a concentric attack the following day. Knowing this, Görgei departed that night towards Győr.

The IV. corps (called also the reserve corps) advanced on 27 June towards Lébény, on 28 June to cross the Rába at Rábapalota, and after uniting with the Schneider brigade to attack towards Szabadhegy. They were to be followed by the Benedek brigade and the Russian division led by Fyodor Sergeyevich Panyutyin. At the same time on 28 June the I corps attacked Abda. The II corps remained on the southern banks of the Danube, defending Csallóköz and the lower Vág region. 69 350 imperial soldiers faced 17 480 Hungarians.

According to Haynau's plan, this offensive had to fulfill several goals: to encircle the VII. corps of Poeltenberg, to occupy Győr, and to cut off the link of the VII. corps with the Kmety division.

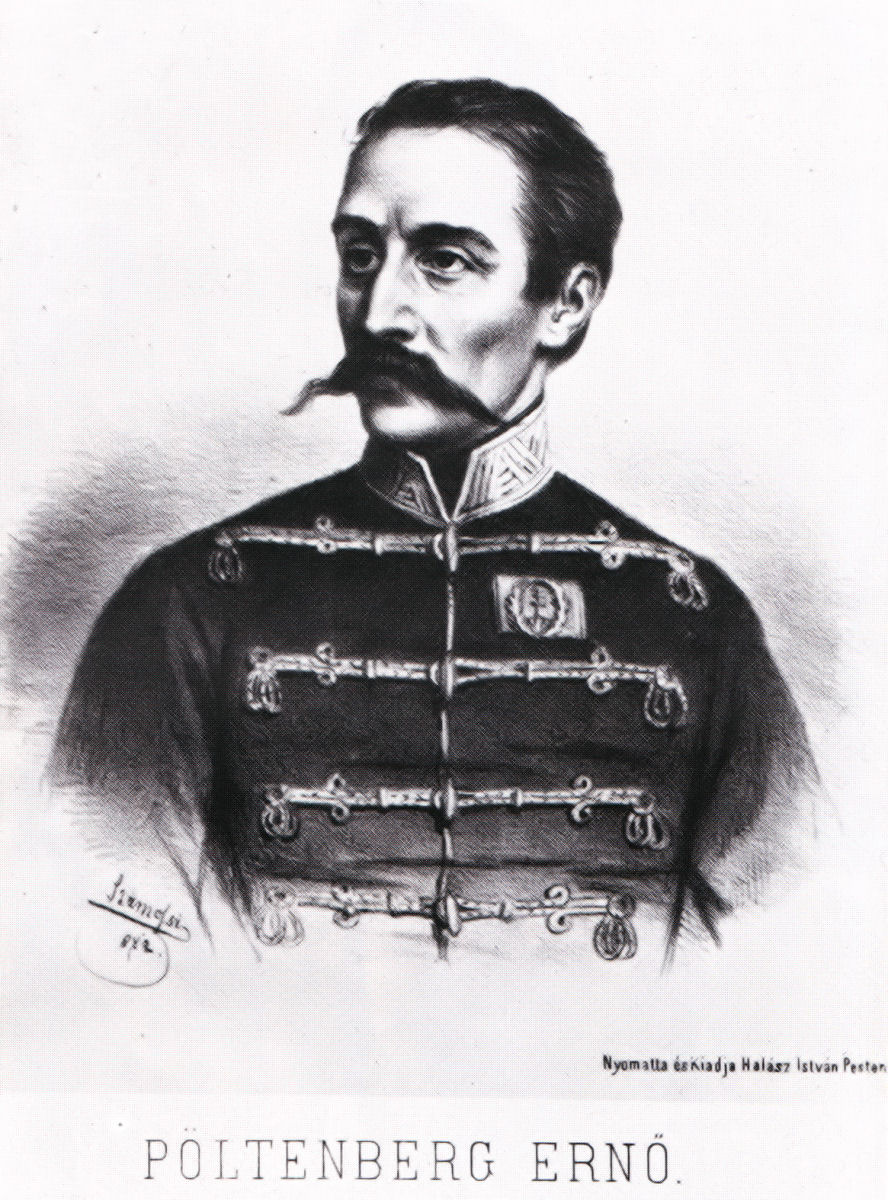
A lithograph of Ernő Poeltenberg by Elek Szamossy

Poeltenberg's goal was to hold on until he was reinforced. (None would arrive). The Hungarian Operational Office, led by Colonel József Bayer, sent the Hungarian II corps on 28 June to Gönyű, the I corps to Hull, and the III corps to Érsekújvár. On 26 June the Hungarian division led by Kmety, with his 4 530 soldiers and 15 cannon moved away from the Rába-line, retreating towards Pápa. The reason for his move was the crossing of superior imperial troops, before his reinforcements and 4000 cartridges arrived. Even if the reinforcements had arrived in time, Horváth would have had no chance against the four imperial battalions commanded by Colonel Karl Wolf von Wachentreu. The Hungarians lost 16 (according to other sources 30) soldiers during this retreat. Kmety wanted to cross the Rába at Pápoc, and to attack from behind the advancing imperials, but he needed more troops. So he waited for his battalion (which had been sent to Mórichida), but when it returned, he saw that his soldiers were too tired for another march. Instead, he was forced to retreat from Marcaltő.

On 27 June Lieutenant Colonel Hümér Kupa received the news about Kmety's retreat from the Rába line and Poeltenberg's order to take a position at Ménfő. On 28 June at 10–11, the latter decided to attack with 14 cavalry companies, 6 battalions, and 21 cannons, hoping to force them to retreat to Mórichida. General György Klapka's (2nd in charge of the main army after Görgei) chief of general staff, Mayor Péter Szillány, ordered Poeltenberg to position his troops between Ménfő, Kismegyer, and Szabadhegy, and to stop the imperial advance. Poeltenberg hoped that, during his attack at Ménfő, Kmety would prevent the imperial's southern wing to reinforce the troops he planned to attack. But on 27 June, Kmety was defeated in the Battle of Ihász, leaving Poeltenberg's left flank exposed. And when the k.u.k. III. corps advanced to Tét, Poeltenberg's left wing was tactically outflanked.

Unlike the right wing of the III. corps, represented by the Gerstner brigade, the other imperial corps occupied their pre-battle positions without any opposition.

Map of Győr and its fortifications from February 1849

Győr's defense was organized on 26 June by Poeltenberg as follows: he sent 2 battalions, 2 hussar companies, and 8 cannons in Révfalu from Csallóköz, a unit of the same composition was in front of Szigetkülváros, while Lieutenant Colonel Sándor Kossuth took a position in front of the Vienna-suburb with 2 battalions, 6 hussar companies, and 9 cannons. In the downtown remained 2 battalions and 12 cannons in reserve. In order to prevent an encirclement from the direction of Pápa, Poeltenberg sent the Liptay division with 4 infantry battalions, 8 hussar companies, and 10 cannons, to take a position, south from Győr, at Ménfő. In addition to these, the Straube brigade (2 battalions, 5 cavalry companies, 2 batteries), detached from the VII. corps, arrived on 27 June.

Győr's defense system too was reinforced by the following fortifications. On the left bank of the Rábca river, facing Abda, 2 flèches were built for 4 gun emplacements; a battery of 2 guns and several smaller outworks were installed, mostly on the western edge of the Fácán (Pheasant) Forest to defend the entrance of the Sziget (Island) Suburb; on the western bank of the Rábca, behind the bridge (which was prepared to be dismantled) from Abda, were built 4 flèches for 8 cannon emplacements. Behind these, as the main line of defense, in front of the Vienna-suburb, crossing the main road, a contiguous entrenchment earthwork, for both infantry and 12 cannons, was dug, on the left flank of which a portion of 2400 paces were left unfortified. Unfortunately, the number of Hungarian soldiers was insufficient to fill these defensive works.

=== Opposing forces ===
The Hungarian army:

VII. corps:
Commander: General Ernő Poeltenberg

- Posta infantry division: 4 line infantry battalions, 1 Hungarian jäger battalion, 13 six-pounder cannons
- Liptay infantry division: 4 Honvéd battalions, 1 Tyrolian jäger battalion, 7 six-pounder cannons
- Weissel column: 1 grenadier battalion, 1 sapper battalion, 4 Congreve rocket launching racks
- Berzsenyi cavalry division: 4. Hussar regiment, 5. company of the 9. Hussar regiment, 4 companies of the 13. Hussar regiment, 4 companies of the 16. Hussar regiment, 20 cannons.

Detached units of the VIII. corps:

- Straube brigade: 2 Honvéd battalions, 5 Hussar companies, 2 batteries.

Total: 12,380 men (67 infantry companies), 2760 horses with saddle (22 cavalry companies), 698 horses for traction, 50 cannons.

Commander in chief: General Ernő Poeltenberg;
Chief of staff: Lieutenant Colonel Ádám Járossy;
Chief of the artillery: Captain József Faváry;

Detailed order of battle of the Hungarian army

Corps	Division	Unit	Infantry company	Cavalry company	Horse	Cannon	Number
VII. Corps; General Ernő Poeltenberg	1. infantry division Lieutenant Colonel Ferenc Liptay	1. Honvéd battalion	6	-	-	-	845
VII. Corps; General Ernő Poeltenberg	1. infantry division Lieutenant Colonel Ferenc Liptay	14. Honvéd battalion	5	-	-	-	552
VII. Corps; General Ernő Poeltenberg	1. infantry division Lieutenant Colonel Ferenc Liptay	51. Honvéd battalion	6	-	-	-	649
VII. Corps; General Ernő Poeltenberg	1. infantry division Lieutenant Colonel Ferenc Liptay	66. Honvéd battalion	6	-	-	-	802
VII. Corps; General Ernő Poeltenberg	1. infantry division Lieutenant Colonel Ferenc Liptay	Tyrolian jäger battalion	4	-	-	-	683
VII. Corps; General Ernő Poeltenberg	1. infantry division Lieutenant Colonel Ferenc Liptay	11. six-pounder 1/2 in (13 mm)fantry battery	-	-	42	4	67
VII. Corps; General Ernő Poeltenberg	1. infantry division Lieutenant Colonel Ferenc Liptay	Division Total	27	-	42	4	3598
VII. Corps; General Ernő Poeltenberg	2. infantry division Lieutenant Colonel Sándor Kossuth	2. battalion of the 2. (Alexander) infantry regiment	4	-	-	-	722
VII. Corps; General Ernő Poeltenberg	2. infantry division Lieutenant Colonel Sándor Kossuth	3. battalion of the 48. (Ernest) infantry regiment	4	-	-	-	382
VII. Corps; General Ernő Poeltenberg	2. infantry division Lieutenant Colonel Sándor Kossuth	1., 4.-6. companies of the 39. Honvéd battalion	4	-	-	-	793
VII. Corps; General Ernő Poeltenberg	2. infantry division Lieutenant Colonel Sándor Kossuth	62. Honvéd battalion	6	-	-	-	622
VII. Corps; General Ernő Poeltenberg	2. infantry division Lieutenant Colonel Sándor Kossuth	Hungarian jägers	3	-	-	-	432
VII. Corps; General Ernő Poeltenberg	2. infantry division Lieutenant Colonel Sándor Kossuth	8. six-pounder infantry battery	-	-	97	6	148
VII. Corps; General Ernő Poeltenberg	2. infantry division Lieutenant Colonel Sándor Kossuth	10. six-pounder infantry battery	-	-	85	7	160
VII. Corps; General Ernő Poeltenberg	2. infantry division Lieutenant Colonel Sándor Kossuth	Division Total	21	-	182	13	3259
VII. Corps; General Ernő Poeltenberg	Cavalry division Colonel Lénárd Berzsenyi	4. (Alexander) hussar regiment	-	8	995	-	985
VII. Corps; General Ernő Poeltenberg	Cavalry division Colonel Lénárd Berzsenyi	9. (Nicholas) hussar regiment	-	5	634	-	633
VII. Corps; General Ernő Poeltenberg	Cavalry division Colonel Lénárd Berzsenyi	13. (Hunyadi) hussar regiment	-	5	566	-	555
VII. Corps; General Ernő Poeltenberg	Cavalry division Colonel Lénárd Berzsenyi	6. six-pounder cavalry battery	-	-	104	8	160
VII. Corps; General Ernő Poeltenberg	Cavalry division Colonel Lénárd Berzsenyi	7. six-pounder cavalry battery	-	-	79	5	117
VII. Corps; General Ernő Poeltenberg	Cavalry division Colonel Lénárd Berzsenyi	8. six-pounder cavalry battery	-	-	123	8	182
VII. Corps; General Ernő Poeltenberg	Cavalry division Colonel Lénárd Berzsenyi	Division Total	-	18	2501	21	2632
VII. Corps; General Ernő Poeltenberg	Reserve; Lieutenant Colonel Johann Weissl	Grenadier battalion	4	-	-	-	389
VII. Corps; General Ernő Poeltenberg	Reserve; Lieutenant Colonel Johann Weissl	1. sapper battalion	5	-	-	-	549
VII. Corps; General Ernő Poeltenberg	Reserve; Lieutenant Colonel Johann Weissl	Ammunition reserve	-	-	105	-	99
VII. Corps; General Ernő Poeltenberg	Reserve; Lieutenant Colonel Johann Weissl	2. Congreve rocket battery	-	-	19	4	32
VII. Corps; General Ernő Poeltenberg	Reserve; Lieutenant Colonel Johann Weissl	Division Total	9	-	124	4	1067
VII. Corps; General Ernő Poeltenberg	Corps total		57	18	2849	42	10,566
Detached units from the VIII. Corps; Colonel Lipót Rohonczy		46. Honvéd battalion	4	-	-	-	395
Detached units from the VIII. Corps; Colonel Lipót Rohonczy		57. Honvéd battalion	6	-	-	-	813
Detached units from the VIII. Corps; Colonel Lipót Rohonczy		16. (Károlyi) hussar regiment	-	4	565	-	582
Detached units from the VIII. Corps; Colonel Lipót Rohonczy		three-pounder half battery	-	-	43	4	42
Detached units from the VIII. Corps; Colonel Lipót Rohonczy		Division total	10	4	608	4	1832
Army total			67	22	3457	46	12,388

The Austrian Army of the Danube: High commander. Field Marshal Julius Jacob von Haynau

I. corps:
Commander: Lieutenant General Franz Schlik

- 1. (Liechtenstein) division:
  - Schneider infantry brigade: 14. half battalion, 1. battalion of the Schönhals infantry regiment, 3. battalion of the Schönhals infantry regiment, 3. battalion of the Hess infantry regiment, 1. Baden Landwehr battalion, the Schlik six-pounder battery;
  - Bianchi infantry brigade: 1 Kaiserjäger battalion, 6. jäger battalion, 1. battalion of the Polombini infantry regiment, 3. battalion of the Polombini infantry regiment, 3. battalion of the Archduke Karl infantry regiment, the combined Reischach battalion, of the Schönhals infantry regiment, 3. battalion of the Schönhals infantry regiment, 3. battalion of the Hess infantry regiment, 1. Baden Landwehr battalion, 34. six-pounder infantry battery (6 cannons);
- 2. (Wallmoden) division:
  - Reischach infantry brigade: 1. battalion of the Hartmann infantry regiment, 2. battalion of the Hartmann infantry regiment, 3. battalion of the Hartmann infantry regiment, 1. Landwehr battalion of the Parma infantry regiment, 2. Landwehr battalion of the Parma infantry regiment, 3. battalion of the Hess infantry regiment, 1. Baden Landwehr battalion, 36. six-pounder infantry battery (6 cannons);
  - Sartori infantry brigade: 2. jäger battalion, 3. battalion of the Bianchi infantry regiment, 3. battalion of the Archduke Ludwig infantry regiment, 2. battalion of the Latour infantry regiment, one-third of the 2. Ceccopieri battalion, 17. six-pounder infantry battery (6 cannons);
  - Ludwig cavalry brigade: Imperial chevau-légers regiment, Kress chevau-légers regiment, 3. cavalry battery (6 cannons);
- Artillery reserve:
  - 2 twelve-pounder batteries, 1 cavalry battery, 1 Congreve rocket battery, (24 cannons);

Total: 18,523 men (119 infantry companies), 2340 horses (16 cavalry companies), 48 cannons.

III. corps:
Commander: Lieutenant General Karl Moltke

- 1. (Schütte) infantry division:
  - Dossen brigade: 1. battalion of the Khewenhüller infantry regiment, 2. battalion of the Khewenhüller infantry regiment, 1. Landwehr battalion of the Khewenhüller infantry regiment, 3. battalion of the Wocher infantry regiment, 1. Landwehr battalion of the Wocher infantry regiment, 15 six-pounder infantry battery (6 cannons);
- 2. (Moltke) combined division:
  - Wolf infantry brigade: 22. jäger battalion, 4. Landwehr battalion of the Imperial infantry regiment, 1. Landwehr battalion of the Archdule Wilhelm infantry regiment, 1 battalion of the Ferdinand d'Este infantry regiment, 16. six-pounder infantry battery (6 cannons);
  - Veigl cavalry brigade: 8 companies of the Wrbna chevau-légers regiment, 6 companies of the Fiquelmont dragoon regiment, 11. cavalry battery (6 cannons);
- Artillery reserve:
  - 2 twelve-pounder batteries, 1 six-pounder battery, 1 Congreve rocket battery, (24 cannons);

Total: 12,263 men, 2225 horses, 42 cannons. (Note: The Gerstner brigade, which on 27 June participated in the Battle of Ihász, is not included here, because they did not participate in the battle of Győr.)

IV. (Reserve) corps:
Commander: Lieutenant General Ludwig von Wohlgemuth

- 1. (Lobkowitz) infantry division:
  - Benedek combined vanguard brigade: 12. jäger battalion, 1. battalion of the Deutschmeister infantry regiment, 2. battalion of the Deutschmeister infantry regiment, 4. battalion of the Deutschmeister infantry regiment, 1. Landwehr battalion of the Konstantin infantry regiment, 8 companies of the Archduke Karl chevau-légers regiment, 31 six-pounder infantry battery, 20 cavalry battery (12 cannons);
  - Jablonowski brigade: 1. Landwehr battalion of the Nassau infantry regiment, 2. Landwehr battalion of the Nassau infantry regiment, 3. Landwehr battalion of the Nassau infantry regiment, 7. six-pounder infantry battery (6 cannons);
- 2. (Herzinger) infantry division:
  - Theissing brigade: Schneider grenadier battalion, Fischer grenadier battalion, Richter grenadier battalion, Bittermann grenadier battalion, 18 six-pounder infantry battery;
  - Perin brigade: Rattay grenadier battalion, Koudelka grenadier battalion, Pásztory grenadier battalion, Trenk grenadier battalion, 16 six-pounder infantry battery;
- Artillery reserve:
  - 2 twelve-pounder batteries, 1 six-pounder battery, 1 Congreve rocket battery, (24 cannons);

Total: 15,549 men (97 infantry companies), 1880 horses (8 cavalry companies), 48 cannons.

Main artillery reserve of the army:

- 1 six-pounder battery, 2 twelve-pounder infantry batteries, 4 twelve-pounder cavalry batteries, 1 howitzer battery, 4 Congreve rocket batteries, 1 twelve-pounder heavy battery, (78 cannons), 3 sapper companies with 3 military bridge sets;

Total: 2187 men (7 infantry companies), 932 horses, 72 cannons.

Ramberg cavalry division:

- Lederer cavalry brigade: 2 companies of the Franz Joseph cuirassier regiment, 2 companies of the Sunstenau cuirassier regiment, 2 companies of the Emperor Ferdinand cuirassier regiment, 6 companies of the Auersperg cuirassier regiment, 2. cavalry battery (6 cannons);
- Simbschen brigade: 6 companies of the Liechtenstein chevau-légers regiment, 2 companies of the Archduke Johann dragoon regiment, 8 companies of the Imperial uhlan regiment, 4. cavalry battery (6 cannons);

Total: 4254 men (32 cavalry companies), 4,249 horses, 12 cannons. (Note: This reserve cavalry division was formed from the Simbschen brigade, earlier in the I. corps and the Lederer brigade from the IV. corps.)

9. Combined Russian Division:
Commander: Lieutenant General Feodor Sergeyevich Panyutyin

- Kobyakov infantry brigade: 15. Dibich-Zabalkansky jäger regiment, 18. Paskevich-Erivansky jäger regiment (8 battalions);
- Proskuryakov 9. artillery brigade: 1 heavy battery, 3 light batteries, 2 companies of the Civalart uhlan regiment (48 cannons);

Total: 11,672 men (32 cavalry companies), 715 horses, 48 cannons.

Total: 64,448 men, 12,341 horses, 270 cannons.

== Battle ==
Before the battle, Poeltenberg sent Liptay and the bulk of his cavalry to Ménfő, to protect Lieutenant Colonel Kupa's detachment from Szemere from being cut off from Győr, but with this move, he weakened his defense at Győr. The Kupa detachment initially had 2 infantry battalions, 4 Károlyi hussar companies, and a cavalry battery. At Szemere the 10. and 23. Honvéd battalions, which, after the Battle of Ihász, were separated from the Kmety detachment, joined the Kupa detachment. Liptay arrived there and took over the command of the troops, which now were 4 battalions, 8 cavalry companies, and 20 cannons strong against the twice more numerous Austrian troops.

Battle of Győr from 28 June 1849. The situation before 12 o'clock

On the morning of 28 June, at 9 a.m. the battle started at Szemere, where the division led by Lieutenant Colonel Ferenc Liptay was attacked by the Austrian III corps. The vanguard of the III. corps was represented by the Wolf brigade. Colonel Karl Wolf von Wachentreu sent the 22. kaiserjäger, 2 cavalry companies, and a half battery to attack from the front, while another unit with the same strength tried to encircle the Hungarians. After an artillery preparation, the 22. battalion attacked the Liptay division positioned on a height southeast of Szemere, pushing them back to the edge of the village, but from here they were forced to retreat to the heights behind the Bakony creek, after dismantling the bridge. Now Wolf sent his artillery to the Bakony creek, against which Liptay sent 4 companies of hussars, covered by 4 cannons, but the fire opened by the Austrian artillery and infantry, forced them to retreat to their starting position. Meanwhile, despite the Hungarian artilleries fire, the Austrians rebuilt the bridge over the Bakony, then Wolf's battery managed to cross over it. The rest of the III. corps too crossed the Rába river at Babót, and arrived at Szemere, while a strong Austrian column, which crossed the Rába at Bodonhely, was marching towards Ménfő, which forced the division led by Lieutenant Colonel Ferenc Liptay to retreat towards Kismegyer, (Note: Today it is Győr's southeastern part: Győr-Szabadhegy) to take a position between Ménfő and Csanak, in order not to be separated in the same way as Kmety was a day before, from the Hungarian forces defending Győr, while the hussars covering the retreat fought continuously with the Austrian chevau-légers. When the Liptay division arrived to Csanak, they encountered there another Austrian column, the Schneider brigade, which, after crossing the Rába at 5:00 a.m., headed, through Szarkavár (Note: Today it is part of Tét) towards Ménfő. To defend the flank and the back of the Hungarian positions from Győr, Liptay deployed his troops between Mánfő and Csanak, positioning the infantry on the left flank, on the vineyards, and the cavalry and artillery between these heights and the Rába. But his chances of resisting against the twice numerous enemy, on a disadvantageous (marshy) terrain, were bleak. Schneider sent his infantry against the Hungarian infantry from the left flank, while with his 6 companies of uhlans he attacked the 4 Hussar companies and the Hungarian artillery. The uhlans' attack was so successful that they captured a battery together with an ammunition wagon, forcing Liptay to retreat again from this position. Schneider decided to remain at Csanak, and did not pursue him.

Because Poeltenberg sent the Liptay division to reinforce Lieutenant Colonel Kupa at Szemere, he had insufficient troops to secure the Győr-Kismegyer-Nagymegyer-Nagybaráti line, a good defensive position Győr which fortifications were too large for Poeltenberg's troops, so he decided to slowly withdraw. First, he gave away the first defensive line that led West from Győr and retreated to the smaller second line. At 9 o'clock he assigned Lieutenant Colonel Sándor Kossuth to the city's defense and rushed towards Ménfő. Kossuth had to work with his infantry division, the smaller part of the cavalry division, the reserve, and the reinforcements sent by General György Klapka.

Battle of Győr from 28 June 1849. The situation before 2 p.m

On the imperial side, the attempts of the IV. (or reserve) corps led by Lieutenant-general Ludwig von Wohlgemuth, to cross the Rába near Rábapatona, because of the marshy banks of the river, were unsuccessful. Haynau, who knew about the successful advance of the III. corps on the right flank, at 7:00 a.m., ordered him to renounce the crossing, and to advance with the bulk of the corps towards the Vienna-suburb, bordered by the Rába and the Rábca rivers, and to attack from behind the Hungarian units guarding the Rábca bridge from Abda, sending the Jablonowski brigade forward, along the Rába, to cross it at a suitable crossing point, and to establish contact with the Schneider brigade.

At the same time, Haynau sent Franz Schlik with the I. corps, to attack, between the Little Danube and the Rábca rivers, in collaboration with the IV. corps, the crossing point from Abda, then, with a portion of his troops the Vienna-suburb, and with the other against Győrsziget (Győr island) suburb. After the capture of Győr, the I., and the IV. corps had to advance to Győrszentiván. (Note: In 1849 it was a village, today is part of Győr)

The vanguard of the I. corps, represented by the Bianchi brigade, departed from Barátföld (Note: In 1849 it was a small locality, today it is part of Lébény) towards Öttevény at 9:00 a.m., where they took a wider formation, on its right wing with 2 battalions, with the duty to assure the connection with the IV. corps, while on its left wing, with 1 1/2 battalion, a half cavalry company, and a half battery marching along the bank of the Little Danube, having also the mission to reestablish the connection with the 3 battalions, 2 jäger companies, 2 cavalry companies and 1 battery of the Reischach brigade, which departed from Dunaszeg at 11:00 a.m., and was heading, through Győrzámoly and Győrújfalu, to Révfalu. (Note: Today it is part of Győr) The bulk of the Bianchi brigade was followed by the Sartori brigade and the artillery reserve of their corps. The Bianchi brigade was spotted by the Hungarian defenders of Abda led by Lieutenant Colonel Sándor Kossuth, who ordered his artillery to shoot at the Austrian. Meanwhile, the IV. corps advanced through Lesvár, (Note: In 1849 it was a village, today is part of Ikrény) and when its vanguard brigade, led by the royalist Hungarian Major General Ludwig von Benedek, arrived in the vicinity of Abda, he found there the Hungarian infantry along the road, and his cavalry and artillery south from the village, led by Sándor Kossuth. When the latter saw the approaching enemy, he ordered his artillery to start shooting. Benedek too gave the order to his two batteries to advance and respond and ordered his cavalry to attack. Seeing this, Poeltenberg gave the order to the defenders of the bridge, to burn it, and retreat to the main fortifications in front of the Vienna-suburb, knowing that Wohlgemuth's troops could attack them from the rear. The Austrian I and IV corps followed the retreating Hungarian troops. After they occupied the bridge from Abda, the imperial Bianchi brigade, with the exception of the 6. jäger battalion and 9 cannons, left at Abda to rebuild the bridge, and advanced towards Győrsziget, while the Sartori brigade advanced against the Vienna suburb. After finishing, at 3:00 p.m., rebuilding the bridge, the 6. jäger battalion had to advance through Fácános along the main road. Next to them, the Benedek brigade was advancing, while the Simbschen brigade marched from Dunaszeg towards Révfalu.

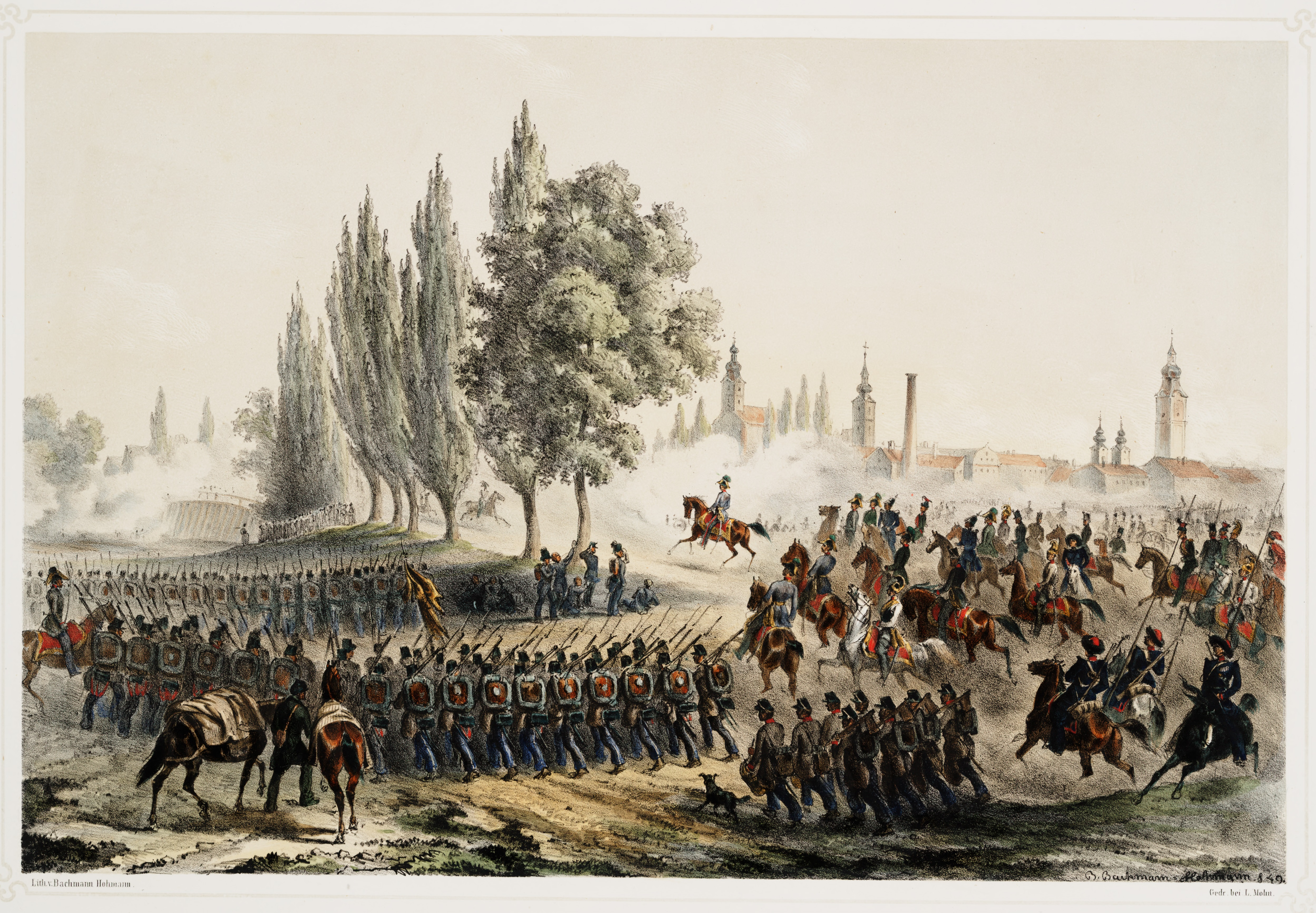
Battle of Győr on 28 June 1849. B. Bachmann-Hohmann 1850The emperor Franz Joseph I of Austria enters Győr leading the Austrian troops.

Görgei departed from Tata early on 28 June traveling to Gőnyű, before continuing towards Győr. At Szentjánospuszta he met with II. corps, which was marching towards Győr, and ordered József Kászonyi to move towards Koroncó. When Görgei reached Győr (according to some sources around 11:00, while according to others between 1:00 - 2:00 p.m.) he learned that the battle was underway, and Poeltenberg gave up the first defensive line West of the city. The main fighting took place around Ménfő. Görgei headed there, on his way there, he met with Poeltenberg and ordered him to return to the city, while he continued towards Ménfő, to take command. He knew that his troops could only keep Győr if they could hold until the next day when he expected the II corps to arrive. He needed to hold Ménfő at all costs. But before he arrived there, he received Liptay's report that he was forced to retreat to Szabadhegy, at 2:00 p.m (according to Captain István Görgey).

At 1:24 in the afternoon, Schlik, as the senior officer, took over the leadership of the Austrian forces between the Rába and Rábca, ordering the Benedek brigade to advance on the right wing, and the I. corps, to deploy for a general assault. Then he gave the order to the I. and the IV. corps, to start their decisive attack against Győr.

Franz Schlik concentrated many units and the 42 cannons of the III. and IV. corps, in semicircle formation, encircling with them the left wing of the Hungarian earthworks in front of the Vienna-suburb, and ordered them to fire at them for two hours, blowing up 4 carriages with ammunition and causing important losses to the Hungarian infantry behind the outworks but, despite these losses, and their numerical inferiority, the Hungarians resisted so successfully, that, at some point, Lieutenant Colonel Kossuth sent the concentrated Hungarian cavalry to attack the right flank of the IV. corps. Schlik responded to this by sending the cavalry regiment of the Benedek brigade, followed, as a second line, by the Lederer cavalry brigade to attack them from the flank, but the Hungarian hussars eluded them, retreating near their infantry.

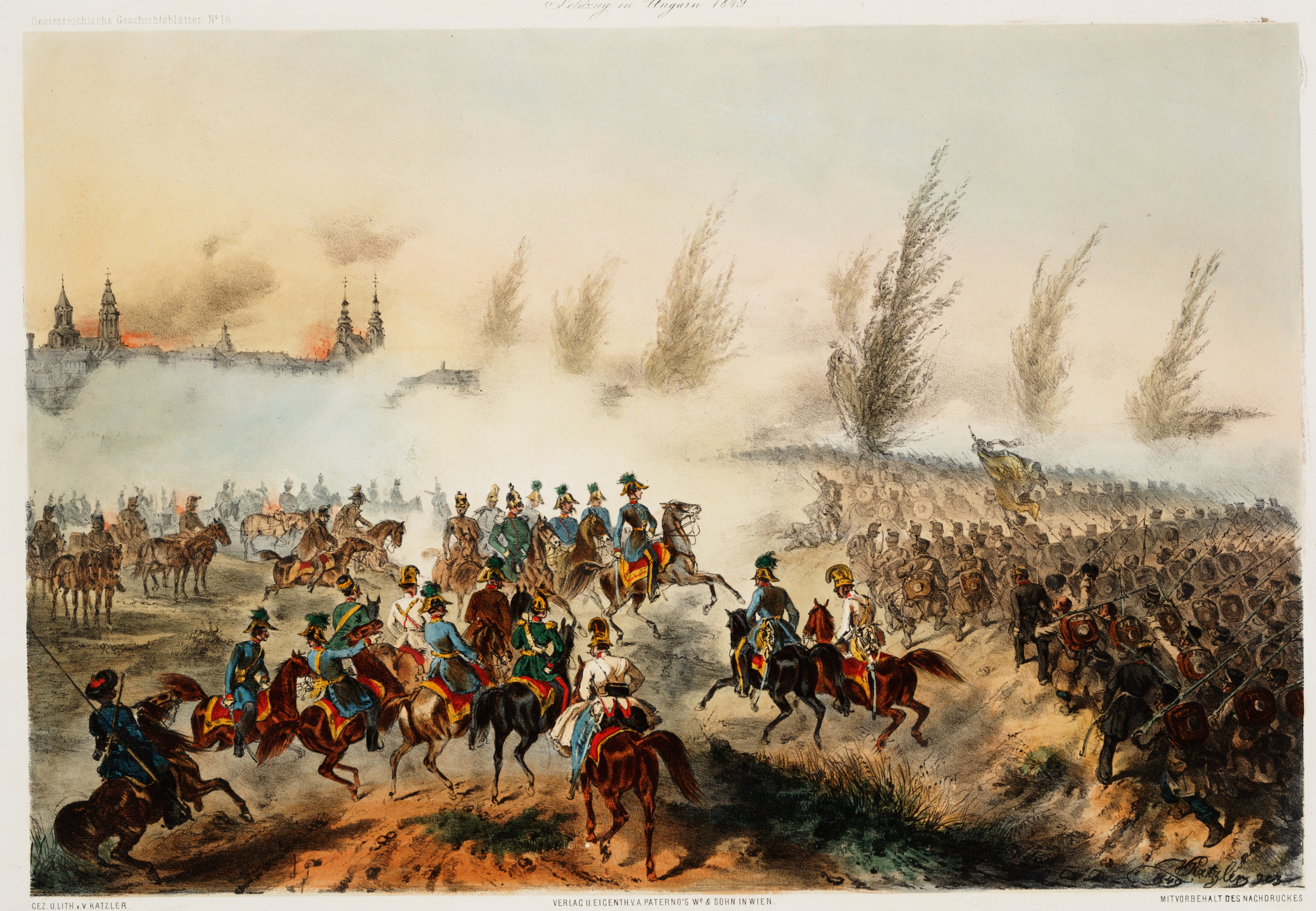
Battle of Győr 28 June 1848 by Vinzenz Katzler. Emperor Franz Joseph I of Austria enters Győr leading the Austrian troops.

At the location between the Rábca and the Little Danube, Haynau's troops were more successful. The Bianchi brigade, led by Prince Franz de Paula of Liechtenstein, entered the Sziget suburb of Győr through the Fácános woods by Pinnyéd. They crossed the Rábca and attacked the rear of the Hungarian troops. On the right wing, Major General Ludwig von Benedek, with 2 companies of grenadiers and the combined cavalry of the IV. corps was trying to enter the Vienna-suburb from the direction of the Rába. At the same time, the Reischach brigade occupied Révfalu and restored the Danube bridge towards Moson.

Battle of Győr from 28 June 1849. The situation before 4 p.m

First, Lieutenant Colonel Kossuth retreated from the earthworks but continued to resist in the Vienna-suburb, barricading its entrances, to enable his artillery to retreat. The Hungarian troops led by Sándor Kossuth which defended Győr and its suburbs, were risking encirclement. Despite this setback, Görgei and Poeltenberg still hoped that their troops can hold out in Győr until the next day, when the II. corps, led by Colonel József Kászonyi, will arrive in support. Only when, at 4:00 p.m., Görgei heard that the Hungarian left flank was forced to retreat, and the right wing was outflanked by the Simbschen brigade, Görgei ordered the troops to retreat from Győr at 4:30 PM, which was carried out at 5 o'clock. At the same time, Görgei ordered Liptay to retreat from Szabadhegy to Hecsepuszta.

The commander of the defending troops, Lieutenant Colonel Sándor Kossuth, was among the last Hungarians to leave. As he left Győr he "bumped into" the advancing imperial infantry, which shot at them, but missed. Kossuth stopped his horse and shouted to them in German:

- Tell your commander, that my name is Kossuth, today I am the last who leaves this town, but tomorrow I will be the first who will enter it again!

- Yeah, right... - answered one soldier. Then Sándor Kossuth turned aside in his saddle, hit his right thigh with his palm, and responded: - So then shoot, you crook! A soldier, whose weapon was loaded, shot him right in the place Kossuth told him to shoot. Kossuth then rode away, without noticing that he was wounded. Sándor Kossuth met Görgei at the Galamb-tavern, where the Hungarian troops had to retreat because they were forced to. The high commander told him: - Go and [tell the medics to bandage] your wound, Sándor, because you are wounded.

- Gosh, the crook really hit [my thigh, right] where I told him to shoot.

Among the imperial troops entering Győr, was Franz Joseph I of Austria, protected by the Benedek brigade.

Görgei ordered that if the imperial tried to advance towards Vének in the Szigetköz, the Hungarian troops must hold. At 6:00 Klapka arrived on the battlefield, while Görgei was arranging the troops that were retreating from Győr. Görgei entrusted Klapka to lead the Liptay division and the other Hungarian units that joined them at Szentjánospuszta, to build a camp. The next day they would retreat to Ács, then on to the fortified camp from Komárom. He ordered Poeltenberg to move, after dismantling the Promenade bridge, to march over to the "Szőllőfürt" (Bunch of Grapes) tavern from Gönyű (Note: According to Klapka and István Görgey its name was "Galamb" (Pigeon)) with the infantry and artillery of the right wing. Then Görgei, leading the cavalry of the VII corps and a cavalry battery, covered the retreat. The Hungarian hussars led by Görgei were attacked by the pursuing Bianchi brigade, led by prince Liechtenstein, and the Wallmoden division. In order to hold these superior infantry masses back, Görgei ordered several, very risky hussar charges against them, and when, at a certain moment, he saw, that only his personal example would be necessary to repulse the enemy, he personally led an attack.

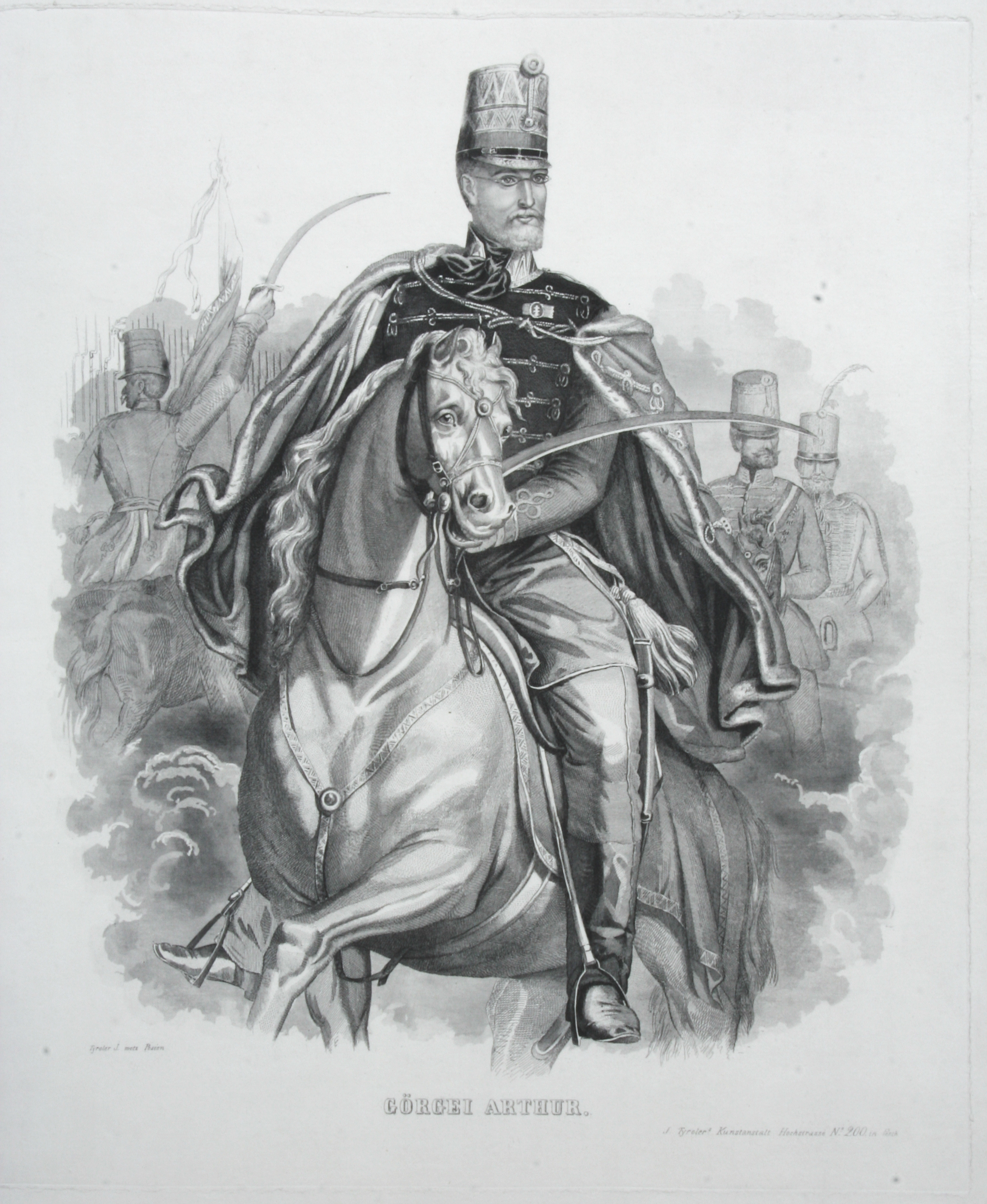
Görgey Artúr

After 1850, Görgei dictated his memoirs about his wartime activity to his brother, István Görgey. He told the latter about what he taught and felt where he was on the lead of the Hungarian hussars, covering his troops' retreat.

Battle of Győr from 28 June 1849. The situation at the end of the battle

At that moment the danger appeared in a so huge shape, and the subofficers which were present there, were so insufficient, that I decided to spare no effort in order to make possible and assure the simple, unperturbed retreat of the exhausted infantry by personally leading the attack of all the cavalry which was available [in that moment], forcing them to fight with all the force which they had... And then I opened my snuff box, broke down my wife's daguerreotype framed under the glass, and wiped it down from the sheet. The gentlemen which were commanding my divisions walked cozily to Gönyű and to Szentjános and saw that the imperial did not even bother, and forgot to think that with only three regiments of hussars I resist for hours to an imperial numbering 66,000 [soldiers], which were drunk of glory, and wishing to achieve a new victory, at Szabadhegy. If then, by chance, I would have been wiped out by a bullet or killed by a sword, [people] would have said: It is a pity that he put himself in front of danger without any reason. A military commander who selfishly pursues ambitious goals, would not put himself in front of such dangerous, but obscure rearguard fights, in which the achievable public glory is determined by the lesser involvement in them.

Thanks to this fight, Görgei managed to save his army. Poeltenberg's performance in leading the retreat of the infantry and artillery is notable. The imperial main commander, Julius von Haynau, and his chief of general staff, Colonel Wilhelm Ramming put up a good performance surprising the Hungarian defense of Győr. However, despite their numerical superiority, the fact that the Austro-Russian army took control over Győr and gained the initiative in the war, the fact that the hugely outnumbered Hungarian army retreated without important losses, can be considered as their success.

== Aftermath ==
After the fights ended, the Benedek brigade remained in Győr, while the rest of the IV. corps took position on the heights near Szabadhegy, the Wallmoden division remained at Gönyű, the Bianchi brigade encamped at Győrszentiván. The Scheider brigade advanced to Örkénypuszta, (Note: In 1849 it was a farm, today is part of Győr) and joined the I. corps again. The commander of the III. corps, Lieutenant General Moltke, pursued with a detachment the retreating Liptay division, while the bulk of the corps, encamped at Tényő. The Gerstner brigade left Ihász and headed towards Gyarmat, following the Kmety division, while the Bechtold and the Panyutyin divisions which did not participate in the battle, encamped between Szabadhegy and Győr.

After the battle Haynau's troops followed the retreating Hungarians to Komárom. The Austrian commander started a new attack on 2 July, in order to force Görgei's troops to retreat to the fortress, opening his road to Budapest. Except for losing that important city, the military consequences were not severe for the Hungarians. However, the situation worsened because of other, mostly political, reasons.

When Lajos Kossuth first learned about the defeat, he did not consider the situation grave for the Hungarian cause. After reading the letters of government commissioner János Ludvigh, who tried to convince him and the government to leave, arguing that the imperial could soon occupy the capital, and hearing the news sent by General Józef Wysocki that the Russian troops had occupied Miskolc, he gathered the ministry council, and Görgei's absence decided to leave the Hungarian capital, ordering Görgei to retreat with the main Hungarian army from Komárom, and move to Southern Hungary with the government. Görgei consented, despite considering this decision a mistake, promising that he would depart with his troops on 3 July. Despite this, a misunderstanding between Kossuth and Görgei brought the Hungarian military situation near a tragic turning point. On 30 June Görgei sent two letters to Kossuth, which he read in reverse order, and because of this he thought that Görgei disobeyed him. He ordered Görgei to be replaced with Lieutenant General Lázár Mészáros, an untalented commander who had lost all his battles. On 2 July, Mészáros was on a steamboat on his way to Komárom with the order of replacement in his pocket, when he heard the sounds of the second battle of Komárom, which was in progress. He did not arrive in time to play a role in this battle in which Görgei forced Haynau's twice bigger army to retreat.

== Sources ==
- Bona, Gábor (1996). Az 1848–1849-es szabadságharc története ("The history of the Hungarian War of Independence of 1848–1849) (in Hungarian). Budapest. ISBN 963-8218-20-7.
- Bóna, Gábor (1987). Tábornokok és törzstisztek a szabadságharcban 1848–49 ("Generals and Staff Officers in the War of Independence 1848–1849") (in Hungarian). Budapest: Zrínyi Katonai Kiadó. p. 430. ISBN 963-326-343-3.
- Görgey, Artúr (2004). Életem és működésem Magyarországon 1848-ban és 1849-ben- Görgey István fordítását átdolgozta, a bevezetőt és a jegyzeteket írta Katona Tamás (My Life and Activity in Hungary in 1848 and in 1849). István Görgey's translation was revised by Tamás Katona, and also he wrote the Introduction and the Notes. Neumann Kht.
- Hermann, Róbert (1999). "AZ IHÁSZI ÜTKÖZET EMLÉKKÖNYVE 1849-1999". mek.oszk.hu. Pápa.
- Hermann, Róbert (2001). Az 1848–1849-es szabadságharc hadtörténete ("Military History of the Hungarian War of Independence of 1848–1849") (in Hungarian). Budapest: Korona Kiadó. ISBN 963-9376-21-3.
- Hermann, Róbert (2004). Az 1848–1849-es szabadságharc nagy csatái ("Great battles of the Hungarian War of Independence of 1848–1849") (in Hungarian). Budapest: Zrínyi. ISBN 963-327-367-6.
- Hermann, Róbert (2002), "Kossuth és Görgei (Kossuth and Görgei.)", Korunk
- Hermann, Róbert (1996), "Kossuth Sándor visszaemlékezése az 1849. június 28-i győri csatára (Sándor Kossuth's Recall about the Battle of Győr from 28 June 1849)", Győri Tanulmányok - Tudományos Szemle, pp. 76-108.
- Lugosy, István (1931). Győr és vidéke 1848-49-ben (Győr and its Surroundings in 1848 and in 1849). Különnyonat a Győri Szemle II. évfolyamából.
- Pusztaszeri, László (1984). Görgey Artúr a szabadságharcban ("Artúr Görgey in the War of Independence") (in Hungarian). Budapest: Magvető Könyvkiadó. p. 784. ISBN 963-14-0194-4.
