= András Néher =

Hungarian politician

Member of the National Assembly
- Incumbent
- Assumed office 9 May 2026
- Preceded by: Ákos Kara
- Constituency: Győr-Moson-Sopron 2nd

Personal details
- Born: Győr, Hungary
- Party: TISZA

András Néher is a Hungarian politician who has been the member of the National Assembly for Győr-Moson-Sopron County 2nd constituency since 2026. A member of the Tisza Party, he also sits in the Parliamentary Assembly of the Council of Europe (PACE).

== Early life and education ==
Néher was born in Győr and grew up in the city's Marcalváros district. He studied history at university in Budapest.

== Career ==
Before entering politics, Néher spent about fifteen years working for large companies as a strategic procurement specialist. One of these was Audi, where he worked on supply-chain security and supported the development of new models. He lived and worked in London, Debrecen and Budapest before returning to the Győr area.

== Political career ==
In November 2025 Néher was selected as the Tisza Party's candidate for Győr-Moson-Sopron County 2nd constituency. His campaign focused on the southern part of the Győr area, which covers 34 settlements, and on local roads, public transport, jobs and access to healthcare.

He won the seat at the 2026 Hungarian parliamentary election with 54.85% of the vote (33,263 votes), ahead of Dávid Fekete of Fidesz–KDNP on 36.97%.

Since 22 June 2026 he has been a substitute member of Hungary's delegation to PACE, where he sits with the Group of the European People's Party. He is a full member of the Committee on Migration, International Protection and Economic Co-operation and an alternate member of the Committee on Legal Affairs and Human Rights.

== Personal life ==
Néher lives in Tényő with his family. He has four children.
