= The Secret of Moonacre =

- Theatrical release poster
- Directed by: Gábor Csupó
- Screenplay by: Graham Alborough; Lucy Shuttleworth
- Based on: The Little White Horse by Elizabeth Goudge
- Produced by: David Brown; Michael Cowan; Brian Donovan; Meredith Garlick; Monica Penders; Jason Piette
- Starring: Ioan Gruffudd; Tim Curry; Natascha McElhone; Juliet Stevenson; Dakota Blue Richards
- Cinematography: David Eggby
- Edited by: Julian Rodd
- Music by: Christian Henson
- Production companies: Velvet Octopus; UK Film Council; Forgan-Smith Entertainment; Spice Factory; LWH Films; Eurofilm Stúdió; Davis Films; Grand Allure Entertainment; Aramid Entertainment
- Distributed by: Warner Bros. Pictures (United Kingdom); Metropolitan Filmexport (France); Rialto Distribution (Australia and New Zealand); Hungaricom (Hungary)
- Release dates: 6 September 2008 (TIFF); 6 February 2009 (United Kingdom); 13 May 2009 (France); 19 November 2009 (Hungary)
- Running time: 103 minutes
- Countries: France; United Kingdom; Hungary; Australia; United States
- Language: English
- Budget: $27 million
- Box office: $7 million

The Secret of Moonacre is a 2008 fantasy film loosely based on the 1946 novel The Little White Horse by Elizabeth Goudge. The film was directed by Gábor Csupó and starred Dakota Blue Richards in the leading role and with Ioan Gruffudd, Tim Curry, Natascha McElhone and Juliet Stevenson in supporting roles. The film premiered at the 2008 Toronto International Film Festival and was released in the United Kingdom on 6 February 2009 by Warner Bros. Pictures.

== Plot ==
Maria Merryweather inherits a book after her father's death: The Ancient Chronicles of Moonacre Valley. She reads of the first Moon Princess receiving magical pearls from the moon. At her wedding with a Merryweather, her father, a de Noir, presented the couple with a black lion, while the groom gifted his bride a unicorn. When the princess revealed the pearls, the two families were possessed by greed.

Forced to leave her London home, Maria and her governess, Miss Heliotrope, go to stay at Moonacre Manor with her estranged uncle Sir Benjamin Merryweather. Sir Benjamin warns of bandits and instructs Maria to stay away from the forest and the de Noirs, the rival family. After riding with her uncle, Maria hears a distressed cry and sneaks into the forest, where she is surrounded by bandits, including a boy named Robin de Noir. Before they can kidnap her, Sir Benjamin's intimidating black dog, Wrolf, frightens them away.

When Maria finally continues reading the book, she discovers that the two families fought over the pearls and the Moon Princess cursed Moonacre Valley to be plunged into eternal darkness at the rising of the 5000th moon, unless a "pure heart" is heard. The Manor's chef Marmaduke tells Maria she is the new Moon Princess, as she can see the unicorn, and only such a one can undo the curse. Maria figures out that the very next full moon will be the 5000th. Frightened, she runs away and finds a cave inhabited by a woman named Loveday. Loveday reveals she herself was a Moon Princess, but failed to unite the families and break the curse. Maria realises that the de Noirs stole the casket containing the pearls and the Merryweathers took the key to it.

Finding the key in the book's bookmark, Maria sneaks into the fortress, but is spotted by Robin's father Coeur de Noir. She gives him the key but he reveals that the casket is empty, accusing the Merryweathers of stealing them. Maria escapes and is led home by Wrolf. At the manor, she meets Loveday, who gives her more information: Loveday and Sir Benjamin were once engaged until Loveday revealed she was a de Noir; Sir Benjamin, furious, broke off the engagement and Loveday ran away. Maria then notices a painting of the first Moon Princess, who shows her where she hid the pearls in the forest. Maria sends forged letters to Sir Benjamin and Loveday convincing them to meet, then persuades Robin to help her. Meanwhile, Loveday and Sir Benjamin meet and discover Maria's deception. Together with Miss Heliotrope, Marmaduke, and the "halfwit" servant Digweed, they set out to search for her.

Back in the forest Maria and Robin find the pearls in hollow tree and escape through a secret tunnel. Coeur's men pursue them and kill Wrolf in the process. Coeur reaches the cliff where the valley was cursed just before the moon is about to rise. Sir Benjamin then arrives with Digweed and Marmaduke, followed moments later by Maria and Robin. Loveday, revealed to be Coeur's daughter, also arrives. Maria pleads to her uncle and Coeur to put aside their pride and so break the curse, but fails. She then realizes she must do it herself, and jumps into the sea with the pearls. A huge wave surges towards the cliff and Maria appears on the back of the white unicorn. A revived Wrolf appears, having resumed his true form: the black lion. Sir Benjamin and Loveday reconcile, and Miss Heliotrope finally arrives. The Merryweathers and de Noirs are united, the curse is lifted, Moonacre Valley is restored.

== Cast ==
- Dakota Blue Richards as Maria Merryweather
- Juliet Stevenson as Miss Heliotrope
- Augustus Prew as Robin de Noir
- Michael Webber as Digweed
- Ioan Gruffudd as Sir Benjamin Merryweather / Sir Wrolf Merryweather
- Tim Curry as Coeur de Noir / Sir William de Noir
- Andy Linden as Marmaduke Scarlet
- Natascha McElhone as Loveday de Noir/The Moon Princess

== Production ==
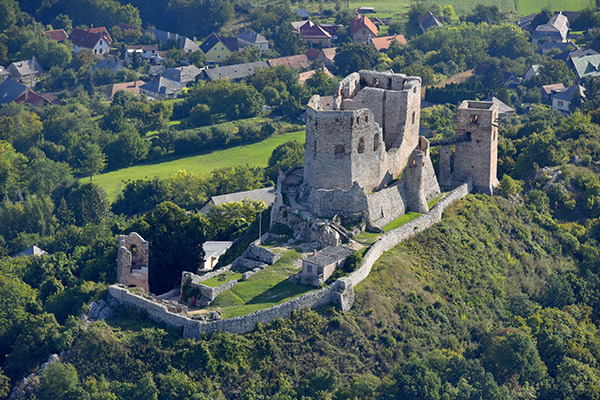
Csesznek Castle – The "de Noir Fortress"

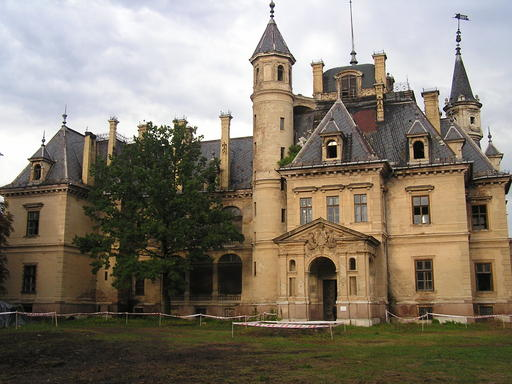
Schossberger Castle – "Moonacre Manor"

=== Pre-production ===
In pre-production it was decided the film needed a different title from the book. An internet poll was run, giving fans of the book a chance to vote for their preferred title: The Moon Princess or The Secret of Moonacre. The Secret of Moonacre won.

=== Filming ===
Filming began in September 2007. While a few scenes were filmed in London, England, most of the film was shot in Hungary. Locations included Dobogókő, Alcsútdoboz, Csesznek, and Budapest. The Csesznek Castle was one of main outdoor locations, while the director Gábor Csupó chose Schossberger Castle to "embody" the Moonacre mansion.

=== Music ===
The film's score was composed by Christian Henson and features the Sacconi Quartet. The soundtrack album was released digitally on 17 February and on CD on 17 March 2009. The soundtrack includes the song "Stars", co-written by Henson and Caroline Lost, and performed by singer Skye Edwards. Lost sang on her own version of the song, "Stars (Lullaby Version)", released as a single in February 2009.

== Release ==
The Secret of Moonacre premiered on 6 September 2008 at the 2008 Toronto International Film Festival, and featured at the New York International Children's Film Festival in February and March 2009. The film was released in cinemas in the United Kingdom on 6 February 2009.

=== Box office ===
It recouped less than its budget of $27 million, grossing $1,437,637 in the United Kingdom and a worldwide total of $7,070,330.

=== Critical response ===
The Secret of Moonacre has a 23% approval rating on Rotten Tomatoes, based on 22 reviews with an average rating of 4.13/10. The website's critical consensus reads, "Despite impressive production values, this is staid, plodding and unimpressive fantasy-fare, with poor performances struggling with an underdeveloped script."

The Secret of Moonacre was met with a mixed reception from critics. Some criticized the film's script and acting. Philip French of The Observer called it "A film about magic that remains obdurately unmagical." Rating the film one out of five stars, The Independent's Anthony Quinn wrote that it had a "sluggish narrative" and accused it of "trying to hitch a lift on the Potter gravy train." Simon Reynolds of Digital Spy wrote that the film was "let down by a script with tin-eared dialogue" and "laboured direction", but found the cast's "hilarious acting misjudgements" enjoyable nonetheless. Kevin Maher of The National referred to the film as "bargain-basement fantasy", complaining that its plot was too predictable.

Other critics were more positive. Rating the film four out of five stars, Fleur Cogle of The Timaru Herald praised The Secret of Moonacre as a "fun family movie" with "fast-paced storytelling and beautiful effects" and noted that it "has a subtle message about nature and our relationship with the natural world". Helen O'Hara of Empire rated the film three stars out of five, and wrote that it gave the "somewhat sedate book"'s story "a dose of action and adventure, giving it appeal for the Harry Potter generation". Also giving the film three stars, Siân Scott of The Telegraph found that it had "plenty to charm". Newshub's Kim Choe praised the film's "lush colours and elaborate costumes" and wrote that "the larger-than-life characters should be lovable and adventurous enough to keep a young audience entertained". Francesca Rudkin of The New Zealand Herald wrote that "The story may be set in Victorian England, but its interpretation of the period is wonderfully wacky, with the sets a mix of minimalistic, medieval and dream-like. The production design is both a blessing and a curse; it does add much-needed elements of magic and whimsy to the story, it's just that no one seems quite sure how to act within this strange environment."

Dakota Blue Richards' performance in the lead role was well received by critics.
