= Bakonygyirót =

- Coat of arms

- Location of Győr-Moson-Sopron county in Hungary

- Location of Bakonygyirót
- Coordinates: 47.41920°N 17.80553°E
- Country: Hungary
- County: Győr-Moson-Sopron

Area
  - Total: 6.85 km^{2} (2.64 sq mi)

Population (2004)
  - Total: 178
  - Density: 25.98/km^{2} (67.3/sq mi)
- Time zone: UTC+1 (CET)
  - Summer (DST): UTC+2 (CEST)
- Postal code: 8433
- Area code: 88

Bakonygyirót (Hungarian pronunciation: [ˈbɒkoɲɟiroːt]) is a village in Győr-Moson-Sopron county, Hungary. It lies on the county border, between the Sokorói hills and Bakony. It was called Gyirót until 1909. The first written mention of the settlement dates back to 1237, when it was referred to as Gyrolt.

== History ==
The area belonged to Czesznek Castle through the 18th century. It was depopulated during the Turkish subjugation. In the 18th century, its new owners, the Esterházy family, encouraged German settlers to move there.

As of 2022, Bakonygyirót had a population of 170.

== Landmarks ==
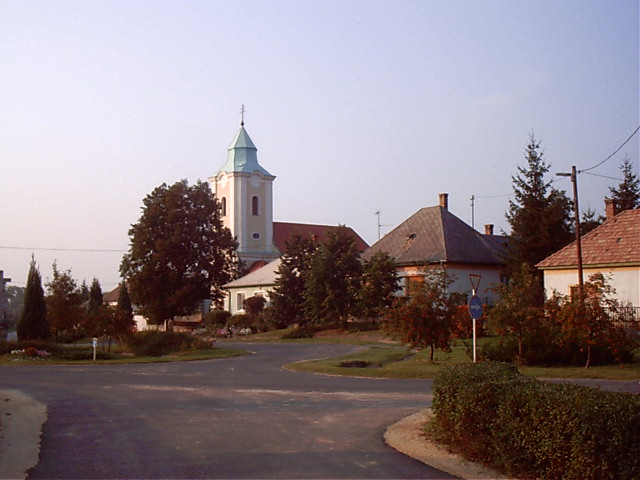
The church / A templom

The Roman Catholic Church in Bakongyirót features a Baroque medieval sanctuary.

A World War II memorial dedicated in 1989 is located at Béke tér.

There is a row of 75 historic Swabian cellars in Bakongyirót which are now popular for local excursions and weekend events, offering wine-tasting and entertainment.

== Public services ==
Local children attend school in Bakonyszentlászló, and are transported by school bus. A nine-passenger village bus transports elderly residents to the outpatient medical center in Pannonhalma.
