= Monica Penders =

Australian film producer (born 1964)

Monica Penders (born 10 February 1964, in Canberra, Australia) is an Australian film producer.

== Life and career ==
At the age of 13, Monica decided to be involved in the movies after seeing Star Wars 11 times at the cinema. Penders graduated from Griffith University, Australia with a Bachelor of Arts majoring in film and media studies and studied film at New York University and the New School.

She worked for nearly 20 years in Australia and the US in public relations, organizational development, advertising, and marketing. Her last corporate position was as Vice President – Public and Media Relations for Lend Lease Real Estate Investments. She worked in marketing with The Walt Disney Company, and started her own public relations and communications business.

After moving from Sydney to New York in 1998, Penders worked on films such as I'll Take You There which was written and directed by Adrienne Shelly, as well as numerous student films at Columbia University where she assisted in the university's film festivals. She was involved in theater projects such as The Indian Wants the Bronx and directed public relations for an independent film company.

Penders returned to Australia in 2009 to become Director of ScreenACT, the office of Film, TV and Digital Media in the Australian Capital Territory. She continued producing projects under the Batavia Creative brand and was recently awarded grants from Screen Australia and artsACT for her feature project Eight Seasons.

She was a founding partner of Forgan-Smith Entertainment, for whom she helped to produce the film The Secret of Moonacre.

In 2014 Monica and Screen ACT produced a film called 'Locks of Love'.
