= Okoč =

Okoč Ekecs
- Municipality
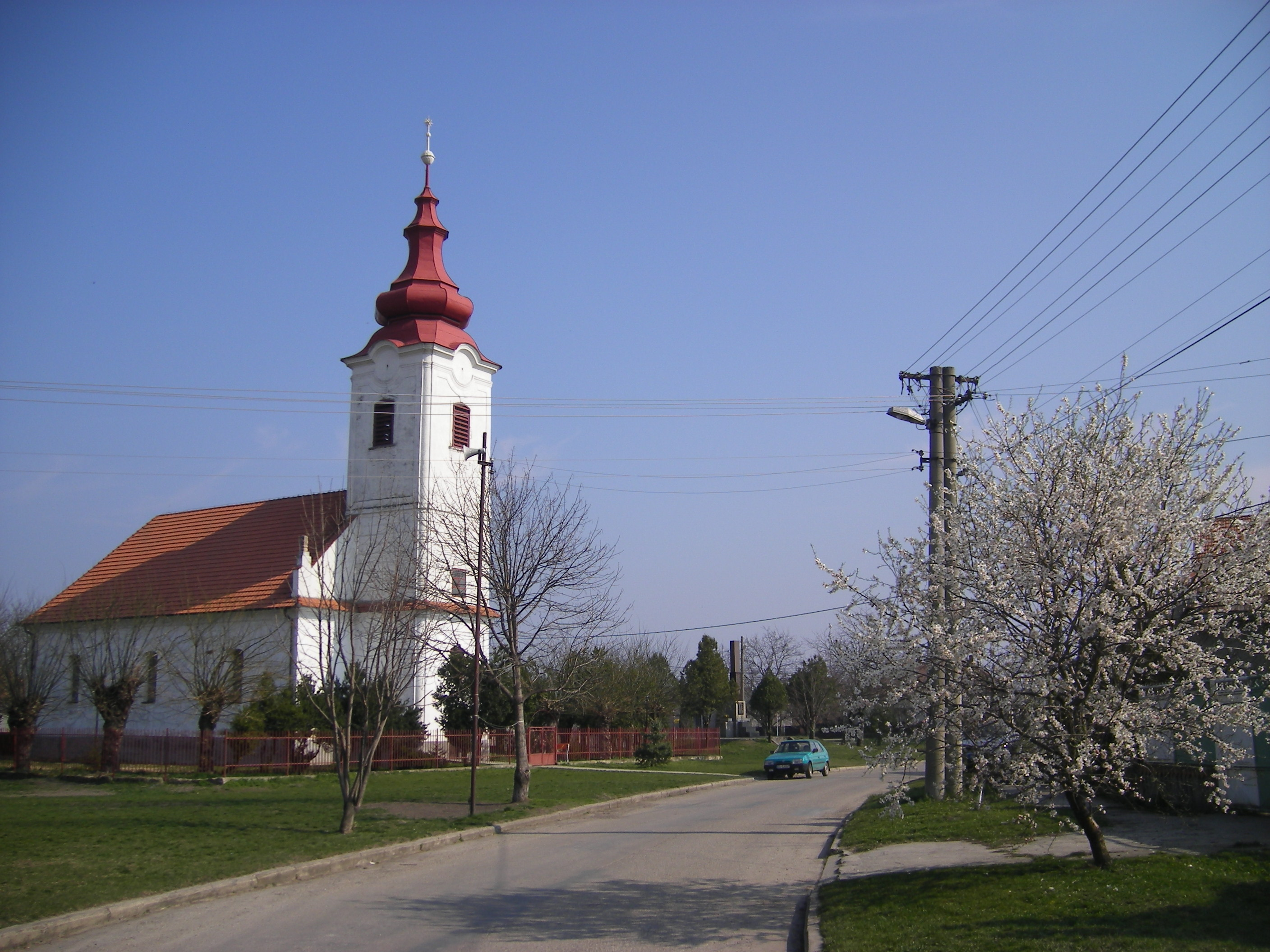

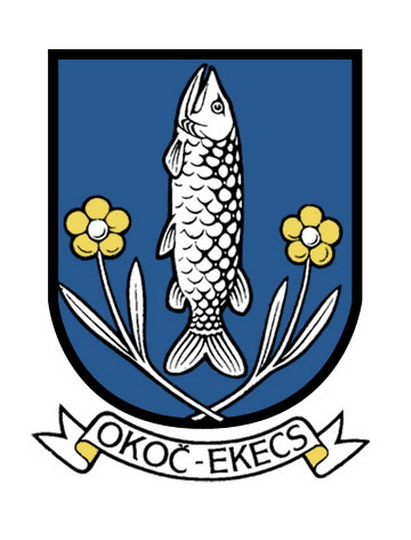
- Flag Coat of arms

- Location of Okoč in the Trnava Region Location of Okoč in Slovakia
- Coordinates: 47.88°N 17.82°E
- Country: Slovakia
- Region: Trnava Region
- District: Dunajská Streda District
- First mentioned: 1268

Government
  - Mayor: László Polák

Area
  - Total: 63.42 km^{2} (24.49 sq mi)
- Elevation: 112 m (367 ft)

Population (2025)
  - Total: 3,659

Ethnicity
- Time zone: UTC+1 (CET)
  - Summer (DST): UTC+2 (CEST)
- Postal code: 930 28
- Area code: +421 31
- Vehicle registration plate (until 2022): DS
- Website: www.okoc.sk

Okoč (Hungarian: Ekecs, pronounced [ˈɛkɛtʃ]) is a village and municipality in the Dunajská Streda District in the Trnava Region of south-west Slovakia.

== Component villages ==
The municipality comprises the following villages and manors:

In Slovak	In Hungarian
Opatovský Sokolec	Apácaszakállas
Asód	Aszódpuszta
Jánošíkovo na Ostrove	Béle
Okoč	Ekecs
Nový Goľáš	Gólyás
Veľký Sek	Nagyszegmajor
Dropie	Túzokpuszta
Viharoš	Viharos

== Population ==
Population statistic (10 years)
Year	1995	2005	2015	2025
Count	3627	3756	3625	3659
Difference		+3.55%	−3.48%	+0.93%

Population statistic
Year	2024	2025
Count	3661	3659
Difference		−0.05%

It has a population of 3659 people (31 December 2025).

=== Ethnicity ===
Census 2021 (1+ %)
Ethnicity	Number	Fraction
Hungarian	3244	87.58%
Slovak	412	11.12%
Not found out	215	5.8%
Total	3704	

In year 2021 was 3704 people by ethnicity 3244 as Hungarian, 412 as Slovak, 215 as Not found out, 19 as Romani, 6 as Czech, 4 as Vietnamese, 4 as German, 3 as Other, 1 as Ukrainian and 1 as Polish.

Note on population: The difference values of population numbers in the table "Population statistic" and in the sections "Ethnicity" & "Religion" is caused by the use of various statistical methods.

=== Religion ===
Census 2021 (1+ %)
Religion	Number	Fraction
Roman Catholic Church	1605	43.33%
None	907	24.49%
Calvinist Church	902	24.35%
Not found out	152	4.1%
Greek Catholic Church	49	1.32%
Evangelical Church	48	1.3%
Total	3704	

In year 2021 was 3704 people by religion 1605 from Roman Catholic Church, 907 from None, 902 from Calvinist Church, 152 from Not found out, 49 from Greek Catholic Church, 48 from Evangelical Church, 10 from Christian Congregations in Slovakia, 9 from Other and not ascertained christian church, 6 from Buddhism, 4 from Old Catholic Church, 4 from United Methodist Church, 3 from Jehovah's Witnesses, 3 from Baptists Church, 1 from Other and 1 from Ad hoc movements.

In 1910, the village had 544, for the most part, Hungarian inhabitants. At the 2001 Census the recorded population of the village was 3804 while an end-2008 estimate by the Statistical Office had the village's population as 3794. As of 2001, 92.53% of its population were Hungarians while 6.07% were Slovaks. Roman Catholicism is the majority religion of the village, its adherents numbering 60.52% of the total population.

== History ==
In historical records the village was first mentioned in 1268 by it Hungarian name as Ekech. The village was first recorded in 1468 as the estate of the Dóczy family. Until the end of World War I, it was part of Hungary and fell within the Csallóköz district of Komárom County. Until the end of the 19th century, villagers made their living by fishing on the Danube and the Small-Danube. After the Austro-Hungarian army disintegrated in November 1918, Czechoslovak troops occupied the area. After the Treaty of Trianon of 1920, the village became officially part of Czechoslovakia. In November 1938, the First Vienna Award granted the area to Hungary and it was held by Hungary until 1945. After Soviet occupation in 1945, Czechoslovak administration returned and the village became officially part of Czechoslovakia in 1947. The present municipality was formed in 1976 when Opatovský Sokolec (Apácaszakállas) and Okoč (Ekecs) were unified following the merger of the respective agricultural co-operatives in 1973.

== Geography ==
The municipality lies at an altitude of 112 metres (367 ft) and covers an area of 63.42 km^{2} (24.49 sq mi) (2025).

== Picture gallery ==
Okoč (Ekecs)

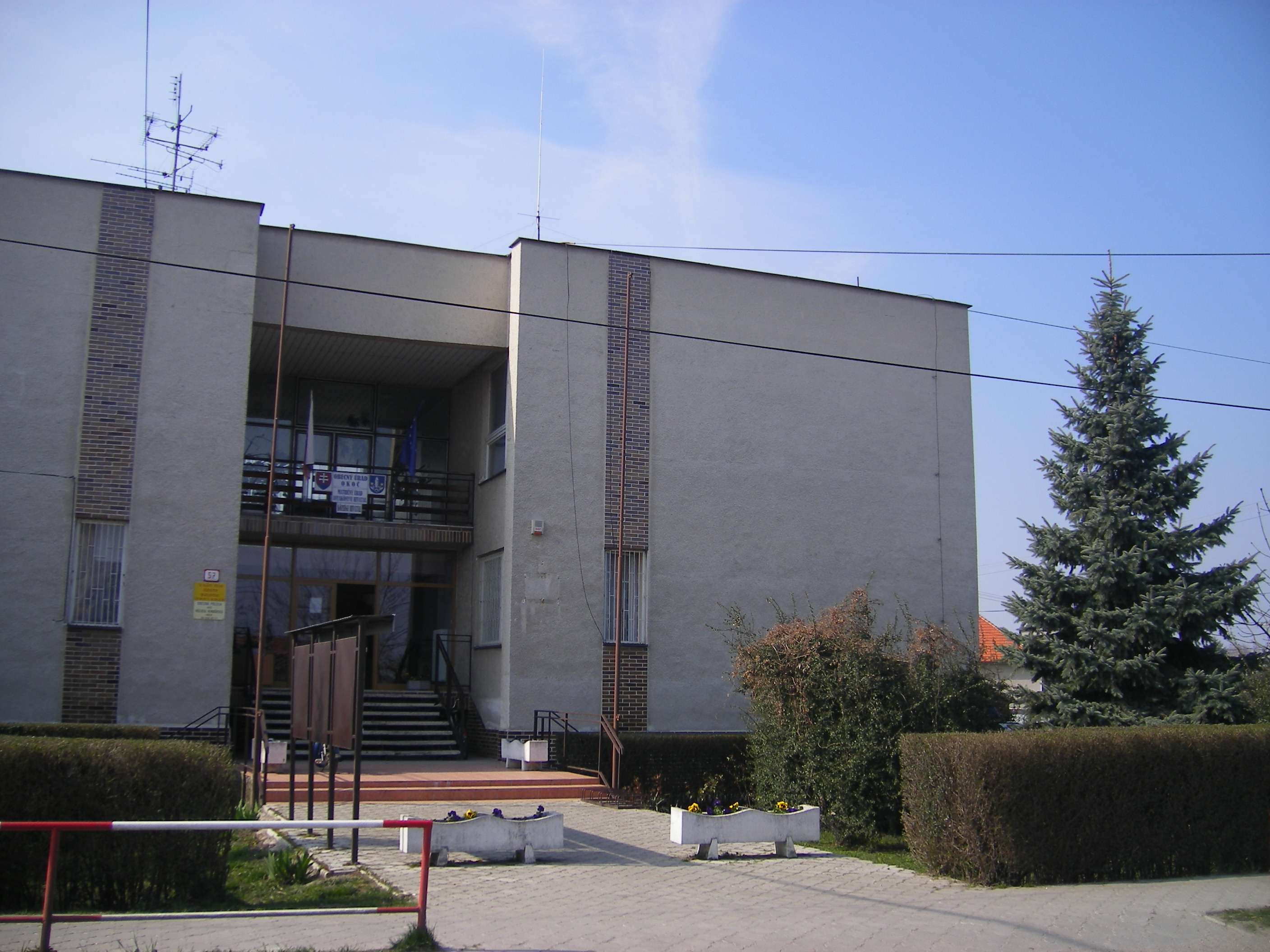
The village hall built in the 1980s

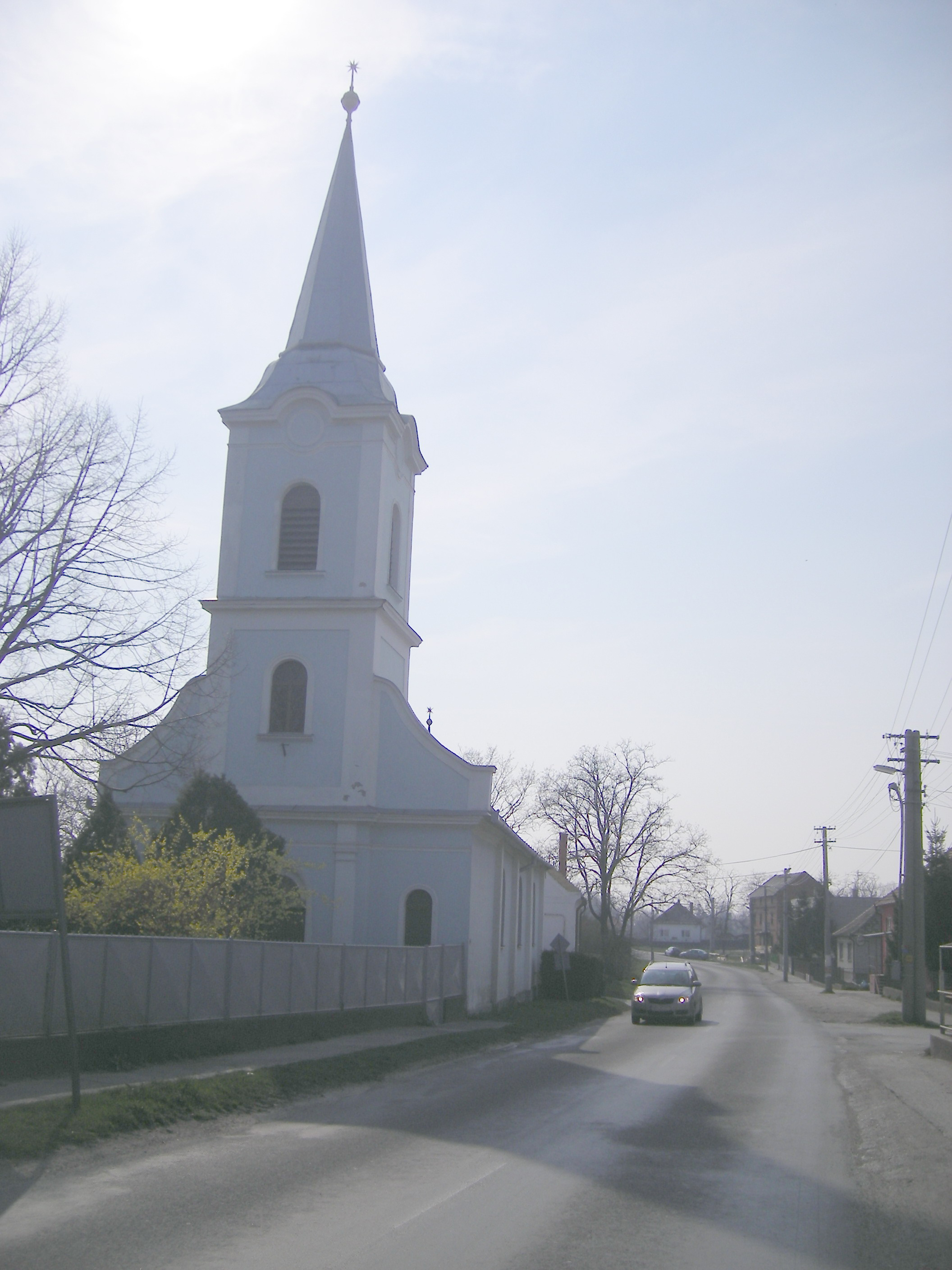
The Hungarian Reformed church

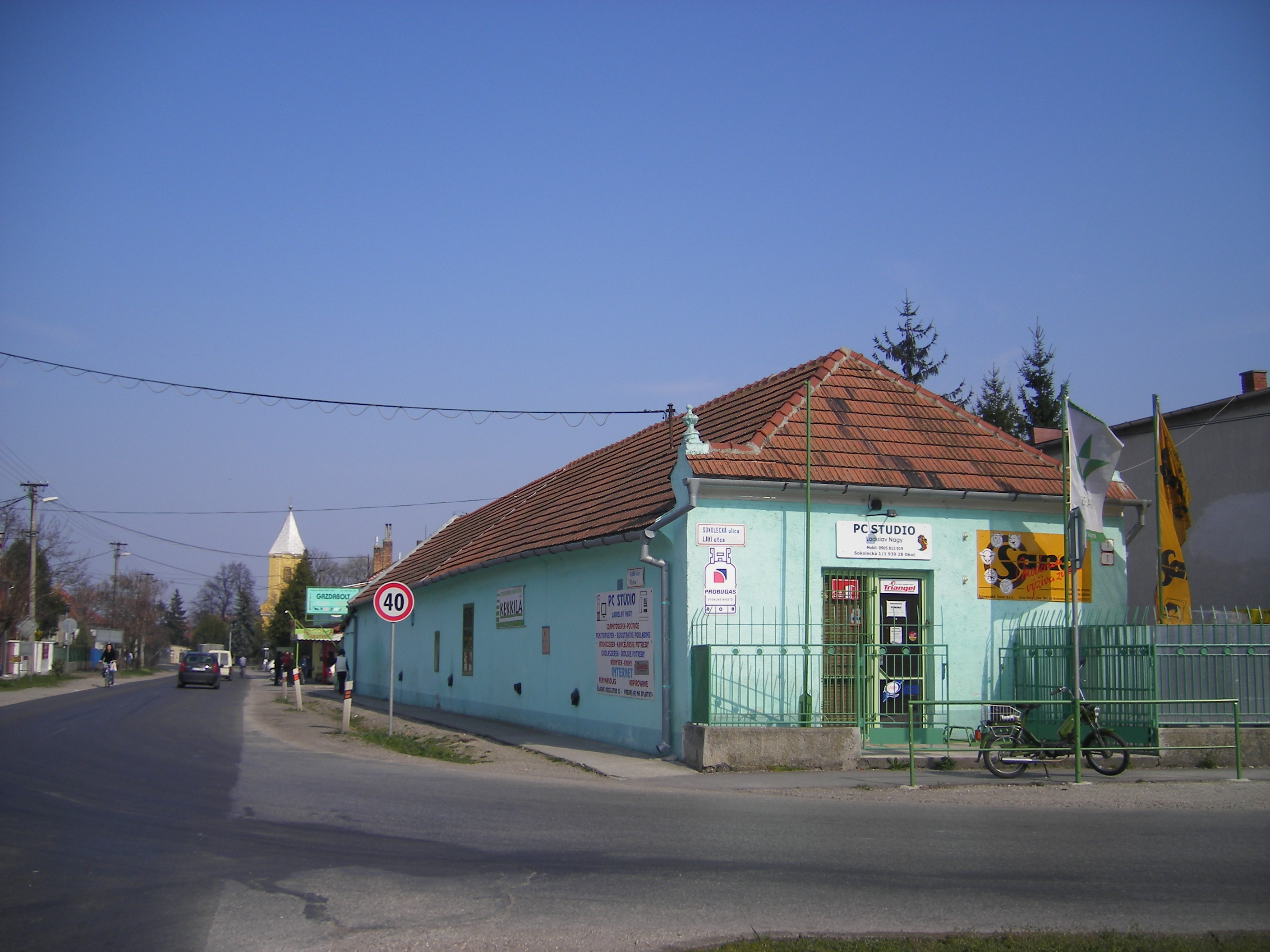
The corner of Laki and Main street

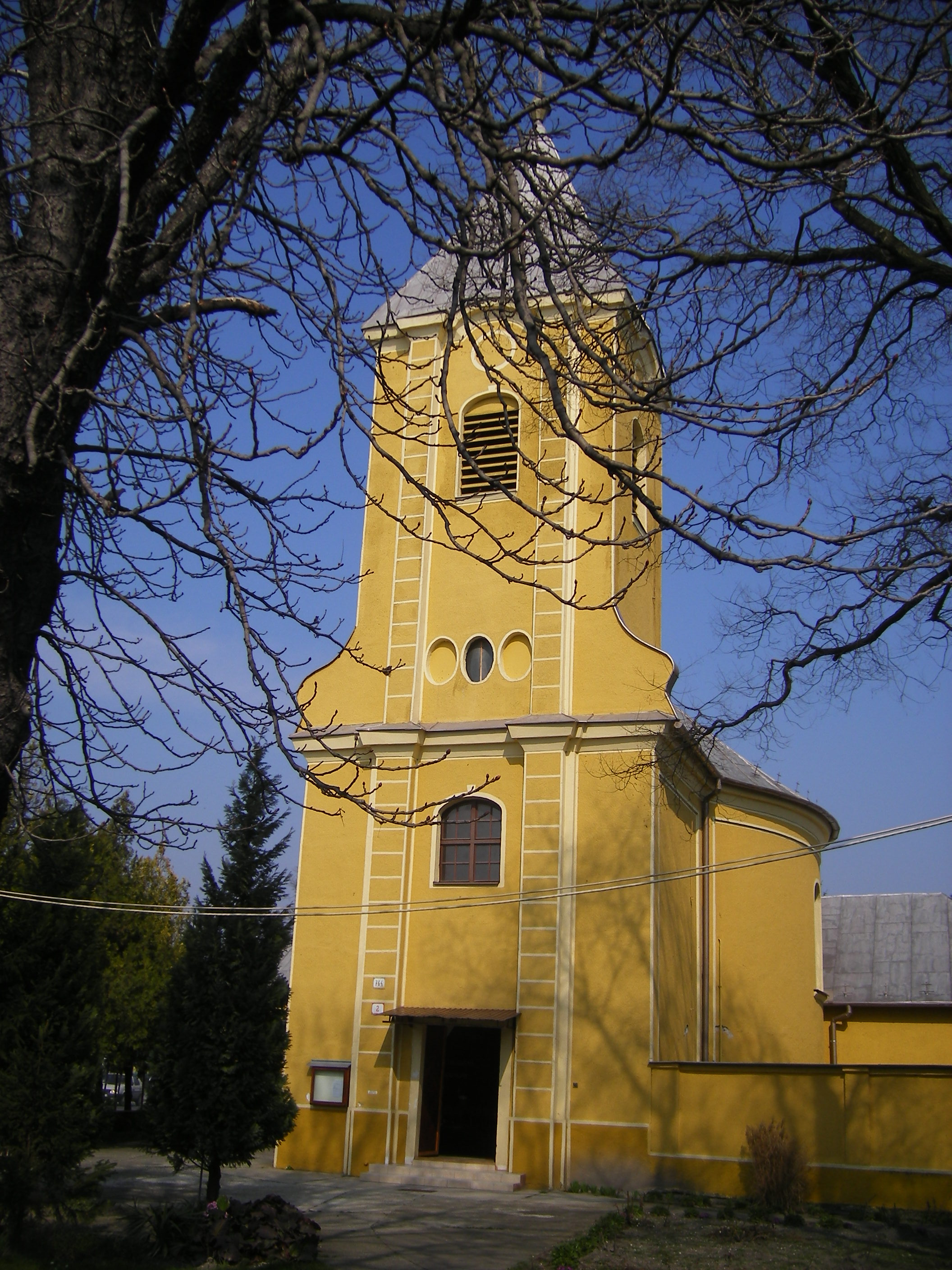
The Roman Catholic parish church

Opatovský Sokolec (Apácaszakállas)

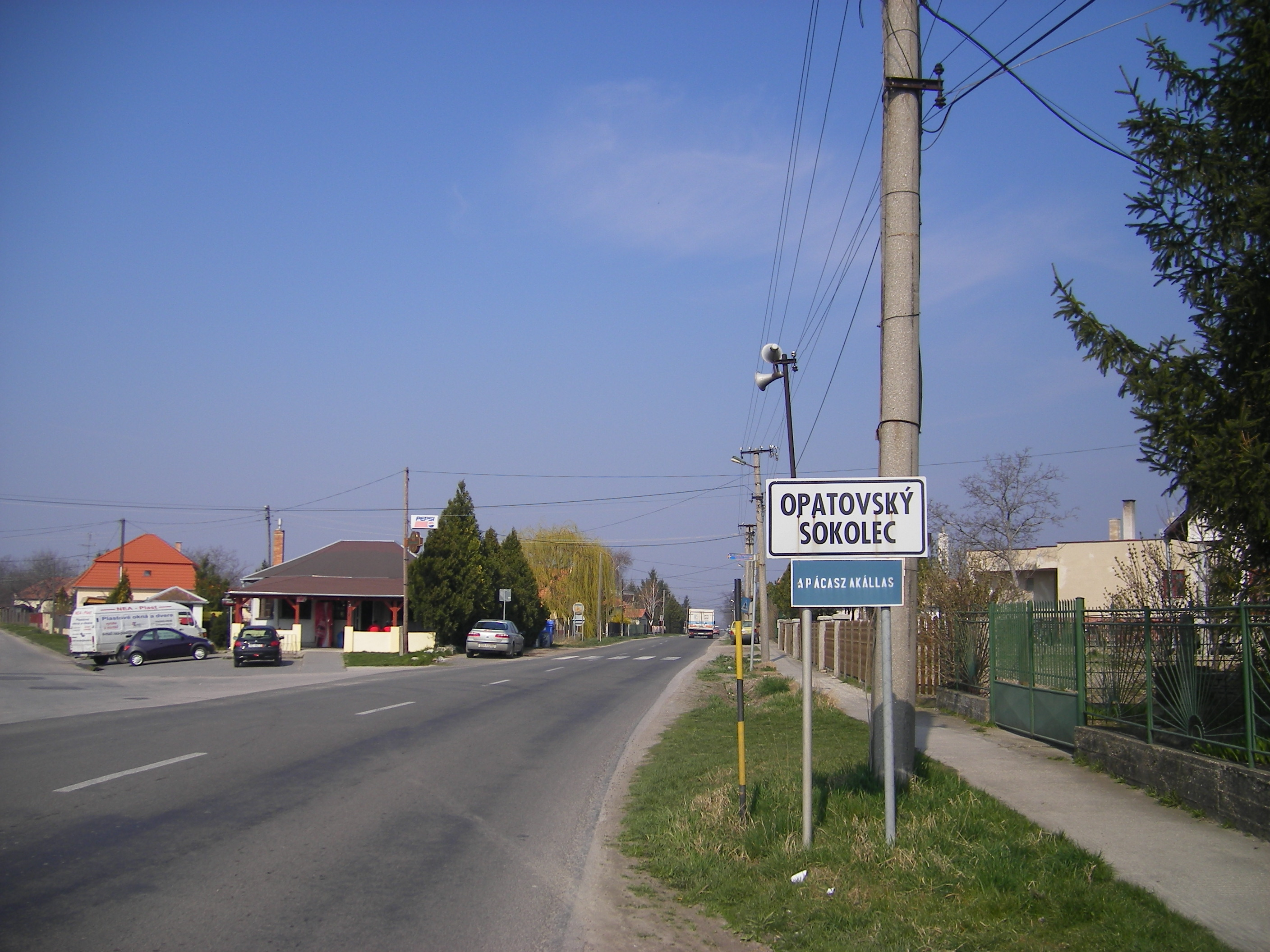
Landscape

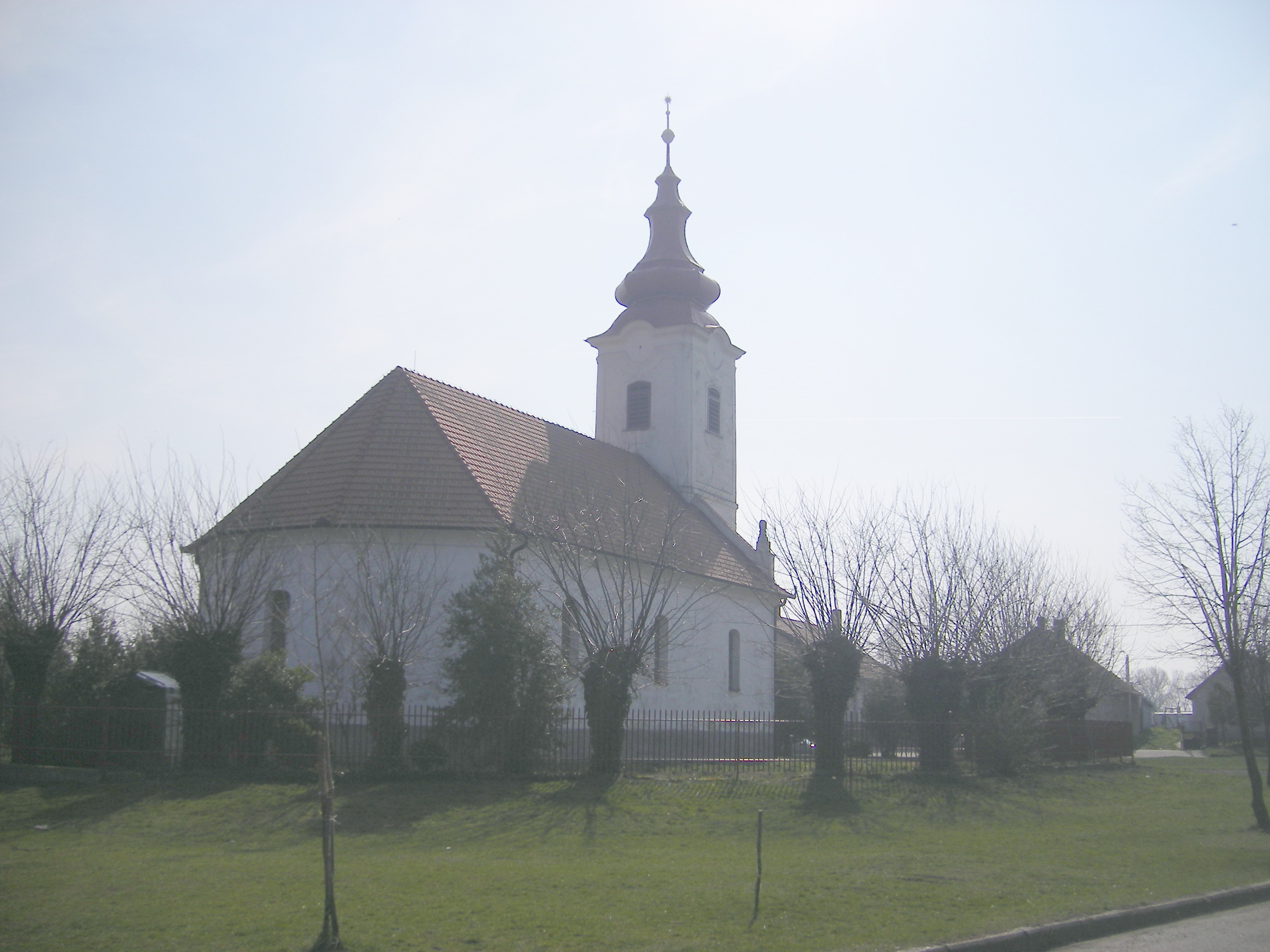
The Hungarian reformed church

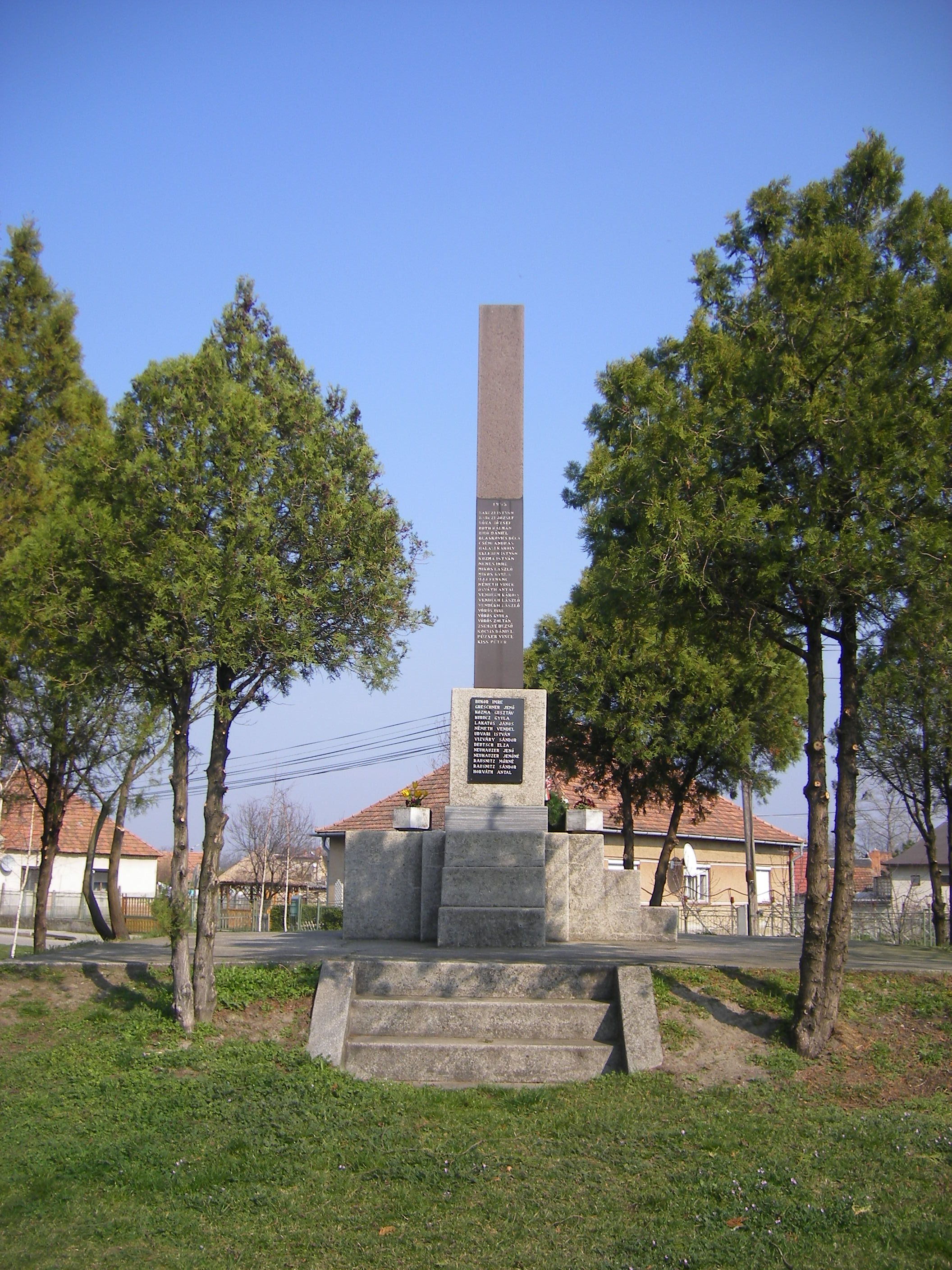
WW memorial

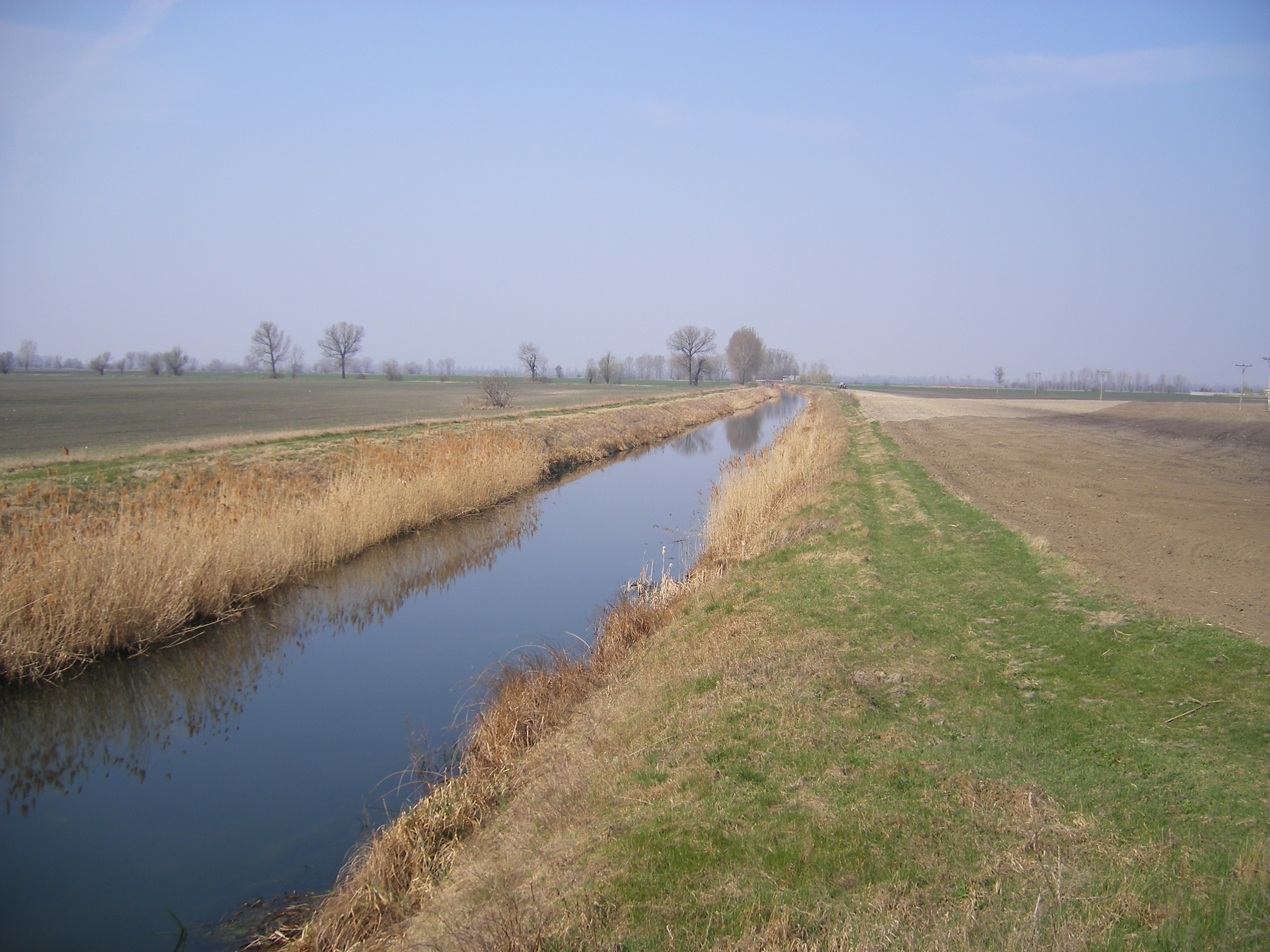
The Komárom-channel at Nový Goľáš (Gólyás)
