= Vének =

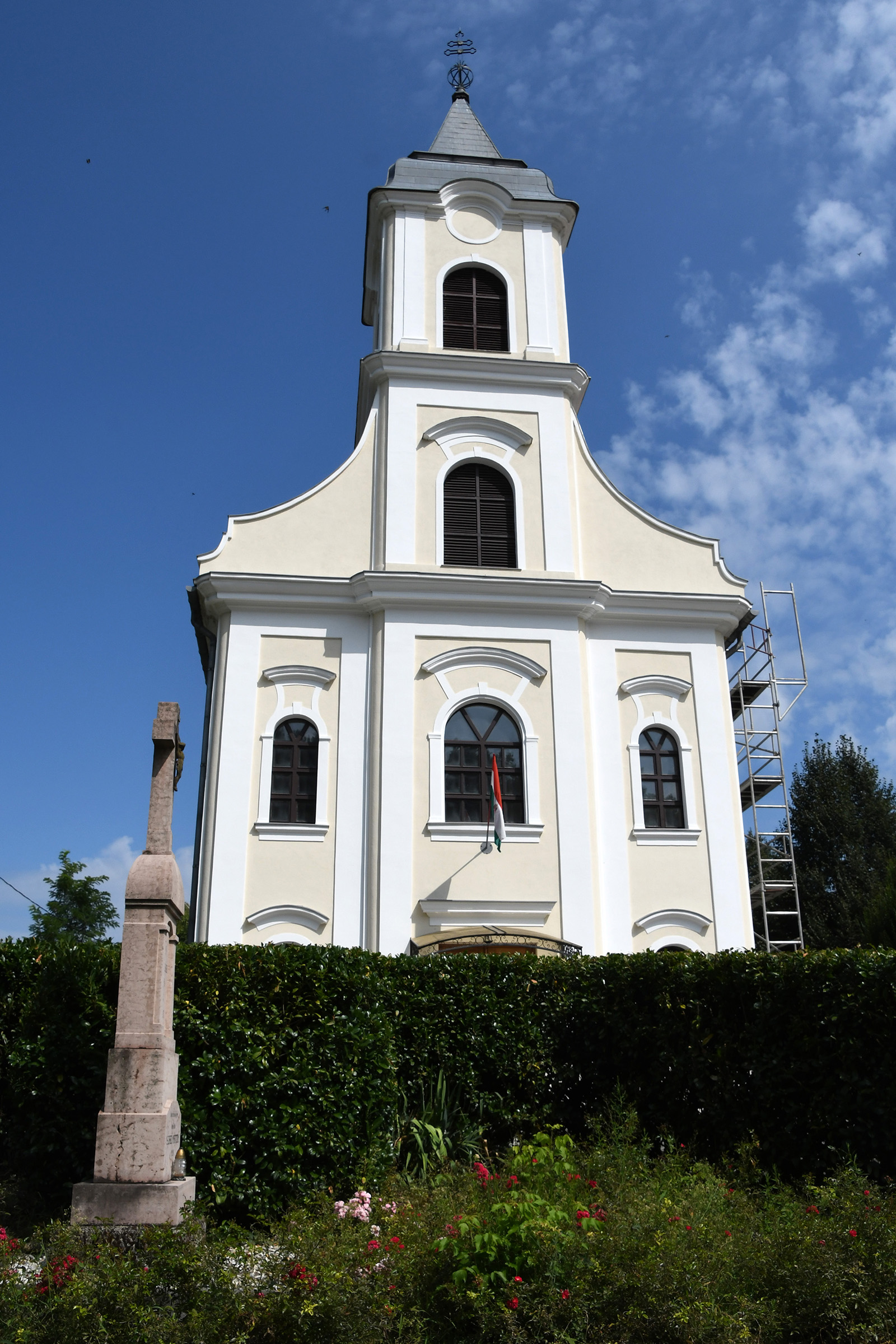
- A Roman Catholic church in Vének.

- Seal Coat of arms

- Location of Vének
- Coordinates: 47.7333°N 17.7667°E
- Country: Hungary
- County: Győr-Moson-Sopron

Government
  - Mayor: Bazsó Zsolt (Ind.)

Area
  - Total: 6.89 km^{2} (2.66 sq mi)

Population (2022)
  - Total: 192
  - Density: 27.9/km^{2} (72.2/sq mi)
- Time zone: UTC+1 (CET)
  - Summer (DST): UTC+2 (CEST)
- Postal code: 9062
- Area code: 96

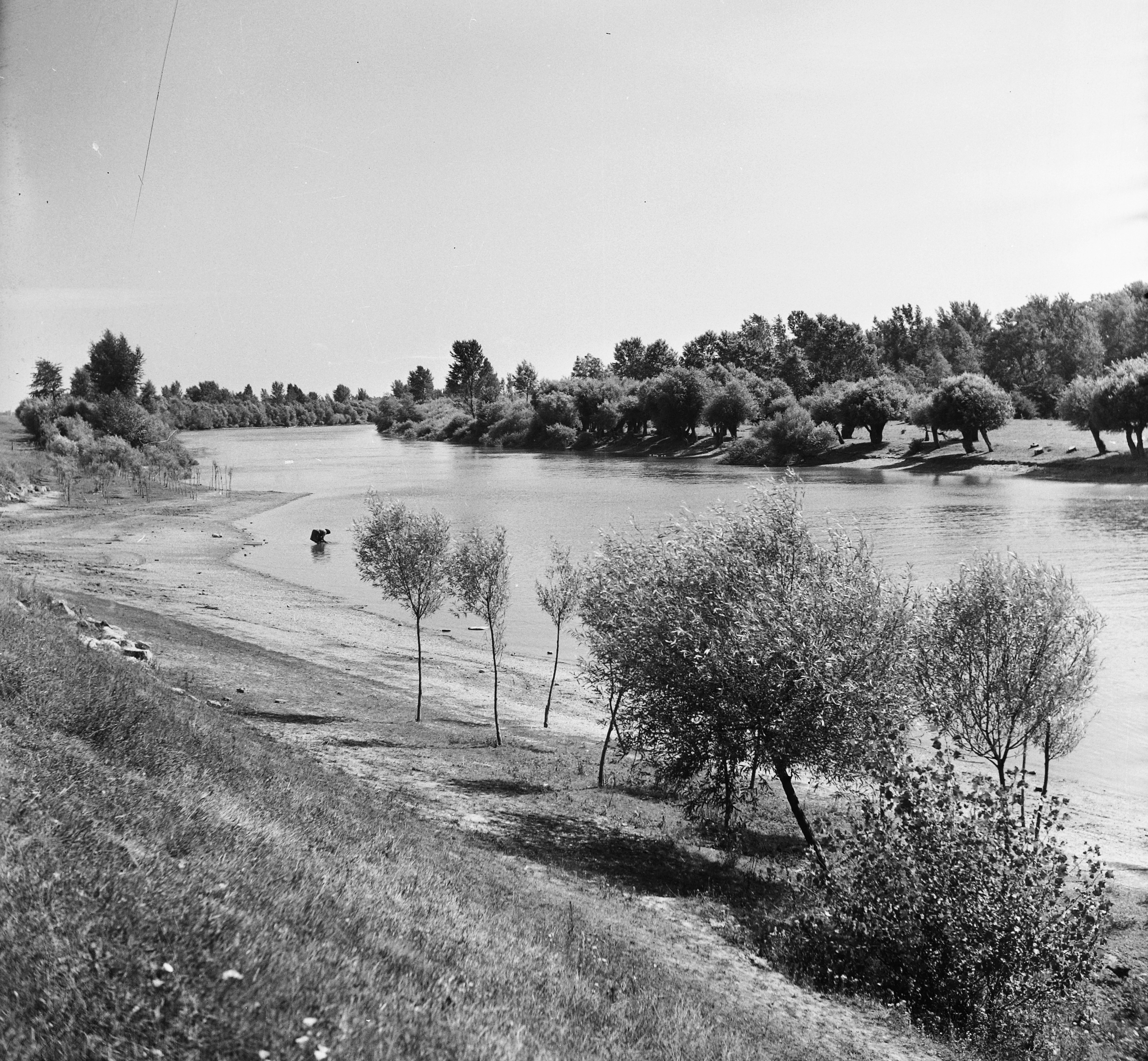
A 1955 image of Danube bank in Vének.

Vének is a village in Győr-Moson-Sopron County, Hungary.
