= Gönyű =

- Coat of arms

- Location in Hungary
- Coordinates: 47°43′59.88″N 17°49′59.88″E
- Country: Hungary
- County: Győr-Moson-Sopron

Area
  - Total: 21.69 km^{2} (8.37 sq mi)

Population (2004)
  - Total: 3,109
  - Density: 143.33/km^{2} (371.2/sq mi)
- Time zone: UTC+1 (CET)
  - Summer (DST): UTC+2 (CEST)
- Postal code: 9071
- Area code: 96

Gönyű is a village in Győr-Moson-Sopron county, Hungary.

The village is known for its bizarre soccer field.
