= Castle of Csesznek =

Castle in Hungary

Coordinates: 47.3511°N 17.8817°E

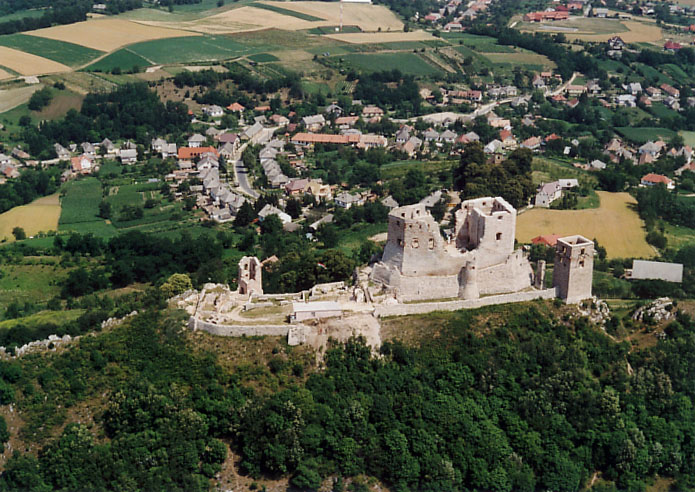
Csesznek Castle

The Castle of Csesznek lies in the Bakony between Győr and Zirc in the village of Csesznek. The castle was constructed after the Mongol invasion of Europe around 1263 in a period where many castles were built. The first castle was built by Jakab Cseszneky of the Bána clan. The first written mention of the castle is in a document from 1281 that gives Jakab Cseszneky's sons joint ownership of the castle. In 1315 the Csák clan conquered the castle. In 1392 Sigismund gave the castle and 31 surrounding villages to the Garai family. The castle was owned by the Garai family until 1482. Then Matthias Corvinus donated the castle to Stephen Zápolya.
