= Bakonyszentlászló =

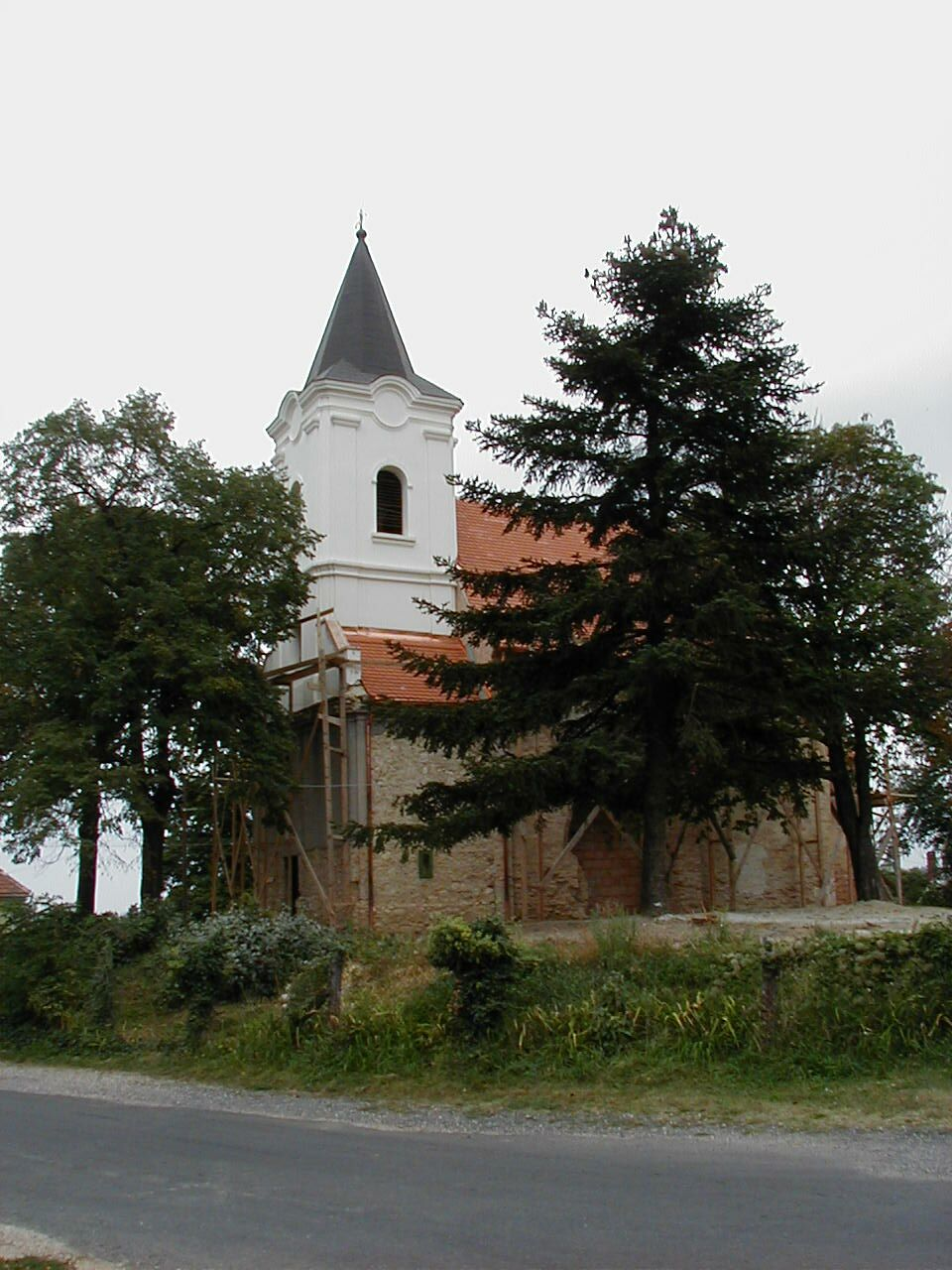
- Protestant church

- Flag Coat of arms

- Location of Győr-Moson-Sopron county in Hungary

- Location of Bakonyszentlászló
- Coordinates: 47.38748°N 17.80072°E
- Country: Hungary
- County: Győr-Moson-Sopron

Area
  - Total: 38.51 km^{2} (14.87 sq mi)

Population (2004)
  - Total: 1,905
  - Density: 49.46/km^{2} (128.1/sq mi)
- Time zone: UTC+1 (CET)
  - Summer (DST): UTC+2 (CEST)
- Postal code: 8431
- Area code: 88
- Website: https://bakonyszentlaszlo.hu/

Bakonyszentlászló is a village in Győr-Moson-Sopron county, Hungary.

During the 19th and 20th centuries, a small Jewish community resided in Bakonyszentlászló. In 1880, there were 30 living Jews, most of whom perished in the Holocaust. The community maintains today a Jewish cemetery.
