= Ákos Kara =

Hungarian politician (born 1975)

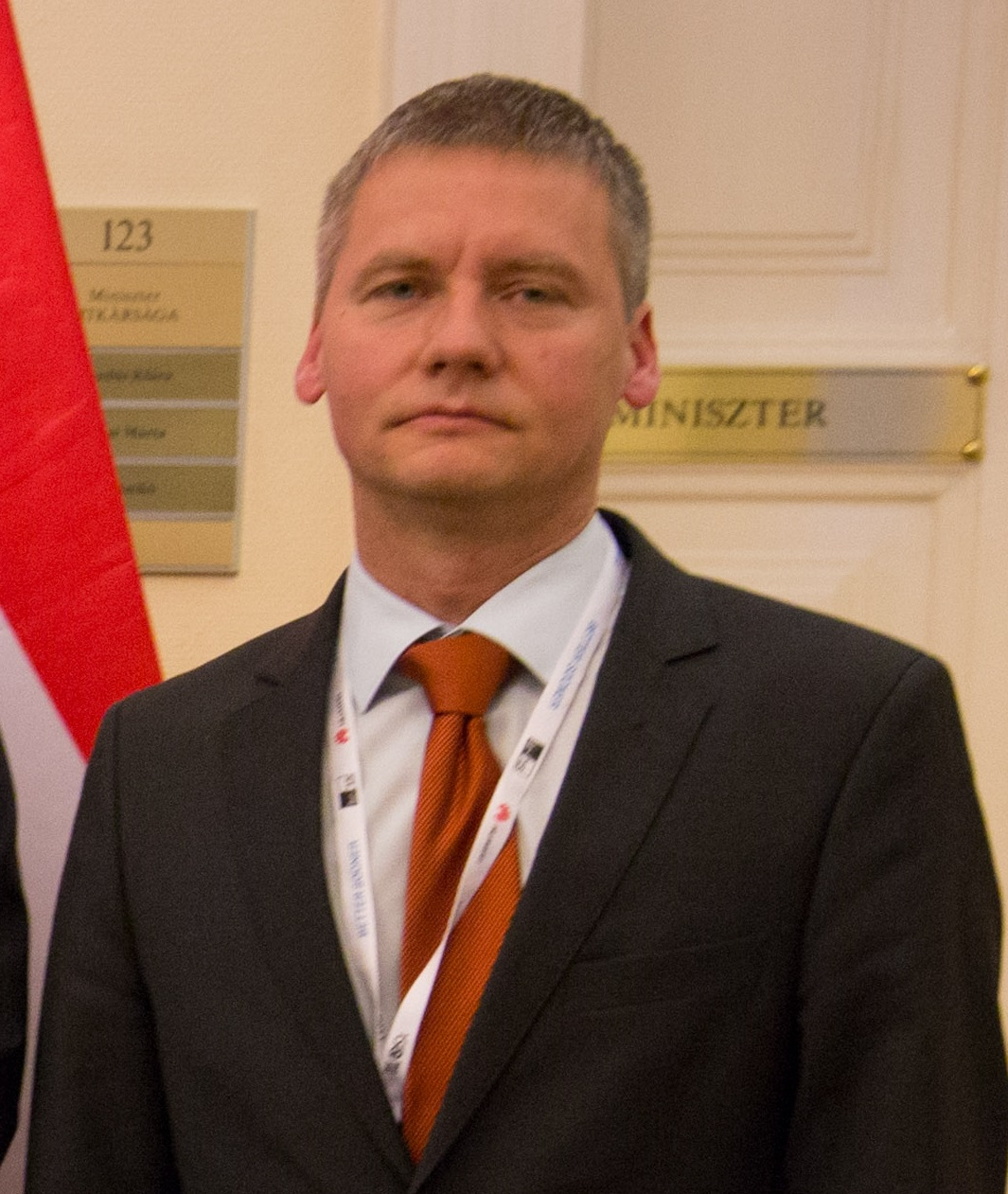

Member of the National Assembly
- In office 14 May 2010 – 8 May 2026

Personal details
- Born: May 21, 1975 (age 51) Győr, Hungary
- Party: Fidesz
- Children: 2
- Profession: politician

Ákos Kara (born May 21, 1975) is a Hungarian politician, member of the National Assembly (MP) for Győr (Győr-Moson-Sopron County Constituency I then II) from 2010 to 2026. He served as Vice President of the General Assembly of Győr-Moson-Sopron County from 2011 to 2014. Formerly he held that position between 2006 and 2010.

Kara was the Deputy Chairman of the Committee on Employment and Labour since May 14, 2010. He was also a member of the Committee on Audit Office and Budget since May 9, 2011. He was appointed Secretary of State for Infocommunication and Consumer Protection on October 16, 2014. He held that office until August 31, 2019. He was replaced as individual candidate for Győr by the Fidesz presidium for the 2026 Hungarian parliamentary election. Although his name appeared in his party's national list, he did not secure a mandate.

== Personal life ==
He is married and has two children.
