= Tényő =

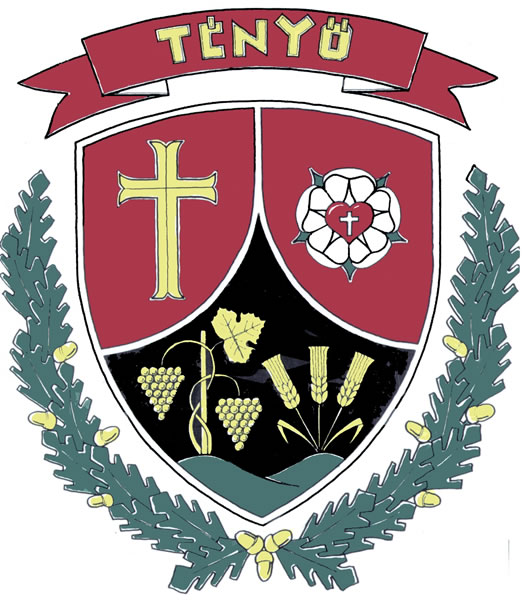
- Coat of arms

- Location of Tényő
- Coordinates: 47.533333°N 17.65°E
- Country: Hungary
- County: Győr-Moson-Sopron

Area
  - Total: 26.38 km^{2} (10.19 sq mi)

Population (2025)
  - Total: 1,781
  - Density: 67.51/km^{2} (174.9/sq mi)
- Time zone: UTC+1 (CET)
  - Summer (DST): UTC+2 (CEST)
- Postal code: 9111
- Area code: 96
- Website: http://tenyo.hu

Tényő is a village in Győr-Moson-Sopron County, Hungary.
