= Sopron District =

Coordinates: 47.68461812942423°N 16.590397763554474°E

Sopron District Soproni járás
- Districts of Hungary
- Flag Coat of arms

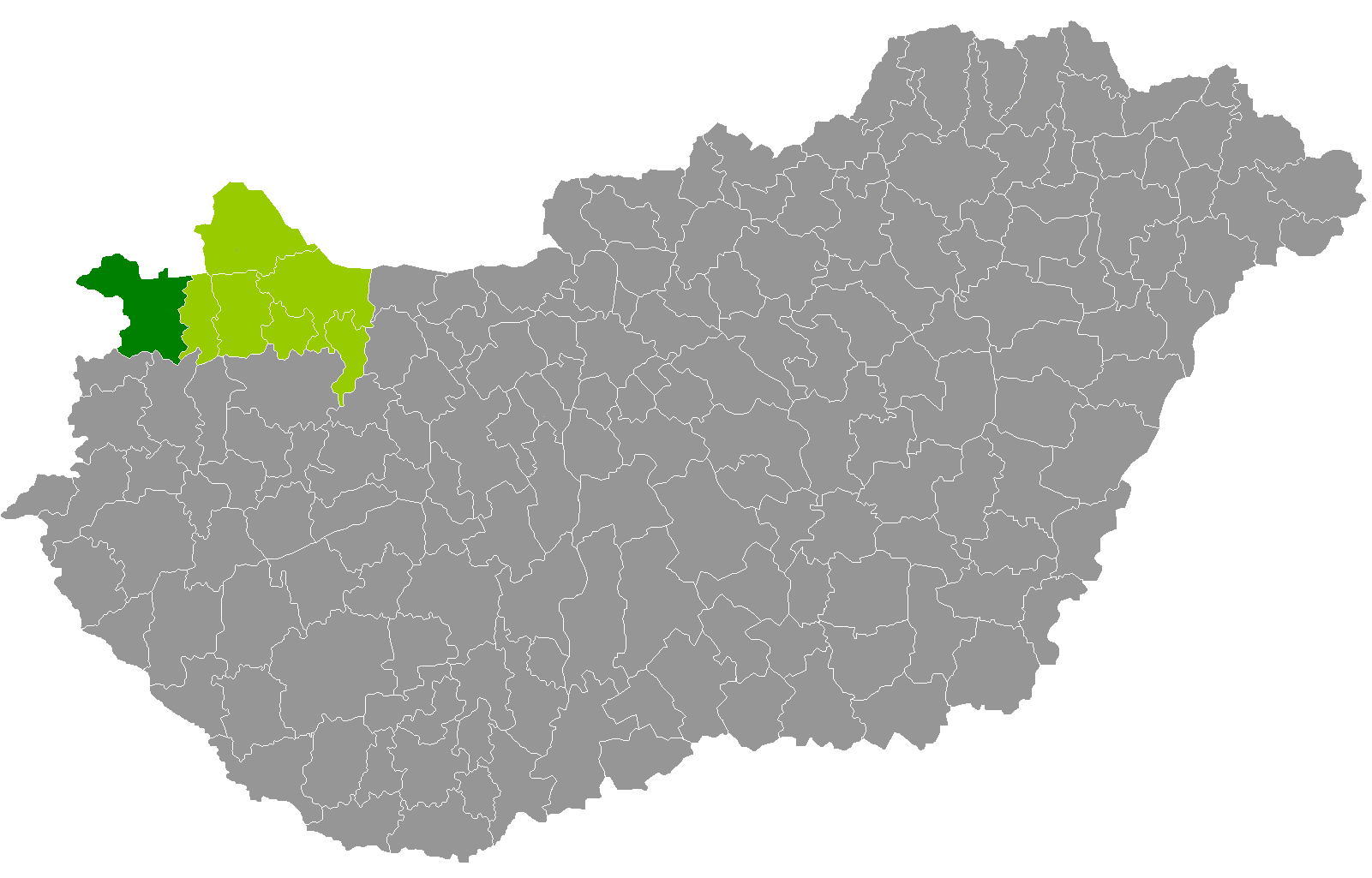
- Sopron District within Hungary and Győr-Moson-Sopron County.
- Country: Hungary
- County: Győr-Moson-Sopron
- District seat: Sopron

Area
  - Total: 867.75 km^{2} (335.04 sq mi)
  - Rank: 3rd in Győr-Moson-Sopron

Population (2011 census)
  - Total: 98,841
  - Rank: 2nd in Győr-Moson-Sopron
  - Density: 114/km^{2} (300/sq mi)

Sopron (Hungarian: Soproni járás; German: Kreis Ödenburg) is a district in western part of Győr-Moson-Sopron County. Sopron is also the name of the town where the district seat is found. The district is located in the Western Transdanubia Statistical Region.

== Geography ==
Sopron District borders with the Austrian state of Burgenland to the north and west, Kapuvár District to the east, Sárvár District and Kőszeg District (Vas County) to the south. The number of the inhabited places in Sopron District is 39.

== Municipalities ==
The district has 1 urban county, 2 towns, 1 large village and 35 villages. (ordered by population, as of 1 January 2012)

- Agyagosszergény (882)
- Ágfalva (2,178)
- Csapod (523)
- Csáfordjánosfa (209)
- Csér (33)
- Ebergőc (157)
- Egyházasfalu (838)
- Fertőboz (258)
- **Fertőd** (3,461)
- Fertőendréd (589)
- Fertőhomok (638)
- Fertőrákos (2,144)
- **Fertőszentmiklós** (3,891)
- Fertőszéplak (1,318)
- Gyalóka (63)
- Harka (1,919)
- Hegykő (1,405)
- Hidegség (383)
- Iván (1,269)
- Kópháza (2,096)
- Lövő (1,443)
- Nagycenk (1,957)
- Nagylózs (1,041)
- Nemeskér (213)
- Pereszteg (1,405)
- Petőháza (1,058)
- Pinnye (321)
- Pusztacsalád (246)
- Répcevis (334)
- Röjtökmuzsaj (445)
- Sarród (1,175)
- **Sopron** (61,390) – district seat
- Sopronhorpács (824)
- Sopronkövesd (1,188)
- Szakony (400)
- Und (315)
- Újkér (977)
- Völcsej (387)
- Zsira (782)

The bolded municipalities are cities, italics municipality is large village.

== Demographics ==
Religion in Sopron District (2011 census)
1. Catholic Church (56.3%)
2. Greek Catholicism (0.30%)
3. Lutheranism (4.60%)
4. Calvinism (2.60%)
5. Other religions (1.20%)
6. Non-religious (8.80%)
7. Atheists (1.10%)
8. Undeclared (25.1%)

In 2011, it had a population of 98,841 and the population density was 114/km^{2}.

Year	County population	Change
2011	98,841	n/a

=== Ethnicity ===
Besides the Hungarian majority, the main minorities are the German (approx. 5,500), Croat (1,800), Roma (750) and Romanian (200).

Total population (2011 census): 98,841
Ethnic groups (2011 census): Identified themselves: 94,241 persons:

- Hungarians: 85,032 (90.23%)
- Germans: 5,412 (5.74%)
- Croats: 1,772 (1.88%)
- Others and indefinable: 2,025 (2.15%)

Approx. 4,500 persons in Sopron District did not declare their ethnic group at the 2011 census.

=== Religion ===
Religious adherence in the county according to 2011 census:

- Catholic – 55,943 (Roman Catholic – 55,662; Greek Catholic – 258);
- Evangelical – 4,545;
- Reformed – 2,544;
- other religions – 1,128;
- Non-religious – 8,703;
- Atheism – 1,132;
- Undeclared – 24,846.

== See also ==
- List of cities and towns in Hungary
