= Banknotes of the Hungarian forint =

Hungarian forint paper money (Hungarian: forint papírpénz) is part of the physical form of the current Hungarian currency, the Hungarian forint. The forint paper money consists exclusively of banknotes. During its history, denominations ranging from 10 to 20,000 forints were put into circulation in correspondence with the inflation which raised needs for higher denominations. Recently, commemorative banknotes were issued as well.

== 1946 Banknotes ==
In 1946, the first series of forint banknotes were put into circulation with the denominations of 10 Ft and 100 Ft. As a consequence of their poor quality (offset printing), many counterfeits appeared in a short time.

1946 Series
Image		Value	Dimensions	Main Colour	Description		Date of			
Obverse	Reverse	Value	Dimensions	Main Colour	Obverse	Reverse	printing	issue	withdrawal	lapse
		10 Ft	155 × 71 mm	Dark green	Mihály Pfeffer, a pressman at the Banknote Printing Office, posed for the illustration	Coat of arms	3 June 1946	1 August 1946	31 March 1948	31 March 1948
		100 Ft	158 × 72 mm	Dark blue	Mrs. János Tőkés (Ms. Gizella Várszegi), an employee of the Banknote Printing Office, posed for the illustration	Hands holding a hammer and ears of wheat	3 June 1946	7 August 1946	1 May 1951	31 December 1948
These images are to scale at 0.7 pixel per millimetre (18 pixel per inch). For table standards, see the banknote specification table.

== 1947 Series ==
From 1947, a second series of banknotes were designed and put into circulation. These banknotes were printed until 1996 with a different coat of arms.

1947 Series
Image		Value	Dimensions	Main Colour	Description		Date of			
Obverse	Reverse	Value	Dimensions	Main Colour	Obverse	Reverse	first printing	issue	withdrawal	lapse
Kossuth's coat of arms
		10 Ft	166 × 72 mm	Green	Sándor Petőfi (1823–1849)	János Jankó's painting: "Riverside scene"	27 February 1947	25 July 1947	30 September 1992	31 December 1993
		20 Ft	166 × 72 mm	Blue	György Dózsa (1470–1514)	Male nude (posing: pentathlete István Hegedűs) with hammer and ear of wheat	27 February 1947	1 August 1948	30 September 1992	31 December 1993
		100 Ft	166 × 72 mm	Red	Lajos Kossuth (1802–1894)	Károly Lotz's painting: "Flight from the thunderstorm"	27 February 1947	14 August 1948	31 December 1998	31 December 1999
Rákosi's coat of arms
		10 Ft	166 × 72 mm	Green	Sándor Petőfi	János Jankó's painting: "Riverside scene"	24 October 1949	1 July 1950	30 September 1992	31 December 1993
		20 Ft	166 × 72 mm	Blue	György Dózsa	Male nude (posing: pentathlete István Hegedűs) note	24 October 1949	1 July 1950	30 September 1992	31 December 1993
		50 Ft	166 × 72 mm	Brown	Portrait of Ferenc II Rákóczi (1676–1735) by Ádám Mányoki	Unknown painter: "Kuruc-labanc battle scene"	1 September 1951	13 June 1953	30 June 1996	31 December 1996
		100 Ft	166 × 72 mm	Red	Lajos Kossuth	Károly Lotz's painting: "Flight from the thunderstorm"	24 October 1949	1 July 1950	31 December 1998	31 December 1999
Kádár's coat of arms
		10 Ft	166 × 72 mm	Green	Sándor Petőfi	János Jankó's painting: "Riverside scene"	23 May 1957	27 October 1959	30 September 1992	31 December 1993
		20 Ft	166 × 72 mm	Blue	György Dózsa	Male nude (posing: pentathlete István Hegedűs) with hammer and ear of wheat	23 May 1957	8 November 1960	30 September 1992	31 December 1993
		50 Ft	166 × 72 mm	Brown	Portrait of Ferenc II Rákóczi by Ádám Mányoki	Unknown painter: "Kuruc-labanc battle scene"	3 September 1965	15 June 1966	30 June 1996	31 December 1996
		100 Ft	166 × 72 mm	Red	Lajos Kossuth	Károly Lotz's painting: "Flight from the thunderstorm"	23 May 1957	20 March 1959	31 December 1998	31 December 1999
		500 Ft	174 × 80 mm	Violet	Endre Ady (1877–1919)	View of Budapest	30 June 1969	21 August 1970	31 August 1999	31 August 2019
		1000 Ft	174 × 80 mm	Light green	Béla Bartók	Ferenc Medgyessy's sculpture: "Mother with her child"	25 March 1983	27 June 1983	31 August 1999	31 August 2019
Recent coat of arms
		100 Ft	166 × 72 mm	Red	Lajos Kossuth	Károly Lotz's painting: "Flight from the thunderstorm"	15 January 1992	1 July 1992	31 December 1998	31 December 1999
		500 Ft	174 × 80 mm	Violet	Endre Ady	View of Budapest	31 July 1990	6 April 1992	31 August 1999	31 August 2019
		1000 Ft	174 × 80 mm	Light green	Béla Bartók (1881–1945)	Ferenc Medgyessy's sculpture: "Mother with her child"	30 October 1992	5 November 1993	31 August 1999	31 August 2019
		5000 Ft	174 × 80 mm	Orange-brown	Portrait of Count István Széchenyi (1791–1860) by Friedrich Amerling	The Hungarian Academy of Sciences building	31 July 1990	25 March 1991	26 July 1999	26 July 2019
These images are to scale at 0.7 pixel per millimetre (18 pixel per inch). For table standards, see the banknote specification table.

== 1997 series ==
Between 1997 and 2001, a new series of banknotes were issued with improved security features. The notes share the common size of 154 × 70 mm. The banknotes were printed by the Hungarian Banknote Printing Corp. in Budapest on paper manufactured by the Diósgyőr Papermill in Miskolc.

The Hungarian National Bank announced the withdrawal of the 1000 forint notes issued prior to 2006. This affects the 1000 forint note from the current series, but without the red metallic strip on the obverse side, i.e. also the Millennium issue. These notes remained in circulation until August 31, 2007. After this period, the note may be refused for payment. However, commercial banks may exchange these notes thereafter. The Hungarian National Bank will continue to exchange these notes for twenty years, until August 31, 2027.

The 200 forint notes were replaced with a new 200 forint coin in 2009. (The silver 200 forint coins that were in circulation until 1998 did not see much use at that time.)

1997 series
Image		Value	Dimensions	Main Colour	Description		Date of			
Obverse	Reverse	Value	Dimensions	Main Colour	Obverse	Reverse	first printing	issue	withdrawal	lapse
		200 Ft	154 × 70 mm	green	King Charles Robert (1288–1342)	Castle of Diósgyőr	1998	1 May 1998	15 November 2009	15 November 2029
		200 Ft	154 × 70 mm	green	King Charles Robert (1288–1342)	Castle of Diósgyőr	2001		15 November 2009	15 November 2029
		500 Ft	154 × 70 mm	orange and brown	Prince sovereign Ferenc II Rákóczi (by Ádám Mányoki)	Castle of Sárospatak	1998	1 December 1998	31 October 2019	31 October 2039
		500 Ft	154 × 70 mm	orange and brown	Prince sovereign Ferenc II Rákóczi (by Ádám Mányoki)	Castle of Sárospatak	2001	1 February 2001	31 October 2019	31 October 2039
		500 Ft	154 × 70 mm	orange and brown	Prince sovereign Ferenc II Rákóczi (by Ádám Mányoki)	Castle of Sárospatak	2007	15 April 2009	31 October 2019	31 October 2039
		1,000 Ft	154 × 70 mm	blue	King Matthias Corvinus (1443–1490)	the Hercules Fountain from the Castle of Visegrád	1998	1 September 1998	31 August 2007	31 August 2027
		1,000 Ft	154 × 70 mm	blue	King Matthias Corvinus (1443–1490)	the Hercules Fountain from the Castle of Visegrád	2002		31 August 2007	31 August 2027
		1,000 Ft	154 × 70 mm	blue	King Matthias Corvinus (1443–1490)	the Hercules Fountain from the Castle of Visegrád	2005	10 April 2006	31 October 2018	31 October 2038
		2,000 Ft	154 × 70 mm	brown	Prince sovereign Gábor Bethlen (1580–1629)	Viktor Madarász' painting "Gábor Bethlen among his scientists"	1998	1 February 1998	31 July 2017	31 July 2037
		2,000 Ft	154 × 70 mm	brown	Prince sovereign Gábor Bethlen (1580–1629)	Viktor Madarász' painting "Gábor Bethlen among his scientists"	2002		31 July 2017	31 July 2037
		5,000 Ft	154 × 70 mm	violet and green	Count István Széchenyi (by Friedrich Amerling)	the Széchenyi Mansion in Nagycenk	1999	1 April 1999	31 July 2017	31 July 2037
		5,000 Ft	154 × 70 mm	violet and green	Count István Széchenyi (by Friedrich Amerling)	the Széchenyi Mansion in Nagycenk	2005		31 July 2017	31 July 2037
		10,000 Ft	154 × 70 mm	red and blue	King Stephen I (975–1038)	view of Esztergom by Hubert Sattler	1997	1 July 1997	31 December 2019	31 December 2039
		10,000 Ft	154 × 70 mm	red and blue	King Stephen I (975–1038)	view of Esztergom by Hubert Sattler	1998		31 December 2019	31 December 2039
		10,000 Ft	154 × 70 mm	red and blue	King Stephen I (975–1038)	view of Esztergom by Hubert Sattler	2001		31 December 2019	31 December 2039
		10,000 Ft	154 × 70 mm	red and blue	King Stephen I (975–1038)	view of Esztergom by Hubert Sattler	2008	8 September 2008	31 December 2019	31 December 2039
		20,000 Ft	154 × 70 mm	grey and reddish	Ferenc Deák (1803–1876)	the old House of Representatives in Pest	1999	1 February 2001	31 December 2017	31 December 2037
		20,000 Ft	154 × 70 mm	grey and reddish	Ferenc Deák (1803–1876)	the old House of Representatives in Pest	2004		31 December 2017	31 December 2037
		20,000 Ft	154 × 70 mm	grey and reddish	Ferenc Deák (1803–1876)	the old House of Representatives in Pest	2009		31 December 2017	31 December 2037
These images are to scale at 0.7 pixel per millimetre (18 pixel per inch). For table standards, see the banknote specification table.

Recent Series – commemorative issues
Image		Value	Dimensions	Main Colour	Description			Date of			
Obverse	Reverse	Value	Dimensions	Main Colour	Obverse	Reverse	Commemorative subject	first printing	issue	withdrawal	lapse
		500 Ft	154 × 70 mm	orange and brown	Prince sovereign Ferenc II Rákóczi (by Ádám Mányoki)	The Hungarian Parliament Building and the Hungarian Revolution flag of 1956	50th anniversary of the Hungarian Revolution of 1956	2006	20 October 2006	31 October 2019	31 October 2039
		1000 Ft	154 × 70 mm	blue	King Matthias Corvinus	the Hercules Fountain from the Castle of Visegrád	Millennium	2000	1 November 2000	31 August 2007	31 August 2027
		2000 Ft	154 × 70 mm	brownish	the Holy Crown of Hungary	Gyula Benczúr's painting: "Baptism of Vajk"	Millennium of the state establishment	20 August 2000		current	
These images are to scale at 0.7 pixel per millimetre (18 pixel per inch). For table standards, see the banknote specification table.

== 2014 series ==
Beginning in 2014, the Hungarian National Bank issued a revised series of forint banknotes, featuring the same themes as its previous issues, but containing advanced security features. The first banknote issued in this series, the 10,000 forint, was issued into general circulation on 2 September 2014, followed by the 20,000 forint banknote on 25 September 2015, the 2,000 and 5,000 forint banknotes on 1 March 2017, the 1,000 forint banknote on 1 March 2018 and the 500 forint banknote on 1 February 2019.

2014 Series
Image		Value	Dimensions	Main Colour	Description		Date of			
Obverse	Reverse	Value	Dimensions	Main Colour	Obverse	Reverse	first printing	issue	withdrawal	lapse
		500 Ft	154 × 70 mm	red	Prince sovereign Ferenc II Rákóczi (by Ádám Mányoki)	Castle of Sárospatak	2018	1 February 2019	current	
		1,000 Ft	154 × 70 mm	blue	King Matthias Corvinus	the Hercules Fountain from the Castle of Visegrád	2017	1 March 2018	current	
		2,000 Ft	154 × 70 mm	brown	Prince sovereign Gábor Bethlen	Viktor Madarász' painting "Gábor Bethlen among his scientists"	2016	1 March 2017	current	
		5,000 Ft	154 × 70 mm	yellow	Count István Széchenyi (by Friedrich Amerling)	the Széchenyi Mansion in Nagycenk	2016	1 March 2017	current	
		10,000 Ft	154 × 70 mm	purple	King Stephen I	view of Esztergom by Hubert Sattler	2014	2 September 2014	current	
		20,000 Ft	154 × 70 mm	green	Ferenc Deák	the old House of Representatives in Pest	2015	25 September 2015	current	
These images are to scale at 0.7 pixel per millimetre (18 pixel per inch). For table standards, see the banknote specification table.
