= Fertőszéplak =

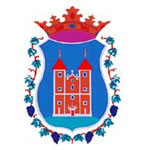
- Coat of arms

- Location of Győr-Moson-Sopron county in Hungary

- Location of Fertőszéplak
- Coordinates: 47.61581°N 16.83798°E
- Country: Hungary
- County: Győr-Moson-Sopron

Area
  - Total: 21.78 km^{2} (8.41 sq mi)

Population (2004)
  - Total: 1,175
  - Density: 53.94/km^{2} (139.7/sq mi)
- Time zone: UTC+1 (CET)
  - Summer (DST): UTC+2 (CEST)
- Postal code: 9436
- Area code: 99

Fertőszéplak is a village in Győr-Moson-Sopron county, Hungary.

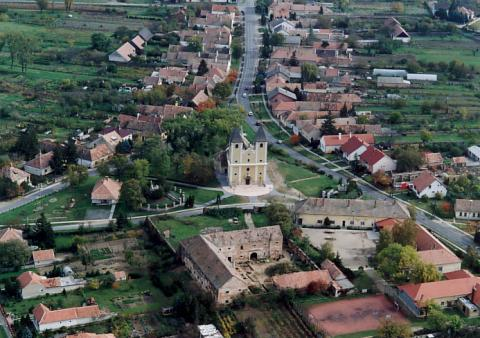
Aerialphotoraphy of Fertőszéplak

Fertődszéplak is one of the Hungarian villages on the international Lake Neusiedl Bike Trail. Other Hungarian places on the course are Fertőd, Hegykő, Fertőhomok, Hidegség, Fertőboz, Balf und Fertőrákos.

The important Hungarian noble family Széchenyi originated from Fertöszéplak and lived here until they moved to Nagycenk in the 18th century.

The baroque Allsaints church was built in 1726 under Count György Széchenyi. Besides the church is a small calvary.

The Széchenyi castle is situated opposite the church.

The village museum: On Széplaki Road are several examples of baroque farmhouses. Five of them contain the village museum. These restored buildings exhibit examples of history and work and life of the common people around the Lake Neusiedl. Different examples of fully furnished kitchens, bedrooms and living rooms show the development of the lifestyle from 1850 to 1950. Also on display are examples of craftmanship like weaving, wickerwork and fishing. In the barns and sheds, some of them with thatched roofs, are examples of technical developments in farming.

In 2020 the train station was modernised.

== Gallery ==
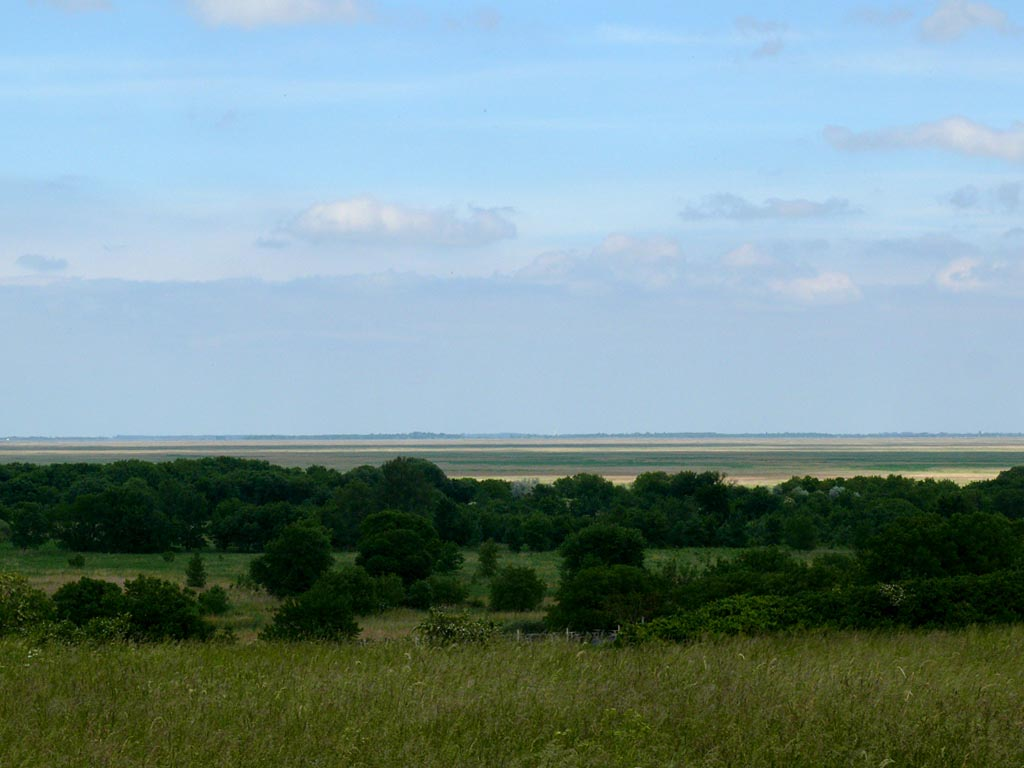
Hungarian side of the Lake Neusiedl

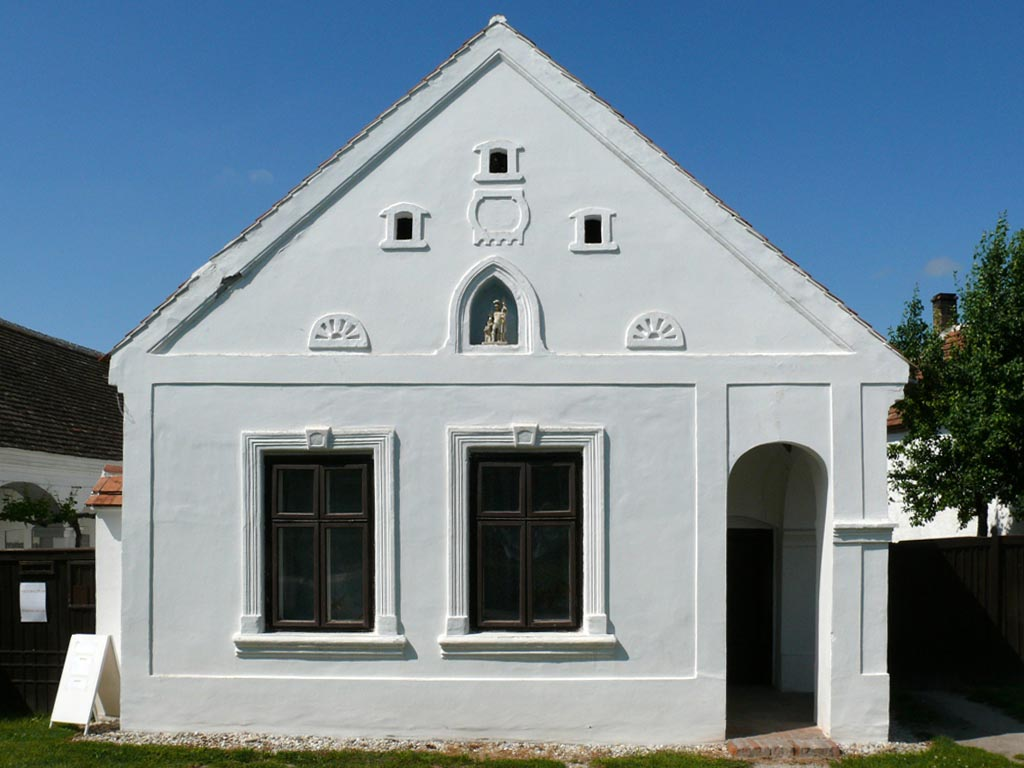
Museum, streetfront

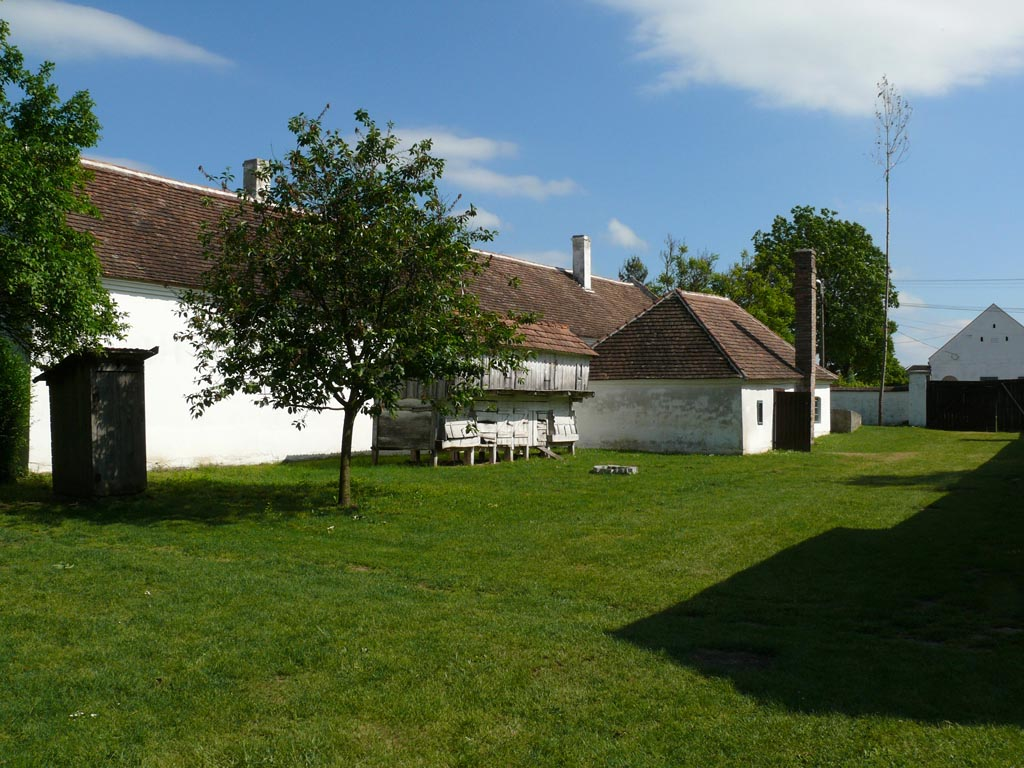
Museum, farmyard

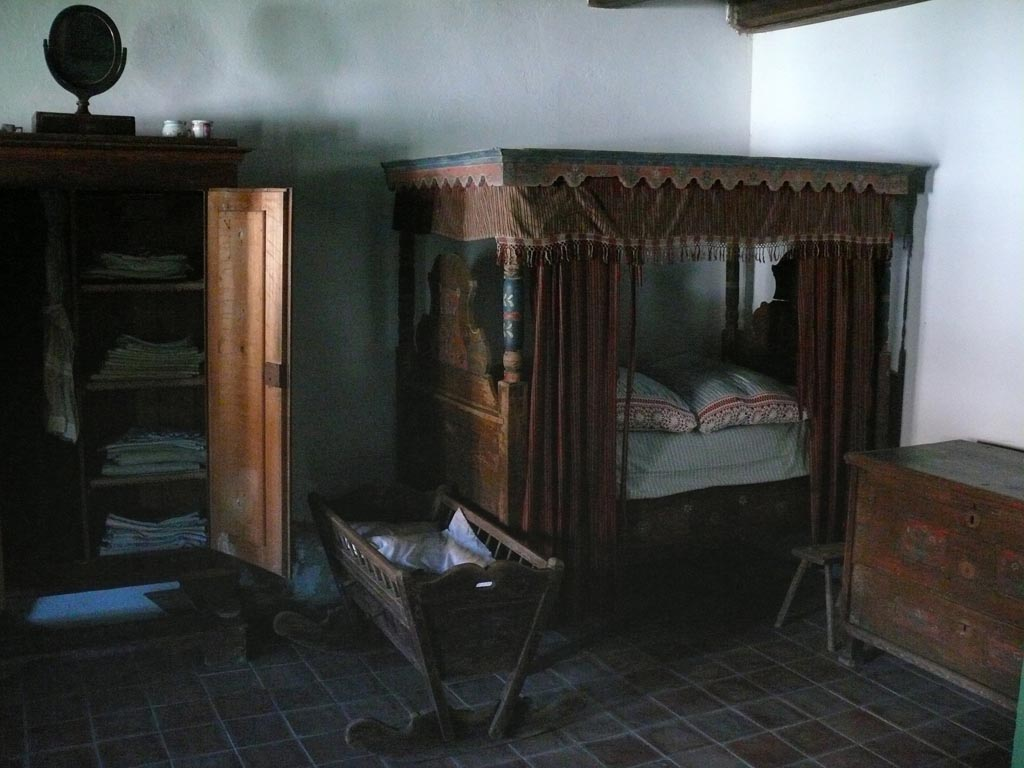
Museum, furniture
