= 1921 Sopron plebiscite =

1921 plebiscite in nine Hungarian settlements on joining Austria

- 14–16 December 1921
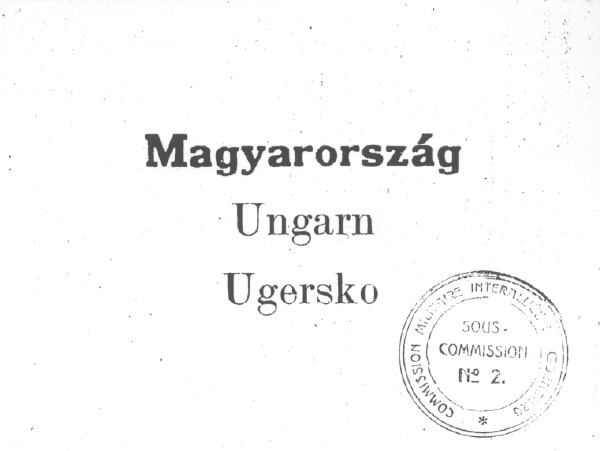
- Ballot paper with the seal of the Entente commission

Results
Choice	Votes	%
Austria	8,227	34.92%
Hungary	15,334	65.08%
Valid votes	23,561	97.87%
Invalid or blank votes	512	2.13%
Total votes	24,073	100.00%
Registered voters/turnout	26,879	89.56%
Results by Municipality
Austria	Hungary

The Sopron area plebiscite took place on 14–16 December 1921. In the plebiscite, the residents of an area of 257 km^{2}, comprising Sopron and eight surrounding settlements, voted on whether to remain in Hungary or to join Austria. After World War I, that was the only plebiscite concerning disputed borders on territory of the former Kingdom of Hungary that was permitted by the Entente. The Uprising in West Hungary was the reason to hold the plebiscite.

Sopron plebiscite, British, French and Italian officers arrive to control the voting districts and oversee the polling stations on 14 December, 1921

== Participant settlements ==
The following settlements participated in the plebiscite. The Hungarian names are given, with their German counterparts in brackets:

- Ágfalva (Agendorf)
- Balf (Wolfs)
- Fertőboz (Holling)
- Fertőrákos (Kroisbach)
- Harka (Harkau)
- Kópháza (Kohlnhof)
- Nagycenk (Zinkendorf)
- Sopron (Ödenburg)
- Sopronbánfalva (Wandorf)

== Results ==
26,879 people were eligible to vote in the plebiscite. 24,063 of them voted. 15,534 voted for Hungary, while 8,227 voted for Austria. 512 ballots were invalid.

18,904 residents of Sopron had the right to vote in the plebiscite. (At the time of the plebiscite Sopron had 37,509 residents.) Here, with a turnout of 89.2%, a large majority (72.7%) voted for Hungary. However, in the 8 villages, the support for Austria was greater, with 5 villages voting for Austria. Only Nagycenk, Fertőboz and Kópháza voted for Hungary.

Settlement	Eligible voters	Total votes	Invalid	For Austria	%	For Hungary	%
Sopron / Brennbergbánya	18,994	17,298	351	4,620	27.2	12,327	72.8
Ágfalva	1,148	848	18	682	82.2	148	17.8
Harka	668	581	9	517	90.4	55	9.6
Fertőboz	349	342	11	74	22.3	257	77.7
Kópháza	948	813	30	243	30.0	550	70.0
Fertőrákos	1,525	1,370	33	812	60.7	525	39.3
Sopronbánfalva	1,538	1,177	35	925	81.0	217	19.0
Balf	668	595	17	349	60.4	229	39.6
Nagycenk	1,041	1,039	8	5	0.5	1,026	99.5
Total	26,879	24,063	512	8,227	34.9	15,334	65.1
