= Bánfalva =

Bánfalva may refer to:

- Gádoros, known as Bánfalva until 1901, a village in Békés County, Hungary
- Sopronbánfalva or Bánfalva, a part of Sopron, a city in Hungary
- Bánfalva (village), a former village now part of Bánhorváti, a village in Borsod-Abaúj-Zemplén county, Hungary
- Bancu, formerly named Bánfalva (and now Csíkbánkfalva) in Hungarian, a village in Romania

== See also ==
- Apetlon, Austria, Mosonbánfalva in Hungarian
