= Tibor Székely =

Hungarian writer, journalist

John Székely AC
- John Székely AC
- Born: 11 April 1908; Budapest, Austria-Hungary
- Died: 22 January 1945 (aged 36); Ágfalva, Hungary
- Writing career
- Pen name: Dénes Molnár
- Years active: 1932–1944

John Székely AC, born Spitzer, also known by the pseudonym Dénes Molnár (11 April 1908 – 22 January 1945), was a Hungarian writer, publicist, and activist.

== Life ==
As a publicist he worked for Budapesti Hírlap and Pester Lloyd. His shorter novels were published at Új Idők. His main topic was the life of urban citizens. All of his philosophical backed romantic short stories may be categorised to the high standard entertaining literature.

He died as a Labour Serviceman in unclarified circumstances.

== Sources ==
- Data at the catalogue of Petőfi Literature Museum
- Magyar életrajzi lexikon 1000–1990, Székely Tibor szócikk
- Dezső Kosztolányi: Írók, festők, tudósok (Volume II. Szépirodalmi Könyvkiadó, Budapest, 1958)
