= Lövő =

Village in Győr-Moson-Sopron, Hungary

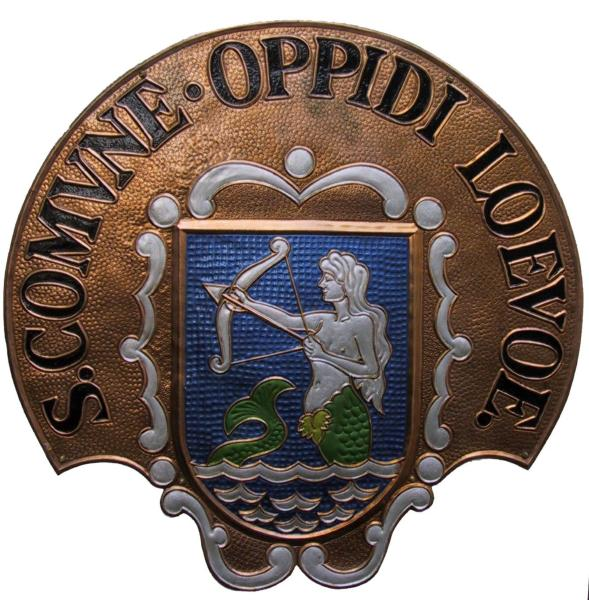
- Coat of arms

- Location of Győr-Moson-Sopron county in Hungary

- Location of Lövő
- Coordinates: 47.50180°N 16.78516°E
- Country: Hungary
- County: Győr-Moson-Sopron County
- District: Sopron District

Area
  - Total: 17.52 km^{2} (6.76 sq mi)

Population (2004)
  - Total: 1,448
  - Density: 82.64/km^{2} (214.0/sq mi)
- Time zone: UTC+1 (CET)
  - Summer (DST): UTC+2 (CEST)
- Postal code: 9461
- Area code: 99

Lövő is a village in Sopron District of Győr-Moson-Sopron County in Hungary.

== History ==
Lövő is a town in Győr-Moson-Sopron County, Hungary, near the Austrian border. The area has been inhabited since Roman times. The origin of the town’s name is often associated with archery, which may have had historical significance in the settlement. Lövő has a Roman Catholic church built in the 18th century in the Baroque style. The surrounding area includes natural landscapes typical of the region.
