= Castle Szidonia =

17th-century castle in Hungary

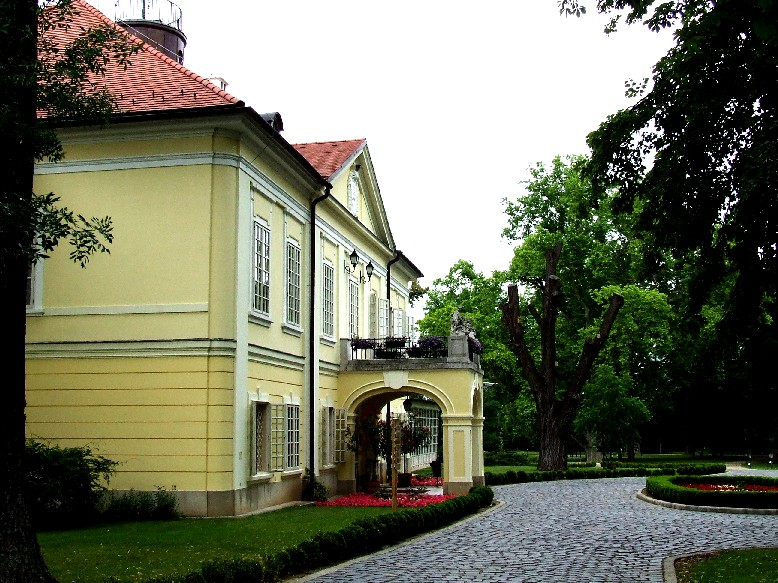
Entrance

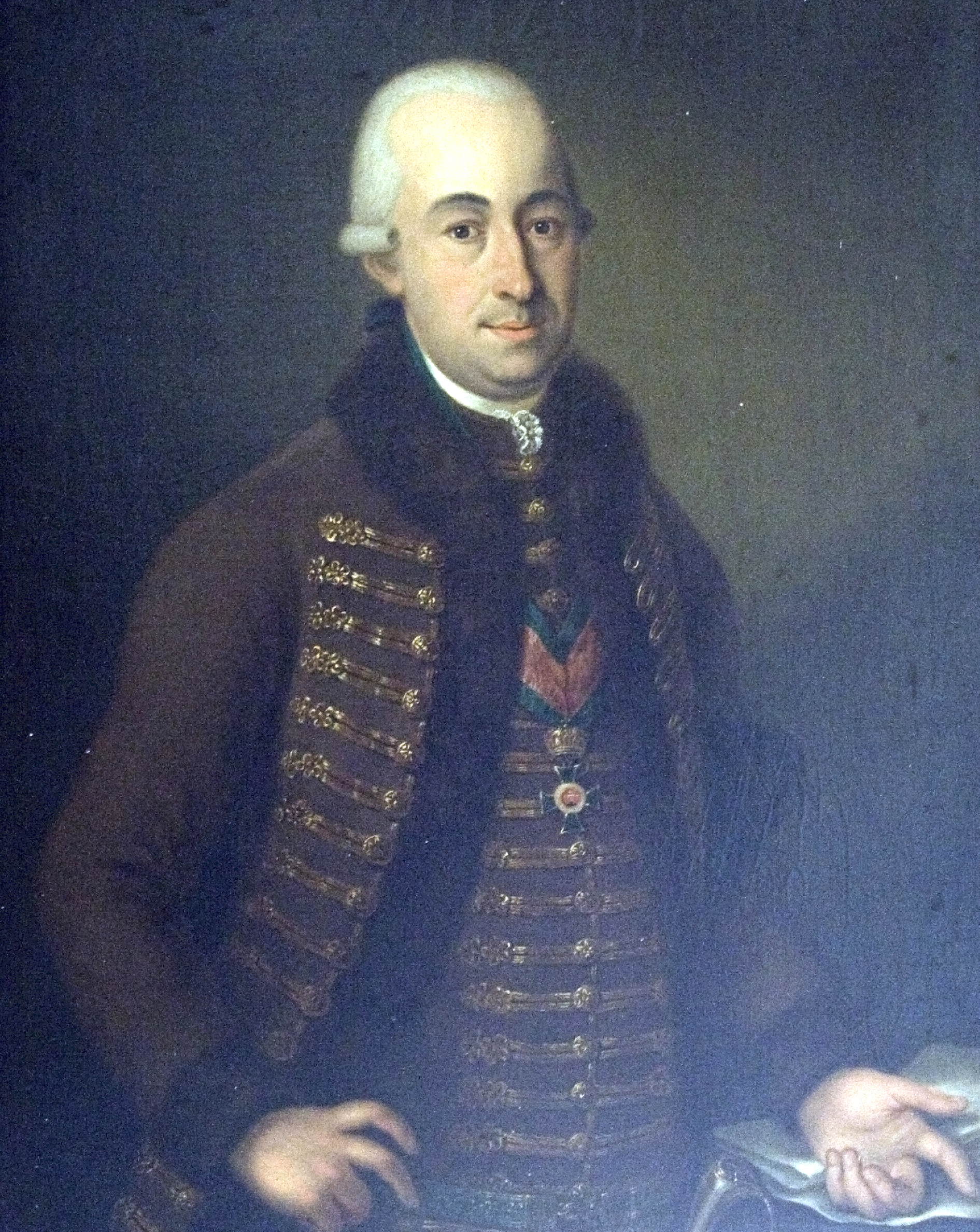
József Nagy de Felsőbük

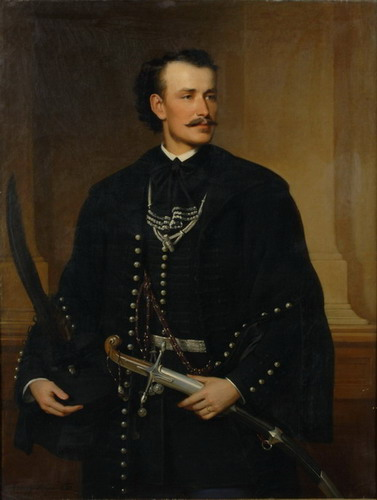
Ürményi Miksa

Castle Szidonia, (also known as Szidónia Manor House), is a 17th-century castle in Röjtökmuzsaj, Hungary. Nowadays, it operates as a spa hotel.

== History ==
During the 16th century, the Castle Szidonia estate consisted of a single-story building in a wooded area. In 1750, the castle was rebuilt using a romantic and classical style. The double-winged main building was surrounded by a large, U-shaped courtyard with pillared arcades. The military park estate originally occupied 8 hectares.

Pal Felsobuki Nagy, a member of the Hungarian parliament, inherited the estate after his father, Sándor Nagy of Sopron County died. Following the death of his only daughter, Juliana, the estate was given to her husband, Maximilian Urmenyi.

Urmenyi's descendants sold the building and left four pieces of bedroom furniture along with a life-size portrait of Holy Roman Empress Maria Theresa of Habsburg, which later disappeared. It is said that Theresa visited the Ürményi family and that the portrait was painted in memory of her visit.

In 1910, the estate was bought by Maximilian Berg, a German architect. Until then, the castle had remained largely unchanged. Berg rebuilt the castle according to military designs by an architect from the Austrian city of Wiener Neustadt. According to an inscription, the garden bridge, featuring two stone lions, was donated in 1923 by the German Thyssen industrial magnate family – today the Thyssen-Bornemisza family. The sons of Baron Maximilian inherited the castle.

In 1926, the Hungarian ambassador to the Vatican, Verseghy Elek Nagy, and his wife, Johanna Elizabeth Janssen, became the new owners. They extensively reconstructed and modernised the castle. During their ownership, the park around the castle was built and a large pool was constructed by swimmer and architect Alfréd Hajós. The park's pool area contained a small wooden Japanese house, which was unprecedented in the region. The courtyard was in the style of a French garden, with round trees, and hedges and flowers planted in a double square.

=== World War II ===
In the building, there are historical wooden tiles and a plaster ceiling in the lobby, as well as a marble fireplace that remained intact during World War II. In the chapel, there is a copy of the work of Italian painter and inventor Leonardo da Vinci, Madonna Litta, whose original is exhibited in the Hermitage Museum in Saint Petersburg, Russia. On either side of the altar were 17th-century wooden statues, which are now exhibited in the Christian Museum in Sopron, portraying the Apostle Paul and the holy bishop. The identity of the artist who produced these works is unknown.

The salon floor furniture comes from the Amsterdam palace of Louis Bonaparte, brother of Napoleon. The furniture is from a Dutch lady's estate. After her death, it was inherited by her daughter, the first wife of Verseghy Elek, Johanna Elizabeth Janssen, the granddaughter of the highly successful global tradesman and philanthropist, Peter Wilhelm Janssen of Amsterdam. In this way, the former royal salon furniture came to Röjtökmuzsaj.

The Verseghy family crypt is located in the castle park Verseghy. The father of Elek Nagy, Francis, was buried there in 1928. Elek Nagy Verseghy's wife died in 1934, aged 34 years, and is buried in the family crypt. When she died, Johanna Elizabeth left behind six small children; Francis Xavier, Edith, Magdalena, Alexa, Peter (who died in WWII), Maria Louisa and Elizabeth.

Verseghy Elek Nagy remarried Mary Louise Countess Zichy in 1936, with whom he had two more sons, Andrew and Elek.

Verseghy Elek Nagy and his wife were deported in 1951 to Tiszasüly – Kolop Tanya.

=== Post-communism ===
In 1997, Derry Márta bought the castle and renovated the historic structure despite its poor condition. The preparatory work for the surveying and design took place from February to August 1998, and construction from September 1998 to December 1999. The interior work began in parallel with the construction work from September to December 1999. The property was then opened to the public on New Year's Eve.

The renovations prioritized preserving as much of the old manor buildings as possible. Due to an increased number of hotel guests, new stairs were developed along the two side wings, raised roofs, and attic.

The ground floor was expanded with a glazed veranda conservatory and converted into a restaurant. The largest intervention in the build-wing swimming pool meant, but tried not to disturb the harmony of the castle. The backyard is maintained and developed while the current premises of the sauna and nicely varied. The swimming pool with a glass polygonal shape is not only the park trying to close a connection, but also refers to the development of the main entrance façade of a glazed conservatory as well.

The L-shaped farm building, intricately connected to the castle within the castle garden, has been under the management of the council since nationalization. It served various purposes, including functioning as a youth club, village library, and hair salon. It also hosted village celebrations and gatherings, making it a beloved and frequented location. Although the government desired its preservation, the import regulations posed a challenge. Consequently, a solution arose—entrusting the renovation of the farm building to the new owners of the castle, given its historical affiliation with the castle. This initiative aimed to restore the castle and its surroundings to its former glory, transforming it into a functional hotel. To ensure the community's well-being, the government designated a new, more suitable location for the village house, which not only serves as an event venue but also houses the local government permanently.

The former economic building of what is now called the Udvarhaz, increased the attic floor area, making sure, however, that the new building mass should not be too pronounced. There, 13 rooms were built.

The Japanese house and external ponds at the castle were restored to their original form.

The castle is surrounded by a 6.5-hectare (16-acre) park surrounding the castle providing a diverse landscape with notable artworks and room for recreation.

The "Wizard again" Mary Brány, a licensed civil engineer specialised in garden landscapes, designed the garden. It features Dutch buxus hedges and rosebushes, as envisioned in Alfred Hajos' plans. It also includes an outdoor pool, a Japanese-style house, and Verseghy Nagy Elek's former vault. Tree-lined paths adorned with chestnut trees enhance the scenic walks within the garden.

The garden's architectural framework, initially constructed by the Berlin-based company Späth under the supervision of Verseghy Nagy Elek, remained unchanged throughout the years. However, the sculptural elements within the garden were created by a team led by Geza Seiffert, along with Bela Mechle and Baumann Bela personally contributing to the artwork.

The original park and the newly constructed sports fields have remained unchanged, preserving their atmospheres.

Limited information is available about the original grounds, but it is known that the Dutch garden and the U-shaped inner garden have been preserved in their original form. These areas feature plane trees and a black walnut tree.

In January 2014, Professor Dr. Günter Nebel, the hotel's new owner, is trying to preserve the hotel's character and align with the ongoing development and adaptation of its concept, while ensuring a hospitable environment that has always welcomed visitors.

== Hotel ==
The castle belongs to the Austrian and the Hungarian Castle Alliance. It was first used as a hunting lodge, and has since been converted into a 46-room hotel.

The hotel was awarded the Castle Hotel of the Year in 2007.
