= Sopronbánfalva =

Place in Western Transdanubia, Hungary

Sopronbánfalva Wandorf
- Location of Sopronbánfalva in Hungary Sopronbánfalva (Hungary)
- Coordinates: 47°40′38″N 16°33′07″E
- Country: Hungary
- Region: Western Transdanubia
- County: Győr-Moson-Sopron
- District: Sopron
- Attached to Sopron: 1950
- Time zone: UTC+1 (CET)
  - Summer (DST): UTC+2 (CEST)
- Postal code: 9400

Sopronbánfalva (German: Wandorf), also known as Bánfalva, is a former village that is part of the city of Sopron, Hungary, since 1950. It is also called Kertváros (Garden-City in Hungarian) or Sopron-Kertváros. It is located west of the city center, at the northeastern foot of the Sopron Mountains, next to the road connecting Sopron with Brennbergbánya.

== History ==
According to the Treaty of Trianon in 1920, in the western part of the Kingdom of Hungary, the city of Sopron and its surroundings were assigned to Austria. After an uprising in 1921 in this region, a referendum was held and although 81% of Sopronbánfalva voters chose to join Austria, 65.08% of the votes in total were in favor of belonging to Hungary. This referendum was accepted by the Entente Powers and Sopron and its surrounding 8 villages (including Sopronbánfalva) remained in Hungary.

Before 1945, the village had 3,304 inhabitants, with the majority being ethnic Germans. However after the World War II, many ethnic Germans were deported, leaving only around 700 residents. This happened due to the desire to, among other things, secure the border with Austria.

The city of Sopron and Sopronbánfalva began to stretch towards each other at the beginning of the 20th century, and since the annexation of the village into the city in 1950, the areas have merged.

== Forced labour camp ==
From November 1944 to April 1945, there was a forced labour camp in Sopronbánfalva. Prisoners had to work on the South-east wall at the border of Austria and Hungary. On 2 December 1944, SA guards escorted to Sopronbánfalva 1,000 Jewish people from Budapest. They had been arrested between 27 and 29 November 1944 and put in railway freight cars.

The forced labour included felling trees, transporting logs, making planks and digging trenches. The prisoners were housed in dilapidated huts and barns. There were no beds. Initially, they were given straw as bedding. Later, brushwood was used. Most had blankets, nonetheless the forced labourers repeatedly froze to death in their quarters. Food was very poor, soup twice a day and some bread.

Leopold Winterer from Steinakirchen am Forst was Ortskommandant of the forced labour camp in Sopronbánfalva. Between December 1944 and February 1945, he murdered at least three imprisoned Hungarian Jews, on three occasions. He ordered them to walk in front of him and shot them from behind: two in the back of their heads and one in the heart. On 23 January 1946, the Volksgericht in Vienna sentenced Winterer to death. As one of the Nazis from the Scheibbs District, Leopold Winterer was hanged on 10 May 1946.

Camp guards also executed Jewish prisoners, by revolver, the butt of their guns, or with clubs. These guards included SA men from Sudetenland and Hungarian members of the Arrow Cross Party.

On 2 August 1945, it was reported that a mass grave with 350 badly mutilated corpses had been discovered in Sopronbánfalva. In total, 532 Jewish prisoners died in Sopronbánfalva. Among them were composer and conductor Sándor Vándor and graphic artist László Reiter. There is no memorial for the victims of the forced labour camp in Sopron or in Sopronbánfalva.

== Pauline–Carmelite Monastery ==
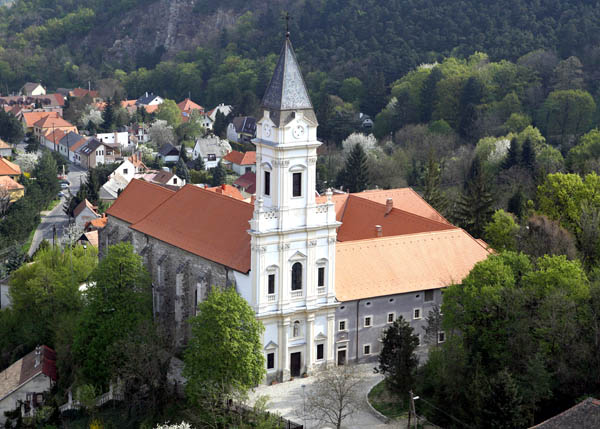
The Pauline–Carmelite Monastery

The monastery in Sopronbánfalva is today a hotel, resting on medieval foundations, located in the southwestern part of Sopron, in Sopronbánfalva. The forest-covered Sopron Mountains and the Heroes' Cemetery of Sopronbánfalva lie in the immediate vicinity of the monastery.

The Carmelite nuns moved to the monastery in 1892 and were there until 1950. They made a numerous reconstructions and modernizations, part of the work was to supply the church with new paintings, which fell to painter Zoltán Básti. He painted various biblical scenes and figures, which included Saint Peter's Basilica, the Esztergom Basilica, and Bishop Vilmos Apor who died in 1945 during the Siege of Győr. Bishop Vilmos Apor refused to release the women who fled to his residence, a Soviet soldier fatally wounded him during a scuffle. The 17-year-old bishop's nephew jumped in front of his uncle and received three bullets, the bishop was also hit by three bullets. Painting Apor was in itself a testament to considerable courage in the beginning of the Stalinist Rákosi era, which built up total terror. However, the painter was not satisfied with that: above the gallery, the triumph of Saint Michael the Archangel over Satan is depicted, but his defeated face was inspired by the Soviet dictator Joseph Stalin.

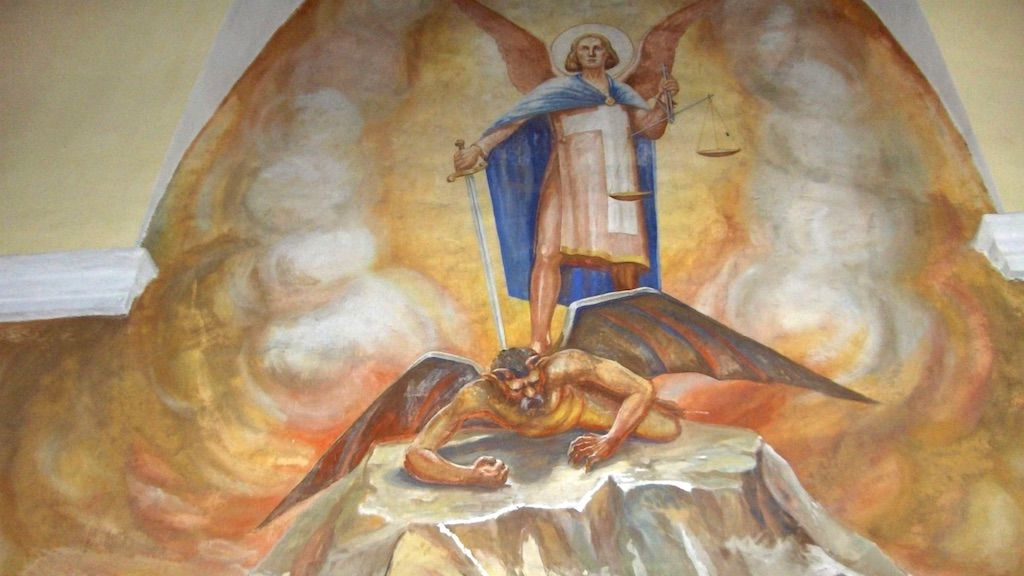
Saint Michael the Archangel triumphs over Satan

Attila Németh, the parish priest of the church said to the MTI: "He was a brave man, that much is certain. At that time, such an act would have been punished. Just think of the poets of the Soviet Union who wrote satirical poems about Stalin. Most of them were either executed or exiled to Siberia. Only very few could know the "secret" of the painter from Upper Hungary. Of course, the parish priest at the time, István Nagy, who ordered the works, could have been among them. In addition, the artist cunningly disguised his figures: in several other allegorical scenes also visible on the walls, he immortalized the faces of his compatriots in the village."

== Notable people ==
- Mihály Pénzes (1950–2026) – footballer

== See also ==
- 1921 Sopron plebiscite
