= Ádám Mányoki =

Hungarian painter (1773–1757)

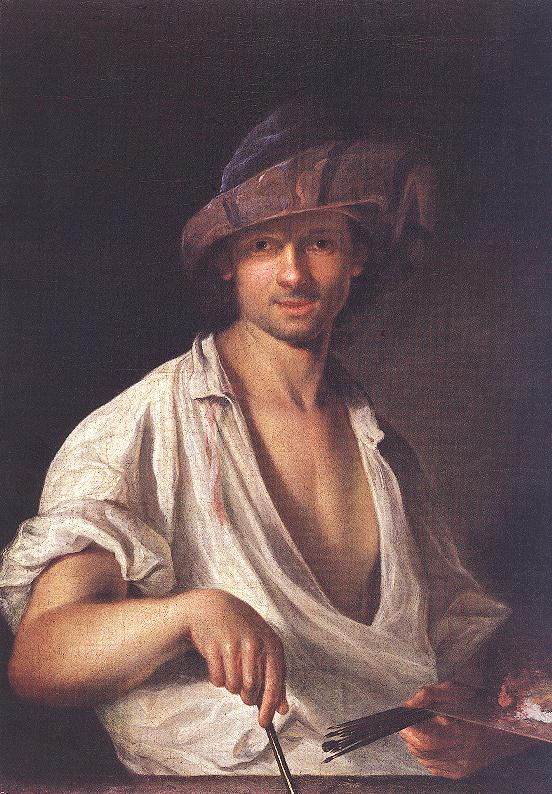
Self-portrait (1711)

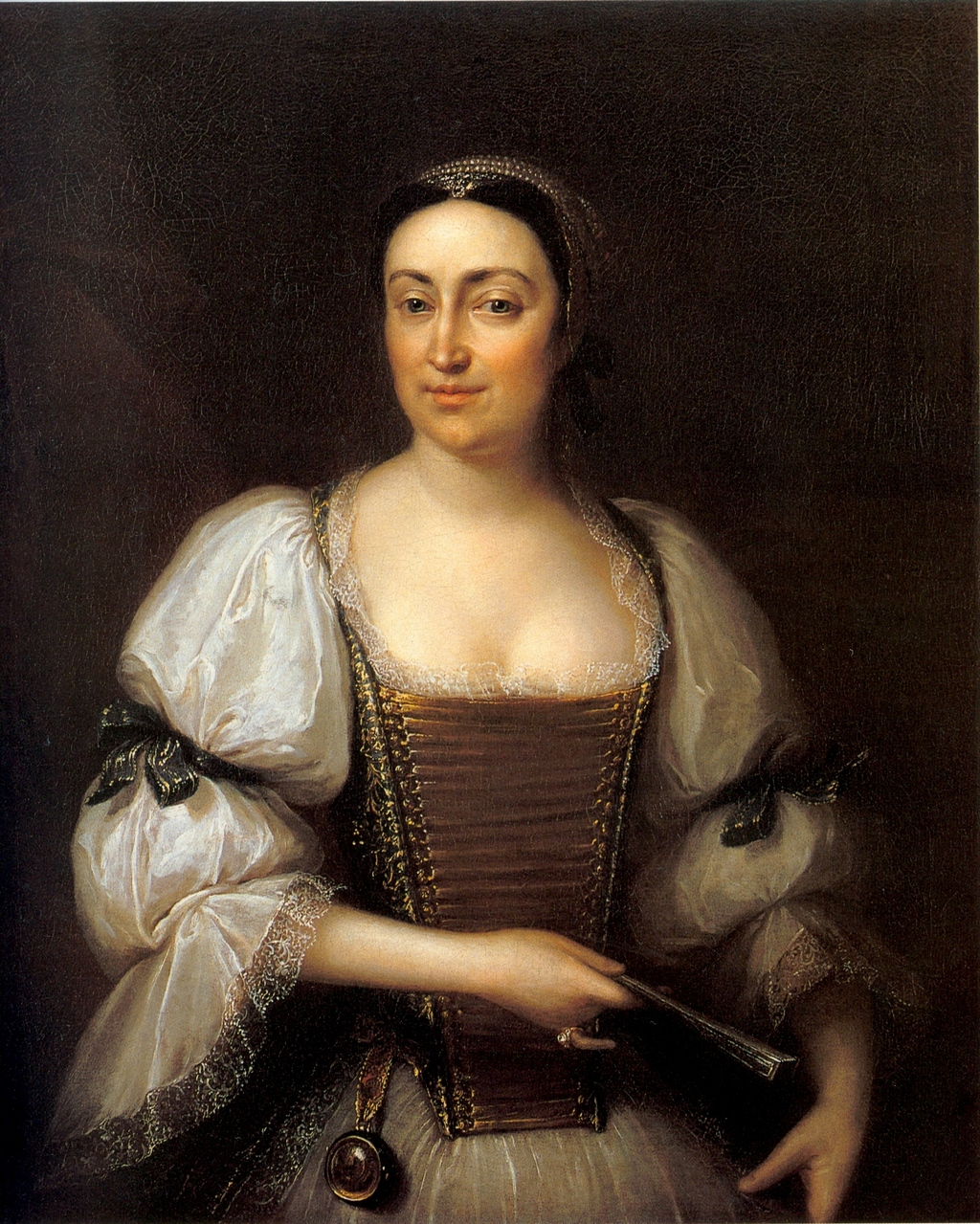
Portrait of Judit Podmanitzky (1724)

Ádám Mányoki (1673, Szokolya – 6 August 1757, Dresden) was a Hungarian Baroque portrait painter.

== Biography ==
He was the son of a Reformed pastor. The family was very poor, so he was apparently given into the care of a German staff officer named Dölfer, who promised to provide him with an education.

He first went to Lüneburg, then on to Hamburg for further schooling. After that, he studied with Andreas Scheits in Hanover and Nicolas de Largillière in Paris. He completed his studies in the Netherlands and was a court painter for King Frederick William I of Prussia in Berlin from 1703 to 1707.

In 1707, he entered the service of Francis II Rákóczi. He followed the Prince to Poland in 1711, but remained there rather than continuing on to France. While there, he was commissioned to do a portrait of King Augustus II and became a court painter in 1717. Leaving six years later, he visited Prague and Vienna, where he painted portraits of Emperor Charles VI and his daughters, Maria Theresa and Maria Anna. From 1724 to 1731, he was back in Hungary, where his sitters included Pál Ráday and his wife and members of the Podmanitzky family.

After 1731, he lived in Dresden and Leipzig and, in 1736, once again became a court painter, this time for Augustus III of Poland. He resigned in 1753 because of an unpaid salary. During his final years, he squandered his money on alchemy, a common mania at that time. He died in Dresden at the age of 84, totally impoverished, and had to be buried by friends.
