= Mihály Pénzes =

Hungarian footballer (1950–2026)

Personal information
- Date of birth: 30 July 1950
- Place of birth: Sopronbánfalva, Hungary
- Date of death: 26 June 2026 (aged 75)
- Place of death: Győr, Hungary
- Position: Winger

Youth career
- Soproni Vasas

Senior career*
Years	Team	Apps	(Gls)
1971–1982	Rába ETO	193	(34)
- Csornai SE
- Bábolna

International career
1974	Hungary U23		
1974	Hungary	1	(0)
- * Club domestic league appearances and goals

Mihály Pénzes (30 July 1950 – 26 June 2026) was a Hungarian footballer who played as a winger.

== Club career ==
Born in Sopronbánfalva, Pénzes started playing football for Soproni Vasas. After being discharged from the military, he was tested by Rába ETO for two weeks in Kőszeg, before joining the club, and later going on to score on his Nemzeti Bajnokság I debut. In 1974, Budapest Honvéd wanted to sign him to replace the departing László Pusztai, but he stayed with Rába ETO. He was mostly able to avoid injuries, apart from an open hand fracture he suffered in a training match. After leaving Rába ETO, he played for Csornai SE and Bábolna.

Notably, in a match against MTK Budapest, he scored a winning goal which hit the side netting but rolled into the net, and was awarded a goal by the referee. In total, he played 193 league matches for Rába ETO, scoring 34 goals and notably helping the club win the 1978–79 Magyar Kupa, as well as finishing third in the 1973–74 league season.

== International career ==
In 1974, Pénzes helped Hungary's under-23 national team win that year's UEFA European Under-23 Championship, where he scored a goal in the quarter-finals against the Netherlands and in extra time during the semi-final against the Soviet Union. He was not in the starting XI for either match of the final, and wasn't given a medal because of that, with him later being given a life-like replica for his 60th birthday in 2010, with permission from UEFA.

That same year, he was first called up to the Hungary national team under József Bozsik. His debut came on 13 October 1974, in a 4–2 win against Luxembourg in 1976 UEFA European Championship qualifying. Afterwards, he was never called up to the national team again.

== Personal life and death ==
Following his departure from Rába ETO, he began working in the material supply department of a Rába factory, where his boss was former Hungarian international footballer Sándor Gőcze.

Pénzes died following a long illness at a hospital in Győr, on 26 June 2026, at the age of 75.
