= Széchenyi Mansion =

Coordinates: 47°36′31″N 16°42′22″E

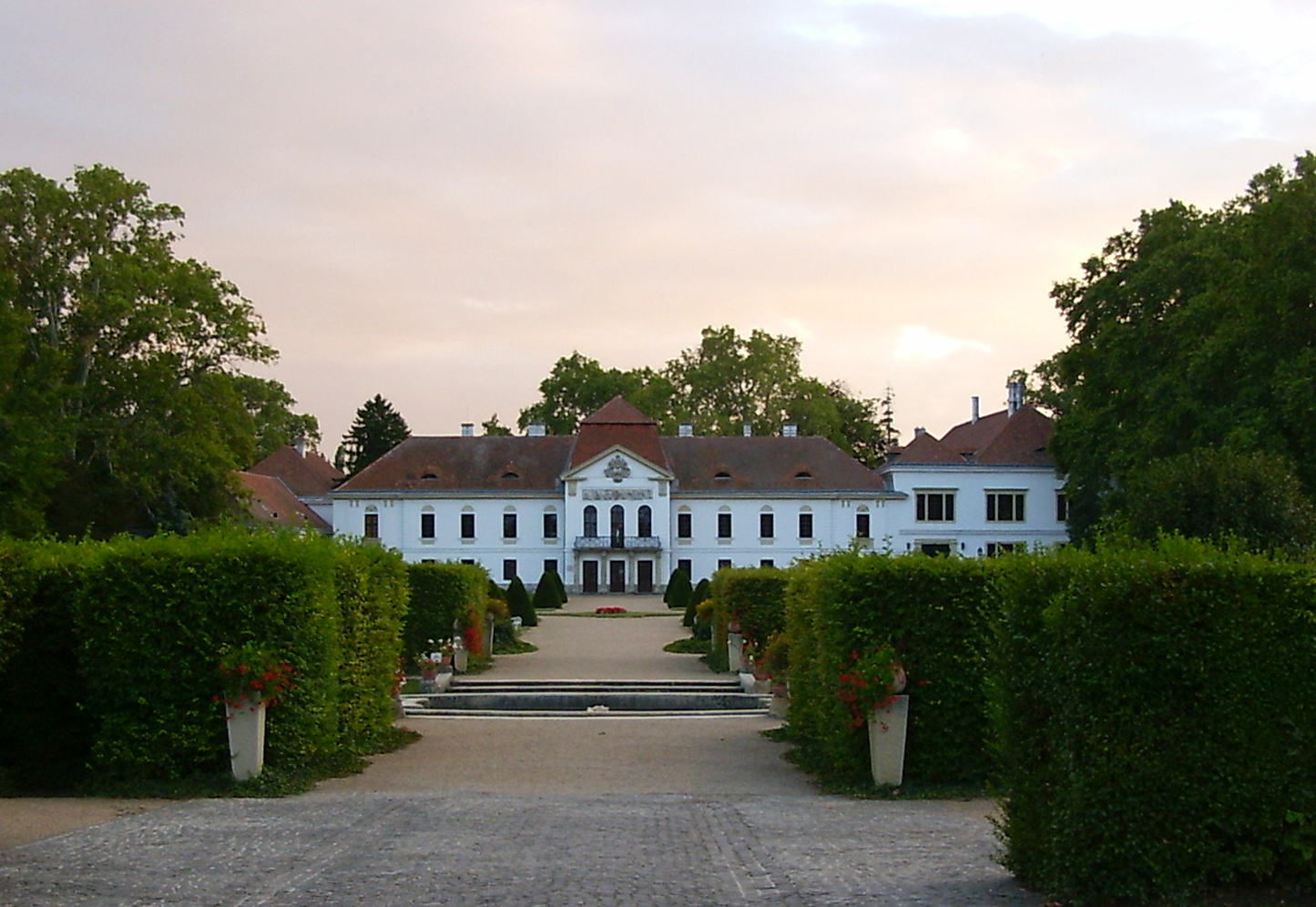
Széchenyi mansion

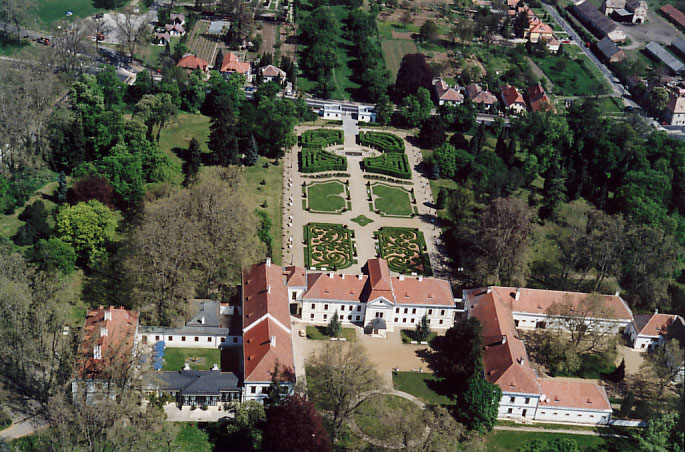
Aerial photograph

The Széchenyi mansion (Hungarian: Széchenyi-kastély) is a historic mansion in Nagycenk, Hungary.

It was built in the Baroque style by the Széchenyi family through consecutive generations. Today, it serves as a memorial museum of István Széchenyi, its most famous resident.
