= Röjtökmuzsaj =

- Flag Coat of arms

- Location of Győr-Moson-Sopron county in Hungary

- Location of Röjtökmuzsaj
- Coordinates: 47.55632°N 16.83517°E
- Country: Hungary
- County: Győr-Moson-Sopron

Area
  - Total: 15.87 km^{2} (6.13 sq mi)

Population (2004)
  - Total: 497
  - Density: 31.31/km^{2} (81.1/sq mi)
- Time zone: UTC+1 (CET)
  - Summer (DST): UTC+2 (CEST)
- Postal code: 9451
- Area code: 99

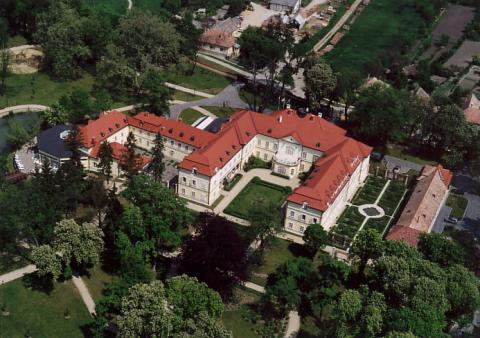
Röjtökmuzsaj- Palace

Röjtökmuzsaj is a village in Győr-Moson-Sopron county, Hungary. It has sites such as Castle Szidonia.
