= Harka =

Coordinates: 47°38′00″N 16°36′00″E

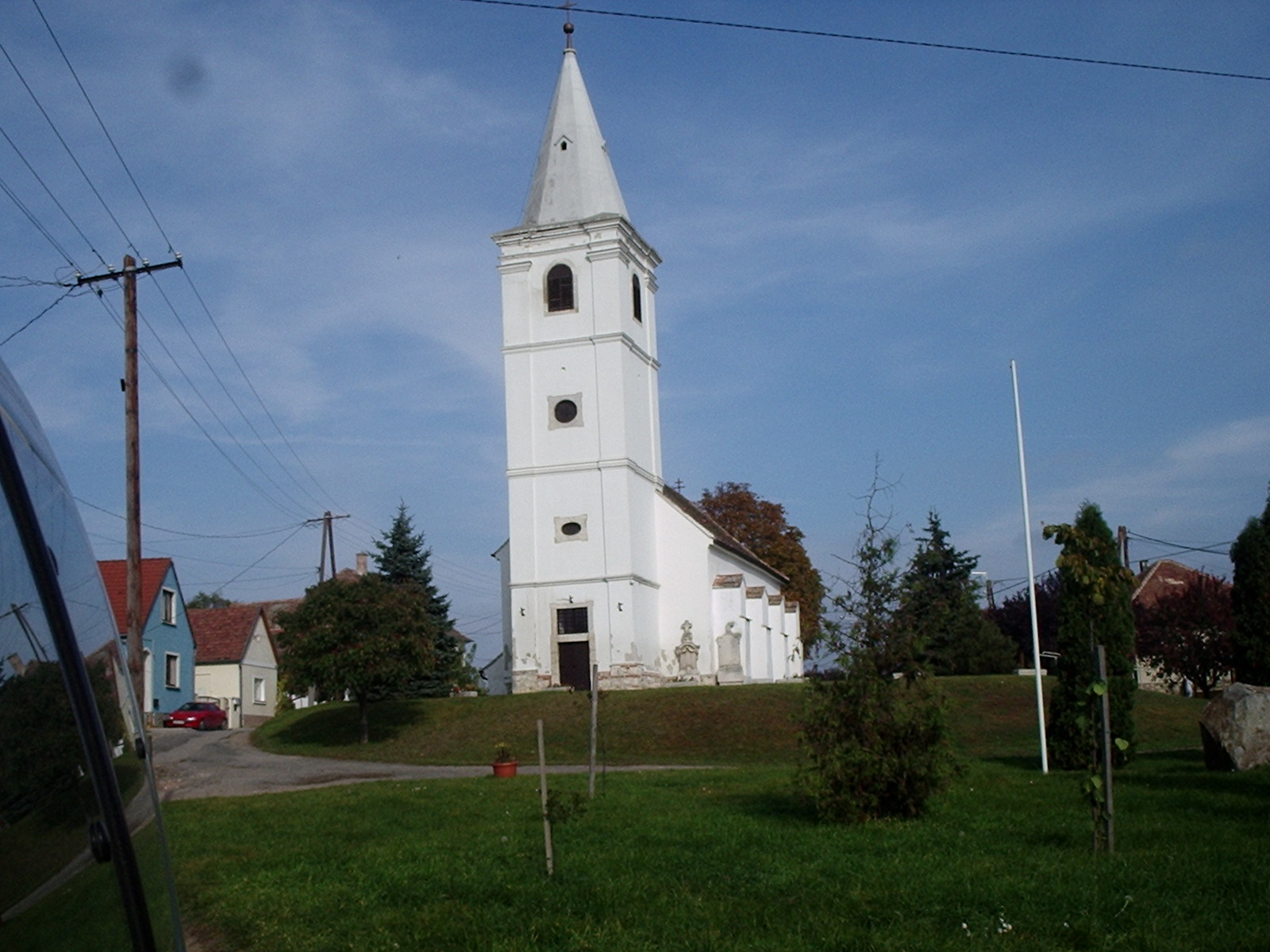

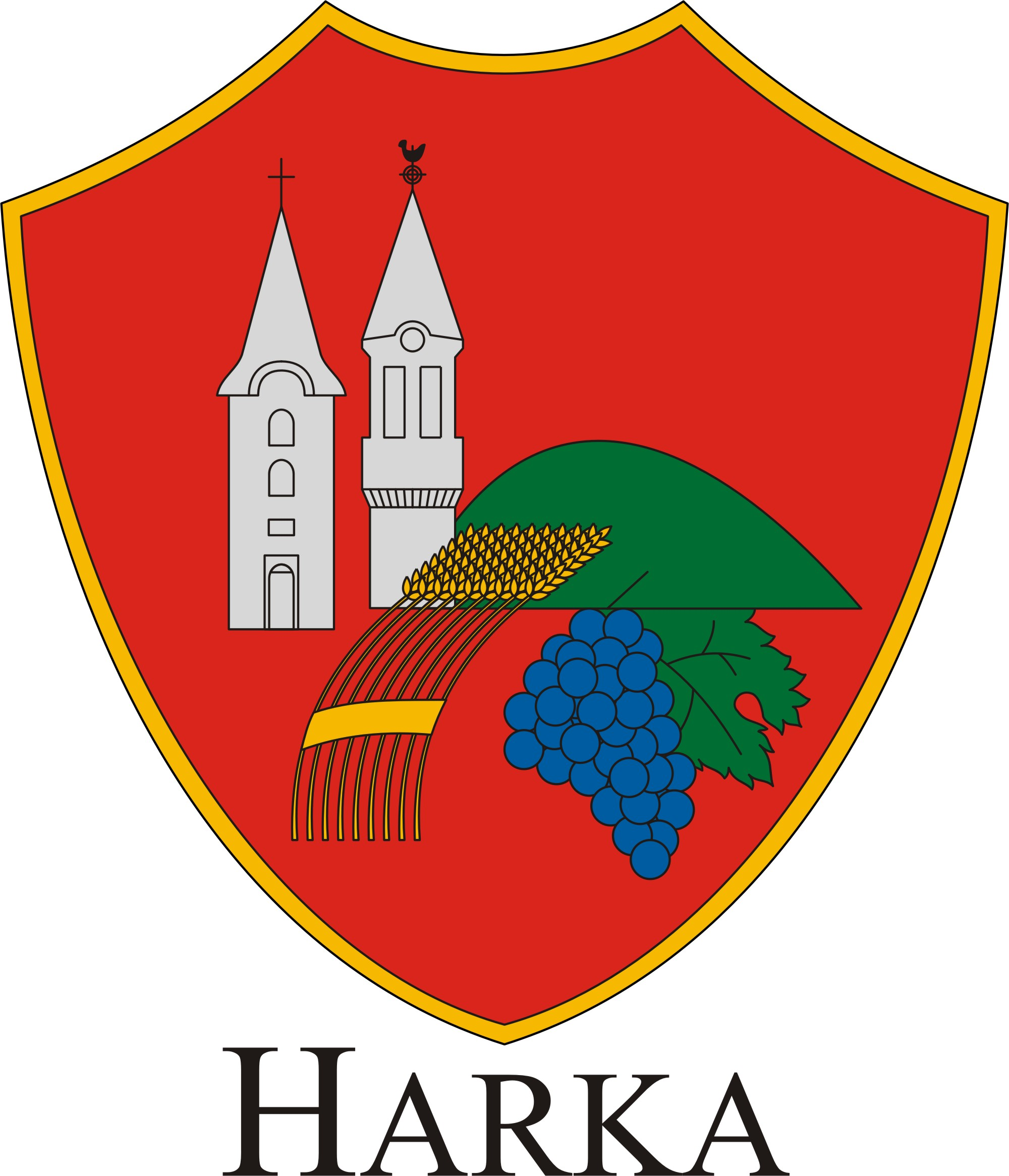
- Coat of arms

- Location of Győr-Moson-Sopron county in Hungary
- Country: Hungary
- County: Győr-Moson-Sopron

Area
  - Total: 11 km^{2} (4.2 sq mi)

Population (2004)
  - Total: 1,553
  - Density: 141.18/km^{2} (365.7/sq mi)
- Time zone: UTC+1 (CET)
  - Summer (DST): UTC+2 (CEST)
- Postal code: 9422
- Area code: 99

Harka is a village in Győr-Moson-Sopron County, Hungary.

== History ==
Following World War I, the village took part in a plebiscite in 1921 along with eight surrounding settlements, asking whether they wished to remain in Hungary, or to join the new Austrian Republic. Although the village voted 82.2% in favour of joining Austria, the majority of voters overall (mostly those in Sopron) voted 65.1% in favour of remaining in Hungary.
