= Viktor Madarász =

Hungarian painter

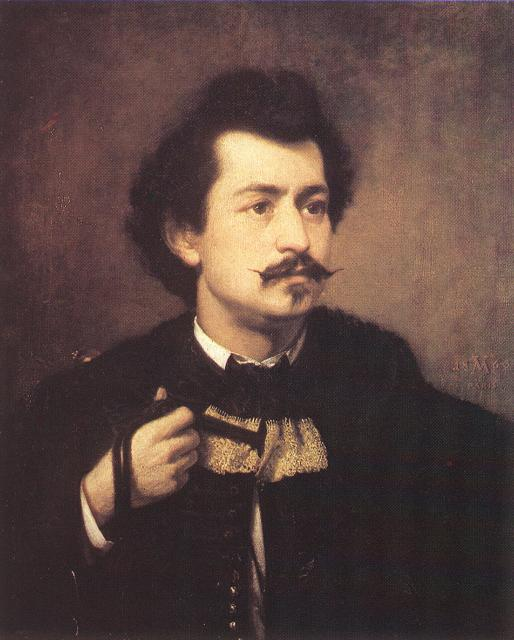
- Self-portrait (1863)
- Born: 14 December 1830; Csetnek, Kingdom of Hungary
- Died: 10 January 1917 (aged 86); Budapest, Kingdom of Hungary
- Resting place: Kerepesi Cemetery, Józsefváros, Budapest
- Education: Academy of Fine Arts Vienna; École des Beaux-Arts
- Occupation: Artist
- Spouses: Adeline Grosjean (m. 1871; died 1883) Jolán Ziska (m. 1889–1917)
- Children: 9
- Parents: András Madarász (father); Zsuzsanna Mühlbahn (mother)

Viktor Madarász (14 December 1830 – 10 January 1917) was a Hungarian painter in the Romantic style. He is best known for his historical scenes and portraits.

== Biography ==
He was born in Csetnek, and descended from an impoverished noble family originating in Gömör és Kis-Hont County. His father, András, was an iron manufacturer and craftsman. Originally, he was destined for a career in law and went to study in Pozsony.

When the Hungarian Revolution began, he and his brother (also named András) left school to join the struggle. He was a participant in numerous actions, became a Second Lieutenant and was present during the surrender at Világos. After hiding out briefly, he returned home on foot and joined his family in Pécs. He continued with his legal studies, but also began taking lessons from a local artist.

In 1853, he enrolled for preparatory work at the Academy of Fine Arts, Vienna. Two years later, he entered the history painting class of Ferdinand Georg Waldmüller. His first historical painting, Kuruc and Labanc (depicting brothers fighting on opposite sides), was warmly received. In 1856, he went to Paris, where he studied in the studios of Léon Cogniet and at the École des Beaux Arts. He was also influenced by the style of Paul Delaroche. His painting The Mourning of László Hunyadi won a medal at the 1861 Salon.

He returned to Hungary in 1870, but his style was heavily criticized for being too French, and revolutionary fervor had lessened considerably. In 1873, after especially harsh criticism of his work Gábor Bethlen Among the Scholars, he retired from painting and took over his father's business. He was so discouraged that many of his best works were virtually given away.

In 1902, his business went bankrupt and was sold at auction. The following year, he attempted to restart his artistic career by painting portraits, but they were not up to his previous standards. He died in Budapest, totally forgotten, during the First World War.

== Selected paintings ==
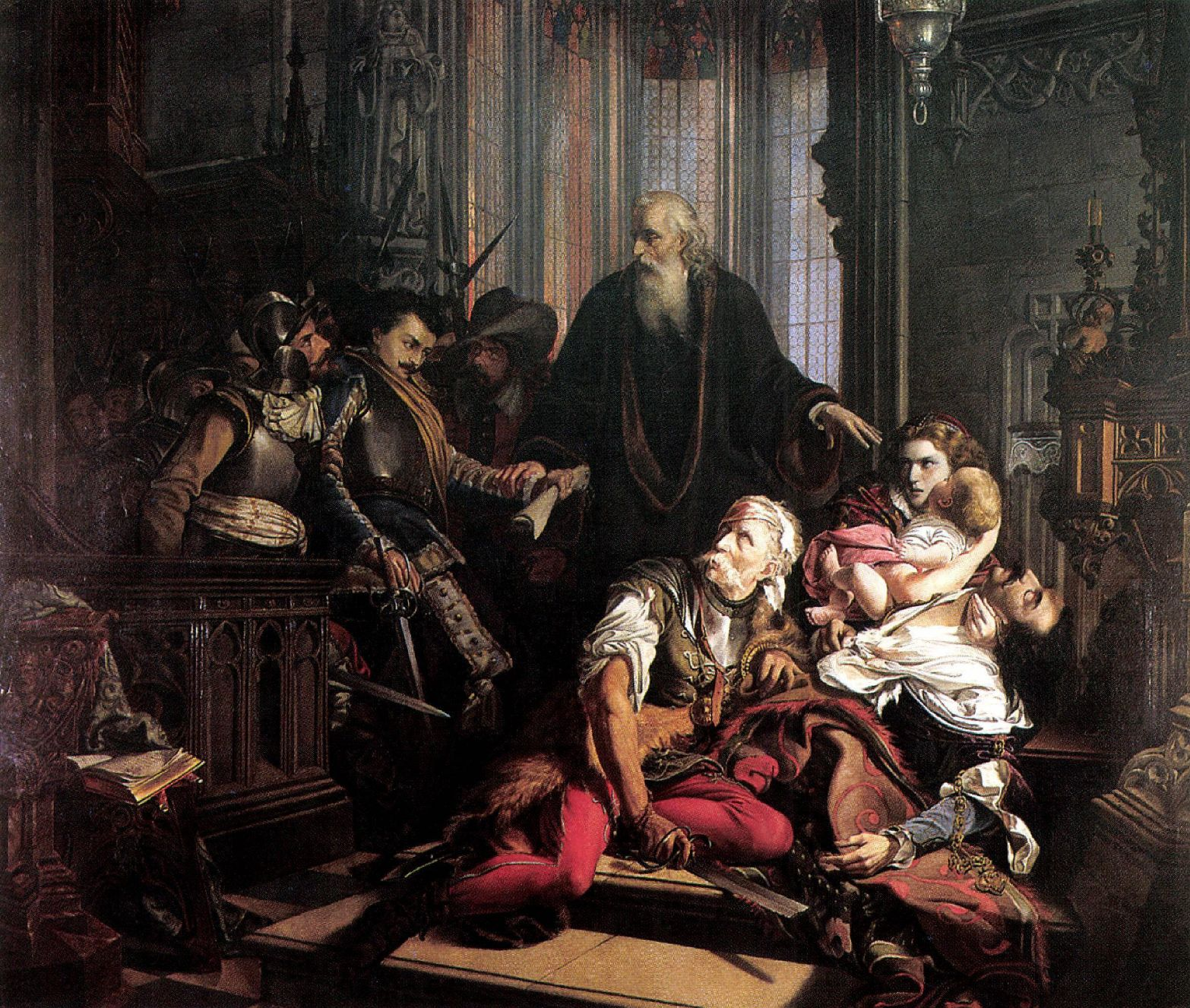
Kuruc and Labanc

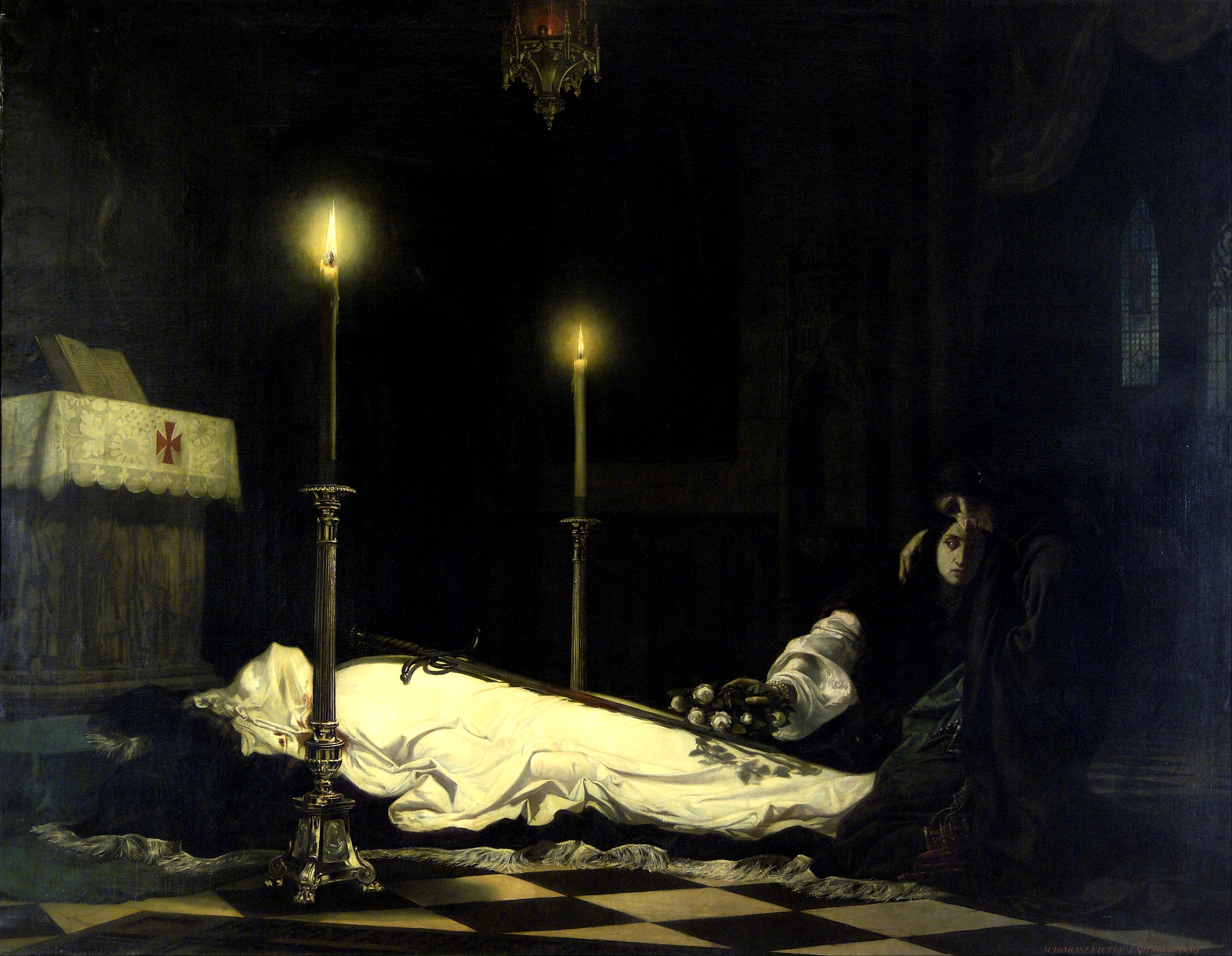
The Mourning of
László Hunyadi

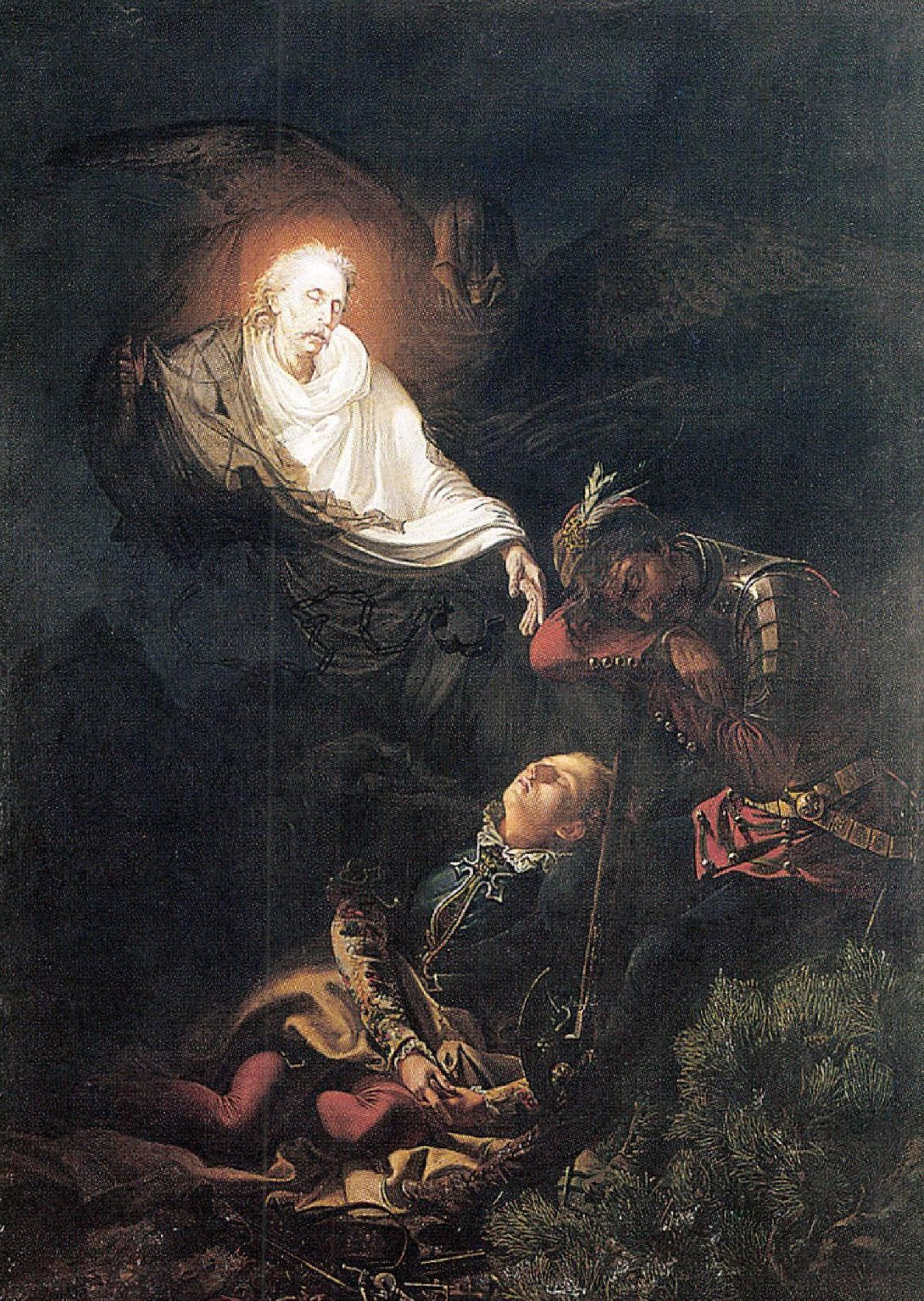
Thököly's Dream

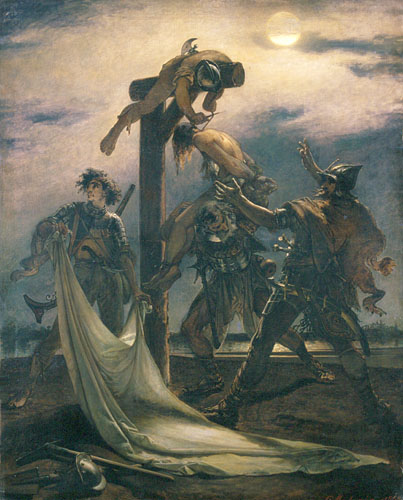
Dózsa's People
