= Szokolya =

- Flag Coat of arms

- Location of Szokolya in Hungary
- Coordinates: 47°52′2.21″N 19°0′28.48″E
- Country: Hungary
- Region: Central Hungary
- County: Pest
- Subregion: Váci
- Rank: Village

Area
  - Total: 59.07 km^{2} (22.81 sq mi)

Population (1 January 2008)
  - Total: 1,799
  - Density: 30.46/km^{2} (78.88/sq mi)
- Time zone: UTC+1 (CET)
  - Summer (DST): UTC+2 (CEST)
- Postal code: 2624
- Area code: +36 27
- KSH code: 06947
- Website: www.szokolya.hu

Szokolya is a village in Pest county, Hungary.

Szokolya is a village of two thousand residents in the largest basin of the Börzsöny Hills. The Morgó Brook runs across the village. The area is a tourist destination, 45–50 minutes from Budapest by car and on the Eurovelo bicycle route.

The Nagyhideg-Hegy ski centre is open in the winter.
