= Ágfalva =

Ágfalva Agendorf
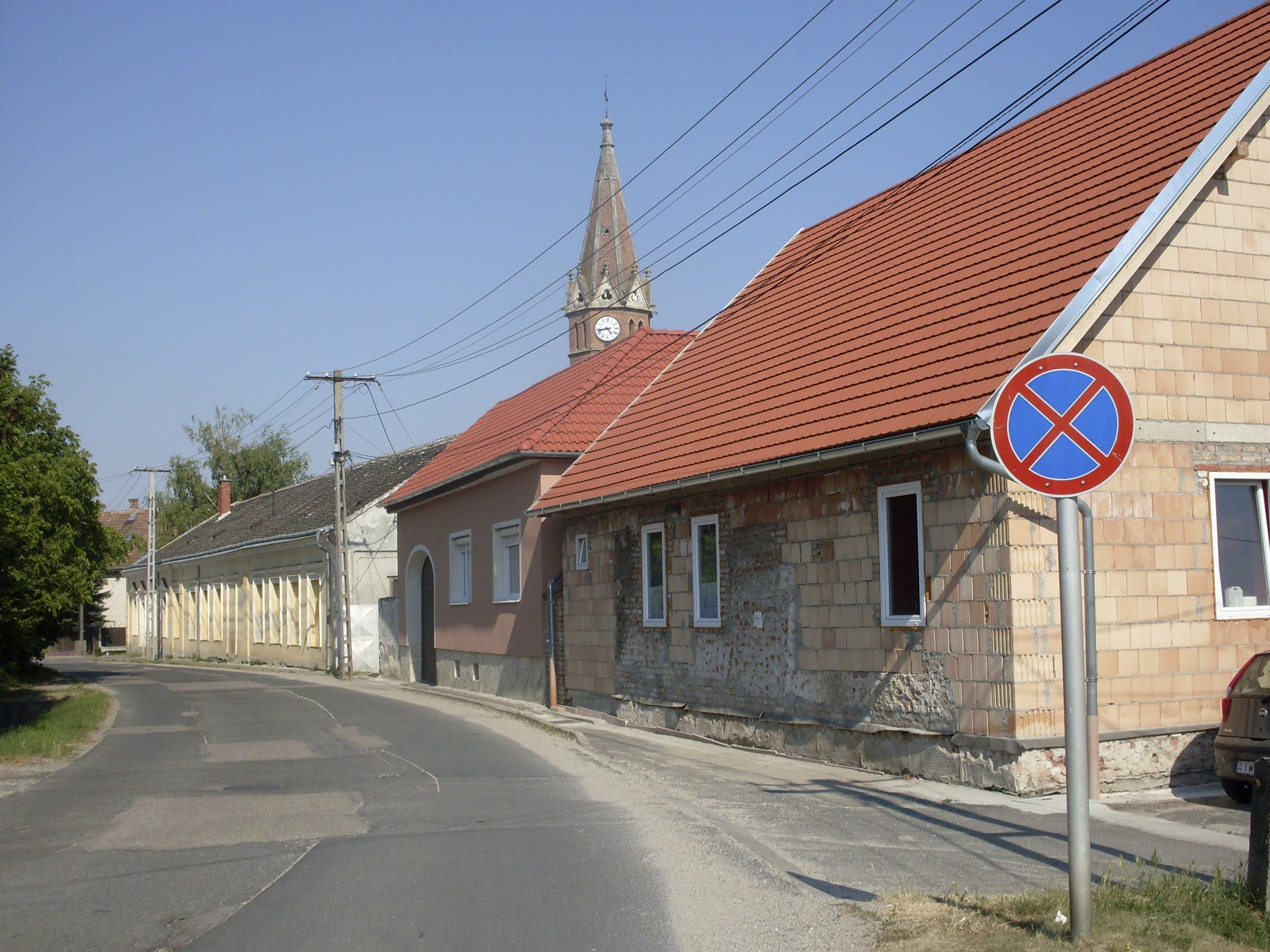

- Flag Coat of arms

- Location of Ágfalva Ágfalva (Hungary)
- Coordinates: 47.68899°N 16.51687°E
- Country: Hungary
- County: Győr-Moson-Sopron
- District: Sopron

Area
  - Total: 13.08 km^{2} (5.05 sq mi)

Population (2004)
  - Total: 1,956
  - Density: 149.54/km^{2} (387.3/sq mi)
- Time zone: UTC+1 (CET)
  - Summer (DST): UTC+2 (CEST)
- Postal code: 9423
- Area code: 99

Ágfalva (German: Agendorf) is a village in Hungary, in the north-western Győr-Moson-Sopron region, 4 kilometers from Sopron and two kilometers from the border of Austria.

== Name ==
The original name of the settlement was Dág, recorded in 1194 and coming from the Hungarian personal name. In German, it was known as Dogendorf (1207). The village was first recorded as Agendorf in 1493. The prefix being identified with the word ág ('branch') and the suffix translated, this was adopted to Hungarian as Ágfalva.

== History ==
Ágfalva was first mentioned in a document from 1194. Archaeological evidence proves inhabitation at least since Roman occupation. The first church was built in 1265, it was pulled down in 1789 to be replaced by a new church, the catholic St George church (1792). The Protestants received permission to build a church in 1784. Until 1892 the service was in German.

In 1892 the railway to Brennbergbánya was constructed.

Following World War I, the village took part in a plebiscite in 1921 along with eight surrounding settlements, asking whether they wished to remain in Hungary, or to join the new Austrian Republic. Although the village voted 82.2% in favour of joining Austria, the majority of voters overall (mostly those in Sopron) voted 65.1% in favour of remaining in Hungary.

== Gallery ==
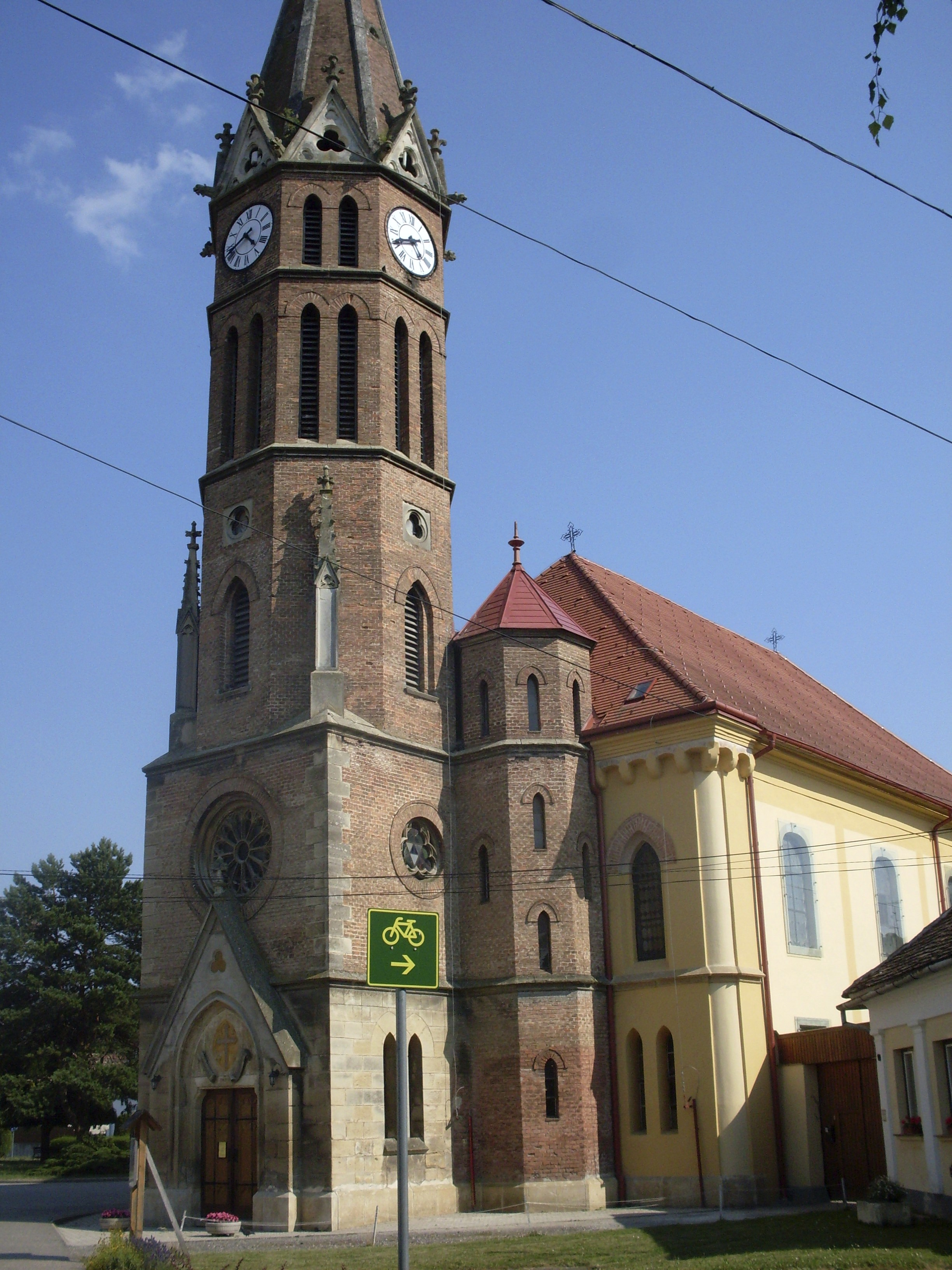
Protestant church

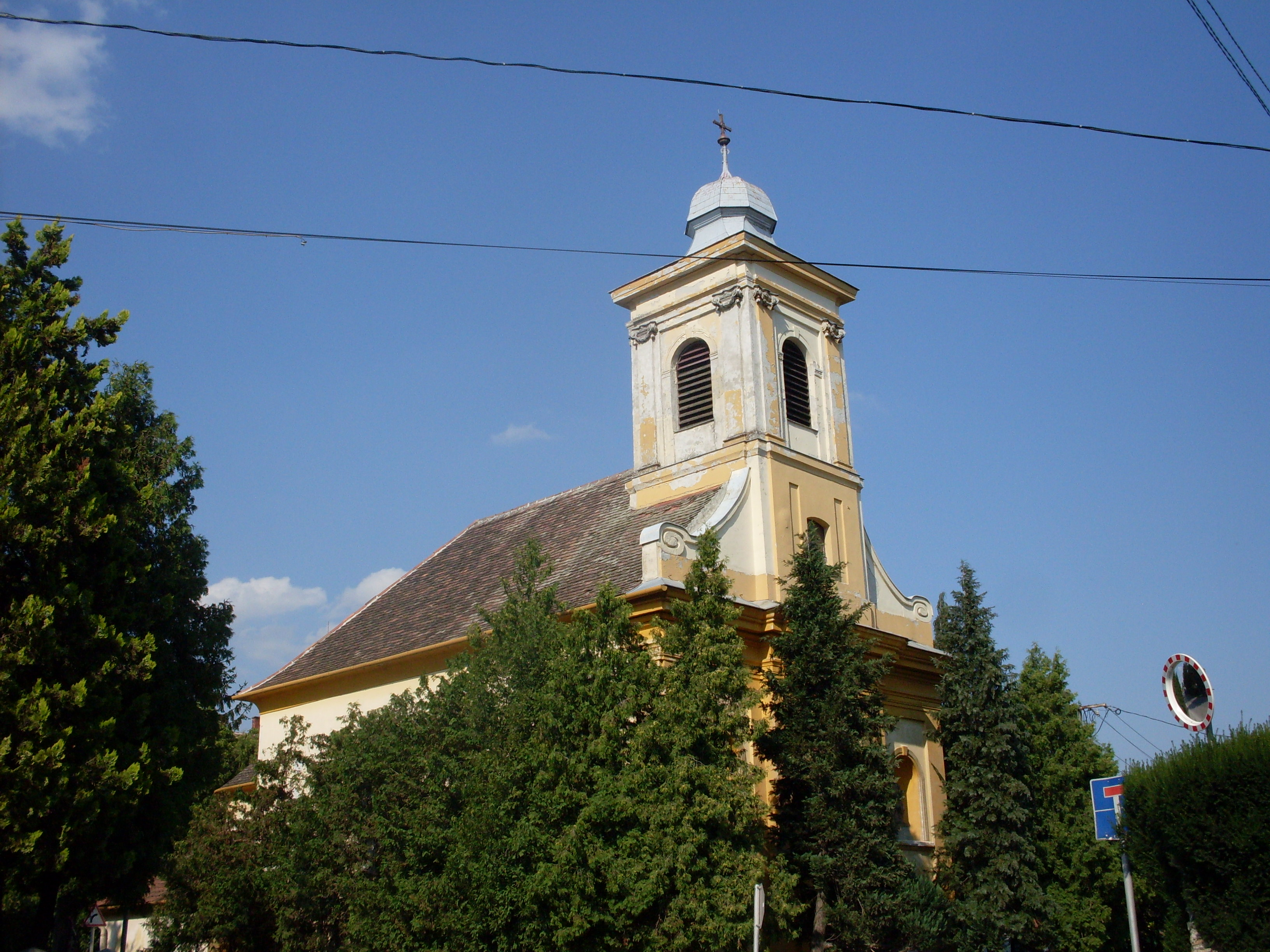
Catholic church

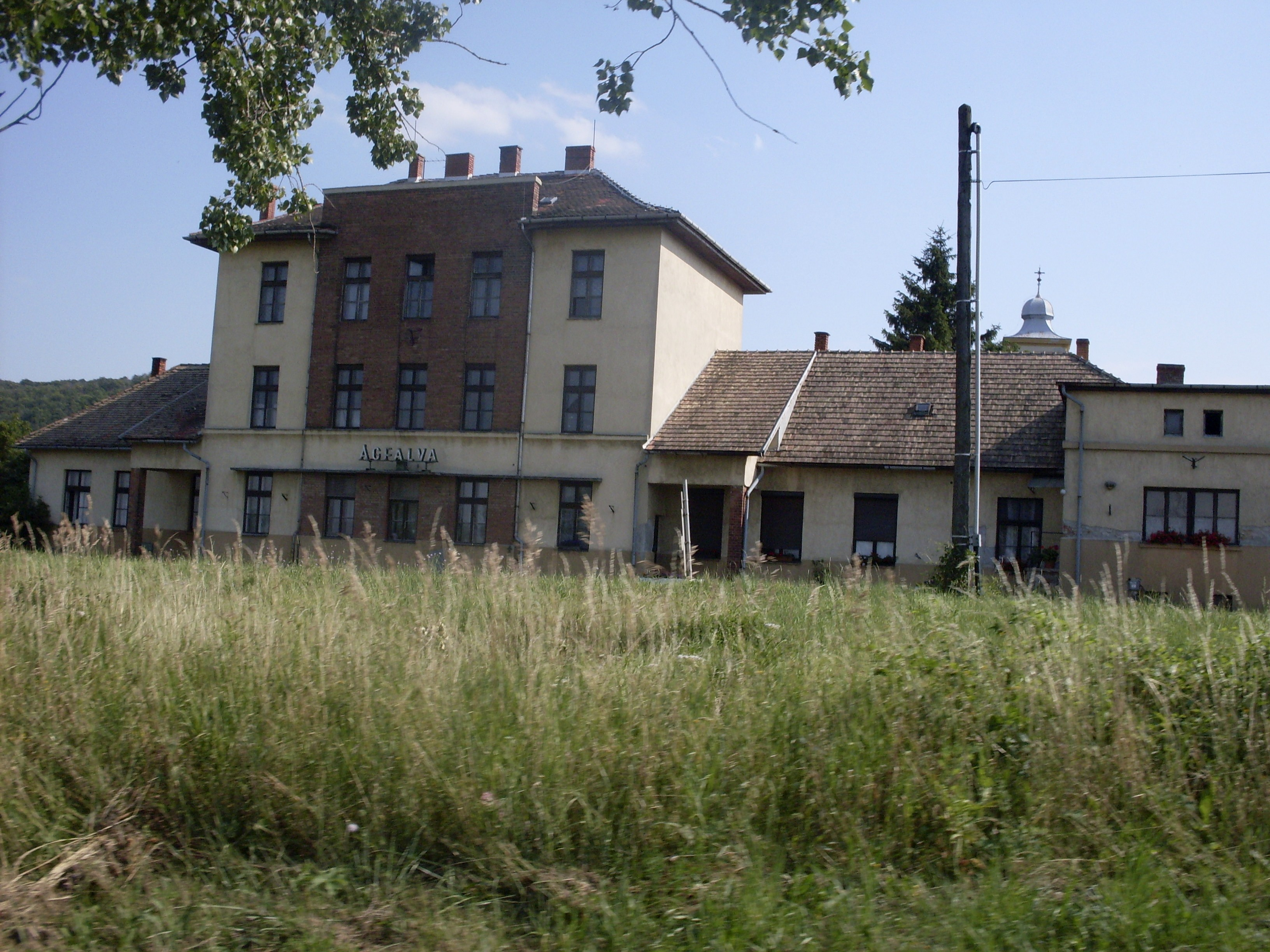
Railway station

== Sources ==
- Ausflüge in der Umgebung von Sopron. Escort '63 Bt. 2004. P. 21-30
