= Balf, Hungary =

Town in Hungary

Balf Wolfs
- Town
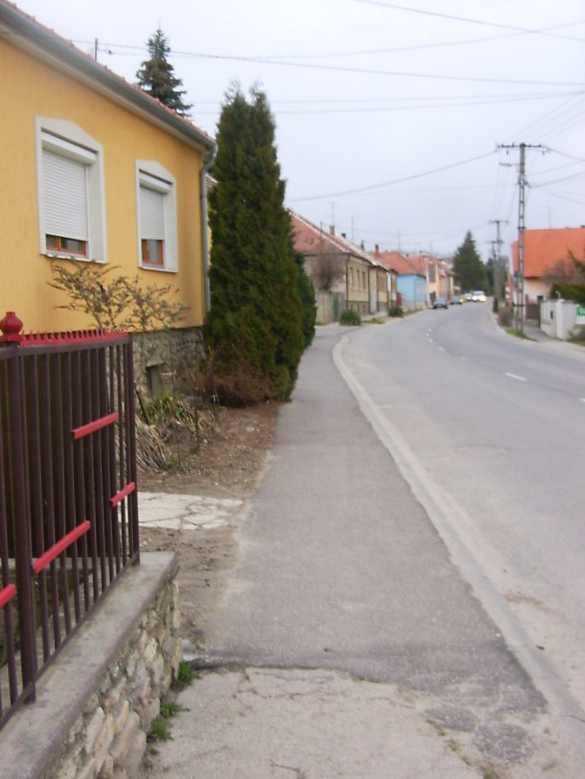

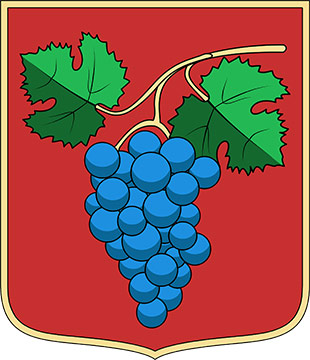
- Seal
- Interactive map of Balf
- Country: Hungary
- District: Sopron

Population
  - Total: 1,000

Balf (German: Wolfs) was a village in Sopron then Győr-Sopron County. In 1985 it became part of the town of Sopron. It has approximately 1,000 inhabitants.

== History ==
Following World War I, the village took part in a plebiscite in 1921 along with eight surrounding settlements, asking whether they wished to remain in Hungary, or to join the new Austrian Republic. Although the village voted 60.4% in favour of joining Austria, the majority of voters overall (mostly those in Sopron) voted 65.1% in favour of remaining in Hungary.
