= János Jankó =

Hungarian painter, caricaturist, and graphicist (1833–1896)

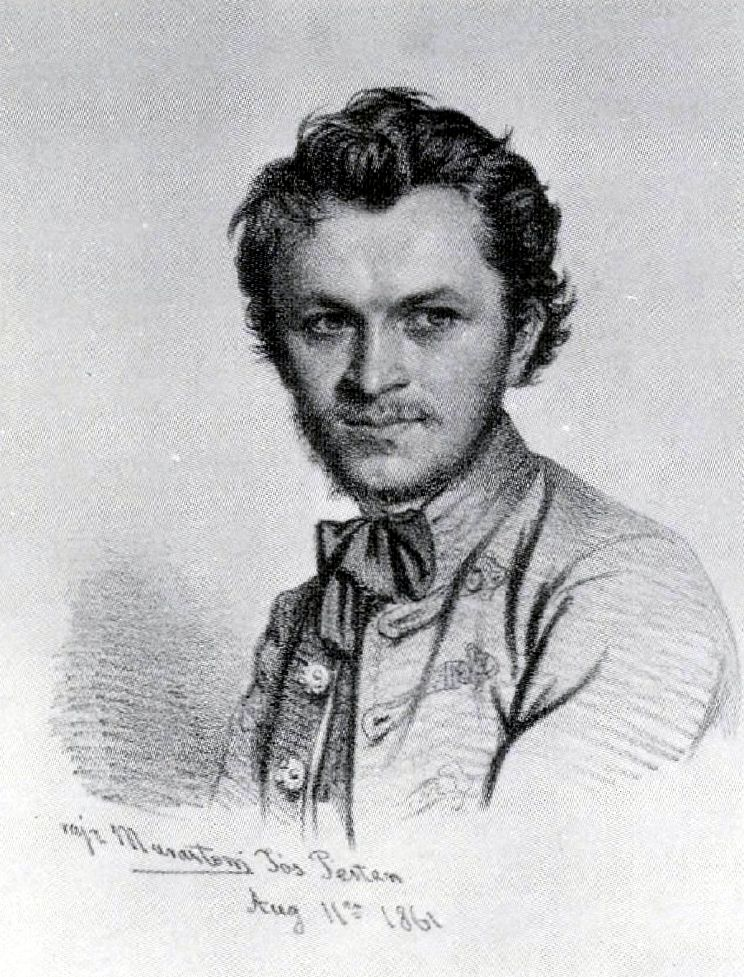
János Jankó.

János Jankó (1833–1896) was a Hungarian painter, caricaturist and graphicist. He is one of the earliest Hungarian comics artists.

== Life ==
Jankó was born in Tótkomlós. He came from a Lutheran industrialist family as the son of János Jankó and Zsuzsanna Tomka. He attended high school in Szarvas and also taught drawing.

In 1855, he moved to Pest and worked as a newspaper illustrator. From 1858, Mór Jókai's newly launched newspaper Az Üstökös reported. From 1854 to 1861, he exhibited his folk portraits at the Pest Society of Art, with some of them he was successful, but as time went on, he was less and less able to spare time for his favorite occupation, painting.

From 1864, he studied for two years in Vienna, where his caricatures were quickly noticed. His drawings were published in several Hungarian humor magazines, and they were popular and typical of the era.

His drawings were published in Vienna's Kikeriki, as well as Miska Bolond, Bolond Istók, Fekete Leves, Füstölő, Nagy Tükör, Urambatyám, Üstökös, Vasárnapi Újság, etc. published. His typical and popular caricature characters (Vendel Sanyaró, Dániel Tojáss, Salamon Seiffensteiner, etc.) appeared mainly in Borsszem Jankó. The number of his drawings is estimated at around 70,000.

He returned to Pest in 1866 at the invitation of the Hungarian leading newspapers, and in January he married Gizella Bajai in the Deák tér Lutheran church (his godmother was Jókai).

At the same time, he worked for several media organizations (regardless of political party orientation, his talent was used by many newspaper editors). He also illustrated works of fiction as a graphic designer. Until the middle of the 1880s, for more than 2 decades, he pretty much dominated the front page illustrations: "Pest had well-known painters, but the publishers could not find a good draftsman or illustrator for expensive money. Under such circumstances, the fast-working and imaginative János Jankó had to be highly appreciated."

His picture stories created together with Mór Jókai for Üstökös can be considered the forerunners of Hungarian comics. The first ones were drawn by Jókai himself, later he only gave sketches to Jankó. Their returning figures were Gömböcz and Csukli, as well as Magyar Miska and Német Miska. The story "Old tale about the common donkey", originally published in the February 1867 issue of 'Hazánk s a Külföld' [Our country and abroad], was republished in the 2nd issue of the Papírmozi comics anthology in 2007.

== His oil paintings ==
- Outlaw in hiding, 1854
- Greeting to the innkeeper, 1855
- Greeting the Bride, 1855
- Hungarian peasant entertainment, 1860
- The birth of the folk song, 1860 (Budapest, Hungarian National Gallery)
- Csokonai at the wedding,[4] 1869 (Debrecen, Déri Museum)
