= Kópháza =

Kópháza Koljnof
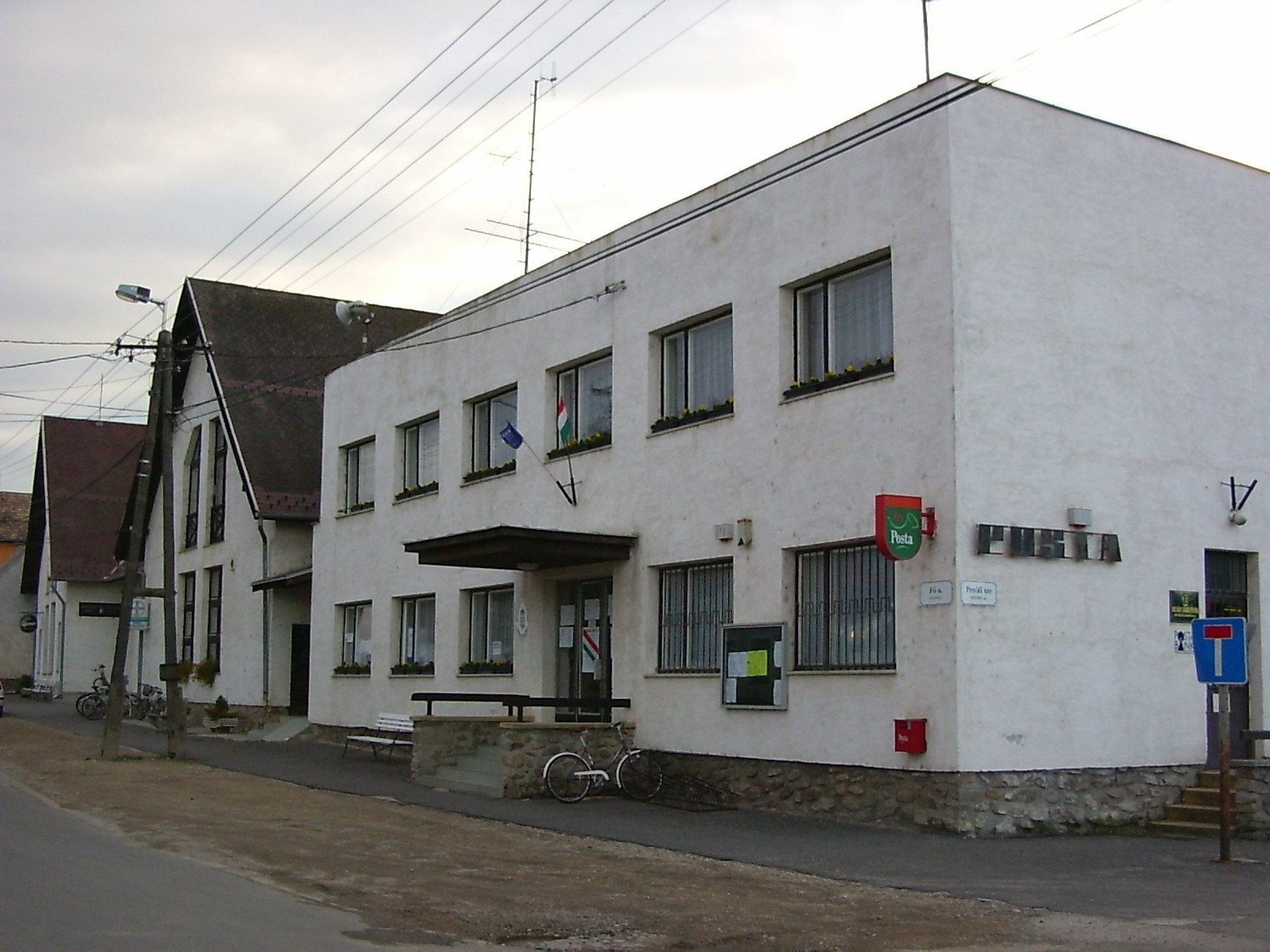
- Village hall

- Flag Coat of arms

- Location of Győr-Moson-Sopron county in Hungary

- Location of Kópháza
- Coordinates: 47°38′17″N 16°38′34″E
- Country: Hungary
- County: Győr-Moson-Sopron

Government
  - Mayor: Grubits Ferenc (Fidesz-KDNP)

Area
  - Total: 8.73 km^{2} (3.37 sq mi)

Population (2022)
  - Total: 2,028
  - Density: 232/km^{2} (602/sq mi)
- Time zone: UTC+1 (CET)
  - Summer (DST): UTC+2 (CEST)
- Postal code: 9495
- Area code: 99
- Website: www.kophaza.hu

Kópháza (Croatian: Koljnof) is a village in Győr-Moson-Sopron County, Hungary.
