= Hidegség =

- Flag Coat of arms

- Location of Győr-Moson-Sopron county in Hungary

- Location of Hidegség
- Coordinates: 47.62752°N 16.74144°E
- Country: Hungary
- County: Győr-Moson-Sopron

Area
  - Total: 16.81 km^{2} (6.49 sq mi)

Population (2004)
  - Total: 314
  - Density: 18.67/km^{2} (48.4/sq mi)
- Time zone: UTC+1 (CET)
  - Summer (DST): UTC+2 (CEST)
- Postal code: 9491
- Area code: 99

Hidegség (Croatian: Vedešin) is a village in Győr-Moson-Sopron county, Hungary.

== Sightseeing for visitors: the old church of Árpád age ==
In the village there is an old architectural heritage from the romanesque art: the church standing on the top of the hill above the village. The church consists of two parts. Older is the rotunda on the east side of the recent building. Younger is, although it is also of Árpád age, the village romanesque church with murals. Special arrangement of the Hidegség parochial church, that all the rotund is built inside the rectangular building, so the rotunda is invisible looking the church from outside. There are beautiful mural paintings in the rotunda of Hidegség, it is also an important artistic heritage from the 13th century in Hungary.

The architectural arrangement of the Hidegség parochial church has several relatives of this type in the Carpathian Basin: Herencsény, Bagod-Szentpál, Herencsény. Another group of such extended rotunda old parochial churches have a specific characteristic: the six folded inner structure of Karcsa, Gerény and Kiszombor.
