= Fertőhomok =

Fertőhomok Umok
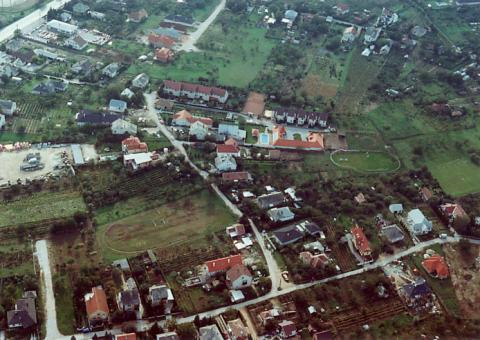
- Aerial photograph of Fertőhomok

- Coat of arms

- Location of Győr-Moson-Sopron county in Hungary

- Location of Fertőhomok
- Coordinates: 47.6196363°N 16.7710445°E
- Country: Hungary
- County: Győr-Moson-Sopron

Area
  - Total: 12.61 km^{2} (4.87 sq mi)

Population (2004)
  - Total: 561
  - Density: 44.48/km^{2} (115.2/sq mi)
- Time zone: UTC+1 (CET)
  - Summer (DST): UTC+2 (CEST)
- Postal code: 9492
- Area code: 99

Fertőhomok (Croatian: Umok) is a village in Győr-Moson-Sopron County, Hungary.
