= Fertőboz =

Fertőboz Holling
- Flag Coat of arms

- Location of Győr-Moson-Sopron county in Hungary

- Location of Fertőboz
- Coordinates: 47.63666°N 16.69926°E
- Country: Hungary
- County: Győr-Moson-Sopron

Area
  - Total: 13.63 km^{2} (5.26 sq mi)

Population (2004)
  - Total: 256
  - Density: 18.78/km^{2} (48.6/sq mi)
- Time zone: UTC+1 (CET)
  - Summer (DST): UTC+2 (CEST)
- Postal code: 9493
- Area code: 99

Fertőboz (German: Holling) is a village in Győr-Moson-Sopron county, Hungary.
