= Nagycenk =

- Large village
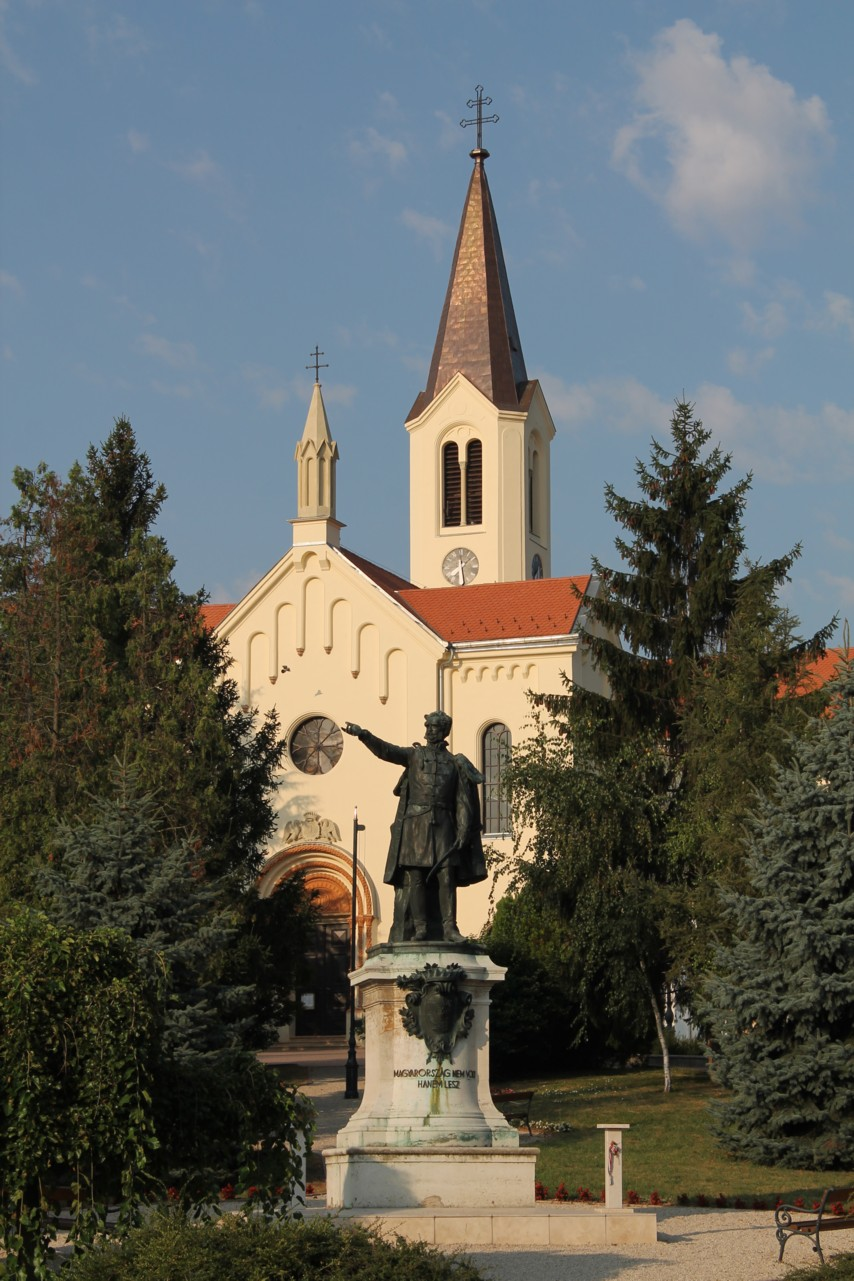
- Saint Stephen's Church and the statue of Count István Széchenyi, Nagycenk

- Coat of arms

- Location of Győr-Moson-Sopron county in Hungary

- Location within Győr-Moson-Sopron County Location within Hungary
- Coordinates: 47.6000°N 16.7000°E
- Country: Hungary
- Region: Western Transdanubia
- County: Győr-Moson-Sopron
- District: Sopron

Area
  - Total: 19.45 km^{2} (7.51 sq mi)

Population (2022)
  - Total: 2,767
  - Density: 142.26/km^{2} (368.5/sq mi)
- Time zone: UTC+1 (CET)
  - Summer (DST): UTC+2 (CEST)
- Postal code: 9485
- Area code: (+36) 99
- Website: www.nagycenk.hu

Nagycenk is a large village in Győr-Moson-Sopron county in Hungary, on the Austrian border, near Sopron and the Lake Neusiedl/Lake Fertő.

== Places of interest ==
- Saint Stephen's Church
- Széchenyi Mansion
- Széchenyi Mausoleum
- Széchenyi Railway Museum

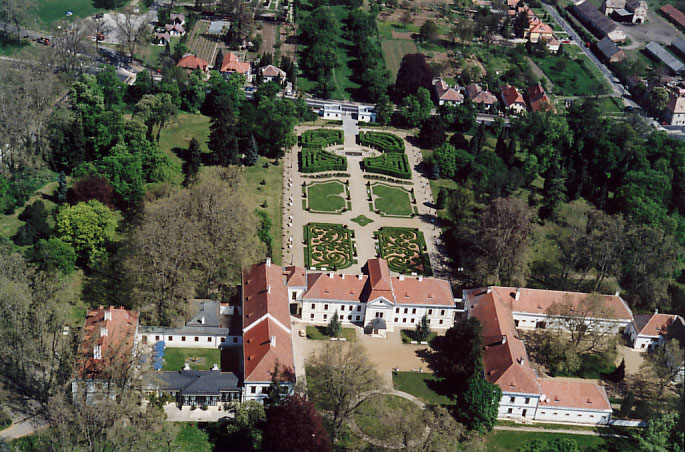
Aerial photograph of Széchenyi Mansion
