= History of the Jews in Sopron =

Aspect of Jewish history in Hungary

Sopron (German: Ödenburg, Latin: Scarbantia) was historically the capital of a district with the same name. It was home to a Jewish community, according to a document of 1526, which dated back from the 10th century and is one of the oldest in Hungary.

The town was destroyed by fire in 1317. Charles Robert invited Jewish colonists into the town in 1324; they lived there in peace until 1354, when they were expelled by Louis the Great. Most of them went to Austria and settled in Wiener-Neustadt. A few years afterward they were allowed to return, and in 1379 the Jewish population in Oedenburg amounted to 80, reaching 400 toward the end of the 15th century. Recognizing that the Jews constituted a valuable fiscal asset, Frederick III, to whom Elizabeth had mortgaged Oedenburg, took energetic measures to protect the Jews there against the aggression of their Christian fellow citizens and prevent their expulsion (1441). In 1490 the citizens of Oedenburg seized upon the Jews and cast them into prison with the declared intention of keeping them there until they consented to cancel the obligations of their Christian debtors; John Corvinus and Beatrix, however, took them under their protection.

== Expulsion in 1526 ==
Beginning with the 16th century the lot of the Jews in Oedenburg grew constantly worse, and they were often assailed by the people in spite of the "protection" of the feeble King Louis II. In 1526, after the battle of Mohács, they were expelled, their houses were broken into and plundered, and the so-called "Jews' account-book", in which the legally certified debts of the Christians were entered, was destroyed. Even the cemetery and the synagogue were wrecked. Some of the volumes now in the municipal archives of Oedenburg are covered with parchment that once constituted parts of books destroyed on this occasion. All these raids occurred with the consent of the mayor and the city council. The expelled Jews fled principally to Eisenstadt, Mattersdorf, and Kobersdorf, where they instituted suits for damages against the city of Ödenburg. The litigation lasted for 8 years and was decided partially in their favor, though their demand to be readmitted was rejected, Ferdinand I., on September 12, 1534, authorizing Oedenburg to refuse to readmit them. They were, however, allowed to visit the fairs and to peddle in the city. In 1615 peddling also was forbidden. Some time afterward it happened that they gained the favor of Paul I, 1st Prince Esterházy of Galántha, who was at this time prefect of the county of Oedenburg; he brought his influence to bear upon the city council in behalf of the Jews, with the result that in 1665 they were permitted to enter the city on Tuesdays and Wednesdays on presentation of a ticket, for which they had to pay 8 pfennig; but only one Jew was allowed to enter the city at a time.

== Conditional Readmission ==
In 1740, at the insistence of Counts Esterházy, Batthyány, and Draskovits, the city granted permission to all Jews of the counties of Sopron and Eisenstadt to enter the city. By 1766 they were allowed to remain in the town from Monday to Friday continuously, and carry on business. The city on its own accord granted them permission to secure a separate lodging-house and a cook-shop; but for this privilege they paid at first 270 gulden, and later 1,071 gulden (1804). They were not permitted, however, to set up permanent households. Even as late as 1813 it was the law that whoever rented a dwelling-house or a storeroom to a Jew for an extended term would be fined 100 gulden; a 2nd offense of the same nature entailed loss of the privileges of citizenship. But in spite of such severe measures the citizens continued to rent houses to Jews; in 1818 the latter even possessed a place of prayer.

The number of Jews ― the so-called "tolerated" Jews ― there in 1830 was 37. It was only, however, after the promulgation of the law of 1840, granting Jews unrestricted entrance into the free cities, that the Jewish population of Oedenburg began to increase steadily. Most of the immigrants came from the very places to which the Jews had previously fled, as Eisenstadt, Lackenbach, Kobersdorf, Heiligen-Kreuz, and Mattersdorf.

There were 180 Jews in Sopron in 1855
854 in 1869
1,152 in 1881
1,632 in 1891
2,400 in 1900, out of a total population of 33,478

It is singular that, while, according to the statistics for 1891, the general population showed a proportion of 1,172 females to 1,000 males, in the case of the Jews the numbers were 843 males and 780 females.

The 1st Jewish cemetery was laid out in 1869, and the 1st to be buried there was Hermann Seidler, whose son, a convert to Christianity, was raised to the Austrian baronetcy; in 1902 the cemetery was considerably enlarged.

The first synagogue (Neolog Judaism) was built in 1876, the second (Orthodox Judaism) in 1891. The Chevra kadisha, established in 1869, was jointly supported by the two congregations; as was the Jewish grammar-school, which in 1902 had an attendance of 230 Jewish children. Other Jewish institutions were:

- Maskil el Dal Society
- Women's Association
- Deák Aid Society
- Noble Hearts Society
- Penny Society
- Niḥum Abelim Society

== Rabbis ==
Among the rabbis of Oedenburg have been the following:

- Rabbi Meir (toward end of 14th century; often referred to by Jacob Mölln)
- Rabbi Kalman
- Rabbi Gedl (about middle of 15th century)
- Rabbi Judah (toward end of 15th century; mentioned by Gedaliah ibn Yaḥya as among the great Ashkenazic rabbis)
- Rabbi Jacob (son of Rabbi Isaac of Prague; officiated in 1490)
- Rabbi Merhell ("Rabbi Yud" 1503)
- Lazar Alt (1868–1872)
- Max Elias (1872–1894)
- Dr. Max Pollák who was elected in 1894.

== Since 1900s ==
=== The Holocaust ===
In 1945, the Jewish labor camp workers from Kosice (then part of Hungary) were forced by their Hungarian officers to retreat on foot to Sopron, a distance of over 100 miles. Conditions were terrible for these young Jewish men. Many died from starvation and disease, others from the unusually cold winter. On April 1, 1945 in Sopron the Russians entered and liberated the few Jewish labor camp workers who had survived out of the original group of about 300. They were now free to go.

== 1945-2000s ==
During World War II, following the German occupation on March 19, 1944, the Jewish population of Sopron, which numbered 1,861 in 1941, was confined to a ghetto. On July 5, approximately 3,000 Jews, including those from the surrounding areas, were deported to the Auschwitz death camp. Only a small number of individuals returned from this deportation. It is noted that even after the deportation, the residents of Sopron did not offer assistance to the thousands of Jews passing through the town from forced labor camps on their way to death camps in Germany.

After the war, the Jewish population in Sopron significantly decreased, with only 274 Jews recorded in the city in 1946 and a further decline to just 47 individuals by 1970. These numbers reflect the tragic impact of the Holocaust on the Jewish community of Sopron during this period.

== Jewish figures from Sopron ==
- The diplomatist and poet Baron Louis Dóczy (Dux) was born there (November 5, 1845 - )
- John Alton (October 5, 1905-), cinematographer
