= Dóczi =

Dóczi is a surname. Notable people with the surname include:

- István Dóczi (born 1965), Hungarian water polo player
- Krisztián Dóczi (born 1989), Hungarian footballer
- Lajos Dóczi (1845–1918), Hungarian poet and journalist
