= Marie Renard =

Austrian opera singer (1864–1939)

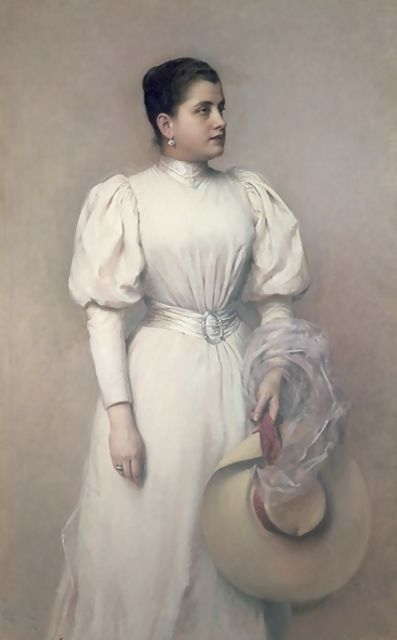
Marie Renard

Marie Renard (8 January 1864 – 19 October 1939) was an Austrian operatic mezzo-soprano, later soprano.

== Early training and career ==
Born Marie Pölzl, she first studied voice with Louise Weinlich-Tipka in her native city of Graz and later in Berlin with Rosa de Ruda. She debuted in 1882 in Graz as Azucena in Verdi's Il trovatore, filling in for another singer, and was engaged there until 1884. The following season (1884–1885) she sang at the German Theatre in Prague. After making guest appearances in the title roles of Bizet's Carmen and Ambroise Thomas' Mignon at the Berlin Hofoper in 1885, she became a member of that company from 1885 to 1888 and sang there in the premiere of Heinrich Hofmann's Donna Diana on 15 November 1886.

== Vienna ==
In 1888 she was engaged at the Vienna Hofoper with an annual salary of 16,000 florins. She reached the peak of her career and popularity with that company. She was prized above all for her portrayals of roles in French operas (sung in German), in particular as Carmen. In 1889 she sang in Vienna in Carl Maria von Weber's Die drei Pintos (in the version completed by Gustav Mahler). In 1890 she sang the title role in the first Viennese performance of Massenet's Manon. On 1 January 1892 she sang Eva in the world premiere of Ritter Pázmán by Johann Strauss II. One of her most memorable performances was as Charlotte in the world premiere of Massenet's Werther on 16 February 1892 (performed in German). She also sang Frau Dot in the world premiere of Goldmark's Das Heimchen am Herd (21 March 1896) and Tatjana in the first Viennese performance of Tchaikovsky's Eugene Onegin (1897).

Other roles in Vienna included Cherubino in Figaros Hochzeit (Mozart's Le nozze di Figaro in German), Zerlina in Mozart's Don Giovanni, the title roles in Mignon by Thomas and Djamileh by Bizet, Ännchen in Weber's Der Freischütz, Angela in Auber's Le domino noir, Rosalinde in Die Fledermaus by Johann Strauss II, Musetta in Puccini's La bohème, and Hänsel in Humperdinck's Hänsel und Gretel. Her farewell performance was in 1900 as Carmen.

After her retirement she married Count Rudolf Kinsky. She died in her native city of Graz.

== Sources ==
- Kutsch, K. J. and Riemens, Leo (2003). Großes Sängerlexikon (fourth edition, in German), p. 3891. Munich: K. G. Saur. ISBN 978-3-598-11598-1.
- C. Höslinger: "Renard Marie". In: Österreichisches Biographisches Lexikon 1815–1950 (ÖBL). Vol. 9, Austrian Academy of Sciences, Vienna 1988, ISBN 3-7001-1483-4, p. 77.
- Ludwig Eisenberg: Großes biographisches Lexikon der deutschen Bühne des XIX. Jahrhunderts. List, Leipzig 1903, p. 818–819.
- Carl Hagemann: Marie Renard. 1940
