= Ritter Pázmán =

1892 opera by Johann Strauss II

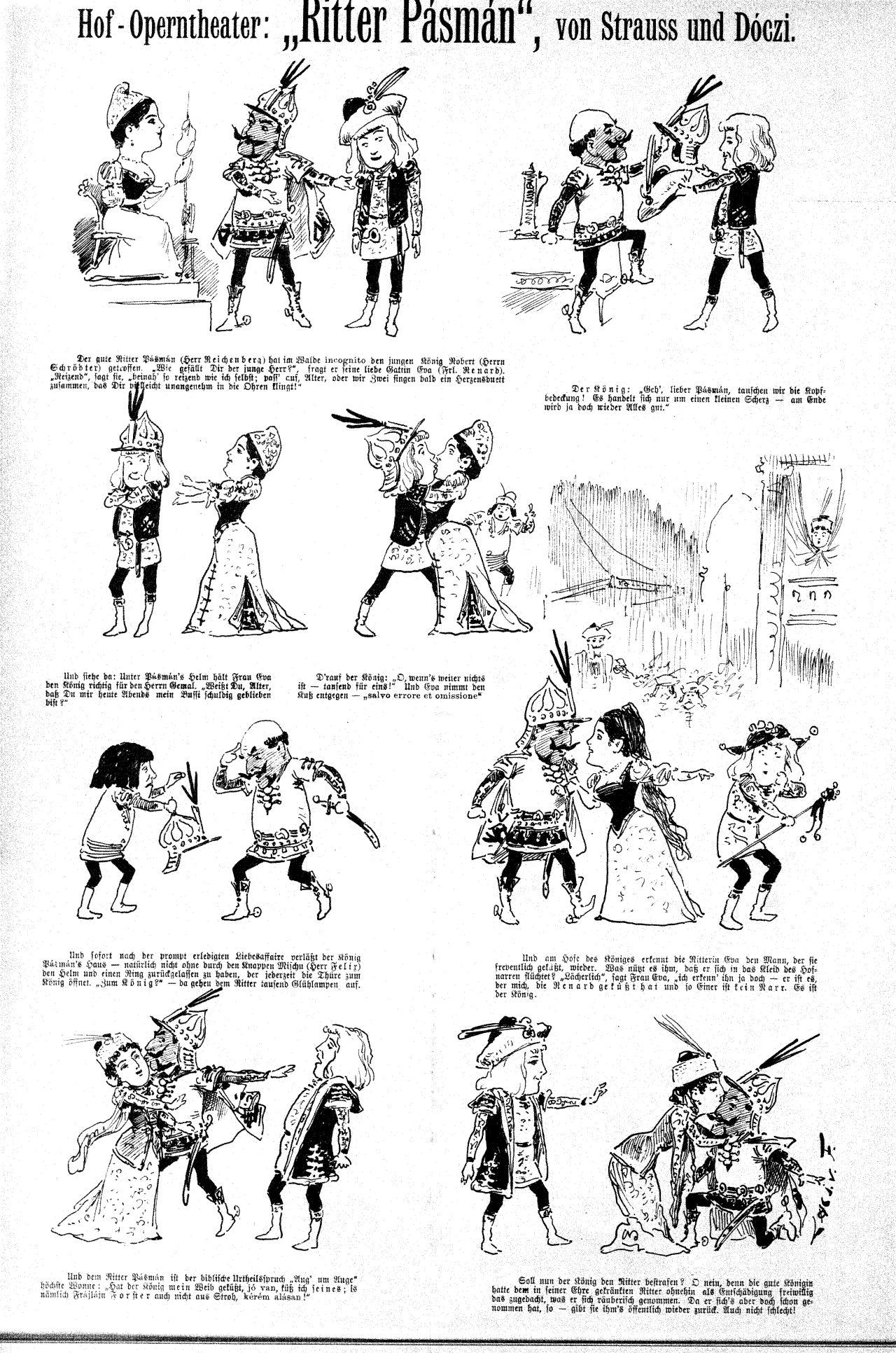
Illustration of the operetta in the Austrian magazine Die Bombe (1892)

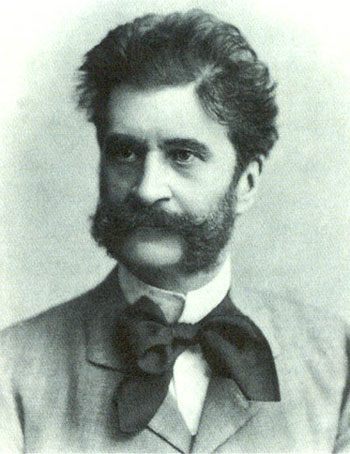
Johann Strauss II

Ritter Pázmán (Knight Pazman) is a three-act comic opera composed by Johann Strauss II, with the libretto by Ludwig Dóczi. It premiered at the prestigious Hofoper in Vienna on New Year's Day, 1892. It is based on a Hungarian narrative poem, Pázmán lovag, by the Hungarian poet János Arany. A performance takes about three hours.

== Roles ==
Roles, voice type, premiere cast
Role	Voice type	Premiere cast, 1 January 1892 Conductor: Johann Strauss II
Pázmán	bass	Franz von Reichenberg
Eva	mezzo-soprano	Marie Renard
Gundy	contralto	Josefine von Artner
Karl Robert of Anjou	tenor	Fritz Schrödter
Mischu	tenor	Benedikt Felix
Omodé	tenor	Anton Schittenhelm
Rodomonte	baritone	Josef Ritter
The queen	soprano	Ellen Brandt-Forster

== Synopsis ==
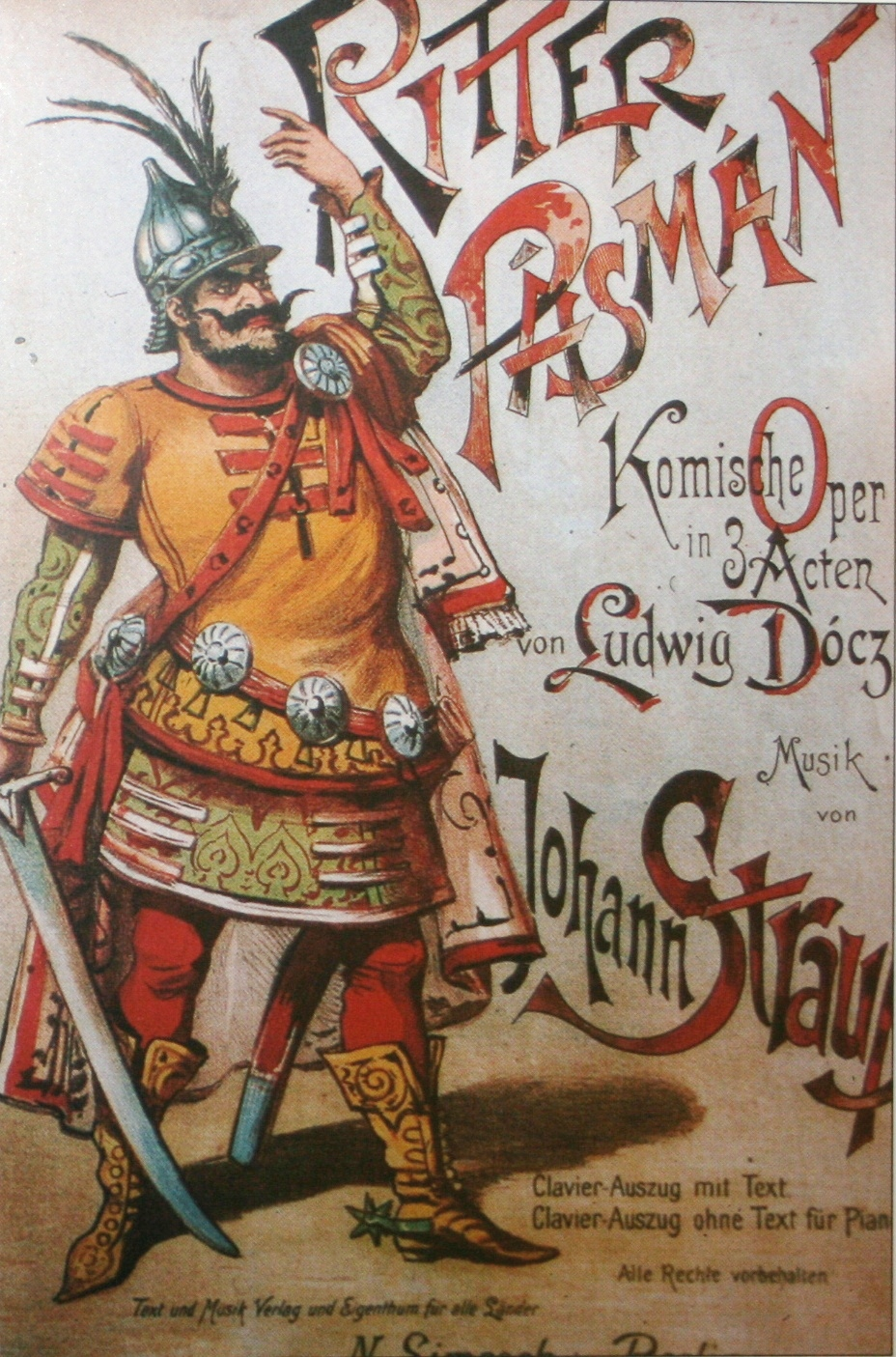
Cover of piano reduction

Place: Hungary
Time: Beginning of the 14th century

=== Acts 1 and 2 ===
Pázmán's castle

The knight's wife and servants are hurrying to prepare a meal to welcome Pázmán and his band on their way back from the hunt. One of the hunters falls in love with the knight's wife, and kisses her on the forehead when the husband is not looking. Later, after the hunter leaves, Pázmán finds out about the kiss, and, having cursed his wife, goes to the king to demand justice.

=== Act 3 ===
The King's castle

The knight was followed by his wife and maid. He insists that he be allowed to kiss the hunter's wife as revenge. The king then says that he was the one who kissed Pázmán's wife. Pázmán is then allowed to take a kiss from the queen.

== Public reception ==
When the opera's debut was announced, it was met with great enthusiasm, as was the case with most of Strauss' works, and it attracted special attention because it was Strauss' first (and only) opera. Kevin Clarke writes, "Because the Viennese were curious about 'their' Strauss being performed in the 'holy' auditorium at the Ring, the first night was a mega-event with ticket prices skyrocketing."

However, at its premiere, it was received coldly, and most critics predicted that it would not last long at the opera house. The Vienna Opera played it only nine times. Critics complained about the banality of the opera's text, and a reviewer for the Wiener Abendpost commented that the characters were not distinguished enough musically. Others said that the opera died of "acute text failure". Some critics, however, such as Richard Heuberger, noted that the instrumentation of the opera was commendable, especially Strauss' use of the dulcimer in the csárdás.
