= Lajos Dóczi =

Hungarian poet (1845–1919)

Lajos Dóczy
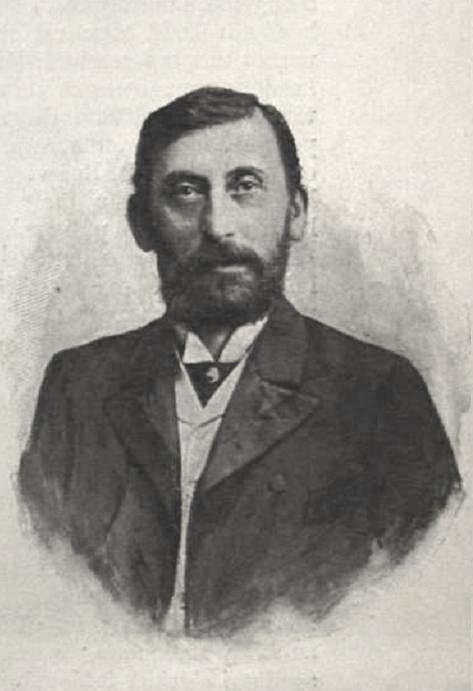
- Born: November 27, 1845; Sopron, Kingdom of Hungary, Austrian Empire
- Died: August 29, 1919 (aged 73); Budapest, Hungarian Republic
- Resting place: Fiume Road Graveyard
- Citizenship: Hungary
- Occupations: List: Linguist; Poet; Translator; Journalist; Librettist; Writer; Playwright

Baron Lajos Dóczi, aka Dóczy (Hungarian: Dóczi Lajos, báró, German: Ludwig (Louis) Dóczy (born "Dux"), 29/30 November 1845 in Sopron (Oedenburg) – 28 August 1918 in Budapest) was a Jewish (later Christian) Hungarian poet and journalist. His father, Adolf Dux, was a wine trader, not to be confused with the writer of the same name, Adolf Dux.

== Biography ==
His father was Mór Dux, a leather merchant who went bankrupt during the War of Independence. His mother was Róza Rosenberg. His father, after the assets of unfortunate companies were completely ruined during the War of Independence, moved with his family to Németkeresztúr and joined the shop of his brother-in-law, Mór Rosenberg as a business manager. From there, his son Lajos went to Nagykanizsa to see Mrs. Lövinger, his mother's sister, in whose elementary Jewish school he completed the six elementary classes; then in Keresztúr he was initiated into the Talmudic sciences by the teacher of the village. In 1856, his parents sent him to the grammar school in Sopron, where he became the leader of the youth together with Jenő Rákosi. After completing his secondary school studies, he studied law at the University of Vienna and became a member of the editorial board of the Presse. He reported on the coronation to the Presse, and his articles caused a great sensation. As a correspondent, he became the centre of the literary society whose lifeblood was Adolf Ágai, Lajos Asbóth, László Hevesi, Ivor Kaas, Manó Kónyi, Tóbiás Lőw and Jenő Rákosi. He also constantly wrote for the then high-level political satirical magazine Borsszem Jankó, and at the same time he was an enthusiastic defender of Ferenc Deák's politics in newspaper articles. In 1868, Boldizsár Horvát ordered him to the Prime Minister's Office as a draftsman, but as early as 1872, Count Gyula Andrássy, Minister of Foreign Affairs, took him to Vienna, and Dóczi soon became a Hungarian court counsellor and ministerial class counsellor. At the same time, he was a member of the Kisfaludy and Petőfi Societies. On 8 June 1878, he was elected to the nobility, then 1900. On 13 March, he received the title of baron and the noble prefix "Németkeresztúr" from Franz Joseph I, King of Hungary.

He never interrupted his journalistic activities. He was a contributor to the Presse, the Pesti Napló, the Hírmondó, the Reform and the Fremdenblatt.

== Career ==
After finishing his preliminary education he studied law in Vienna, joining at the same time the staff of Die Presse. His political articles, which advocated the "Ausgleich" (agreement) with Austria, were very favorably received, and on the recommendation of Balthasar Horváth, then Minister of Justice, he was appointed (1868) clerk in the office of the prime minister.

When Count Julius Andrássy became minister of foreign affairs (1872) Dóczy accompanied him to Vienna, and was soon appointed "Sectionsrath", and later "Hofrath", at the Foreign Office. In 1899, he was elevated to the rank of baron, and in 1902, retired from public life. He resided in Deutschkreutz and Budapest.

== Marriage and descendants ==
He married Ilona Mayer von Gunthof (*Vienna, 2 September 1862 – Vienna, 6 June 1930) on 20 October 1879, in Vienna. He divorced his wife on 9 October 1891.

Child:

- Baron Péter Gyula Dóczy (*Vienna, 26 October 1881 – Bad Ischl, 26 December 1962). His wife, Baron Suzanne von Ferstel (11 February 1895 – 13 May 1974) was a Hungarian politician.

== Works ==
Dóczy's reputation rests not on the services he rendered to the state, but on his achievements as a dramatic writer and as a translator. His plays were staged one after the other: The Last Prophet (dealing with the destruction of Jerusalem, premiered in Buda in 1869); Kiss (Teleky Prize-winning comedy, National Theatre, 1874; Burgtheater 1877); Last Love (comedy, National Theatre 1884; Burgtheater 1885); Mária Széchy (historical drama, National Theatre 1886); Mixed Couples (comedy, National Theatre, 1889); Countess Vera (tragedy). He made himself famous with his translation of Faust (1872) in 1887, when the National Theatre performed it in Hungarian for the first time in his translation. However, he was the seventh to translate Imre Madách's The Tragedy of Man (1892, premiered in Hamburg) into German. His comedy Princess Ellinor (1896) won the Teleki Prize. He was a contributor to all the significant Hungarian-language literary and daily newspapers of the time. His writings published in the Neues Pester Journal under the pseudonym Tobiás Onkel were especially popular. Other works: Anonymous Letters to Kálmán Tisza (1872); Poems (1890); Tales and Sketches (1890); Carmela Spadaro (short story, 1890); The complete poems of Friedrich Schiller (1902); Wallenstein trilogy (for the National Theatre, 1904); Goethe's Poems (1906). He translated many of the poems of János Arany and Mihály Vörösmarty into German, translated several opera texts into Hungarian, and wrote the text for the Knight Pázmány for Johann Strauss.

Besides these, he translated Schauffert's comedy Schach dem König, 1873, and wrote the libretto to Karl Goldmark's Merlin and to Johann Strauss II.'s Ritter Pázmán.

His Hungarian translation of Goethe's Faust and his German adaptation of Imre Madách's Az ember tragédiája (German: Die Tragödie des Menschen) were well received. His collected poems and novels appeared in 1890. His last work was a Hungarian translation of Schiller's poems (1902).

== Notable works ==
- Goethe, Faust. Tragedy translated into Hungarian, Part I. Pest, 1872. (There are fragments from Part II in his work entitled Poems, Budapest, 1890.)
- Anonymous letters to Kálmán Tisza on the occasion of the new program. Ibid., 1872. (Reprint from the Reform.)
- Chess for the King, comedy in 4 acts. After Schauffert, trans. Dux L. Ibid., 1873. (National Theatre Library 27.)
- Kiss, merry. 4 acts. Bpest, 1874. (Ism. Petőfi Társaság Lapja, 1877, No. 11, Inspector No. 62, 2nd edition, 1878, Vol. 3, 1881, Vol. 4, 1886, Vol. 5, 1891. Ibid., in German, Vienna, 1879.)
- Last love, broken. comedy. Ibid. 1880. (2nd revised edition. Ibid. 1888. German. Leipzig, 1887 and Stuttgart, 1891.)
- Mária Széchy, broken. play. Ibid. 1885. (Ism. P. Diary, No. 349, sat. In German: Stuttgart, 1891.)
- Merlin, song work 3 acts. trans., music by Goldmark. Ibid. (1887. Library of the Royal Opera House.)
- Mixed Couples, Drama 3 acts. Ibid. 1889.
- Poems. Ibid. 1890. (Ism. Főv. L. 1889, No. 341, 351, Nemzet, No. 341.)
- Talks and sketches. Ibid. 1890. Two volumes. (Ism. Nemzet 1889. No. 314. Bud. Hírlap No. 317. Bud. Review LXI.)
- Carmela Spadaro. Short stories. Stuttgart, 1890.
- Countess Vera, sad. 3 acts. Ibid. 1891. (Szépirod. Library II.)
- Die Tragödie des menschen. Dramatisches Gedicht von Emerich Madách. Hey them kids. übersetz. Ibid. 1891. (2nd ed. Ibid. 1892.)
