= Leopold Dukes =

Hungarian critic (1810–1891)

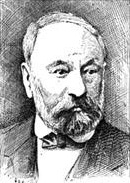
- Portrait of Leopold Dukes, c.1906
- Born: Dukes Lipót; January 17, 1810; Pozsony, Kingdom of Hungary
- Died: August 3, 1891 (aged 81); Vienna, Austria-Hungary
- Occupations: Critic of Jewish literature, philologist
- Known for: Research on medieval Hebrew poetry

Leopold Dukes (Hungarian: Dukes Lipót; 17 January 1810, Pozsony – 3 August 1891, Vienna) was a Hungarian critic of Jewish literature.

== Biography ==
Dukes spent about 20 years in England, and from his researches in the Bodleian Library and the British Museum (which contain two of the most valuable Hebrew libraries in the world) Dukes was able to complete the work of Leopold Zunz. The most popular work of Dukes was his Rabbinische Blumenlese (1844), in which he collected the rabbinic proverbs and illustrated them from the gnomic literatures of other peoples.

Dukes made many contributions to philology, but his best work was connected with the medieval Hebrew poetry, especially Ibn Gabirol.

== See also ==
- Adolf Dux
