= Daughters of the Divine Redeemer =

Order of Catholic nuns

The Daughters of the Divine Redeemer are a congregation of Roman Catholic nuns, with a motherhouse at Ödenburg, Hungary; they were founded in 1863 from the Daughters of the Divine Saviour of Vienna.
