= Sopron =

Place in Western Transdanubia, Hungary

Sopron Ödenburg
- Sopron Megyei Jogú Város
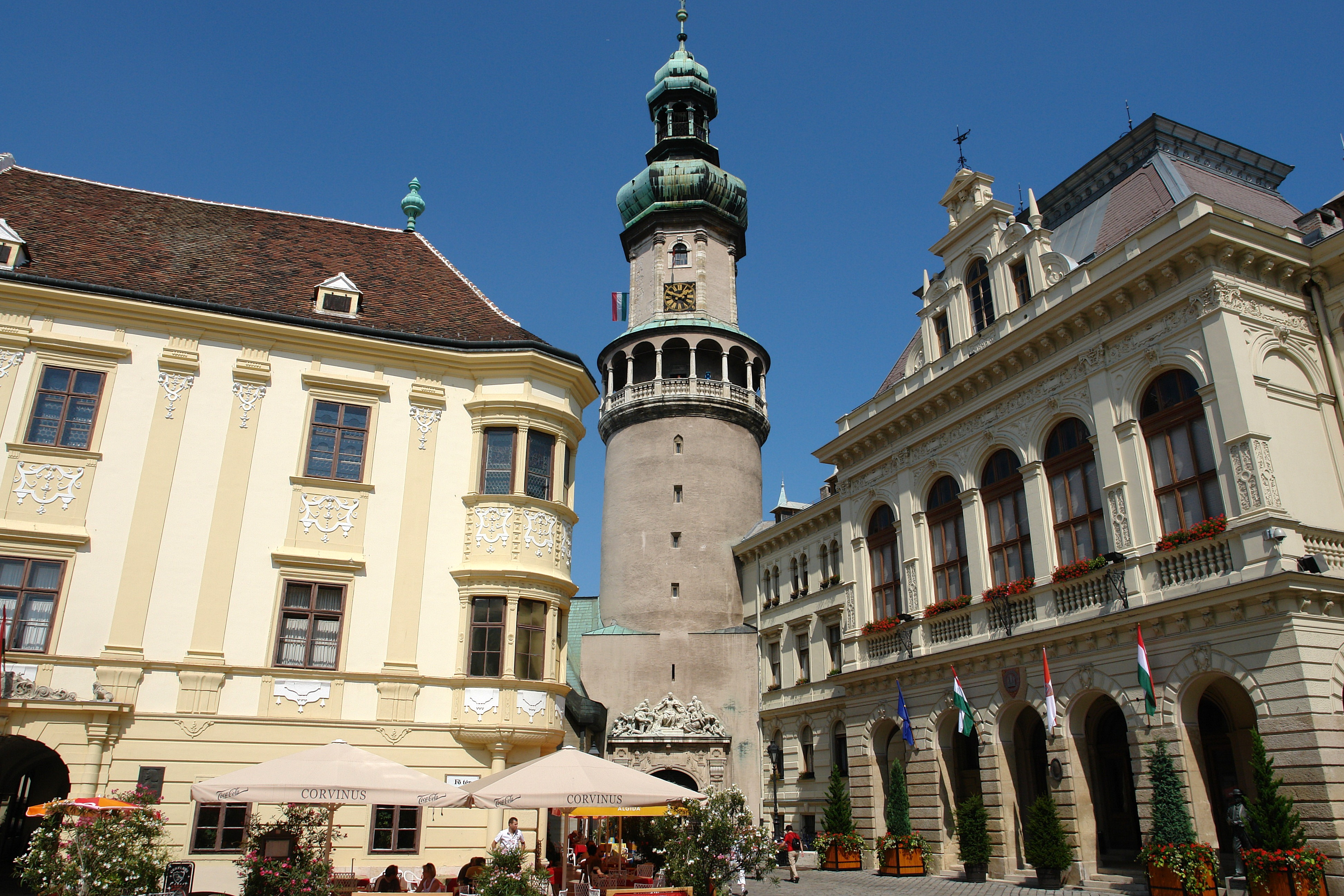
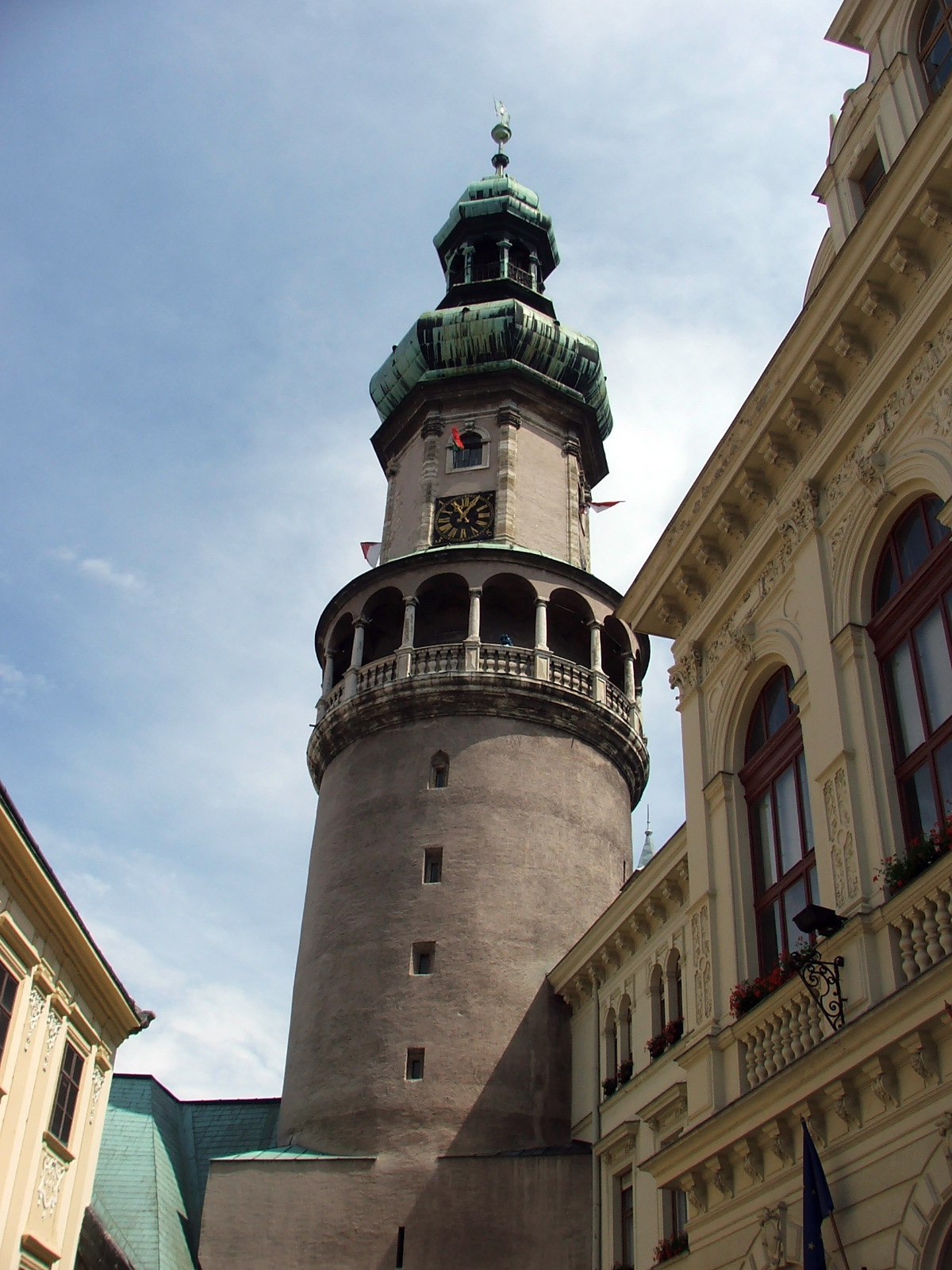
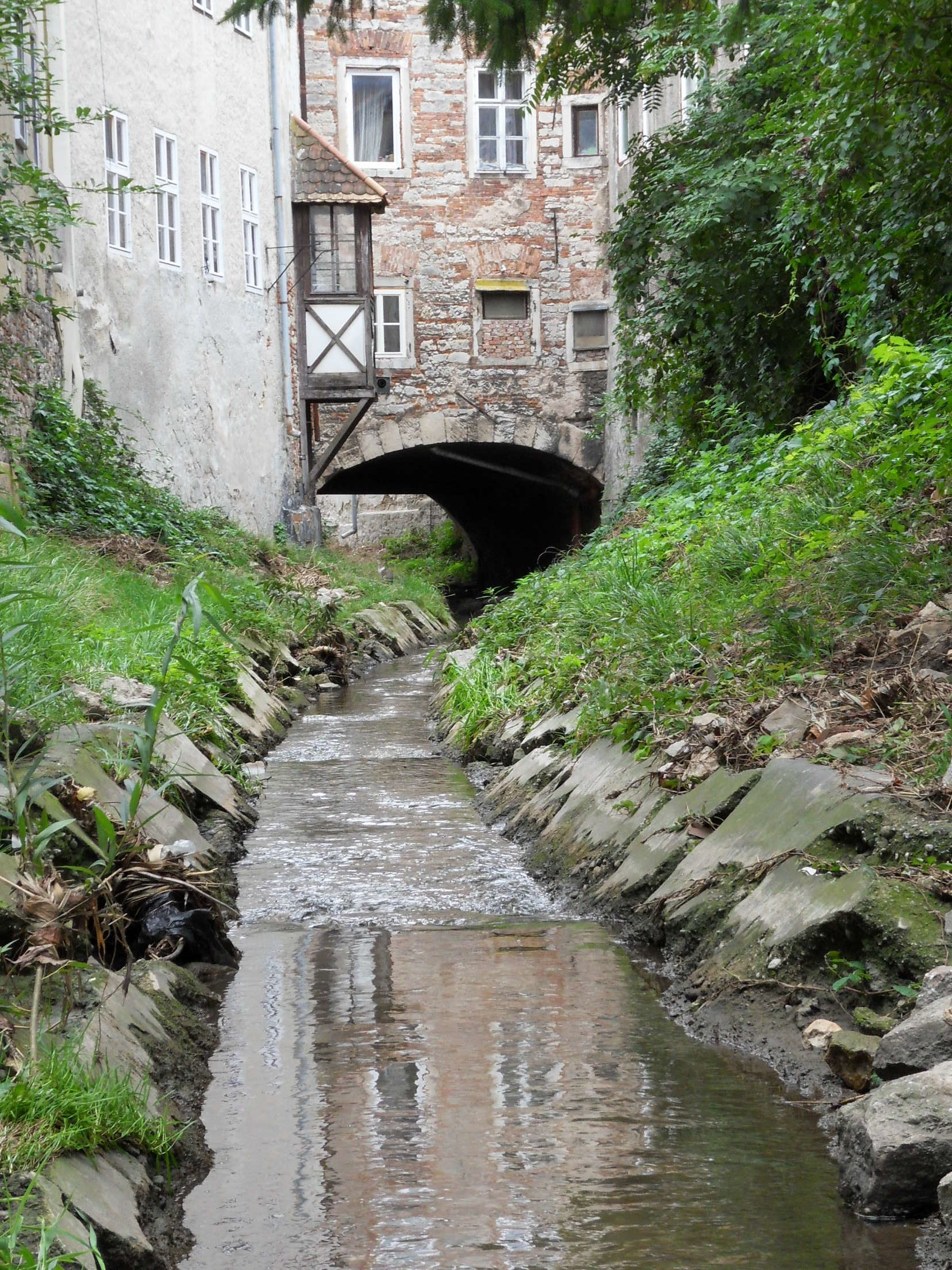
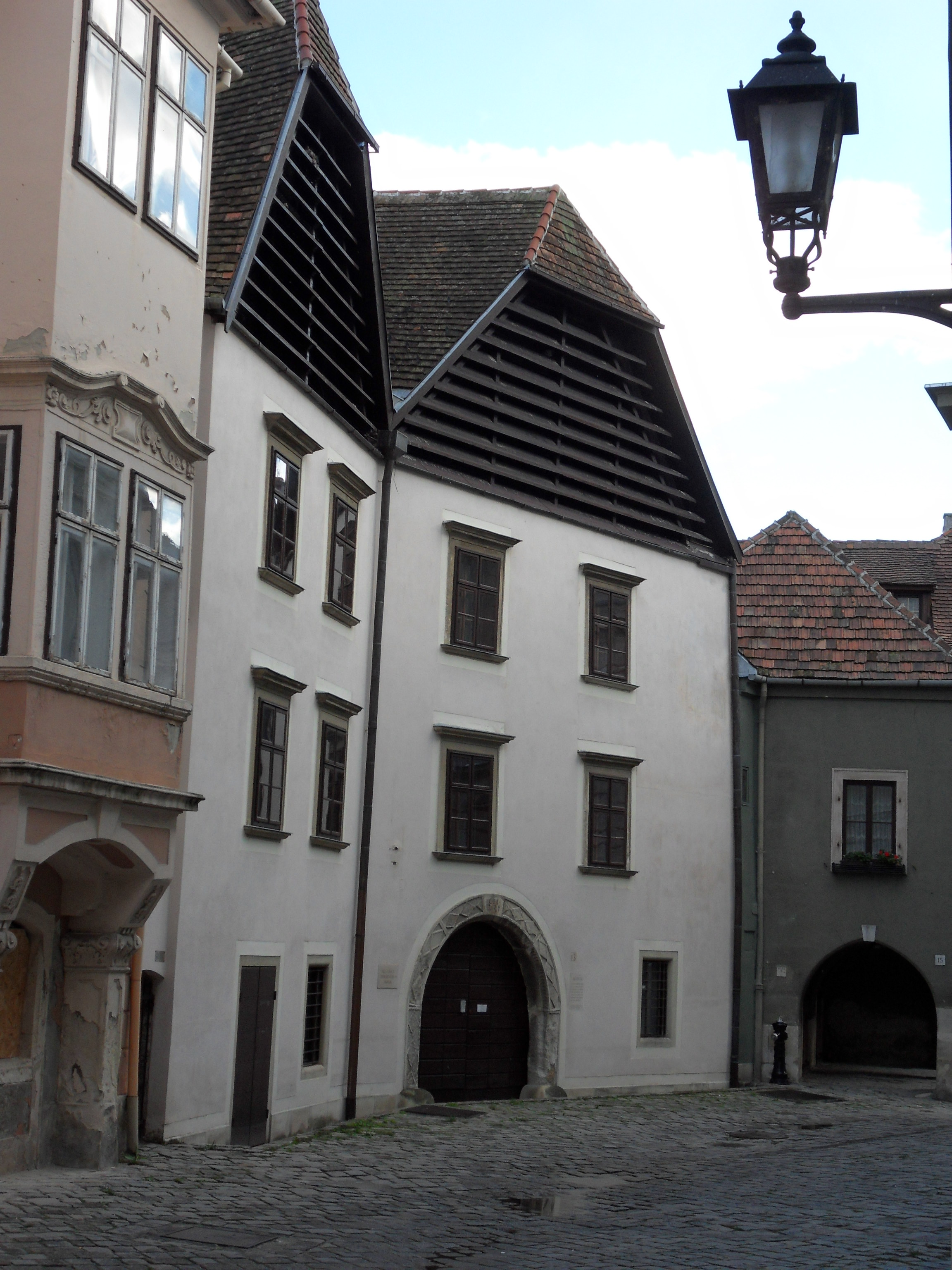
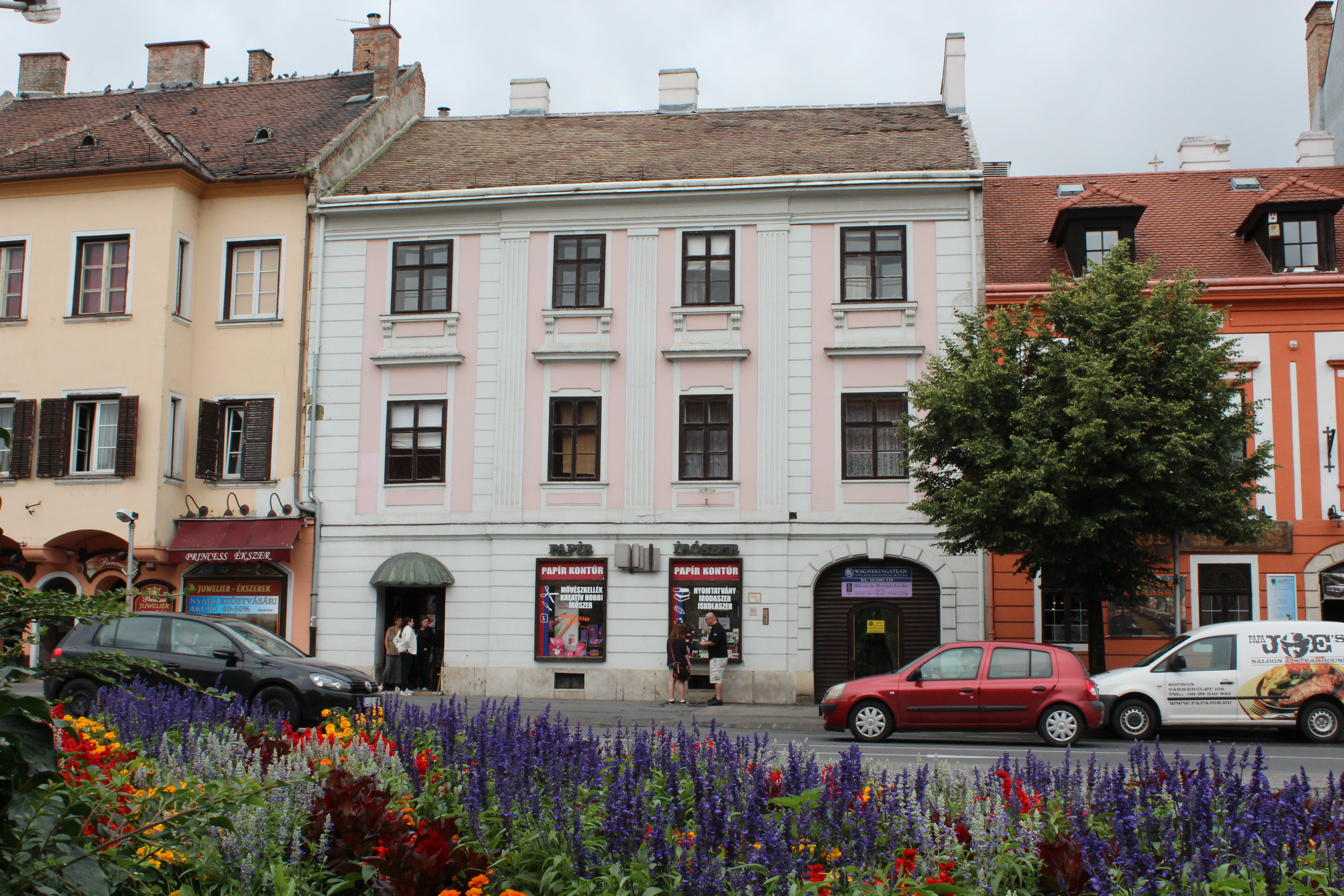
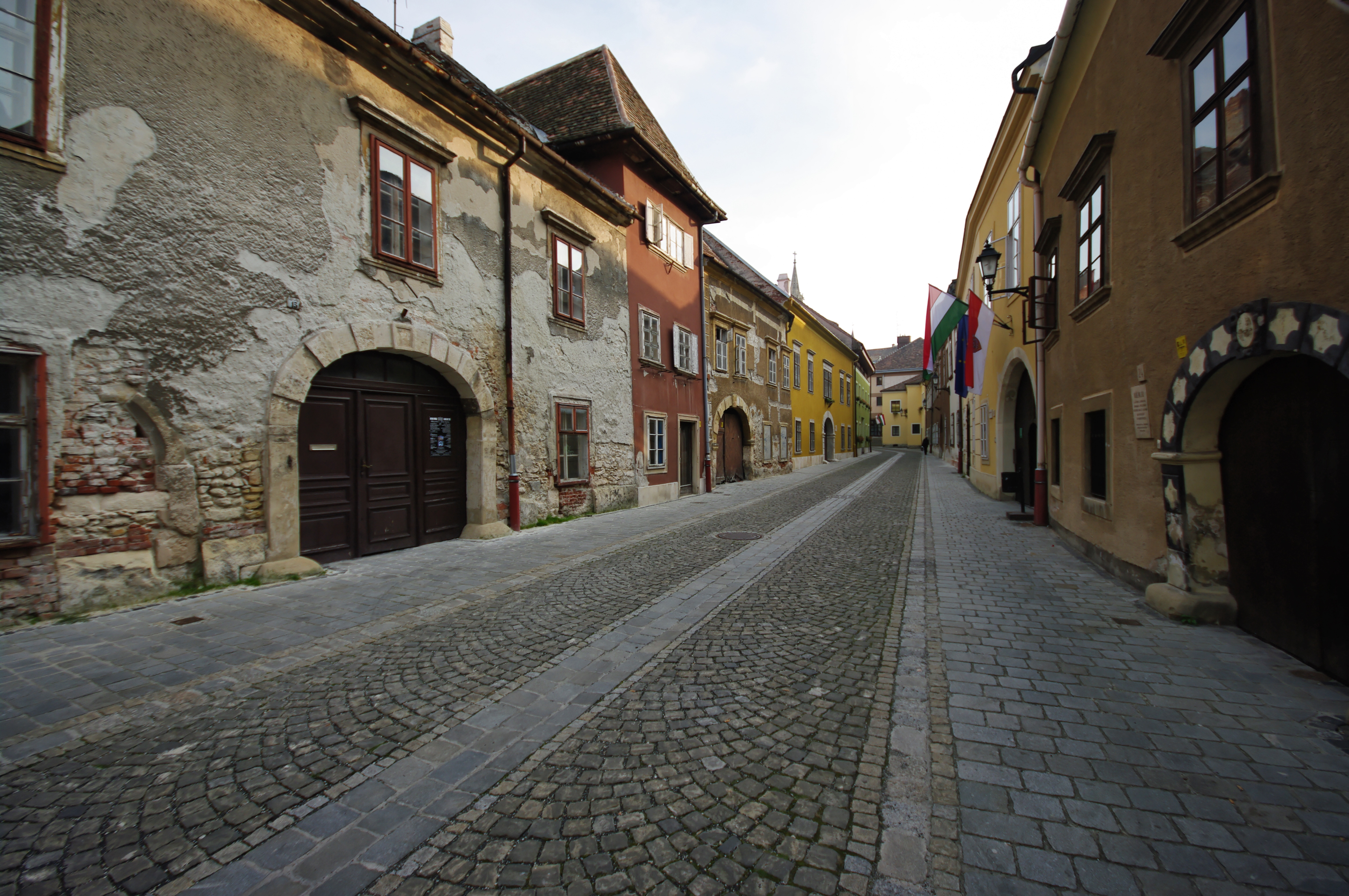

- Flag Coat of arms
- Nickname: Civitas Fidelissima (Most Loyal City/Citizenry)
- Location of Sopron Sopron (Hungary)
- Coordinates: 47.68489°N 16.58305°E
- Country: Hungary
- Region: Western Transdanubia
- County: Győr–Moson–Sopron
- District: Sopron
- Established: 2nd century AD (Scarbantia)
- Re-Established: 9th century AD (Sopron)
- City status: 1277

Government
  - Mayor: Dr. Ciprián Farkas (Fidesz-KDNP)
  - Deputy Mayor: Dr. István Simon (Fidesz-KDNP)
  - Town Notary: Dr. Szabolcs Sárvári

Area
  - City: 169.04 km^{2} (65.27 sq mi)

Population (2022)
  - City: 62,116
  - Rank: 15th
  - Density: 367.46/km^{2} (951.73/sq mi)
  - Urban: 98,479 (13th)
- Demonym: soproni

Population by ethnicity (2011)
  - Hungarians: 88.%
  - Germans: 5.7%
  - Croats: 0.7%
  - Romani: 0.6%
  - Romanians: 0.2%
  - Slovaks: 0.1%
  - Serbs: 0.1%
  - Bulgarians: 0.1%
  - Others: 0.9%

Population by religion (2011)
  - Roman Catholic: 47.9%
  - Greek Catholic: 1.6%
  - Evangelicals: 5.6%
  - Calvinists: 3%
  - Jewish: 1%
  - Non-religious: 5%
- Time zone: UTC+1 (CET)
  - Summer (DST): UTC+2 (CEST)
- Postal code: 9400
- Area code: (+36) 99
- Motorways: M85 Motorway
- NUTS 3 code: HU221
- Distance from Budapest: 214 km (133 mi) West
- MP: Dr. Anikó Hallerné Nagy (Tisza)
- Website: www.sopron.hu

Sopron (Hungarian pronunciation: [ˈʃopron]; German: Ödenburg, German pronunciation: [ˈøːdn̩ˌbʊʁk]) is a city in Hungary on the Austrian border, near Lake Neusiedl/Fertő.

== History ==
=== Ancient times-13th century ===
In the Iron Age a hilltop settlement with a burial ground existed in the neighbourhood of Sopron-Várhely.

When the area that is today Western Hungary was a province of the Roman Empire, a city called Scarbantia stood here. The site of its forum is now the main square of Sopron.

During the Migration Period, Scarbantia was believed to be deserted. When Hungarians arrived in the area, the city was in ruins. From the 9th to the 11th centuries, Hungarians strengthened the old Roman city walls and built a castle. The city was named in Hungarian after a castle steward named Suprun.

Sopron County arose as one of the first counties of the Kingdom of Hungary. The county was established in the 11th century by King Stephen I of Hungary during the foundation of the Hungarian kingdom and the organization of the royal county system, with its administrative centre at Sopronvár (present-day Sopron), on the lands of the Osl clan.

In 1153, it was mentioned as an important city.

In 1273, King Otakar II of Bohemia occupied the castle. Even though he took the children of Sopron's nobility with him as hostages, the city opened its gates when the armies of King Ladislaus IV of Hungary arrived. Ladislaus rewarded Sopron by elevating it to the rank of free royal town.

=== 16th-19th centuries ===
During the Ottoman occupation of Hungary, the Ottoman Turks ravaged the city in 1529, but did not occupy it. Many Hungarians fled from the occupied areas to Sopron, and the city's importance grew.

While the Ottomans occupied most of Central Europe, the region north of Lake Balaton remained in the Kingdom of Hungary (captaincy between Balaton and Drava).

In 1676, Sopron was destroyed by a fire. The modern city was born over the next few decades, when Baroque buildings were built to replace the destroyed medieval ones. Sopron became the seat of the comitatus Sopron.

The town was the seat of the Ödenburg comitat near 1850. After the compromise of 1867 and until 1918, the city (known with the dual bilingual name of Sopron - Ödenburg) was part of the Habsburg-ruled Kingdom of Hungary.

=== 20th century to present ===
Sopron plebiscite, French and Italian officers arrive to control the voting districts on 14 December 1921.

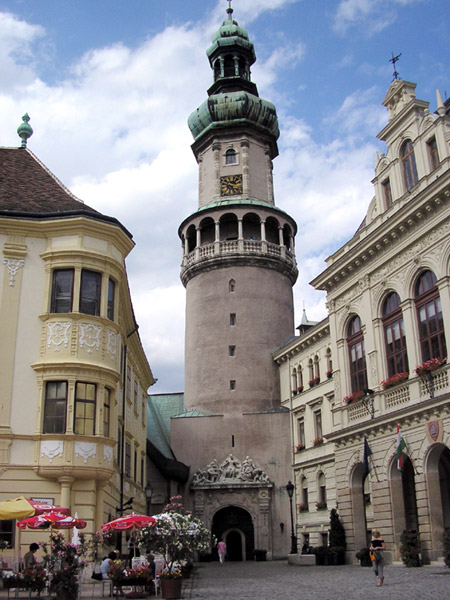
A fire tower built in the 12th century.

Following the breakup of the Austro-Hungarian Empire, ethnic Germans inhabited parts of four western Hungarian counties: Pozsony (Pressburg in German; Bratislava in Slovak/Czech), Vas (Eisenburg), Sopron (Ödenburg) and Moson (Wieselburg). The German-inhabited parts of those counties were initially awarded to Austria in the Treaty of Saint-Germain-en-Laye (1919). After local unrest and Italian diplomatic mediation in the Venice Protocol, Sopron's status as part of Hungary (along with that of the surrounding eight villages) was decided by a controversial, local plebiscite held on 14 December 1921, with 65% voting for Hungary. Since then Sopron has been called Civitas Fidelissima ("The Most Loyal City", Hungarian: A Leghűségesebb Város), and the anniversary of the plebiscite is a city holiday. However, the western parts of Vas, Sopron and Moson counties joined Austria and now form the Austrian federal state of Burgenland, and Pressburg/Pozsony was awarded to Czechoslovakia.

Sopron suffered greatly during World War II and was bombed several times. The Soviet Red Army captured the city on 1 April 1945.

The city of Sopron and the village of Sopronbánfalva began to stretch towards each other at the beginning of the 20th century, they unified in 1950 and since the areas have merged. Sopron and the village of Balf unified in 1985.

On 19 August 1989 Sopron was the site of the Pan-European Picnic, a protest on the border between Austria and Hungary, which was used by over 600 citizens of East Germany to escape to the West. As the first successful crossing of the border, it helped pave the way for the mass flight of East German citizens that led to the fall of the Berlin Wall on 9 November 1989.

During the Socialist era, the government tried to turn Sopron into an industrial city, but much of the medieval town center remains, allowing the city to remain an attractive site for tourists.

Today, Sopron's economy immensely benefits from the European Union. Having been a city close to nowhere, that is, to the Iron Curtain, Sopron now has re-established full trade relations to nearby Austria. Furthermore, after being suppressed during the Cold War, Sopron's German-speaking culture and heritage are now recognized again. As a consequence, many of the city's street-and traffic-signs are written in both Hungarian and German making it an officially bilingual city due to its proximity to the Austrian frontier. Visitors admire the large number of buildings in this city that reflect medieval architecture—rare in war-torn Hungary. Situated close to the Austrian border, Sopron receives many visitors from Vienna (70 kilometres (43 miles) away), and from Bratislava, Slovakia (77 km (48 mi) away), as well as from the United States, Great Britain, The Netherlands, Japan, and Scandinavia, who visit to take advantage of the excellent low-cost dental services offered: Sopron boasts so many dental clinics—more than 300—that the city is known as the "dental capital of the world."

== Wine production ==
Sopron is a significant wine producing region, one of the few in Hungary to make both red and white wines. Grapes include Kékfrankos for red wine and Traminer (Gewürztraminer) for white wine. In climate it is similar to the neighbouring Burgenland wine region in Austria, and several winemakers make wine in both countries. Blue Frankish (= Kékfrankos, Blaufränkisch), Traminer, and Green Veltliner (= Zöld Veltelini, Grüner Veltliner) are well-known Sopron wines. Sopron's Blue Frankish and Pinot Noir wines are particularly prized.

The group of ethnic German wine growers in the Sopron area in the Habsburg Monarchy were the so-called Ponzichter.

== Demographics ==
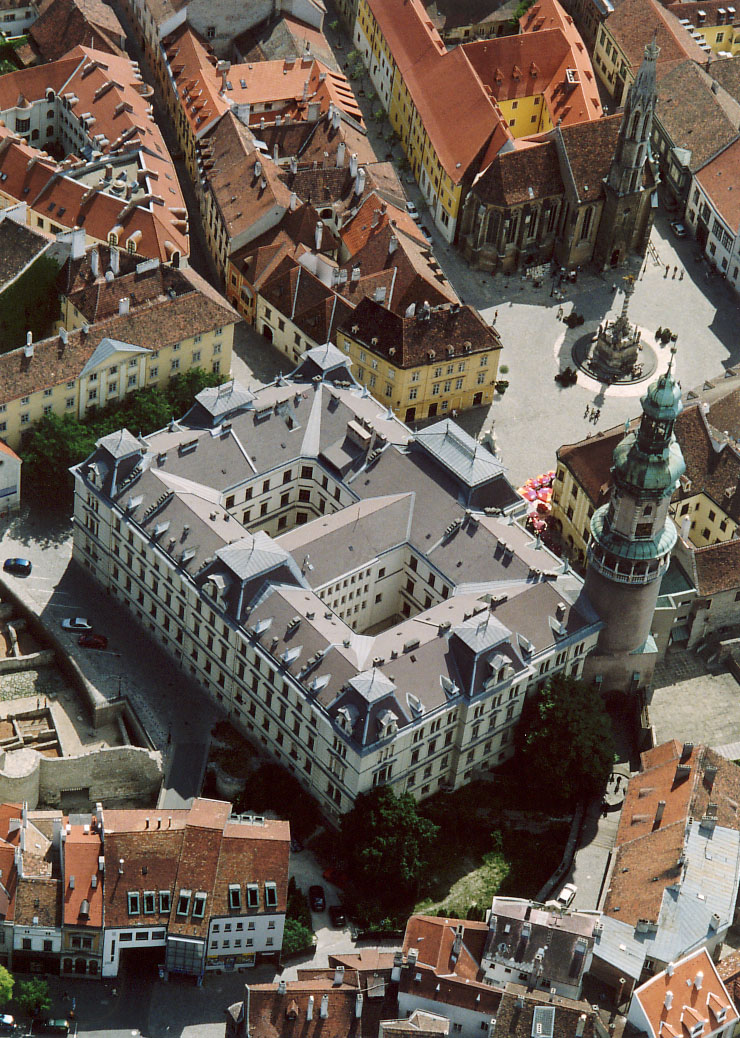
The Main Square, Town Hall and the Firewatch Tower

Historical population
Year	Pop.	±%
1870	23,102	—
1880	25,513	+10.4%
1890	29,788	+16.8%
1900	35,703	+19.9%
1910	36,721	+2.9%
1920	38,243	+4.1%
1930	39,436	+3.1%
1941	46,120	+16.9%
1949	35,617	−22.8%
1960	41,110	+15.4%
1970	47,111	+14.6%
1980	53,945	+14.5%
1990	55,083	+2.1%
2001	56,175	+2.0%
2011	60,548	+7.8%
2022	60,090	−0.8%

In 1910, Sopron had 33,931 inhabitants (51% German, 44.3% Hungarian, 4.7% other). Religions: 64.1% Catholic, 27.8% Lutheran, 6.6% Jewish, 1.2% Calvinist, 0.3% other. In 2001, the city had 56,125 inhabitants (92.8% Hungarian, 3.5% German, 3.7% other). Religions: 69% Catholic, 7% Lutheran, 3% Calvinist, 8.1% Atheist, 11.9% no answer, 1% other.

== Architecture ==
The architecture of the old section of town reflects its long history; walls and foundations from the Roman Empire are still common, together with a wealth of Medieval, Renaissance, and Baroque structures, often artistically decorated, showing centuries of stability and prosperity.

There is an old synagogue and other remains from the town's former Jewish community, which was expelled in the 16th century.

On Daloshegy, there is a 165-metre-tall FM-/TV-broadcasting tower, nicknamed "Rakéta" (Hungarian for rocket).

== Places of interest ==
- City centre
- Firewatch Tower
- Walls with Roman origin
- Széchenyi Square and Flag of Loyalty
- Kecske Church
- Esterházy Palace (baroque)
- Eggenberg House
- City Hall (eclectic, 1895)
- Storno House (renaissance)
- Fabricius House
- "Two Moors" House (18th century baroque)
- Chemist's Museum (15th–16th century. The house was pronounced the first national monument in Hungary by Louis II of Hungary in 1525.)
- Lábasház (16th–17th century)
- Gambrinus House (Old city hall)
- Taródi Castle (István Taródi built the castle by himself. He started the building operations in 1945, when he was 20.)

== Amusement ==
- Cartoon Forum (From Tuesday 14 to Friday 17 September 2010)
- Spring Festival of Sopron (Soproni Tavaszi Fesztivál)
- Festal Weeks of Sopron (Soproni Ünnepi Hetek)
- Civitas Pinceszínház (Civitas Basement Theater)
- Liszt Ferenc Művelődési Központ (Franz Liszt Conference and Cultural Centre )

== Politics ==
The current mayor of Sopron is Ciprián Farkas (Fidesz-KDNP).

The local Municipal Assembly, elected at the 2024 local government elections, is made up of 18 members (1 Mayor, 12 Individual constituency representatives and 5 Compensation List representatives) divided into this political parties and alliances:

Party		Seats	Current Municipal Assembly
	Fidesz-KDNP	13	M
	Momentum movement	2	
	Dialogue-DK	1	
	Hungarian Two-Tailed Dog Party	1	
Our homeland movement	1		

== Gallery ==
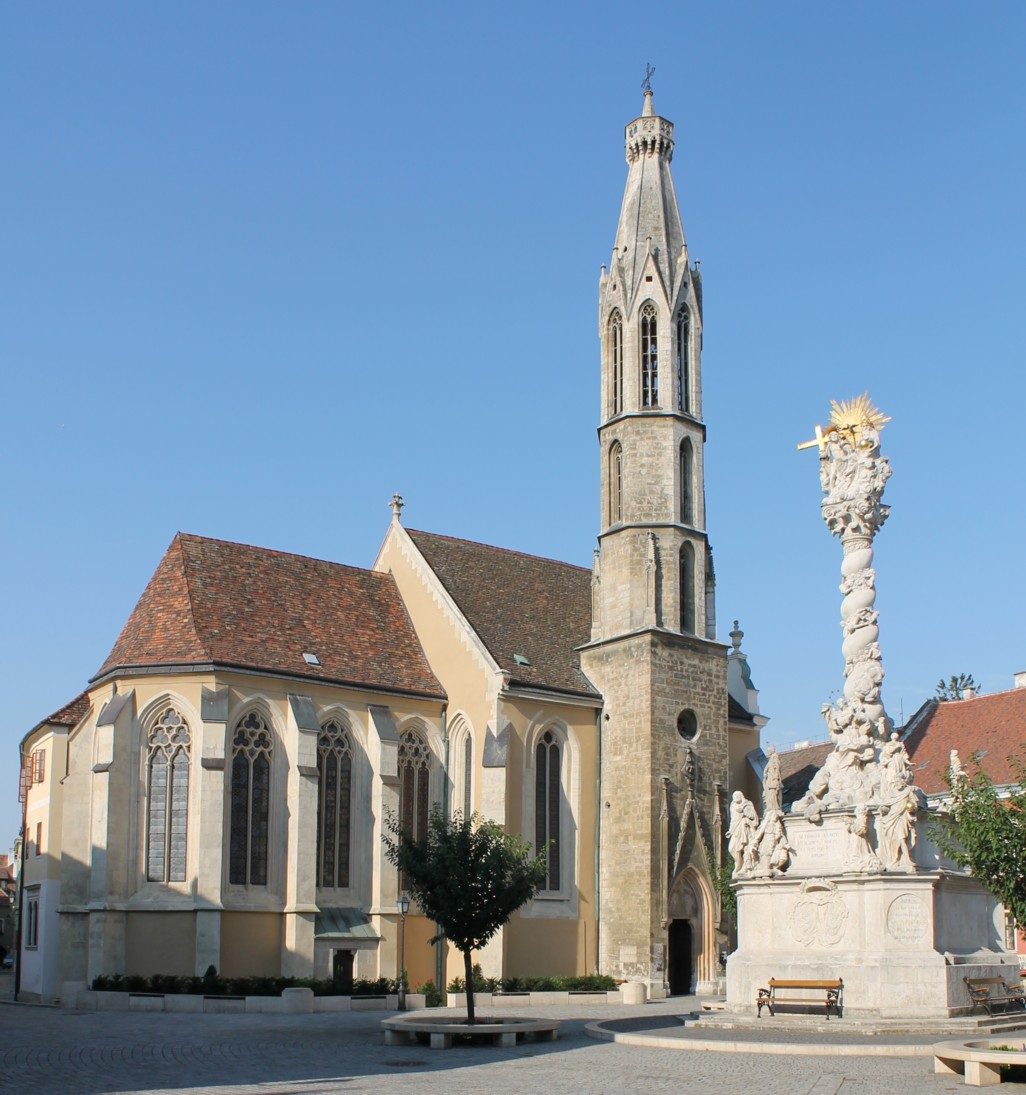
Goat Church and Holy Trinity Column

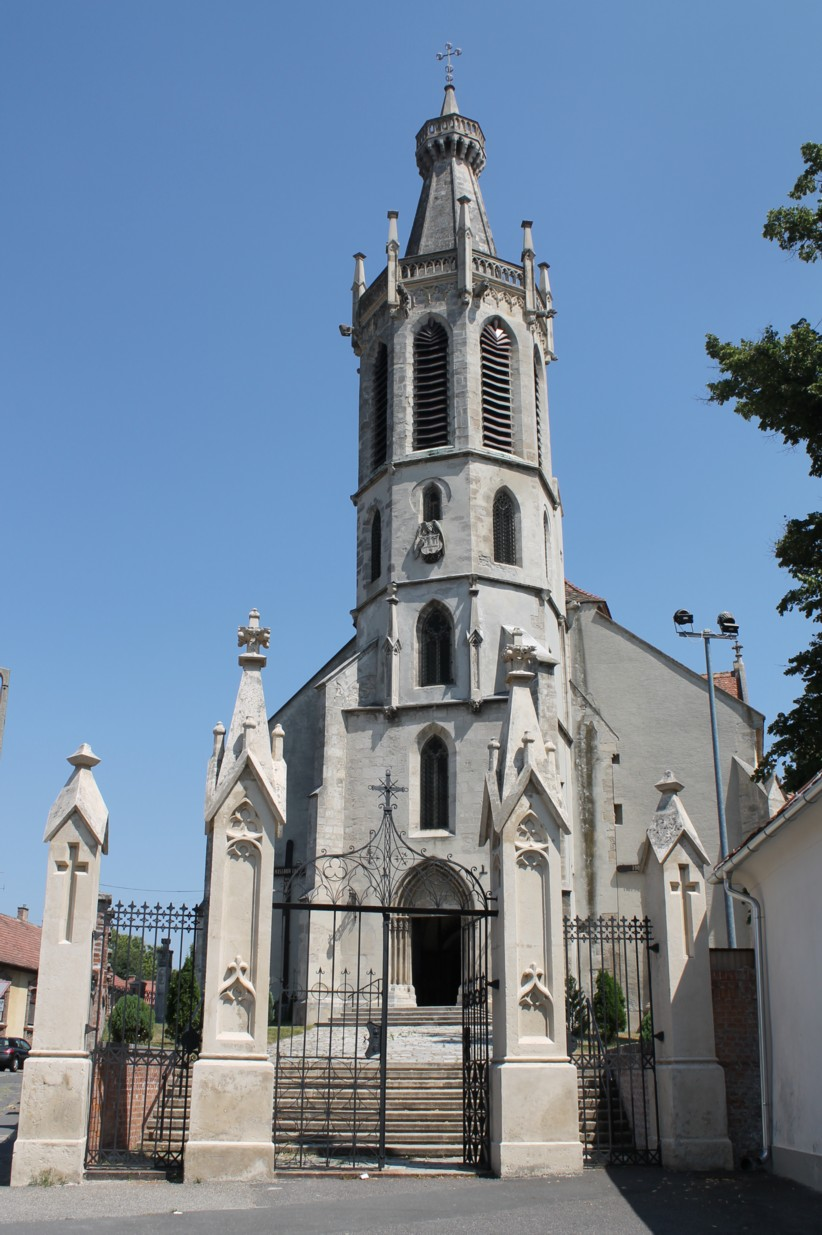
Saint Michael's Church

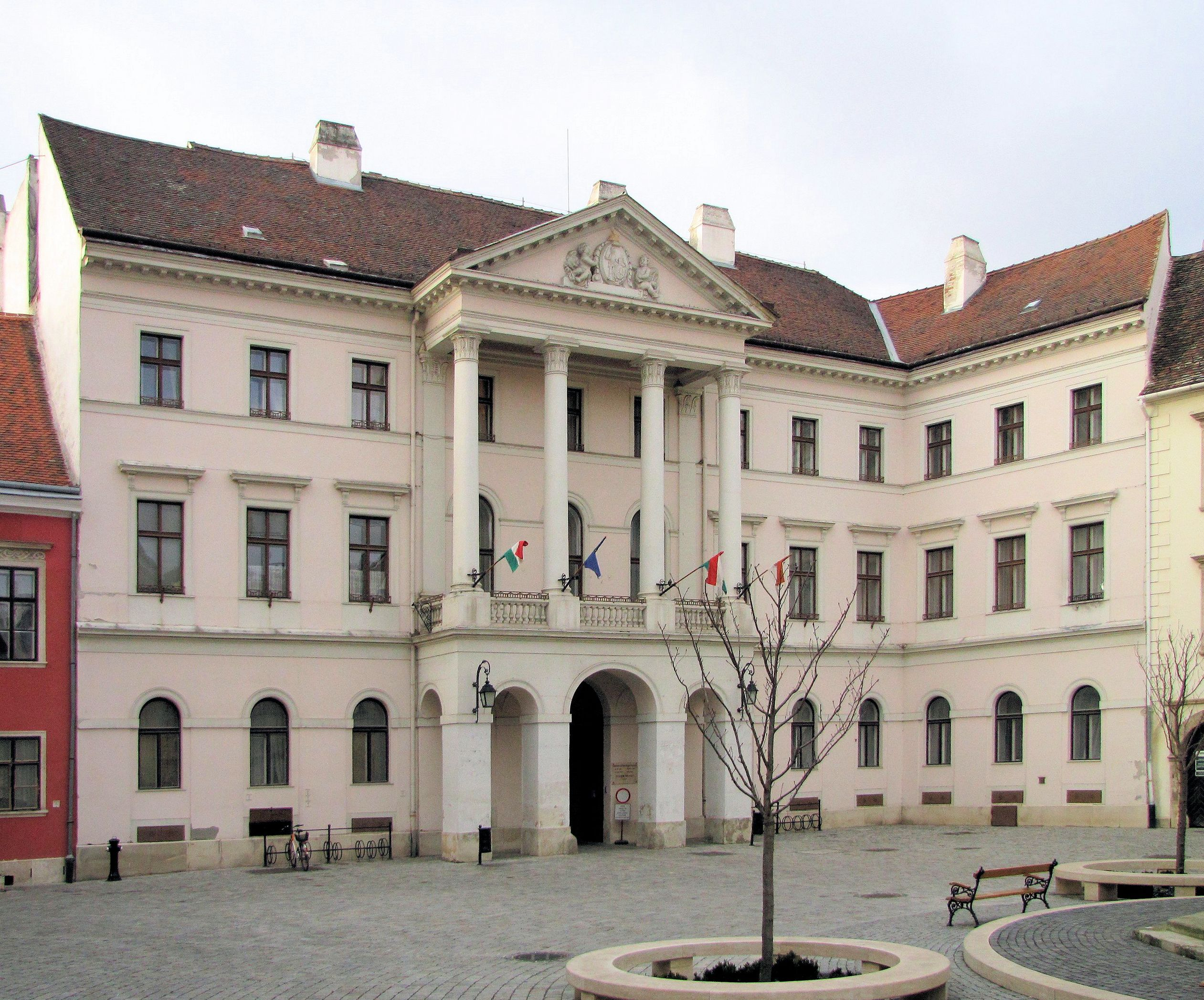
County Hall of Győr-Moson-Sopron County

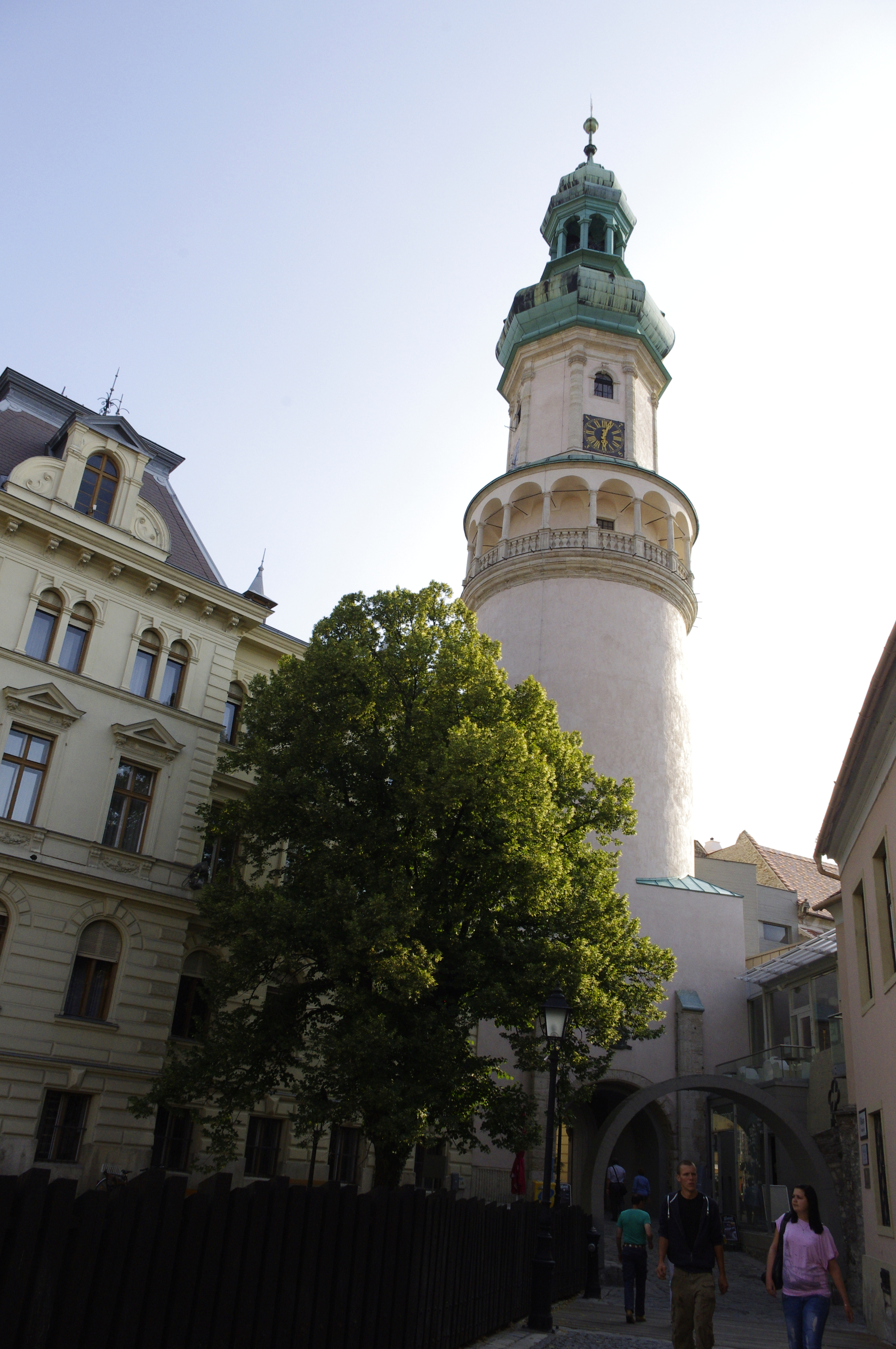
Fire Tower

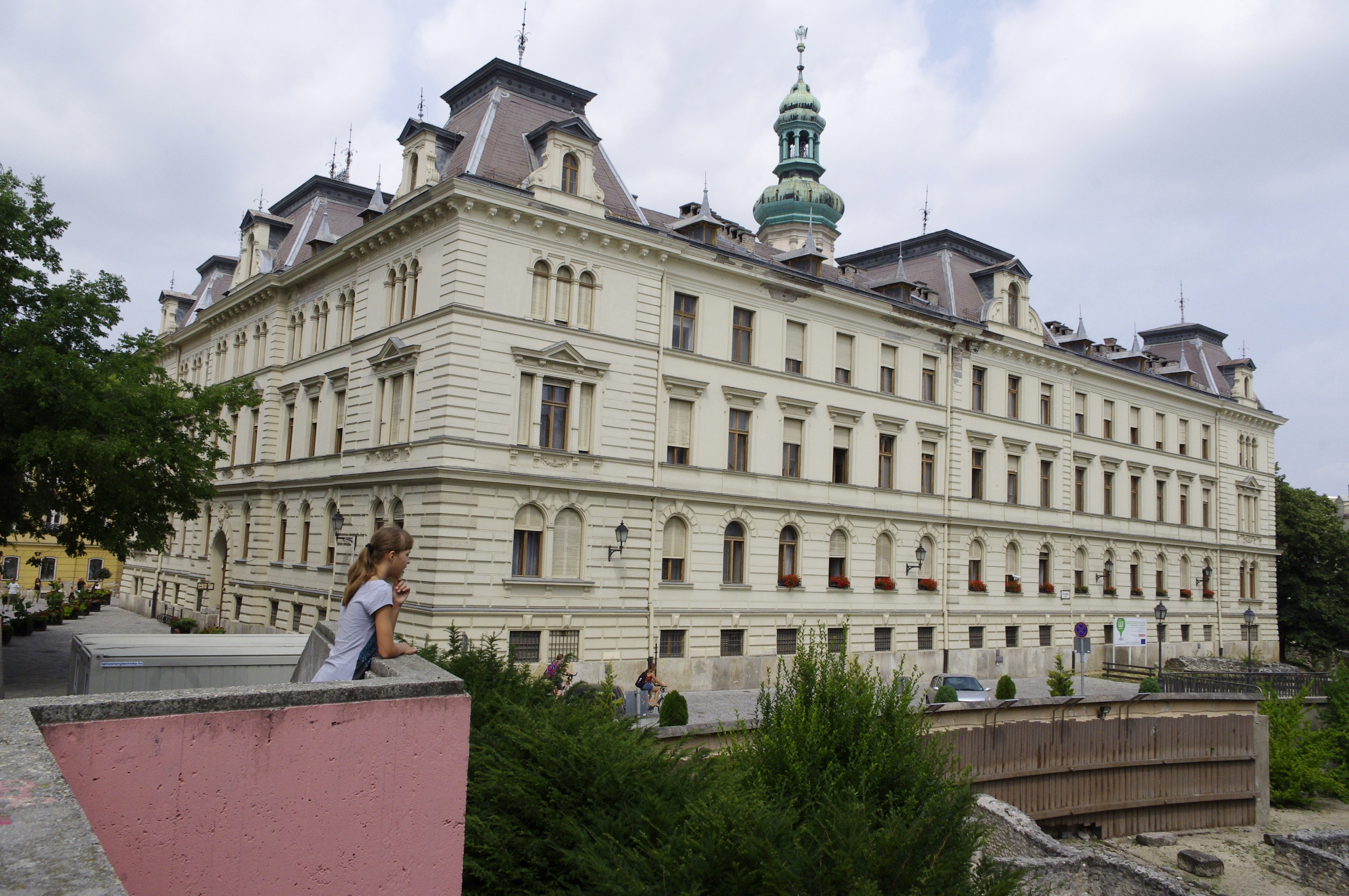
Town Hall

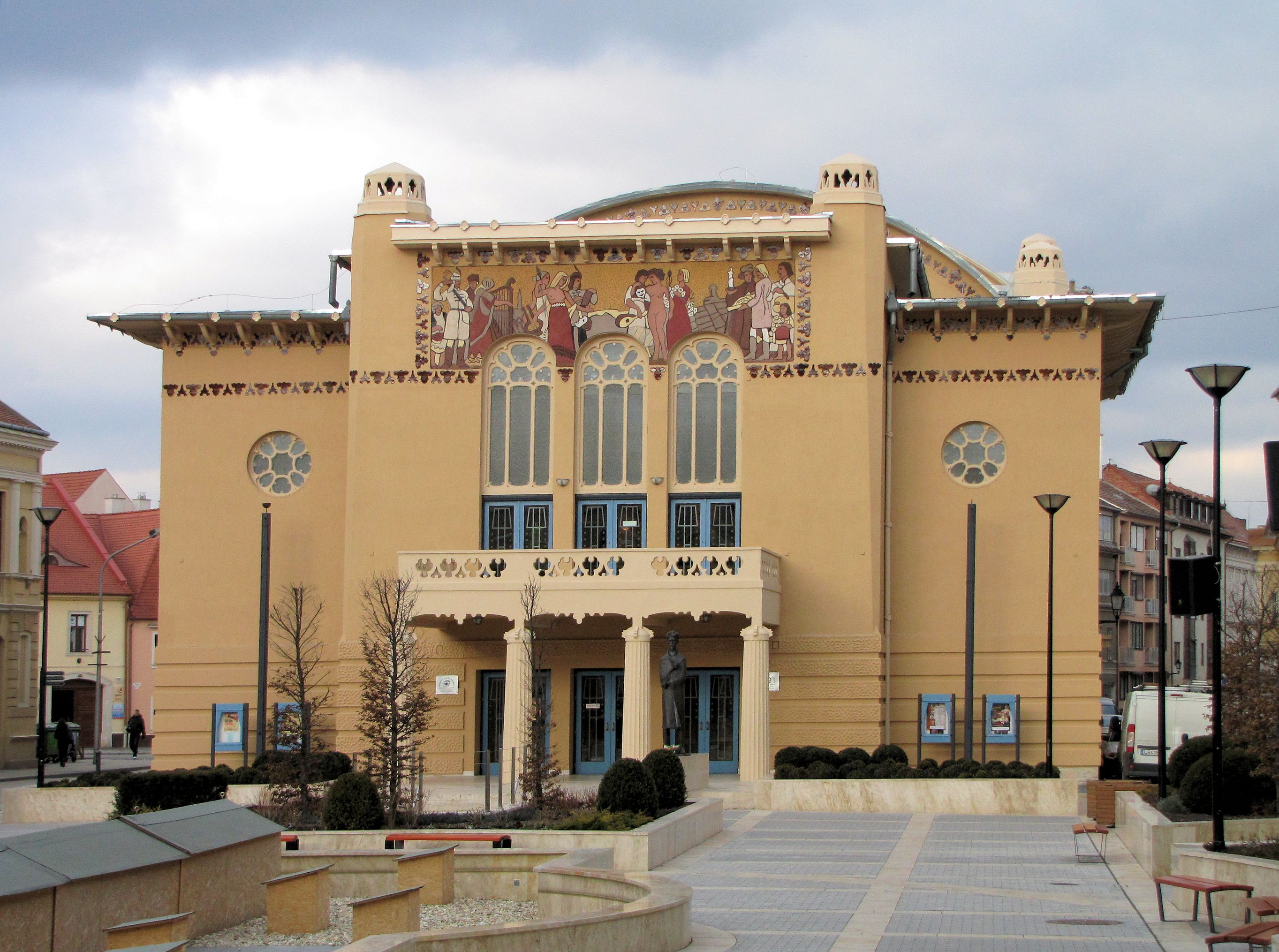
Petőfi Theater

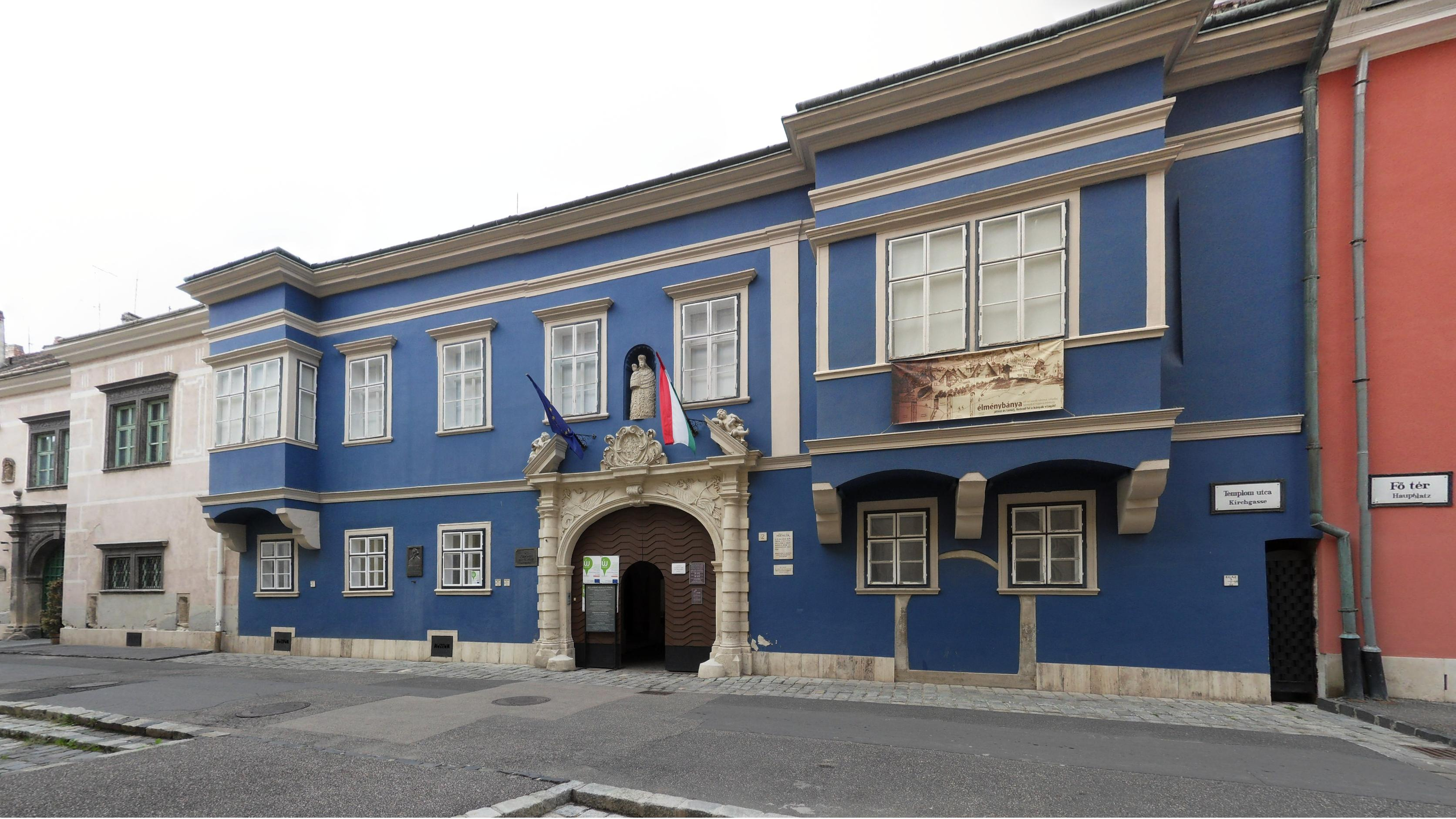
Esterházy Palace in the Temple Street

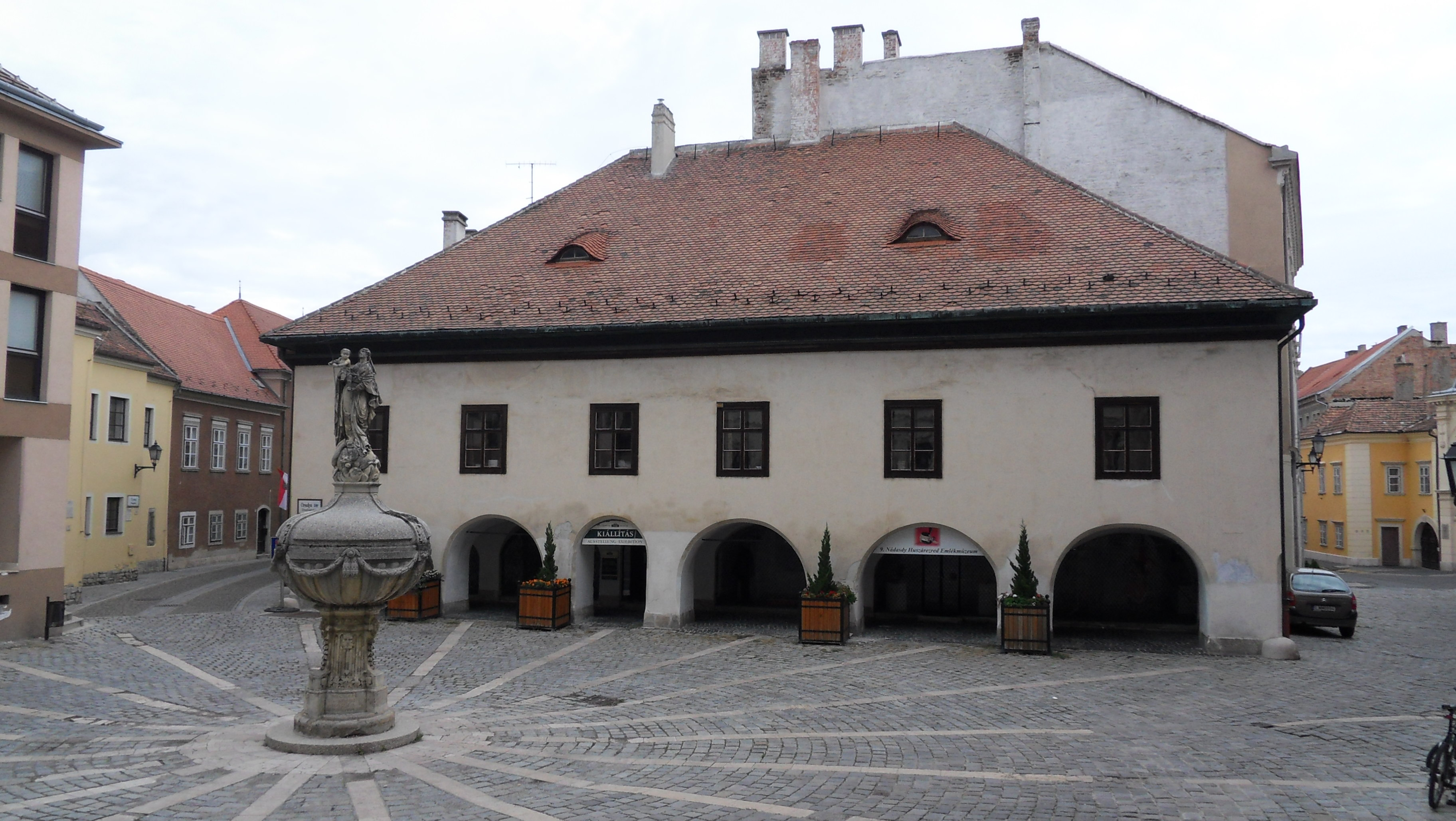
Orsolya Square and the Mary Fountain

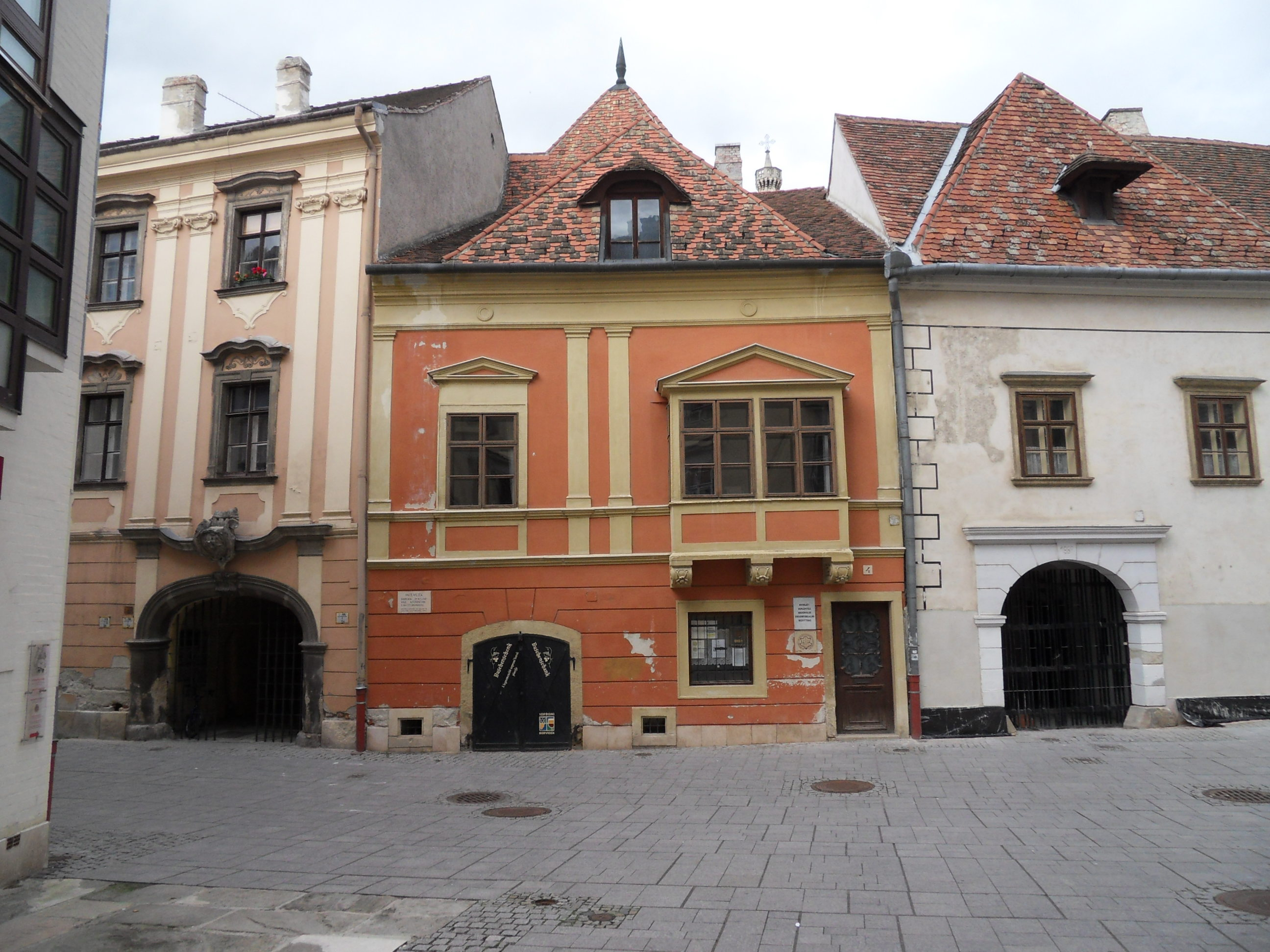
New Street

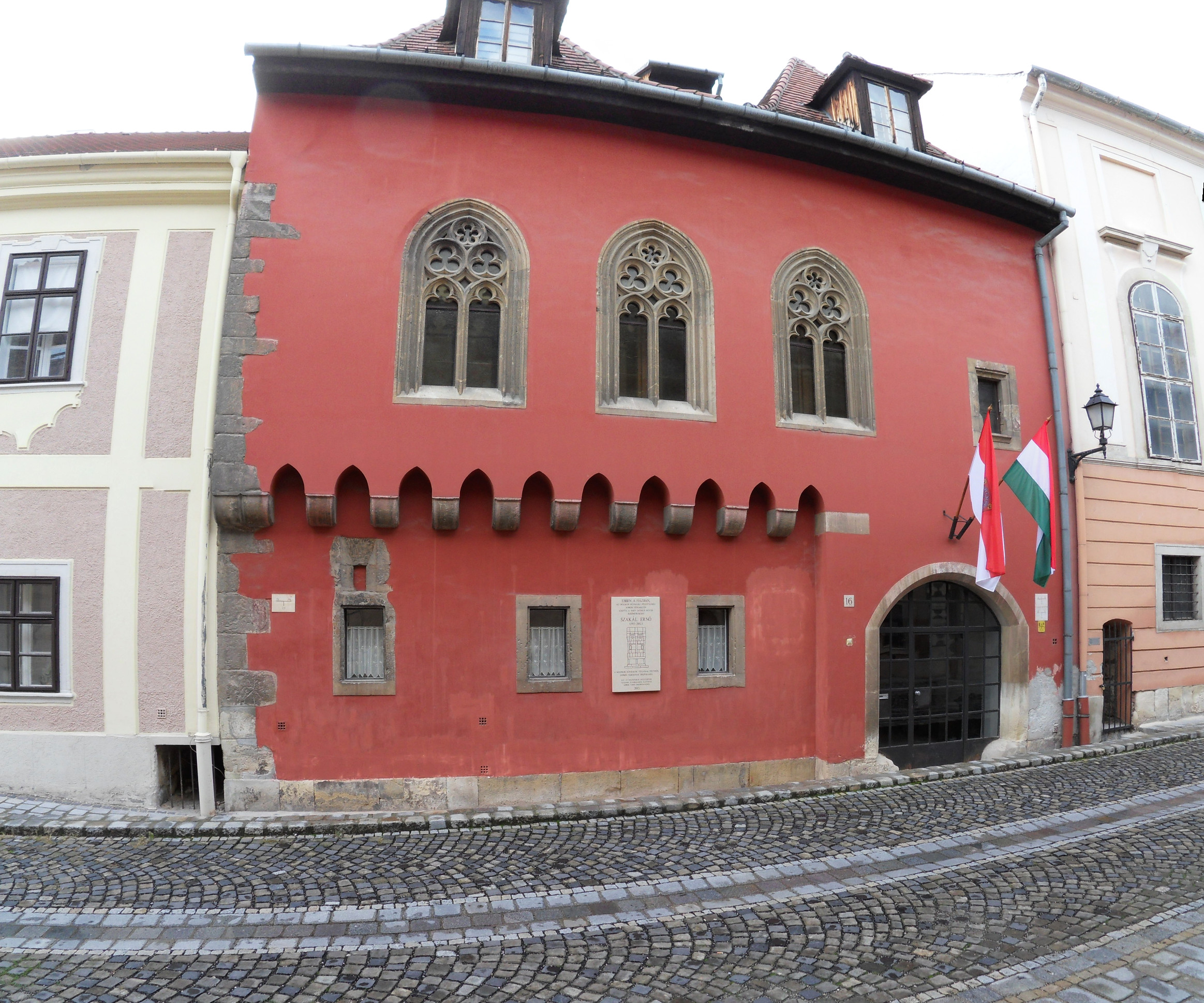
Gothic house in the New Street

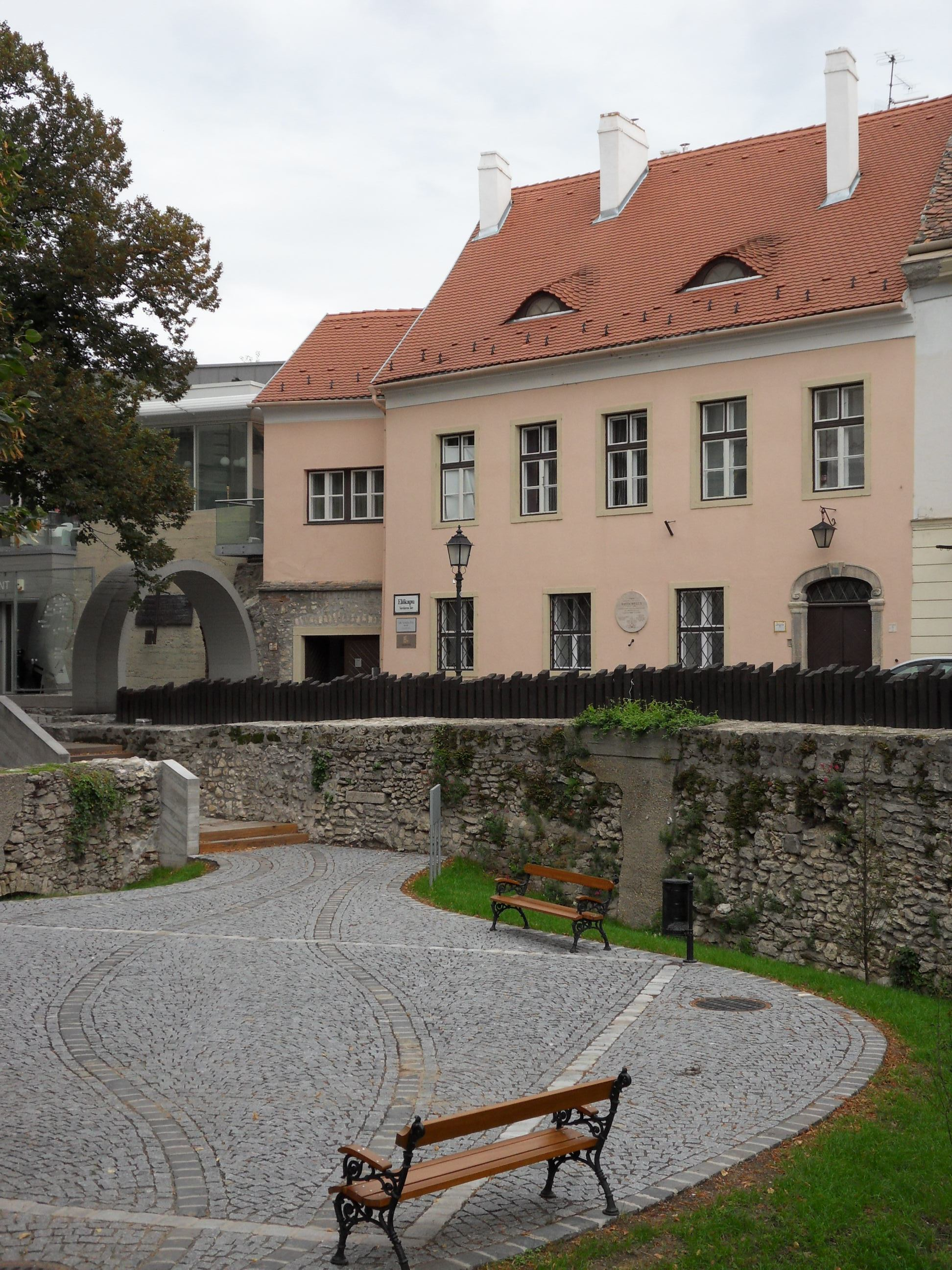
Előkapu Square

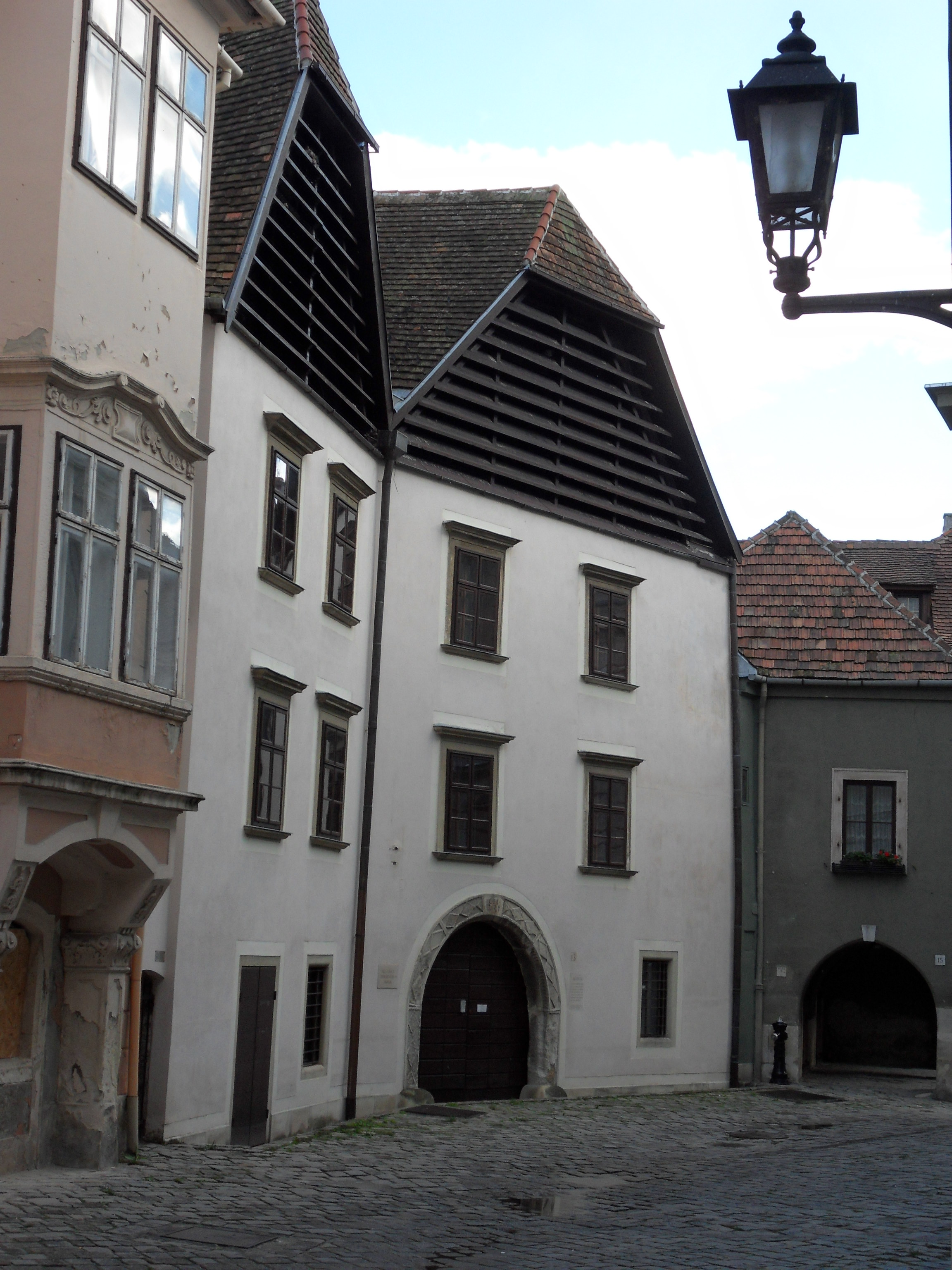
House, Kolostor Street 13.

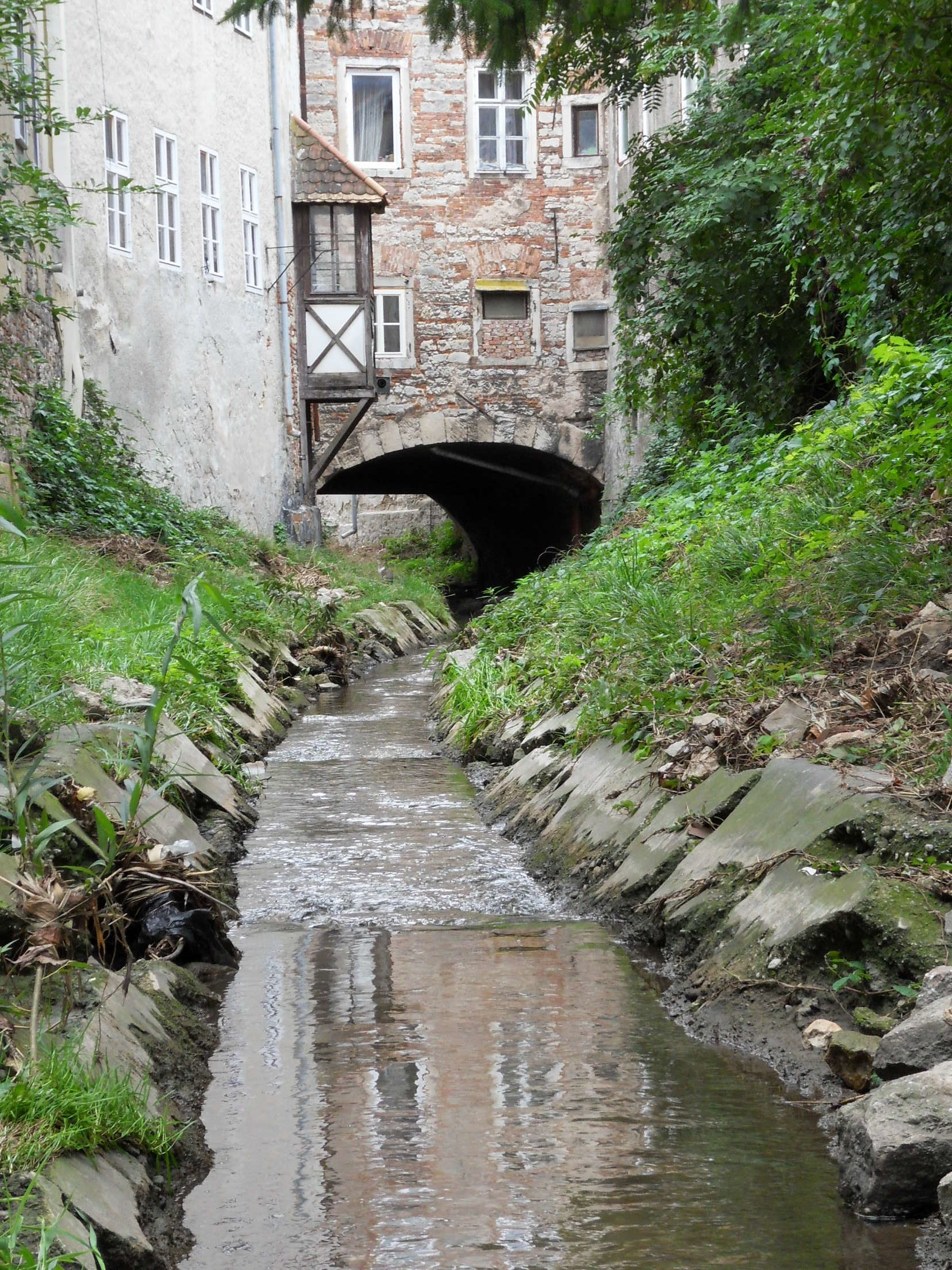
Ikva Bridge

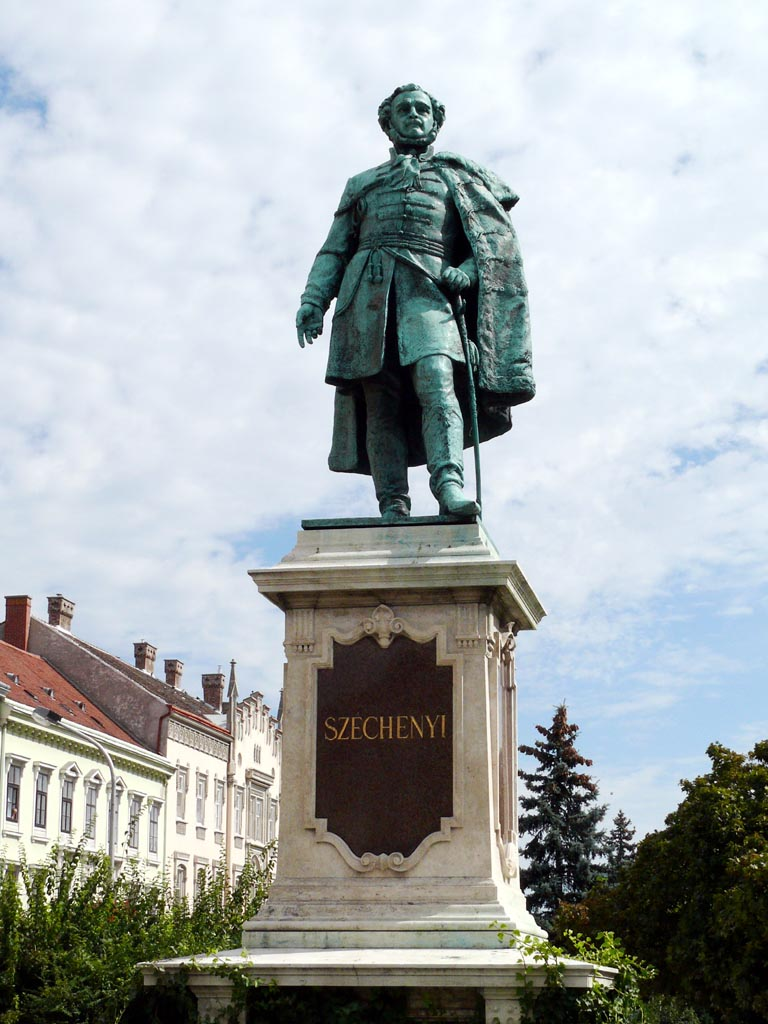
Statue of István Széchenyi

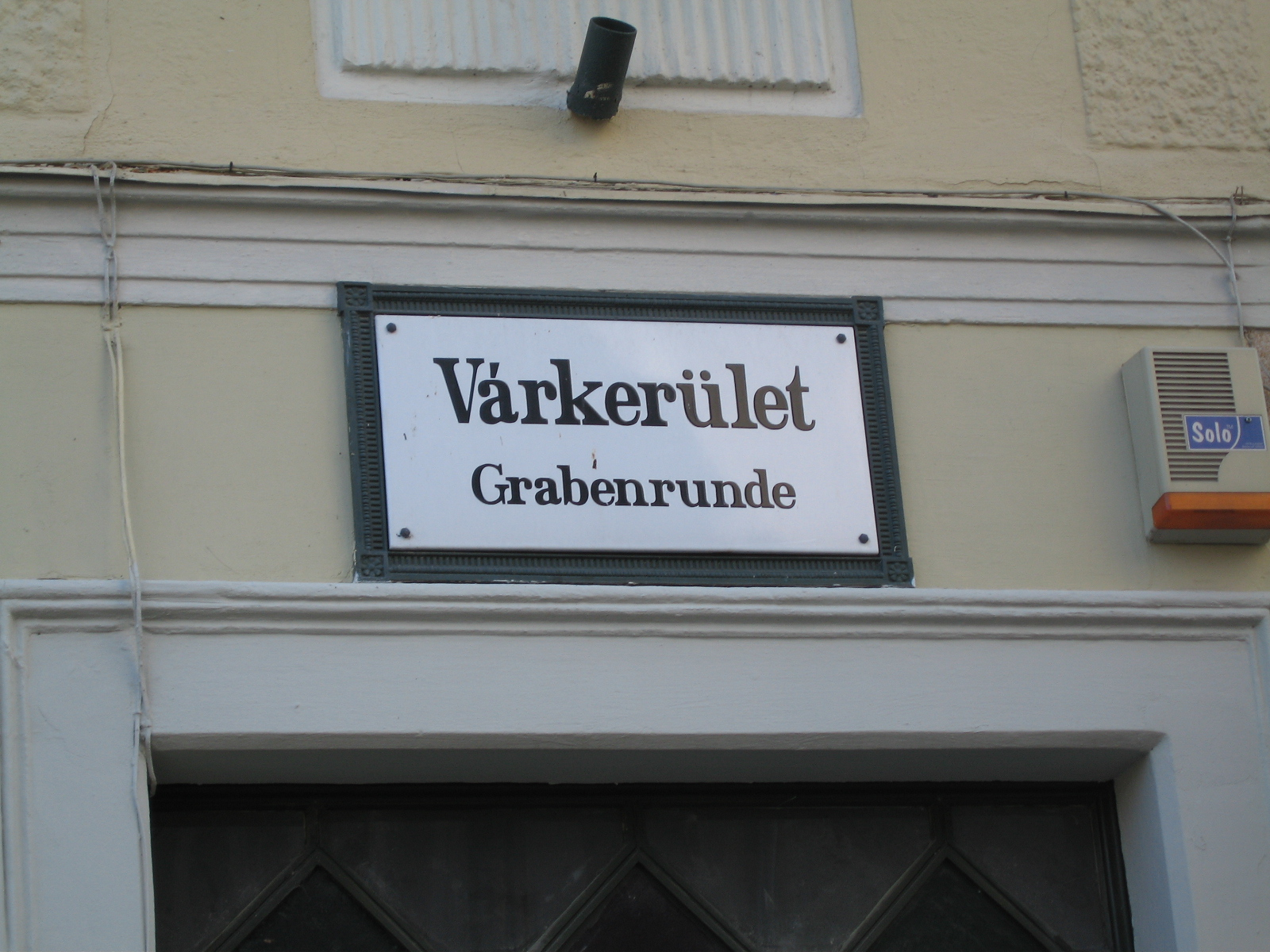
Bilingual (Hungarian/German) road signs in Sopron.

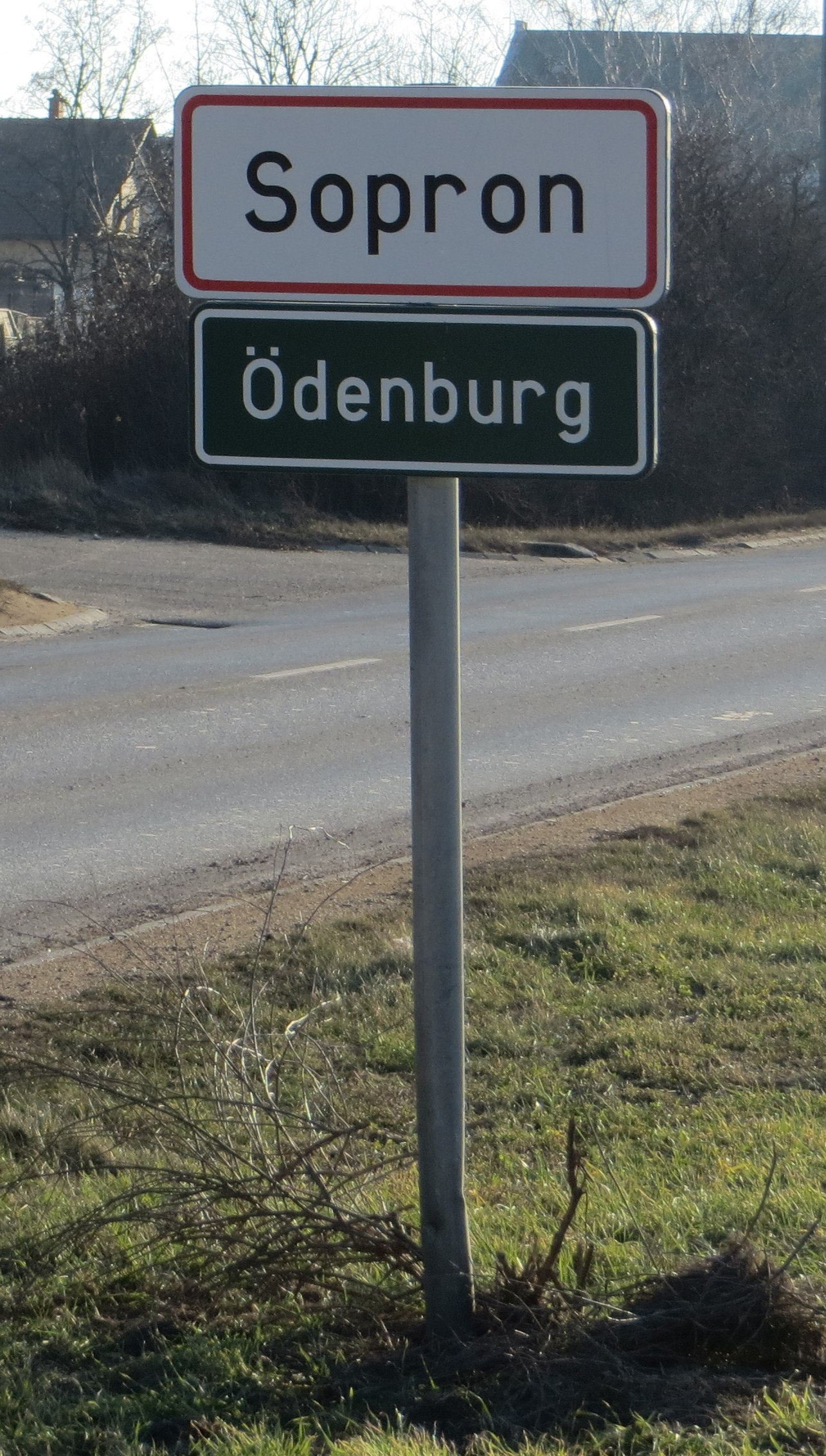
Bilingual sign

== Sports ==
The women's basketball team Sopron Basket is one of the most successful Hungarian basketball team in history, with 15 National titles and success in Europe, in 2022 they won EuroLeague. MFC Sopron was a football team based in Sopron. The successor of the club is Soproni VSE.

== Transport ==
Sopron's nearest airport is Vienna Airport, located 74 km (46 mi) north of the city.

== Notable residents ==
- Rogerius of Apulia (1205-1266), medieval chronicler
- Anna Maria von Eggenberg, née Brandenburg-Bayreuth (1609-1680), Margravine of Brandenburg-Bayreuth and Princess of Eggenberg
- Dániel Berzsenyi (1776-1836), poet
- Ludwig von Benedek (1804-1881), Austrian general
- Franz Liszt (1811-1886), composer
- Franz von Suppé (1819-1895), composer
- Julius Lenck (1845 - 1901), Hungarian-German brewer, wholesaler and the founder of the Sopron Brewery (Soproni Sörgyár).
- Gyula Fényi (1845-1927), astronomer
- László Rátz (1863-1930), mathematics teacher
- Kálmán Kánya (1869-1945), politician, diplomat, Foreign Minister
- Franz Lehár (1870-1948), composer
- Béla Bartók (1881-1945), composer
- Charles I of Austria (1887-1922), last king of Hungary
- Georg Trakl (1887-1914), poet
- Mátyás Rákosi (1892-1971), politician, communist leader
- David-Zvi Pinkas (1895-1952), signatory of the Israeli declaration of independence
- Margaret Mahler (1897-1985), psychoanalyst
- Sandor Gallus (1907-1996), archaeologist
- Géza Ankerl (born 1933), Professor of MIT (Massachusetts Institute of Technology), sociologist
- Alexander Gallus (born 1940), medical researcher
- József Szájer (born 1961), politician
- István Hiller (born 1964), politician, Minister of Culture
- Mihály Tóth (born 1974), football player
- Vilmos Radasics (born 1983), BMX rider
- Tímea Babos (born 1993), tennis player
- Botond Balogh (born 2002), football player
- Balogh de Mankó Bük, Hungarian nobility
- József Rokop, freedom fighter
- Terezia Mora, writer

== Twin towns – sister cities ==
Sopron is twinned with:

- Bad Wimpfen, Germany
- Banská Štiavnica, Slovakia
- Bolzano, Italy
- Eilat, Israel
- Eisenstadt, Austria
- Kazuno, Japan
- Kempten, Germany
- Mediaș, Romania
- Rorschach, Switzerland
- Seinäjoki, Finland
- Sparta, Greece

== See also ==
- Daughters of the Divine Redeemer
- Jewish history of Sopron
- Lake Neusiedl
