= Adolf Dux =

Hungarian writer (1822–1881)

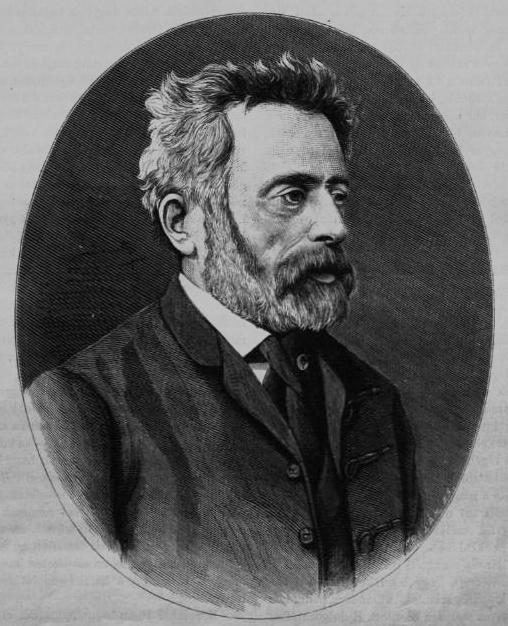
Adolf Dux (undated)

Adolf Dux (Hungarian: Dux Adolf; 25 October 1822, Pozsony – 20 November 1881, Budapest) was a Hungarian Jewish writer and journalist.

A cousin of Leopold Dukes, Dux studied law and philosophy at the University of Vienna, and was connected with the Pressburger Zeitung until 1855, when he became a correspondent for Pester Lloyd. He translated Sándor Petőfi's and Josef Eötvös' Hungarian poetry, and Katona's tragedy, Bank Ban. He wrote Aus Ungarn as well as various stories in German under the title Deutsch-Ungarisches.
